= The Man in Black 1954–1958 =

Box set by Johnny Cash
- Released: 1990
- Recorded: 1954–1958
- Genres: Rockabilly; country
- Length: Seven hours
- Label: Bear Family

Johnny Cash chronology
Highwayman 2 (1990)	The Man in Black 1954–1958 (1990)	Come Along and Ride this Train (1991)

Professional ratings
Review scores
Source	Rating
Allmusic	link

The Man in Black 1954–1958 is a Bear Family Records 5-CD box set of Johnny Cash's music. It contains every known recording from Sun to Columbia from the years 1954–1958. It's the first of three box sets in the Man In Black box set series.

The box itself is shaped as a square border box as it holds cases for the discs, and a booklet for a welcome bonus.

== Track listing ==
Disc One
No.	Title	Original Album	Length
1.	"Wide Open Road"	The Sun Years	1:50
2.	"You're My Baby"	The Sun Years	1:48
3.	"My Treasure"	The Sun Years	2:31
4.	"My Treasure"	Now Here's Johnny Cash	1:17
5.	"Hey Porter"	Previously unreleased	2:13
6.	"Folsom Prison Blues"	Previously unreleased	2:32
7.	"Wide Open Road"	The Sun Years	2:36
8.	"My Two Timin' Woman"	The Roots of Rock, Vol. 10: Sun Country	1:59
9.	"Hey Porter"	Now Here's Johnny Cash	2:15
10.	"Cry! Cry! Cry!"	With His Hot and Blue Guitar	2:29
11.	"Wide Open Road"	Story Songs of the Trains and Rivers	2:30
12.	"Port of Lonely Hearts"	Now Here's Johnny Cash	2:36
13.	"I Couldn't Keep from Crying"	The Singing Storyteller	2:03
14.	"New Mexico"	The Sun Years	2:07
15.	"Folsom Prison Blues"	With His Hot and Blue Guitar	2:50
16.	"So Doggone Lonesome"	With His Hot and Blue Guitar	2:39
17.	"Mean Eyed Cat"	Sings Hank Williams	2:30
18.	"Luther Played the Boogie"	Greatest!	2:05
19.	"Rock and Roll Ruby"	The Sun Years	1:44
20.	"I Walk the Line"	The Sun Years	2:41
21.	"Brakeman's Blues" (Incomplete)	Previously unreleased	1:32
22.	"Get Rhythm"	Previously unreleased	2:16
23.	"Get Rhythm"	Greatest!	2:15
24.	"I Walk the Line"	With His Hot and Blue Guitar	2:46
25.	"Train of Love"	Sun Records, The Country Years	2:38
26.	"Train of Love"	Sings the Songs That Made Him Famous	2:24
27.	"There You Go"	Sings the Songs That Made Him Famous	2:19
28.	"One More Ride" (Incomplete)	The Sun Years	00:50
29.	"I Love You Because"	The Sun Years	2:27
30.	"Goodbye Little Darlin'"	Greatest!	2:16
31.	"I Love You Because"	Sings Hank Williams	2:28
32.	"Straight A's In Love"	Sings Hank Williams	2:14

Disc Two
No.	Title	Original Album	Length
1.	"Don't Make Me Go"	Previously unreleased	2:53
2.	"Next In Line"	Sings the Songs That Made Him Famous	2:48
3.	"Don't Make Me Go"	The Sun Years	2:33
4.	"Don't Make Me Go"	Sings the Songs That Made Him Famous	2:30
5.	"Home of the Blues" (Undubbed Master)	Previously unreleased	3:01
6.	"Give My Love to Rose"	Previously unreleased	3:12
7.	"Give My Love to Rose"	Sings Hank Williams	2:46
8.	"Home of the Blues" (Overdubbed Master)	Sings the Songs That Made Him Famous	2:41
9.	"Rock Island Line"	With His Hot and Blue Guitar	2:01
10.	"Wreck of the Old 97"	With His Hot and Blue Guitar	1:48
11.	"Belshazzar"	The Original Sun Sound of Johnny Cash	2:27
12.	"Country Boy"	The Sun Years	1:49
13.	"Leave That Junk Alone"	The Sun Years	1:30
14.	"Doin' My Time"	With His Hot and Blue Guitar	2:39
15.	"Country Boy"	With His Hot and Blue Guitar	1:53
16.	"If the Good Lord's Willing"	With His Hot and Blue Guitar	1:44
17.	"I Heard That Lonesome Whistle Blow"	With His Hot and Blue Guitar	2:25
18.	"I Was There When It Happened"	Sun Records, The Country Years	2:18
19.	"Remember Me (I'm the One Who Loves You)"	With His Hot and Blue Guitar	2:49
20.	"I Was There When It Happened"	With His Hot and Blue Guitar	2:17
21.	"Big River"	Previously unreleased	3:46
22.	"Ballad of a Teenage Queen"	Previously unreleased	2:18
23.	"Goodnight Irene"	The Sun Years	2:41
24.	"Big River"	Sings the Songs That Made Him Famous	2:33
25.	"Ballad of a Teenage Queen"	Sings the Songs That Made Him Famous	2:14
26.	"Come In Stranger"	The Roots Of Rock, Vol. 4: Cotton City Country	2:03
27.	"Guess Things Happen That Way" (Undubbed Master)	Previously unreleased	1:58
28.	"Come In Stranger"	Sings Hank Williams	1:43
29.	"Oh, Lonesome Me" (Undubbed Master)	Previously unreleased	2:30
30.	"Guess Things Happen That Way"	Sings the Songs That Made Him Famous	1:52
31.	"Oh, Lonesome Me" (Overdubbed Master)	Now Here's Johnny Cash	2:29

Disc Three
No.	Title	Original Album	Length
1.	"Sugartime"	Previously unreleased	1:46
2.	"Born To Lose" (Undubbed Master)	The Sun Years	2:10
3.	"You're the Nearest Thing to Heaven"	Sings the Songs That Made Him Famous	2:41
4.	"Born to Lose"	The Original Sun Sound of Johnny Cash	2:11
5.	"Sugartime" (Overdubbed Master)	Now Here's Johnny Cash	1:50
6.	"Story of a Broken Heart"	The Sun Years	2:33
7.	"Always Alone" (Incomplete)	The Sun Years	1:35
8.	"Always Alone"	The Original Sun Sound of Johnny Cash	1:52
9.	"Story of a Broken Heart" (False Starts)	Previously unreleased	2:28
10.	"Story of a Broken Heart"	Now Here's Johnny Cash	2:12
11.	"You Tell Me"	Greatest!	1:55
12.	"Life Goes On"	Now Here's Johnny Cash	2:01
13.	"You Win Again"	Previously unreleased	2:18
14.	"I Could Never Be Ashamed of You"	Previously unreleased	2:14
15.	"Hey Good Lookin'"	Previously unreleased	1:43
16.	"I Can't Help It"	Previously unreleased	1:46
17.	"Cold Cold Heart"	Previously unreleased	2:21
18.	"Blue Train"	All Aboard the Blue Train	2:03
19.	"Katy Too"	Greatest!	1:58
20.	"The Ways of a Woman in Love"	The Sun Years	2:28
21.	"Fools Hall of Fame"	Previously unreleased	2:25
22.	"The Ways of a Woman in Love"	Sings the Songs That Made Him Famous	2:17
23.	"Thanks a Lot"	Greatest!	2:38
24.	"It's Just About Time"	Previously unreleased	2:08
25.	"I Forgot to Remember to Forget"	Previously unreleased	2:10
26.	"I Just Thought You'd Like to Know"	Greatest!	2:25
27.	"It's Just About Time"	Greatest!	2:10
28.	"I Forgot to Remember to Forget"	Greatest!	1:55
29.	"Down The Street to 301"	Now Here's Johnny Cash	2:03

Disc Four
No.	Title	Original Album	Length
1.	"Oh What a Dream"	Previously unreleased	2:05
2.	"I'll Remember You"	Previously unreleased	2:07
3.	"Drink to Me"	Songs of Our Soil	1:54
4.	"What Do I Care"	"All Over Again" B-side	2:08
5.	"Suppertime"	The Fabulous Johnny Cash	2:51
6.	"It Was Jesus"	Hymns by Johnny Cash	2:05
7.	"Oh What a Dream"	Columbia Records 1958-1986	2:03
8.	"I'll Remember You"	Previously unreleased	2:05
9.	"Mama's Baby"	The Unissued Johnny Cash	2:22
10.	"The Troubadour"	The Fabulous Johnny Cash	2:16
11.	"Run Softly Blue River"	The Fabulous Johnny Cash	2:15
12.	"All Over Again"	Single A-side	2:15
13.	"That's All Over"	The Fabulous Johnny Cash	1:54
14.	"Frankie's Man Johnnie"	The Fabulous Johnny Cash	2:17
15.	"Fool's Hall of Fame"	The Unissued Johnny Cash	2:09
16.	"Walkin' the Blues"	The Unissued Johnny Cash	2:14
17.	"Lead Me Father"	Hymns by Johnny Cash	2:27
18.	"That's Enough"	The Fabulous Johnny Cash	2:42
19.	"I Still Miss Someone"	The Fabulous Johnny Cash	2:36
20.	"One More Ride"	The Fabulous Johnny Cash	2:02
21.	"Pickin' Time"	The Fabulous Johnny Cash	1:59
22.	"Don't Take Your Guns to Town"	The Fabulous Johnny Cash	3:04
23.	"I'd Rather Die Young"	The Fabulous Johnny Cash	2:31
24.	"The Shepherd of My Heart"	The Fabulous Johnny Cash	2:12
25.	"Cold Shoulder"	The Unissued Johnny Cash	1:52

Disc Five
No.	Title	Original Album	Length
1.	"Lead Me Father" (Takes 1-4)	Previously unreleased	3:41
2.	"Lead Me Father" (Takes 5-9)	Previously unreleased	4:32
3.	"Lead Me Father" (Takes 10-12)	Previously unreleased	3:47
4.	"Lead Me Father" (Master-Take 13)	Hymns by Johnny Cash	2:36
5.	"That's Enough" (Takes 1-3)	Previously unreleased	2:28
6.	"That's Enough" (Master-Take 4)	The Fabulous Johnny Cash	2:52
7.	"I Still Miss Someone" (Takes 1-5)	Previously unreleased	4:07
8.	"I Still Miss Someone" (Takes 6-8)	Previously unreleased	4:19
9.	"I Still Miss Someone" (Takes 9-10)	Previously unreleased	2:55
10.	"I Still Miss Someone" (Master-Take 11)	The Fabulous Johnny Cash	2:43
11.	"One More Ride" (Takes 1-4)	Previously unreleased	3:09
12.	"One More Ride" (Takes 5-11)	Previously unreleased	2:16
13.	"One More Ride" (Master-Take 12)	The Fabulous Johnny Cash	2:06
14.	"Pickin' Time" (Takes 1-2)	Previously unreleased	2:32
15.	"Pickin' Time" (Master-Take 3)	The Fabulous Johnny Cash	2:04
16.	"Don't Take Your Guns to Town" (Takes 1-4)	Previously unreleased	2:46
17.	"Don't Take Your Guns to Town" (Takes 5-6)	Previously unreleased	3:31
18.	"Don't Take Your Guns to Town" (Master)	The Fabulous Johnny Cash	3:04
19.	"I'd Rather Die Young" (Take 1 and Master-Take 2)	The Fabulous Johnny Cash	2:53
20.	"The Shepherd of My Heart" (Takes 1-2 and Master-Take 3)	The Fabulous Johnny Cash	3:31
21.	"Cold Shoulder" (Master-Take 1 and Master-Take 2)	The Unissued Johnny Cash	2:15

== Song information ==
Previously unissued:

- CD 1: tracks 5, 6, 21, 22
- CD 2: tracks 1, 5, 6, 21, 22, 27, 29
- CD 3: tracks 1, 13 to 17, 21, 24, 25
- CD 4: tracks 1, 2, 7, 8,3

CD 5 contains a complete session: false starts, breakdowns, rejected and finished masters of songs recorded on August 13, 1958.

Numbers next to some songs indicate the year of the release.

== Credits ==
- Mastered By - Bob Jones
- Producer - Don Law, Jack Clement, Sam Phillips
- Reissue Producer - Colin Escott, Richard Weize
