= Johnny Cash Sun Records discography =

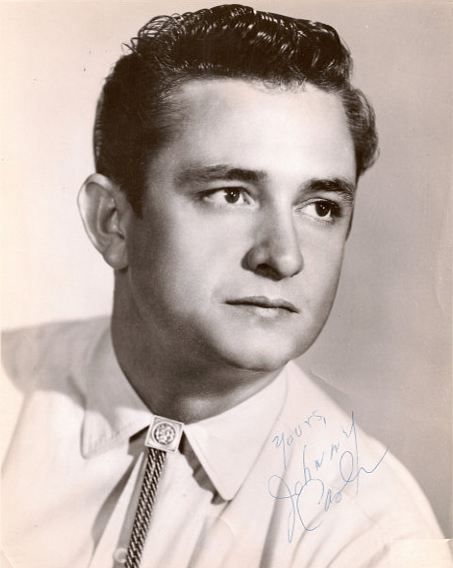
- Studio albums: 18
- Singles: 20
- No.1 Single: 4

The Johnny Cash Sun Records discography details the music recorded by country music legend Johnny Cash and released on Sun Records. From late 1954 to July, 1958, Cash recorded for Sun Records, a label founded by Sam Phillips and located at Sun Studio in Memphis, Tennessee. Despite making his final recordings for Sun in 1958 and subsequently moving to Columbia Records, Phillips amassed sufficient backlog to continue to release new material by Cash in single and album format until as late as 1964.

== LPs ==
Cash was the first Sun artist to release an LP

Year	Album	US Country
1957	Johnny Cash with His Hot and Blue Guitar	
1958	Sings the Songs That Made Him Famous	
1959	Greatest!	
1960	Sings Hank Williams	
1961	Now Here's Johnny Cash	
1962	All Aboard the Blue Train	
1964	Original Sun Sound of Johnny Cash	
1969	Original Golden Hits, Volume I	4
1969	Original Golden Hits, Volume II	3
1969	Story Songs of the Trains and Rivers	2
1969	Get Rhythm	30
1969	Showtime	14
1970	The Singing Storyteller	45
1970	Johnny Cash: The Legend	
1970	Sunday Down South	
1970	The Rough Cut King of Country Music	
1971	Johnny Cash & Jerry Lee Lewis Sing Hank Williams	
1971	Johnny Cash: The Man, His World, His Music	
1972	Original Golden Hits, Volume III	
1977	Superbilly	
1977	The Original Johnny Cash	
1979	Johnny Cash Sings I Walk The Line	
1979	Johnny Cash Sings Folsom Prison Blues	
1980	Johnny Cash Sings The Blue Train	
1980	Johnny Cash Sings The Greatest Hits	
1982	Original Rockabilly	

== Singles ==
The following are the singles released by Sun Records. Cash left Sun for Columbia in July, 1958. Sun continued to release singles through 1964.

Date	#	A Side	Pop	C&W	B Side	Pop	C&W
June 21, 1955	221	"Cry! Cry! Cry!"		14	"Hey Porter!"		
Dec. 15, 1955	232	"So Doggone Lonesome"		4	"Folsom Prison Blues"		4
May 1, 1956	241	"I Walk The Line"	17	1	"Get Rhythm"		
Nov. 21, 1956	258	"There You Go"		1	"Train of Love"		7
April 15, 1957	266	"Next in Line"	99	9	"Don't Make Me Go"		9
Aug. 10, 1957	279	"Home of the Blues"	88	3	"Give My Love to Rose"		13
Dec. 01, 1957	283	"Ballad of a Teenage Queen"	14	1	"Big River"		4
May 20, 1958	295	"Guess Things Happen That Way"	11	1	"Come In Stranger"	66	6
Aug. 11, 1958	302	"The Ways of a Woman in Love"	24	2	"You're the Nearest Thing to Heaven"		5
Nov. 12, 1958	309	"It's Just About Time"	47	30	"I Just Thought You'd Like to Know"		85
Feb. 15, 1959	316	"Luther Played the Boogie"		8	"Thanks a Lot"		12
June 2, 1959	321	"Katy Too"	66	11	"I Forget to Remember to Forget"		
Sept. 15, 1959	331	"You Tell Me"			"Goodbye Little Darlin'"		22
Dec. 31, 1959	334	"Straight A's in Love"	84	16	"I Love You Because"		20
June 14, 1960	343	"The Story of a Broken Heart"	107		"Down the Street to 301"	85	
Oct. 25, 1960	347	"Mean Eyed Cat"		30	"Port of Lonely Hearts"		
Dec. 10, 1960	355	"Oh Lonesome Me"	93	13	"Life Goes On"		
May 26, 1961	363	"Sugartime"			"My Treasure"		
April 27, 1962	376	"Blue Train"			"Born to Lose"		
May 1, 1964	392	"Wide Open Road"			"Belshazah"		

== Sun recording history ==
Between September 1, 1954, and July 17, 1958, Cash recorded several sessions at Memphis Sun Studios. The Sun singles and albums were recorded at the sessions described below; "master" indicates which take of a song was used for singles and albums.

=== Demo session, September 1, 1954 ===
1. "Wide Open Road" (demo) – 2:26
2. "You're My Baby" (demo) – 1:42
3. "My Treasure" (demo) – 2:31
4. "My Treasure" (overdubbed master) – 1:17

=== Demo session, March 22, 1955 ===
1. "Folsom Prison Blues" (demo) – 2:32
2. "Wide Open Road" (demo) – 2:36
3. "Wide Open Road" (demo) – 2:28
4. "My Two Timin' Woman" (demo) – 1:59
5. "Hey Porter" (demo) – 2:13

=== Studio session, September 1, 1954 ===
1. "Hey Porter" (master) – 2:14
2. "Cry, Cry, Cry" (master) – 2:29
3. "Wide Open Road" (master) – 2:24

=== Studio sessions, April 26, 1955 ===
1. "Port of Lonely Hearts" (master) – 2:36
2. "I Couldn't Keep from Crying" (master) – 2:02
3. "New Mexico" (master) – 2:07

=== Studio session, July 30, 1955 ===
1. "Folsom Prison Blues" (master) – 2:50
2. "Luther Played the Boogie" (master) – 2:05
3. "So Doggone Lonesome" (master) – 2:38
4. "Mean Eyed Cat" (master) – 2:30

=== Demo session for KWEM, November 2, 1955 – KWEM Radio Studio, West Memphis, Arkansas ===
1. "Rock 'n' Roll Ruby" (demo) – 1:42

=== Studio session, April 2, 1956 ===
1. "I Walk the Line" (outtake) – 2:41
2. "Brakeman's Blues" (FS+incomplete) – 1:02
3. "Get Rhythm" (outtake, mike test) – 2:16
4. "Get Rhythm" (outtake) – 2:16
5. "I Walk the Line" (master) – 2:46
6. "Get Rhythm" (master) – 2:15
7. "Train of Love" (alternate) – 2:37

=== Studio session, August 8, 1956 ===
1. "Train of Love" (outtake) – 2:20
2. "Train of Love" (master) – 2:24
3. "There You Go" (master) – 2:19

=== Studio session, October 1, 1956 ===
1. "One More Ride" (incomplete) – 0:54

=== Studio session, December 13, 1956 ===
1. "I Love You Because" (outtake) – 2:27
2. "Goodbye Little Darlin'" (overdubbed master) – 2:15
3. "Straight A's in Love" (undubbed master) – 2:14
4. "I Love You Because" (overdubbed master) – 2:28
5. "Straight A's in Love" (overdubbed master) – 2:15

=== Studio session, April 4, 1957 ===
1. "Don't Make Me Go" (outtake) – 2:45
2. "Don't Make Me Go" (outtakes) – 2:53
3. "Don't Make Me Go" (master) – 2:30
4. "Next in Line" (master) – 2:47

=== Studio session, July 1, 1957 ===
1. "Home of the Blues" (undubbed master) – 3:01
2. "Give My Love to Rose" (outtakes) – 3:12
3. "Give My Love to Rose" (outtake) – 2:44
4. "Give My Love to Rose" (master) – 2:46
5. "Home of the Blues" (overdubbed master) – 2:41

=== Studio session, July 13, 1957 ===
1. "Rock Island Line" (master) – 2:11
2. "Wreck of the Old '97" (master) – 1:48
3. "Belshazar" (master) – 2:27

=== Demo session, August 2, 1957 ===
1. "Country Boy" (demo) – 1:49
2. "Leave That Junk Alone" (demo) – 1:30

=== Studio session, August 4, 1957 ===
1. "Doin' My Time" (master) – 2:39
2. "Country Boy" (master) – 1:53
3. "If the Good Lord's Willing" (master) – 1:44
4. "I Heard That Lonesome Whistle Blow" (master) – 2:25
5. "I Was There When It Happened" (outtake) – 2:18
6. "I Was There When It Happened" (master) – 2:17
7. "Remember Me" (master) – 2:48

=== Studio session, November 12, 1957 ===
1. "Big River" (outtakes) – 3:46
2. "Big River" (master) – 2:32
3. "Ballad of a Teenage Queen" (undubbed master) – 2:18

=== Overdub session, November 22, 1957 ===
1. "Goodnight Irene" (overdubbed master) – 2:41
2. "Ballad of a Teenage Queen" (overdubbed master) – 2:14

=== Studio session, December 3, 1957 ===
1. "Come in Stranger" (alternate) – 2:03

=== Studio session, April 9, 1958 ===
1. "Guess Things Happen That Way" (undubbed master) – 1:58
2. "Come in Stranger" (master) – 1:43
3. "Oh Lonesome Me" (undubbed master) – 2:30

=== Overdub session, May 1, 1958 ===
1. "Guess Things Happen That Way" (overdubbed master) – 1:52
2. "Oh Lonesome Me" (overdubbed master) – 2:29

=== Studio session, May 15, 1958 ===
1. "Sugartime" (undubbed master) – 1:46
2. "Born to Lose" (undubbed master) – 2:10
3. "You're the Nearest Thing to Heaven" (undubbed master) – 2:38
4. "You're the Nearest Thing to Heaven" (overdubbed master) – 2:41
5. "Sugartime" (overdubbed master) – 1:46
6. "Born to Lose" (overdubbed master) – 2:11

=== Studio session, May 15, 1958 ===
1. "The Story of a Broken Heart" (outtake) – 2:35
2. "The Story of a Broken Heart" (outtake) – 2:32
3. "The Story of a Broken Heart" (outtakes) – 1:39
4. "The Story of a Broken Heart" (outtakes) – 2:05
5. "The Story of a Broken Heart" (master) – 2:12
6. "Always Alone" (outtakes) – 1:40
7. "Always Alone" (outtake) – 1:13
8. "Always Alone" (master) – 1:52
9. "You Tell Me" (outtakes) – 0:34
10. "You Tell Me" (master) – 1:20
11. "Life Goes On" (master) – 2:01

=== Studio session, May 15, 1958 ===
1. "You Win Again" (false starts) – 0:33
2. "You Win Again" (undubbed master) – 2:17
3. "I Could Never Be Ashamed of You" (undubbed master) – 2:14
4. "Hey Good Lookin'" (undubbed master) – 1:43
5. "I Can't Help It" (undubbed master) – 1:46
6. "Cold, Cold Heart" (undubbed master) – 2:20
7. "You Win Again" (overdubbed master) – 2:18
8. "I Could Never Be Ashamed of You" (overdubbed master) – 2:14
9. "Hey Good Lookin'" (overdubbed master) – 1:43
10. "I Can't Help It" (overdubbed master) – 1:46
11. "Cold, Cold Heart" (overdubbed master) – 2:21

=== Studio session, May 28, 1958 ===
1. "Blue Train" (master) – 2:02
2. "Katy Too" (master) – 1:58

=== Studio session, July 10, 1958 ===
1. "The Ways of a Woman in Love" (ondubbed master) – 2:28
2. "Fools Hall of Fame" (outtake) – 2:25
3. "Fools Hall of Fame" (FS + master) – 2:34
4. "Thanks a Lot" (outtakes) – 3:10
5. "The Ways of a Woman in Love" (overdubbed master) – 2:17
6. "Thanks a Lot" (overdubbed master) – 2:38

=== Studio session, July 17, 1958 ===
1. "It's Just About Time" (undubbed master) – 2:08
2. "I Just Thought You'd Like to Know" (undubbed master) – 2:23
3. "I Forgot to Remember to Forget" (outtake) – 2:07
4. "I Forgot to Remember to Forget" (outtake) – 2:10
5. "It's Just About Time" (overdubbed master) – 2:10
6. "I Just Thought You'd Like to Know" (overdubbed master) – 2:25
7. "I Forgot to Remember to Forget" (overdubbed master) – 1:55
8. "Down the Street to 301" (overdubbed master) – 2:03
