= Johnny Cash: The Complete Columbia Album Collection =

The Complete Columbia Album Collection

Box set by Johnny Cash
- Released: December 4, 2012
- Recorded: 1956–2003
- Genre: Country
- Labels: Columbia; Legacy
- Producers: Gregg Geller; Steve Berkowitz

Johnny Cash chronology
American VI: Ain't No Grave (2010)	The Complete Columbia Album Collection (2012)	Out Among the Stars (2014)

Professional ratings
Aggregate scores
Source	Rating
Metacritic	99/100
Review scores
Source	Rating
AllMusic	4.5/5 stars
Country Weekly	5/5 stars
Q	4/5 stars
Record Collector	4/5 stars
Uncut	10/10
Under the Radar	10/10

The Complete Columbia Album Collection is a box set by country singer Johnny Cash, released posthumously in 2012 on Columbia Records and Legacy Recordings.

The set consists of 63 CDs, the majority of which are reissues of 59 albums released by Cash during his 1958–1986 tenure with Columbia. Each CD is packaged in a replica of the original LP cover, with any albums originally issued as two-LP set condensed onto one disc with the exception of The Gospel Road which remains in a two-CD configuration. Bonus material includes a two-CD set titled The Singles, Plus, compiling non-album tracks and duets taken from other albums; a Carter Family album on which Cash provided guest vocals; the two albums Cash recorded for Columbia as a member of the supergroup The Highwaymen; and an extended edition of the Sun Records album With His Hot and Blue Guitar with additional tracks from the Sun era (including the complete contents of his second Sun album, Sings the Songs That Made Him Famous). Hot and Blue Guitar is the only album to be presented in an extended edition; all other albums are featured with their original contents, without augmentation. As such this is not a complete survey of everything Cash recorded for Columbia; for example, additional performances from the At Folsom Prison and At San Quentin live shows, included on separate reissues of the two albums, are not included. Also omitted is the 1975 album Destination Victoria Station which had featured new performances of previously released recordings, the 1961 Andre Kostelanetz orchestral album The Lure of the Grand Canyon which had been narrated by Cash, the 1980 gospel album A Believer Sings the Truth (recorded for Columbia but released on another label), as well as most of the tracks issued on Columbia's Bootleg series of 2011–2012. Compilation albums that had originally featured previously unreleased tracks (i.e. Heart of Cash) are also skipped in favor of putting most of those tracks in the Singles, Plus set. Out Among the Stars, a complete album recorded by Cash in the early 1980s but not released at that time, is also omitted as it would not be released officially until 2014.

Many of the albums featured in the set make their CD debut in the collection. According to country historian Rich Kienzle's liner notes (part of a 200-page book included in the set), one album Koncert V Praze (In Prague–Live) received its first North American release in the set.

== Album list ==
1. The Fabulous Johnny Cash
2. Hymns by Johnny Cash
3. Songs of Our Soil
4. Now, There Was a Song!
5. Ride This Train
6. Hymns from the Heart
7. The Sound of Johnny Cash
8. Blood, Sweat and Tears
9. Ring of Fire: The Best of Johnny Cash
10. The Christmas Spirit
11. Keep on the Sunny Side – The Carter Family with special guest Johnny Cash
12. I Walk the Line
13. Bitter Tears: Ballads of the American Indian
14. Orange Blossom Special
15. Sings the Ballads of the True West
16. Everybody Loves a Nut
17. Happiness Is You
18. Carryin' On with Johnny Cash and June Carter
19. From Sea to Shining Sea
20. Johnny Cash at Folsom Prison
21. The Holy Land
22. Johnny Cash at San Quentin
23. Hello, I'm Johnny Cash
24. The Johnny Cash Show
25. I Walk the Line
26. Little Fauss and Big Halsy
27. Man in Black
28. A Thing Called Love
29. America: A 200-Year Salute in Story and Song
30. The Johnny Cash Family Christmas
31. Any Old Wind That Blows
32. The Gospel Road (disc 1)
33. The Gospel Road (disc 2)
34. Johnny Cash and His Woman
35. På Österåker
36. Ragged Old Flag
37. Junkie and the Juicehead Minus Me
38. The Johnny Cash Children's Album
39. Sings Precious Memories
40. John R. Cash
41. Look at Them Beans
42. Strawberry Cake
43. One Piece at a Time
44. The Last Gunfighter Ballad
45. The Rambler
46. I Would Like to See You Again
47. Gone Girl
48. Silver
49. Rockabilly Blues
50. Classic Christmas
51. The Baron
52. The Survivors Live – Johnny Cash, Jerry Lee Lewis, Carl Perkins
53. The Adventures of Johnny Cash
54. Johnny 99
55. Koncert V Praze (In Prague–Live)
56. Rainbow
57. Highwayman – Waylon Jennings, Willie Nelson, Johnny Cash, Kris Kristofferson
58. Heroes – Johnny Cash & Waylon Jennings
59. Highwayman 2 – Waylon Jennings, Willie Nelson, Johnny Cash, Kris Kristofferson
60. At Madison Square Garden

Disc 61: Johnny Cash with His Hot and Blue Guitar
No.	Title	Original Release	Length
1.	"Rock Island Line"	With His Hot and Blue Guitar
2.	"(I Heard That) Lonesome Whistle"	With His Hot and Blue Guitar
3.	"Country Boy"	With His Hot and Blue Guitar
4.	"If The Good Lord's Willing"	With His Hot and Blue Guitar
5.	"Cry! Cry! Cry!"	Single A-side/With His Hot and Blue Guitar
6.	"Remember Me (I'm the One Who Loves You)"	With His Hot and Blue Guitar
7.	"So Doggone Lonesome"	Single A-side/With His Hot and Blue Guitar
8.	"I Was There When It Happened"	With His Hot and Blue Guitar
9.	"I Walk the Line"	Single A-side/With His Hot and Blue Guitar
10.	"The Wreck of the Old 97"	With His Hot and Blue Guitar
11.	"Folsom Prison Blues"	"So Doggone Lonesome" B-side/With His Hot and Blue Guitar
12.	"Doin' My Time"	With His Hot and Blue Guitar
13.	"Luther Played the Boogie"	Single A-side
14.	"Hey Porter"	"Cry! Cry Cry!" B-side
15.	"Get Rhythm"	"I Walk the Line" B-side
16.	"Ballad of a Teenage Queen"	Single A-side
17.	"There You Go"	Single A-side
18.	"Come In Stranger"	"Guess Things Happen That Way" B-side
19.	"Don't Make Me Go"	"Next in Line" B-side
20.	"Train of Love"	"There You Go" B-side
21.	"Guess Things Happen That Way"	Single A-side
22.	"The Ways of a Woman in Love"	Single A-side
23.	"Next in Line"	Single A-side
24.	"You're the Nearest Thing to Heaven"	"The Ways of a Woman in Love" B-side
25.	"I Can't Help It (if I'm Still in Love with You)"	Sings the Songs That Made Him Famous
26.	"Home of the Blues"	Single A-side
27.	"Big River"	"Ballad of a Teenage Queen" B-side
28.	"Give My Love to Rose"	"Home of the Blues" B-side

Note: Tracks 1–12 are the original album line-up; Tracks 13–28 are exclusive to this reissue.

Disc 62: The Singles, Plus (disc 1)
No.	Title	Original Release	Length
1.	"All Over Again"	Single A-side
2.	"You Dreamer You"	"Frankie's Man Johnny" B-side
3.	"I Got Stripes"	Single A-side
4.	"I'll Remember You"	"Little Drummer Boy" B-side
5.	"Lorena"	The Rebel – Johnny Yuma EP
6.	"Smiling Bill McCall"	"Seasons of My Heart" B-side
7.	"Second Honeymoon"	"Honky Tonk Girl" B-side
8.	"Girl in Saskatoon"	Single A-side
9.	"Locomotive Man"	"Girl in Saskatoon" B-side
10.	"Tall Men"	"Tennessee Flat-Top Box" B-side
11.	"A Little at a Time"	"In the Jailhouse Now" B-side
12.	"Pick a Bale o' Cotton"	"Bonanza" B-side
13.	"Send a Picture of Mother"	"Busted" B-side
14.	"The Matador"	Single A-side
15.	"Dark as a Dungeon"	"Understand Your Man" B-side
16.	"Hammers and Nails" (with The Statler Brothers)	Single A-side
17.	"Time and Time Again"	"It Ain't Me Babe" B-side
18.	"The Sons of Katie Elder"	Single A-side
19.	"A Certain Kinda Hurtin'"	"The Sons of Katie Elder" B-side
20.	"Cotton Pickin' Hands"	"The One On The Right Is On The Left" B-side
21.	"Bottom of a Mountain"	"Boa Constrictor" B-side
22.	"You Beat All I Ever Saw"	Single A-side
23.	"Put the Sugar to Bed"	"You Beat All I Ever Saw" B-side
24.	"The Wind Changes"	Single A-side
25.	"Red Velvet"	"The Wind Changes" B-side
26.	"Rosanna's Going Wild"	Single A-side
27.	"Roll Call"	"Rosanna's Going Wild" B-side
28.	"The Folk Singer"	"Folsom Prison Blues" B-side
29.	"Girl from the North Country" (with Bob Dylan)	Nashville Skyline
30.	"What Is Truth"	Single A-side
31.	"A Little Bit Of Yesterday"	"Man in Black" B-side
32.	"A Song to Mama" (with The Carter Family)	Travelin' Minstrel Band

Disc 63: The Singles, Plus (disc 2)
No.	Title	Original Release	Length
1.	"No Need to Worry" (with June Carter Cash)	Single A-side
2.	"I'll Be Loving You" (with June Carter Cash)	"No Need to Worry" B-side
3.	"A Front Row Seat To Hear Old Johnny Sing" (with Shel Silverstein)	Single A-side
4.	"The World Needs a Melody" (with The Carter Family)	Travelin' Minstrel Band
5.	"Help Me Make It Through the Night" (with June Carter Cash)	"The Loving Gift" B-side
6.	"Praise the Lord and Pass the Soup" (with The Carter Family and The Oak Ridge Boys)	Single A-side
7.	"The Ballad of Barbara" (with The Carter Family)	"Praise the Lord and Pass the Soup" B-side
8.	"Pick the Wildwood Flower" (with Maybelle Carter)	Single A-side
9.	"Diamonds in the Rough" (with Maybelle Carter)	"Pick the Wildwood Flower" B-side
10.	"Song to Woody" (with Earl Scruggs)	Anniversary Special Vol. 1
11.	"Hey Porter" (with Earl Scruggs)	Anniversary Special Vol. 1
12.	"I Still Miss Someone" (with Earl Scruggs)	Anniversary Special Vol. 2
13.	"My Ship Will Sail" (with Earl Scruggs)	Anniversary Special Vol. 2
14.	"It's All Over"	Single A-side
15.	"Old Time Feeling" (with June Carter Cash)	Single A-side
16.	"Song of the Patriot" (with Marty Robbins)	Single A-side
17.	"I Will Dance with You"	"The Baron" B-side
18.	"The General Lee"	The Dukes of Hazzard TV episode
19.	"Crazy Old Soldier" (with Ray Charles)	Friendship
20.	"The Chicken in Black"	Single A-side
21.	"Battle of Nashville"	"The Chicken in Black" B-side
22.	"They Killed Him"	Single A-side
23.	"The Three Bells"	"They Killed Him" B-side
24.	"The Human Condition" (with Waylon Jennings, Kris Kristofferson and Willie Nelson)	"The Highwayman" B-side
