= List of songs recorded by Johnny Cash =

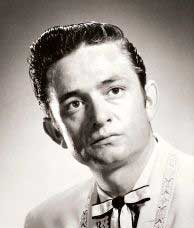
Johnny Cash promotional picture for Sun Records, 1955.

This is an alphabetical list of the songs known to have been recorded, written, and/or performed by Johnny Cash between the beginning of his career in 1954 and his death in 2003.

== 0-9 ==
- "The 20th Century Is Almost Over"
- "25 Minutes to Go"
- "706 Union"

== A ==
- "Abner Brown"
- "Accidentally on Purpose"
- "Adios Aloha"
- "Adulterous Woman"
- "After All"
- "After Taxes"
- "After the Ball"
- "Against the Wind"
- "Agony in Gethsemane"
- "Ah Bos Cee Dah"
- "Ain't Gonna Hobo No more"
- "Ain't Gonna Work Tomorrow"
- "Ain't No Grave"
- "Ain't You Ashamed"
- "All Around Cowboy"
- "All I Do Is Drive"
- "All Of God's Children Ain't Free"
- "All Over Again"
- "Allegheny"
- "Aloha Oe"
- "Always Alone"
- "Always on My Mind"
- "Amen"
- "American Remains"
- "American by Birth"
- "American Trilogy"
- "Ancient History"
- "And Now He's Alone"
- "Angel And the Badman"
- "Angel Band"
- "Angels Love Bad Men"
- "Another Broken Hearted Girl"
- "Another Man Done Gone"
- "Another Song to Sing"
- "Another Wide River to Cross"
- "Anthem '84"
- "Any Old Wind That Blows"
- "Apache Tears"
- "Appalachian Pride"
- "Are All the Children In"
- "Are You Washed In The Blood"
- "Arkansas Lovin' Man"
- "As Long as I Live"
- "As Long as The Grass Shall Grow"
- "Ascension Amen Chorus"
- "At Calvary"
- "At the Cross"
- "At the Wailing Wall"
- "Austin Prison"
- "Away in a Manger"

== B ==
- "(I'm Proud The) Baby Is Mine"
- "Baby Ride Easy"
- "Back In The Saddle Again"
- "A Backstage Pass"
- "Bad News"
- "Ballad Of A Teenage Queen"
- "The Ballad Of Annie Palmer"
- "The Ballad Of Barbara"
- "The Ballad Of Boot Hill"
- "The Ballad Of Forty Dollars"
- "The Ballad Of Jesse James"
- "The Ballad of Ira Hayes"
- "Ballad Of Little Fauss And Big Halsy"
- "Ballad Of The Ark"
- "Ballad Of The Harp Weaver"
- "Bandana"
- "The Banks Of The Ohio"
- "The Baron"
- "The Battle Of Nashville"
- "The Battle Of New Orleans"
- "Be Careful Who You Love (Arthur's Song)"
- "Beans For Breakfast"
- "The Beast In Me"
- "A Beautiful Day"
- "Beautiful Life"
- "Beautiful Memphis"
- "Beautiful Words"
- "Before My Time"
- "Begin West Movement"
- "Believe In Him"
- "A Believer Sings The Truth"
- "Belshazzar"
- "Ben Dewberry's Final Run"
- "Besser so, Jenny-Joe" [Original German song]
- "Best Friend"
- "Best of All Possible Worlds"
- "Better Class Of Losers"
- "Big Balls In Nashville"
- "The Big Battle"
- "Big Foot"
- "Big Iron"
- "The Big Light"
- "Big River"
- "Big Train (From Memphis)"
- "Bill's Theme"
- "Billy And Rex And Oral And Bob"
- "Billy Brown"
- "Bird On A Wire"
- "A Bird With A Broken Wing"
- "Blessed Are"
- "Blistered"
- "The Blizzard"
- "Blue Bandana"
- "Blue Christmas"
- "Blue Train"
- "Blueberry Hill"
- "Blues For Two"
- "The Blues Keep Gettin' Bluer"
- "Blue Yodel #1"
- "Blue Yodel #5"
- "Boa Constrictor"
- "Bonanza!"
- "Boogie"
- "Borderline (A Musical Whodunit)"
- "Born And Raised In Black And White"
- "Born To Lose"
- "Boss Jack"
- "Bottom Of A Mountain"
- "A Boy Named Sue"
- "Brakeman's Blues"
- "Brand New Dance"
- "Breaking Bread"
- "Bridge Over Troubled Water"
- "Broken Freedom Song"
- "Broken Hearted Lover"
- "Brown Eyes"
- "Brown-Eyed Handsome Man"
- "The Bug That Tried To Crawl Around The World"
- "Bull Rider"
- "Burden Of Freedom"
- "Bury Me Not On The Lone Prairie"
- "Busted"

== C ==
- "Cajun Born"
- "Calilou"
- "Call Daddy From The Mine(s)"
- "Call Me The Breeze"
- "Call Of The Wild"
- "Can't Help But Wonder Where I'm Bound"
- "Careless Love"
- "The Caretaker"
- "Casey"
- "Casey Jones"
- "Casey's Last Ride"
- "Cat's in the Cradle"
- "The Cattle Call"
- "'Cause I Love You"
- "A Ceiling, Four Walls, And A Floor"
- "A Certain Kinda Hurtin'"
- "Chain Gang"
- "Change The Locks"
- "Chattanooga City Limit Sign"
- "Chattanooga Sugarbabe"
- "The Chicken In Black"
- "Children"
- "Children, Go Where I Send Thee"
- "Choosing Of Twelve Disciples"
- "Christmas As I Knew It"
- "The Christmas Guest"
- "The Christmas Spirit"
- "Christmas Time's A Comin'"
- "Christmas With You"
- "(I'm Just An Old) Chunk Of Coal (But I'll Be A Diamond Someday)"
- "Church In The Wildwood"
- "Church Of The Holy Sepulchre"
- "Cindy"
- "Cindy, I Love You"
- "Cisco Clifton's Fillin' Station"
- "City Jail"
- "City Of New Orleans"
- "Class Of '55"
- "Clean Your Own Tables"
- "Clementine"
- "Close The Door Lightly"
- "Closer To The Bone"
- "Cloudburst"
- "Cocaine Blues"
- "Cocaine Carolina"
- "Cold Shoulder"
- "Cold, Cold Heart"
- "Cold, Lonesome Morning"
- "The Color Of Love"
- "Come Along And Ride This Train"
- "Come In, Stranger"
- "Come Take A Trip In My Airship"
- "Come To The Wailing Wall"
- "Come Unto Me"
- "Coming Home"
- "Committed To Parkview"
- "Concerning Your New Song"
- "The Continuance"
- "Cool Water"
- "Cotton Fields"
- "Cotton Pickin' Hands"
- "Country Boy"
- "Country Pie"
- "Country Trash"
- "The Cowboy Who Started The Fight"
- "The Cowboy's Prayer"
- "Cowboys And Ladies"
- "Crazy"
- "Crazy Old Soldier"
- "The Cremation of Sam McGee"
- "A Croft In Clachan (The Ballad Of Rob MacDunn)"
- "Crossing The Sea Of Galilee"
- "Crucifixion"
- "Cry! Cry! Cry!"
- "Crystal Chandeliers And Burgundy"
- "Cuban Soldier"
- "A Cup Of Coffee"
- "Custer"

== D ==
- "Daddy"
- "Daddy Sang Bass"
- "The Danger Zone"
- "Danny Boy"
- "Dark As A Dungeon"
- "Darling Am I The One"
- "Darlin' Companion"
- "Daughter Of A Railroad Man"
- "A Day In The Grand Canyon"
- "Dear Mrs."
- "Death And Hell"
- "The Death Of Me"
- "Delia's Gone"
- "Deportee (Plane Wreck At Los Gatos)"
- "Desperado"
- "Desperados Waiting For A Train"
- "Destination Victoria Station"
- "Detroit City"
- "The Devil Comes Back to Georgia"
- "The Devil To Pay"
- "The Devil's Right Hand"
- "Diamonds In The Rough"
- "Didn't It Rain"
- "Dinosaur Song"
- "The Diplomat"
- "Dirty Old Egg-Suckin' Dog"
- "Do Lord"
- "Do What You Do, Do Well"
- "Doesn't Anybody Know My Name"
- "Doin' My Time"
- "Don't Go Near The Water"
- "Don't Make Me Go"
- "Don't Sell Daddy Any More Whiskey"
- "Don't Step On Mother's Roses"
- "Don't Take Anyone To Be Your Friend (Don't Take Everybody For Your Friend)"
- "Don't Take Your Guns To Town"
- "Don't Think Twice, It's Alright"
- "Dorraine Of Ponchartrain"
- "Down At Drippin' Springs"
- "Down In The Valley"
- "Down The Line"
- "Down The Road I Go"
- "Down The Street To 301"
- "Down There By The Train"
- "The Drifter"
- "Drink To Me Only With Thine Eyes"
- "Drive On"
- "Drums"
- "Duelin' Dukes"

== E ==
- "Earthquake And Darkness"
- "East Virginia Blues"
- "Easy Street"
- "Empty Chair"
- "The End Of Understanding"
- "Engine 143 (One-Forty-Three)"
- "The Engineer's Dying Child"
- "Even Cowgirls Get The Blues"
- "The Evening Train"
- "Everybody Loves A Nut"
- "Everybody's Trying To Be My Baby"
- "Everyone Gets Crazy"
- "Everything Is Beautiful"

== F ==
- "Face Of Despair"
- "Fair And Tender Ladies"
- "Fair Weather Friends"
- "Family Bible"
- "Far Away Places"
- "Far Side Banks Of Jordan"
- "Farmer's Almanac"
- "Farther Along"
- "Fast Boat to Sydney"
- "A Fast Song"
- "Father And Daughter (Father And Son)"
- "Feast Of The Passover"
- "Feeding The Multitude"
- "Field Of Diamonds"
- "Figgy Puddin'"
- "The First Noel"
- "First Time Ever I Saw Your Face"
- "Fisher's Of Men"
- "Five Feet High And Rising"
- "Five Minutes To Live"
- "Flesh And Blood"
- "The Flint Arrowhead"
- "Flushed From The Bathroom Of Your Heart"
- "Fly Little Bird"
- "The Folk Singer"
- "Folks Out On The Road"
- "Follow Me"
- "Follow Me Jesus"
- "Folsom Prison Blues"
- "Fools Hall Of Fame"
- "Foolish Questions"
- "For Lovin' Me"
- "For The Good Times"
- "For You"
- "Forever Young"
- "Forty Shades Of Green"
- "Four Months To Live"
- "Four Strong Winds"
- "The Fourth Man (In The Fire)"
- "Frankie's Man, Johnny"
- "Friendly Gates"
- "Friends In California"
- "From Sea To Shining Sea"
- "A Front Row Seat to Hear Ole Johnny Sing"
- "The Frozen Four Hundred Pound Fair To Middlin' Cotton Picker"
- "The Frozen Logger"
- "Fuego De'amor" [Spanish version of Ring of Fire]
- "Funny How Time Slips Away"
- "Further On (Up The Road)"

== G ==
- "Gadsby's Restaurant"
- "Galway Bay"
- "The Gambler"
- "Gathering Flowers For The Beautiful Bouquet"
- "Gathering Flowers From The Hillside"
- "The General Lee"
- "Gentle On My Mind"
- "Georgia On A Fast Train"
- "Get in Line, Brother"
- "Get Rhythm"
- "The Gettysburg Address"
- "(Ghost) Riders In The Sky"
- "The Gifts They Gave"
- "Girl from the Canyon"
- "Girl from the North Country"
- "Girl in Saskatoon"
- "Give It Away"
- "Give Me Back My Job"
- "Give My Love To Rose"
- "Go On Blues"
- "Go Wild"
- "God Ain't No Stained Glass Window"
- "God Bless Robert E Lee"
- "God Is Not Dead"
- "God Must Have My Fortune Laid Away"
- "God Will"
- "God's Gonna Cut You Down"
- "God's Hands"
- "Godshine"
- "Goin' by the Book"
- "Goin' Down the Road Feelin' Bad"
- "Going to Memphis"
- "Gone"
- "Gone Girl"
- "The Good Earth"
- "Good Morning Friend"
- "Good Old American Guest"
- "Good Old Mountain Dew"
- "The Good, the Bad, and the Cookie Kid"
- "Goodbye Little Darlin'"
- "Goodnight Irene"
- "Gospel Boogie"
- "Gospel Road"
- "Gospel Ship"
- "(My) Grandfather's Clock"
- "Great Commission"
- "The Great Speckle(d) Bird"
- "Greater Love Hath No Man"
- "The Greatest Cowboy of Them All"
- "Greatest Love Affair"
- "Green Grow the Lilacs"
- "Green, Green Grass of Home"
- "Greystone Chapel"
- "Guess Things Happen That Way"

== H ==
- "A Half a Mile a Day"
- "Hammers and Nails"
- "Hank and Joe and Me"
- "Happiness Is You"
- "Happy to Be with You"
- "Hard Times (Come Again No More)"
- "Hard Times Comin'"
- "The Hard Way"
- "Hardin Wouldn't Run"
- "Hark! The Herald Angels Sing"
- "Harley"
- "Have A Drink Of Water"
- "Have Thine Own Way Lord"
- "Have You Ever Seen the Rain"
- "He Is Risen"
- "He Stopped Loving Her Today"
- "He Touched Me"
- "He Turned The Water Into Wine"
- "He'll Be A Friend"
- "He'll Understand and Say Well Done"
- "He's Alive"
- "Heart Of Gold"
- "Heartbeat"
- "Heavy Metal (Don't Mean Rock And Roll To Me)"
- "Hello Again"
- "Hello Out There"
- "Help Him, Jesus"
- "Help Me"
- "Help Me Make It Through The Night"
- "Here Comes that Rainbow Again"
- "Here Was A Man"
- "Heroes"
- "Heroes In Black And White"
- "Hey Good Lookin'"
- "Hey Hey Train"
- "Hey, Porter"
- "Hiawatha's Vision"
- "Hidden Shame"
- "High Heel Sneakers"
- "Highway Patrolman"
- "The Highwayman"
- "Hit The Road And Go"
- "The Hobo Song"
- "Home of the Blues"
- "Honky Tonk Girl"
- "The House Is Falling Down"
- "How Beautiful Heaven Must Be"
- "How Did You Get Away From Me"
- "How Great Thou Art"
- "The Human Condition"
- "Hung My Head"
- "Hungry"
- "Hurt"
- "Hurt So Bad"

== I ==
- "I Ain't A Song"
- "I Am A Pilgrim"
- "I Am The Nation"
- "(I Been To) Georgia On A Fast Train"
- "I Call Him"
- "I Came To Believe"
- "I Can't Go On That Way"
- "I Can't Help It (If I'm Still In Love With You)"
- "I Corinthians 15:55"
- "I Could Never Be Ashamed Of You"
- "I Couldn't Keep from Crying"
- "I Do Believe"
- "I Don't Believe You Wanted To Leave"
- "I Don't Hurt Anymore"
- "I Don't Know Where I'm Bound"
- "I Don't Think I Could Take You Back Again"
- "I Dreamed About Mama Last Night"
- "I Drove Her Out of My Mind"
- "I Feel Better All Over"
- "I Forgot More Than You'll Ever Know"
- "I Forgot To Remember To Forget"
- "I Got A Boy (And His Name Is John)"
- "I Got a Woman"
- "I Got Shoes"
- "I Got Stripes"
- "I Hardly Ever Sing Beer Drinking Songs"
- "[[[I Heard That] Lonesome Whistle]]"
- "I Heard The Bells On Christmas Day"
- "I Hung My Head"
- "I Just Thought You'd Like To Know"
- "I Love You Because"
- "I Love You Sweetheart"
- "I Love You, Love You"
- "I Never Got To Know Him Very Well"
- "I Never Met A Man Like You Before"
- "I Never Picked Cotton"
- "I Promise You"
- "I Ride An Old Paint"
- "I Saw A Man"
- "I Saw The Light"
- "I See A Darkness"
- "I See Men As Trees Walking"
- "I Shall Be Free"
- "I Shall Not Be Moved"
- "I Still Miss Someone"
- "I Talk To Jesus Every Day"
- "I Threw It All Away"
- "I Tremble For You"
- "I Walk The Line"
- "I Want To Go Home"
- "I Wanted So"
- "I Was There When It Happened (So I Guess I Ought To Know)"
- "I Washed My Face In The Morning Dew"
- "I Will Dance With You"
- "I Will Miss You When You Go"
- "I Will Rock and Roll with You"
- "I Wish I Was Crazy Again"
- "I Witness a Crime"
- "I Won't Back Down" (feat. Tom Petty)
- "I Won't Have to Cross Jordan Alone"
- "I Would Like to See You Again"
- "I'd Just Be Fool Enough (To Fall)"
- "I'd Rather Die Young"
- "I'd Rather Have You"
- "I'd Still Be There"
- "I'll Always Love You (in My Own Crazy Way)"
- "I'll Be All Smiles Tonight"
- "I'll Be Home for Christmas"
- "I'll Be Loving You"
- "I'll Cross Over Jordon Someday"
- "I'll Fly Away"
- "I'll Go Somewhere And Sing My Songs Again"
- "I'll Have a New Life"
- "I'll Remember You"
- "I'll Say It's True"
- "I'll Take You Home Again Kathleen"
- "I'm A Drifter"
- "I'm A Newborn Man"
- "I'm A Worried Man"
- "I'm Alright Now"
- "I'm An Easy Rider"
- "I'm An Old Cow Hand"
- "I'm Bound For The Promised Land"
- "I'm Free From The Chain Gang Now"
- "I'm Going To Memphis"
- "I'm Gonna Sit On The Porch And Pick On My Old Guitar"
- "I'm Gonna Try To Be That Way"
- "I'm Here To Get My Baby Out Of Jail"
- "(I'm Just An Old) Chunk Of Coal (But I'll Be A Diamond Someday)"
- "I'm Leavin' Now"
- "I'm Movin' On"
- "I'm Never Gonna Roam Again"
- "I'm On Fire"
- "(I'm Proud) The Baby Is Mine"
- "I'm Ragged but I'm Right"
- "I'm So Lonesome I Could Cry"
- "I'm Thinking Tonight of My Blue Eyes"
- "I'm Working On A Building"
- "I've Always Been Crazy"
- "I've Been Everywhere"
- "I've Been Saved"
- "I've Been Working On The Railroad"
- "I've Got A Thing About Trains"
- "I've Got Jesus In My Soul"
- "I've Never Met A Man Like You Before"
- "If He Came Back Again"
- "If I Give My Soul"
- "If I Had A Hammer"
- "If I Were A Carpenter"
- "If It Wasn't For The Wabash River"
- "If Jesus Ever Loved A Woman"
- "If Not For Love"
- "If The Good Lord's Willing"
- "If We Never Meet Again This Side Of Heaven"
- "If You Could Read My Mind"
- "Impersonations"
- "Interlude"
- "In A Young Girl's Mind"
- "In Bethlehem"
- "In God's Hands"
- "In My Life"
- "In Our Mind"
- "In The Garden"
- "In The Garden Of Gethsemane"
- "In The Jailhouse Now"
- "In The Sweet By And By"
- "(In Them Old) Cotton Fields (Back Home)"
- "In Virginia" [Original German song]
- "In Your Mind"
- "Introduction Under The Double Eagle"
- "The Invertebrates"
- "Is This My Destiny"
- "It Ain't Gonna Worry My Mind"
- "It Ain't Me, Babe"
- "It Ain't Nothin' New Babe"
- "It Came Upon A Midnight Clear"
- "It Comes And Goes"
- "It Could Be You (Instead Of Him)"
- "It Is No Secret (What God Can Do)"
- "It Is What It Is"
- "It Takes One to Know Me"
- "It Was Jesus (Who Was It?)"
- "It'll Be Her"
- "It's a Sin to Tell a Lie"
- "It's All Over"
- "It's Alright"
- "It's Just About Time"

== J ==
- "Jackson"
- "Jacob Green"
- "Jealous Loving Heart"
- "Jeri And Nina's Melody"
- "Jesus"
- "Jesus and Children"
- "Jesus and Nicodemus"
- "Jesus Announces His Divinity"
- "Jesus Appears to Disciples"
- "Jesus Before Caiaphas, Pilate, and Herod"
- "Jesus Cleanses Temple"
- "Jesus Cleanses Temple Again"
- "Jesus In My Soul (I've Got Jesus in My Soul)"
- "Jesus in the Temple"
- "Jesus Is Lord"
- "Jesus Upbraids Scribes and Pharisees"
- "Jesus Was a Carpenter"
- "Jesus Was Our Saviour (Cotton Was Our King)"
- "Jesus Wept"
- "Jesus' Death"
- "Jesus' Early Years"
- "Jesus' Entry Into Jerusalem"
- "Jesus' First Miracle"
- "Jesus' Last Words"
- "Jesus' Opposition Is Established"
- "Jesus' Second Coming"
- "Jesus' Teachings"
- "Jim, I Wore a Tie Today"
- "Jingle Bells"
- "Joe Bean"
- "John 14-1-3"
- "John Henry"
- "John the Baptist"
- "John the Baptist's Imprisonment And Death"
- "John's"
- "Johnny 99"
- "Johnny Reb"
- "Jordan"
- "Joshua Gone Barbados"
- "Joy to the World"
- "The Junkie and the Juicehead (Minus Me)"
- "Just a Closer Walk with Thee"
- "Just About Time"
- "Just As I Am"
- "Just One More"
- "Just the Other Side of Nowhere"

== K ==
- "Kate"
- "Kathy"
- "Katy Too"
- "Keep on the Sunny Side"
- "Keep Your Eyes on Jesus"
- "Kentucky Straight"
- "King of Love"
- "King of The Hill"
- "Kleine Rosmarie" [Original German song]
- "The Kneeling Drunkard's Plea To"

== L ==
- "The L and N Don't Stop Here Anymore"
- "Lady"
- "The Lady Came from Baltimore"
- "Land of Israel"
- "The Last Cowboy Song"
- "Last Date"
- "The Last Gunfighter Ballad"
- "Last Night I Had the Strangest Dream"
- "The Last of the Drifters"
- "Last Supper"
- "The Last Thing on my Mind"
- "The Last Time"
- "Lately"
- "Lately I Been Leanin' Toward The Blues"
- "Lay Back With My Woman"
- "Lay Me Down in Dixie"
- "Lead Me Father"
- "Lead Me Gently Home (Father)"
- "Leave That Junk Alone"
- "[[[I'd Be] A Legend in My Time|A Legend in My Time]]"
- "The Legend of John Henry's Hammer"
- "Let America Be America Again"
- "Let Him Roll"
- "Let Me Down Easy"
- "Let Me Help You Carry This Weight"
- "Let The Lower Lights Be Burning (Running)"
- "Let The Train Blow the Whistle"
- "Let There Be Country"
- "Let Those Brown Eyes Smile at Me"
- "The Letter Edged in Black"
- "Letter(s) From Home"
- "Life Goes On"
- "Life Has Its Little Ups and Downs"
- "Life of a Prisoner"
- "Life's Railway to Heaven"
- "Lights of Magdala"
- "Like a Soldier"
- "Like a Young Colt"
- "Like the 309"
- "The Lily of the Valley"
- "A Little at a Time"
- "Little Bit of Yesterday"
- "The Little Drummer Boy"
- "Little Gray Donkey"
- "Little Green Fountain"
- "Little Magic Glasses"
- "Little Man"
- "Little Mockingbird"
- "Live Forever"
- "Living Legend"
- "Living the Blues"
- "Living Water and the Bread of Life"
- "Loading Coal"
- "Locomotive Man"
- "Lonesome to the Bone"
- "Lonesome Valley"
- "(I Heard That) Lonesome Whistle (Blow)"
- "The Long Black Veil"
- "Long Legged Guitar Pickin' Man"
- "Look at Them Beans"
- "Look For Me"
- "Look Unto the East"
- "Lookin' Back in Anger"
- "Lord Is It I"
- "Lord Take These Hands"
- "Lord, I'm Coming Home"
- "Lord, Lord, Lord"
- "Lord's Prayer Amen Chorus"
- "Lorena"
- "Losin' You"
- "Losing Kind"
- "Lost on the Desert"
- "Louisiana Man"
- "Love Has Lost Again"
- "Love Is a Gambler"
- "Love Is My Refuge"
- "Love Is the Way"
- "Love Me Like You Used To"
- "Love Me Tender"
- "The Love That Never Failed"
- "Love's Been Good To Me"
- "Lovin' Locomotive Man"
- "The Loving Gift"
- "Lower Lights"
- "Lumberjack"
- "Luther Played The Boogie (Luther's Boogie)"

== M ==
- "Mama, You've Been On My Mind"
- "Mama's Baby"
- "The Man Comes Around"
- "Man In Black"
- "Man In White"
- "The Man On The Hill"
- "The Man Who Couldn't Cry"
- "Mariners And Musicians"
- "Mary Magdalene Returns To Galilee"
- "Mary Of The Wild Moor"
- "The Masterpiece"
- "The Matador"
- "Matchbox"
- "Matthew 24 (Is Knocking At The Door)"
- "Me And Bobby McGee"
- "Me And Paul"
- "Mean As Hell"
- "Mean-Eyed Cat"
- "Meet Me In Heaven"
- "Melva's Wine"
- "Memories Are Made Of This"
- "Mercy Seat"
- "Merry Christmas Mary"
- "Michigan City Howdy Do"
- "Miller's Cave"
- "The Miracle Man"
- "Miss Tara"
- "Mississippi Delta Land"
- "Mississippi Sand"
- "Missouri Waltz"
- "Mister Garfield"
- "Mobile Bay"
- "Monteagle Mountain"
- "More Jesus Teaching"
- "Mother Maybelle"
- "Mother's Love"
- "Mountain Dew"
- "Mountain Lady"
- "Movin'"
- "Mr Garfield"
- "Mr Lonesome"
- "Muddy Waters"
- "My Children Walk In Truth"
- "My Clinch Mountain Home"
- "My Cowboy's Last Ride"
- "My God Is Real (Yes, God Is Real)"
- "(My) Grandfather's Clock"
- "My Merry Christmas Song"
- "My Mother Was A Lady"
- "My Old Faded Rose"
- "My Old Kentucky Home (Turpentine And Dandelion Wine)"
- "My Ship Will Sail"
- "My Shoes Keep Walking Back To You"
- "My Treasure"
- "My Wife June At Sea Of Galilee"
- "The Mystery Of Life"
- "Mystery Of Number Five"

== N ==
- "Nashville Skyline Rag"
- "Nasty Dan"
- "Navajo"
- "Nazarene"
- "Ned Kelly"
- "Never Grow Old"
- "New Cut Road"
- "New Mexico"
- "New Moon Over Jamaica"
- "(I'm A) Newborn Man"
- "News Conference"
- "Next In Line"
- "Next Time I'm In Town"
- "The Night Hank Williams Came To Town"
- "Night Life"
- "The Night They Drove Old Dixie Down"
- "Nine Pound Hammer"
- "No Charge"
- "No Earthly Good"
- "No Expectations"
- "No Need To Worry"
- "No, No, No"
- "No One Will Ever Know"
- "No Setting Sun"
- "Nobody"
- "Nobody Cared"

== O ==
- "O Christmas Tree"
- "O Come All Ye Faithful"
- "O Little Town Of Bethlehem"
- "Oh Bury Me Not On The Lone Prairie"
- "Oh Come, Angel Band"
- "Oh Lonesome Me"
- "Oh, What A Dream"
- "Oh, What A Good Thing We Had"
- "The Old Account Was Settled Long Ago"
- "Old Apache Squaw"
- "(I'm Just An) Old Chunk Of Coal (But I'll Be A Diamond Someday)"
- "Old Doc Brown"
- "Old Fashioned Tree"
- "Old Gospel Ship"
- "The Old Rugged Cross"
- "Old Shep"
- "The Old Spinning Wheel"
- "Old Time Feeling"
- "Ole Slew Foot"
- "On The Evening Train"
- "On The Line"
- "On The Road Again"
- "On The Trail"
- "On The Via Dolorosa"
- "On Wheels And Wings"
- "Once Before I Die"
- "One"
- "One And One Makes Two"
- "One More Ride"
- "One Of These Days I'm Gonna Sit Down And Talk To Paul"
- "The One On The Right Is On The Left"
- "One Piece At A Time"
- "The One Rose (That's Left In My Heart)"
- "One Too Many Mornings"
- "One Way Rider"
- "Oney"
- "Only Love"
- "Opening The West"
- "Orange Blossom Special"
- "Orleans Parish Prison"
- "Orphan Of The Road"
- "Our Guide Jacob At Mount Tabor"
- "Out Among The Stars"
- "Outside Looking In"
- "Over The Next Hill"
- "Over There"

== P ==
- "Pack Up Your Sorrows"
- "Painted Desert"
- "Papa Was a Good Man"
- "Parable of the Good Shepherd"
- "Paradise"
- "Passin' Thru"
- "Paul Revere"
- "[[[There'll Be] Peace in the Valley [for Me]]]"
- "Peggy Day"
- "Personal Jesus"
- "Pick a Bale o' Cotton"
- "Pick the Wildwood Flower"
- "Pick Up the Tempo"
- "Pickin' Time"
- "Pie in the Sky"
- "The Pilgrim"
- "The Pine Tree"
- "Please Don't Let Me Out"
- "Please Don't Play Red River Valley"
- "Pocahontas"
- "Poor Valley Girl"
- "Port Of Lonely Hearts"
- "Praise The Lord And Pass The Soup"
- "The Preacher Said, "Jesus Said""
- "Precious Memories"
- "The Prisoner's Song"
- "A Proud Land"
- "Put The Sugar To Bed"

== R ==
- "Ragged Old Flag"
- "Raising of Lazarus"
- "Reaching for the Stars"
- "Reason to Believe"
- "The Rebel – Johnny Yuma"
- "Red Velvet"
- "Redemption"
- "Redemption Day"
- "Redemption Song"
- "Reflections"
- "Relief Is Just A Swallow Away"
- "[[[Remember Me] I'm the One Who Loves You]]"
- "Remember The Alamo"
- "Restless"
- "Return To The Promised Land"
- "The Reverend Mr. Black"
- "Ride This Train"
- "[[[Ghost] Riders in the Sky]]"
- "Ridin' On The Cotton Belt"
- "Ring Of Fire"
- "Ringing The Bells For Jim"
- "Riot In Cell Block No 9"
- "The Road Goes On Forever"
- "The Road To Kaintuck"
- "Rock And Roll (Fais-Do-Do)"
- "Rock And Roll Ruby"
- "Rock And Roll Shoes"
- "Rock Island Line"
- "Rock Of Ages"
- "Rockabilly Blues (Texas 1955)"
- "Rocket 69"
- "Rodeo Hand"
- "Roll Call"
- "Rollin' Free"
- "Rosanna's Going Wild"
- "Rose Of My Heart"
- "Roughneck"
- "Route #1, Box 144"
- "Rowboat"
- "Run Softly, Blue River"
- "The Running Kind"
- "Rusty Cage"

== S ==
- "Saginaw, Michigan"
- "Sailor On A Concrete Sea"
- "Salty Dog"
- "Sam Hall"
- "Sam Stone"
- "San Quentin"
- "Sanctified"
- "A Satisfied Mind"
- "Saturday Night In Hickman County"
- "Sea of Heartbreak"
- "Seal It In My Heart And Mind"
- "Seasons Of My Heart"
- "Second Honeymoon"
- "See Ruby Fall"
- "Send A Picture Of Mother"
- "September When It Comes"
- "Sermon On The Mount"
- "Shamrock Doesn't Grow In California"
- "Shantytown"
- "She Came from the Mountains"
- "She's A Go-Er"
- "Shepherd Of My Heart"
- "The Shifting, Whispering Sands"
- "Shrimpin' Sailin'"
- "Silent Night"
- "(That) Silver Haired Daddy Of Mine"
- "Silver Stallion"
- "Sing A Song"
- "Sing A Travelin' Song"
- "Sing It Pretty, Sue"
- "A Singer Of Songs"
- "Singin' In Vietnam Talkin' Blues"
- "The Singing Star's Queen"
- "Single Girl, Married Girl"
- "Six Days On The Road"
- "Six Gun Shooting"
- "Six White Horses"
- "Sixteen Tons"
- "Slow Rider"
- "Smiling Bill McCall"
- "Smokey Factory Blues"
- "Snow In His Hair"
- "So Do I"
- "So Doggone Lonesome"
- "Softly And Tenderly"
- "Sold Out of Flagpoles"
- "Soldier Boy"
- "Soldier's Last Letter"
- "Solitary Man"
- "Someday My Ship Will Sail"
- "A Song For The Life"
- "Song Of The Coward"
- "Song Of The Patriot"
- "A Song To Mama"
- "Song To Woody"
- "Songs That Make A Difference"
- "The Sons Of Katie Elder"
- "The Sound Of Laughter"
- "Southern Accents"
- "Southern Comfort"
- "Southwestward"
- "Southwind"
- "Spanish Harlem"
- "Spiritual"
- "Stampede"
- "Standing on the Promises"
- "Starkville City Jail"
- "State of the Nation"
- "Steel Guitar Rag"
- "Still in Town"
- "The Story of a Broken Heart"
- "Straight A's in Love"
- "Strange Things Happen Every Day (There Are Strange Things Happening Every Day)"
- "Strawberry Cake"
- "The Streets of Laredo"
- "Suffer Little Children"
- "Sugartime"
- "Sunday Mornin' Comin' Down"
- "Sunrise"
- "Sunset"
- "Suppertime"
- "Sweet Betsy from Pike"
- "Sweeter Than The Flowers"
- "Swing Low, Sweet Chariot"

== T ==
- "T Is For Texas"
- "Take Me Home"
- "The Talking Leaves"
- "Tall Man"
- "Taller Than Trees"
- "Tear Stained Letter"
- "Tears In The Holston River"
- "Tell Him I'm Gone"
- "Temptation"
- "The Ten Commandments"
- "The Ten Commandments Of Love"
- "Tennessee Flat-Top Box"
- "Tennessee Stud"
- "Texas"
- "Texas 1947"
- "Thanks A Lot"
- "Thanks To You"
- "That Christmasy Feeling"
- "That Lucky Old Sun (Just Rolls Around Heaven All Day)"
- "That Old Time Feeling"
- "That Old Wheel"
- "That Silver Haired Daddy Of Mine"
- "That's All Over"
- "That's Alright Mama"
- "That's Enough"
- "That's How I Got To Memphis"
- "That's One You Owe Me"
- "That's The Truth"
- "That's The Way It Is"
- "That's What It's Like To Be Lonesome"
- "There Ain't No Easy Run"
- "There Ain't No Good Chain Gang"
- "There Are Strange Things Happening Every Day"
- "There Is (There's) A Bear In The Woods"
- "There You Go"
- "(There'll Be) Peace In The Valley (For Me)"
- "These Are My People"
- "These Things Shall Pass"
- "They Killed Him"
- "They're All The Same"
- "A Thing Called Love"
- "Thirteen"
- "This Is Nazareth"
- "This Land Is Your Land"
- "This Ole House"
- "This Side Of The Law"
- "This Town"
- "This Train Is Bound For Glory"
- "Thoughts On The Flag"
- "The Three Bells"
- "Thunderball"
- "Tiger Whitehead"
- "The Timber Man"
- "Time And Time Again"
- "Time Changes Everything"
- "Time Of The Preacher"
- "To All The Girls I've Loved Before"
- "To Beat The Devil"
- "To The Shining Mountains"
- "Tonight I'll Be Staying Here With You"
- "Tony"
- "Too Little, Too Late"
- "Town Of Cana"
- "Train Of Love"
- "Transfusion Blues"
- "The Troubadour"
- "Trouble In Mind"
- "Troublesome Waters"
- "True Love Is Greater Than Friendship"
- "True Love Travels A Gravel Road"
- "The Twentieth Century Is Almost Over"
- "Two Greatest Commandments"
- "Two Old Army Pals"
- "Two Stories Wide"
- "Two Timin' Woman"

== U ==
- "Unchained"
- "Uncloudy Day"
- "Under The Double Eagle"
- "Understand Your Man"
- "Unwed Fathers"

== V ==
- "The Vanishing Race"
- "Vaya Con Dios"
- "The Very Biggest Circus Of Them All"
- "Veteran's Day"
- "Viel zu spät" [German version of "I Got Stripes"]
- "Virgien"

== W ==
- "W. Lee O Daniel (And The Light Crust Dough Boys)"
- "Wabash Blues"
- "The Wabash Cannonball"
- "Waiting For A Long Time"
- "Waiting For A Southern Train"
- "Waiting For A Train"
- "Walkin' The Blues"
- "The Wall"
- "The Walls Of A Prison"
- "The Wanderer"
- "Walk the Line"
- "Wanted Man"
- "Water From The Wells Of Home"
- "Wayfaring Stranger"
- "Waymore's Blues"
- "The Ways Of A Woman In Love"
- "The Wayworn Traveler"
- "We Are The Shepherds"
- "We Must Believe In Magic"
- "We Ought To Be Ashamed"
- "We Remember The King"
- "We'll Meet Again"
- "We're All In Your Corner"
- "We're For Love"
- "Wednesday Car"
- "Welcome Back Jesus"
- "Welfare Line"
- "Wer kennt den Weg" [German version of I Walk the Line]
- "Were You There (When They Crucified My Lord)"
- "West Canterbury Subdivision Blues"
- "The West"
- "What Child Is This"
- "What Do I Care"
- "What Have You Got Planned Tonight, Diana"
- "What I've Learned"
- "What Is Man"
- "What Is Truth"
- "What On Earth (Will You Do For Heaven's Sake)"
- "What'd I Say"
- "What's Good For You (Should Be Alright For Me)"
- "When He Comes"
- "When He Reached Down His Hand For Me"
- "When I Look"
- "When I Stop Dreaming"
- "When I Take My Vacation In Heaven"
- "When I'm Gray"
- "When I've Learned (Enough To Die)"
- "When It's Springtime In Alaska (It's Forty Below)"
- "When Papa Played The Dobro"
- "(When) The Man Comes Around"
- "When The Roll Is Called Up Yonder"
- "When The Roses Bloom Again"
- "When The Saviour Reached Down For Me"
- "When Uncle Bill Quit Dope"
- "When You Are Twenty One"
- "Where Did We Go Right"
- "Where I Found You"
- "Where The Soul Of Man Never Dies"
- "Where We'll Never Grow Old"
- "While I've Got It On My Mind"
- "The Whirl And The Suck"
- "White Christmas"
- "White Girl"
- "Who At My Door Is Standing"
- "Who Kept The Sheep"
- "Who's Gene Autry?"
- "Why Do You Punish Me (For Loving You)"
- "Why Is A Fire Engine Red"
- "Why Me, Lord?"
- "Wichita Lineman"
- "Wide Open Road"
- "Wilderness Temptation"
- "Wildwood Flower"
- "Wildwood In The Pines"
- "Will The Circle Be Unbroken"
- "Will You Miss Me When I'm Gone"
- "The Wind Changes"
- "The Winding Stream"
- "Wings In The Morning"
- "Without Love"
- "Wo ist Zuhause, Mama" [German version of Five Feet High and Rising]
- "W-O-M-A-N"
- "The Wonder Of You"
- "A Wonderful Time Up There"
- "Woodcarver"
- "The World Needs A Melody"
- "World's Gonna Fall On You"
- "Worried Man"
- "Worried Man Blues"
- "Worried Mind"
- "Would You Lay with Me (In a Field of Stone)"
- "A Wound Time Can't Erase"
- "The Wreck Of The Old 97"
- "Wrinkled, Crinkled, Wadded Dollar Bill"

== Y ==
- "You And Me"
- "You And Tennessee"
- "You Are My Sunshine"
- "You Are (You're) The Nearest Thing To Heaven"
- "You Beat All I Ever Saw"
- "You Can't Beat Jesus Christ"
- "You Comb Her Hair"
- "You Dreamer You"
- "You Give Me Music"
- "You (Just) Can't Beat Jesus Christ"
- "You Remembered Me"
- "You Tell Me"
- "You Wild Colorado"
- "You Win Again"
- "You Won't Have Far to Go"
- "You'll Be All Right"
- "You'll Get Yours And I'll Get Mine"
- "You'll Never Walk Alone"
- "You're Driftin' Away"
- "You're Home Sweet Home To Me"
- "You're My Baby (Little Woolly Booger)"
- "You're So Close To Me"
- "You're The Nearest Thing To Heaven"
- "You've Got A New Light Shining In Your Eyes"
