= The Legend (Johnny Cash box set) =

Box set by Johnny Cash
- Released: August 2, 2005
- Recorded: 1955–2003
- Genres: Country; rockabilly; folk; gospel
- Length: 5:05:24
- Labels: Columbia; Legacy

Johnny Cash chronology
My Mother's Hymn Book (2004)	The Legend (2005)	The Legend of Johnny Cash (2005)

Professional ratings
Review scores
Source	Rating
AllMusic	link
Pitchfork Media	9.0/10 link
Robert Christgau	A link
Tom Hull	A

The Legend is a box set by country singer Johnny Cash, (his 91st overall release) released in 2005 on Columbia Records and Legacy Recordings. It is one of the few multi-disc sets that contain songs recorded throughout Cash's entire career, from 1955 to 2003. Over four CDs, most of Cash's biggest hits are covered, in addition to numerous traditional compositions Cash recorded versions of, and several collaborations with other known artists, including Rosanne Cash, U2 and Bob Dylan. In keeping with Cash's persona as the Man in Black, the data surface of the discs is black. In 2006, the set won the Grammy Award for Best Boxed or Special Limited Edition Package. It was certified Gold on January 11, 2006, by the RIAA.

== Track listing ==
=== Disc 1 – Win, Place and Show: The Hits ===
The first disc includes many of Cash's biggest hits, as well as his more well-known material from the 1970s and 1980s. A few tracks appear however for the first time on CD.

1. "I Walk the Line" – 2:45
2. "There You Go" – 2:17
3. "Home of the Blues" – 2:40
4. "Ballad of a Teenage Queen" – 2:12
5. "Guess Things Happen That Way" – 1:50
6. "The Ways of a Woman in Love" – 2:16
7. "Don't Take Your Guns to Town" – 3:03
8. "Ring of Fire" – 2:37
9. "The Matador" – 2:46
10. "Understand Your Man" – 2:43
11. "The Ballad of Ira Hayes" – 4:09
12. "Orange Blossom Special" – 3:07
13. "The One on the Right is on the Left" – 2:48
14. "Rosanna's Going Wild" – 1:59
15. "Folsom Prison Blues" – 2:45
16. "Daddy Sang Bass" – 2:21
17. "A Boy Named Sue" – 3:46
18. "What Is Truth" – 2:38
19. "Sunday Mornin' Comin' Down" – 4:07
20. "Flesh and Blood" – 2:37
21. "Man in Black" – 2:52
22. "A Thing Called Love" – 2:33
23. "Kate" – 2:17
24. "Oney" – 3:05
25. "Any Old Wind That Blows" – 2:46
26. "One Piece at a Time" – 4:01
27. "(Ghost) Riders in the Sky" – 3:46

=== Disc 2 – Old Favorites and New ===
The second disc was compiled in a similar fashion to the first, also including some of Cash's early hits, like "Hey Porter" and "Cry! Cry! Cry!", the first single he released for Sun Records. It also contains several previously unreleased tracks, a selection of his later work and a number of songs from At Folsom Prison.

1. "Hey Porter" – 2:14
2. "Cry! Cry! Cry!" – 2:25
3. "Luther Played the Boogie" – 2:03
4. "Get Rhythm" – 2:14
5. "Give My Love to Rose" – 2:45
6. "I Was There When It Happened" – 2:16
7. "Big River" – 2:32
8. "I Still Miss Someone" – 2:36
9. "Pickin' Time" – 1:58
10. "The Man on the Hill" – 2:09
11. "Five Feet High and Rising" – 1:47
12. "Tennessee Flat Top Box" – 2:59
13. "I Got Stripes" – 2:04
14. "Troublesome Waters" – 3:51
15. "The Long Black Veil" – 3:07
16. "Dark as a Dungeon" – 2:28
17. "The Wall" – 2:12
18. "25 Minutes to Go" – 3:12
19. "Cocaine Blues" – 2:51
20. "Doin' My Time" – 4:13
21. "I Will Rock and Roll with You" – 2:51
22. "Without Love" – 2:30
23. "The Big Light" – 2:41
24. "Highway Patrolman" – 5:21
25. "I'm Never Gonna Roam Again" – 2:34
26. "When I'm Gray" – 3:33
27. "Forever Young" – 6:16

=== Disc 3 – The Great American Songbook ===
The third disc is made up primarily of traditional American compositions that have been recorded by many artists.

1. "Wreck of the Old 97" – 1:47
2. "Rock Island Line" – 2:11
3. "Goodnight Irene" – 2:40
4. "Goodbye, Little Darlin'" – 2:15
5. "Born to Lose" – 2:10
6. "Walking the Blues" – 2:13
7. "Frankie's Man, Johnny" – 2:17
8. "Delia's Gone" – 3:02 (with alternate lyrics)
9. "In the Jailhouse Now" – 2:23
10. "Waiting for a Train" – 2:07
11. "Casey Jones" – 3:02
12. "The Legend of John Henry's Hammer" – 8:26
13. "I've Been Working on the Railroad" – 3:26
14. "Sweet Betsy from Pike" – 3:18
15. "The Streets of Laredo" – 3:40
16. "Bury Me Not on the Lone Prairie" – 2:28
17. "Down in the Valley" – 3:11
18. "Wabash Cannonball" – 2:40
19. "The Great Speckled Bird" – 2:08
20. "Wildwood Flower" – 2:12
21. "Cotton Fields" – 2:34
22. "Pick a Bale o'Cotton" – 1:58
23. "Old Shep" – 2:23
24. "I'll Be All Smiles Tonight" – 2:48
25. "I'm So Lonesome I Could Cry" – 2:39
26. "Time Changes Everything" – 1:48

=== Disc 4 – Family and Friends ===
The fourth disc includes collaborations with Cash's family members and well-known country musicians.

1. "Keep on the Sunny Side" (with the Carter Family) – 2:16
2. "Diamonds in the Rough" (with Mother Maybelle Carter) – 3:10
3. "(There'll Be) Peace in the Valley" (The Carter Family) – 2:48
4. "Were You There (When They Crucified My Lord)" (with The Carter Family) – 3:56
5. "Another Man Done Gone" (with Anita Carter) – 2:36
6. "Pick the Wildwood Flower" (with Mother Maybelle Carter) – 2:59
7. "Jackson" (with June Carter) – 2:46
8. "If I Were a Carpenter" (with June Carter) – 3:00
9. "Girl from the North Country" (with Bob Dylan) – 3:42
10. "One More Ride" (with Marty Stuart) – 3:27
11. "You Can't Beat Jesus Christ" (with Billy Joe Shaver) – 3:39
12. "There Ain't No Good Chain Gang" (with Waylon Jennings) – 3:17
13. "We Oughta Be Ashamed" (with Elvis Costello) – 2:45
14. "Crazy Old Soldier" (with Ray Charles) – 3:34
15. "Silver Haired Daddy of Mine" (with Tommy Cash) – 2:48
16. "Who's Gene Autry?" (with John Carter Cash) – 3:51
17. "The Night Hank Williams Came to Town" (with Waylon Jennings) – 3:24
18. "I Walk the Line (Revisited)" (with Rodney Crowell) – 3:51
19. "Highwayman" (with The Highwaymen, Kris Kristofferson, Willie Nelson, and Waylon Jennings) – 3:03
20. "The Wanderer" (with U2) – 4:43
21. "September When It Comes" (with Rosanne Cash) – 3:39
22. "Tears in the Holston River" (with The Nitty Gritty Dirt Band) – 3:41
23. "Far Side Banks of Jordan" (with June Carter) – 2:42
24. "It Takes One to Know Me" (with June Carter) – 3:36

== Limited edition ==
A limited edition of the boxset features a bonus CD of a 1955 radio performance, a bonus DVD of a March 12, 1980 CBS television special, and a 57-page lyric book.

== Personnel ==
- Johnny Cash – Vocals, Acoustic Guitar, Guitar, Producer, Arranger, Adaptation
- Cindy Cash, June Carter Cash, Rosanne Cash, Anita Carter, Ray Charles, Kris Kristofferson – Vocals
- Carlene Carter – Vocals, Background Vocals
- Elvis Costello, Bob Dylan, Billy Joe Shaver – Vocals, Acoustic Guitar
- Willie Nelson – Vocals, Guitar
- Waylon Jennings – Vocals, Guitar, Producer
- Maybelle Carter – Vocals, Autoharp, Acoustic Guitar
- Rodney Crowell – Vocals, Acoustic Guitar, Electric Guitar, Producer
- Bill Abbott, Hoyt Axton, Barbara Bennett, Ed Bruce, Sara Bruce, The Carter Family, Don Carter, Tommy Cash, Laura Cash, Donivan Cowart, The Confederates, The Evangel Temple Choir, Lee Holt, Jan Howard, The Jordanaires, Lynn Langham, The Gene Lowery Singers, Cyd Mosteller, Louis Dean Nunley, Judy Rodman, Nita Smith, Wendy Suits, Hershel Wigginton, Asa Wilkerson, Malcolm Yelvington – Background Vocals
- John Carter Cash – Background Vocals, Acoustic Guitar, Producer, Executive Producer
- Luther Perkins – The guitar soloist picker
- Marshall Grant – Background Vocals, Bass
- The Edge – Background Vocals, Synthesizer, Producer
- Bob Carter – Harmony Vocals, Accordion
- Jeff Hanna – Harmony Vocals, National Steel Guitar
- Jimmy Ibbotson – Harmony Vocals, Mandolin
- James Burton, Helen Carter, J.R. Cobb, Ray Edenton, Jerry Hensley, Red Lane, Roy Nichols, Jerry Shook, Pete Wade, Doc Watson, Merle Watson, Johnny Western – Guitar
- Billy Sanford – Guitar, Acoustic Guitar
- Randy Scruggs – Guitar, Acoustic Guitar, Producer
- Norman Blake – Guitar, Dobro
- Tim Goodman – Guitar, Banjo
- Bob Johnson – Guitar, Banjo, Lute, Mandocello
- Jack Clement – Guitar, Rhythm Guitar, Producer
- Marty Stuart – Guitar, Mandolin, Producer
- Brian Ahern – Guitar, Tambourine, Producer
- Chips Moman, Jack Routh – Guitar, Producer
- Pete Drake, Don Helms, Ralph Mooney – Steel Guitar
- Dale Sellers – Acoustic Guitar
- Martin Belmont, Pete Bordonali, Carl Perkins, Jerry Reed, Billy Lee Riley, Stewart Smith, Bob Wootton, Reggie Young – Electric Guitar
- Dave Edmunds – Electric Guitar, Producer
- Robby Turner – Dobro, Steel Guitar
- David Mansfield – Mandocello
- John McEuen – Mandolin
- Gordon Terry – Fiddle
- Hal Blaine, Ritchie Albright, Gene Chrisman, Owen Hale, Buddy Harman, W.S. Holland, Greg Morrow, Pete Thomas, J.M. Van Eaton – Drums
- Kenny Malone, Shawn Pelton – Percussion, Drums
- Farrell Morris, Richard Morris – Percussion
- Chuck Turner – Percussion, Engineer
- Joe "Public" Allen, Floyd Chance, T. Michael Coleman, Roy Goin, Byron House, Mike Leech, Nick Lowe, Gary Lunn, Gordon Payne, Michael Rhodes, Jerry Sheff, Henry Strzelecki, Jimmy Tittle – Bass
- John Leventhal – Bass, Guitar, Keyboards, Producer
- Chuck Cochran, Floyd Cramer, Marvin Hughes, Larry McCoy, Bill Pursell, Clifford Robertson, Jimmy Smith, Jimmy Wilson – Piano
- Clayton Ivey – Piano, Organ
- Earl Ball – Piano, Producer
- Benmont Tench – Electric Piano
- Paul Davis, Bobby Emmons, Glen D. Hardin, Hargus "Pig" Robbins, Bobby Wood – Keyboards
- Larry Butler – Keyboards, Producer
- Joe Babcock, Bobby Thompson – Banjo
- Jimmie Fadden – Harmonica
- Larry Farrell – Trombone
- Karl Garvin, Bill McElhiney – Trumpet
- Jack Hale, Bob Lewin – Trumpet, Horn, French Horn
- Jay Patten – Horn
- Tony Kladeck – Flugelhorn
- Rufus Long – Flute
- Charlie McCoy, Danny Petraitis – Harmonica
- Terry McMillan – Harmonica, Percussion
- Shane Keister – Synthesizer
- Brian Eno – Synthesizer, Producer

=== Additional personnel ===
- Charlie Bragg, Don Davis, Bob Johnston, Frank Jones, Don Law, Sam Phillips, Billy Sherrill – Producers
- Flood – Producer, Loops
- Gregg Geller – Producer, Liner Notes, Compilation
- Lou Robin – Executive Producer
- J.J. Blair – Engineer
- Vic Anesini – Mastering
- Ian Cuttler – Art Direction, Design
- David Santana – Graphic Design
- Marc Burckhardt – Illustrations
- Sabeen Ahmad, Elizabeth Reilly – Photo Research
- Gisela Delgado, Jerri Meyer – Package Production
- Abe Vélez – Packaging Manager
- Steven Berkowitz – A&R
- Stacey Boyle – A&R
- Patti Matheny – A&R
- Mark "Speedy" Gonzalez, Mark Petaccia – Production Assistants
- John R. "Ricky" Jackson – Project Director
- John A. Lomax – Adaptation, Collection
- Patrick Carr – Liner Notes

== Chart performance ==
Chart (2005)	Peak position
U.S. Billboard Top Country Albums	31
U.S. Billboard 200	173

== Certifications ==
Certifications for the Legend
Region	Certification	Certified units/sales
New Zealand (RMNZ)	Platinum	15,000^{‡}
^{‡} Sales+streaming figures based on certification alone.
