= The Legend of Johnny Cash Vol. II =

The Legend of Johnny Cash, Vol. II

Compilation album by Johnny Cash
- Released: November 21, 2006
- Recorded: 1955–2002
- Genre: Country; folk; gospel
- Label: Island
- Producer: Rick Rubin

Johnny Cash chronology
American V: A Hundred Highways (2006)	The Legend of Johnny Cash, Vol. II (2006)	American VI: Ain't No Grave (2010)

Professional ratings
Review scores
Source	Rating
AllMusic	3.5/5 stars

The Legend of Johnny Cash, Vol. II is a compilation album by Johnny Cash, released posthumously on Island Records in 2006. The release was a result of the success of the 2005 career-spanning compilation The Legend of Johnny Cash. The follow-up similarly includes songs performed by Cash at various stages of his career, starting from "There You Go" from the mid-1950s and ending on a number of selections from the singer's American series, including a version of "In the Sweet By and By" from My Mother's Hymn Book and a live, orchestral version of Leonard Cohen's "Bird on a Wire".

== Track listing ==
No.	Title	Writer(s)	Length
1.	"There You Go"	Cash	2:18
2.	"Home of the Blues"	Cash, Douglas, McAlpin	2:40
3.	"Ballad of a Teenage Queen"	Clement	2:10
4.	"The Ways of a Woman in Love"	Justis, Rich	2:15
5.	"I Still Miss Someone"	Cash, Cash	2:36
6.	"Don't Take Your Guns to Town"	Cash	3:04
7.	"The Long Black Veil"	Dill, Wilkin	3:07
8.	"The Ballad of Ira Hayes"	Lafarge	4:09
9.	"It Ain't Me Babe"	Dylan	3:04
10.	"Girl from the North Country" (duet with Bob Dylan; from his album Nashville Skyline)	Dylan	3:42
11.	"Daddy Sang Bass"	Perkins	2:21
12.	"Flesh and Blood"	Cash	2:37
13.	"The Night Hank Williams Came to Town"	Braddock, Williams	3:24
14.	"That Old Wheel"	Pierce	2:52
15.	"The Beast in Me"	Lowe	2:46
16.	"Unchained"	Johnstone	2:51
17.	"I Won't Back Down"	Lynne, Petty	2:08
18.	"I Hung My Head"	Sting	3:53
19.	"Bird on a Wire" (live)	Cohen	4:10
20.	"In the Sweet By-and-By"	Traditional	2:24

== Charts ==
Chart performance for The Legend of Johnny Cash, Vol. II
Chart (2006)	Peak position
US Top Country Albums (Billboard)	28
US Billboard 200	144
