= Johnny Cash Sings the Songs That Made Him Famous =

Compilation album by Johnny Cash
- Released: December 1, 1958
- Recorded: April 2, 1956 – July 10, 1958
- Genres: Country; rockabilly; rock and roll
- Length: Original: 28:57; Re-issue: 38:08
- Label: Sun
- Producers: Sam Phillips; Jack Clement

Johnny Cash chronology
The Fabulous Johnny Cash (1958)	Johnny Cash Sings the Songs That Made Him Famous (1958)	Hymns by Johnny Cash (1959)

Singles from Johnny Cash Sings the Songs That Made Him Famous
- 1. "There You Go" Released: November 21, 1956; 2. "Next in Line" Released: April 15, 1957; 3. "Home of the Blues" Released: August 10, 1957; 4. "Ballad of a Teenage Queen" Released: December 1, 1957; 5. "Guess Things Happen That Way" Released: May 20, 1958; 6. "The Ways of a Woman in Love" Released: August 11, 1958

Professional ratings
Review scores
Source	Rating
AllMusic	link
The Rolling Stone Album Guide	4/5 stars

Johnny Cash Sings the Songs That Made Him Famous is an album by American singer-songwriter Johnny Cash, released on December 1, 1958, by Sun Records. It was the first LP album to include the songs. However, since the album includes songs previously issued as singles, it has been classified as a compilation album. The album is made up of songs Cash recorded for Sun prior to leaving the label for Columbia Records.

The album was re-issued in 2003, under the label Varèse Sarabande, with four different versions of songs already available on the original LP as bonus tracks. The complete contents of the album are also incorporated into an extended version of the previous collection With His Hot and Blue Guitar included in the 2012 box set Johnny Cash: The Complete Columbia Album Collection. In 2017 and again in 2023, Sun released a remastered version of the album.

== Track listing ==
Side one
No.	Title	Writer(s)	Length
1.	"Ballad of a Teenage Queen"	Jack Clement	2:13
2.	"There You Go"	Johnny Cash	2:19
3.	"I Walk the Line"	Cash	2:46
4.	"Don't Make Me Go"	Cash	2:31
5.	"Guess Things Happen That Way"	Clement	1:52
6.	"Train of Love"	Cash	2:24

Side two
No.	Title	Writer(s)	Length
7.	"The Ways of a Woman in Love"	Bill Justis, Charlie Rich	2:16
8.	"Next in Line"	Cash	2:49
9.	"You're the Nearest Thing to Heaven"	Jim Atkins, Cash, Hoyt Johnson	2:42
10.	"I Can't Help It"	Hank Williams	1:49
11.	"Home of the Blues"	Cash, Douglas Glenn Tubb, Lillie McAlpin	2:41
12.	"Big River"	Cash	2:35

Re-issue Bonus tracks
No.	Title	Writer(s)	Length
13.	"Don't Make Me Go" (Alternate Take)	Cash	2:30
14.	"The Ways of a Woman in Love" (Alternate Take)	Justis, Rich	2:28
15.	"Ballad of a Teenage Queen" (Undubbed Master)	Clement	2:15
16.	"Guess Things Happen That Way" (Undubbed Master)	Clement	1:58
Total length:			38:08

== Personnel ==
- Johnny Cash — vocals, rhythm guitar
- Luther Perkins - lead guitar
- Marshall Grant - double bass

Technical

- Sam Phillips - producer
- Jack Clement - producer
- Cary E. Mansfield — reissue producer
- Bill Dahl — liner notes, reissue producer
- Dan Hersch — digital remastering
- Bill Pitzonka — reissue art director

== Charts ==
Singles - Billboard (United States)

Year	Single	Chart	Position
1956	"There You Go"	Country Singles	1
1957	"Don't Make Me Go"	Country Singles	9
1957	"Home of the Blues"	Country Singles	3
1957	"Home of the Blues"	Pop Singles	88
1957	"Next in Line"	Country Singles	9
1957	"Next in Line"	Pop Singles	99
1957	"Train of Love"	Country Singles	7
1958	"Ballad of a Teenage Queen"	Country Singles	1
1958	"Ballad of a Teenage Queen"	Pop Singles	14
1958	"Big River"	Country Singles	4
1958	"Big River"	Pop Singles	14
1958	"Guess Things Happen That Way"	Country Singles	1
1958	"Guess Things Happen That Way"	Pop Singles	11
1958	"The Ways of a Woman in Love"	Country Singles	2
1958	"The Ways of a Woman in Love"	Pop Singles	24
1958	"You're the Nearest Thing to Heaven"	Country Singles	5
1958	"You're the Nearest Thing to Heaven"	Pop Singles	24
