= All Aboard the Blue Train with Johnny Cash =

All Aboard the Blue Train

Compilation album by Johnny Cash
- Released: 1962
- Recorded: September 1, 1954–May 28, 1958
- Genres: Rockabilly; country
- Length: Original: 27:47; Re-issue: 39:52
- Label: Sun
- Producers: Sam Phillips; Jack Clement; Cary E. Mansfield; Bill Dahl

Johnny Cash chronology
The Sound of Johnny Cash (1962)	All Aboard the Blue Train (1962)	Blood, Sweat and Tears (1963)

Singles from All Aboard the Blue Train
- 1. "Blue Train" Released: April 27, 1962

Professional ratings
Review scores
Source	Rating
AllMusic	4/5 stars

All Aboard the Blue Train is a compilation album by American singer-songwriter Johnny Cash. It was released in 1962 by Sun Records after Cash had left the label and signed with Columbia Records. The album is made up of songs Cash recorded for Sun prior to leaving the label. The album was re-issued in 2003 Varèse Sarabande, with six bonus tracks.

== Track listing ==
Side one
No.	Title	Writer(s)	Length
1.	"Blue Train"	Billy Smith	2:03
2.	"There You Go"	Cash	2:19
3.	"Train of Love"	Cash	2:24
4.	"Goodbye Little Darlin' Goodbye"	Gene Autry, Johnny Marvin	2:15
5.	"I Heard That Lonesome Whistle"	Jimmie Davis, Hank Williams	2:26
6.	"Come In Stranger"	Cash	1:43

Side two
No.	Title	Writer(s)	Length
7.	"Rock Island Line"	Lead Belly	2:13
8.	"Give My Love to Rose"	Cash	2:46
9.	"Hey, Porter"	Cash	2:15
10.	"Folsom Prison Blues"	Cash	2:51
11.	"Wreck of the Old '97"	Norman Blake, Cash, Bob Johnson	1:48
12.	"So Doggone Lonesome"	Cash	2:44

Bonus tracks
No.	Title	Writer(s)	Length
13.	"Train of Love" (Alternate Take)	Cash	2:38
14.	"Give My Love to Rose" (Alternate Take)	Cash	2:54
15.	"Hey, Porter" (Alternate Take)	Cash	2:13
16.	"Leave That Junk Alone"	Cash	1:31
17.	"You're My Baby (Little Woolly Booger)" (Undubbed Version)	Cash	1:31
18.	"Brakeman's Blues" (Incomplete Take)	Jimmie Rodgers	1:18
Total length:			39:52
