= Wide Open Road =

Wide Open Road may refer to:

- Wide Open Road (The Triffids song)
- Wide Open Road (Johnny Cash song)
