= Johnny Cash Sings Hank Williams =

Compilation album by Johnny Cash
- Released: 1960
- Recorded: July 30, 1955–May 15, 1958
- Genres: Country; rockabilly
- Length: 27:59
- Language: English
- Label: Sun
- Producers: Sam Phillips; Jack Clement

Johnny Cash chronology
Ride This Train (1960)	Johnny Cash Sings Hank Williams (1960)	Now Here's Johnny Cash (1961)

Singles from Johnny Cash Sings Hank Williams
- 1. "Straight A's in Love" Released: 1959; 2. "Mean-Eyed Cat" Released: 1960

Professional ratings
Review scores
Source	Rating
Allmusic	3/5 stars
The Rolling Stone Album Guide	3/5 stars

Sings Hank Williams is a compilation album by American singer-songwriter Johnny Cash. It was released in 1960 by Sun Records after Cash had left the label and signed with Columbia Records. Despite the title, the album does not exclusively cover Hank Williams material, but is also made up of songs that Cash recorded for Sun prior to leaving the label. The album was re-issued in 2003 by Varèse Sarabande with five bonus tracks, two of them being alternate recordings of songs already available on the album.

Only the first four of the twelve tracks on the album were written by Williams, with most of the others being written by Cash. (Additional songs composed by Williams are included in the 2003 reissue.) About half of the songs on the album had previously been issued on LP by Sun. Making their album debut are the tracks "Straight A's in Love", "Come In Stranger", "Give My Love to Rose", "Mean-Eyed Cat" and "I Love You Because".

== Track listing ==
All tracks are written by Johnny Cash, except where indicated.

Side one
No.	Title	Writer(s)	Length
1.	"I Can't Help It (If I'm Still in Love with You)"	Hank Williams	1:45
2.	"You Win Again"	Williams	2:18
3.	"Hey, Good Lookin'"	Williams	1:41
4.	"I Could Never Be Ashamed of You"	Williams	2:14
5.	"Next in Line"		2:48
6.	"Straight A's in Love"		2:15

Side two
No.	Title	Writer(s)	Length
7.	"Folsom Prison Blues"		2:49
8.	"Give My Love to Rose"		2:45
9.	"I Walk the Line"		2:46
10.	"I Love You Because"	Leon Payne	2:26
11.	"Come In Stranger"		1:42
12.	"Mean Eyed Cat"		2:30

Bonus tracks
No.	Title	Writer(s)	Length
13.	"Cold, Cold Heart"	Williams	2:22
14.	"(I Heard That) Lonesome Whistle"	Williams, Jimmie Davis	2:26
15.	"Come In Stranger" (Early Version)		2:01
16.	"Wide Open Road" (Solo Demo Version)		1:49
17.	"I Love You Because" (with the Gene Lowery Singers)	Leon Payne	2:26
Total length:			36:41

== Charts ==
Singles - Billboard (North America)

Year	Single	Chart	Position
1959	"Straight A's in Love"	Country Singles	16
1959	"Straight A's in Love"	Pop Singles	84
1959	"I Love You Because"	Country Singles	20
1960	"Give My Love to Rose"	Country Singles	13
1960	"Come In Stranger"	Country Singles	6
1960	"Come In Stranger"	Pop Singles	66
1960	"Mean Eyed Cat"	Country Singles	30
