= Come In, Stranger =

Come In, Stranger may refer to:

- "Come In, Stranger" (song), a 1958 Johnny Cash song
- "Come In, Stranger" (Desperate Housewives), an episode of the television series Desperate Housewives
