= Slow Rider =

Slow Rider may refer to:

- "Slow Rider", a song by Johnny Cash on his 1960 album Sings Hank Williams
- "Slow Rider", a song by Julian Cope on his 1992 album Jehovahkill
