= Original Sun Sound of Johnny Cash =

Compilation album by Johnny Cash
- Released: November 23 1964
- Recorded: 1955–1958
- Genres: Rockabilly; country
- Length: Normal:: 27:06; Bonus: 41:13
- Label: Sun
- Producer: Sam Phillips

Johnny Cash chronology
Bitter Tears: Ballads of the American Indian (1964)	Original Sun Sound of Johnny Cash (1964)	Orange Blossom Special (1964)

Singles from Original Sun Sound of Johnny Cash
- 1. "Wide Open Road" Released: May 1, 1964

Professional ratings
Review scores
Source	Rating
Allmusic	3.5/5 stars

Original Sun Sound of Johnny Cash is a compilation album by American singer-songwriter Johnny Cash. The record was released in 1964 by Sun Records after Cash had left the label and signed with Columbia Records. The album is made up of songs Cash recorded for Sun prior to leaving the label: The album was re-issued in 2003 with 5 bonus tracks. These tracks are alternate or incomplete takes of songs that were already on the album.

== Track listing ==
Side one
No.	Title	Writer(s)	Length
1.	"Always Alone"	Ted Daffan	1:52
2.	"Country Boy"	Johnny Cash	1:53
3.	"Goodnight Irene"	Lead Belly, John A Lomax	2:42
4.	"Wide Open Road"	Cash	2:36
5.	"Thanks a Lot"	Charlie Rich	2:39
6.	"Big River"	Cash	2:33

Side two
No.	Title	Writer(s)	Length
7.	"Belshazzar"	Cash	2:26
8.	"Born to Lose"	Frankie Brown, Daffan	2:12
9.	"New Mexico"	Johnny Johnson, Leon Lambson	2:06
10.	"I Forgot to Remember to Forget"	Charlie Feathers, Stan Kesler	1:55
11.	"Two Timin' Woman"	Cash, Ron Hacker	1:58
12.	"Story of a Broken Heart"	Sam Phillips	2:14

Bonus tracks
No.	Title	Writer(s)	Length
13.	"Wide Open Road" (Undubbed Master)	Cash	2:30
14.	"Big River" (Alternate Take)	Cash	3:16
15.	"Born to Lose" (Undubbed Master)	Brown, Daffan	2:09
16.	"Story of a Broken Heart" (Alternate Take)	Phillips	2:33
17.	"Get Rhythm" (Alternate Take)	Cash	2:15
18.	"One More Ride" (Incomplete Take)	Bob Nolan	1:24
Total length:			41:13
