= Wide Open Road (Johnny Cash song) =

Single by Johnny Cash

from the album Original Sun Sound of Johnny Cash
- B-side: "Belshazzar"
- Released: 1964
- Recorded: 1955
- Genre: Country; blues
- Length: 2:33
- Label: Sun

Audio
- "Wide Open Road" on YouTube

"Wide Open Road" is a song written by Johnny Cash. It became the first song he recorded for Sun Records.

Recorded by Cash in early 1955, it wasn't released as a single until 1964, years after his move to Columbia. (That year Sun included the unpublished songs "Belshazzar" and "Wide Open Road" on the album Original Sun Sound of Johnny Cash and also released them as two sides of the only single from the album.)

== Composition ==
Cash wrote this song while serving in the U.S. Army in Germany.

It is a song about a lovers' quarrel. It is one of those songs in which Cash "chases his roaming [woman] of waits for [her] to return, all while feeling a sense of dislocation and identity trouble because of the woman's departure". Other examples include "Big River", "So Doggone Lonesome", "Port of Lonely Hearts", "Don't Make Me Go", "Next in Line", "There You Go", "Two-Timing Woman".

John M. Alexander writes in his book The Man in Song: A Discographic Biography of Johnny Cash,

"Wide Open Road” [is] a breezy kiss-off to a girl who says she's had enough, and the singer's response is to tell her to just leave and head down that wide open road. Right away Cash invokes a carefree persona who refuses to be a victim. However, he does eventually regret the decision and tries to win her back by searching for her in order to tell her that things have gone crazy for him since she left. The road then becomes a means for her to find her way back home. The theme of second thoughts and regrets due to rash judgment would reemerge in many Cash songs through the years.

According to AllMusic, this early song "shows the singer still under influence of Hank Williams". It is also "a rarity in featuring the steel guitar of A.W. 'Red' Kernodle, who left the group [The Tennessee Three] shortly afterwards."

Cash recollected:

I was really nervous in the studio [...], and the steel guitar player, Red Kernodle, another mechanic at the Automobile Sales Company, was even worse; he was so jittery he could hardly play at all. The results were predictable: the first track we recorded, "Wide Open Road," sounded awful, and it didn't get any better. After three or four songs, Red packed up his steel and left. "This music business is not for me," he said, and I didn't contest the point. After that we settled down a little and managed to get a respectable take on "Hey, Porter.

== Track listing ==
The opposite side of the single is another song written by Cash himself, "Belshazah". As AllMusic states, that gospel song was "an unusual inclusion in that [Cash's] producer, Sam Phillips, usually recorded only the performer's secular material."

7" single (Sun 392, 1964)

1. "Wide Open Road" (2:30)
2. "Belshazah" (2:21)

* Billboard advertisements list "Belshazah" as the main side and "Wide Open Road" as the flip.

== Covers ==
The song has been covered by a number of artists including The Little Willies.
