= What Do I Care =

Single by Johnny Cash

from the album Ring of Fire: The Best of Johnny Cash
- A-side: "What Do I Care" "All Over Again"
- Released: Autumn 1958
- Genre: country
- Label: Columbia 4-41251
- Songwriter: Johnny Cash

Music video
- "What Do I Care" (audio only) on YouTube

"What Do I Care" is a song written and originally recorded by Johnny Cash.

It was issued on his first Columbia Records single (Columbia 4-41251, with "All Over Again" on the opposite side), released between September and November 1958.

"What Do I Care" reached #52 on the Billboard Hot 100 and #7 on the Billboard country chart, while "All Over Again" made it to #38 and #4, respectively.

== Background ==
"What Do I Care" represents a strong piece of philosophical wisdom from Cash. "What do I care if I never have much money, and sometimes my table looks a little bare / Anything that I may miss is made up for each time we kiss, you love me and I love you so what do I care." It's an inspired ballad and Johnny's future protégés the Statler Brothers would record a fine version of the song for their 1974 Mercury Records album Carry Me Back.

— John M. Alexander. The Man in Song: A Discographic Biography of Johnny Cash

== Charts ==
Chart (1958)	Peak position
US Hot Country Songs (Billboard)	7
US Billboard Hot 100	52
