= The Fabulous Johnny Cash =

Studio album by Johnny Cash
- Released: November 3, 1958
- Recorded: July 24–August 13, 1958
- Studios: Bradley (Nashville, Tennessee)
- Genre: Country
- Length: 28:28
- Label: Columbia
- Producer: Don Law

Johnny Cash chronology
Johnny Cash with His Hot and Blue Guitar! (1957)	The Fabulous Johnny Cash (1958)	Johnny Cash Sings the Songs That Made Him Famous (1958)

Singles from The Fabulous Johnny Cash
- 1. "Don't Take Your Guns to Town" Released: December 22, 1958; 2. "Frankie's Man, Johnny" Released: March 30, 1959

Professional ratings
Review scores
Source	Rating
AllMusic	link
Classic Rock	favorable
PopMatters	favorable
(The New) Rolling Stone Album Guide	4/5 stars

The Fabulous Johnny Cash is the second studio album by American country singer Johnny Cash and his first to be released by Columbia Records. The album was released on November 3, 1958, not long after Cash's departure from Sun Records.

== Content ==
The album features five tracks written by Cash and backing vocal performances by the Jordanaires (who at this time were also regulars on Elvis Presley's recording sessions for RCA Records). Overall, even though the album is only 29 minutes in length, it is considered one of Cash's most cohesive pieces. This is largely because his sessions with Columbia were completed over a two-month period. That is greatly reduced when compared to the year by year sessions by Sun Records.

== Commercial performance ==
The Fabulous Johnny Cash was a successful debut on Columbia for Cash as it sold over half a million copies during its initial release. Although Billboard did not publish a chart for country albums in 1958, the album peaked at No. 19 on the Billboard Best Selling LP's chart.

== Reissues ==
The album was reissued in 2002 by Sony Music's Legacy imprint. The re-issue contains six bonus tracks and unedited versions of the songs. Legacy reissued the album on 180-gram vinyl for Record Store Day on November 23, 2012.

== Track listing ==
Side one
No.	Title	Writer(s)	Recording date	Length
1.	"Run Softly, Blue River"	John R. Cash	August 8, 1958	2:22
2.	"Frankie's Man, Johnny"	J. R. Cash	August 8, 1958	2:15
3.	"That's All Over"	Dick Glasser	August 8, 1958	1:52
4.	"The Troubadour"	Cindy Walker	August 8, 1958	2:15
5.	"One More Ride"	Bob Nolan	August 13, 1958	1:59
6.	"That's Enough"	Dorothy Coates	August 13, 1958	2:41

Side two
No.	Title	Writer(s)	Recording date	Length
1.	"I Still Miss Someone"	J. R. Cash; Roy Cash	August 13, 1958	2:34
2.	"Don't Take Your Guns to Town"	J. R. Cash	August 13, 1958	3:03
3.	"I'd Rather Die Young"	Beasley Smith; Billy Vaughn; Randy Wood	August 13, 1958	2:29
4.	"Pickin' Time"	J. R. Cash	August 13, 1958	1:58
5.	"Shepherd of My Heart"	Jenny Lou Carson	August 13, 1958	2:10
6.	"Suppertime"	Ira Stanphill	July 24, 1958	2:50

2002 reissue bonus tracks
No.	Title	Writer(s)	Recording date	Length
13.	"Oh, What a Dream" (Take 1)	J. R. Cash	July 24, 1958	2:08
14.	"Mama's Baby"	J. R. Cash	August 8, 1958	2:22
15.	"Fool's Hall of Fame"	Jerry Freeman; Danny Wolfe	August 8, 1958	2:10
16.	"I'll Remember You"	J. R. Cash	July 24, 1958	2:07
17.	"Cold Shoulder"	Helene Hudgins	August 13, 1958	1:55
18.	"Walking the Blues"	J. R. Cash; Robert Lunn	August 13, 1958	2:12

== Personnel ==
Musicians

- Johnny Cash - lead vocals, acoustic rhythm guitar
- The Jordanaires - background vocals
- Luther Perkins - lead guitar
- Marshall Grant - bass
- Marvin Hughes - piano
- Morris Palmer - drums
- Buddy Harman - drums on "Suppertime" and 2002 bonus tracks "Oh, What a Dream" and "I'll Remember You"
- Don Helms - steel guitar

Additional personnel

- Al Quaglieri - Producer
- Don Law - Producer
- Billy Altman - Liner Notes
- Don Hunstein - Photography
- Seth Foster - Mastering
- Mark Wilder - Mastering, Mixing
- Hal Adams - Cover Photo
- Stacey Boyle - Tape Research
- Kay Smith - Tape Research
- Matt Kelly - Tape Research
- Geoff Gillette - Sleeve Design
- Steven Berkowitz - A&R
- Darren Salmieri - A&R
- Patti Matheny - A&R
- Howard Fritzson - Art Direction
- Nick Shaffran - Series Consultant

== Charts ==
Album - Billboard (United States)

Chart (1958)	Peak position
Best Selling LP's	19

Singles - Billboard (United States)

Year	Single	Chart	Position
1959	"Don't Take Your Guns to Town"	Country Singles	1
1959	"Don't Take Your Guns to Town"	Pop Singles	32
1959	"Frankie's Man, Johnny"	Country Singles	9
1959	"Frankie's Man, Johnny"	Pop Singles	57
