= I Love You Because (song) =

Original song written and composed by Leon Payne

Single by Leon Payne
- B-side: "A Link in the Chain of Broken Hearts"
- Released: October 1949
- Recorded: 1949
- Genre: Country
- Length: 2:41
- Label: Capitol
- Songwriter: Leon Payne

Leon Payne singles chronology
"Baby Boy" (1948)	"I Love You Because" (1949)	"My Daddy" (1951)

"I Love You Because" is a song written and recorded by country music singer-songwriter Leon Payne in 1949. It has been covered by several artists throughout the years, including hit cover versions by Al Martino in 1963 and Jim Reeves in 1964.

== Leon Payne version ==
In 1949, Leon Payne's original version went to number 4 on the Billboard Country & Western Best Seller lists and spent two weeks at number 1 on the Country & Western Disk Jockey List, spending a total of thirty-two weeks on the chart. "I Love You Because" was Payne's only song to make the country charts.

== Elvis Presley version ==
"I Love You Because"

Single by Elvis Presley

from the album Elvis Presley
- A-side: "Tryin' to Get to You"
- Released: March 23, 1956
- Recorded: July 4–5, 1954
- Label: RCA Victir
- Songwriter: Leon Payne
- Producer: Sam Phillips

"I Love You Because" was recorded by Elvis Presley in 1954, at SUN Studio, Memphis, Tennessee. The session started on July 4 and ended early on the morning of July 5, the day that he recorded "That's All Right". Producer Sam Phillips did not think "I Love You Because" was the right song for Elvis's first single, so it was instead used as the B-side of "Tryin' to Get to You", both of which can be found on his 1956 debut album Elvis Presley.

== Johnny Cash version ==
"I Love You Because"

Single by Johnny Cash

from the album Sings Hank Williams
- B-side: "Straight A's in Love"
- Released: December 1959
- Genre: Country
- Length: 2:40
- Label: Sun 334

Music video
- "I Love You Because" (audio only) on YouTube

The song was also notably covered by Johnny Cash. His version was released by Sun Records as a single (Sun 334, with "Straight A's in Love" on the opposite side) in December 1959, when Cash had already left the label for Columbia.

=== Charts ===
Chart (1960)	Peak position
US Hot Country Songs (Billboard)	20

== Al Martino version ==
"I Love You Because"

Single by Al Martino

from the album I Love You Because
- B-side: "Merry-Go-Round"
- Released: April 1963
- Genre: Easy listening
- Length: 2:40
- Label: Capitol
- Songwriter: Leon Payne
- Producer: Voyle Gilmore

Al Martino singles chronology
"Because You're Mine" (1962)	"I Love You Because" (1963)	"Painted, Tainted Rose" (1963)

In 1963, Al Martino recorded the most successful version of the song, which peaked at number 3 on the US Billboard Hot 100 chart and number 1 on the Middle-Road (Adult Contemporary) chart for two weeks in May that year.

== Jim Reeves version ==
In 1963, American country singer Jim Reeves recorded the song for his album Gentleman Jim. Released as a single in 1964, it peaked at number 5 in the UK and became his most successful single in Norway, topping the VG-Lista chart for 13 weeks. In 1976, the song was the title track of a posthumous Jim Reeves album that peaked at number 24 on the US Country LP chart. Released as a single, it reached number 54 in the US Billboard Country singles chart in that year.

=== Charts ===
Chart (1964)	Peak position
Norway Singles Chart	1
Irish Singles Chart	1
Dutch Singles Chart	9
UK Singles Chart (Official Charts Company)	5
US Billboard Hot Country Songs	54

=== Sales ===
Region	Certification	Certified units/sales
Norway	—	100,000

== Other versions ==
- In 1950, Ernest Tubb and Clyde Moody each recorded their own version, both making the top 10 on the Country & Western charts.
- Carl Smith recorded it for his album I Love You Because (1969). The song peaked at number 14 on the US Billboard Hot Country Songs chart in 1969.
- In 1983, Roger Whittaker's rendition peaked at number 91 on the Hot Country Singles chart.

== See also ==
- List of number-one adult contemporary singles of 1963 (U.S.)
