= All Over Again (Johnny Cash song) =

Single by Johnny Cash
- A-side: "All Over Again" "What Do I Care"
- Released: Autumn 1958
- Genre: Country
- Label: Columbia 4-41251
- Songwriter: Johnny Cash

Johnny Cash singles chronology
"The Ways of a Woman in Love" (1958)	"All Over Again" (1958)	"It's Just About Time" (1958)

Music video
- "All Over Again" (audio only) on YouTube

"All Over Again" is a song written and originally recorded by Johnny Cash. He recorded it for his first single on Columbia Records.

The single (Columbia 4-41251, with "What Do I Care" on the opposite side) was released between September and November 1958.

"All Over Again" reached #38 on the Billboard Hot 100 and #4 on the Billboard country chart, while "What Do I Care" made it to #52 and #7, respectively.

== Background ==
For his first Columbia single, Cash wrote and recorded the song "All Over Again," a song of love and devotion with the singer proclaiming, "Every time I look at you I fall in love all over again." It was the perfect transition single, sounding as if it might have been a Sun release, and yet there was something very fresh and new about it. [...]

— John M. Alexander. The Man in Song: A Discographic Biography of Johnny Cash

John M. Alexander notes in his book The Man in Song: A Discographic Biography of Johnny Cash that Cash "favored the single's B-side, 'What Do I Care.'

The song wasn't included on any studio album, but "and yet Cash never forgot about it".

== Charts ==
Chart (1958)	Peak position
US Hot Country Songs (Billboard)	4
US Billboard Hot 100	38
