= Straight A's in Love =

Single by Johnny Cash and the Tennessee Two

from the album Johnny Cash Sings Hank Williams
- A-side: "Straight A's in Love" "I Love You Because"
- Released: December 1959
- Genre: Rockabilly; rock and roll
- Label: Sun 334
- Songwriter: Johnny Cash

Johnny Cash and the Tennessee Two singles chronology
"Little Drummer Boy" (1959)	"Straight A's in Love" (1959)	"Smiling Bill McCall" (1960)

Audio
- "Straight A's in Love" on YouTube

"Straight A's in Love" is a song written and originally recorded by Johnny Cash.

The song was released by Sun Records as a single (Sun 334, with "I Love You Because" on the opposite side) in December 1959, when Cash had already left the label for Columbia.

== Charts ==
Chart (1960)	Peak position
US Billboard Hot 100	84
US Hot Country Songs (Billboard)	16
