= Don't Take Your Guns to Town =

Single by Johnny Cash

from the album The Fabulous Johnny Cash
- B-side: "I Still Miss Someone"
- Released: December 1958
- Recorded: 1958
- Genre: Western; country folk
- Length: 3:03
- Label: Columbia
- Songwriter: Johnny Cash
- Producer: Don Law

Johnny Cash singles chronology
"It's Just About Time" (1958)	"Don't Take Your Guns to Town" (1958)	"Luther Played the Boogie" (1959)

"Don't Take Your Guns to Town" is a song written and recorded by American singer Johnny Cash. It was released in December 1958 as the first single from the album The Fabulous Johnny Cash.

== Content ==
The song tells the story of Billy Joe, a young cowboy yearning for freedom and independence. One day, armed with his guns, Billy Joe decides to take a trip to find himself, despite his mother's constant pleas not to take his guns with him. He arrives in a cattle town and visits a local saloon. He samples some strong liquor to try to prove to himself that he has become the man he always wanted to be.

A bully cowboy is seated at the bar next to Billy Joe, and begins to laugh and make fun of him. Angered by the cowboy's taunting, Billy Joe reaches for one of his guns to draw on the bully. However, with his marksmanship experience, the bully cowboy shoots Billy Joe before he could even take aim. All the other patrons gather around Billy Joe as he collapses to his death from the gunshot wound, confused when he repeats the words his mother told him before he left: "Don't take your guns to town."

== Chart performance ==
The single was his fifth release to reach #1 on the country chart, where it stayed for six weeks. The song was also a crossover hit peaking at #32 on the pop chart.

Chart (1958–1959)	Peak position
US Hot Country Songs (Billboard)	1
US Billboard Hot 100	32

== Rerecordings and covers ==
=== Rerecordings ===
As was the case with many of his hits, Cash re-recorded the song on several occasions. In 1974, he recorded it in a more modern arrangement for the album The Junkie and the Juicehead Minus Me which also updated some of the lyrics. A more straight remake was recorded for the 1988 album Classic Cash: Hall of Fame Series. He also recorded a live version with Willie Nelson for the 1998 release VH1 Storytellers: Johnny Cash & Willie Nelson.

=== Covers ===
- U2 would release the track on the 2020 album All That You Can't Leave Behind (20th Anniversary Super Deluxe Edition).
- Charley Crockett covered the song on his 2026 album Clovis.

== Alternate version ==
During a 1991 guest appearance on the children's program Sesame Street, Cash performed a version of this song with new child-friendly lyrics titled "Don't Take Your Ones to Town".

== Legacy ==
- Members of the Western Writers of America chose it as one of the Top 100 Western songs of all time.
