= I Couldn't Keep from Crying =

Single by Marty Robbins
- B-side: "After You Leave"
- Released: February 20, 1953
- Genre: Country
- Length: 2:45
- Label: Columbia 21075
- Songwriter: Marty Robbins

Marty Robbins singles chronology
"I'll Go On Alone" (1952)	"I Couldn't Keep from Crying" (1953)	"A Castle in the Sky" (1953)

"I Couldn't Keep from Crying" is a song written and recorded by American country music artist Marty Robbins. Performers on the song include Slim Harbert on bass, Johnny Gimble on fiddle, Jimmy Rollins and Joe Knight on guitar, and Harold Carmack on piano.

== Chart performance ==
The song reached number 5 on the US Billboard country chart in 1953.

== Other versions ==
- Johnny Cash released a version as part of an EP in 1960. It is featured on his 1960 album, Now, There Was a Song!
