= Give My Love to Rose =

1957 song by Johnny Cash

"Give My Love to Rose" is a country song by Johnny Cash, recorded at Sun Records in 1957. Cash sang and played it with the Tennessee Two, with Sam Phillips producing. It was released in August 1957 as the B-side of the single "Home of the Blues" (Sun 279), which reached No. 5 in the Country & Western Chart. "Give My Love To Rose" reached No. 13 in the same chart.

Cash subsequently re-recorded the song. A version in 2002 brought him his fourth and final Grammy Award for Best Male Country Vocal Performance.

== Background ==
Cash recorded the genesis of the song as a conversation he had with an inmate from San Quentin State Prison. The prisoner asked Cash to convey a message to his wife. The song details the experience of a released convict, travelling to Louisiana from San Francisco to see his family. Terminally ill, he collapses along the rails of the railway and, while dying, asks the song's narrator to carry a message to his wife and son.

Cash recorded the song in his usual manner, playing the rhythm guitar himself, with Luther Perkins and Marshall Grant on the lead guitar and bass respectively. The song was the last one which Sam Phillips produced, being succeeded by "Cowboy" Jack Clement.

== Releases ==
Cash recorded the song several times over the course of his career. It appears on the 1960 album Johnny Cash Sings Hank Williams, even though the song is not one of Williams'. It also appears on the album All Aboard the Blue Train with Johnny Cash, released in 1962.

He also included the song on the following albums:

- I Walk the Line (1964)
- At Folsom Prison (1968)
- American IV: The Man Comes Around (2002)

In April 1999 Bruce Springsteen played a solo acoustic version of the song, for the television show An All Star Tribute to Johnny Cash. Springsteen rated the song as one of his favorite Cash songs.
