= You're the Nearest Thing to Heaven =

Single by Johnny Cash and the Tennessee Two
- A-side: "The Ways of a Woman in Love"
- Released: August 1958
- Genre: Country
- Label: Sun 302
- Songwriters: Hoyt Johnson, Jim Atkins, Johnny Cash

Music video
- "You're the Nearest Thing to Heaven" (audio only) on YouTube

"You're the Nearest Thing to Heaven" is a song co-written and originally recorded by Johnny Cash.

The song was released as a single (Sun 302 with "The Ways of a Woman in Love" on the opposite side) in August 1958.

== Background ==
"You're the Nearest Thing to Heaven" has a hauntingly beautiful lyric with distinct poetic overtones and was written by Cash, Hoyt Johnson, and Jimmy Atkins. The singer relates all the wondrous things he's seen in God's creation, but his sweetheart is the “nearest thing to heaven on this earth.” While Cash had arranged and adapted songs at Sun, this was a rare cowrite, and only one of four he would cowrite while at Sun. Through the years Johnny would collaborate on songs with other writers, but this was, arguably, one of his finest. It was issued as the B-side of “The Ways of a Woman in Love” in 1958 and reached number 5 on the country chart.

— John M. Alexander. The Man in Song: A Discographic Biography of Johnny Cash

== Charts ==
Chart (1958)	Peak position
US Hot Country Songs (Billboard)	5
