= Train of Love =

Single by Johnny Cash and Tennessee Two
- A-side: "Train of Love" "There You Go"
- Released: November 1956
- Genre: Country, rockabilly
- Label: Sun 258
- Songwriter: Johnny Cash

Audio
- "Train of Love" on YouTube

"Train of Love" is a song written and originally recorded by Johnny Cash.

The song was recorded by Cash in April 1956 and released as a single on Sun Records (Sun 258) in late 1956, with "There You Go" on the opposite side. The single reached #1 on Billboard's Most Played C&W in Juke Boxes chart
