= Don't Make Me Go =

Single by Johnny Cash and Tennessee Two

from the album Johnny Cash Sings the Songs That Made Him Famous
- A-side: "Don't Make Me Go" "Next in Line"
- Released: 1957
- Genre: Country
- Label: Sun 266
- Songwriter: Johnny Cash

"Don't Make Me Go" is a song written and originally recorded by Johnny Cash.

The song was recorded by Cash in April 1957 and released as a single on Sun Records (Sun 266) later in the year, with "Next in Line" (another song from the same recording session) on the opposite side. The single reached #9 on the Billboard C&W Best Sellers in Stores chart.

== Composition ==
It is a melancholy love song, as is the song it was coupled with on the single.
