= I Still Miss Someone =

Single by Johnny Cash

from the album The Fabulous Johnny Cash
- A-side: "Don't Take Your Guns to Town"
- Recorded: July 24, 1958
- Genre: Country
- Length: 2:34
- Label: Columbia
- Songwriters: Johnny Cash; Roy Cash, Jr.
- Producer: Don Law

"I Still Miss Someone" is a song co-written by Johnny Cash and his nephew Roy Cash, Jr. and originally recorded by American country music singer Johnny Cash. He first recorded it in 1958 as the B-side to "Don't Take Your Guns to Town".

== History ==
Cash wrote "I Still Miss Someone" with his nephew, Roy Cash, Jr. He performed "I Still Miss Someone" during At Folsom Prison, and most of Cash's live recordings after the 1960s also included this song. He also re-recorded it in the studio on several later occasions for Columbia and Mercury Records.

Cash appeared in Eat the Document, which documented Bob Dylan's 1966 world tour, performing "I Still Miss Someone" with Dylan backstage. Cash later recorded the song as a duet with Dylan during sessions for Dylan's album Nashville Skyline in 1969; this duet was officially released in 2019 on The Bootleg Series Vol. 15: Travelin' Thru, 1967–1969.

The Statler Brothers recorded the song on their 1966 Flowers on the Wall album.

Cash and Willie Nelson performed the song as a duet during concerts by their supergroup The Highwaymen, which also featured Waylon Jennings and Kris Kristofferson. A 1990 live Highwaymen version was released on the album Live: American Outlaws in 2016.

== Cover versions ==
Four different artists have charted versions of "I Still Miss Someone" on the Billboard charts. Flatt & Scruggs released a version on the album The Versatile Flatt & Scruggs, peaking at #45 in 1965. In 1981, Don King took a version to #38, on his Epic Records album Whirlwind. Emmylou Harris sent her version to #51, releasing it as the third and final single from her 1989 album Bluebird. In 2004, Martina McBride recorded the song for her 2005 album Timeless as a duet with Dolly Parton. This rendition went to #50 in 2006. Stevie Nicks also covered the song on her 1989 album The Other Side of the Mirror as did Nanci Griffith on her 1998 album of songs by other songwriters, Other Voices, Too (A Trip Back to Bountiful).

Jimmy Buffett performed the song as a dedication to Cash at the White River Amphitheatre in Auburn, Washington, on September 16, 2003, four days after Cash's death. Before playing it, Buffett said it was his favorite Johnny Cash song. It's the only time Buffett ever performed the song, and the performance was recorded and released on the live album, Live in Auburn, WA. Gram Parsons and the International Submarine Band covered it on their only album, Safe at Home. Brenda Lee recorded a version as the B-side to her 1964 single "Truly, Truly True". Joan Baez recorded "I Still Miss Someone" on her 1964 album Joan Baez/5.

The song was covered by Linda Ronstadt on her self-titled 1971 album on Capitol Records. It was covered by Leo Kottke on his 1991 album, Great Big Boy on Private Music. Troy Cassar-Daley covered the song on his album Borrowed & Blue in 2004. The British folk-rock band Fairport Convention recorded it for a 1968 BBC radio session; this version was released on their album, Heyday: the BBC Radio Sessions 1968–69.

John Doe and the Sadies gave the song a cover on Country Club, a 2009 album of country classics on Yep Roc Records.

Robert Earl Keen recorded the song for his Live from Austin, TX CD on August 22, 2001. The album was released by New West Records, on November 2, 2004.

Suzy Bogguss covered it with Chet Atkins in their 1994 album, Simpatico.

Crystal Gayle covered it on her 1978 album, When I Dream.
