= Guess Things Happen That Way =

Single by Johnny Cash and the Tennessee Two

from the album Sings the Songs That Made Him Famous
- B-side: "Come In, Stranger"
- Released: May 19, 1957
- Genre: Rock and roll
- Length: 1:52
- Label: Sun
- Songwriter: Jack Clement
- Producers: Sam Phillips; Jack Clement

Johnny Cash and the Tennessee Two singles chronology
"Big River" (1958)	"Guess Things Happen That Way" (1957)	"The Ways of a Woman in Love" (1958)

"Guess Things Happen That Way" is a 1958 cross over single by Johnny Cash, which was written by Jack Clement. The single was Johnny Cash's fourth #1 on the country chart spending eight weeks at #1, and a total of 24 weeks on the chart.

The B-side of "Guess Things Happen That Way", a song entitled, "Come In Stranger" made it to #6 on the country chart. The single also crossed over to the pop chart, peaking at #66. The song was also featured in the 1993 film A Perfect World directed by Clint Eastwood and was put on the film's soundtrack.

== Content ==
The song is about a man struggling after the love of his life has died.

== Critical reception ==
As Allmusic describes it, the song "featured an arrangement dominated by piano and a vocal chorus adding distinctive 'ba-doo's throughout [that is] ...slicker than, say, "Cry! Cry! Cry!" or "I Walk the Line" [but with] an eccentric tone all its own — largely because the vocal chorus (who sound as if they're occupying a middle ground between doo wop and barbershop quartet) is in such stark contrast to Cash's lead vocal."

The song was banned by the BBC upon its 1958 release when the head of religious broadcasting objected to the lines "God gave me that girl to lean on, / Then he put me on my own. / Heaven help me be a man / And have the strength to stand alone."

== Chart performance ==
Chart (1958)	Peak position
US Hot Country Songs (Billboard)	1
US Billboard Hot 100	11

== In popular culture ==
- On February 25, 2010, the song, purchased by grandfather and Woodstock, Georgia native Louie Sulcer, became the 10 billionth download through the Apple iTunes Store.
