= Ballad of a Teenage Queen =

Single by Johnny Cash

from the album Sings the Songs That Made Him Famous
- A-side: "Ballad of a Teenage Queen"; Big River
- Released: January 6, 1958
- Recorded: November 12 and 22, 1957
- Genre: Country; rock and roll; rockabilly
- Length: 2:13
- Label: Sun
- Songwriter: Jack Clement
- Producers: Sam Phillips, Jack Clement

Johnny Cash singles chronology
"Home of the Blues" (1957)	"Ballad of a Teenage Queen" (1958)	"Big River" (1957)

"Ballad of a Teenage Queen" is a country and rockabilly song written by Jack Clement and recorded by Johnny Cash, with background music by The Tennessee Two. Recorded for his 1958 album Sings the Songs That Made Him Famous, it hit number 1 on the US Country charts and number 14 on the Billboard Hot 100.

== Content ==
The song tells the story of a small-town teenage girl with golden hair and blue eyes who is considered the prettiest the townsfolk have ever seen. She is so pretty that all the boys want to have her. But the girl prefers and loves the boy next door, who is employed at the local candy store.

The boy saves enough money to buy a ring and plans to marry her "next spring", but suddenly, a movie scout from Hollywood comes to take her away. Mesmerized by what Hollywood has to offer, she leaves the boy and her hometown and heads to the big city.

Very soon, the girl becomes famous and enjoys the big-city pleasures like a fancy house and a swimming pool. However, she begins to miss "her old hometown" and the boy who still works at the candy store, and becomes very unhappy. One day, the girl gives up all that she had, including her fame, and takes a train ride back to her hometown, and finally comes back to the boy from the candy store, whom she still loves.

== Chart positions ==
Chart (1958)	Peak position
US Hot Country Songs (Billboard)	1
US Billboard Hot 100	14

== Re-recording ==
During his brief stint with Mercury Records, Cash re-recorded the song in 1987 featuring guest vocals by his daughter, Rosanne Cash, and the Everly Brothers. This version was first released on the 1988 duets album Water from the Wells of Home, and is one of only a handful of recordings of Cash performing with his daughter to be released. It received a nomination for Vocal Event of the Year at the 1989 Country Music Association Awards.

Chart (1989)	Peak position
US Hot Country Songs (Billboard)	45
