= The Ways of a Woman in Love =

Single by Johnny Cash and the Tennessee Two
- A-side: "You're the Nearest Thing to Heaven"
- Released: August 1958
- Genre: Country, rockabilly, rock and roll
- Label: Sun 302
- Songwriters: Bill Justis, Charlie Rich

Johnny Cash and the Tennessee Two singles chronology
"Guess Things Happen That Way" (1958)	"The Ways of a Woman in Love" (1958)	"All Over Again" (1958)

Music video
- "The Ways of a Woman in Love" (audio only) on YouTube

"The Ways of a Woman in Love" is a song originally recorded by Johnny Cash. It was written for him by Bill Justis and Charlie Rich.

The song was recorded by Cash in July 1958 during his final sessions for Sun Records. and released as a single (Sun 302, with "You're the Nearest Thing to Heaven" on the opposite side) in August.

The song was also recorded and released by Charlie Rich as a single in 1973 and in the following year enjoyed b-side success of backing Billy Swan's International Bestseller "I Can Help." In 2018, critically acclaimed songwriter John Prine pronounced that "The Ways of a Woman in Love" was his favorite Johnny Cash song and released a music video of it.

== Composition ==
Cash scored his last big Sun hit with "The Ways of a Woman in Love," a Charlie Rich and Bill Justis cowrite about a man who senses his woman is falling in love with another man. She's changing her ways, and it's killing the singer. He can't stop thinking about her and wishing he was the other guy. This fine ballad made it to number 2 on the country chart and number 24 pop.

— John M. Alexander. The Man in Song: A Discographic Biography of Johnny Cash

The next single Cash released was on his new label, Columbia.

== Charts ==
Chart (1958)	Peak position
US Billboard Hot 100	24
US Hot Country Songs (Billboard)	3
