= Home of the Blues =

Single by Johnny Cash

from the album Sings the Songs That Made Him Famous
- B-side: "Give My Love to Rose"
- Released: August 10, 1957
- Recorded: July 1, 1957
- Genre: Country; rockabilly
- Length: 2:41
- Label: Sun
- Songwriters: Johnny Cash; Lillie McAlpin; Glenn Douglas Tubb
- Producer: Jack Clement

Johnny Cash singles chronology
"Next in Line" (1957)	"Home of the Blues" (1957)	"Ballad of a Teenage Queen" (1958)

Audio
- "Home of the Blues" on YouTube

"Home of the Blues" is a song co-written and recorded by American country music artist Johnny Cash. The song was recorded on July 1, 1957, in Memphis, Tennessee, and was released as a single in August the same year. It was also included as the eleventh track of his second album, Sings the Songs That Made Him Famous.

The song was written by Johnny Cash, Lillie McAlpin and Glenn Douglas Tubb and produced by Jack Clement. Partial ownership of the song is held by Florida businessman John Palumbo.

Cover versions of the song were recorded by Dwight Yoakam in 1988, by Laughing Hyenas in 1995 and by Owl City in early 2012. The song was also recorded by Joaquin Phoenix for the 2005 film Walk the Line.

== Content ==
The song is an autobiographical account of Cash's unpleasant childhood. Cash has attributed his inspiration for this song as Home of the Blues record shop on Beale Street in Memphis, Tennessee, which operated from the late 1940s until the mid-1970s. He used to hang out there, buy records and meet other musicians including the owner Ruben Cherry.

== Chart positions ==
Chart (1957)	Peak position
US Billboard Hot Country Singles	3
US Billboard Hot 100	88
