= Big River (Johnny Cash song) =

Single by Johnny Cash

from the album Sings the Songs That Made Him Famous
- A-side: "Ballad of a Teenage Queen"
- Released: March 1958
- Genre: Rockabilly
- Length: 2:35
- Label: Sun
- Songwriter: Johnny Cash
- Producers: Sam Phillips, Jack Clement

Johnny Cash singles chronology
"Ballad of a Teenage Queen" (1958)	"Big River" (1958)	"Guess Things Happen That Way" (1958)

"Big River" is a song written and originally recorded by Johnny Cash. Released as a single by Sun Records in 1958, it went as high as #4 on the Billboard country music charts and stayed on the charts for 14 weeks. The song tells a story of the chase of a lost love along the course of Mississippi River from Saint Paul, Minnesota to New Orleans, Louisiana. In June 2026, CBS News included the song in its list of the 250 essential American songs of the past 250 years.

== Background ==
A verse omitted from the original recording was later performed during Johnny Cash's live performances. A demo recording from the Sun sessions featuring the omitted verse also exists and has been released on numerous Sun compilations.

== Chart performance ==
Chart (1958)	Peak position
U.S. Billboard Hot Country Singles	4
U.S. Billboard Hot 100	14

== Cover versions ==
- Ian Tyson (of Ian and Sylvia) included a spirited version of Big River on the duo's Lovin' Sound album released in 1967, with David Rae on lead guitar.
- The Grateful Dead played a cover version of this song 396 times from 1965-1995. First appearing on their 1976 live album Steal Your Face, it features on many of their concert recordings, such as One from the Vault and Dick's Picks Volume 1.
- Colin Linden recorded a version included in the 2003 tribute album, Johnny's Blues: A Tribute To Johnny Cash (Northern Blues).
- Trick Pony recorded a version of Big River with Johnny Cash and Waylon Jennings on their debut album.
- Hank Williams Jr. covered this song on his 1970 album Singing My Songs - Johnny Cash, which contained exclusively covers of Johnny Cash songs.
- The Secret Sisters recorded a version of the song in 2011, with Jack White playing backing guitar.
- Bob Dylan and The Band recorded two takes of the song in 1967 during The Basement Tapes sessions. They were officially released on November 4, 2014, on The Bootleg Series Vol. 11: The Basement Tapes Complete.
- Bob Dylan and Johnny Cash also recorded a version of the song together at the 1969 Dylan-Cash sessions. This version was officially released on November 1, 2019, on The Bootleg Series Vol. 15: Travelin' Thru, 1967–1969.
- Johnny Cash was featured in a cover performed by The Highwaymen, a country supergroup featuring Cash, Willie Nelson, Waylon Jennings and Kris Kristofferson. This cover is slightly more upbeat, skewing to "Outlaw Country," and features the verse Cash omitted when he first recorded the song for Sun (Jennings sang the verse on the studio recording and in live performances, which allowed each member of the group to sing a verse).
- Tim Armstrong covered the song in 2012 during his Guitar Center session.
- Rosanne Cash recorded a cover of the song on her 1980 album Right or Wrong.
- Beat Farmers recorded a raucous cover of the song on their 1987 album The Pursuit of Happiness.
- Johnny Rivers on the album Memphis Sun Recordings.
- Gene Summers included the song on his "Country Song Roundup" album in 2018.
- Infamous Stringdusters recorded a cover of the song on their 2015 Undercover album.
- Tim Buckley recorded an extended-length improvisational cover in 1968 that appears on the 2-CD set "Live at The Electric Theater Co. Chicago, 1968".
- Bill Monroe performed a version that appears on the compilation album, Down for Double, released in November 2018.
- Lemmy performed a version appearing as the first track on The Head Cat album Lemmy, Slim Jim, & Danny B released in 2000.
- Boyd Holbrook recorded a cover of the song for the 2024 film, A Complete Unknown.
