= Next in Line (Johnny Cash song) =

Single by Johnny Cash and Tennessee Two
- A-side: "Next in Line" "Don't Make Me Go"
- Released: 1957
- Genre: Country
- Label: Sun 266
- Songwriter: Johnny Cash

Johnny Cash and Tennessee Two singles chronology
"There You Go" (1956)	"Next in Line" (1957)	"Home of the Blues" (1957)

Music video
- "Next in Line" (audio only) on YouTube

"Next in Line" is a song written and originally recorded by Johnny Cash.

The song was recorded by Cash in April 1957 and released as a single on Sun Records (Sun 266) later in the year, with "Don't Make Me Go" (another song from the same recording session) on the opposite side. The single reached #9 on the Billboard C&W Best Sellers in Stores chart. The song "Next in Line" (on its own) also reached #99 on the Top 100 and the top ten on the Most Played C&W by Jockeys chart.

== Composition ==
It is a melancholy love song, as is the song it was coupled with on the single.
