= Come In, Stranger (song) =

Single by Johnny Cash
- Released: 1958
- Genre: Rockabilly, rock and roll, country
- Length: 1:44
- Label: Sun (US), London (UK)
- Songwriter: Johnny Cash

"Come In, Stranger" is a 1958 Johnny Cash song. It was originally the B-side to "Guess Things Happen That Way", but the song gained greater popularity when Cash re-recorded it for the title track of an EP in 1971. The song was reissued again on Johnny Cash - The Essential Sun Singles.
