= There You Go (Johnny Cash song) =

Single by Johnny Cash and Tennessee Two
- A-side: "There You Go" "Train of Love"
- Released: November 1956
- Genre: Country; rockabilly
- Label: Sun 258
- Songwriter: Johnny Cash

Johnny Cash and Tennessee Two singles chronology
"I Walk the Line" (1956)	"There You Go" (1956)	"Next in Line" (1957)

Audio
- "There You Go" on YouTube

"There You Go" is a song written and originally recorded by Johnny Cash.

The song was released as a single on Sun Records (Sun 258) in late 1956, with "Train of Love" on the opposite side. The single reached #1 on Billboard's Most Played C&W in Juke Boxes chart
