= Sun Records =

American independent record label

- Parent company: Primary Wave
- Founded: February 1, 1952; 74 years ago
- Founder: Sam Phillips
- Distributor: Virgin Music Group
- Genre: Rock and roll, country, blues, rockabilly
- Country of origin: United States
- Location: Memphis, Tennessee
- Official website: sunrecords.com

Sun Records is an American independent record label founded by producer Sam Phillips in Memphis, Tennessee on February 1, 1952. Sun was the first label to record Elvis Presley, Charlie Rich, Roy Orbison, Jerry Lee Lewis, Carl Perkins, and Johnny Cash. Prior to that, Sun had concentrated mainly on African-American musicians because Phillips loved rhythm and blues and wanted to bring it to a white audience.

On January 28, 2021, Sun Records was acquired by Primary Wave for $30 million.

== History ==
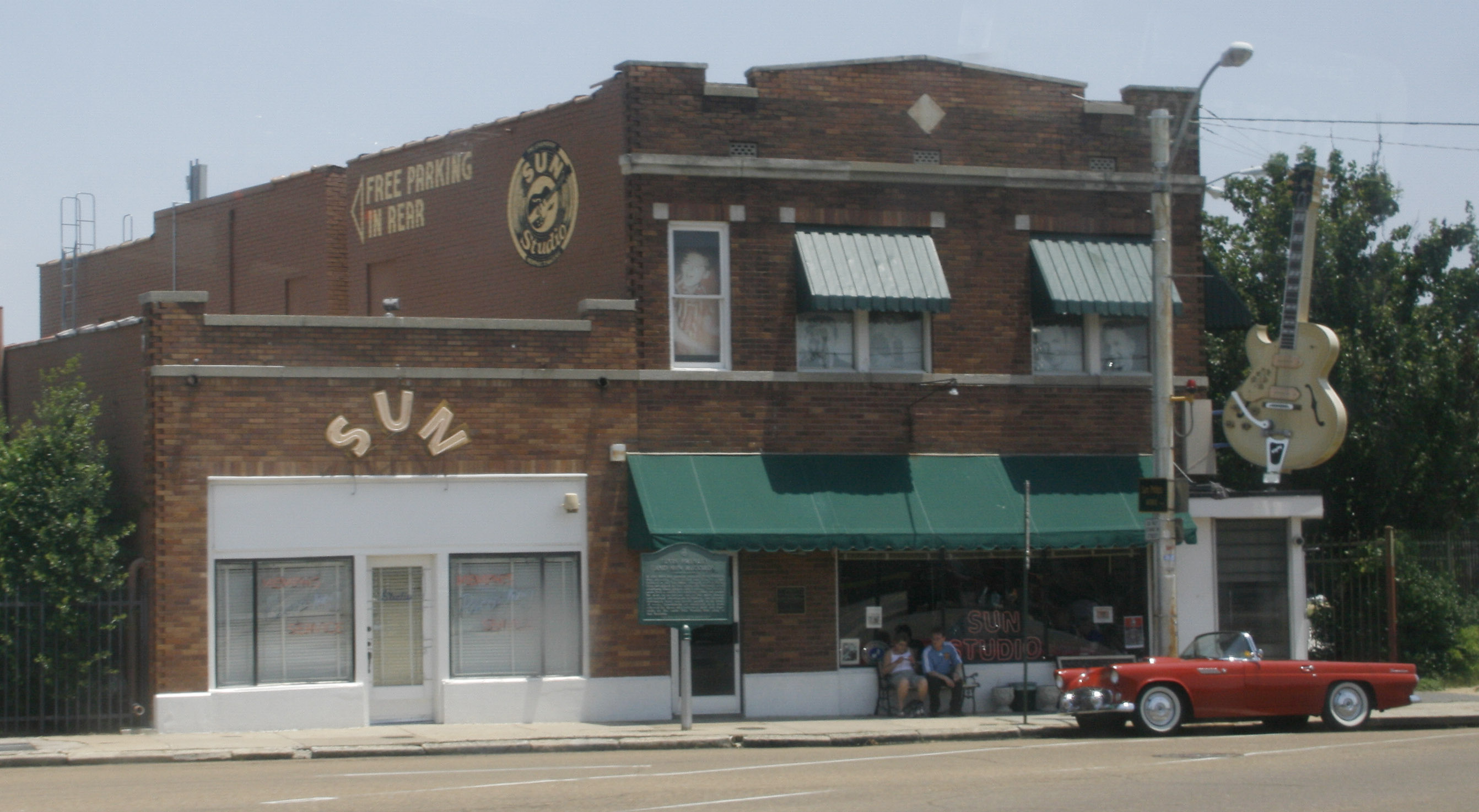
Sun Records in Memphis, Tennessee

Sam Phillips opened his Memphis Recording Service studio on January 3, 1950, at 706 Union Avenue in Memphis. It was founded with the financial aid of Jim Bulliet, one of many record executives for whom Phillips had scouted artists before 1952.

In March 1951, Phillips produced "Rocket 88" by Jackie Brenston and his Delta Cats, who were actually Ike Turner and his Kings of Rhythm. Because of Turner's Delta blues connections, he was contracted by Phillips as a talent scout and he was effectively an in-house producer. Turner brought fellow musicians Howlin' Wolf, Bobby "Blue" Bland, Little Milton, Billy "The Kid" Emerson and Roscoe Gordon to record for Phillips.

The success of "Rocket 88" helped fund the creation of Sun Records which Phillips founded in February 1952. Before creating Sun, Phillips licensed recordings to Chess Records for release. But by 1952, his relationship with the Chess brothers was strained (Leonard and Phil Chess were motivated by financial gain and market share, while Phillips was more artistically minded and into exploring unique, new sounds), and he also had disputes with the Bihari brothers at Modern Records. Initially, Phillips did not want to create a record label. He said, "I was forced into it by those labels either coming to Memphis to record or taking my artists elsewhere."

The original Sun Records logo was designed by John Gale Parker Jr., a resident of Memphis and high school classmate of Phillips. Sun Records shared the same building as Sun Studio (formerly Memphis Recording Service). There, Phillips discovered and first recorded such influential musicians such as Elvis Presley, Carl Perkins, Johnny Cash, and Jerry Lee Lewis. Presley's recording contract was eventually sold to RCA Victor for $40,000 (US$480,745 in 2025 dollars) in 1955 to relieve Sun's financial difficulties. Sun record producer and engineer Jack Clement discovered and recorded Jerry Lee Lewis while Phillips was away on a trip to Florida in 1956.

Some of the other artists who recorded for Sun were Rufus Thomas (who recorded solo and with his daughter Carla Thomas), Tex Weiss, Charlie Rich, Bill Justis, Conway Twitty (who at that time recorded under his real name, Harold Jenkins), Barbara Pittman and the Miller Sisters.

In the Lovin' Spoonful song "Nashville Cats", John Sebastian used poetic license when he referred to Sun as the "Yellow Sun Records from Nashville".

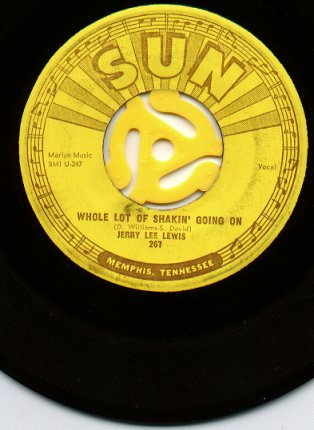
"Whole Lotta Shakin' Goin' On" by Jerry Lee Lewis

In 1969, Mercury Records label producer Shelby Singleton purchased the Sun label from Phillips. Singleton merged his operations into Sun International Corporation, which re-released and re-packaged compilations of Sun's early artists in the early 1970s. It later introduced rockabilly tribute singer Jimmy "Orion" Ellis in 1979, with Orion taking on the persona of Elvis Presley.

The company remains in business as Sun Entertainment Corporation, and currently licenses its brand and classic hit recordings (many of which have appeared in CD boxed sets and other compilations) to independent reissue labels. Sun Entertainment also includes SSS International Records, Plantation Records, Amazon Records, Red Bird Records, Blue Cat Records among other labels the company acquired over the years. Its website sells collectible items and compact discs bearing the original 1950s Sun logo.

Sun Records is located in Nashville, Tennessee. It has been mainly a reissue label since the 1970s but signed country musician Julie Roberts to a recording contract in 2013.

The music of many Sun Records musicians helped lay part of the foundation of late 20th-century rock and roll and influenced many younger musicians, including the Beatles. In 2001, Paul McCartney appeared on a tribute compilation album titled Good Rockin' Tonight: The Legacy of Sun Records. The 2008 tribute Million Dollar Quartet is based on the famous photograph of Carl Perkins, Johnny Cash and Jerry Lee Lewis grouped round Elvis Presley at the piano, the night when the four joined in an impromptu jam at Sun Records' one-room sound studio, the "Million Dollar Quartet" of December 4, 1956.

A TV series about the label ran for eight episodes on CMT from February to April 2017.

In August 2022, Sun Records issued a 70th anniversary compilation album. The album featured contributions from ten of the industry's top music supervisors and includes tracks from artists from the Sun catalogue including James Cotton, Linda Martell, Roy Orbison, Johnny Cash, The Dixie Cups, The Imperial Wonders, Rufus Thomas Jr., and Barbara Pittman.

In November 2022, Peter Guralnick and Colin Escott released The Birth of Rock ‘N’ Roll: The Illustrated Story of Sun Records and the 70 Recordings that Changed the World, a history of Sun Records illustrated by 70 records.

== See also ==
- List of record labels
- Elvis Presley's Sun recordings
- Johnny Cash's Sun recordings
- Roy Orbison's Sun recordings
