= Johnny Cash singles discography =

Singles recorded by American singer

Johnny Cash discography
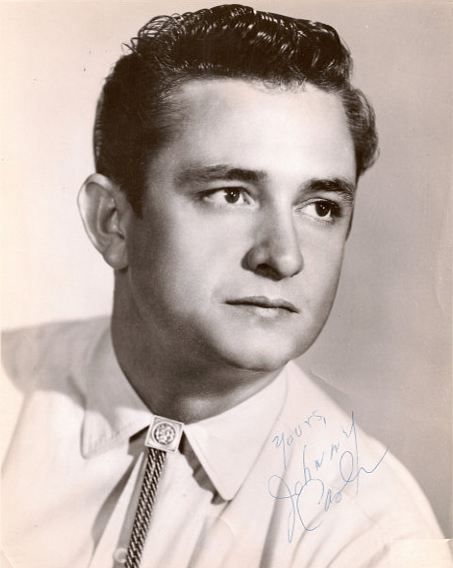
- Singles: 132
- Music videos: 19
- Collaborative singles: 24
- Promotional singles: 3
- Other charted songs: 1
- #1 Singles: 21

The Johnny Cash discography chronicles the output of American singer Johnny Cash. His lengthy career, spanning 1954 to 2003, saw the release of 130 albums and 160 singles on several record labels. Over the years, Cash also collaborated with many of the industry's most notable artists.

== Singles ==
=== 1955–1958: Sun years ===
Year	Single	Peak chart positions			Certifications	Album
Year	Single	US Country	US	AU	Certifications	Album
1955	"Cry! Cry! Cry!" c/w "Hey, Porter"	14	—	—		With His Hot and Blue Guitar
1955	"So Doggone Lonesome" / "Folsom Prison Blues"	4	—	—		With His Hot and Blue Guitar
1955	"So Doggone Lonesome" / "Folsom Prison Blues"	4	—	—		With His Hot and Blue Guitar
1956	"I Walk the Line" / "Get Rhythm"	1	17	43	BPI: Platinum; RMNZ: Platinum	With His Hot and Blue Guitar
1956	"I Walk the Line" / "Get Rhythm"	1	—	—		
1956	"There You Go" / "Train of Love"	1	—	—		Sings the Songs That Made Him Famous
1956	"There You Go" / "Train of Love"	7	—	—		Sings the Songs That Made Him Famous
1957	"Next in Line" / "Don't Make Me Go"	9	99	—		Sings the Songs That Made Him Famous
1957	"Next in Line" / "Don't Make Me Go"	9	—	—		Sings the Songs That Made Him Famous
1957	"Home of the Blues" / "Give My Love to Rose"	3	88	—		Sings the Songs That Made Him Famous
1957	"Home of the Blues" / "Give My Love to Rose"	13	—	—		
1958	"Ballad of a Teenage Queen" / "Big River"	1	14	15		Sings the Songs That Made Him Famous
1958	"Ballad of a Teenage Queen" / "Big River"	4	14	—		Sings the Songs That Made Him Famous
1958	"Guess Things Happen That Way" / "Come In, Stranger"	1	11	54		Sings the Songs That Made Him Famous
1958	"Guess Things Happen That Way" / "Come In, Stranger"	6	66	9		
"—" denotes releases that did not chart

=== 1958–1985: Columbia years ===
Color key

- Singles released by Johnny Cash's former label Sun Records after he had signed with Columbia

==== 1950s ====
Year	Single	Peak chart positions			Album
Year	Single	US Country	US	AU	Album
1958	"The Ways of a Woman in Love" / "You're the Nearest Thing to Heaven"	3	24	28	Sings the Songs That Made Him Famous
1958	"The Ways of a Woman in Love" / "You're the Nearest Thing to Heaven"	5	24		Sings the Songs That Made Him Famous
1958	"All Over Again" / "What Do I Care"	4	38	85	Old Golden Throat
1958	"All Over Again" / "What Do I Care"	7	52	57	Ring of Fire: The Best of Johnny Cash
1958	"It's Just About Time" / "I Just Thought You'd Like to Know"	30	47	—	Greatest!
1958	"It's Just About Time" / "I Just Thought You'd Like to Know"	—	85	89	Greatest!
1958	"Don't Take Your Guns to Town" c/w "I Still Miss Someone"	1	32	3	The Fabulous Johnny Cash
1959	"Luther Played the Boogie" / "Thanks a Lot"	8	—	43	Greatest!
1959	"Luther Played the Boogie" / "Thanks a Lot"	12	—	81	Greatest!
1959	"Frankie's Man, Johnny" / "You Dreamer You"	9	57	97	The Fabulous Johnny Cash
1959	"Frankie's Man, Johnny" / "You Dreamer You"	13	—	—	Old Golden Throat
1959	"Katy Too" c/w "I Forgot to Remember to Forget"	11	66	91	Greatest!
1959	"I Got Stripes" / "Five Feet High and Rising"	4	43	31	Old Golden Throat
1959	"I Got Stripes" / "Five Feet High and Rising"	14	76		Songs of Our Soil
1959	"Goodby Little Darlin'" c/w "You Tell Me"	22	—	—	Greatest!
1959	"The Little Drummer Boy" c/w "I'll Remember You"	24	63	39	The Christmas Spirit
1959	"Straight A's in Love" / "I Love You Because"	16	84	—	Sings Hank Williams
1959	"Straight A's in Love" / "I Love You Because"	20	—	—	Sings Hank Williams
"—" denotes releases that did not chart

==== 1960s ====
Year	Single	Peak chart positions								Certifications	Album
Year	Single	US Country	US	US AC	CAN Country	CAN	CAN AC	AU	UK	Certifications	Album
1960	"Smiling Bill McCall" / "Seasons of My Heart"	13	110	—	—	—	—	77	—		Old Golden Throat
1960	"Smiling Bill McCall" / "Seasons of My Heart"	10	—	—	—	—	—	—	—		Now, There Was a Song!
1960	"Second Honeymoon" / "Honky-Tonk Girl"	15	79	—	—	—	—	—	—		More of Old Golden Throat
1960	"Second Honeymoon" / "Honky-Tonk Girl"	—	92	—	—	—	—	—	—		More of Old Golden Throat
1960	"Down the Street to 301" / "The Story of a Broken Heart"	—	85	—	—	—	—	84	—		Now Here's Johnny Cash
1960	"Down the Street to 301" / "The Story of a Broken Heart"	—	107	—	—	—		—	—		Now Here's Johnny Cash
1960	"Going to Memphis" c/w "Loading Coal"	—	—	—	—	—	—	—	—		Ride This Train
1960	"Mean-Eyed Cat" c/w "Port of Lonely Hearts"	30	—	—	—	—	—	—	—		Sings Hank Williams
1960	"Girl in Saskatoon" c/w "Locomotive Man"	—	—	—	—	—	—	—	—		More of Old Golden Throat
1960	"Oh Lonesome Me" c/w "Life Goes On"	13	93	—	—	—	—	—	—		Now Here's Johnny Cash
1961	"The Rebel – Johnny Yuma" c/w "Forty Shades of Green"	24	108	—	—	—	—	—	—		Ring of Fire: The Best of Johnny Cash
1961	"Sugartime" c/w "My Treasure"	—	—	—	—	—	—	—	—		Now Here's Johnny Cash
1961	"Tennessee Flat Top Box" c/w "Tall Men"	11	84	—	—	—	—	50	—		Ring of Fire: The Best of Johnny Cash
1961	"Tennessee Flat Top Box" c/w "Tall Men"	—	—	—	—	—	—	—	—		—N/a
1962	"The Big Battle" c/w "When I've Learned"	24	—	—	—	—	—	—	—		Ring of Fire: The Best of Johnny Cash
1962	"The Big Battle" c/w "When I've Learned"	—	—	—	—	—	—	—	—		Hymns from the Heart
1962	"Blue Train" c/w "Born to Lose"	—	—	—	—	—	—	—	—		All Aboard the Blue Train with Johnny Cash
1962	"Blue Train" c/w "Born to Lose"	—	—	—	—	—	—	—	—		Original Sun Sound of Johnny Cash
1962	"In the Jailhouse Now" c/w "A Little at a Time"	8	—	—	—	—	—	—	—		The Sound of Johnny Cash
1962	"Bonanza!" c/w "Pick a Bale o' Cotton"	—	94	—	—	—	—	—	—		Ring of Fire: The Best of Johnny Cash
1962	"Bonanza!" c/w "Pick a Bale o' Cotton"	—	—	—	—	—	—	—	—		—N/a
1962	"(There'll Be) Peace in the Valley" c/w "Were You There (When They Crucified My Lord)"	—	—	—	—	—	—	—	—		Ring of Fire: The Best of Johnny Cash
1962	"Busted" c/w "Send a Picture of Mother" (as Johnny Cash with The Carter Family)	13	—	—	—	—	—	—	—		Blood, Sweat and Tears
1963	"Ring of Fire" c/w "I'd Still Be There"	1	17	—	—	—	—	12	—	RIAA: Gold (Mastertone); BPI: Platinum; RMNZ: 2× Platinum	Ring of Fire: The Best of Johnny Cash
1963	"The Matador" c/w "Still in Town"	2	44	—	—	—	—	39	—		Old Golden Throat
1964	"Understand Your Man" / "Dark as a Dungeon"	1	35	—	—	—	—	50	—		I Walk the Line
1964	"Understand Your Man" / "Dark as a Dungeon"	49	119	—	—	—	—	—	—		Old Golden Throat
1964	"Wide Open Road" / "Belshazzar"	—	—	—	—	—	—	—	—		Original Sun Sound of Johnny Cash
1964	"The Ballad of Ira Hayes" / "Bad News"	3	—	—	2	—	—	—	—		Bitter Tears: Ballads of the American Indian
1964	"The Ballad of Ira Hayes" / "Bad News"	8	—	—	5	—	—	—	—		I Walk the Line
1965	"Orange Blossom Special" c/w "All of God's Children Ain't Free"	3	80	—	—	—	2	51	—		Orange Blossom Special
1965	"Mister Garfield" / "The Streets of Laredo"	15	—	—	—	—	—	—	—		Sings the Ballads of the True West
1965	"Mister Garfield" / "The Streets of Laredo"	—	124	—	—	—	—	—	—		Sings the Ballads of the True West
1965	"The Sons of Katie Elder" c/w "A Certain Kind of Hurtin'"	10	119	—	—	—	—	—	—		Old Golden Throat
1965	"Happy to Be with You" c/w "Pickin' Time"	9	—	—	—	—	—	—	—		Happiness Is You
1966	"The One on the Right Is on the Left" c/w "Cotton Pickin' Hands"	2	46	—	—	35	—	68	—		Everybody Loves a Nut
1966	"Everybody Loves a Nut" c/w "Austin Prison"	17	96	—	—	90	—	—	—		Everybody Loves a Nut
1966	"Boa Constrictor" c/w "Bottom of a Mountain"	39	107	—	—	—	—	—	—		Everybody Loves a Nut
1966	"Boa Constrictor" c/w "Bottom of a Mountain"	—	—	—	—	—	—	—	—		More of Old Golden Throat
1966	"You Beat All I Ever Saw" c/w "Put the Sugar to Bed"	20	—	—	—	—	—	—	—		More of Old Golden Throat
1967	"Red Velvet" / "The Wind Changes"	—	—	—	—	—	—	—	—		Old Golden Throat
1967	"Red Velvet" / "The Wind Changes"	60	—	—	—	—	—	—	—		Old Golden Throat
1967	"Rosanna's Going Wild" c/w "Roll Call"	2	91	—	1	—	—	—	—		International Superstar
1967	"Rosanna's Going Wild" c/w "Roll Call"	—	—	—	—	—	—	—	—		More of Old Golden Throat
1968	"Folsom Prison Blues" (live)	1	32	—	1	17	—	43	—	BPI: Gold; RMNZ: Platinum	At Folsom Prison
1968	"Daddy Sang Bass"	1	42	—	1	49	—	88	—		The Holy Land
1969	"A Boy Named Sue" (live)	1	2	1	1	3	1	3	4	RIAA: Gold; BPI: Silver; RMNZ: Gold	At San Quentin
1969	"Blistered" / "See Ruby Fall"	4	50	—	1	—	—	—	—		Hello, I'm Johnny Cash
1969	"Blistered" / "See Ruby Fall"	4	75	—	—	41	—	—	—		Hello, I'm Johnny Cash
"—" denotes releases that did not chart

==== 1970s ====
Year	Single	Peak chart positions								Certifications	Album
Year	Single	US Country	US	US AC	CAN Country	CAN	CAN AC	AU	UK	Certifications	Album
1970	"What Is Truth" c/w "Sing a Traveling Song"	3	19	4	1	9	—	14	21		—N/a
1970	"Sunday Mornin' Comin' Down" (live) c/w "I'm Gonna Try to Be That Way"	1	46	—	1	30	—	24	—		The Johnny Cash Show
1970	"Flesh and Blood" c/w "This Side of the Law"	1	54	—	1	41	23	94	—		I Walk the Line (soundtrack)
1971	"Man in Black" c/w "Little Bit of Yesterday"	3	58	—	2	38	—	43	—		Man in Black
1971	"Singing in Viet Nam Talking Blues" c/w "You've Got a New Light Shining"	18	124	—	—	—	—	—	—		Man in Black
1971	"Papa Was a Good Man" c/w "I Promise You"	16	104	—	17	—	—	—	—		A Thing Called Love
1971	"A Thing Called Love" c/w "Daddy"	2	103	37	1	—	—	—	4		A Thing Called Love
1972	"Kate" c/w "Miracle Man"	2	75	—	1	89	—	—	—		A Thing Called Love
1972	"If I Had a Hammer"	29	—	—	—	—	—	—	—		Any Old Wind That Blows
1972	"Oney" c/w "Country Trash"	2	101	—	1	—	—	43	—		Any Old Wind That Blows
1972	"Any Old Wind That Blows" c/w "Kentucky Straight"	3	—	—	1	—	—	—	—		Any Old Wind That Blows
1973	"Children" c/w "Last Supper"	30	—	—	15	—	—	—	—		The Gospel Road
1973	"Praise the Lord and Pass the Soup" (with The Carter Family and The Oak Ridge Boys)	57	—	—	65	—	—	—	—		—N/a
1973	"Pick the Wildwood Flower" (with Maybelle Carter)	34	—	—	—	—	—	—	—		—N/a
1974	"Orleans Parish Prison" (live) c/w "Jacob Green" (live)	52	—	—	—	—	—	—	—		På Österåker
1974	"Ragged Old Flag"	31	—	—	—	—	—	—	—		Ragged Old Flag
1974	"The Junkie and the Juicehead, Minus Me"	—	—	—	32	—	—	—	—		The Junkie and the Juicehead Minus Me
1974	"Father and Daughter (Father and Son)" (with Rosey Nix)	—	—	—	—	—	—	—	—		The Junkie and the Juicehead Minus Me
1974	"The Lady Came from Baltimore" c/w "Lonesome to the Bone"	14	—	—	11	—	—	—	—		John R. Cash
1975	"My Old Kentucky Home (Turpentine and Dandelion Wine)"	42	—	—	—	—	—	—	—		John R. Cash
1975	"Look at Them Beans" c/w "All Around Cowboy"	17	—	—	17	—	—	—	—		Look at Them Beans
1975	"Texas 1947" c/w "I Hardly Ever Sing Beer Drinking Songs"	35	—	—	29	—	—	—	—		Look at Them Beans
1976	"Strawberry Cake" (live) c/w "I Got Stripes" (live)	54	—	—	49	—	—	—	—		Strawberry Cake
1976	"One Piece at a Time" c/w "Go On Blues"	1	29	6	1	40	1	82	32		One Piece at a Time
1976	"Sold Out of Flagpoles" c/w "Mountain Lady"	29	—	—	26	—	—	—	—		One Piece at a Time
1976	"It's All Over" c/w "Ridin' on the Cotton Belt"	41	—	—	—	—	—	—	—		Greatest Hits, Vol. 3
1977	"The Last Gunfighter Ballad" c/w "City Jail"	38	—	—	38	—	—	—	—		The Last Gunfighter Ballad
1977	"Lady" c/w "Lately"	46	—	—	34	—	—	—	—		The Rambler
1977	"After the Ball" c/w "Calilou"	32	—	—	42	—	—	—	—		The Rambler
1978	"I Would Like to See You Again" c/w "Lately"	12	—	—	23	—	—	—	—		I Would Like to See You Again
1978	"Gone Girl" c/w "I'm Alright Now"	44	—	—	53	—	—	—	—		Gone Girl
1978	"It'll Be Her" c/w "It Comes and Goes"	89	—	—	—	—	—	—	—		Gone Girl
1978	"I Will Rock and Roll with You" c/w "A Song for the Life" (with Rosanne Cash)	21	—	—	36	—	—	—	—		Gone Girl
1979	"(Ghost) Riders in the Sky"	2	—	—	1	—	—	—	—	RMNZ: Gold	Silver
1979	"I'll Say It's True" c/w "Cocaine Blues"	42	—	—	63	—	—	—	—		Silver
"—" denotes releases that did not chart

==== 1980s ====
Year	Single	Peak chart positions			Album
Year	Single	US Country	CAN Country	AU	Album
1980	"Wings in the Morning"	—	—	—	A Believer Sings the Truth
1980	"Bull Rider" c/w "Lonesome to the Bone"	66	—	—	Silver
1980	"Song of the Patriot" c/w "She's a Go-er"	54	—	—	Encore
1980	"Cold Lonesome Morning"	53	74	—	Rockabilly Blues
1980	"The Last Time" c/w "Rockabilly Blues (Texas 1955)"	85	—	—	Rockabilly Blues
1981	"Without Love" c/w "It Ain't Nothing New Babe"	78	68	—	Rockabilly Blues
1981	"The Baron" c/w "I Will Dance with You"	10	6	77	The Baron
1981	"Mobile Bay" c/w "The Hard Way"	60	—	—	The Baron
1982	"The Reverend Mr. Black" / "Chattanooga City Limit Sign"	71	—	—	The Baron
1982	"The Reverend Mr. Black" / "Chattanooga City Limit Sign"	71	—	—	The Baron
1982	"The General Lee" c/w "Duelin' Dukes"	26	23	—	The Dukes of Hazzard (soundtrack)
1982	"Georgia on a Fast Train" c/w "Sing a Song"	55	41	—	The Adventures of Johnny Cash
1982	"Fair Weather Friends"	—	—	—	The Adventures of Johnny Cash
1983	"We Must Believe in Magic" c/w "I'll Cross over Jordan Someday"	84	—	—	The Adventures of Johnny Cash
1983	"I'm Ragged but I'm Right"	75	—	—	Johnny 99
1983	"Johnny 99"	—	—	—	Johnny 99
1984	"That's the Truth" c/w "Joshua Gone Barbados"	84	43	—	Johnny 99
1984	"The Chicken in Black" c/w "Battle of Nashville"	45	—	—	—N/a
1984	"They Killed Him"	—	—	—	—N/a
1985	"I'm Leaving Now"	—	—	—	Rainbow

- In 1986 Johnny Cash released a single on Ezra records 227 entitled "the Man in White" ( side 1, stereo, side 2, mono).

=== 1987–1991: Mercury years ===
==== 1980s ====
Year	Single	Peak chart positions			Album
Year	Single	US Country	CAN Country	AU	Album
1987	"The Night Hank Williams Came to Town" (with Waylon Jennings) c/w "I'd Rather Have You"	43	—	—	Johnny Cash Is Coming to Town
1987	"Sixteen Tons"	—	—	—	Johnny Cash Is Coming to Town
1987	"Let Him Roll"	—	—	—	Johnny Cash Is Coming to Town
1987	"W. Lee O'Daniel (and the Light Crust Dough Boys)" c/w "Letters from Home"	72	—	—	Johnny Cash Is Coming to Town
1988	"Get Rhythm" (re-recording)	—	—	—	Classic Cash: Hall of Fame Series
1988	"That Old Wheel" (with Hank Williams Jr.) c/w "Tennessee Flat Top Box" (re-recording)	21	30	—	Water from the Wells of Home
1988	"That Old Wheel" (with Hank Williams Jr.) c/w "Tennessee Flat Top Box" (re-recording)	—	—	—	Classic Cash: Hall of Fame Series
1989	"Ballad of a Teenage Queen" (re-recording; with Rosanne Cash and The Everly Brothers)	45	—	—	Water from the Wells of Home
"—" denotes releases that did not chart

==== 1990s ====
Year	Single	Peak positions	Album
Year	Single	US Country	Album
1990	"Farmer's Almanac"	—^{A}	Boom Chicka Boom
1990	"Cat's in the Cradle"	—	Boom Chicka Boom
1990	"Goin' by the Book" c/w "Beans for Breakfast"	69	The Mystery of Life
1991	"The Mystery of Life"	—	The Mystery of Life
1991	"Wanted Man"	—	The Mystery of Life
"—" denotes releases that did not chart

- ^{A} "Farmer's Almanac" did not chart on Hot Country Songs, but peaked at No. 10 on Hot Country Radio Breakouts.

=== Since 1991: American Recordings years and posthumous releases ===
==== 1990s ====
Year	Single	Peak positions	Album
Year	Single	US Country	Album
1994	"Delia's Gone"	—	American Recordings
1994	"Drive On"	—	American Recordings
1996	"Rusty Cage"	—	American II: Unchained
"—" denotes releases that did not chart

==== 2000s and 2010s ====
Year	Single	Peak chart positions				Certifications	Album
Year	Single	US Country	US	CAN	UK	Certifications	Album
2002	"Personal Jesus"	—	—	—	39		American IV: The Man Comes Around
2003	"Hurt" c/w "Personal Jesus"	56	—	—	39	RIAA: Gold; BPI: 2× Platinum; BVMI: Gold; FIMI: Gold; RMNZ: 3× Platinum	
2006	"God's Gonna Cut You Down"	—	—	—	77	BPI: Gold; RMNZ: Gold	American V: A Hundred Highways
2010	"Ain't No Grave"	—	112	95	170		American VI: Ain't No Grave
2014	"She Used to Love Me a Lot"	—	—	—	136		Out Among the Stars
2014	"I'm Movin' On" (with Waylon Jennings)	—	—	—	—		Out Among the Stars
2014	"Baby, Ride Easy" (with June Carter Cash)	—	—	—	—		Out Among the Stars
2014	"Out Among the Stars"	—	—	—	—		Out Among the Stars
2014	"The Man Comes Around" / "Personal Jesus"	—	—	—	—		American IV: The Man Comes Around
"—" denotes releases that did not chart

== Other singles ==
=== Promotional singles ===
Year	Single	Peak chart positions					Album
Year	Single	US Country	US	US AC	CAN Country	CAN	Album
1969	"Get Rhythm" (re-release)	23	60	—	1	59	—N/a
1970	"Rock Island Line"	35	93	22	—	—	—N/a
1970	"Big River"	41	—	—	18	—	Greatest Hits, Vol. 2
"—" denotes releases that did not chart

=== Singles with June Carter Cash ===
Year	Single	Peak chart positions							Certifications	Album
Year	Single	US Country	US	CAN Country	CAN	CAN AC	AU	UK	Certifications	Album
1964	"It Ain't Me Babe"	4	58	—	—	—	85	28		Orange Blossom Special
1967	"Jackson"	2	—	—	—	—	—	—	BPI: Silver; RMNZ: Gold	Johnny Cash's Greatest Hits Volume 1
1967	"Long-Legged Guitar Pickin' Man"	6	—	—	—	—	—	—		Carryin' On with Johnny Cash and June Carter
1969	"If I Were a Carpenter"	2	36	1	13	11	52	—		Hello, I'm Johnny Cash
1971	"No Need to Worry"	15	—	7	—	—	—	—		International Superstar
1972	"The Loving Gift"	27	—	22	—	—	—	—		Any Old Wind That Blows
1973	"Allegheny"	69	—	35	—	—	—	—		Johnny Cash and His Woman
1976	"Old Time Feeling"	26	—	24	—	—	—	—		Greatest Hits, Vol. 3
"—" denotes releases that did not chart

=== Singles with The Carter Family ===
Year	Single	Artist	Peak chart positions		Album
Year	Single	Artist	US Country	CAN Country	Album
1971	"A Song to Mama"	The Carter Family	37	42	Travelin' Minstrel Band
1972	"The World Needs a Melody"	The Carter Family	35	55	Travelin' Minstrel Band

=== Singles with Waylon Jennings ===
Year	Single	Peak chart positions		Album
Year	Single	US Country	CAN Country	Album
1978	"There Ain't No Good Chain Gang" / "I Wish I Was Crazy Again"	2	5	I Would Like to See You Again
1978	"There Ain't No Good Chain Gang" / "I Wish I Was Crazy Again"	22	25	I Would Like to See You Again
1986	"Even the Cowgirls Get the Blues"	35	40	Heroes
1986	"The Ballad of Forty Dollars"	—	50	Heroes
"—" denotes releases that did not chart

=== Singles with Waylon Jennings, Willie Nelson and Kris Kristofferson ===
The Highwaymen's first two albums and singles released from them were credited to "Waylon Jennings, Willie Nelson, Johnny Cash, Kris Kristofferson".

Year	Single	Peak chart positions				Album
Year	Single	US Country	CAN Country	CAN AC	AUS	Album
1985	"Highwayman" c/w "The Human Condition" (with Willie Nelson)	1	1	19	98	Highwayman
1985	"Desperados Waiting for a Train" c/w "The Twentieth Century Is Almost Over" (with Willie Nelson)	15	20	—	—	Highwayman
1990	"Silver Stallion" c/w "American Remains"	25	21	—	—	Highwayman 2
1990	"Born and Raised in Black and White" c/w "Texas"	—^{A}	—	—	—	Highwayman 2
1990	"American Remains" c/w "Texas"	—	—	—	—	Highwayman 2
"—" denotes releases that did not chart

- ^{A} "Born and Raised in Black and White" did not chart on Hot Country Songs, but peaked at No. 1 on Hot Country Radio Breakouts.

=== Other singles as a featured artist ===
Year	Single	Artist	Peak chart positions		Album
Year	Single	Artist	US Country	CAN Country	Album
1984	"I Will Dance with You"	Karen Brooks	45	—	Hearts on Fire
1991	"Man in Black"	One Bad Pig	—	—	I Scream Sunday
1993	"The Devil Comes Back to Georgia"	Mark O'Connor (with Charlie Daniels, Marty Stuart and Travis Tritt)	54	—	Heroes
1998	"I Walk the Line Revisited"	Rodney Crowell	61	—	The Houston Kid
2003	"September When It Comes"	Rosanne Cash	—	—	Rules of Travel
2019	"Redemption Day"	Sheryl Crow	—	—	Threads
"—" denotes releases that did not chart

== Other certified songs ==
Year	Song	Certifications	Album
2002	"The Man Comes Around"	BPI: Silver; RMNZ: Gold	American IV: The Man Comes Around

== Music videos ==
Year	Single	Director
1981	"The Baron"	
1983	"Johnny 99"	
1984	"The Chicken in Black"	Sherman Halsey
1987	"Sixteen Tons"	
1987	"Let Him Roll"	
1991	"Goin' by the Book"	Coke Sams/Michael Salomon
1993	"The Devil Comes Back to Georgia" (with Mark O'Connor, Charlie Daniels, Marty Stuart and Travis Tritt)	Gustavo Garzon
1994	"Delia's Gone"	Anton Corbijn
1994	"The Man Who Couldn't Cry"	
1996	"Rusty Cage"	
1999	"Folsom Prison Blues"	Steven T. Miller/R. Brad Murano
2001	"I Walk the Line Revisited" (with Rodney Crowell)	
2002	"Hurt"	Mark Romanek
2003	"September When It Comes" (with Rosanne Cash)	
2006	"God's Gonna Cut You Down"	Tony Kaye
2007	"Help Me"	Tony Kaye
2010	"Ain't No Grave"	Chris Milk
2014	"She Used to Love Me a Lot"	John Hillcoat
2019	"Redemption Day" (with Sheryl Crow)	Shaun Silva
