= Greatest Hits, Vol. 3 (Johnny Cash album) =

1978 compilation album by Johnny Cash

Greatest hits album by Johnny Cash
- Released: October 1978
- Genre: Country; country rock; folk
- Length: 25:46
- Label: Columbia
- Producer: Larry Butler; Charlie Bragg; Johnny Cash; Don Davis

Johnny Cash chronology
I Would Like to See You Again (1978)	Greatest Hits, Vol. 3 (1978)	Gone Girl (1978)

Professional ratings
Review scores
Source	Rating
AllMusic	3/5 stars
Christgau's Record Guide	B−

Greatest Hits, Vol. 3 is a greatest hits compilation by country singer Johnny Cash, released on Columbia Records in 1978 (see 1978 in music). It is the third and last part of the Johnny Cash Greatest Hits compilation series; the previous parts, Greatest Hits, Vol. 1 and Greatest Hits, Vol. 2, had been released in 1967 and 1971, respectively.

The release is notable in that it contains two songs - "It's All Over" and "Old Time Feeling," - which hadn't appeared on any Johnny Cash album before.

"It's All Over" was first released as a single in September 1976, peaking at No. 41 Country (a.k.a. C&W). This song was previously demoed at House of Cash in Hendersonville on July 11, 1973, appearing 33 years later on Cash's Personal File double CD. The 1973 demo of "It's All Over" is the only available (cd/mp3) version of this rare song as of June 2010. This was until the Reader's Digest box set The Great Seventies Recordings was released featuring this version of "It's All Over"

"Old Time Feeling" was then rush-released as Cash's next single in October 1976, reaching the Top 30 at No. 26 C&W.

"I Wish I Was Crazy Again", featuring Waylon Jennings, had only recently been featured on the album I Would Like to See You Again in April 1978. It was first released as the B-side of the popular #2 C&W hit "There Ain't No Good Chain Gang" (also with Jennings and also from the aforementioned album). By November 1979, popular demand caused "I Wish I Was Crazy Again" to be issued as an A-side, almost making the Top 20 at No. 22 C&W.

The album itself reached No. 49, despite the fact that a third of its contents had only just been featured a few months earlier on the album I Would Like to See You Again and two other tracks from the less-than-a-year-old The Rambler.

== Track listing ==
No.	Title	Writer(s)	Original album	Length
1.	"There Ain't No Good Chain Gang"	Hal Bynum, Dave Kirby	Any Old Wind That Blows (1973)	3:18
2.	"Oney"	Jerry Chesnut	Any Old Wind That Blows (1973)	3:07
3.	"Any Old Wind That Blows"	Dick Feller	Any Old Wind That Blows (1973)	2:39
4.	"Old Time Feeling"	Cash	—	2:44
5.	"I Would Like to See You Again" (with Waylon Jennings)	Larry T. Atwood, Charlie Craig	I Would Like to See You Again (1978)	2:55
6.	"I Wish I Was Crazy Again"	Bob McDill	I Would Like to See You Again (1978)	2:44
7.	"One Piece at a Time"	Wayne Kemp	One Piece at a Time (1976)	4:00
8.	"After the Ball"	Cash	The Rambler (1977)	2:48
9.	"Lady"	Cash	The Rambler (1977)	2:48
10.	"It's All Over"	Cash	—	1:50

== Charts ==
Album - Billboard (United States)

Year	Chart	Position
1978	Country Albums	49

Singles - Billboard (United States)

Year	Single	Chart	Position
1976	"It's All Over"	Country Singles	41
1978	"Old Time Feeling"	Country Singles	26
1978	"I Wish I Was Crazy Again"	Country Singles	22
