= Encore (Johnny Cash album) =

Compilation album by Johnny Cash
- Released: 1981
- Genre: Country
- Length: 30:39
- Label: Columbia
- Producer: Larry Butler; Brian Ahern; Earl Ball; Jack Clement; Nick Lowe; Charlie Bragg; Johnny Cash; Don Davis; Gary Klein

Johnny Cash chronology
The Baron (1981)	Encore (1981)	The Survivors (1982)

Singles from Encore
- 1. "Song of the Patriot" Released: 1980

Professional ratings
Review scores
Source	Rating
AllMusic	2/5 stars

Encore is a compilation album by country singer Johnny Cash, released on Columbia Records in 1981 (see 1981 in music). It consists of a handful of songs from previous Cash records, including the hit single "(Ghost) Riders in the Sky", and "Song of the Patriot"; featuring Marty Robbins. The latter song was also released as a single, with minor chart success, as was "Without Love".

== Track listing ==
No.	Title	Writer(s)	Length
1.	"I Will Rock and Roll with You"	Johnny Cash	2:54
2.	"Without Love"	Nick Lowe	2:26
3.	"Gone Girl"	Jack Clement	3:12
4.	"I'll Say It's True"	Johnny Cash	2:48
5.	"Cold Lonesome Morning"	Johnny Cash	3:21
6.	"(Ghost) Riders in the Sky"	Stan Jones	3:49
7.	"Song of the Patriot" (with Marty Robbins)	Shirl Milete, Marty Robbins	3:28
8.	"The Lady Came from Baltimore"	Tim Hardin	2:43
9.	"Texas–1947"	Guy Clark	3:10
10.	"The Last Gunfighter Ballad"	Guy Clark	2:48

== Charts ==
Singles – Billboard (United States)

Year	Single	Chart	Position
1980	"Song of the Patriot"	Country Singles	54
