= Gone Girl =

Gone Girl may refer to:

- Gone Girl (album), a 1978 album by Johnny Cash
  - "Gone Girl" (Johnny Cash song) from the album by Johnny Cash
- "Gone Girl" (Iann Dior song), 2019
- "Gone Girl", a song by SZA from the 2022 album SOS
- Gone Girl (novel), a 2012 thriller novel by Gillian Flynn
  - Gone Girl (film), a 2014 film based on the novel, directed by David Fincher
    - Gone Girl (soundtrack), a soundtrack album for the 2014 film
- "Gone Girl", a short story written by Ross Macdonald
- "Gone Girl" (The Vampire Diaries), an episode of the TV series The Vampire Diaries which first aired in 2014
- Gone Girl (Katie Sawyer), a Marvel Comics character and member of X-Statix
- The Real Gone Girls, a 1970 film based on the 1965 novel of the same name, directed by James Hill
- A kidnapping committed by Matthew Muller initially believed to be a hoax was referred to as the "Gone Girl" kidnapping

== See also ==
- Girls Gone By Publishers, a UK publisher
