= Classic Christmas (Johnny Cash album) =

Studio album by Johnny Cash
- Released: November 3, 1980
- Recorded: August 19–20, 1980
- Studio: CBS Studios (Nashville, Tennessee)
- Genre: Country; Christmas
- Length: 31:44
- Label: Columbia
- Producer: Bill Walker

Johnny Cash chronology
Rockabilly Blues (1980)	Classic Christmas (1980)	The Baron (1981)

Professional ratings
Review scores
Source	Rating
Allmusic	3/5 stars

Classic Christmas is the third Christmas album and 65th overall album by American country singer Johnny Cash, released on Columbia Records in 1980 (see 1980 in music). Unlike The Christmas Spirit or Family Christmas, none of the songs are originals; all are traditional Christmas songs. It is the third full-length Christmas album by Cash. A fourth Christmas album Country Christmas recorded and released in 1991 for the Delta Music label featuring rerecordings of many of the songs on Classic Christmas.

== Track listing ==
No.	Title	Writer(s)	Length
1.	"Joy to the World"	Lowell Mason, Isaac Watts	2:04
2.	"Away in a Manger"	William James Kirkpatrick/Traditional	3:05
3.	"O Little Town of Bethlehem"	Phillips Brooks, Lewis Redner	3:26
4.	"Silent Night"	Franz Xaver Gruber, Joseph Mohr	3:01
5.	"It Came Upon a Midnight Clear"	Edmund Sears, Richard Storrs Willis	3:37
6.	"Hark! The Herald Angels Sing"	Felix Mendelssohn, Charles Wesley	2:29
7.	"I Heard the Bells on Christmas Day"	Jean Baptiste Calkin, Henry Wadsworth Longfellow	2:19
8.	"O Come All Ye Faithful"	Frederick Oakeley, John Francis Wade	2:55
9.	"Little Gray Donkey"	Charles Tazewell, Roger Wagner	4:11
10.	"The Christmas Guest"	Grandpa Jones, Bill Walker	4:37

== Personnel ==
- Johnny Cash - vocals, arrangements
- The Bill Walker Orchestra - orchestra
- The Bill Walker Choir - chorus
- Bill Walker - arrangements, conductor

Technical

- Ron Reynolds - engineer
- Elizabeth Barker White - cover art
