= International Superstar =

Compilation album by Johnny Cash
- Released: November 1972
- Genre: Country; folk
- Length: 63:11
- Label: Columbia

Johnny Cash chronology
The Johnny Cash Family Christmas (1972)	International Superstar (1972)	På Österåker (1973)

Professional ratings
Review scores
Source	Rating
AllMusic	2/5 stars

International Superstar is a double compilation album and the 42nd overall album by country singer Johnny Cash, released on Columbia Records in 1972 (see 1972 in music). It is a collection of previously released material, including hit singles like "A Thing Called Love" and "The One on the Right Is on the Left", though a number of tracks in the collection were making their first appearance on an album.

== Track listing ==
No.	Title	Writer(s)	Length
1.	"A Thing Called Love"	Jerry Reed	2:35
2.	"No Need to Worry"	Johnny Cash	2:49
3.	"Happiness Is You"	Johnny Cash, June Carter Cash	3:00
4.	"Song to Mama"	Helen Carter, June Carter, Johnny Cash, Glenn Phillip Jones	2:38
5.	"Cotton Pickin' Hands"	Johnny Cash, Johnny Cash	2:21
6.	"San Quentin"	Johnny Cash	2:32
7.	"Jackson"	Jerry Leiber [as Gaby Rodgers], Billy Edd Wheeler	2:47
8.	"Rosanna's Going Wild"	Anita Carter, Helen Carter, June Carter, Johnny Cash	1:59
9.	"Austin Prison"	Johnny Cash	2:08
10.	"Pick a Bale of Cotton"	Lead Belly, Alan Lomax	1:58
11.	"White Girl"	Peter La Farge	3:03
12.	"The Shifting Whispering Sands, Pt. 1"	Jack Gilbert, Mary Hadler	2:53
13.	"Kate"	Marty Robbins	2:17
14.	"The One on the Right Is on the Left"	Jack Clement	2:51
15.	"You and Tennessee"	Johnny Cash	3:07
16.	"Hammers and Nails"	Lucille Groah	2:40
17.	"Tall Man"	Ken Darby	1:53
18.	"I'll Be Loving You"	Johnny Cash	2:09
19.	"From Sea to Shining Sea"	Johnny Cash	1:39
20.	"Folk Singer"	Charlie Daniels	3:05
21.	"Mr. Garfield"	Ramblin' Jack Elliott	3:45
22.	"If Not for Love"	Larry Michael Lee, Glenn Tubb	3:05
23.	"Mississippi Sand"	Johnny Cash	3:08
24.	"I Got a Boy (and His Name Is John)"	Johnny Cash	2:49

== Charts ==
Singles - Billboard (United States)

Year	Single	Chart	Position
1972	"Rosanna's Going Wild"	Country Singles	2
1972	"Rosanna's Going Wild"	Hot 100	91
