= Mobile Bay (song) =

Song by Johnny Cash

Single by Johnny Cash

from the album The Baron
- B-side: "The Hard Way"
- Released: July 1981
- Genre: Country
- Label: Columbia 18-02189
- Songwriters: Curly Putman, David Kirby
- Producer: Billy Sherrill

Johnny Cash singles chronology
"The Baron" (1981)	"Mobile Bay" (1981)	"The Reverend Mr. Black" / "Chattanooga City Limit Sign" (1982)

Audio
- "Mobile Bay" on YouTube

"Mobile Bay" (/ˈmoʊbiːl/) is a song written by Curly Putman and David Kirby and originally recorded by Johnny Cash for his Billy Sherrill–produced 1981 album The Baron.

Released in July 1981 as a single (Columbia 18-02189, with "The Hard Way" on the B-side), the song reached number 60 on U.S. Billboard's country chart for the week of August 15, 1981.

== Track listing ==
7" single (Columbia 18-02189, 1981)
No.	Title	Writer(s)	Length
1.	"Mobile Bay"	C. Putman, D. Kirby	3:00
2.	"The Hard Way"	J. L. Lansdowne	2:57

== Charts ==
Chart (1981)	Peak position
US Hot Country Songs (Billboard)	60
