= Now Here's Johnny Cash =

Compilation album by Johnny Cash
- Released: June 26, 1961
- Recorded: September 1954–July 17, 1958
- Genres: Country; rockabilly
- Length: Original: 27:13; Re-issue: 38:39
- Label: Sun
- Producers: Sam Phillips; Jack Clement; Bill Dahl; Cary E. Mansfield

Johnny Cash chronology
Johnny Cash Sings Hank Williams (1960)	Now Here's Johnny Cash (1961)	Hymns from the Heart (1962)

Singles from Now Here's Johnny Cash
- 1. "Hey, Porter" Released: June 21, 1955; 2. "The Story of a Broken Heart" / "Down the Street to 301" Released: June 14, 1960; 3. "Oh Lonesome Me" Released: December 10, 1960; 4. "Sugartime" Released: May 26, 1961

Professional ratings
Review scores
Source	Rating
AllMusic	3/5 stars

Now Here's Johnny Cash is a compilation album by American singer-songwriter Johnny Cash. It was released on June 26, 1961, by Sun Records after Cash had left the label and signed with Columbia Records. The album is made up of songs Cash recorded for Sun prior to leaving the label. The album was re-issued in 2003 by Varèse Sarabande, with five bonus tracks. In 2007 it was re-released with Greatest! on one CD.

== Track listing ==
Side one
No.	Title	Writer(s)	Length
1.	"Sugartime"	Odis Echols, Charlie Phillips	1:48
2.	"Down the Street to 301"	Jack Clement	2:06
3.	"Life Goes On"	Cash, Clement	2:02
4.	"Port of Lonely Hearts"	Cash	2:36
5.	"Cry! Cry! Cry!"	Cash	2:29
6.	"My Treasure"	Cash	1:16

Side two
No.	Title	Writer(s)	Length
7.	"Oh Lonesome Me"	Don Gibson	2:30
8.	"So Doggone Lonesome"	Cash	2:37
9.	"You're the Nearest Thing to Heaven"	Jim Atkins, Cash, Hoyt Johnson	2:40
10.	"The Story of a Broken Heart"	Sam Phillips	2:11
11.	"Hey, Porter"	Cash	2:15
12.	"Home of the Blues"	Cash, Glen Douglas, Vic McAlpin	2:43

Bonus tracks
No.	Title	Writer(s)	Length
13.	"I Couldn't Keep from Crying"	Marty Robbins	2:03
14.	"Sugartime" (Undubbed Master)	Odis Echols, Charlie Phillips	1:47
15.	"My Treasure" (Undubbed Master)	Cash	2:19
16.	"Oh Lonesome Me" (Undubbed Master)	Don Gibson	2:31
17.	"Home of the Blues" (Undubbed Master)	Cash, Glen Douglas, Vic McAlpin	2:46
Total length:			38:39

== Personnel ==
- Johnny Cash - Vocals, Rhythm guitar
- Luther Perkins - Lead guitar
- Marshall Grant - Bass
- Al Casey - Guitar

Additional personnel

- Sam Phillips - Producer
- Jack Clement - Producer
- Cary E. Mansfield - Reissue Producer
- Bill Dahl - Liner Notes, Reissue Producer
- Dan Hersch - Digital Remastering
- Bill Pitzonka - Art Direction, Design

== Charts ==
Singles - Billboard (United States)

Year	Single	Chart	Position
1960	"Down the Street to 301"	Pop Singles	85
1960	"Oh Lonesome Me"	Country Singles	13
1960	"Oh Lonesome Me"	Pop Singles	93
