= Boa Constrictor (song) =

- Dutch release picture sleeve

Single by Johnny Cash

from the album Everybody Loves a Nut
- A-side: "Boa Constrictor" "Bottom of a Mountain"
- Released: 1966
- Genre: Country, novelty
- Length: 1:45
- Label: Columbia 4-43763
- Songwriter: Shel Silverstein
- Producers: Don Law and Frank Jones

Audio
- "Boa Constrictor" on YouTube

"Boa Constrictor" is a song written by Shel Silverstein and originally featured on his 1962 album Inside Folk Songs.

== Johnny Cash version ==
The song was covered by Johnny Cash for his 1966 comedy album Everybody Loves a Nut.

Released as the third single from the album (Columbia 4-43763, with a non-album track "Bottom of a Mountain" on the opposite side), the song reached number 39 on the U.S. Billboard country chart. and number 33 on the Cash Box country chart.

In January 1967 the song was re-released as a single with "The One on the Right Is on the Left" on the other side.

=== Lyrical analysis and background ===
"Boa Constrictor" is another song written by Shel Silverstein. It has a similarly frantic feel to Cash's earlier recording of Silverstein's "25 Minutes to Go." In this song, the singer is being swallowed by a boa constrictor and counting down the body parts the snake is consuming along the way. [...] The snake's burp at the end is priceless.

— John M. Alexander. The Man in Song: A Discographic Biography of Johnny Cash

The third single, “Boa Constrictor,” was the second Shel Silverstein song Cash recorded (the first being "25 Minutes to Go"). It fared even worse than "Everybody Loves a Nut," reaching only #43 [sic!] on the Country chart and #107 on the Pop chart (Cash's last Pop chart entry for over a year). The song would live on, though, in Silverstein's 1974 bestselling collection of poems, Where the Sidewalk Ends. The B-side was a non-album track called "Bottom of [a] Mountain," featuring the acoustic work of Norman Blake and Bob Johnson.

— C. Eric Banister. Johnny Cash FAQ: All That's Left to Know About the Man in Black

== Other versions ==
According to John M. Alexander and his book The Man in Song, the song "was also famously covered by the folk trio Peter, Paul and Mary".

== Track listings ==
7" single (Columbia 4-43673, 1966)
No.	Title	Writer(s)	Length
1.	"Bottom of a Mountain"	Don McKinnon	2:23
2.	"Boa Constrictor"	Shel Silverstein	1:45

7" single (Columbia 4-33109, 1967)
No.	Title	Writer(s)	Length
1.	"The One on the Right Is on the Left"	J. H. Clement	2:46
2.	"Boa Constrictor"	Shel Silverstein	1:45

== Charts ==
Chart (1966)	Peak position
US Bubbling Under Hot 100 (Billboard)	107
US Hot Country Songs (Billboard)	39
