= Dirty Old Egg-Sucking Dog =

Song by Johnny Cash

from the album Everybody Loves a Nut
- Released: 1966
- Genre: Country, novelty
- Length: 2:05
- Label: Columbia
- Songwriter(s): Jack Clement

Audio
- "Dirty Old Egg-Sucking Dog" on YouTube

"Dirty Old Egg-Sucking Dog" is a song written by Jack Clement and originally recorded by Johnny Cash on Columbia Records for his novelty album Everybody Loves a Nut, released in 1966. Cash notably performed the song at Folsom Prison on January 13, 1968, and it appears on his live album At Folsom Prison released later that year.

== Composition ==
“Dirty Old Egg-Sucking Dog” first appeared on Cash's Everybody Loves a Nut album. It's a funny story about a shaggy dog that keeps on killing the narrator's chickens. It's an amusing cartoon of a song, wherein the narrator is threatening to send the dog to that big chicken house in the sky.

— John M. Alexander. The Man in Song: A Discographic Biography of Johnny Cash

According to the book The Best of Country Music, it is one of "the two most intentionally silly songs Jack Clement ever wrote", the other being "Flushed from the Bathroom of Your Heart."

No self-respecting fifth grader could fail to enjoy the joke lyrics to "Dirty Old Egg-Sucking Dog" or "Flushed from the Bathroom of Your Heart."

— Cecelia Tichi. Readin' country music: steel guitars, opry stars, and honky tonk bars

== Covers ==
Agnostic Front recorded a cover of the song, with altered lyrics, on their 1998 album Something's Gotta Give.
