= The General Lee (song) =

Song by Johnny Cash

Single by Johnny Cash

from the album The Dukes of Hazzard (soundtrack)
- A-side: "The General Lee"
- B-side: "Duelin' Dukes" (narration: Sorrell Booke)
- Released: 1982
- Genre: Country, country rock, outlaw country
- Length: 2:47
- Label: Scotti Bros. ZS5 02803
- Songwriters: Thom Bresh, J. R. Cash
- Producer: Johnny Cash

Johnny Cash singles chronology
"The Reverend Mr. Black" / "Chattanooga City Limit Sign" (1982)	"The General Lee" (1982)	"Georgia on a Fast Train" (1982)

Audio
- "The General Lee" on YouTube

"The General Lee" is a song co-written by and originally recorded by Johnny Cash for the 1982 soundtrack album to the television series The Dukes of Hazzard.

The General Lee was the name of the car the Dukes drove on the show.

Released as a single in 1982 (Scotti Bros. ZS5 02803, with "Duelin' Dukes" narrated by Sorrell Booke on the opposite side), "The General Lee" reached number 26 on U.S. Billboard's country chart.

== Track listing ==
7" single (Scotti Bros. Records ZS5 02803, 1982)
No.	Title	Writer(s)	Artist	Length
1.	"The General Lee"	T. Bresh, J. R. Cash	Johnny Cash	2:47
2.	"Duelin' Dukes"	J. R. Cash	Narrator: Sorrell Booke	2:52

== Charts ==
Chart (1982)	Peak position
US Hot Country Songs (Billboard)	26

== In popular culture ==
The song is featured in the game Grand Theft Auto V, where it can be heard on Rebel Radio.
