= I Will Dance with You =

Song by Johnny Cash

Single by Johnny Cash

from the album The Last Gunfighter Ballad
- A-side: "The Baron"
- Genre: Country, outlaw country, country rock
- Songwriter: Jack Wesley Routh
- Producer: Charlie Bragg

Music video
- "I Will Dance with You" on YouTube

"I Will Dance with You" is a song written by Jack Wesley Routh and originally released by Johnny Cash as the opening track on his 1977 studio album The Last Gunfighter Ballad.

In 1981, a new Johnny Cash song titled "The Baron" was coupled with "I Will Dance with You" for a single release.

== Karen Brooks and Johnny Cash duet version ==
"I Will Dance with You"

Single by Karen Brooks (in duet with Johnny Cash)

from the album Any Old Wind That Blows
- B-side: "Too Bad for Love"
- Released: 1985
- Genre: Country
- Label: Warner Bros. 7-28979
- Songwriter: Jack Wesley Routh
- Producer: Barry Beckett

In 1985 the song hit the country charts in a duet version by Karen Brooks and Johnny Cash.

=== Track listing ===
7" single (Warner Bros. Records 7-28979, 1985)
No.	Title	Writer(s)	Artist	Length
1.	"The Loving Gift"	Jack Wesley Routh	Karen Brooks (duet with Johnny Cash)	3:10
2.	"Too Bad for Love"	Karen Brooks, Randy Sharp	Karen Brooks	2:43

=== Charts ===
Chart (1985)	Peak position
US Hot Country Songs (Billboard)	45
