= Boom Chicka Boom =

Studio album by Johnny Cash
- Released: January 22, 1990
- Recorded: June 1987–Fall 1989
- Genre: Rockabilly; country
- Length: 36:00
- Label: Mercury
- Producer: Bob Moore

Johnny Cash chronology
Water from the Wells of Home (1988)	Boom Chicka Boom (1990)	Highwayman 2 (1990)

Singles from Boom Chicka Boom
- 1. "Farmer's Almanac" Released: March 1990; 2. "Cat's in the Cradle" Released: June 1990

Professional ratings
Review scores
Source	Rating
Allmusic	4/5 stars
Rolling Stone	4/5 stars
Spin	(favourable)
The Rolling Stone Album Guide	2.5/5 stars

Boom Chicka Boom is the 76th overall album by American country music singer Johnny Cash, released in 1990 on Mercury Records. The title refers to the sound that Cash's backing band, the Tennessee Three, were said to produce. It includes a cover of Harry Chapin's "Cat's in the Cradle", and a song written by Elvis Costello for Cash, "Hidden Shame". "Don't Go Near the Water" is a re-recorded version and its original had been recorded for Ragged Old Flag. It discusses the issue of pollution of the environment. In 2003, Mercury released Boom Chicka Boom paired with Johnny Cash is Coming to Town on a single compact disc, though the bonus track "Veteran's Day" was left off. "Farmer's Almanac" and "Cat's in the Cradle" were released as singles, but failed to chart; the album itself, however, reached No. 48 on the country charts. The album has backing vocals by Elvis Presley's old backing group The Jordanaires (who had also backed Cash on some of his earliest Columbia recordings in the late 1950s), and Cash's mother.

== Track listing ==
No.	Title	Writer(s)	Length
1.	"A Backstage Pass"	Johnny Cash	3:23
2.	"Cat's in the Cradle"	Harry Chapin, Sandy Chapin	3:18
3.	"Farmer's Almanac"	Johnny Cash	3:48
4.	"Don't Go Near the Water"	Johnny Cash	2:29
5.	"Family Bible"	Walt Breeland, Paul Buskirk, Claude Gray	2:49
6.	"Harley"	Michael Martin Murphey, Chick Rains	4:09
7.	"I Love You, Love You"	Johnny Cash	2:54
8.	"Hidden Shame"	Elvis Costello	3:59
9.	"Monteagle Mountain"	Richard McGibony	3:12
10.	"That's One You Owe Me"	Jim Elliott, Mark D. Sanders	3:01
11.	"Veteran's Day" (bonus track on the European CD release)	Tom Russell	2:58

== Personnel ==
- Johnny Cash - vocals, guitar
- W.S. Holland - drums
- Bob Moore, Roy Huskey, Jr. - bass guitar
- Joe Zinkan - upright bass
- Reggie Young, Billy Sanford, Jim Soldi - electric guitar
- Ray Edenton - acoustic guitar
- Hargus "Pig" Robbins, Earl Ball - piano
- The Jordanaires - background vocals
- Mrs. Carrie Cash (Johnny Cash's mother) - additional vocals on "Family Bible"

== Additional personnel ==
- Produced By: Bob Moore
- Recorded at Bradley's Barn in Mt. Juliet, Tennessee and Stargem Recording Studio in Nashville, Tennessee
- Mixed at Bradley's Barn
- Engineers: Bobby Bradley, Dennis Ritchie
- Assistant Engineer: Danny Dunkleberger
- Mastered by: Benny Quinn at Masterfonics, Inc. in Nashville, Tennessee
- Original CD Graphics: Barnes & Company
- Art Direction & Design: Bill Barnes
- Photography: Alan Messer
- Reissue CD Credits
- Supervised by: Andy McKaie
- Digitally Remastered by Suha Gur, universal Mastering - East
- Art Direction: Vartan
- Design: Mike Fink @ilevel
- Photo Research: Ryan Null
- Photos by: Slick Lawson and Alan Messer
- Production Coordination: Beth Stempel

== Charts ==
Album - Billboard (United States)

Year	Chart	Position
1990	Country Albums	48
