= Chattanooga City Limit Sign =

Song by Johnny Cash

"The Reverend Mr. Black / Chattanooga City Limit Sign"

Single by Johnny Cash

from the album The Baron
- A-side: "The Reverend Mr. Black"
- B-side: "Chattanooga City Limit Sign"
- Released: December 1981 or January 1982
- Genre: Country
- Label: Columbia 18-02669
- Songwriter: Bob Drawdy
- Producer: Billy Sherrill

Johnny Cash singles chronology
"Mobile Bay" (1981)	"The Reverend Mr. Black / Chattanooga City Limit Sign" (1981)	"The General Lee" (1982)

Audio
- "Chattanooga City Limit Sign" on YouTube

"Chattanooga City Limit Sign" is a song written by Bob Drawdy and originally recorded by Johnny Cash for his Billy Sherrill–produced 1981 album The Baron.

In December 1981 or January 1982, the song had a single release as the flip side to "The Reverend Mr. Black". U.S. Billboard's country chart listed the single as a double-sided hit.

== Track listing ==
7" single (Columbia 18-02669, December 1981 or January 1982)
No.	Title	Writer(s)	Length
1.	"The Reverend Mr. Black"	B. E. Wheeler, J. Peters	3:10
2.	"Chattanooga City Limit Sign"	B. Drawdy	3:51

== Charts ==
As a double A-side with "The Reverend Mr. Black"

Chart (1981)	Peak position
US Hot Country Songs (Billboard)	71
