= Rockabilly Blues =

Studio album by Johnny Cash
- Released: September 22, 1980
- Studios: Quadrafonic (Nashville, Tennessee)
- Genres: Country; country rock
- Length: 32:48
- Language: English
- Label: Columbia
- Producers: Earl Poole Ball; Jack Clement; Nick Lowe

Johnny Cash chronology
A Believer Sings the Truth (1979)	Rockabilly Blues (1980)	Classic Christmas (1980)

Singles from Rockabilly Blues
- 1. "Cold Lonesome Morning" Released: August 1980; 2. "The Last Time" Released: November 1980; 3. "Without Love" Released: January 1981

Rockabilly Blues is an album by American country singer Johnny Cash, released on Columbia Records in 1980. Highlights include "Cold Lonesome Morning," which had some minor chart success (No. 53 in the country charts), "Without Love," by his son-in-law, Nick Lowe, and a cover of the witty "The Twentieth Century Is Almost Over." The first two of the aforementioned songs were the only singles from the album, though "Without Love" hardly enjoyed any chart success, peaking at No. 78. "The Twentieth Century Is Almost Over" was re-recorded five years later by Cash and Waylon Jennings, Willie Nelson and Kris Kristofferson, collectively known as the Highwaymen, on their first album entitled Highwayman, though it was, in essence, a duet with Nelson.

== Critical reception ==
Professional ratings
Review scores
Source	Rating
AllMusic	3/5 stars
Billboard	(unrated)
Robert Christgau	B−

Robert Christgau deemed Rockabilly Blues "an honorable country album with some pretty good songs on it." The Globe and Mail concluded that the album "has more to do with traditional country music than it does hot country-rock." The Boston Globe opined that "best of all is Cash's long awaited discovery of John Prine ('The 20th Century Is Almost Over')."

== Track listing ==
Side one
No.	Title	Writer(s)	Producer(s)	Length
1.	"Cold Lonesome Morning"	J.R. Cash	Earl Poole Ball	3:21
2.	"Without Love"	Nick Lowe	Nick Lowe	2:26
3.	"W-O-M-A-N"	J.R. Cash	Earl Poole Ball	3:21
4.	"The Cowboy Who Started the Fight"	Billy Joe Shaver	Earl Poole Ball	3:46
5.	"The Twentieth Century Is Almost Over"	Steve Goodman, John Prine	Earl Poole Ball	3:38

Side two
No.	Title	Writer(s)	Producer(s)	Length
1.	"Rockabilly Blues (Texas 1955)"	J.R. Cash	Earl Poole Ball	3:18
2.	"The Last Time"	Kris Kristofferson	Earl Poole Ball	3:12
3.	"She's a Go-er"	J.R. Cash	Earl Poole Ball	2:28
4.	"It Ain't Nothing New Babe"	Billy Joe Shaver	Jack Clement	4:02
5.	"One Way Rider" (with June Carter Cash)	Rodney Crowell	Jack Clement	3:16

== Personnel ==
- Johnny Cash - vocals, rhythm guitar
- Bob Wootton, Pete Wade, Cliff Parker - electric guitar
- Martin Belmont, Jerry Hensley, Jack Routh, Marty Stuart, Eddy Shaver - guitar
- Jack Clement - dobro, acoustic guitar, producer
- Dave Kirby - acoustic guitar, guitar
- Jerry Hensley - electric, acoustic and rhythm guitar, dobro, harmony vocals
- Billy Joe Shaver - guitar, gut-string guitar
- Philip Donnelly - guitar
- Bobby Thompson - acoustic guitar, banjo
- Dave Edmunds - guitar, engineer
- W.S. Holland, Jerry Carrigan, Larrie Londin, Kenny Malone, Pete Thomas - drums
- Floyd Chance - upright bass
- Earl Poole Ball - electric and acoustic piano, producer
- Daniel Sarenana, John Willis - brass
- Joe Allen, Joe Osborn - electric bass
- Nick Lowe - electric bass, producer
- Shane Keister - Moog synthesizer, Prophet 5 synthesizer
- Terry McMillan - harmonica
- Irv Kane, Rex Peer - trombone on "One Way Rider"
- Don Sheffield, George Cunningham - trumpet on "One Way Rider"
- June Carter Cash - additional vocals on "One Way Rider"
- Charles Cochran - horn arrangement on "One Way Rider"

Production

- Album produced by Earl Poole Ball
- "Without Love" produced by Nick Lowe
- "It Ain't Nothing New Babe" and "One Way Rider" produced by Jack Clement
- Engineers: Gene Eichelberger at Quadrafonic Studio, Nashville, TN; Curt Allen at JMI Recording Studio, Nashville, TN; Dave Edmunds at U.K. Pro Studio, London, England
- Back-up Engineers: Willie Pevear, Barbara Cline at Quadraphonic Studio, Nashville TN
- Recorded at Quadraphonic Studio, JMI Recording Studio, U.K. Pro Studio
- Front Cover Photography: Leonard Kamsler
- Reissue Producer: Dave Nives
- Project Coordinator: Kajetan Koci
- Reissue Designer: Suzanne Ammon

== Chart performance ==
=== Album ===
Chart (1980)	Peak position
Canadian RPM Country Albums	23

=== Singles ===
Year	Single	Peak positions	
Year	Single	US Country	CAN Country
1980	"Cold Lonesome Morning"	53	74
1980	"The Last Time"	85	—
1981	"Without Love"	78	68
