= Port of Lonely Hearts =

Single by Johnny Cash and the Tennessee Two

from the album Sings Hank Williams
- A-side: "Port of Lonely Hearts" "Mean-Eyed Cat"
- Released: October 1960
- Genre: country
- Label: Sun 347
- Songwriter: Johnny Cash

Music video
- "Port of Lonely Hearts" (audio only) on YouTube

"Port of Lonely Hearts" is a song written and originally recorded by Johnny Cash.

The song was recorded by Cash at Sun Records in 1955. Sun released it as a single (Sun 347, with "Mean-Eyed Cat" on the opposite side) in October 1960 when Cash had already left the label for Columbia.

== Composition and background ==
According to C. Eric Banister's Johnny Cash FAQ: All That's Left to Know About the Man in Black,

"Port of Lonely Hearts" [...] offered an early glimpse at Cash's willingness to experiment with his sound by overdubbing a second vocal line, providing harmony as well as a call-and-response part. “Port of Lonely Hearts,” like several other songs from early sessions, would later be released after Cash had made his move to Columbia.

Cash also recorded a few songs about boats as a means of escape. Initially, in "Port of Lonely Hearts," the narrator is dejectedly waiting for his ship to come in, preferably with a girl on board. He's determined to wait as long as it takes for love to arrive so he can leave the port of lonely hearts with the one he loves.

— John M. Alexander. The Man in Song: A Discographic Biography of Johnny Cash
