= The Adventures of Johnny Cash =

Studio album by Johnny Cash
- Released: September 6, 1982
- Recorded: January 1981 – February 1982
- Studio: Cowboy Arms (Nashville, Tennessee)
- Genre: Country; outlaw country
- Length: 30:07
- Label: Columbia
- Producer: Jack Clement

Johnny Cash chronology
The Survivors (1982)	The Adventures of Johnny Cash (1982)	Johnny 99 (1983)

Singles from The Adventures of Johnny Cash
- 1. "Georgia on a Fast Train" Released: July 1982; 2. "Fair Weather Friends" Released: October 1982; 3. "We Must Believe in Magic" Released: January 1983

Professional ratings
Review scores
Source	Rating
AllMusic	2.5/5 stars
The Rolling Stone Album Guide	3/5 stars

The Adventures of Johnny Cash is an album by American country singer Johnny Cash, released on Columbia Records in 1982. The album was produced by Jack Clement.

"Georgia on a Fast Train" and "We Must Believe in Magic" were both released as singles with minor chart success: "Georgia on a Fast Train" got as high as #55 C&W while the latter peaked at #84 C&W.

== Track listing ==
No.	Title	Writer(s)	Length
1.	"Georgia on a Fast Train"	Billy Joe Shaver	2:34
2.	"John's"	Joe Allen	3:33
3.	"Fair Weather Friends"	Joe Allen, Johnny Cash	2:51
4.	"Paradise"	John Prine	3:10
5.	"We Must Believe in Magic"	Bob McDill, Allen Reynolds	2:28
6.	"Only Love"	Roger Cook, Sandy Mason Theoret, John Prine	3:18
7.	"Good Old American Guest"	Merle Haggard	3:20
8.	"I'll Cross Over Jordan Someday"	Peck Chandler	2:47
9.	"Sing a Song"	Tommy Cisco	2:51
10.	"Ain't Gonna Hobo No More"	Don Devaney	3:15

  - Note: Track 5 was cut by Crystal Gayle five years prior to Cash's version. Gayle's original version appears on the 1977 album of the same name.

== Personnel ==
- Johnny Cash – vocals, acoustic guitar
- Bob Wootton, Mike Elliot, Jerry Hensley, Jack Clement – guitar
- Marty Stuart – guitar, mandolin, photography
- John Hartford – fiddle, banjo
- Joe Allen – bass
- W.S. Holland, Kenny Malone – drums, percussion
- Earl Poole Ball, Charles Cochran – piano, keyboards
- Jack "Stack-a-Track" Grochmal – ukulele, engineer, mixing
- The Mike Elliot String Quartet – Lennie Haight, Mark Feldman – violin, Kristin Wilkinson – viola, John Catchings – cello
- June Carter Cash, Cindy Cash, Marty Stuart, Rachel Peer, Sandy Mason Theoret, Kathy Johnson, Joe Allen, Alan O'Bryant – backing vocals

== Charts ==
Singles - Billboard (United States)

Chart Debut/Year	Single	Chart	Position
August 1982	"Georgia on a Fast Train"	Country Singles	55
February 1983	"We Must Believe in Magic"	Country Singles	84
