= The Loving Gift =

Song by Johnny Cash and June Carter Cash

Single by Johnny Cash and June Carter Cash

from the album Any Old Wind That Blows
- B-side: "Help Me Make It Through the Night"
- Released: December 1972
- Genre: Country
- Label: Columbia 4-45758
- Songwriter: Kris Kristofferson

"The Loving Gift" is a song written by Kris Kristofferson and originally recorded by the duo of Johnny Cash and June Carter Cash.

Released in December 1972 as a single (Columbia 4-45758, with a cover of Kristofferson's "Help Me Make It Through the Night" on the opposite side) and also included on Johnny Cash's album Any Old Wind That Blows out on January 5 of the next year, the song reached number 27 on U.S. Billboard's country chart for the week of March 10, 1973.

== Track listing ==
7" single (Columbia 4-45758, 1972)
| No. | Title | Writer(s) | Length |
|---|---|---|---|
| 1. | "The Loving Gift" | K. Kristofferson | 2:13 |
| 2. | "Help Me Make It Through the Night" | K. Kristofferson | 2:56 |

== Charts ==
| Chart (1973) | Peak position |
|---|---|
| US Hot Country Songs (Billboard) | 27 |
