= Georgia on a Fast Train =

Song by Billy Joe Shaver

"I Been to Georgia on a Fast Train"

Single by Billy Joe Shaver

from the album Old Five and Dimers Like Me
- B-side: "Old Five and Dimers Like Me"
- Released: July 1973
- Recorded: June 1973
- Studio: Sound Spectrum Recordings, House Of Cash, Hendersonville, TN
- Genre: Country, country rock, outlaw country
- Label: Monument
- Songwriter: Billy Joe Shaver
- Producer: Kris Kristofferson

Audio
- "I Been to Georgia on a Fast Train" on YouTube

"Georgia on a Fast Train" (originally titled "I Been to Georgia on a Fast Train") is a song by Billy Joe Shaver from his debut 1973 album Old Five and Dimers Like Me.

Released as a single that year, it peaked at number 88 on U.S. Billboard's country chart.

In 1994, Shaver released this song as a single again, that time under the shortened title "Georgia on a Fast Train". The new version did not chart.

== Charts ==
Chart (1973)	Peak position
US Hot Country Songs (Billboard)	88

== Johnny Cash version ==
"Georgia on a Fast Train"

Single by Johnny Cash

from the album The Adventures of Johnny Cash
- B-side: "Sing a Song"
- Released: July 1982 or August 1982
- Genre: Country, country rock, outlaw country, rockabilly
- Length: 2:36
- Label: Columbia 18-03058
- Songwriter: Billy Joe Shaver
- Producer: Jack Clement

Johnny Cash singles chronology
"The General Lee" (1982)	"Georgia on a Fast Train" (1982)	"Fair Weather Friends" (1982)

Audio
- "Georgia on a Fast Train" on YouTube

Johhny Cash covered the song on his Jack Clement–produced 1982 album The Adventures of Johnny Cash. Released as the first of three singles from it, his version reached number 55 on U.S. Billboard's country chart for the week of September 4, 1982.

=== Track listing ===
7" single (Columbia 18-03058, 1982)
No.	Title	Writer(s)	Length
1.	"Georgia on a Fast Train"	B. J. Shaver	2:36
2.	"Sing a Song"	T. Cisco	2:55

=== Charts ===
Chart (1982)	Peak position
US Hot Country Songs (Billboard)	55
