= Rosanna's Going Wild =

Song by Johnny Cash

Single by Johnny Cash

from the album International Superstar
- A-side: "Rosanna's Going Wild" "Roll Call"
- Released: 1968
- Genre: Country
- Label: Columbia 4-44373
- Songwriters: June Carter, Helen Carter, Anita Carter
- Producer: Bob Johnston

Audio
- "Rosanna's Going Wild" on YouTube

"Rosanna's Going Wild" is a song written by June, Helen, and Anita Carter for Johnny Cash.

Cash released it as a single (Columbia 4-44373, with "Roll Call" on the opposite side) in November 1967. The song made it to number 2 on U.S. Billboard's country chart and to number 91 on the Hot 100.

Years later the song was included on Johnny Cash's album International Superstar (1972).

== Analysis ==
It was a cover of a song by The Carter Sisters. C. Eric Banister describes it in his Johnny Cash FAQ as a story of "a young woman who is out to experience life to the fullest." The flip side, "Roll Call", was about "an army platoon losing their final battle, culminating in the attendant roll call in the beyond."

Cash's four previous singles had only "flickered briefly on the country charts", and the success was completely unexpected:

A jaunty tear through the teenage rebellion of a young girl, the song was nowhere near his best work: He sounded drawn, sapped perhaps by his drug battles and a vigorous fall touring slate.

— Michael Streissguth. Johnny Cash at Folsom Prison: The Making of a Masterpiece, Revised and Updated

== Track listing ==
7" single (Columbia 4-44373, 1967)
No.	Title	Writer(s)	Length
1.	"Rosanna's Going Wild"	June Carter, Helen Carter, Anita Carter	1:54
2.	"Roll Call"	B. J. Carnahan	2:24

== Charts ==
Chart (1967–1968)	Peak position
Canadian RPM Country Tracks	1
US Billboard Hot 100	91
US Hot Country Songs (Billboard)	2
