= The Dukes of Hazzard (television soundtrack) =

Soundtrack album by various artists
- Released: 1982 (re-released 2005)
- Genres: Country, country rock, country pop, outlaw country, urban cowboy
- Label: Scotti Bros.

The Dukes of Hazzard is the original soundtrack from the television series The Dukes of Hazzard. It should not be confused with the motion picture soundtrack with almost the same name. Released originally by Scotti Brothers Records in 1982 then re-released in 2005 on compact disc, it includes the theme to the show and one of Schneider's best hits "In the Drivers Seat". Most of the cast performed a song for the soundtrack. Remastered producing by Rob Santos.

== Track listing ==
Song	Artist
1. Good Ol' Boys	Sorrell Booke and the Hazzard County Boys
2. The General Lee	Johnny Cash
3. Laughing All the Way to the Bank	Sorrell Booke and the Hazzard County Boys
4. Up on Cripple Creek	Tom Wopat
5. Cover Girl Eyes	Doug Kershaw and the Hazzard County Boys
6. In the Driver's Seat	John Schneider
7. Flash	James Best
8. Down Home American Girl	Catherine Bach
9. Duelin' Dukes	Sorrell Booke
10. Keep Between Them Ditches	Doug Kershaw and the Hazzard County Boys
11. Ballad of the General Lee	Doug Kershaw and the Hazzard County Boys
* Bonus Tracks	
12. Them Good Ol' Boys Are Bad	John Schneider
13. Mammas Don't Let Your Babies Grow Up to Be Cowboys	Waylon Jennings and Willie Nelson
14. Good Ol' Boys (TV Version but full)	Waylon Jennings
