= Johnny Cash Is Coming to Town =

Studio album by Johnny Cash
- Released: April 13, 1987
- Studio: Cowboy Arms (Nashville, Tennessee)
- Genre: Country; rockabilly
- Length: 32:37
- Label: Mercury
- Producer: Jack Clement

Johnny Cash chronology
Believe in Him (1986)	Johnny Cash Is Coming to Town (1987)	Classic Cash: Hall of Fame Series (1988)

Singles from Johnny Cash Is Coming to Town
- 1. "The Night Hank Williams Came to Town" Released: March 1987; 2. "Sixteen Tons" Released: June 1987; 3. "Let Him Roll" Released: September 1987; 4. "W. Lee O'Daniel (and the Light Crust Dough Boys)" Released: November 1987

Johnny Cash Is Coming to Town is the 73rd overall album by American country singer Johnny Cash, released in 1987, and his first for Mercury Records. It was re-released in 2003, paired with Boom Chicka Boom on a single CD. "Sixteen Tons" was previously a hit for Tennessee Ernie Ford, "The Big Light" is an Elvis Costello song from his album King of America, released the previous year and "Let Him Roll" is from Guy Clark's debut, Old No. 1. The album reached #36 on the country charts, while the only released single, "The Night Hank Williams Came to Town", peaked at #43.

"Ballad of Barbara" is a rerecording of a track that had been a hit single for Cash in the early 1970s. A number of tracks left over from the album's recording sessions would later surface on Cash's final Mercury album, The Mystery of Life, released in 1991.

Professional ratings
Review scores
Source	Rating
Allmusic	link
Robert Christgau	(B+) link
The Rolling Stone Album Guide	3/5 stars

== Track listing ==
No.	Title	Writer(s)	Length
1.	"The Big Light"	Elvis Costello	2:41
2.	"Ballad of Barbara"	Johnny Cash	4:21
3.	"I'd Rather Have You"	Cash	3:11
4.	"Let Him Roll"	Guy Clark	4:29
5.	"The Night Hank Williams Came to Town" (with Waylon Jennings)	Bobby Braddock, Charlie Williams	3:24
6.	"Sixteen Tons"	Merle Travis	2:46
7.	"Letters from Home"	J.C. Crowley, Jack Wesley Routh	3:21
8.	"W. Lee O'Daniel (and the Light Crust Dough Boys)"	James Talley	2:46
9.	"Heavy Metal (Don't Mean Rock and Roll to Me)"	Clark, Jim McBride	2:50
10.	"My Ship Will Sail"	Allen Reynolds	2:46

== Personnel ==
- Johnny Cash - vocals, guitar
- Waylon Jennings - vocals on "The Night Hank Williams Came to Town"
- Jim Soldi - lead and acoustic guitar, backing vocals
- Marty Stuart - lead and acoustic guitar, mandolin, backing vocals
- Pete Wade - lead guitar
- Bob Wootton - lead guitar
- Joey Miskulin - lead guitar, acoustic bass, backing vocals, keyboards
- Jack Clement - acoustic guitar, dobro, Jews harp, kazoo
- Mike Elliot - acoustic guitar
- Jimmy Tittle - electric bass, backing vocals
- Joe Allen, Michael Rhodes - electric bass
- Roy Huskey, Jr. - acoustic bass
- W.S. "Fluke" Holland - drums
- Kenny Malone - percussion
- Jack Hale, Jr. - horns, keyboards
- Bob Lewin - horns, keyboards
- Jay Patten - horns
- Earl Poole Ball - piano
- Charles Cochrane - piano, keyboards
- Lloyd Green - steel guitar
- Stuart Duncan, Mark O'Connor, Vassar Clements - fiddle
- Paco - harmonica
- June Carter and The Carter Family (June Carter Cash, Helen Carter, Anita Carter, Carlene Carter), Cinday Cash-Stuart, Bernard Peyton - backing vocals
- Charlie Williams - announcer voice on "The Night Hank Williams Came to Town"

== Additional personnel ==
- Produced by Jack Clement
- Assistant producer: David Ferguson
- Recorded at the Cowboy Arms Hotel and Recording Spa
- Engineers: Rich Adler (chief engineer and technical director), David Ferguson
- Mixing engineers: Dave Ferguson (all except "Heavy Metal...") and Rich Adler ("Heavy Metal...")
- Executive producer: Joey Miskulin
- Mastering: Glenn Meadows, Masterfonics
- Production manager: Coley Coleman
- Liner notes: John Lomax III
- Eyes courtesy: Dr. Marie Kelly, Dr. Burkett Nelson
- Photography: Slick Lawson
- Art design: Virginia Team
- Design: Jerry Joyner, Joe Rogers

== Charts ==
Album - Billboard (United States)

Chart (1987)	Peak position
Top Country Albums	36

Singles - Billboard (United States)

Year	Single	Peak positions
Year	Single	US Country
1987	"The Night Hank Williams Came to Town"	43
1987	"Sixteen Tons"	-
1987	"Let Him Roll"	-
1987	"W. Lee O'Daniel (and the Light Crust Dough Boys)"	72
