= It'll Be Her =

Song by Johnny Cash

Single by Johnny Cash

from the album Gone Girl
- A-side: "It'll Be Her" "It Comes and Goes"
- Released: December 1978
- Genre: country
- Label: Columbia 3-10855
- Songwriter: Johnny Cash
- Producer: Larry Butler

Johnny Cash singles chronology
"Gone Girl" (1978)	"It'll Be Her" (1978)	"I Will Rock and Roll with You" (1978)

Audio
- "It'll Be Her" on YouTube

"It'll Be Her" is a song written by Billy Ray Reynolds and recorded by Johnny Cash for his 1978 album Gone Girl.

Released in November 1978 as the album's second single (Columbia 3-10855, with "It Comes and Goes" on the opposite side), the song reached number 89 on U.S. Billboard's country chart.

== Track listing ==
7" single (Columbia 3-10855, 1978)
No.	Title	Writer(s)	Length
1.	"It'll Be Her"	B. R. Reynolds	3:05
2.	"It Comes and Goes"	J. R. Cash	2:30

== Charts ==
Chart (1978)	Peak position
US Hot Country Songs (Billboard)	89
