= Sugartime =

Single by the McGuire Sisters

from the album Sugartime
- B-side: "Banana Split"
- Released: December 1957
- Genre: Vocal pop
- Length: 2:31
- Label: Coral
- Songwriters: Charlie Phillips; Odis "Pop" Echols

The McGuire Sisters singles chronology
"Santa Claus is Comin' to Town" (1957)	"Sugartime" (1957)	"Ding Dong" (1958)

"Sugartime" is a popular song written by Charlie Phillips and Odis "Pop" Echols, and published in 1957. The biggest hit version was by the McGuire Sisters, whose recording of it topped the Most Played chart in February 1958. It was also the second number 1 Billboard single for the trio after 1954's "Sincerely". The song refers to the Jimmie Rodgers tune "Honeycomb", which had been recorded a few months earlier in 1957.

== Background and recording ==
The song was co-written in 1956 by Clovis, New Mexico, residents Charlie Phillips and musician and KCLV radio station owner Odis "Pop" Echols. Phillips took the song to Norman Petty, who scheduled a recording session at his Clovis recording studio that included Buddy Holly on guitar and Jerry Allison on drums. This country version of the song was released on Coral Records and was a hit in Texas and Mexico.

Petty suggested to Coral that they should do a pop version of the song with the McGuire Sisters, resulting in a number one hit for the singing trio in 1957 and one of the most successful singles of their career.

A version by Johnny Cash, culled from his Sun Records catalogue, briefly returned to the Cashbox country chart in 1961.

The chorus was sampled for the title song of the Bollywood movie Dil Deke Dekho.

The melody is remarkably similar to that of "I'm Daffy Over You", written by Chico Marx and Sol Violinsky, and performed by Marx in several films. The main melody is also reminiscent of Saint-Saens' Havanaise.

== Cover versions ==
- A recording by British singer Alma Cogan was a hit later in 1958.
- The McGuire Sisters themselves covered it in a twist arrangement in 1960. It was their last chart hit as a trio, bubbling under the Billboard Hot 100 at number 107.
- Alice Babs (Swedish lyrics by Eric Sandström)
- Lily Berglund, another Swedish version
- Linda McCartney, Reggae-version produced by Lee Perry
- Johnny Cash (on Now Here's Johnny Cash)
- Shigga Shay sampled it in "Shigga Morning", featuring Inch Chua.
- Bagel Bites co-opted the song for a jingle in a 1996 commercial titled "Pizza in the Morning".
- The Wilburn Brothers on the album Side by Side (Decca, 1958)
