= The Last Gunfighter Ballad =

Studio album by Johnny Cash
- Released: January 1977
- Recorded: February 21, 1975 – October 6, 1976
- Studio: House of Cash Studios (Hendersonville)
- Genre: Country; outlaw country
- Length: 30:23
- Language: English
- Label: Columbia
- Producer: Charlie Bragg; Johnny Cash

Johnny Cash chronology
One Piece at a Time (1976)	The Last Gunfighter Ballad (1977)	The Rambler (1977)

Singles from The Last Gunfighter Ballad
- 1. "The Last Gunfighter Ballad" Released: 1977

Professional ratings
Review scores
Source	Rating
AllMusic	2/5 stars

The Last Gunfighter Ballad is an album by American country singer Johnny Cash, released on Columbia Records in 1977. Notable tracks include the title track, "Far Side Banks of Jordan" and "That Silver Haired Daddy of Mine", the latter of which features Cash's brother Tommy Cash. The title track was the album's only single, reaching #38 on the country charts; it tells the tale of an aging gunslinger who finds himself unable to deal with the modern way of life.

"Ballad of Barbara" is a new recording of a song that had first appeared as the B-side of Cash's 1973 single "Praise the Lord and Pass the Soup", while "City Jail" is a studio version of a track first released on the live album På Österåker. "Far Side Banks of Jordan", a duet featuring Cash and his wife, June Carter Cash, is a remake of a track first recorded in 1975 for a planned gospel album that was recorded in full, but for reasons unknown was never released (the 1975 version of the song, along with the other tracks, would not be released until 2012). The song is noted for its lyrics which feature June pondering the possibility of dying before her husband (she would in fact die several months before Cash in 2003).

== Track listing ==
No.	Title	Writer(s)	Length
1.	"I Will Dance With You"	Jack Wesley Routh	2:49
2.	"The Last Gunfighter Ballad"	Guy Clark	2:48
3.	"Far Side Banks of Jordan" (with June Carter Cash)	Terry Smith	2:42
4.	"Ridin' on the Cotton Belt"	Cash	3:25
5.	"Give It Away"	Tom T. Hall	2:55
6.	"You're So Close to Me"	Mac Davis	2:50
7.	"City Jail"	Cash	3:56
8.	"Cindy, I Love You"	Cash	2:15
9.	"Ballad of Barbara" (with Tommy Cash)	Cash	3:49
10.	"Silver Haired Daddy of Mine"	Gene Autry, Jimmy Long	2:54

== Personnel ==
- Johnny Cash - vocals
- Bob Wootton, Jerry Hensley, Jack Routh - guitar
- Marshall Grant, Roy Goin, Mike Leech - bass
- WS Holland - drums
- Larry McCoy, Earl Poole Ball - piano
- Farrell Morris - percussion
- Tommy Cash - vocals
- June Carter Cash - vocals
- The Carter Family and Jan Howard - vocals

=== Additional personnel ===
- Produced by: Charlie Bragg and Don Davis
- Arranged by: Bill Walker
- Recorded at Sound Spectrum Recording, Inc. (House of Cash Studios)
- Engineers: Charlie Bragg, Roger Tucker, Danny Jones, Chuck Bragg
- Photography: Bill Barnes
- Liner Notes: Johnny Cash (as John D. (Deadeye) Cash)

== Charts ==
Album - Billboard (United States)

Year	Chart	Position
1977	Country Albums	29

Singles - Billboard (United States)

Year	Single	Chart	Position
1977	"The Last Gunfighter Ballad"	Country Singles	38
