= The Last Time (Johnny Cash song) =

Song by Johnny Cash

Single by Johnny Cash

from the album Rockabilly Blues
- B-side: "Rockabilly Blues (Texas 1955)"
- Released: 1980
- Genre: Country, outlaw country, urban cowboy
- Label: Columbia 11-11399
- Songwriter: Kris Kristofferson
- Producer: Earl Poole Ball

Johnny Cash singles chronology
"Cold Lonesome Morning" (1980)	"The Last Time" (1980)	"Without Love" (1981)

Audio
- "The Last Time" on YouTube

"The Last Time" is a song written by Kris Kristofferson and recorded by Johnny Cash for his 1980 album Rockabilly Blues.

Released in 1980 as a single (Columbia 11-11399, with "Rockabilly Blues (Texas 1955)" on the B-side) from that album, the song reached number 85 on U.S. Billboard's country chart for the week of December 6.

"The Last Time" was the first Kris Kristofferson Cash had recorded in six years. The way his voice slips into it, like a body into a comfortable chair, suggests he shouldn't have waited so long. (In fact, a few years prior, the two had discussed recording an album together, where Cash would sing Kristofferson songs, and Kristofferson Cash's, but the album never came to be.)

— C. Eric Banister. Johnny Cash FAQ: All That's Left to Know About the Man in Black

Kristofferson also recorded the song himself, his version appears on the 1981 album To the Bone.

== Track listing ==
7" single (Columbia 11-11399, 1980)
No.	Title	Writer(s)	Length
1.	"The Last Time"	K. Kristofferson	3:12
2.	"Rockabilly Blues (Texas 1955)"	J. R Cash	3:18

== Charts ==
Chart (1980)	Peak position
US Hot Country Songs (Billboard)	85
