= Mean-Eyed Cat =

Single by Johnny Cash and the Tennessee Two

from the album Johnny Cash Sings Hank Williams
- A-side: "Mean Eyed Cat" "Port of Lonely Hearts"
- Released: October 1960
- Recorded: July 1955
- Genre: Rockabilly
- Label: Sun 347
- Songwriter: Johnny Cash

Johnny Cash and the Tennessee Two singles chronology
"Going to Memphis" (1960)	"Mean-Eyed Cat" (1960)	"Girl in Saskatoon" (1960)

Music video
- "Mean-Eyed Cat" (audio only) on YouTube

"Mean-Eyed Cat" (or "Mean Eyed Cat") is a song written and originally recorded by Johnny Cash.

The song was recorded by Cash at Sun Records on July 30, 1955. Sun released it as a single (Sun 347, with "Port of Lonely Hearts" on the opposite side) in October 1960, which was the last Sun release by Cash as he left the label for Columbia a few years earlier.

Cash also made a completely revised cover of this song for his 1996 album Unchained.

== Content ==
"Mean Eyed Cat" is an all-out rockabilly rave-up about a fellow who gives his woman money to shop at the general store, just so she can go and spend it on "store-bought cat food for her mean eyed cat." The cat conceit is stretched a bit, since that's the only time it's used in the song. She ultimately leaves him with a "Dear John" note on her pillow as he heads to town to bring her back. Again, the train becomes a symbol of escape and freedom, as the hard-pressed woman catches an eastbound train.

— John M. Alexander. The Man in Song: A Discographic Biography of Johnny Cash

== Charts ==
Chart (1960)	Peak position
US Hot Country Songs (Billboard)	30
