= Johnny Cash and His Woman =

Studio album by Johnny Cash and June Carter Cash
- Released: September 3, 1973
- Genre: Country; folk
- Length: 28:31
- Label: Columbia
- Producer: Don Law

Johnny Cash chronology
The Gospel Road (1973)	Johnny Cash and His Woman (1973)	Ragged Old Flag (1974)

Singles from Johnny Cash and His Woman
- 1. "Allegheny" Released: August 24, 1973

Johnny Cash and His Woman is an album by American country singer Johnny Cash and features his wife, June Carter Cash. It was released on Columbia Records in December 1973. It is Johnny Cash's 46th overall album and it peaked at No. 32 on the country album charts, his lowest chart showing up to that point.

== Track listing ==
All tracks are duets by Johnny Cash and June Carter Cash except where noted.
No.	Title	Writer(s)	Length
1.	"The Color of Love"	Billy Edd Wheeler	2:45
2.	"Saturday Night in Hickman County" (Johnny Cash solo)	Johnny Cash	2:32
3.	"Allegheny"	Chris Gantry	3:31
4.	"Life Has Its Little Ups and Downs"	Margaret Ann Rich	2:36
5.	"Matthew 24 (Is Knocking at the Door)"	Johnny Cash	2:42
6.	"The City of New Orleans" (Johnny Cash solo)	Steve Goodman	3:41
7.	"Tony" (Johnny Cash solo)	D. C. Powers	3:28
8.	"The Pine Tree"	Billy Edd Wheeler	3:00
9.	"We're for Love"	Reba Hancock, M. S. Tubb	2:01
10.	"Godshine"	D. C. Powers	2:15

== Personnel ==
- Johnny Cash - vocals, guitar
- June Carter Cash - vocals
- Bob Wootton, Carl Perkins, David Jones - guitar
- Marshall Grant - bass
- WS Holland - drums
- Bill Walker, Jerry Whitehurst - piano, keyboards

Additional personnel

- Produced by Don Law Productions
- Arranged and conducted by Bill Walker
- Engineering: Charlie Bragg, Roger Tucker, Joey Watson,

== Charts ==
Album - Billboard (United States)

Year	Chart	Position
1973	Country Albums	32

Singles - Billboard (United States)

Year	Single	Chart	Position
1973	"Alleghany"	Country Singles	69
