= W. Lee O'Daniel (and the Light Crust Dough Boys) =

Song by Johnny Cash

Single by Johnny Cash

from the album Johnny Cash Is Coming to Town
- A-side: "Letters from Home"
- B-side: "W. Lee O'Daniel (and the Light Crust Dough Boys)"
- Released: November 1987 or December 1987
- Genre: Country
- Label: Mercury 870 010-7
- Songwriter: James Talley
- Producer: Jack Clement

Johnny Cash singles chronology
| "Let Him Roll" (1987) | "W. Lee O'Daniel (and the Light Crust Dough Boys)" (1987) | "Get Rhythm" (1988) |

Audio
- "W. Lee O'Daniel (and the Light Crust Dough Boys)" on YouTube

"W. Lee O'Daniel (and the Light Crust Dough Boys)" is a song written by James Talley and originally recorded by Johnny Cash for his Jack Clement–produced 1987 album Johnny Cash Is Coming to Town.

Released in late 1987 together with "Letters from Home" as the fourth and last single from the album, the song reached number 72 on U.S. Billboard's country chart for the week of December 26.

== Content ==
The song talks about a band called Light Crust Doughboys.

In the words of C. Eric Banister (Johnny Cash FAQ: All That's Left to Know About the Man in Black), even though it was a good song, it "probably led a lot of listeners wonder, 'Who?'", since the band it was about "hadn't been popular since the mid-1930s."

== Track listing ==
7" single (Mercury 870 010-7, 1987)
| No. | Title | Writer(s) | Length |
|---|---|---|---|
| 1. | "Letters from Home" | Jack Wesley Routh, John Charles Crowley | 3:18 |
| 2. | "W. Lee O'Daniel (and the Light Crust Dough Boys)" | James Talley | 2:45 |

== Charts ==
| Chart (1987) | Peak position |
|---|---|
| US Hot Country Songs (Billboard) | 72 |
