= The Baron (song) =

Song by Johnny Cash

Single by Johnny Cash

from the album The Baron
- B-side: "I Will Dance with You"
- Released: March 1981
- Studio: Columbia (Nashville, Tennessee)
- Genre: Country
- Label: Columbia
- Songwriters: Paul Richey, Jerry Taylor, Billy Sherrill
- Producer: Billy Sherrill

Johnny Cash singles chronology
"Without Love" (1981)	"The Baron" (1981)	"Mobile Bay" (1981)

Music video
- "The Baron" on YouTube

"The Baron" is a song originally recorded by Johnny Cash. It was released as a single in March 1981 and included on the album The Baron released in June of that year.

Released as a single (Columbia 11-60516, with "I Will Dance with You" on the B-side), the song reached number 10 on U.S. Billboard's country chart for the week of May 30, 1981.

In 1984, a film based on and featuring the song, The Baron and the Kid, was released.

== Track listing ==
7" single (Columbia 11-60516, 1981)
No.	Title	Writer(s)	Length
1.	"The Baron"	Paul Richey, Jerry Taylor, Billy Sherrill	3:36
2.	"I Will Dance with You"	Jack Routh	2:54

== Charts ==
Chart (1981)	Peak position
US Hot Country Songs (Billboard)	10
