= Down the Street to 301 =

Single by Johnny Cash

from the album Now Here's Johnny Cash
- A-side: "Down the Street to 301" "The Story of a Broken Heart"
- Released: June 1960
- Genre: Country, rockabilly, doo-wop, honky-tonk, pop
- Label: Sun 343
- Songwriter: Jack Clement

Johnny Cash singles chronology
"Second Honeymoon (song)" (1960)	"Down the Street to 301" (1960)	"Going to Memphis" (1960)

Music video
- "Down the Street to 301" (audio only) on YouTube

"Down the Street to 301" is a song originally recorded by Johnny Cash. It was written for him by Jack Clement.

The song was recorded by Cash on July 17, 1958 during his final session for Sun Records (or on May 15) and released as a single (Sun 343, with "The Story of a Broken Heart" on the opposite side) in June 1960.

== Background ==
According to John M. Alexander's book The Man in Song: A Discographic Biography of Johnny Cash, the song was written by Charlie Rich:

"Down the Street to 301" was the last track Cash recorded at Sun Studios, courtesy of Charlie Rich. It's a story about a boy who is dating the girl who lives at 301. It appears that they were aiming for a song, and a sound, similar to Cash's giant hit "Ballad of a Teenage Queen." It almost feels like a follow-up to that song, with its doo-wop harmonies and pop production.

— John M. Alexander. The Man in Song: A Discographic Biography of Johnny Cash

The song can be considered "a fitting finale to Cash's incredible Sun recording career".

== Charts ==
Chart (1960)	Peak position
US Billboard Hot 100	85
