= No Need to Worry =

Song by Johnny Cash and June Carter

Single by Johnny Cash and June Carter

from the album International Superstar
- B-side: "I'll Be Loving You"
- Released: September 1971
- Genre: Country
- Label: Columbia 4-45431
- Songwriters: S. J. Cooper, G. P. White

"No Need to Worry" is a song written by S. J. Cooper and G. P. White and originally recorded by the duo of Johnny Cash and June Carter.

Released in September 1971 as a single (Columbia 4-45431, with "I'll Be Loving You" on the opposite side), the song reached number 15 on U.S. Billboard's country chart for the week of October 23.

The track was later included on Cash's 1972 compilation album International Superstar.

== Track listing ==
7" single (Columbia 4-45431, 1971)
No.	Title	Writer(s)	Length
1.	"No Need to Worry"	S. J. Cooper, G. P. White	2:47
2.	"I'll Be Loving You"	J. R. Cash	2:08

== Charts ==
Chart (1971)	Peak position
US Hot Country Songs (Billboard)	15
