= Allegheny (song) =

Song by Johnny Cash and June Carter

Single by Johnny Cash and June Carter

from the album Johnny Cash and His Woman
- B-side: "We're for Love"
- Released: August 1973
- Genre: Country
- Label: Columbia 4-45929
- Songwriter: Chris Gantry

"Allegheny" is a song written and originally recorded by Chris Gantry.

Gantry included it on his 1970 album Motor Mouth and also released it as a single.

The song was covered by the duo Johnny Cash and June Carter. The cover was included on their 1973 album Johnny Cash and His Woman and also released as a single (Columbia 4-45929, with "We're for Love" from the same album on the opposite side), reaching number 69 on the U.S. Billboard's country chart for the week of November 17.

== Track listing ==
7" single (Columbia 4-45929, 1973)
No.	Title	Writer(s)	Length
1.	"Allegheny"	C. Gantry	3:27
2.	"We're for Love"	M. S. Tubb, C. Gantry	1:54

== Charts ==
Chart (1973)	Peak position
US Hot Country Songs (Billboard)	69
