= The Baron (album) =

Studio album by Johnny Cash
- Released: June 1, 1981
- Recorded: March 1981 except "The Baron" September 1980
- Studio: CBS Studios (Nashville, Tennessee)
- Genre: Country
- Length: 30:36
- Label: Columbia
- Producer: Billy Sherrill

Johnny Cash chronology
Classic Christmas (1980)	The Baron (1981)	Encore (1981)

Singles from The Baron
- 1. "The Baron" Released: March 1981; 2. "Mobile Bay" Released: July 1981; 3. "The Reverend Mr. Black" / "Chattanooga City Limit Sign" Released: November 1981

The Baron is an album by American country singer Johnny Cash, released on Columbia Records in 1981 (see 1981 in music). The title track was a top ten hit, and three singles in all — including "Mobile Bay" and "The Reverend Mr. Black" / "Chattanooga City Limit Sign" — were released, though the latter two were rather unsuccessful in the charts, peaking at No. 60 and No. 71.

Cash recorded the album with countrypolitan producer Billy Sherrill. Other sessions with him would be released on the 2014 album Out Among the Stars.

== Critical reception ==
Professional ratings
Review scores
Source	Rating
AllMusic	2/5 stars
The Rolling Stone Album Guide	3/5 stars

The Boston Globe wrote: "That half of the songs are partly spoken, sometimes over syrupy strings, adds to the embarrassment."

== Track listing ==
No.	Title	Writer(s)	Length
1.	"The Baron"	Paul Richey, Billy Sherrill, Jerry Taylor	3:37
2.	"Mobile Bay"	David Kirby, Curly Putman	3:01
3.	"(I Learned) The Hard Way"	Jerry Lynn Lansdowne	2:59
4.	"Ceiling, Four Walls and a Floor"	Tom T. Hall	2:40
5.	"Hey, Hey, Train"	Marty Stuart	2:42
6.	"The Reverend Mr. Black / Lonesome Valley (Medley)"	Jerry Leiber, Mike Stoller, Billy Edd Wheeler / Jed Peters	3:11
7.	"The Blues Keep Getting Bluer"	Ron Reynolds	2:34
8.	"Chattanooga City Limit Sign"	Robert Rhett Drawdy	3:52
9.	"Thanks to You"	Jerry Lynn Lansdowne	2:29
10.	"Greatest Love Affair"	Mack David, Billy Sherrill	3:31

== Personnel ==
- Johnny Cash – vocals, guitar
- Pete Wade, Phil Baugh, Terry Jacks, Billy Sanford, Pete Bordonali – guitar
- Marty Stuart – guitar, fiddle, arrangements
- Pete Drake, Weldon Myrick – steel guitar
- Hargus "Pig" Robbins, Bobby Wood – piano
- Bobby Emmons – keyboards
- Terry McMillan, Charlie McCoy – harmonica
- Bob Wray – bass
- Jerry Carrigan, Kenny Malone, Jerry Kroon – drums
- Lea Jane Berinati, Millie Forrest, Janie Fricke, The Jordanaires, Millie Kirkham, Louis Nunely, Gordon Stoker, Hurshel Wiginton – background vocals
- Bill McElhiney – string arrangements

Technical

- Ron Reynolds – engineer
- Bill Johnson – sleeve design
- Slick Lawson – photography

== Chart performance ==
=== Album ===
Chart (1981)	Peak position
U.S. Billboard Top Country Albums	24
U.S. Billboard 200	201

=== Singles ===
Year	Single	Peak positions	
Year	Single	US Country	CAN Country
1981	"The Baron"	10	6
1981	"Mobile Bay"	60	—
1982	"The Reverend Mr. Black" / "Chattanooga City Limit Sign"	71	—
1982	"The Reverend Mr. Black" / "Chattanooga City Limit Sign"	71 (flip)	—
