= Everybody Loves a Nut =

Studio album by Johnny Cash
- Released: May 2, 1966
- Recorded: March 12, 1965–January 29, 1966
- Genre: Country; novelty
- Length: 29:51
- Label: Columbia
- Producer: Don Law; Frank Jones

Johnny Cash chronology
Johnny Cash Sings the Ballads of the True West (1965)	Everybody Loves a Nut (1966)	Happiness Is You (1966)

Singles from Everybody Loves a Nut
- 1. "The One on the Right Is on the Left" Released: January 17, 1966; 2. "Everybody Loves a Nut" Released: May 31, 1966; 3. "Boa Constrictor" Released: August 8, 1966

Professional ratings
Review scores
Source	Rating
AllMusic	link
Record Mirror	3/5 stars

Everybody Loves a Nut is the twenty-third album by American country singer Johnny Cash, released by Columbia Records in the United States in 1966 (see 1966 in music). The album consists largely of humorous novelty songs. The album's cover art was created by Jack Davis.

Cash would reprise a number of the tracks on this album in later venues such as TV performances, and live versions of "Dirty Old Egg-Sucking Dog" and "Joe Bean" would be featured on his later live album At Folsom Prison. On the sixth episode of his ABC TV series The Johnny Cash Show, he performed a version of the title track with musical guest The Monkees. "Please Don't Play Red River Valley" would also later be performed by Cash on the series as a musical comedy routine with his wife, June Carter Cash. Cash also performed "Dirty Old Egg-Sucking Dog" a decade later during an appearance on The Muppet Show.

"The Singing Star's Queen" features lyrics poking fun at Cash's friend and fellow performer Waylon Jennings. "Joe Bean" incorporates the lyrics and melody of "Happy Birthday to You".

== Track listing ==
No.	Title	Writer(s)	Length
1.	"Everybody Loves a Nut"	Jack Clement	2:04
2.	"The One on the Right Is on the Left"	Clement	2:46
3.	"A Cup of Coffee"	Ramblin' Jack Elliot	4:40
4.	"The Bug That Tried to Crawl Around the World"	Cash	2:54
5.	"The Singing Star's Queen"	Jackson King, Bill Mack	2:55
6.	"Austin Prison"	Cash	2:06
7.	"Dirty Old Egg-Sucking Dog"	Clement	2:05
8.	"Take Me Home"	Clement, Allen Reynolds	2:37
9.	"Please Don't Play Red River Valley"	Cash	2:54
10.	"Boa Constrictor"	Shel Silverstein	1:45
11.	"Joe Bean"	Bud Freeman, Leon Pober	3:05
Total length:			29:41

== Personnel ==
The release does not credit musicians, but the personnel were:

- Johnny Cash - vocals, guitar, harmonica (track 4)
- Luther Perkins - guitar
- Bob Johnson - guitar (track 4), 5-string lute (track 9), 5-string banjo (track 3)
- Marshall Grant - bass
- W.S. Holland - drums
- Del Wood - piano (tracks 1, 5, 9–11)
- Jack Elliott - yodel (track 3)
- Norman Blake - dobro (on track 8)
- The Carter Family - backing vocals

== Use in other media ==
- The song "Dirty Old Egg-Sucking Dog" was used in a 2012 commercial for the Volkswagen Jetta.

== Charts ==
Album - Billboard (United States)

Year	Chart	Position
1966	Billboard Top LPs	88

Album - UK Charts

Year	Chart	Position
1966	Top Albums	28

'Singles - Billboard (United States)

Year	Single	Chart	Position
1966	"The One on the Right is on the Left"	Country Singles	2
1966	"The One on the Right is on the Left"	Pop Singles	46
1966	"Everybody Loves a Nut"	Country Singles	17
1966	"Everybody Loves a Nut"	Pop Singles	96
1966	"Boa Constrictor"	Country Singles	39
