= Song of the Patriot =

Song by Johnny Cash

Single by Johnny Cash

from the album Encore
- B-side: "She's a Go-er"
- Released: 1980
- Genre: Country
- Label: Columbia 1-11283
- Songwriters: Marty Robbins, Shirl Milete
- Producer: Earl Ball

Johnny Cash singles chronology
"Bull Rider" (1980)	"Song of the Patriot" (1980)	"Cold Lonesome Morning" (1980)

Audio
- "Song of the Patriot" on YouTube

"Song of the Patriot" is a song written by Marty Robbins and Shirl Milete and originally recorded and released by Johnny Cash (with Marty Robbins providing vocal harmony).

Released in 1980 as a single (Columbia 1-11283, with "She's a Go-er" on the B-side), the song reached number 54 on U.S. Billboard's country chart for the week of July 5.

The song was included on Cash's 1981 compilation album Encore.

== Track listing ==
7" single (Columbia 1-11283, 1980)
No.	Title	Writer(s)	Length
1.	"Song of the Patriot"	M. Robbins, S. Milete	3:27
2.	"She's a Go-er"	J. R. Cash	2:57

== Charts ==
Chart (1980)	Peak position
US Hot Country Songs (Billboard)	54
