= Ragged Old Flag (song) =

1974 song by Johnny Cash

- Portuguese release picture sleeve

Single by Johnny Cash

from the album Ragged Old Flag
- Released: March 19, 1974
- Genre: Country
- Length: 3:08
- Label: Columbia
- Songwriter: Johnny Cash
- Producers: Johnny Cash, Charlie Bragg

Johnny Cash singles chronology
| "Orleans Parish Prison" (1974) | "Ragged Old Flag" (1974) | "The Junkie and the Juicehead, Minus Me" (1974) |

"Ragged Old Flag" is a song by American country music artist Johnny Cash from the 1974 album of the same name.

== Background ==
"Ragged Old Flag" was written in 1974 while Cash was in Binghamton, New York, during a time of political turbulence in the United States that had forced the resignation of President Richard Nixon during the Watergate scandal. Although Cash had publicly supported Nixon's candidacy, he had started to question the wisdom of Nixon-era policies concerning the Vietnam War. He wrote "Ragged Old Flag" to "reaffirm faith in the country and the goodness of the American people."

The song tells a story of an old man in a town square describing, to a visitor who was critical of how the flag looked, what the flag and America have been through together. "Ragged Old Flag" is typical of Cash's particular style of patriotism characterized by his appreciation for the land, people and complexities of the United States.

== Critical reception ==
Although some considered the song too jingoistic and sentimental, it was largely popular with Cash's audience. Despite its popularity during live performances, its success was short-lived and the song only reached number 31 on country music charts. It has been contrasted to country songs that espoused a more black and white view of patriotism such as Merle Haggard's "Okie From Muskogee" and "The Fightin' Side of Me". The song's popularity has increased after the September 11 attacks.

Frye Gaillard has described the song as a "poignant pledge of allegiance". The Sunday Herald has described it as "a defiant tribute to the stars and stripes". It has also been described as an "anti-flag burning" song.

== Live performances ==
At the first Americana Music Awards in September 2002, Cash added references to Operation Desert Storm and Afghanistan. During live performances, Cash usually introduced the song with the following:

"I thank God for all the freedom we have in this country, I cherish them and treasure them - even the right to burn the flag. We also got the right to bear arms and if you burn my flag - I'll shoot you. But I'll shoot you with a lot of love, like a good American".

"Ragged Old Flag" is recited at events around the country. It has been played by the West Point Band, and recited by various veterans groups at events on Veterans Day and the 4th of July. The Cash version is a tradition on Fox NFL Sunday pregame broadcasts of the Super Bowl.
