= Farmer's Almanac (song) =

Song by Johnny Cash

Single by Johnny Cash

from the album Boom Chicka Boom
- B-side: "I Shall Be Free"
- Released: March 1990
- Genre: Country
- Label: Mercury
- Producer: Bob Moore

Audio
- "Farmer's Almanac" on YouTube

"Farmer's Almanac" is a song written and originally recorded by Johnny Cash for his 1990 album Boom Chicka Boom.

Released in March 1990 as a single from that album, the song entered U.S. Billboard's country airplay chart for one week at number 85.

== Track listing ==
7" cassette single (Mercury 876 428-4, 1990)
No.	Title	Writer(s)	Length
1.	"Farmer's Almanac"	John R. Cash	3:47
2.	"I Shall Be Free"	John R. Cash	3:26

== Charts ==
Chart (1990)	Peak position
US Country Airplay (Billboard)	85
