= The Johnny Cash Family Christmas =

Studio album by Johnny Cash
- Released: December 4, 1972
- Recorded: 1972
- Genre: Christmas; country
- Length: 38:20
- Label: Columbia
- Producer: Larry Butler

Johnny Cash chronology
America: A 200-Year Salute in Story and Song (1972)	The Johnny Cash Family Christmas (1972)	International Superstar (1972)

The Johnny Cash Family Christmas is the 41st overall and second Christmas album by country singer Johnny Cash, released on Columbia Records in 1972. It is his second Christmas album, the first one being the 1963 release entitled The Christmas Spirit. The album includes less original Cash material than its predecessor and contains narrations and dialogue featuring his family and friends, between tracks. In all, three songs were written or co-written by Cash, while two, "Christmas as I Knew It" and "Silent Night", had been featured on The Christmas Spirit ("Silent Night" would, in fact, be featured on all four Johnny Cash Christmas albums). June Carter Cash, Marshall Grant, Tommy Cash, Harold Reid, Larry Butler (who was both Cash's piano player and record producer at this time), Maybelle Carter, Anita Carter, Carl Perkins and Lew DeWitt are among those featured on the album.

Professional ratings
Review scores
Source	Rating
Allmusic	2.5/5 stars

== Track listing ==
No.	Title	Writer(s)	Length
1.	"King of Love" (featuring the Statler Brothers and the Carter Family)	Harold Reid	5:25
2.	"Jingle Bells"	James Pierpont	3:22
3.	"That Christmasy Feeling" (featuring Tommy Cash)	Tommy Cash, Jimmy Peppers	3:28
4.	"My Merry Christmas Song"/"Merry Christmas Mary" (featuring Larry Butler)	Larry Butler	5:09
5.	"Christmas Time's A-Coming"	Tex Logan	4:10
6.	"Christmas With You" (featuring June Carter Cash)	Johnny Cash	2:45
7.	"Christmas as I Knew It"	June Carter Cash, Jan Howard	3:16
8.	"When You're Twenty-One" (featuring Carl Perkins)	Carl Perkins	3:03
9.	"An Old Fashioned Tree" (featuring Lew DeWitt)	Cordelia Pearl Williams	1:57
10.	"Silent Night"	Franz Gruber, Joseph Mohr	2:00

== Personnel ==
- Johnny Cash – vocals, actor, guitar
- Marshall Grant – bass, actor
- WS Holland – drums
- Bob Wootton – electric guitar
- Carl Perkins – vocals, actor, electric guitar
- Ray Edenton, Jerry Hensley, Jimmy Young – guitar
- Norman Blake – guitar, banjo
- Wayne Grey – mandolin
- Charles Cochrane – piano
- Larry Butler – keyboards, actor
- Gary Gorsett – drums
- Farrell Morris – percussion
- The Carter Family – vocals
- The Statler Brothers – vocals
- June Carter, Tommy Cash, Harold Reid, Maybelle Carter, Anita Carter, Lew DeWitt – vocals, actors

Technical

- Charlie Bragg, Mike Figlio, Roger Tucker – engineer
- Bill Barnes – art direction
- Mabey Trousdell – cover illustration
