= We Must Believe in Magic (song) =

Song by Crystal Gayle

Song by Crystal Gayle

from the album We Must Believe in Magic
- Released: 1977
- Genre: Country
- Songwriters: Allen Reynolds, Bob McDill

Audio
- "We Must Believe in Magic" on YouTube

"We Must Believe in Magic" is a song written by Allen Reynolds and Bob McDill and originally released by Crystal Gayle on her fourth studio album We Must Believe in Magic (1977).

In 1978, it was covered by Jack Clement on his album All I Want to Do in Life.

In his book on Johnny Cash, who recorded this song on a Jack Clement–produced album in the 1980s, John M. Alexander describes "We Must Believe in Magic" as a "whimsical piece of sound advice to hold on to our ability to always believe in magic and the guiding hand."

The metaphorical ship bound for Alpha Centauri is filled with a crew of "dreamers and poets and clowns." And that's essentially how [Johnny] Cash and [Jack] Clement viewed themselves. They were the dreamers who believed in the music and, ultimately, had the universe at their command. [Allen] Reynolds recalls that the song was about Jack [Clement] and the label they started together, J-M-I Records. When he and McDill first wrote it they called it "The Company Song." And the magic appears to have worked because J-M-I achieved success when they released the first two Don Williams albums.

— John M. Alexander. The Man in Song: A Discographic Biography of Johnny Cash

== Johnny Cash version ==
"We Must Believe in Magic"

Single by Johnny Cash

from the album The Adventures of Johnny Cash
- B-side: "I'll Cross over Jordan Someday"
- Released: January 1983
- Genre: Country
- Label: Columbia 38-03524
- Songwriters: Allen Reynolds, Bob McDill
- Producer: Jack Clement

Johnny Cash singles chronology
"Fair Weather Friends" (1982)	"We Must Believe in Magic" (1983)	"I'm Ragged but I'm Right" (1983)

Audio
- "We Must Believe in Magic" on YouTube

Johnny Cash covered the song on his Jack Clement–produced 1982 album The Adventures of Johnny Cash.

Released as the last of three singles from it, his version reached number 84 on U.S. Billboard's country chart for the week of February 26, 1983.

=== Track listing ===
7" single (Columbia 38-03524, 1983)
No.	Title	Writer(s)	Length
1.	"We Must Believe in Magic"	A. Reynolds, B. McDill	2:32
2.	"I'll Cross over Jordan Someday"	P. Chandler	2:53

=== Charts ===
Chart (1983)	Peak position
US Hot Country Songs (Billboard)	84
