= The Story of a Broken Heart =

Single by Johnny Cash

from the album Now Here's Johnny Cash
- A-side: "The Story of a Broken Heart" "Down the Street to 301"
- Released: June 1960
- Genre: Country, honky-tonk
- Label: Sun 343
- Songwriter: Tommy Blake or Sam Phillips

Music video
- "The Story of a Broken Heart" (audio only) on YouTube

"The Story of a Broken Heart" (or "Story of a Broken Heart") is a song originally recorded by Johnny Cash. It was written for him by Tommy Blake or Sam Phillips.

The song was recorded by Cash at Sun Records in May 1958. and released as a single (Sun 343, with "Down the Street to 301" on the opposite side) in June 1960.

== Background ==
"Story of a Broken Heart" proved to be yet another first-rate Cash performance on a lovelorn lament with a rare writer's credit by Sam Phillips. The song tells of the singer's dreading the coming of spring, when wedding bells will be ringing for his loved one. He's left with only his memories of when they were together. The ultimate heartache comes when his former love asks him to give her away in marriage.

— John M. Alexander. The Man in Song: A Discographic Biography of Johnny Cash

== Charts ==
Chart (1960)	Peak position
US Bubbling Under Hot 100 (Billboard)	107
