= Old Time Feeling =

Song by Johnny Cash and June Carter Cash

Single by Johnny Cash and June Carter Cash

from the album Greatest Hits, Vol. 3
- B-side: "Far Side Banks of Jordan"
- Released: October 1976
- Genre: Country
- Label: Columbia 3-10436
- Songwriters: Tom Jans, Will Jennings

"Old Time Feeling" is a song written by Tom Jans and Will Jennings and originally released by Tom Jans on the album Tom Jans (1974).

In 1976 the song was recorded by the duo of Johnny Cash and June Carter Cash. Released in October 1976 as a single (Columbia 3-10436, with "Far Side Banks of Jordan" on the opposite side), the song reached number 26 on U.S. Billboard's country chart for the week of March 10, 1973.

The song was later included on Cash's 1978 compilation Greatest Hits, Vol. 3.

== Track listing ==
7" single (Columbia 3-10436, 1976)
No.	Title	Writer(s)	Length
1.	"Old Time Feeling"	T. Jans, W. Jennings	2:47
2.	"Far Side Banks of Jordan"	T. Smith	2:40

== Charts ==
Chart (1976)	Peak position
US Hot Country Songs (Billboard)	26
