= The Night Hank Williams Came to Town =

Song by Johnny Cash

Single by Johnny Cash

from the album Johnny Cash Is Coming to Town
- B-side: "I'd Rather Have You"
- Released: 1987
- Studio: Cowboy Arms (Nashville, Tennessee)
- Genre: Country
- Label: Mercury 888 459-7
- Songwriters: Bobby Braddock, Charlie Williams
- Producer: Jack Clement

Johnny Cash singles chronology
"I'm Leaving Now" (1985)	"The Night Hank Williams Came to Town" (1987)	"Sixteen Tons" (1987)

Audio
- "The Night Hank Williams Came to Town" on YouTube

"The Night Hank Williams Came to Town" is a song written by Bobby Braddock and Charlie Williams and originally recorded by Johnny Cash and Waylon Jennings for Cash's 1987 album Johnny Cash Is Coming to Town.

Released in March 1987 as the lead single from the album, the song reached number 43 on U.S. Billboard's country chart for the week of May 9.

== Content ==
The song talks about Hank Williams giving a concert on October 15, 1951 (known from the lyrics "I Love Lucy debuted on TV"). In the words of C. Eric Banister, Cash and Jennings sing "of the excitement that accompanied an appearance by Williams" and of "the memories they'll always have of him."

== Track listing ==
7" single (Mercury 888 459-7, 1987)
No.	Title	Writer(s)	Length
1.	"The Night Hank Williams Came to Town"	Bobby Braddock, Charlie Williams	3:23
2.	"I'd Rather Have You"	John R. Cash	3:12

== Charts ==
Chart (1987)	Peak position
US Hot Country Songs (Billboard)	43
