= It's All Over (Johnny Cash song) =

Song by Johnny Cash

Single by Johnny Cash and the Tennessee Three

from the album Greatest Hits, Vol. 3
- B-side: "Ridin' on the Cotton Belt"
- Released: September 1976
- Genre: Country
- Label: Columbia 3-10424
- Songwriter: J. R. Cash
- Producers: Johnny Cash, Charlie Bragg

Johnny Cash and the Tennessee Three singles chronology
"Sold Out of Flagpoles" (1976)	"It's All Over" (1976)	"The Last Gunfighter Ballad" (1977)

Audio
- "It's All Over" on YouTube

"It's All Over" is a song written and originally recorded by Johnny Cash.

Released in September 1976 as a single (Columbia 3-10424, with "Ridin' on the Cotton Belt" on the B-side), the song reached number 41 on U.S. Billboard's country chart for the week of November 27.

Later the song was included on the Cash album Greatest Hits, Vol. 3 (1978).

== Track listing ==
7" single (Columbia 3-10424, 1976)
No.	Title	Writer(s)	Length
1.	"It's All Over"	J. R. Cash	1:55
2.	"Ridin' on the Cotton Belt"	J. R. Cash	2:52

== Charts ==
Chart (1976)	Peak position
US Hot Country Songs (Billboard)	41
