= Charlie Phillips (singer) =

American country music singer-songwriter (born 1937)

- Born: July 2, 1937 (age 87); Clovis, New Mexico
- Origin: Nashville, Tennessee
- Genres: Country
- Occupation: Singer
- Instrument: Vocals
- Years active: 1962-1963
- Labels: Columbia

Charlie Phillips (born July 2, 1937) is an American country music singer and songwriter. Phillips began singing for producer Norman Petty as a teenager, and had musical backing from Buddy Holly on some of his first recordings. Coral records released "One Faded Rose" and "Be My Bride". The B-side to "One Faded Rose" was "Sugartime", later a hit for the McGuire Sisters. Phillips later signed with Columbia Records. His first Columbia single, "I Guess I'll Never Learn", made number 9 on the Hot Country Songs charts. Phillips later left Columbia over dissatisfaction with his content, and recorded a demonstration recording for "Welcome to My World", later a hit for Jim Reeves. He also cut "The Big Ball Is in Cowtown" for Longhorn Records, and then "Souvenirs of Sorrow" for Reprise Records, but the latter was withdrawn when Reprise exited the country music market. Phillips then worked as a radio DJ and recorded material for a country album with Norman Petty, but the album was cancelled after Petty's death. Phillips continued to perform in the West Texas area with his band "The Sugartimers" into the 2000s.

== Discography ==
Year	Single	Peak positions
Year	Single	US Country
1962	"I Guess I'll Never Learn"	9
1963	"This Is the House"	30
