= Lady (Johnny Cash song) =

Song by Johnny Cash

Single by Johnny Cash

from the album The Rambler
- B-side: "Hit the Road and Go"
- Released: 1977
- Genre: Country
- Label: Columbia 3-10587
- Songwriter: Johnny Cash
- Producers: Charlie Bragg, Jack Routh

Johnny Cash singles chronology
"The Last Gunfighter Ballad" (1976)	"Lady" (1977)	"After the Ball" (1977)

Audio
- "Lady" on YouTube

"Lady" is a song written by Johnny Cash and originally recorded by him for his 1977 album The Rambler.

Released in the summer of 1977 as a single (Columbia 3-10587, with "Hit the Road and Go" on the B-side), the song reached number 46 on U.S. Billboard's country chart for the week of September 17.

== Track listing ==
7" single (Columbia 3-10587, 1977)
No.	Title	Writer(s)	Length
1.	"Lady"	J. R. Cash	3:09
2.	"Hit the Road and Go"	J. R. Cash	2:26

== Charts ==
Chart (1977)	Peak position
US Hot Country Songs (Billboard)	46
