= The Rambler (album) =

Studio album by Johnny Cash
- Released: June 27, 1977
- Studio: Sound Spectrum
- Genre: Country
- Length: 37:28
- Label: Columbia
- Producers: Charlie Bragg; Jack Routh; Johnny Cash

Johnny Cash chronology
| The Last Gunfighter Ballad (1977) | The Rambler (1977) | I Would Like to See You Again (1978) |

Singles from The Rambler
- 1. "Lady" Released: 1977; 2. "After the Ball" Released: 1977

Professional ratings
Review scores
| Source | Rating |
|---|---|
| AllMusic | 2/5 stars |
| Music Week | 3/4 stars |
| The Rolling Stone Album Guide | 4/5 stars |

The Rambler is an album by American country singer Johnny Cash, released in 1977 on Columbia Records. A concept album about travelling, its songs, in between, include dialogue between Cash and hitchhikers picked up or other people he meets during the album's cross-country trip. It is the last, and one of the few Johnny Cash albums to only feature songs written by Cash himself. It is also his last non-religious concept album, and was included on the Bear Family box set Come Along and Ride This Train. The Rambler reached No. 31 on the country album charts; the two singles, "Lady" and "After the Ball", had minor chart success.

== Track listing ==
All songs by Johnny Cash

| No. | Title | Length |
|---|---|---|
| 1. | "Hit the Road and Go" | 2:35 |
| 2. | "Dialogue #1" | 2:33 |
| 3. | "If It Wasn't for the Wabash River" | 2:09 |
| 4. | "Dialogue #2" | 2:22 |
| 5. | "Lady" | 2:48 |
| 6. | "Dialogue #3 (Background: It's All Over)" | 2:27 |
| 7. | "After the Ball" | 2:48 |
| 8. | "Dialogue #4" | 2:02 |
| 9. | "No Earthly Good" | 2:45 |
| 10. | "Dialogue #5" | 1:51 |
| 11. | "A Wednesday Car" | 2:12 |
| 12. | "Dialogue #6" | 0:55 |
| 13. | "My Cowboy's Last Ride" | 2:29 |
| 14. | "Dialogue #7" | 2:48 |
| 15. | "Calilou" | 3:20 |
| 16. | "Dialogue #8" | 1:24 |

== Personnel ==
- Johnny Cash – vocals, guitar
- Bob Wootton, Jerry Hensley – electric guitar
- Ray Edenton, Jack Routh – flat top guitar
- Marshall Grant – bass guitar
- W.S. Holland – drums
- Earl Ball – piano
- Mark Morris – percussion
- Michael Bacon – cello
- Cam Mullins – string arrangements
- Written and directed by Johnny Cash

Technical

- Charlie Bragg, Jack Routh, Johnny Cash – producer
- Charlie Bragg, Chuck Bragg, Ed Hudson, Roger Tucker – engineer
- Jerry Baker – recording
- John Berg, Johnny Cash – photography

Actors

- Johnny Cash – The Rambler
- Jack Routh – The Fisherman
- Kathleen Brimm – The Cowgirl
- Carlene Routh, Rosanne Cash – Bargirls

== Charts ==
Album - Billboard (United States)

| Year | Chart | Position |
|---|---|---|
| 1977 | Country Albums | 31 |

Singles - Billboard (United States)

| Year | Single | Chart | Position |
|---|---|---|---|
| 1977 | "Lady" | Country Singles | 46 |
| 1977 | "After the Ball" | Country Singles | 32 |
