= I Will Rock and Roll with You =

Song by Johnny Cash

Single by Johnny Cash

from the album Gone Girl
- A-side: "I Will Rock and Roll with You" "A Song for the Life" (with Rosanne Cash)
- Released: 1978
- Genre: Country, rock and roll, rockabilly
- Label: Columbia 3-10888
- Songwriter: Johnny Cash
- Producer: Larry Butler

Johnny Cash singles chronology
"It'll Be Her" (1978)	"I Will Rock and Roll with You" (1978)	"(Ghost) Riders in the Sky" (1979)

Audio
- "I Will Rock and Roll with You" on YouTube

"I Will Rock and Roll with You" is a song written and originally recorded by Johnny Cash for his 1978 album Gone Girl.

Cash wrote two songs for the album, one of them being "I Will Rock and Roll with You," a rockedup retelling of his Memphis origins, featuring one of the best lead-guitar breaks to appear on a Johnny Cash tune since Carl Perkins left the group in 1973.

— C. Eric Banister. Johnny Cash FAQ: All That's Left to Know About the Man in Black

There are two songs written by Cash on his album, Gone Girl: "It Comes and Goes" and "I Will Rock and Roll with You." Both seem to look back at his Memphis roots while examining his life with June.

— Johnny Cash, the Songs

Released in December 1978 as the album's third and final single (Columbia 3-10888, with "A Song for the Life" on the opposite side), the song reached number 21 on U.S. Billboard's country chart in March.

Cash later re-recorded the song in 1985 for the album Class of '55: Memphis Rock & Roll Homecoming (1986).

== Track listing ==
7" single (Columbia 3-10888, 1978)
No.	Title	Writer(s)	Collaborator	Length
1.	"I Will Rock and Roll with You"	J. R. Cash		2:50
2.	"A Song for the Life"	R. Crowell	Rosanne Cash	3:07

== Charts ==
Chart (1979)	Peak position
US Hot Country Songs (Billboard)	21
