= Without Love (Nick Lowe song) =

Song by Nick Lowe

Song by Nick Lowe

from the album Labour of Lust
- Released: 1979
- Genre: Country rock, rockabilly, pub rock
- Songwriter: Nick Lowe

Audio
- "Without Love" on YouTube

"Without Love" is a song by Nick Lowe from his 1979 studio album Labour of Lust.

== Johnny Cash version ==
"Without Love"

Single by Johnny Cash

from the album Rockabilly Blues
- B-side: "It Ain't Nothing New Babe"
- Released: January 1981
- Genre: Country
- Label: Columbia 11-11424
- Songwriter: Nick Lowe
- Producer: Nick Lowe

Johnny Cash singles chronology
"The Last Time" (1980)	"Without Love" (1981)	"The Baron" (1981)

Audio
- "Without Love" on YouTube

Johnny Cash covered the song on his 1980 studio album Rockabilly Blues. Nick Lowe himself produced the recording and played on it together with Dave Edmunds.

Released in January 1981 as a single (Columbia 11-11424, with "It Ain't Nothing New Babe" on the opposite side), Cash's version reached number 78 on U.S. Billboard's country chart for the week of February 14, 1981.

=== Track listing ===
7" single (Columbia 11-11424, 1981)
No.	Title	Writer(s)	Length
1.	"Without Love"	N. Lowe	2:26
2.	"It Ain't Nothing New Babe"	B. J. Shaver	4:02

=== Charts ===
Chart (1981)	Peak position
US Hot Country Songs (Billboard)	78
