= Any Old Wind That Blows (song) =

- German release picture sleeve

Single by Johnny Cash

from the album Any Old Wind That Blows
- B-side: "Kentucky Straight"
- Released: November 1972
- Genre: Country
- Length: 2:47
- Label: Columbia
- Songwriter: Deena Rose
- Producer: Larry Butler

Johnny Cash singles chronology
"Oney" (1972)	"Any Old Wind That Blows" (1972)	"The Loving Gift" (1972)

"Any Old Wind That Blows" is a song recorded by American country music artist Johnny Cash. It was released in November 1972 as the third single from his album Any Old Wind That Blows. The song peaked at number 3 on the Billboard Hot Country Singles chart. It also reached number 1 on the RPM Country Tracks chart in Canada. The song was written by Deena Kaye Rose. (Note: Credited as Dick Feller; the song was written and released before Rose came out as transgender.)

== Chart performance ==
Chart (1972–1973)	Peak position
US Hot Country Songs (Billboard)	3
Canadian RPM Country Tracks	1
