= The Last Gunfighter Ballad (song) =

1977 song by Johnny Cash

Single by Johnny Cash

from the album The Last Gunfighter Ballad
- B-side: "City Jail"
- Released: 1977
- Genre: Country
- Label: Columbia 3-10483
- Songwriter: Guy Clark
- Producers: Charlie Bragg, Don Davis

Johnny Cash singles chronology
"It's All Over" (1976)	"The Last Gunfighter Ballad" (1977)	"Lady" (1977)

Audio
- "The Last Gunfighter Ballad" on YouTube

"The Last Gunfighter Ballad" is a song written by Guy Clark and originally recorded by Johnny Cash for his 1977 album The Last Gunfighter Ballad.

Released in early 1977 as a single (Columbia 3-10483, with "City Jail" on the B-side), the song reached number 38 on U.S. Billboard's country chart for the week of April 2.

== Track listing ==
7" single (Columbia 3-10483, 1977)
No.	Title	Writer(s)	Length
1.	"The Last Gunfighter Ballad"	G. Clark	2:45
2.	"City Jail"	J. R. Cash	3:08

== Charts ==
Chart (1977)	Peak position
US Hot Country Songs (Billboard)	38
