= Gone Girl (album) =

Studio album by Johnny Cash
- Released: November 13, 1978
- Studio: Jack Clement Recording (Nashville, Tennessee); Sound Spectrum (Nashville, Tennessee)
- Genre: Country
- Length: 32:07
- Language: English
- Label: Columbia
- Producer: Larry Butler

Johnny Cash chronology
Greatest Hits, Vol. 3 (1978)	Gone Girl (1978)	The Unissued Johnny Cash (1978)

Gone Girl is an album by American country singer Johnny Cash, released on Columbia Records in 1978. It features the Rolling Stones' Beggars Banquet song "No Expectations", the original "It Comes and Goes" and Rodney Crowell's "A Song for the Life", as well as a version of Kenny Rogers' famous single "The Gambler", released just a month before Gone Girl. Three singles from the album, "Gone Girl", "I Will Rock and Roll with You" and "It'll Be Her", were released, but did not reach the country chart's top 20.

== Critical reception ==
Professional ratings
Review scores
Source	Rating
AllMusic	2/5 stars

In 1981, The Boston Globe wrote that the album "promised much (a rockabilly recollection of the Sun days, a cover of the Stones' 'No Expectations') but Cash seemed uncomfortable with the material and the goods weren't delivered."

== Track listing ==
No.	Title	Writer(s)	Length
1.	"Gone Girl"	Jack Clement	3:12
2.	"I Will Rock and Roll with You"	Cash	2:54
3.	"The Diplomat"	Roger Bowling	4:03
4.	"No Expectations"	Mick Jagger, Keith Richards	3:14
5.	"It Comes and Goes"	Cash	2:34
6.	"It'll Be Her"	Billy Ray Reynolds	3:09
7.	"The Gambler"	Don Schlitz	3:43
8.	"Cajun Born"	Kermit Goell, Jo-El Sonnier	3:21
9.	"You and Me" (with June Carter Cash)	Roger Bowling, Larry Butler	2:45
10.	"Song for the Life"	Rodney Crowell	3:12

== Personnel ==
- Johnny Cash – vocals, guitar
- Marshall Grant – bass
- W.S. Holland – drums
- Bob Wootton – electric guitar
- Jimmy Capps, Tommy Allsup – acoustic guitar
- Jack Clement – rhythm guitar
- Earl Poole Ball – piano
- Jerry Hensley – electric and acoustic guitar
- Jack Hale, Bob Lewin – trumpet
- Jo-El Sonnier – concertina, harmonica
- Terry Jacks – guitar
- The Carter Family, Jan Howard, the Jordanaires, Rosanne Cash – backing vocals
- The Shelly Kurland Strings – strings
- Bill Justis – string arrangements on "Gone Girl", "The Diplomat", "It'll Be Her" and "A Sing for the Life"

Technical

- Produced by Larry Butler
- Billy Sherrill, Charlie Bradley, Charlie Bragg, Jerry Watson – engineer
- Virginia Team – art direction
- Norman Seeff – photography

== Charts ==
Singles - Billboard (United States)

Year	Single	Chart	Position
1978	"Gone Girl"	Country Singles	44
1978	"It'll Be Her"	Country Singles	89
1978	"I Will Rock and Roll with You"	Country Singles	21
