= Everybody Loves a Nut (song) =

- German release picture sleeve

Single by Johnny Cash

from the album Everybody Loves a Nut
- A-side: "Everybody Loves a Nut" "Austin Prison"
- Released: May 1966
- Genre: country, novelty
- Label: Columbia 4-43673
- Songwriter: Jack Clement
- Producers: Don Law and Frank Jones

Audio
- "Everybody Loves a Nut" on YouTube

"Everybody Loves a Nut" is a song written by Jack Clement and originally recorded by Johnny Cash on Columbia Records for his 1966 novelty album Everybody Loves a Nut.

Released in May 1966 as the second single (Columbia 4-43673, with "Austin Prison" on the opposite side) from the yet-to-be-released album, the song became a U.S. country top-20 hit.

== Background and critical response ==
In this song Cash "proclaim[s] that the world likes people a little off center and slightly weird."

The second single [from Everybody Loves a Nut] was the album's title track, also written by Clement. "Everybody Loves a Nut" is the quirky tale of people who have odd habits, like keeping a dead horse in a cave, but are still loved. One of the men, a "Columbia man" named Frank, tries to keep a tiger in a tank, while another is kicked out of the Queen's kingdom for not believing the world to be flat—a nod, perhaps, to producers Frank Jones and Don Law.

— C. Eric Banister. Johnny Cash FAQ: All That's Left to Know About the Man in Black

The album opens with Clement's “Everybody Loves a Nut,” and it's clear that he is the driving force behind this collection. Clement always had an ability to creatively find new ways to express his skewed view of life in song. The album's title song depicts a series of vignettes explaining how endearing some folks who might be considered crazy can be. Throughout history we are told, quirky people have made their mark by being labeled nuts and weirdos. There's the hermit named Fred who kept a dead horse in his cave, the Colombian man named Frank who kept a tiger in his tank, and Christopher Columbus who believed the world wasn't flat. Cash slyly makes his point, and this seemingly nonsensical song seems less nonsensical after all. The song made it to number 17 on the country chart and number 96 pop.

— John M. Alexander. The Man in Song: A Discographic Biography of Johnny Cash

== Track listing ==
7" single (Columbia 4-43673, 1966)
No.	Title	Writer(s)	Length
1.	"Everybody Loves a Nut"	Jack Clement	2:04
2.	"Austin Prison"	Johnny Cash	2:06

== Charts ==
Chart (1966)	Peak position
US Billboard Hot 100	96
US Hot Country Songs (Billboard)	17
