= Ragged Old Flag =

Studio album by Johnny Cash
- Released: May 6, 1974
- Recorded: 1974
- Studio: House of Cash Recording Studio, Hendersonville, Tennessee
- Genre: Country; folk
- Length: 29:35
- Label: Columbia
- Producer: Johnny Cash; Charlie Bragg

Johnny Cash chronology
Johnny Cash and His Woman (1973)	Ragged Old Flag (1974)	The Junkie and the Juicehead Minus Me (1974)

Singles from Ragged Old Flag
- 1. "Ragged Old Flag" Released: March 19, 1974

Professional ratings
Review scores
Source	Rating
AllMusic	3/5 stars
The Rolling Stone Album Guide	2.5/5 stars

Ragged Old Flag is the 47th overall album by American country music singer Johnny Cash, released on Columbia Records in 1974. The album addresses several political as well as ethical issues, like many of Cash's other releases. The title track, and the only single from the album, is a spoken word tribute to patriotism amid the Watergate scandal. "Don't Go Near the Water" addresses another hot political issue of the time, the environment. All of the songs on the album were composed by Cash, save "I'm a Worried Man" by himself and June Carter Cash.

== Track listing ==
All tracks are written by Johnny Cash, except where noted.

No.	Title	Writer(s)	Length
1.	"Ragged Old Flag"		3:08
2.	"Don't Go Near the Water"		2:52
3.	"All I Do is Drive"		2:10
4.	"Southern Comfort"		2:10
5.	"King of the Hill"		2:44
6.	"Pie in the Sky"		2:27
7.	"Lonesome to the Bone"		2:41
8.	"While I've Got It on My Mind"		2:20
9.	"Good Morning, Friend"		2:05
10.	"I'm a Worried Man"	Johnny Cash, June Carter Cash	2:10
11.	"Please Don't Let Me Out"		2:42
12.	"What on Earth Will You Do (for Heaven's Sake)"		2:08

== Personnel ==
- Johnny Cash – vocals, producer, liner notes, guitar
- Marshall Grant – bass
- W.S. Holland – drums
- Bob Wootton, Carl Perkins, Ray Edenton – guitar
- Larry McCoy – piano
- Earl Scruggs – banjo on "Ragged Old Flag"
- The Oak Ridge Boys – backing vocals
- Charles Cochran – arranger, orchestration on "Ragged Old Flag"

Technical

- Charlie Bragg – producer, engineer
- Al Quaglieri – producer, reissue producer
- Freeman Ramsey – engineer
- Roger Tucker – chief engineer
- Howard Fritzson – art director, reissue art director
- Billy Barnes – cover design
- Al Clayton – cover photography
- Seth Foster – mastering
- Randall Martin – design
- John Henry Jackson – project director
- Steven Berkowitz – A&R
- Patti Matheny – A&R
- Darren Salmieri – A&R

== Charts ==
Album – Billboard (United States)

Year	Chart	Position
1974	Country Albums	16

Singles – Billboard (United States)

Year	Single	Chart	Position
1974	"Ragged Old Flag"	Country Singles	31
