= Austin Prison =

Single by Johnny Cash

from the album Everybody Loves a Nut
- A-side: "Everybody Loves a Nut" "Austin Prison"
- Released: May 1966
- Genre: country
- Label: Columbia 4-43673
- Songwriter: Johnny Cash
- Producers: Don Law and Frank Jones

Audio
- "Austin Prison" on YouTube

"Austin Prison" is a song written by Johnny Cash and originally recorded by him on Columbia Records for his 1966 novelty album Everybody Loves a Nut.

It was first released in May 1966 as the flip side to the second single (Columbia 4-43673, "Everybody Loves a Nut" / "Austin Prison") from the yet-to-be-released album.

== Lyrical analysis ==
[The song] tells the story of a prisoner who is helped to escape by his jailer. "Now all I want between me and there are a lot of friendly people," he says, "and miles and miles and miles and miles and miles and miles and miles." Cash wrote the song, and he must have felt a very personal connection with it, given that it was recorded soon after his release from jail in Texas.

— C. Eric Banister. Johnny Cash FAQ: All That's Left to Know About the Man in Black

[In the song,] the outlaw narrator is imprisoned for murdering a woman he may not have killed. He's found guilty and sentenced to die, but in a rare happenstance the jailer helps him escape. There certainly is a sense of ambiguity since we don't know for sure if he did or did not kill anyone. But we know that he got away.

— John M. Alexander. The Man in Song: A Discographic Biography of Johnny Cash

== Track listing ==
7" single (Columbia 4-43673, 1966)
No.	Title	Writer(s)	Length
1.	"Everybody Loves a Nut"	Jack Clement	2:04
2.	"Austin Prison"	Johnny Cash	2:06
