= The One on the Right Is on the Left =

- Dutch release picture sleeve

Single by Johnny Cash

from the album Everybody Loves a Nut
- B-side: "Cotton Pickin' Hands"
- Released: February 12, 1966
- Genre: Country, novelty
- Length: 2:46
- Label: Columbia
- Songwriter: Jack Clement
- Producers: Don Law, Frank Jones

Johnny Cash singles chronology
"Happy to Be with You" (1966)	"The One on the Right Is on the Left" (1966)	"Jackson" (1967)

"The One on the Right Is on the Left" is a country song written by Jack Clement. It was recorded by Johnny Cash on November 29, 1965, and included on his novelty album Everybody Loves a Nut (1966). It was the album's first and most successful single (see 1966 in music), reaching #2 on the U.S. Billboard Country Singles chart and #46 on Billboard's Pop Singles chart.

== Content ==
The song is a humorous criticism of musicians that put their political views into their music. It tells the story of a folk song group that is "long on musical ability," but ultimately breaks up due to political differences. At the end of the song, a warning is given not to mix politics with one's music.

The punch line to the joke is that "the guy in the rear", is less easily labeled: he is a Methodist and he burned his driver's license (rather than his draft card), etc. Indeed, the song closes by stating that he got drafted.

== Track listings ==
7" single (Columbia 4-43496, 1966)
No.	Title	Length
1.	"The One on the Right Is on the Left"	2:46
2.	"Cotton Pickin' Hands"	2:19

7" single (Columbia 4-33109, 1967)
No.	Title	Writer(s)	Length
1.	"The One on the Right Is on the Left"	J. H. Clement	2:46
2.	"Boa Constrictor"	Shel Silverstein	1:45

== Chart performance ==
Chart (1966)	Peak position
US Hot Country Songs (Billboard)	2
US Billboard Hot 100	46
Canadian RPM Top Singles	35

== Cover versions ==
Noel Harrison sang the song on The Smothers Brothers Comedy Hour on June 11, 1967. They ended the song by pointing out they had no "guy in the rear" and walked off.
