= Oney (song) =

- German release picture sleeve

Single by Johnny Cash

from the album Any Old Wind That Blows
- B-side: "Country Trash"
- Released: July 1972
- Genre: Country
- Length: 3:07
- Label: Columbia
- Songwriter: Jerry Chesnut
- Producer: Larry Butler

Johnny Cash singles chronology
"If I Had a Hammer" (1972)	"Oney" (1972)	"Any Old Wind That Blows" (1972)

"Oney" is a song recorded by American country music singer-songwriter Johnny Cash. It was released in July 1972 as the second single from his album Any Old Wind That Blows. The song peaked at number 2 on the Billboard Hot Country Singles chart. It also reached number 1 on the RPM Country Tracks chart in Canada. The song was written by Jerry Chesnut.

The song is one of several by Cash paying tribute to the working man. This first-person story is about a factory worker who plans to get retribution against his mean boss. In the song's spoken prologue, Cash dedicates the song "to the working man/for every man that puts in a hard eight or 10 hours a day of work and toil and sweat/always got somebody looking down his neck/trying to get more out of him than he really ought to have to put in."

== Content ==
The song is about a factory worker's retirement day, where he laments about his years of long hours, exhausting, backbreaking and thankless work, and frustration in dealing with a micromanaging boss, Oney. The song's title character, Oney, is a strict boss who demands promptness and sternly reprimands workers for the slightest of infractions, such as showing up five minutes late for work. During the worker's final day, his immediate supervisor (presumably one of Oney's lackeys) drops by, reminding the protagonist that it was Oney who made him and, without his help, would have not succeeded, all while the worker continues to lament about seeing Oney in his sleep.

As quitting time (at 4:30 p.m.) approaches, the worker pictures his retirement party, where he says Oney -- whom the protagonist complains has put in little to no work in the factory, while his employees toil away in poor conditions -- will probably give him a gold watch for his years of hard work. However, the worker says he plans to give something Oney in return: a beating. As the song ends, 4:30 approaches, leading the song's hero to call out, "Oney, Oney!" before chuckling over his plans.

== Charts ==
=== Weekly charts ===
Chart (1972)	Peak position
US Hot Country Songs (Billboard)	2
US Bubbling Under Hot 100 (Billboard)	1
Canadian RPM Country Tracks	1

=== Year-end charts ===
Chart (1972)	Position
US Hot Country Songs (Billboard)	47
