= Gone Girl (Johnny Cash song) =

Song by Johnny Cash

Single by Johnny Cash

from the album Gone Girl
- A-side: "Gone Girl" "I'm Alright Now"
- Released: September 1978
- Genre: country
- Label: Columbia 3-10817
- Songwriter: Jack Clement
- Producer: Larry Butler

Johnny Cash singles chronology
"There Ain't No Good Chain Gang" / "I Wish I Was Crazy Again" (1978)	"Gone Girl" (1978)	"It'll Be Her" (1978)

Audio
- "Gone Girl" on YouTube

"Gone Girl" is a song written by Jack Clement and originally recorded by Johnny Cash, giving its title to Cash's album Gone Girl that appeared in December 1978.

Cash recorded this song with producer Larry Butler on May 4, 1978, later returning to work on it on August 1. "'Gone Girl' was certainly worth the extra time, with a smooth melody that gives Cash the room to glide into the low notes, and a rhythm that is infectious," writes C. Eric Banister in his book Johnny Cash FAQ: All That's Left to Know About the Man in Black.

Released by Cash as a single (Columbia 3-10817, with "I'm Alright Now" on the opposite side) in September, the song only reached number 44 on U.S. Billboard's country chart.

When the first single from Gone Girl was released, Waylon Jennings was just coming down from the #1 spot, where he'd recently been camped out with "I've Always Been Crazy." Instead of putting out a second Cash/Jennings duet [after "There Ain't No Good Chain Gang" that had peaked at country number 2 in August], Columbia — no doubt prodded by Cash — released "Gone Girl," a great song that peaked at #44, held on to #71 the following week, and then dropped out of sight.

— C. Eric Banister. Johnny Cash FAQ: All That's Left to Know About the Man in Black

== Track listing ==
7" single (Columbia 3-10817, 1978)
No.	Title	Writer(s)	Length
1.	"Gone Girl"	J. Clement	3:04
2.	"I'm Alright Now"	J. Hensley	2:40

== Charts ==
Chart (1978)	Peak position
US Hot Country Songs (Billboard)	44
