= Any Old Wind That Blows =

Studio album by Johnny Cash
- Released: January 15, 1973
- Genre: Country; folk
- Length: 29:23
- Label: Columbia
- Producer: Larry Butler

Johnny Cash chronology
På Österåker (1973)	Any Old Wind That Blows (1973)	The Gospel Road (1973)

Singles from Any Old Wind That Blows
- 1. "If I Had a Hammer" Released: June 9, 1972; 2. "Oney" Released: July 28, 1972; 3. "Any Old Wind That Blows" Released: November 9, 1972; 4. "The Loving Gift" Released: December 15, 1972

Professional ratings
Review scores
Source	Rating
Allmusic	2/5 stars

Any Old Wind That Blows is the 44th overall album by American country singer Johnny Cash, released on Columbia Records in 1973 (see 1973 in music). The album spawned three hits, most notably "Oney," which hit #2 on the country singles chart. The title track and Pete Seeger's "If I Had a Hammer" (previously a hit for Peter, Paul, and Mary) also charted. "Country Trash" was re-recorded by Cash nearly three decades later, on American III: Solitary Man. The album itself reached #5 on the country charts.

== Track listing ==
No.	Title	Writer(s)	Length
1.	"Any Old Wind That Blows"	Dick Feller	2:47
2.	"Kentucky Straight"	Johnny Cash	2:05
3.	"The Loving Gift" (with June Carter Cash)	Kris Kristofferson	2:17
4.	"The Good Earth"	Larry Gatlin	3:12
5.	"Best Friend"	Bill Dees, Roy Orbison	3:15
6.	"Oney"	Jerry Chesnut	3:07
7.	"The Ballad of Annie Palmer"	Johnny Cash	3:09
8.	"Too Little Too Late"	Johnny Cash	2:27
9.	"If I Had a Hammer" (with June Carter Cash)	Lee Hays, Pete Seeger	2:28
10.	"Country Trash"	Johnny Cash	2:47
11.	"Welcome Back Jesus"	Traditional	2:49

== Personnel ==
- Johnny Cash – vocals, guitar
- Bob Wootton, Carl Perkins – electric guitar
- Marshall Grant – bass guitar
- WS Holland – drums
- Red Lane, Larry Gatlin, Norman Blake, Ray Edenton – guitar
- Bobby Thompson – guitar, banjo
- Charles Cochrane, George Richey – piano
- Larry Butler – keyboards
- Charlie McCoy – harmonica
- Kenny Malone – percussion
- The Carter Family, The Statler Brothers – background vocals

=== Additional Personnel ===
- Charles Cochran – arrangements on "Any Old Wind That Blows", "Kentucky Straight" and "The Good Earth"
- Don Tweedy – arrangement on "The Loving Gift"
- Charlie Bragg, Roger Tucker, Selby Coffeen, Freeman Ramsey, Jerry Watson – engineering
- Bill Barnes – cover design
- Al Clayton – photography
