= The Reverend Mr. Black =

Single by The Kingston Trio

from the album The Kingston Trio No. 16
- B-side: "One More Round"
- Released: 1963
- Genre: Folk
- Length: 2:59
- Label: Capitol
- Songwriters: Billy Edd Wheeler; Jerry Leiber; Mike Stoller

The Kingston Trio singles chronology
"Greenback Dollar" (1963)	"The Reverend Mr. Black" (1963)	"Desert Pete" (1963)

"The Reverend Mr. Black" (also, "The Lonesome Valley") is a 1963 song by Billy Edd Wheeler, Mike Stoller, and Jerry Leiber.

== Background ==
The chorus came from the 1931 folk song, "The Lonesome Valley," recorded by the Carter Family.

== Kingston Trio recording ==
"The Reverend Mr. Black" was recorded and released by The Kingston Trio in 1963 for their album The Kingston Trio No. 16 and became a top-ten hit for them on the Billboard Hot 100, peaking at number eight. On the Hot R&B Singles chart, it went to number fifteen.

== Other recordings ==
- In 1963, Bill Anderson included it on Still.
- Bobby Darin also included the song on 18 Yellow Roses.
- Johnny Cash covered the song in 1981 for his album The Baron.
- The Fairfield Four recorded a version for the film O Brother, Where Art Thou?
