= Johnny Cash Sings the Ballads of the True West =

1965 studio album by Johnny Cash

Studio album by Johnny Cash
- Released: August 2, 1965
- Recorded: August 14, 1959 – April 26, 1965
- Genre: Western; bluegrass
- Length: 64:52
- Label: Columbia
- Producer: Don Law; Frank Jones

Johnny Cash chronology
Orange Blossom Special (1965)	Johnny Cash Sings the Ballads of the True West (1965)	Everybody Loves a Nut (1966)

Singles from Johnny Cash Sings the Ballads of the True West
- 1. "Mister Garfield / The Streets of Laredo" Released: June 1, 1965

Professional ratings
Review scores
Source	Rating
AllMusic	link
PopMatters	favorable
Record Mirror	3/5 stars
The Rolling Stone Album Guide	3/5 stars

Johnny Cash Sings the Ballads of the True West is a concept double album and the twenty-second overall album released by country singer Johnny Cash, released on Columbia Records in 1965 (see 1965 in music). Covering twenty individual songs, the album, as its title suggests, contains various ballads and other songs on topics related to the history of the American Old West. This includes Carl Perkins' "The Ballad of Boot Hill", "Streets of Laredo", and the sole single from the album, "Mr. Garfield", describing the shock of the population after the assassination of President James Garfield. One of the songs, "25 Minutes to Go", would later be performed at Folsom Prison and appear on Cash's famous At Folsom Prison recording in 1968, while the melody of "Streets of Laredo" would be recycled for the song "The Walls of a Prison" featured on Cash's album From Sea to Shining Sea.

Johnny Cash Sings the Ballads of the True West was re-issued in 2002 (see 2002 in music) through Legacy Recordings, with two bonus tracks, one of which is an instrumental version of a track available on the album. The original album was included on the Bear Family box set Come Along and Ride This Train.

== Track listing ==
Side one
No.	Title	Writer(s)	Length
1.	"Hiawatha's Vision"	Johnny Cash	2:25
2.	"The Road to Kaintuck"	Cash, June Carter	2:43
3.	"The Shifting, Whispering Sands Part I"	V. C. Gilbert, Mary Hadler	2:54
4.	"The Ballad of Boot Hill"	Carl Perkins	3:48
5.	"I Ride an Old Paint"	Traditional, Cash	2:58

Side two
No.	Title	Writer(s)	Length
6.	"Hardin Wouldn't Run"	Cash	4:19
7.	"Mr. Garfield"	Ramblin' Jack Elliott	4:35
8.	"Streets of Laredo"	Traditional, Cash	3:39
9.	"Johnny Reb"	Merle Kilgore	2:50
10.	"A Letter from Home"	Maybelle Carter, Dearest Dean	2:35

Side three
No.	Title	Writer(s)	Length
11.	"Bury Me Not on the Lone Prairie"	Traditional, Cash	2:26
12.	"Mean as Hell"	Cash	3:07
13.	"Sam Hall"	Tex Ritter	3:15
14.	"25 Minutes to Go"	Shel Silverstein	3:14
15.	"The Blizzard"	Harlan Howard	3:53

Side four
No.	Title	Writer(s)	Length
16.	"Sweet Betsy from Pike"	Jimmie Driftwood	3:57
17.	"Green Grow the Lilacs"	Traditional, Cash	2:47
18.	"Stampede"	Peter La Farge	4:01
19.	"The Shifting, Whispering Sands Part II"	Jack Gilbert, Mary Hadler	2:28
20.	"Reflections"	Cash	2:58

Bonus Tracks
No.	Title	Writer(s)	Length
21.	"Rodeo Hand"	La Farge	2:27
22.	"Stampede" (Instrumental)	La Farge	1:07
Total length:			68:26

== Personnel ==
- Johnny Cash - vocals, guitar
- Luther Perkins - guitar
- Norman Blake, Jack Clement - acoustic guitar
- Bob Johnson - 12-string guitar, flute, banjo, mandocello
- Marshall Grant - bass
- W.S. Holland - drums
- Michael N. Kazak - drums
- Bill Pursell - piano, harpsichord
- Charlie McCoy - harmonica
- Mother Maybelle Carter - autoharp
- The Carter Family, The Statler Brothers - background vocals

== Modern interpretations & associations ==
Baltimore based creative folklore/music ensemble Television Hill have recorded a 6-song concept EP called My Name's Hardin, the title of which pokes fun at Bob Dylan's misspelling of outlaw Wes Hardin's name on his 1967 release John Wesley Harding and paying homage to Dylan's record and Johnny Cash's double concept LP Johnny Cash Sings the Ballads of the True West. The EP is a biographical work exploring Wes Hardin's life and draws from Hardin's autobiography, Letters from Prison and an assortment of other biographical and relevant source material.

== Mean as Hell! ==
In March, 1966 (see 1966 in music), Columbia released Mean as Hell!: Ballads From The True West, a single LP distillation of Johnny Cash Sings the Ballads of the True West. It peaked at #4 on the top country albums chart. It has not been released on CD.

Mean as Hell! : Ballads From The True West

Studio album by Johnny Cash
- Released: March 1966
- Recorded: August 14, 1959–April 26, 1965
- Genre: Country; folk
- Length: 38:15
- Label: Columbia
- Producer: Don Law, Frank Jones

Professional ratings
Review scores
Source	Rating
Allmusic	link

== Track listing ==
Side one
No.	Title	Writer(s)	Length
1.	"The Shifting Whispering Sands, Part I"	Jack V.C. Gilbert, Mary Margaret Hadler	2:54
2.	"I Ride an Old Paint"	Traditional, Cash	2:58
3.	"The Road to Kaintuck"	Cash, June Carter	2:43
4.	"A Letter from Home"	Maybelle Carter, Dearest Dean	2:35
5.	"Mean as Hell"	Cash	3:07
6.	"25 Minutes to Go"	Shel Silverstein	3:14

Side two
No.	Title	Writer(s)	Length
7.	"Mr. Garfield"	Ramblin' Jack Elliott	4:35
8.	"The Blizzard"	Harlan Howard	3:53
9.	"Streets of Laredo"	Traditional, Cash	3:39
10.	"Sweet Betsy from Pike"	Jimmie Driftwood	3:14
11.	"Stampede"	Peter La Farge	2:57
12.	"Bury Me Not on the Lone Prairie"	Traditional, Cash	2:26

== Charts ==
Album - Billboard (United States)

Year	Chart	Position
1965	Country Albums	4

Singles - Billboard (United States)

Year	Single	Chart	Position
1965	"Mr. Garfield"	Country Singles	15
