= Come Along and Ride This Train =

Come Along And Ride This Train

Box set by Johnny Cash
- Released: 1991
- Recorded: 1960–1977
- Genre: Country
- Length: 282:34
- Label: Bear Family
- Producers: Don Law; Jack Clement; Sam Phillips

Johnny Cash chronology
The Man in Black 1954-1958 (1990)	Come Along And Ride This Train (1991)	The Man in Black 1959-1962 (1991)

Professional ratings
Review scores
Source	Rating
Allmusic	link
The Rolling Stone Album Guide	4/5 stars

Come Along And Ride This Train is a Bear Family Records 4-CD box set of Johnny Cash's music. This set brings together all of his uniquely American albums: Ride This Train, Blood, Sweat and Tears, Sings the Ballads of the True West, Bitter Tears: Ballads of the American Indian, America: A 200-Year Salute in Story and Song, From Sea to Shining Sea, and The Rambler.

== Track listing ==
Disc One
No.	Title	Original Album	Length
1.	"Come Along and Ride This Train"	Previously unreleased	2:33
2.	"Loading Coal"	Ride This Train	5:02
3.	"Slow Rider"	Ride This Train	4:13
4.	"The Shifting Whispering Sands"	Previously unreleased	2:30
5.	"Lumberjack"	Ride This Train	3:03
6.	"Dorraine of Ponchartrain"	Ride This Train	4:47
7.	"Going to Memphis"	Ride This Train	4:20
8.	"When Papa Played the Dobro"	Ride This Train	2:56
9.	"Boss Jack"	Ride This Train	3:57
10.	"Old Doc Brown"	Ride This Train	4:14
11.	"The Legend of John Henry's Hammer"	Blood, Sweat and Tears	8:25
12.	"Tell Him I'm Gone"	Blood, Sweat and Tears	3:03
13.	"Another Man Done Gone"	Blood, Sweat and Tears	2:35
14.	"Casey Jones"	Blood, Sweat and Tears	3:01
15.	"Nine Pound Hammer"	Blood, Sweat and Tears	3:17
16.	"Chain Gang"	Blood, Sweat and Tears	2:39
17.	"Busted"	Blood, Sweat and Tears	2:16
18.	"Waiting for a Train"	Blood, Sweat and Tears	2:06
19.	"Roughneck"	Blood, Sweat and Tears	2:11
20.	"Pick a Bale o' Cotton"	"Bonanza!" single	1:58
21.	"Cotton Pickin' Hands"	"The One on the Right Is on the Left" single	2:21

Disc Two
No.	Title	Original Album	Length
1.	"Hiawatha's Vision"	Sings the Ballads of the True West	2:26
2.	"The Road to Kaintuck"	Sings the Ballads of the True West	2:42
3.	"Hammer and Nails" (with The Statler Brothers)	"Hammer and Nails" single	2:39
4.	"The Shifting Whispering Sands, Pt. 1"	Sings the Ballads of the True West	2:53
5.	"The Ballad of Boot Hill"	Sings the Ballads of the True West	3:49
6.	"I Ride an Old Paint"	Sings the Ballads of the True West	2:57
7.	"Hardin Wouldn't Run"	Sings the Ballads of the True West	4:20
8.	"Mr. Garfield"	Sings the Ballads of the True West	4:37
9.	"Streets of Laredo"	Sings the Ballads of the True West	4:40
10.	"Johnny Reb"	Sings the Ballads of the True West	2:51
11.	"A Letter from Home"	Sings the Ballads of the True West	2:34
12.	"Bury Me Not on the Lone Prairie"	Sings the Ballads of the True West	2:26
13.	"Mean as Hell"	Sings the Ballads of the True West	3:08
14.	"Sam Hall"	Sings the Ballads of the True West	3:16
15.	"25 Minutes to Go"	Sings the Ballads of the True West	3:13
16.	"The Blizzard"	Sings the Ballads of the True West	3:53
17.	"Sweet Betsy from Pike"	Sings the Ballads of the True West	3:57
18.	"Green Grow the Lilacs"	Sings the Ballads of the True West	2:47
19.	"Rodeo Hand"	Previously unreleased	2:25
20.	"Stampede"	Sings the Ballads of the True West	3:59
21.	"The Shifting Whispering Sands, Pt. 2"	Sings the Ballads of the True West	2:29
22.	"Remember the Alamo"	The Rebel - Johnny Yuma EP	2:47
23.	"Reflections"	Sings the Ballads of the True West	2:45

Disc Three
No.	Title	Original Album	Length
1.	"Big Foot" (same version as on "America" but with a shortened spoken Intro)	America: A 200-Year Salute in Story and Song	2:48
2.	"As Long as the Grass Shall Grow"	Bitter Tears: Ballads of the American Indian	6:09
3.	"Apache Tears"	Bitter Tears: Ballads of the American Indian	2:36
4.	"Custer"	Bitter Tears: Ballads of the American Indian	2:20
5.	"The Talking Leaves"	Bitter Tears: Ballads of the American Indian	3:55
6.	"The Ballad of Ira Hayes"	Bitter Tears: Ballads of the American Indian	4:08
7.	"Drums"	Bitter Tears: Ballads of the American Indian	5:04
8.	"White Girl"	Bitter Tears: Ballads of the American Indian	3:01
9.	"Old Apache Squaw"	Songs of Our Soil	1:41
10.	"The Vanishing Race"	Bitter Tears: Ballads of the American Indian	4:04
11.	"Opening Dialogue"	America: A 200-Year Salute in Story and Song	0:23
12.	"Paul Revere"	America: A 200-Year Salute in Story and Song	2:18
13.	"Begin West Movement"	America: A 200-Year Salute in Story and Song	0:27
14.	"The Road to Kaintuck"	America: A 200-Year Salute in Story and Song	1:22
15.	"To the Shining Mountains"	America: A 200-Year Salute in Story and Song	0:49
16.	"The Battle of New Orleans"	America: A 200-Year Salute in Story and Song	2:21
17.	"Southwestward"	America: A 200-Year Salute in Story and Song	0:38
18.	"Remember the Alamo"	America: A 200-Year Salute in Story and Song	2:27
19.	"Opening the West"	America: A 200-Year Salute in Story and Song	0:54
20.	"Lorena"	America: A 200-Year Salute in Story and Song	1:52
21.	"The Gettysburg Address"	America: A 200-Year Salute in Story and Song	2:38
22.	"The West"	America: A 200-Year Salute in Story and Song	0:58
23.	"Big Foot"	America: A 200-Year Salute in Story and Song	3:02
24.	"Like a Young Colt"	America: A 200-Year Salute in Story and Song	0:38
25.	"Mr. Garfield"	America: A 200-Year Salute in Story and Song	3:54
26.	"A Proud Land"	America: A 200-Year Salute in Story and Song	0:25
27.	"The Big Battle"	America: A 200-Year Salute in Story and Song	3:05
28.	"On Wheels and Wings"	America: A 200-Year Salute in Story and Song	0:31
29.	"Come Take a Trip in My Airship"	America: A 200-Year Salute in Story and Song	1:06
30.	"Reaching for the Stars"	America: A 200-Year Salute in Story and Song	0:42
31.	"These Are My People"	America: A 200-Year Salute in Story and Song	2:36

Disc Four
No.	Title	Original Album	Length
1.	"From Sea to Shining Sea"	From Sea to Shining Sea
2.	"Whirl and The Suck"	From Sea to Shining Sea
3.	"Call Daddy from the Mines"	From Sea to Shining Sea
4.	"Frozen Four Hundred Pound Fair to Middlin' Cotton Picker"	From Sea to Shining Sea
5.	"Walls of a Prison"	From Sea to Shining Sea
6.	"Masterpiece"	From Sea to Shining Sea
7.	"You and Tennessee"	From Sea to Shining Sea
8.	"She Came from the Mountains"	Happiness Is You
9.	"Another Song to Sing"	From Sea to Shining Sea
10.	"Flint Arrowhead"	From Sea to Shining Sea
11.	"Cisco Clifton's Fillin' Station"	From Sea to Shining Sea
12.	"Shrimpin' Sailin'"	From Sea to Shining Sea
13.	"From Sea to Shining Sea"	From Sea to Shining Sea
14.	"Hit the Road and Go"	The Rambler
15.	"Dialogue #1"	The Rambler
16.	"If It Wasn't for the Wabash River"	The Rambler
17.	"Dialogue #2"	The Rambler
18.	"Lady"	The Rambler
19.	"Dialogue #3"	The Rambler
20.	"After the Ball"	The Rambler
21.	"Dialogue #4"	The Rambler
22.	"No Earthly Good"	The Rambler
23.	"Dialogue #5"	The Rambler
24.	"Wednesday Car"	The Rambler
25.	"Dialogue #6"	The Rambler
26.	"My Cowboy's Last Ride"	The Rambler
27.	"Dialogue #7"	The Rambler
28.	"Calilou"	The Rambler
29.	"Dialogue #8"	The Rambler
30.	"Come Along and Ride This Train"	Previously unreleased

== Credits ==
- Mastered By - Duncan Cowell
- Producer - Don Law, Frank Jones, Larry Butler, Charlie Bragg, Jack Routh
- Reissue Producer - Richard Weize
