= Greatest! =

Compilation album by Johnny Cash
- Released: October 19, 1959
- Recorded: July 30, 1955–July 17, 1958
- Genres: Country; rockabilly
- Length: 25:46
- Label: Sun
- Producers: Sam Phillips; Jack Clement

Johnny Cash chronology
Songs of Our Soil (1959)	Greatest! (1959)	Now, There Was a Song! (1960)

Singles from Greatest!
- 1. "It's Just About Time" Released: November 12, 1958; 2. "Luther Played the Boogie" Released: February 15, 1959; 3. "Katy Too" Released: June 2, 1959; 4. "Goodbye Little Darlin'" Released: September 15, 1959

Professional ratings
Review scores
Source	Rating
AllMusic	3/5 stars
The Rolling Stone Album Guide	4/5 stars

Greatest! is a compilation album by American singer-songwriter Johnny Cash. It was released on October 19, 1959, by Sun Records after Cash had left the label and signed with Columbia Records. The album is made of songs Cash recorded for Sun prior to leaving the label. The album was re-issued in 2003 by Varèse Sarabande with four additional tracks, two of them being alternate versions of songs already on the album.

The tracks on Greatest! were recorded between July 1955 and July 1958. Six out of the twelve songs became singles, with "Get Rhythm" topping the Country charts and becoming the most successful one.

== Track listing ==
Side one
No.	Title	Writer(s)	Length
1.	"Goodbye Little Darlin' Goodbye"	Gene Autry, Johnny Marvin	2:14
2.	"I Just Thought You'd Like to Know"	Charlie Rich, Bill Justis	2:23
3.	"You Tell Me"	Roy Orbison	1:48
4.	"Just About Time"	Johnny Cash	2:07
5.	"I Forgot to Remember to Forget"	Stan Kesler, Charlie Feathers	2:09
6.	"Katy Too"	Johnny Cash, Jack Clement	1:57

Side two
No.	Title	Writer(s)	Length
7.	"Thanks a Lot"	Charlie Rich	2:38
8.	"Luther Played the Boogie"	Johnny Cash	2:03
9.	"You Win Again"	Hank Williams	2:18
10.	"Hey Good Lookin'"	Hank Williams	1:41
11.	"I Could Never Be Ashamed of You"	Hank Williams	2:14
12.	"Get Rhythm"	Johnny Cash	2:14

Bonus tracks
No.	Title	Writer(s)	Length
13.	"Fool's Hall of Fame"	Jerry Freeman, Danny Wolfe	2:26
14.	"I Forgot to Remember to Forget" (Undubbed Master)	Stan Kesler, Charlie Feathers	2:11
15.	"Hey Good Lookin'" (Undubbed Master)	Hank Williams	1:43
16.	"Rock and Roll Ruby"	Johnny Cash	1:42
Total length:			33:48

== Charts ==
Singles - Billboard (United States)

Year	Single	Chart	Position
1958	"Just About Time"	Country Singles	30
1959	"Thanks a Lot"	Country Singles	12
1959	"Luther Played the Boogie"	Country Singles	8
1959	"Katy Too"	Country Singles	11
1959	"Cry Cry Cry"	Pop Singles	66
1959	"Goodbye Little Darlin' Goodbye"	Country Singles	22
1959	"Get Rhythm"	Country Singles	1
