= The Essential Johnny Cash (1992 album) =

The Essential Johnny Cash 1955–1983

Box set by Johnny Cash
- Released: 1992
- Recorded: 1955–1983
- Genre: Country
- Length: 3:29:11
- Label: Legacy

Professional ratings
Review scores
Source	Rating
Allmusic	5/5 stars

The Essential Johnny Cash 1955–1983 is a three-disc compilation album containing Johnny Cash's material from 1955 to 1983. It was originally released in 1992 by Sony Music, as part of its Columbia Country Classics series, as a long box set containing three individually-cased discs. Later pressings would be housed in a single, standard-side 3-disc jewel case.

== Track listing ==
Disc one
No.	Title	Writer(s)	Length
1.	"Hey Porter"	Johnny Cash	2:11
2.	"Cry! Cry! Cry!"	Johnny Cash	2:23
3.	"Folsom Prison Blues"	Johnny Cash	2:48
4.	"Luther Played the Boogie"	Johnny Cash	2:01
5.	"Get Rhythm"	Johnny Cash	2:12
6.	"I Walk the Line"	Johnny Cash	2:42
7.	"Home of the Blues"	Johnny Cash / Glen Douglas / Vic McAlpin	2:38
8.	"Give My Love to Rose"	Johnny Cash	2:43
9.	"Rock Island Line"	Lead Belly	2:08
10.	"Doin' My Time"	Jimmie Skinner	2:37
11.	"Big River"	Johnny Cash	2:30
12.	"Ballad of a Teenage Queen"	Jack Clement	2:10
13.	"Guess Things Happen That Way"	Jack Clement	1:48
14.	"The Ways of a Woman in Love"	Bill Justis / Charlie Rich	2:14
15.	"Thanks a Lot"	Charlie Rich	2:36
16.	"Oh, What a Dream"	Johnny Cash	2:03
17.	"What Do I Care"	Johnny Cash	2:07
18.	"All Over Again"	Johnny Cash	2:05
19.	"I Still Miss Someone"	Johnny Cash / Roy Cash	2:34
20.	"I'd Just Be Fool Enough (to Fall)"	Melvin Endsley	2:08
21.	"Walking the Blues"	Johnny Cash / Robert Lunn	2:08
22.	"Frankie's Man, Johnny"	Johnny Cash	2:14
23.	"Tennessee Flat Top Box"	Johnny Cash	2:58
24.	"Sing It Pretty, Sue"	Johnny Cash	1:57
25.	"Pickin' Time"	Johnny Cash	1:57
26.	"Five Feet High and Rising"	Johnny Cash	1:46
27.	"The Old Account"	Traditional	2:18
28.	"(There'll Be) Peace in the Valley (For Me)"	Rev. Thomas A. Dorsey	2:45
29.	"Were You There (When They Crucified My Lord)"	Traditional	3:53
Total length:			1:08:34

Disc two
No.	Title	Writer(s)	Length
1.	"Don't Take Your Guns to Town"	Johnny Cash	3:01
2.	"The Ballad of Boot Hill"	Carl Perkins	2:34
3.	"The Rebel – Johnny Yuma"	Richard Markowitz	1:51
4.	"The Big Battle"	Johnny Cash	4:02
5.	"When the Roses Bloom Again"	A. P. Carter	2:34
6.	"The Ballad of Ira Hayes"	Peter La Farge	4:07
7.	"The Legend of John Henry's Hammer"	Johnny Cash / June Carter Cash	8:24
8.	"Dark as a Dungeon"	Merle Travis	2:27
9.	"The Long Black Veil"	Danny Dill / Marijohn Wilkin	3:06
10.	"I Got Stripes"	Johnny Cash / Charlie Williams	2:02
11.	"25 Minutes to Go"	Shel Silverstein	3:11
12.	"The Wall"	Harlan Howard	2:08
13.	"Busted"	Harlan Howard	2:15
14.	"Bad News"	John D. Loudermilk	2:56
15.	"Dirty Old Egg-Sucking Dog"	Jack Clement	2:06
16.	"Orange Blossom Special"	Ervin T. Rouse	3:05
17.	"Ring of Fire"	June Carter Cash / Merle Kilgore	2:36
18.	"Understand Your Man"	Johnny Cash	2:42
19.	"Jackson"	Jerry Leiber [as Gaby Rodgers] / Billy Edd Wheeler	2:44
20.	"Blistered"	Billy Edd Wheeler	2:20
21.	"See Ruby Fall"	Johnny Cash / Roy Orbison	2:50
22.	"Cisco Clifton's Fillin' Station"	Johnny Cash	2:40
23.	"Daddy Sang Bass"	Carl Perkins	2:19
Total length:			1:08:00

Disc Three
No.	Title	Writer(s)	Length
1.	"Folsom Prison Blues" (live)	Johnny Cash	2:41
2.	"Cocaine Blues" (live)	T.J. "Red" Arnall	2:44
3.	"San Quentin 2" (live)	Johnny Cash	2:32
4.	"A Boy Named Sue" (live)	Shel Silverstein	3:46
5.	"Wanted Man"	Bob Dylan	2:50
6.	"Singin' in Viet Nam Talkin' Blues"	Johnny Cash	2:54
7.	"Man in Black"	Johnny Cash	2:52
8.	"What Is Truth"	Johnny Cash	2:37
9.	"Flesh and Blood"	Johnny Cash	2:35
10.	"Sunday Morning Coming Down"	Kris Kristofferson	4:06
11.	"Oney"	Jerry Chesnut	3:04
12.	"One Piece at a Time"	Wayne Kemp	4:00
13.	"Hit the Road and Go"	Johnny Cash	2:41
14.	"Rockabilly Blues (Texas 1955)"	Johnny Cash	3:19
15.	"I Will Rock and Roll with You"	Johnny Cash	2:50
16.	"No Expectations"	Mick Jagger / Keith Richards	3:10
17.	"(Ghost) Riders In The Sky"	Stan Jones	3:46
18.	"Bull Rider"	Rodney Crowell	3:08
19.	"Highway Patrolman"	Bruce Springsteen	5:20
20.	"After the Ball"	Johnny Cash	3:00
21.	"Without Love"	Nick Lowe	2:28
22.	"The Last Time"	Kris Kristofferson	3:14
23.	"I'm Gonna Sit on the Porch and Pick on My Old Guitar"	Johnny Cash	3:00
Total length:			1:12:37
