= Patrick Sky (album) =

Studio album by Patrick Sky
- Released: 1965
- Genre: Folk
- Length: 39:13
- Label: Vanguard

Patrick Sky chronology
Patrick Sky (1965)	A Harvest of Gentle Clang (1966)

Professional ratings
Review scores
Source	Rating
Allmusic	link

Patrick Sky is the self-titled debut album of Patrick Sky, released in 1965 on the Vanguard label.

== Track listing ==
All tracks composed by Patrick Sky; except where indicated:

=== Side one ===
1. "Many a Mile"
2. "Hangin' Round"
3. "Love Will Endure"
4. "Reuben" (Traditional)
5. "Rattlesnake Mountain" (Traditional)
6. "Everytime" (Tom Paxton)

=== Side two ===
1. "Come With Me Love"
2. "Nectar of God"
3. "Separation Blues"
4. "Ballad of Ira Hayes" (Peter LaFarge)
5. "Words Without Music" (Dayle Stanley)
6. "Wreck of the 97" (Dewey, Noell, Wittier)

== Personnel ==
- Patrick Sky - guitar, vocals, harmonica
- Ralph Rinzler - mandolin on "Come With Me Love" and "Wreck of the 97"
