= Lasso from El Paso =

Studio album by Kinky Friedman
- Released: 1976
- Studios: SugarHill (Houston, Texas)
- Genre: Country rock
- Length: 38:37
- Label: Epic
- Producers: Kinky Friedman; Huey P. Meaux

Kinky Friedman chronology
Kinky Friedman (1974)	Lasso from El Paso (1976)	Live from the Lone Star Cafe (1982)

Lasso from El Paso is an album by Kinky Friedman, released in 1976. "Sold American" was recorded live while on tour with Bob Dylan's Rolling Thunder Revue. It was Friedman's last album of original material for more than 40 years.

== Critical reception ==
Professional ratings
Review scores
Source	Rating
AllMusic	4.5/5 stars
Robert Christgau	C
The Encyclopedia of Popular Music	3/5 stars
MusicHound Folk: The Essential Album Guide	3/5 stars
The Rolling Stone Album Guide	2.5/5 stars

AllMusic wrote that "of the many albums that grew out of Bob Dylan's Rolling Thunder Revue, this must be the strangest." Reviewing a reissue of the album, Record Collector wrote: "Undoubtedly dated, but not lacking in the redeeming yuck factor, one can still enjoy the absurd 'Bananas And Cream' and 'Waitret, Please, Waitret' in mixed company."

== Track listing ==
All songs by Kinky Friedman except where noted.

Side one

1. "Sold American" – 3:36
2. "Twinkle" – 3:21
3. "Ahab the Arab" (Ray Stevens) – 3:31
4. "Dear Abbie" – 3:12
5. "Kinky" (Ronnie Hawkins) – 2:57
6. "Lady Yesterday" – 3:57

Side two

1. "Catfish" (Bob Dylan, Jacques Levy) – 3:01
2. "Men's Room, L.A." (Buck Fowler) – 2:10
3. "Bananas and Cream" – 2:41
4. "Ol' Ben Lucas" – 1:39
5. "The Ballad of Ira Hayes" (Peter LaFarge) – 5:10
6. "Waitret, Please, Waitret" (Friedman, Major Boles, Roscoe West) – 2:25

== Personnel ==
- Kinky Friedman – lead vocals
- Jim Atkinson, T-Bone Burnett, Eric Clapton, Tom Culpepper, Kinky Friedman, Bill Ham, Levon Helm, Mick Ronson, Steven Soles – guitar
- Eric Clapton – dobro on "Kinky" and "Ol' Ben Lucas"
- Ronnie Wood – guitar on "Kinky"
- Lowell George – guitar on "Catfish"
- Ringo Starr – voice of Jesus on "Men's Room, L.A."
- Brian Clark, Rick Danko, Terry Danko, Kenny Gradney, Rob Stoner, Ira Wikes – bass
- Dr. John, Jewford Shelby, Ken Lauber, Red Young, Richard Manuel, T-Bone Burnett – keyboards
- Al Garth, Fiddlin' Frenchie Burke – fiddle
- Michael De Temple – mandolin
- Ken "Snakebite" Jacobs – horns
- Major Bowles, Gary Burke, Teddy Jack Eddy (Gary Busey), Richie Hayward, Levon Helm, Richard Manuel, Terry Danko, Dahrell Norris, Howie Wyeth – drums
- Terry Danko, Levon Helm, Rick Danko, Ronnie Hawkins, Roscoe West, Teddy Jack Eddy (Gary Busey), Jim Atkinson, Tracey Balin – backing vocals
