= Luang Prabang (disambiguation) =

Luang Prabang or Louangphrabang is a city in Laos.

Luang Prabang may also refer to:

- Luang Prabang Province, Laos
- Kingdom of Luang Phrabang, formed in 1707 as a result of the split of the Kingdom of Lan Xang in Laos
- "Luang Prabang" (song), a song written by Dave Van Ronk
- Luang Prabang Range, a mountain range straddling northwestern Laos and Northern Thailand
