= Blood, Sweat and Tears (Johnny Cash album) =

Studio album by Johnny Cash
- Released: January 7, 1963
- Recorded: June 7 – August 22, 1962
- Genre: Country; folk; blues
- Length: 30:12
- Label: Columbia
- Producer: Don Law; Frank Jones

Johnny Cash chronology
All Aboard the Blue Train (1962)	Blood, Sweat and Tears (1963)	Ring of Fire: The Best of Johnny Cash (1963)

Singles from Blood, Sweat and Tears
- 1. "Busted" Released: December 28, 1962

Professional ratings
Review scores
Source	Rating
AllMusic	link
The Rolling Stone Album Guide	3/5 stars

Blood, Sweat and Tears is the ninth album by singer Johnny Cash, released on January 7, 1963. It is a collection of songs about the American working man. This includes "The Legend of John Henry's Hammer" and "Busted", the latter of which would become a single. Both would also be performed by Cash during his famous 1968 concerts at Folsom Prison and be included in the 1999 extended reissue of the album, At Folsom Prison. The album was included on the Bear Family Records box set Come Along and Ride This Train.

== Track listing ==
Side one
No.	Title	Writer(s)	Length
1.	"The Legend of John Henry's Hammer"	Johnny Cash, June Carter	8:26
2.	"Tell Him I'm Gone"	Cash	3:02
3.	"Another Man Done Gone"	Vera Hall, Alan Lomax, John Lomax, Ruby Tartt, Cash	2:32

Side two
No.	Title	Writer(s)	Length
4.	"Busted"	Harlan Howard	2:16
5.	"Casey Jones"	Traditional; arranged by Johnny Cash	3:00
6.	"Nine Pound Hammer"	Merle Travis	3:15
7.	"Chain Gang"	Howard	2:39
8.	"Waiting for a Train"	Jimmie Rodgers	2:04
9.	"Roughneck"	Sheb Wooley	2:09

== Personnel ==
- Johnny Cash - vocals, rhythm guitar
- The Carter Family - backing vocals
- Luther Perkins - lead guitar
- Bob Johnson - guitar, banjo
- Marshall Grant - bass
- W.S. Holland - drums
- Maybelle Carter - autoharp
- Bill Pursell - piano

Additional personnel

- Frank Jones - Producer
- Don Law - Producer
- Vic Anesini - Mastering (CD Reissue)
- Frank Bez - Photography

== Charts ==
Album - Billboard (United States)

Year	Chart	Position
1963	Billboard Top LPs	80

Singles - Billboard (United States)

Year	Single	Chart	Position
1963	"Busted"	Country Singles	13
