= From Sea to Shining Sea =

Studio album by Johnny Cash
- Released: January 15, 1968
- Recorded: March 1 – April 13, 1967
- Genre: Country; folk
- Length: 31:54
- Label: Columbia
- Producer: Don Law; Frank Jones

Johnny Cash chronology
Carryin' On with Johnny Cash & June Carter (1967)	From Sea to Shining Sea (1968)	At Folsom Prison (1968)

Professional ratings
Review scores
Source	Rating
Allmusic	link

From Sea to Shining Sea is a concept album and 26th album by country singer Johnny Cash, released on Columbia Records in 1968 (see 1968 in music). Each track on the album was written by Cash; none of them were released as singles. The album was included on the Bear Family box set Come Along and Ride This Train.

"The Walls of a Prison" reuses the melody of "Streets of Laredo" from Cash's 1965 album Sings the Ballads of the True West.

== Track listing ==
All tracks are written by Johnny Cash.

No.	Title	Length
1.	"From Sea to Shining Sea"	1:38
2.	"The Whirl and the Suck"	3:07
3.	"Call Daddy from the Mines"	3:03
4.	"The Frozen Four-Hundred-Pound Fair-to-Middlin' Cotton Picker"	2:32
5.	"The Walls of a Prison"	4:01
6.	"The Masterpiece"	2:47
7.	"You and Tennessee"	3:08
8.	"Another Song to Sing"	2:00
9.	"The Flint Arrowhead"	2:56
10.	"Cisco Clifton's Filling Station"	2:42
11.	"Shrimpin' Sailin'"	3:06
12.	"From Sea to Shining Sea (Finale)"	0:54
Total length:		31:54

== Personnel ==
- Johnny Cash – vocals, guitar
- Carl Perkins, Luther Perkins – guitar
- Bob Johnson – guitar, banjo, dobro
- Norman Blake – dobro
- Marshall Grant – bass
- W.S. Holland – drums
- Charlie McCoy – harmonica
- The Carter Family – backing vocals

== Additional personnel ==
- Produced by: Don Law
- Engineering: Charlie Bragg and Jerry Watson
- Cover photo: Bob Cato
