= Through a Window =

Studio album by Patrick Sky
- Released: 1985
- Genre: Folk
- Label: Shanachie
- Producer: Patrick Sky

Patrick Sky chronology
Two Steps Forward, One Step Back (1975)	Through a Window (1985)	Down to Us (2009)

Professional ratings
Review scores
Source	Rating
Allmusic	4.5/5 stars

Through a Window is the seventh album by Patrick Sky, recorded in 1985.

== Track listing ==
=== Side A ===
- 1." San Francisco Bay Blues"
  - I'll never forget Jesse Fuller playing his Foot-Della [sic] (a string-bass operated by the foot) at the Gaslight in New York. He played a 3-hour set and had to be dragged offstage.
- 2. "Ramblin' Boy"
  - Tom Paxton's best.
- 3. "Separation Blues"
  - My own contribution. I'm told it's a popular camp song.
- 4. " Dark as a Dungeon"
  - Although this song was written much earlier it was important to me when I was involved in raising money for the Hazard miners. There is no better mining song.
- 5. Mississippi John Hurt's "Candy Man"
  - His style of fingerpicking influenced me more than any other player. Candy Man — what a metaphor!
- 6. "Blowin' in the Wind"
  - When this song first hit the airwaves it shocked everyone. The anthem of the sixties.

=== Side B ===
- 1. Reverend Gary Davis "Candy Man"
  - The Reverend's style of fingerpicking along with Merle Travis' set the standard.
- 2. ""Don't Think Twice"
  - The great Dylan song was heavily influenced by our mutual friend, Paul Clayton — collector and singer; his logging camp songs were gems.
- 3. "Ballad of Ira Hayes"
  - The plight of the Native Americans was never more poignantly expressed.
- 4. "Freight Train"
  - Is there anyone who plays a guitar that does not know Libba Cotten's Freight Train?
- 5. "Louise"
  - Paul Siebel still remains one of my favorite songwriters.
- 6. "Good Night Irene"
  - I'll never forget the first time I heard Ledbelly [sic] on the 12 string guitar. I ran to a pawn shop and bought an old plywood 'Harmony". Later I used it for a planter.

== Personnel ==
- Patrick Sky - vocal, acoustic guitar
- Michael Shorrock - bass
- Laura Furlong - fiddle
- Ted Bird - harmonica

Technical

- Produced, supervised, recorded and engineered by Patrick Sky — Skylark Productions.
- Assistant Engineer: Ray Noren
- Graphics: Cathy Sky
- Photos: Ray Clayton
