= Photographs (Patrick Sky album) =

Studio album by Patrick Sky
- Released: 1969
- Genre: Folk
- Label: Verve Forecast
- Producer: Barry Kornfeld

Patrick Sky chronology
Reality Is Bad Enough (1968)	Photographs (1969)	Songs That Made America Famous (1973)

Professional ratings
Review scores
Source	Rating
Allmusic	link

Photographs is the fourth album by Patrick Sky, released in 1969.

== Track listing ==
All tracks composed by Patrick Sky; except where indicated

=== Side One ===
1. "She" – 2:25
2. "Dirge to Love Gone By" – 3:08
3. "I Like to Sleep Late in the Morning" (David Blue) – 2:20
4. "Circe" – 3:04
5. "Pinball Machine" (Lonnie Irving) – 3:51

=== Side Two ===
1. "Photographs" – 2:30
2. "Peter Pan" – 2:10
3. "Beggar's Riddle" – 3:18
4. "The Greater Manhattan Love Song" (Gary White) – 2:02
5. "Who Am I" – 3:03

== Personnel ==
- David Bromberg - lead guitar
- Produced and arranged by Barry Kornfeld
- except "Photographs" arranged by Bob Dorough.
- Director of Engineering: Val Valentin
- Art Direction: Sid Maurer
- Cover Photo: Robert J. Campbell
- Cover Design: Michael Mendel
