= America: A 200-Year Salute in Story and Song =

Studio album by Johnny Cash
- Released: August 7, 1972
- Recorded: July 1970
- Studio: Columbia (Nashville, Tennessee)
- Genre: Country; folk
- Length: 32:57
- Label: Columbia
- Producer: Larry Butler

Johnny Cash chronology
A Thing Called Love (1972)	America: A 200-Year Salute in Story and Song (1972)	The Johnny Cash Family Christmas (1972)

Professional ratings
Review scores
Source	Rating
Allmusic	2/5 stars
The Rolling Stone Album Guide	3/5 stars

America: A 200-Year Salute in Story and Song is a concept album and the 40th overall album by country singer Johnny Cash, released on Columbia Records in 1972 (see 1972 in music). As its title suggests, it comprises a number of tracks dedicated to the topic of American history, like several of Cash's other Americana albums. The record is a mix of songs and narration, in which Cash attempts to describe elements of the country's past, including famous personalities like Paul Revere or Big Foot. America also includes re-recordings of "Mr. Garfield", "The Road to Kaintuck", "Lorena," "Remember the Alamo" and "The Big Battle", songs previously released as singles or on albums dating back to 1959. Most of the tracks on the album were written by Cash, with some exceptions, including a rendition of the well-known song "The Battle of New Orleans" and a reading of Abraham Lincoln's famous Gettysburg Address. The album was included on the Bear Family box set Come Along and Ride This Train.

== Track listing ==
Side one
No.	Title	Writer(s)	Length
1.	"Opening Dialogue"	Johnny Cash	0:23
2.	"Paul Revere"	Johnny Cash, Glenn D. Tubb	2:17
3.	"Begin West Movement" (Dialogue)	Johnny Cash	0:26
4.	"The Road to Kaintuck"	Johnny Cash, June Carter Cash	1:21
5.	"To the Shining Mountains" (Dialogue)	Johnny Cash	0:48
6.	"The Battle of New Orleans"	Jimmie Driftwood	2:21
7.	"Southwestward" (Dialogue)	Johnny Cash	0:37
8.	"Remember the Alamo"	Jane Bowers	2:26
9.	"Opening the West" (Dialogue)	Johnny Cash	0:56
10.	"Lorena"	Charles Williams	1:50

Side two
No.	Title	Writer(s)	Length
1.	"The Gettysburg Address"	Abraham Lincoln	2:38
2.	"The West" (Dialogue)	Johnny Cash	0:57
3.	"Big Foot"	Johnny Cash	3:02
4.	"Like a Young Colt" (Dialogue)	Johnny Cash	0:38
5.	"Mister Garfield"	Ramblin' Jack Elliott	3:53
6.	"A Proud Land" (Dialogue)	Johnny Cash	0:24
7.	"The Big Battle"	Johnny Cash	3:05
8.	"On Wheels and Wings" (Dialogue)	Johnny Cash	0:30
9.	"Come Take a Trip in My Airship"	Johnny Cash	1:05
10.	"Reaching for the Stars" (Dialogue)	Johnny Cash	0:42
11.	"These Are My People"	Johnny Cash	2:38

== Personnel ==
- Johnny Cash - vocals, acoustic guitar
- Carl Perkins - electric guitar
- Bob Wootton - electric guitar, gut-string guitar
- WS Holland - drums
- Marshall Grant - bass guitar
- Red Lane - rhythm guitar, gut-string guitar
- Charles Cochran - piano
- Norman Blake - rhythm guitar, gut-string guitar, banjo
- Farrell Morris - percussion
- Charlie McCoy - harmonica, bass guitar
- Ray Edenton - rhythm guitar

== Additional personnel ==
- Produced by: Larry Butler
- Dialogue written by: Johnny Cash
- Cover design: Bill Barnes
- Cover photo: Al Clayton

== Charts ==
Album - Billboard (United States)

Year	Chart	Position
1972	Country Albums	3
1972	Top LPs & Tape	176
