= The Ballad of Boot Hill =

Song by Johnny Cash

from the album Johnny Cash Sings 'The Rebel --- Johnny Yuma'
- Released: 1959
- Label: Columbia
- Songwriter: Carl Perkins

1959 Columbia 45 EP picture sleeve, B-2155.

1959 EP 45, B-2155, released in Canada by Columbia Records.

"The Ballad of Boot Hill" is a 1959 song written by Carl Perkins which was recorded by Johnny Cash on Columbia Records.

== Background ==
The song was originally released in 1959 in the U.S. on a Columbia EP by Johnny Cash entitled Johnny Cash Sings 'The Rebel --- Johnny Yuma'. The song was also released on his 1965 LP album Sings the Ballads of the True West. The song is about the 1881 Gunfight at the O.K. Corral when three gunmen were killed by Doc Holliday, and the title refers to Boothill Graveyard. "The Ballad of Boot Hill" appeared on the 1992 Columbia collection The Essential Johnny Cash 1955-1983, a career retrospective of Johnny Cash's most important releases. The song was also released on an EP in Canada in 1959, Australia in 1960 and 1963, and in Germany in 1967.

Johnny Cash performed the song live at the London Palladium on October 27, 1968 in concert with Carl Perkins.

== Cover versions ==
"The Ballad of Boot Hill" was recorded in 1984 by country and western singer Johnny Western which appeared on his 1989 album Gunfight at the O.K. Corral on Bear Family Records. In 2008, Mark van den Berg recorded the song for his collection Mark van den Berg Sings the Hits of Johnny Cash on the Continental Record Services label. Billy McFarland recorded the song on his 2013 album Golden Guitar. Giuseppe Grasso, Jaromir Hauptman, Gabi Schaetz, Peter Medwed, Rainer Jantz, Thommy Kletsch, and Jeff Johnson have also performed the song.

== Album appearances ==
"The Ballad of Boot Hill" appears on the following Johnny Cash albums:

- Sings the Ballads of the True West (1965), Columbia Records
- Mean as Hell! (1966), Columbia
- Heart of Cash (1968), Columbia
- Walls of a Prison (1970), Harmony
- Come Along and Ride This Train (1991), Bear Family Records
- The Essential Johnny Cash 1955–1983 (1992), Sony, 1992
- Sings the Ballads of the True West/Life, Sony BMG/Sony Music Distribution, 2006
- The Music of Johnny Cash, Columbia/Legacy/Sony Music Distribution, 2009
- The Complete Columbia Album Collection, Columbia/Legacy/Sony Music Distribution, 2012
- Johnny Cash: The Box Set Series, Columbia/Legacy, 2014
