= Reality Is Bad Enough =

Studio album by Patrick Sky
- Released: 1968
- Genre: Folk
- Label: Verve Forecast
- Producer: Barry Kornfeld

Patrick Sky chronology
A Harvest of Gentle Clang (1966)	Reality Is Bad Enough (1968)	Photographs (1969)

Professional ratings
Review scores
Source	Rating
Allmusic	3/5 stars

Reality Is Bad Enough is the third album by Patrick Sky, and his first for the Verve Forecast label.

== Track listing ==
All tracks composed by Patrick Sky; except where indicated

=== Side one ===
1. "She's Up for Grabs" – 2:46
2. "Children's Song" – 2:37
3. "Silly Song" – 2:18
4. "Sometimes I Wonder" – 3:39
5. "I Don't Feel That's Real" – 3:27
6. "Enjoy, Enjoy" * – 2:47

=== Side two ===
1. "Follow the Longhaired Lady" – 2:51
2. "The Loving Kind" – 3:22
3. "The Dance of Death" – 3:21
4. "Modern Major General" (W. S. Gilbert, Arthur Sullivan; adapted by Patrick Sky) – 3:35
5. "Jimmy Clay" – 4:31

== Personnel ==
- Produced and arranged by Barry Kornfeld
- (*) Arranged by Stuart Scharf
- Recording Engineer: Richard Anderson
- Director of Engineering: Val Valentin
- Cover Photo: Bob Campbell
- Art Direction: David Krieger
- All selections composed by Patrick Sky, except "Modern Major General" (adapted from a Gilbert and Sullivan song)
- All, selections published by Rabelaisian Music, Inc. (BMI)
