= Down to Us =

Studio album by Patrick Sky and Cathy Sky
- Released: 2009
- Genre: Folk

Patrick Sky and Cathy Sky chronology
Through a Window (1985)	Down to Us (2009)

Down to Us is a 2009 album of traditional Irish music performed by Patrick Sky (on uilleann pipes) and Cathy Sky (on fiddle).

== Track listing ==
1. Reels: The Girl That Broke My Heart/ Callaghan's/ Connaught Heffer
2. Set dance:jig; The Drunken Gauger/ Jackson's
3. Reels: Galtee Ranger/Speed the Plough/Stewart's Longbow (reels)
4. Marsáil an Fhiadh (The Deer's March)
5. Jigs: The New House/Slopes of Sliabh Luachra/Dan Collins’Favorite
6. Hornpipes: The Stranger/ Pol Ha’Penny
7. Jigs: West Clare Jigs: Scully Casey's/The Yellow Wattle (fiddle solo)
8. Reels: Paddy on the Lake/Sailing Into Walpole's Marsh/Lad O’Beirne's
9. Jigs: Phillip Martin's/Newport Lasses
10. Reels: Land of Sunshine/Lori Cole's Dawn
11. Reels: The Scholar/Miss Monaghan's (piping solo)
12. Hornpipes: Plains of Boyle/The Fairy's Hornpipe
13. Reels: Cat That Ate the Candle/Reck's Farewell to Erin/The (old) Woman of the House
14. The Blackbird Suite
15. The Old Bush Reel/Spike Island Lasses
16. Aisling Gheal
