= Boothill Graveyard (Tombstone, Arizona) =

Cemetery

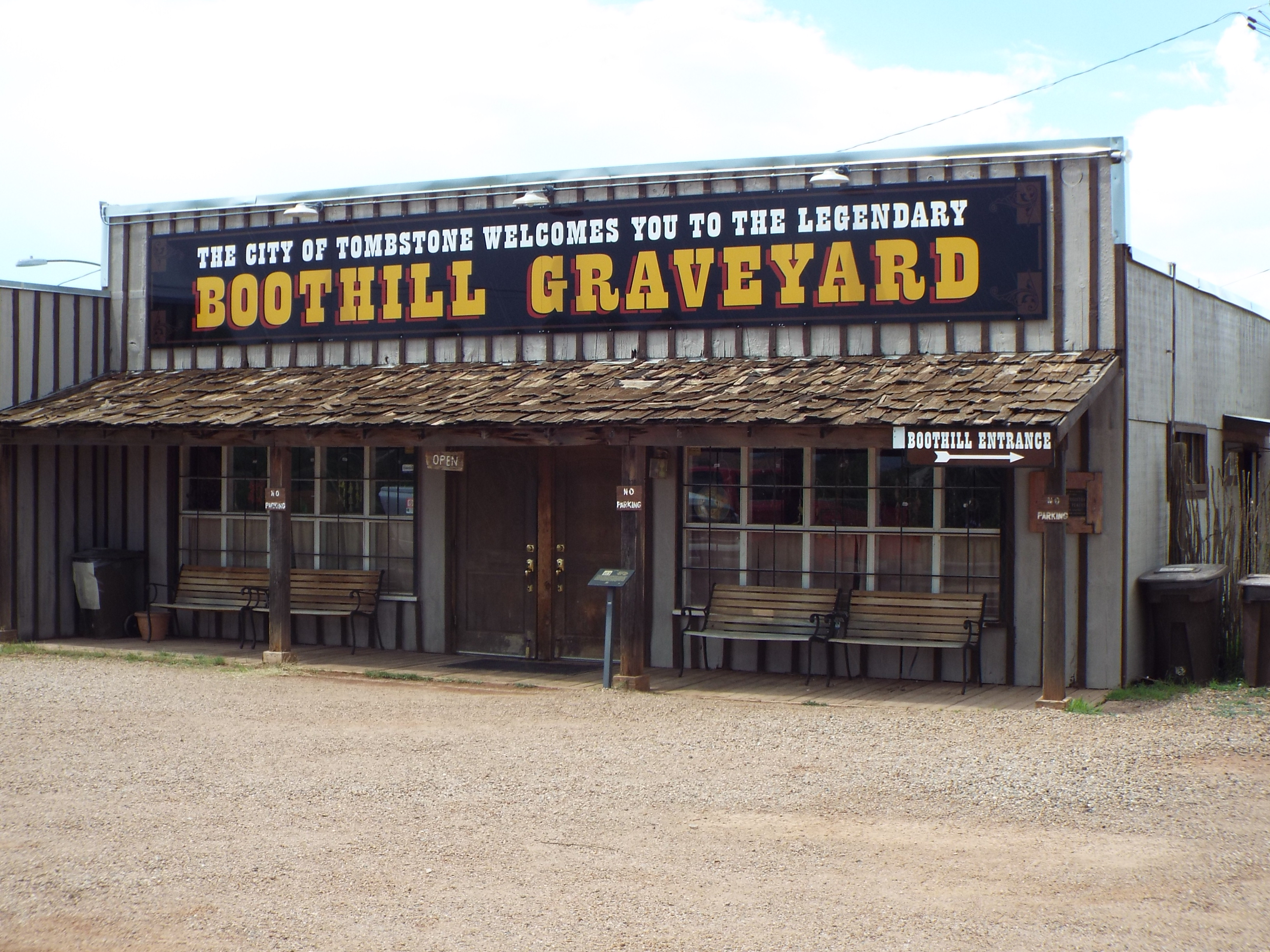
- Boothill Graveyard
- Interactive map of Boothill Graveyard

Details
- Established: 1878
- Location: Tombstone, Arizona
- Country: United States
- Coordinates: 31°43′12″N 110°04′13″W
- No. of interments: At least 250
- Website: official website – managed by the City of Tombstone https://cityoftombstoneaz.gov

Boothill Graveyard is a small graveyard of at least 250 interments located in Tombstone, Cochise County, Arizona. Also known as the "Old City Cemetery", the graveyard was used after 1883 only to bury outlaws and a few others. It had a separate Jewish cemetery, which is nearby.

"Boot Hill" refers to the number of men who died with their boots on. Among a number of pioneer Boot Hill cemeteries in the Old West, Tombstone is among the best-known, and it is one of the city's most popular tourist attractions. It is the subject of The Ballad of Boot Hill by Johnny Cash.

== History ==
Originally called Boothill Cemetery, the graveyard was founded in 1878. After a new city cemetery was built elsewhere, the old cemetery stopped accepting new burials in about 1883 (save for very few exceptions) and fell into disrepair until the 1940s, when the city began to restore and preserve it.

== Notable interments and grave markers ==
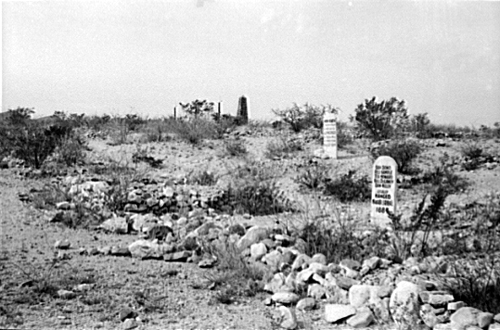
Boothill Graveyard in 1940, before it was fully restored

- Marshal Fred White, killed by Curly Bill Brocius on October 30, 1880.
- Mary Clum, first wife of former Tombstone Mayor John Clum, died after giving birth on December 18, 1880. When John visited Tombstone for the first Helldorado celebration in 1929, he was unable to locate the grave of Mary, due to neglect of grave markers and theft of these wooden relics as souvenirs.
- Tom McLaury, Frank McLaury, and Billy Clanton, killed in the O.K. Corral shootout on October 26, 1881.
- Dan "Big Dan" Dowd, Omer W. "Red" Sample, James "Tex" Howard, William E. "Billy" Delaney, and Daniel "York" Kelly, perpetrators of the Bisbee massacre, legally hanged on March 28, 1884. John Heath, accused of organizing the robbery leading to the massacre, has a grave marker nearby but his body was actually returned to his hometown in Terrell, Texas.
- Jack Dunlop aka "Three Fingered Jack" died of wounds on February 24, 1900, after an attempted holdup.
- China Mary a.k.a. Mrs. Ah Lum. According to True West Magazine China Mary managed a well-stocked general store where she dealt in both American and Chinese goods. Mary was also a money lender and she used her own judgment to determine borrower's credibility. When Mary died of heart failure in 1906, the town folks had a large turnout for her service. She was buried in Tombstone's Boothill Cemetery.
- John Slaughter Swain, former slave of Judge Slaughter, who became a cowboy and notable multi-decade resident of the town and one of the last burials in the graveyard.

=== Notable grave markers but fictitious burials ===
In order to attract tourists, some of the Boot Hill grave sites are falsely marked, and fictitious claims of burials have been made by the cemetery's various operators over the years.

- Lester Moore, with the famous epitaph "Here lies Lester Moore, Four slugs from a .44, No Les No more." Lester Moore was purportedly a Wells, Fargo & Co. station agent in the border town of Naco (Arizona) where he also died in 1880 during a shootout with Hank Dunstan over a mangled package. There is no evidence to indicate where Dunstan (who also died in the purported shootout) was buried. While some sources claim that there was never anyone named Lester Moore who was killed in Arizona Territory.
- John Heath, accused of organizing the robbery that led to the 1883 Bisbee massacre, has a grave marker near the grave of the five perpetrators of the massacre. John Heath was arrested and convicted, and was later removed by a mob from the Tombstone jail and lynched on February 22, 1884. However, he was not buried in Boothill Cemetery; his body was returned to his estranged wife in Terrell, Texas, and was buried there in Oakland Cemetery.
- Thomas Harper is another badman supposedly buried in Boothill Cemetery. He was a friend of Curly Bill Brocius and was hanged for murder by Sheriff Bob Paul in Tucson on July 8, 1881. Harper was buried in Tucson, not in Tombstone.
- Federico Duran, spelled as "Fiderico Doran" on the grave marker, who was claimed to have been killed by Sheriff John Slaughter after the Agua Zarca train robbery in 1888. In fact, Duran and train robber Jack Taylor were executed by firing squad in Guaymas, Mexico in December 1889. Slaughter had nothing to do with their deaths and Duran was not buried in Tombstone.

== Images of notable graves ==
The following are the images of some of the notable graves in the historic Boothill Graveyard.

Notable graves
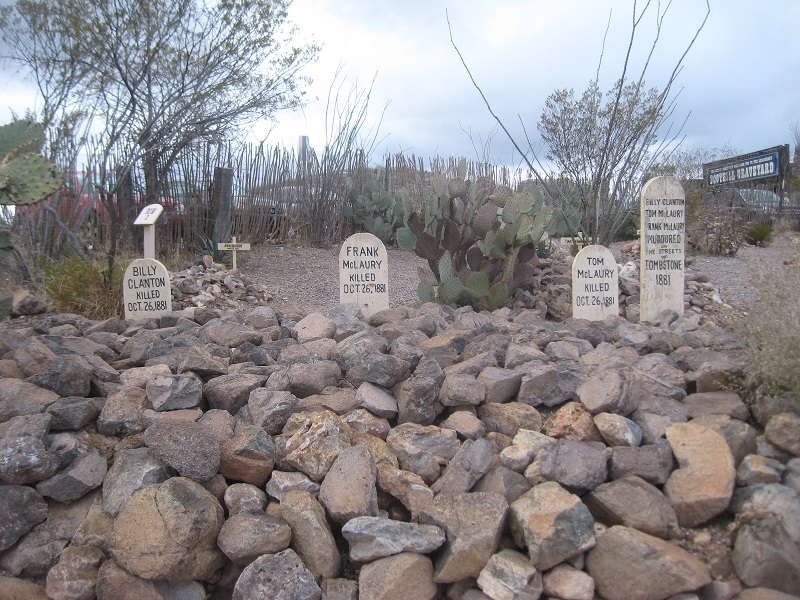
The graves of Billy Clanton, Frank McLaury and Tom McLaury.

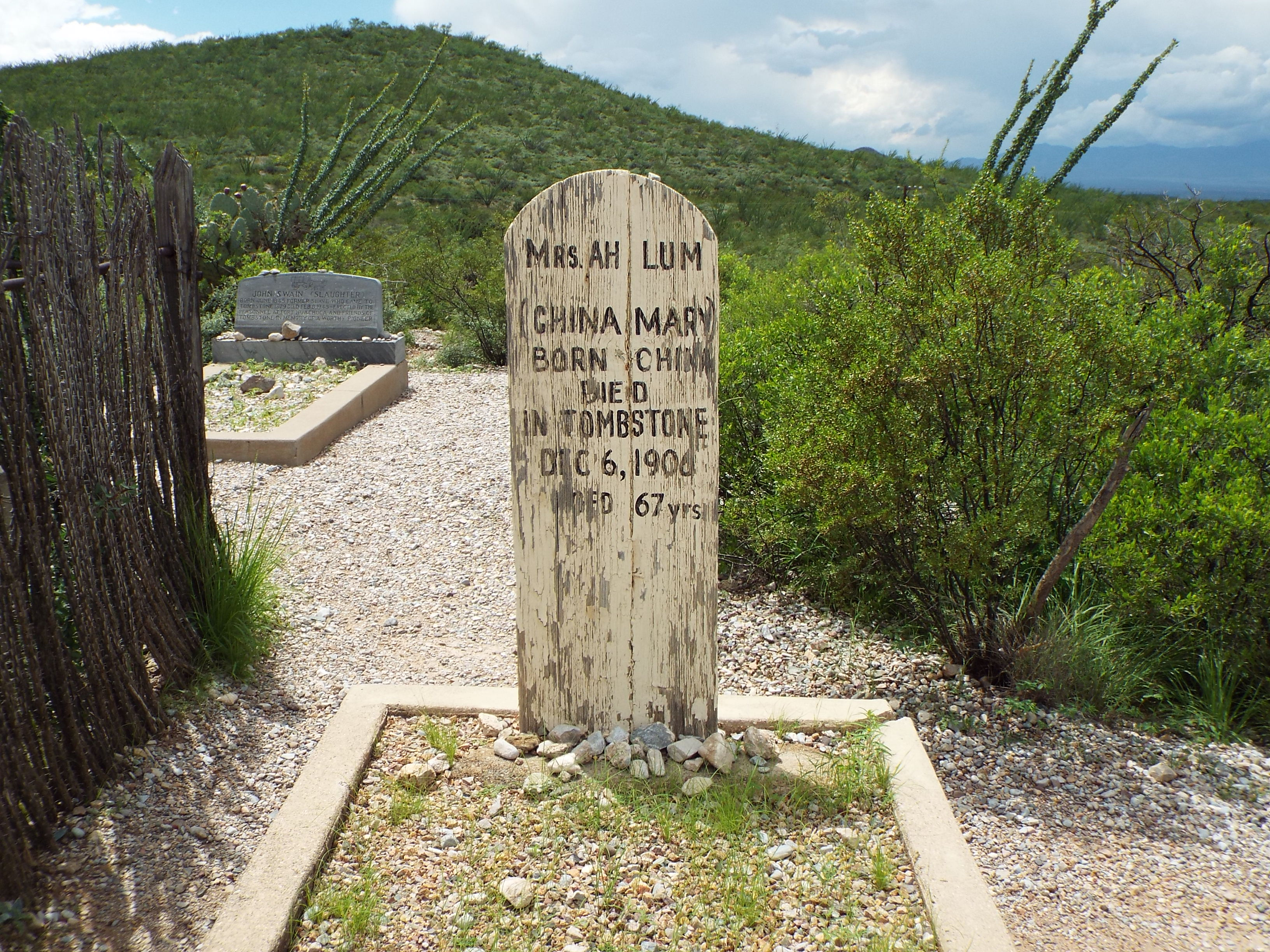
China Mary

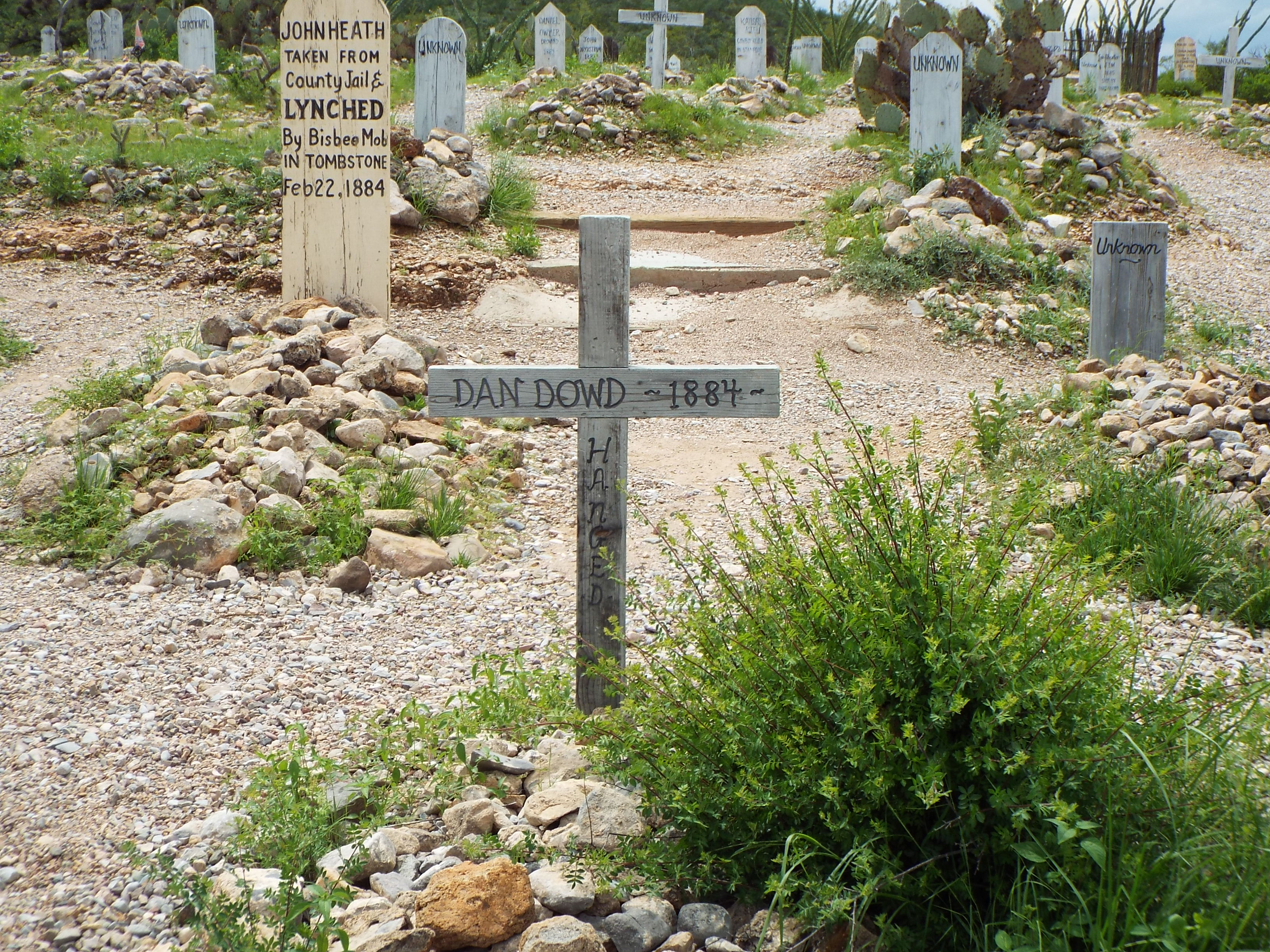
Dan Dowd

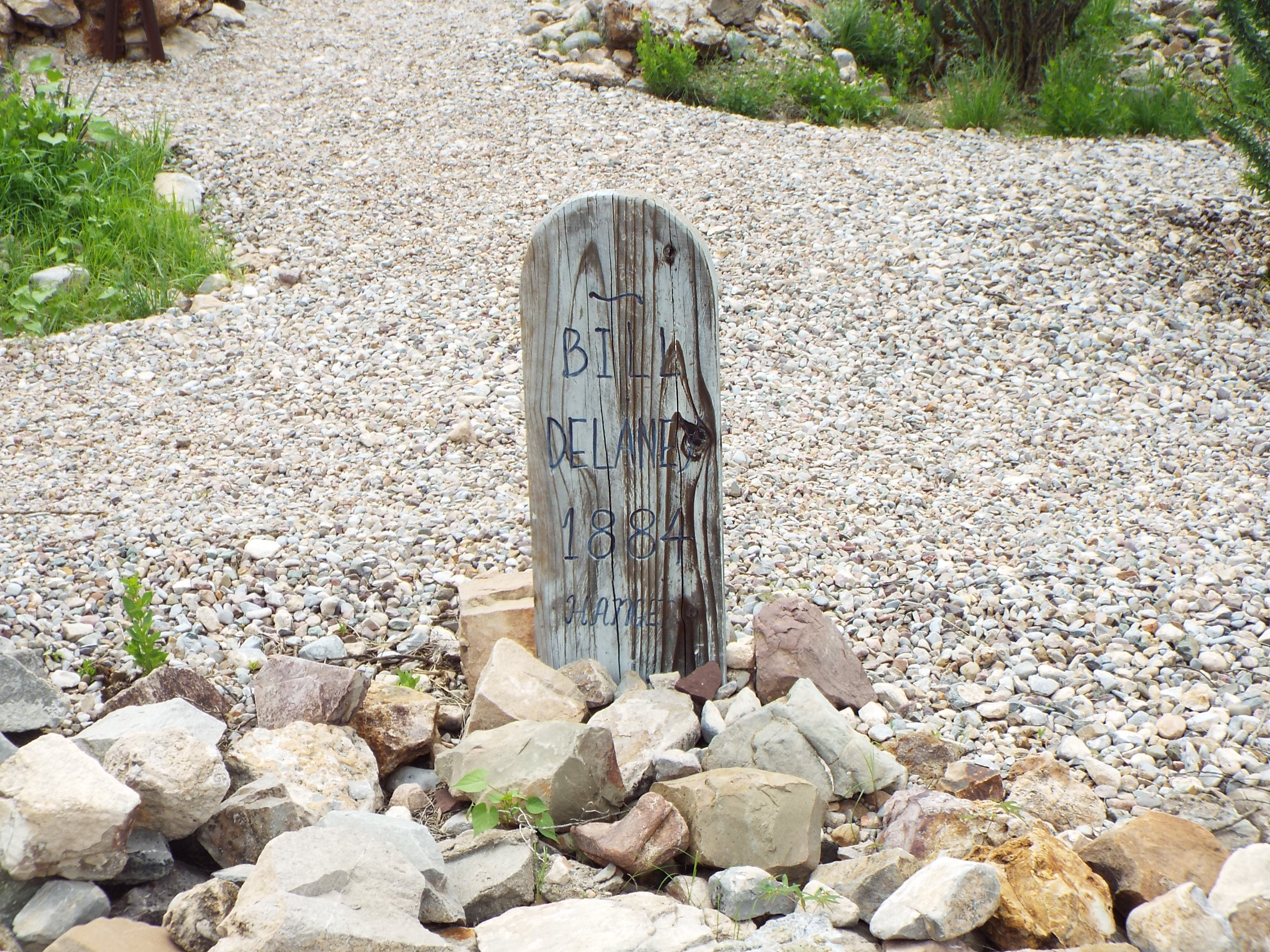
Bill Delaney

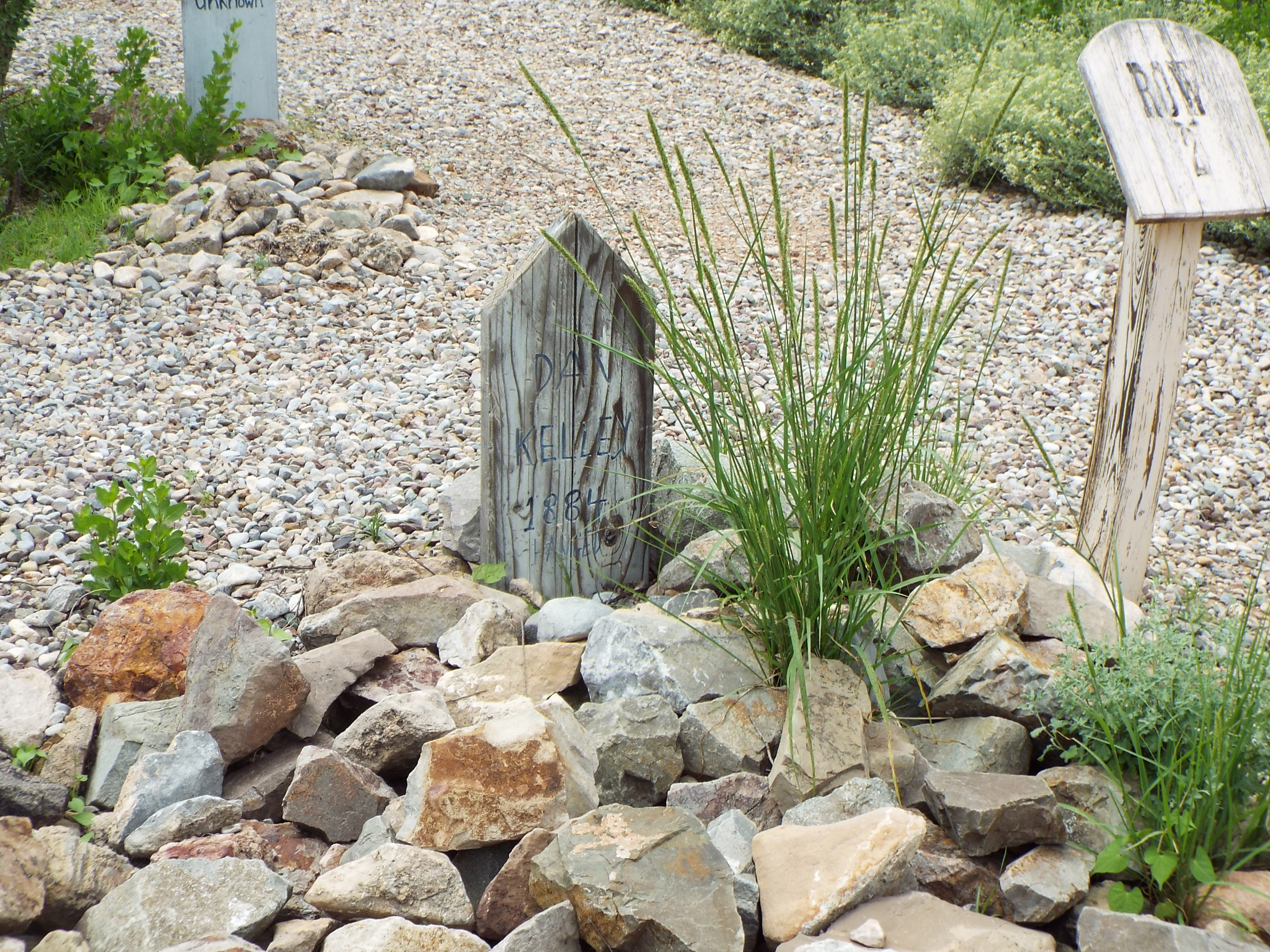
Dan Kelley

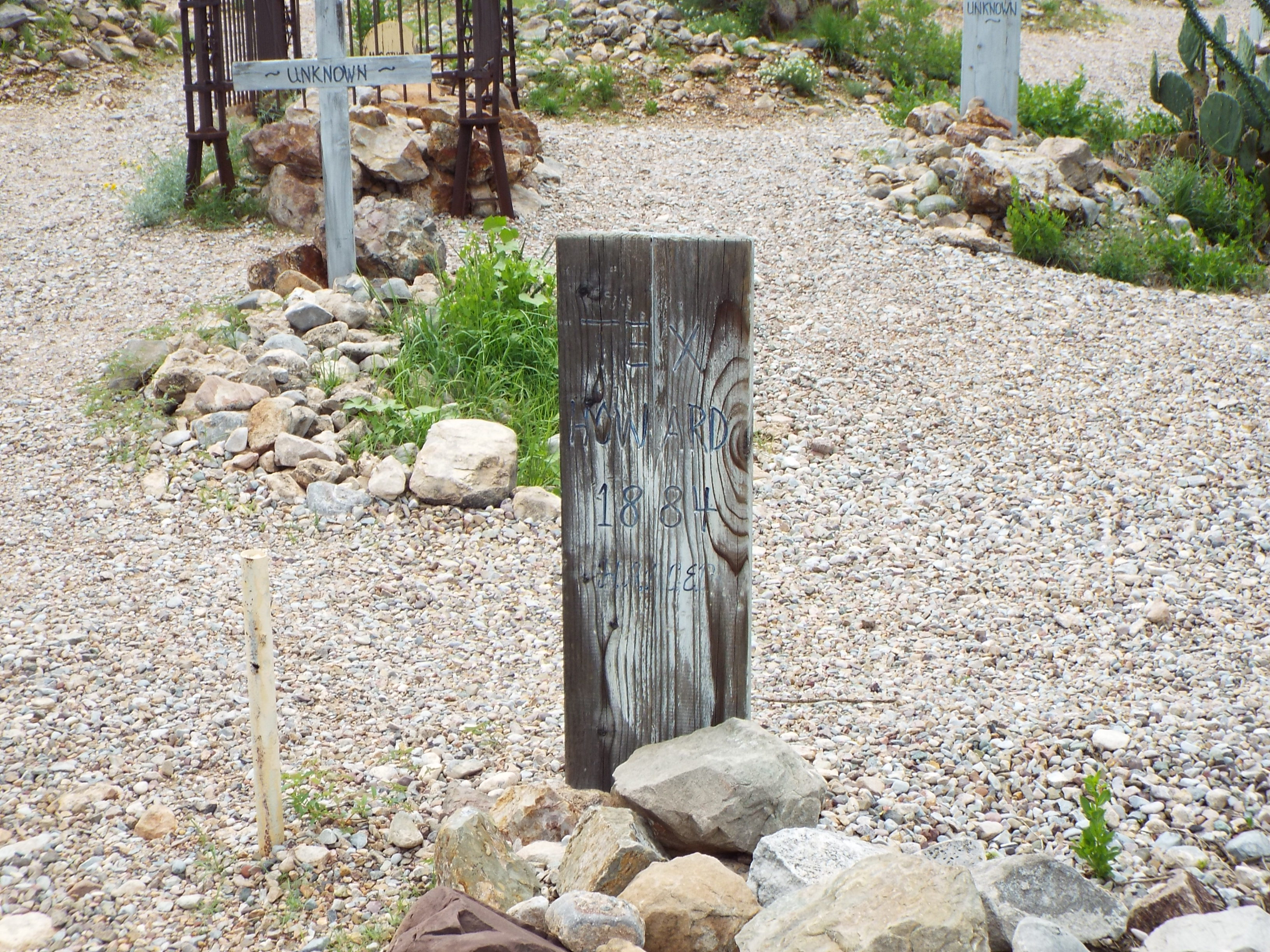
Tex Howard

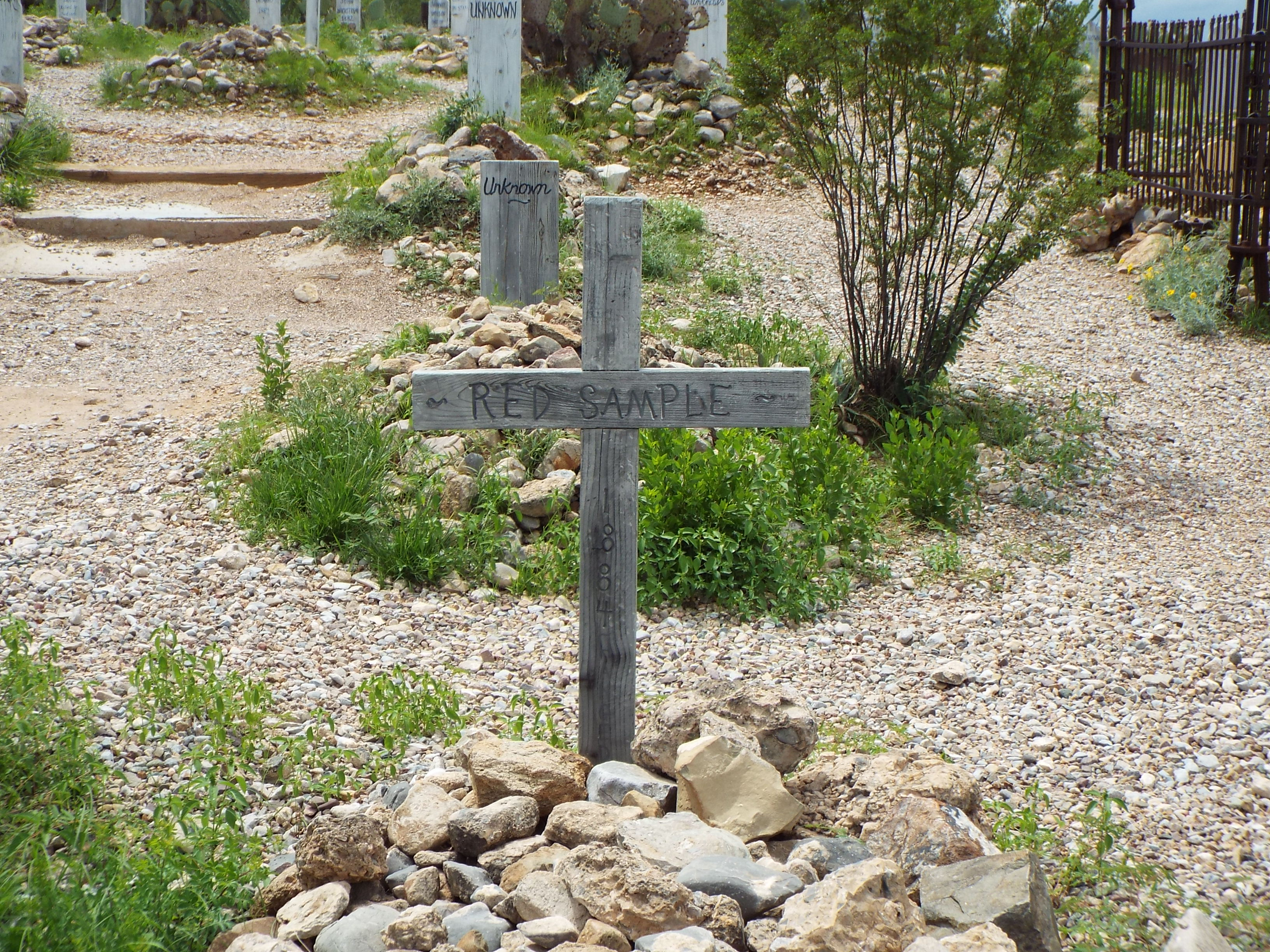
Omer W. "Red" Sample
