= Bitter Tears: Ballads of the American Indian =

Studio album by Johnny Cash
- Released: October 26, 1964
- Recorded: March 5 – June 30, 1964
- Genres: Country; folk
- Length: 31:13
- Label: Columbia
- Producers: Don Law; Frank Jones

Johnny Cash chronology
I Walk the Line (1964)	Bitter Tears: Ballads of the American Indian (1964)	Original Sun Sound of Johnny Cash (1964)

Singles from Bitter Tears: Ballads of the American Indian
- 1. "The Ballad of Ira Hayes" Released: June 2, 1964

Professional ratings
Review scores
Source	Rating
AllMusic	link
Rolling Stone	favourable
The Rolling Stone Album Guide	2/5 stars

Bitter Tears: Ballads of the American Indian is a 1964 concept album, the twelfth album released by singer Johnny Cash on Columbia Records. It is one of several Americana records by Cash. This one focuses on the history of Native Americans in the United States and their problems. Cash assumed that his ancestry included Cherokee, which partly inspired his work on this recording. The songs in this album address the harsh and unfair treatment of the indigenous peoples of North America by Europeans in the United States. Two deal with 20th-century issues affecting the Seneca and Pima peoples. It was considered controversial and was rejected by some radio stations and fans.

In 2014 a tribute album, Look Again to the Wind: Johnny Cash's Bitter Tears Revisited, was released with contributions by Gillian Welch, Dave Rawlings, Emmylou Harris, Bill Miller, and others. This was also the name of a documentary film about the suppression of Cash's Native American-themed album in the 1960s. This aired on PBS in February and November 2016.

== Songwriting ==
"The Talking Leaves" is about Sequoyah inventing written words in 1821, which increased Cherokee literacy.

== Reception ==
Bitter Tears and one single were successful, the album rising to No. 2 and "The Ballad of Ira Hayes", reaching No. 3 on the Billboard Hot Country Singles chart. But this required effort. Though the song started out quickly on the Billboard chart, seven weeks later the song was floundering in the mid-teens. According to later accounts, by stressing the Native American theme, Cash had entered contemporary controversial social issues and upheaval of the period. He encountered resistance to this work.

"Facing censorship and an angry backlash from radio stations, DJs and fans for speaking out on behalf of Native people, Cash decided to fight back." He paid for a full-page ad that appeared in the August 22, 1964, issue of Billboard, calling some DJs and programmers "gutless" for not playing the Ira Hayes song, and asking why they were afraid to do so. He left the question unanswered.

Cash began a campaign to support the Ira Hayes song, buying and sending out more than 1,000 copies to radio stations across America. By September 19, the song had reached number 3 in Billboard.

In 2010, the Western Writers of America chose "The Ballad of Ira Hayes" as one of the Top 100 Western songs of all time.

== Track listing ==
Side one
No.	Title	Writer(s)	Length
1.	"As Long as the Grass Shall Grow"	Peter La Farge	6:10
2.	"Apache Tears"	Cash	2:34
3.	"Custer"	La Farge	2:20
4.	"The Talking Leaves"	Cash	3:55

Side two
No.	Title	Writer(s)	Length
5.	"The Ballad of Ira Hayes"	La Farge	4:07
6.	"Drums"	La Farge	5:04
7.	"White Girl"	La Farge	3:01
8.	"The Vanishing Race"	Cash, Johnny Horton	4:02

== Personnel ==
- Johnny Cash - vocals, guitar
- Luther Perkins, Norman Blake, Bob Johnson - guitar
- Marshall Grant - bass
- W.S. Holland - drums
- The Carter Family - vocal accompaniment

Additional personnel

- Produced by: Don Law and Frank Jones
- Cover Photo: Bob Cato
- Reissue Producer: Bob Irwin
- Digitally Mastered by: Vic Anesini, Sony Music Studios, NY (CD Reissue)
- Liner Notes: Hugh Cherry

== Charts ==
Album – Billboard (United States)

Year	Chart	Position
1964	Country Albums	2
1964	Pop Albums	47

Singles - Billboard (United States)

Year	Single	Chart	Position
1964	"The Ballad of Ira Hayes"	Country Singles	3

== Reissue and revival ==
The album was included on the Bear Family Records box set Come Along and Ride This Train in 1984.

In 2011, after Antonino D'Ambrosio published A Heartbeat and a Guitar: Johnny Cash and the Making of Bitter Tears, there was renewed interest in the album. D'Ambrosio acted as executive producer, and also made a documentary film about the re-recording of the songs by various artists, who were chosen for their personal interest in the album. Called Look Again To The Wind: Johnny Cash’s Bitter Tears Revisited, the album was released by Sony Masterworks in 2014.

The documentary is We're Still Here: Johnny Cash's Bitter Tears Revisited. It first aired on PBS on February 1, 2016, and was scheduled to re-air in November 2016.

=== Song listing ===
Performers shown in brackets:

- "As Long as the Grass Shall Grow" (Gillian Welch & David Rawlings)
- "Apache Tears" (Emmylou Harris w/the Milk Carton Kids)
- "Custer" (Steve Earle w/the Milk Carton Kids)
- "The Talking Leaves" (Nancy Blake w/Emmylou Harris, Gillian Welch and David Rawlings)
- "The Ballad of Ira Hayes" (Kris Kristofferson w/Gillian Welch and David Rawlings)
- "Drums" (Norman Blake w/Nancy Blake, Emmylou Harris, Gillian Welch and David Rawlings)
- "Apache Tears (Reprise)" (Gillian Welch and David Rawlings)
- "White Girl" (Milk Carton Kids)
- "The Vanishing Race" (Rhiannon Giddens) Additional words by Rhiannon Giddens
- "As Long as the Grass Shall Grow (Reprise)" (Nancy Blake, Gillian Welch and David Rawlings)
- "Look Again to the Wind" (Bill Miller) Peter La Farge song not included on the original album.
