= Songs That Made America Famous =

Studio album by Patrick Sky
- Released: 1973
- Genre: Folk
- Label: Adelphi
- Producer: Alex Bennett, Patrick Sky

Patrick Sky chronology
Photographs (1969)	Songs That Made America Famous (1973)	Two Steps Forward, One Step Back (1975)

Professional ratings
Review scores
Source	Rating
Allmusic	link

Songs That Made America Famous is the fifth album by Patrick Sky, released on Adelphi Records in 1973. Sky recorded the album in 1971 but had difficulty finding a label to release it, as the satirical lyrics are explicit.

== Track listing ==
All songs by Patrick Sky unless otherwise noted.

=== Side One ===
1. "Fight for Liberation"
2. "Radcliffe Highway"
3. "Vatican Caskets"
4. "Child Molesting Blues"
5. "Okie"
6. "Under All Flag"
7. "Luang Prabang" (Dave Van Ronk)

=== Side two ===
1. "Our Baby Die"
2. "Ramblin' Hunchback"
3. "Bake Dat Chicken Pie" (Dumont)
4. "Rock Star"
5. "The Pope" (Mike Hunt)
6. "Yonkers Girl "
7. "H. Bromovitz"
