= Two Steps Forward, One Step Back =

Studio album by Patrick Sky
- Released: 1975
- Genre: Folk
- Label: Leviathan
- Producer: Patrick Sky

Patrick Sky chronology
Songs That Made America Famous (1973)	Two Steps Forward, One Step Back (1975)	Through a Window (1985)

Professional ratings
Review scores
Source	Rating
Allmusic	3/5 stars

Two Steps Forward, One Step Back is the sixth album by Patrick Sky, released as SLIF 2000 on Leviathan Records, identified as "[a] division of Innisfree Inc." on the back sleeve. The sleeve notes and front cover title are a reproduction of Sky's own handwriting, notable especially for his misspelling the word forward as foreward [sic], though the standard spelling is found on the two sticker labels of the LP itself. The record is noteworthy also because it includes a piano-driven re-recording of Sky's signature song, "Many a Mile," and because of "My Friend Robert," later recorded by George Thorogood. Dedicated "[t]o the loving memory of Mississippi John Hurt," the album features not only a cover photo of the fingerpicking legend with Sky (who produced Hurt's Vanguard albums), but also covers of three John Hurt songs. Other highlights include a cover of Bascom Lamar Lunsford's "I Wish I Was a Mole In the Ground" (Lunsford's version is included in Harry Smith's Anthology of American Folk Music) and lighthearted rhinological commentary about David Bromberg in the Sky original "Lucky Me." The album also includes a performance of Sky playing "Lost James Whalen," featuring Sky's vocals as well as his playing of the uilleann pipes.

The cover bears a distinct similarity to Paul Simon's Still Crazy After All These Years album cover, with the wide buff matting, the hand-written heading of the artist's name and album title, the re-touched and colorized low-rez photo in the center. Both were released in 1975, although Sky's album was released a few months earlier than Simon's.

== Track listing ==
=== Side one ===
1. "Many a Mile"
2. "Lucky Me"
3. "Perryville Reel, Rhode Island Reel"
4. "My Friend Robert"
5. "Frankie and Albert"
6. "Mole in the Ground"

=== Side two ===
1. "Payday"
2. "Candy Man"
3. "To Find a Way"
4. "Danville Girl"
5. "Moanin' Blues"
6. "Lost James Whalen"

== Personnel ==
- Eddie Wright - bass
- Bud Morrissoe - Fiddle
- Gordon Titcomb - Bars, piano
- Lar Anderson - Drums
- Buzz Kuhar - Drums
- Patrick Sky - Guitar, 12 String [,] Uilleann Pipes, Banjo, Dulcimer, Moans and Vocal Incantations

Production notes:

- Executive Producer - Lisa Null
- Produced & Arranged - Patrick Sky
- Engineered by - Pitt Kinsolving
- Cover photo - Bob Campbell
- Layout & Design - Joe Szarek, Patrick Sky, Butch Lockwood
