= Mister Garfield =

Single by Johnny Cash

from the album Johnny Cash Sings the Ballads of the True West
- A-side: "Mister Garfield" "The Streets of Laredo"
- Released: 1965
- Genre: country
- Length: 3:03
- Label: Columbia 4-43313
- Songwriters: J. Elliot; arr: Johnny Cash
- Producers: Don Law and Frank Jones

Audio
- "Mister Garfield" on YouTube

"Mister Garfield" is a traditional song sometimes credited to Ramblin' Jack Elliott.

== Content ==
The song is about the assassination of U.S. President James A. Garfield by Charles Guiteau at the Baltimore and Potomac Railroad Station in Washington on July 2, 1881.

== Johnny Cash version ==
Johnny Cash recorded it on Columbia Records for his 1965 double album Johnny Cash Sings the Ballads of the True West.

Released in June 1965 as the first and only single from the yet-to-be-released album (Columbia 4-43313, with "The Streets of Laredo" on the opposite side), it reached number 15 on the U.S. Billboard country chart and number 17 on the Cash Box country chart.

Later Cash sang the song on his album America (1972).

=== Background and lyrical analysis ===
When researching song titles for inclusion on Johnny Cash Sings Ballads of the True West, Cash [...] combed through the repertoires of contemporary artists who performed authentic cowboy songs, such as Elliott, who taught Cash "The Death of Mister Garfield," the odd ballad recorded by the Rambling Boys in 1957 that eerily, and casually, details the assassination of President James A. Garfield by Charles Guiteau in 1881. Cash was intrigued by the song and wrote in the notes, "This song was brought to me by folksinger Jack Elliott.... It is eighty years old and to my knowledge has never been recorded." The song had been recorded by both Bascom Lamar Lunsford and Derroll Adams, but it was obvious that Cash learned the song firsthand from Elliott himself. Cash could not help but tool with the song's lyrics, and the version he eventually waxed for Columbia shared only occasional similarities with earlier versions. Oddly, Columbia wrongly assigned the writing credit of the “Mr. Garfield” ballad to Elliott.

— Hank Reineke. Ramblin' Jack Elliott: The Never-Ending Highway

Brooklyn-born folk singer Ramblin' Jack Elliott wrote “Mister Garfield” about the 1881 shooting of President James A. Garfield in broad daylight at a railroad depot. A man named Charles J. Guiteau shot Garfield, and the story is told from the point of view of a young man who is shocked to hear about the assassination. The boy talks his brother into going with him to see the ailing president. The boy is saddened to learn that the president ultimately died from his wounds. Elliott originally had presented the song to Cash as "The Ballad of Charles Guiteau," but Cash preferred the title “Mister Garfield.” The song was the only single released from this album, and it climbed to number 15 on the country chart.

— John M. Alexander. The Man in Song: A Discographic Biography of Johnny Cash

== Track listing ==
7" single (Columbia 4-43313, 1965)
No.	Title	Writer(s)	Length
1.	"The Streets of Laredo"	Arr.: Johnny Cash	3:09
2.	"Mister Garfield"	J. Elliot; arr.: Johnny Cash	3:03

== Charts ==
Chart (1965)	Peak position
US Hot Country Songs (Billboard)	15
