= A Harvest of Gentle Clang =

Studio album by Patrick Sky
- Released: 1966
- Genre: Folk
- Label: Vanguard

Patrick Sky chronology
Patrick Sky (1965)	A Harvest of Gentle Clang (1966)	Reality Is Bad Enough (1968)

Professional ratings
Review scores
Source	Rating
Allmusic	link

A Harvest of Gentle Clang is the second album by Patrick Sky, dedicated to Buffy Sainte-Marie.

== History ==
With tracks such as "Jay Gould's Daughter," "John Riley" and "Farmer's Cursed Wife" (a re-working of "Old Lady and the Devil" by Bill & Belle Reed, whose version is included in Harry Smith's Anthology of American Folk Music), the album is part traditional folk album and part vehicle for Sky's wry sense of humour. (The latter quality is represented by tracks such as "Good Old Man," a spoken word advertisement for Ajax and a punning cameo by Mississippi John Hurt.) The Ajax reference was perhaps an allusion to the similarity between Vanguard Records' knight-on-horse logo and Ajax's use of a similar image in its 1960s advertising. The album's clever title and Hurt's brief appearance receive special mention in Dave Van Ronk's posthumously published autobiography, in which Van Ronk writes warmly about his friend Sky. On the album, Sky alludes to Van Ronk before "St. Louis Tickle," which Sky says he "learned from a walking piano roll with a beard." A portion of the original liner notes is also attributed to "Terri Van Ronk and Dave."

Never having been released on CD, the album was once available as a Vanguard Digital Vault album available for download through iTunes (with seven bonus tracks) but is currently unavailable.

== Track listing ==
=== Side One ===
1. "Jay Gould's Daughter" (Traditional)
2. "A Girl I Once Did Own" (Patrick Sky)
3. "Are You From Dixie, 'Cause I'm From Dixie Too"* (George Cobb, Jack Yellen)
4. "Cape Cod Girls" (Traditional)
5. "Good Old Man" (Traditional)
6. "Keep On Walkin'"* (Patrick Sky)

=== Side Two ===
1. "Mahogany Row" (Ernie Marrs)
2. "St. Louis Tickle" (Traditional; arranged by Patrick Sky)
3. "Farmer's Cursed Wife" (Traditional)
4. "John Riley" (Traditional; with additional verses by Patrick Sky)
5. "Give to the Cause"* (Patrick Sky)
6. "Need Somebody On Your Bond" (Traditional; with additional words and music by Patrick Sky)

== Bonus Tracks on iTunes download ==
1. "Mahogany Row" (Alternative take)
2. "She Moved through the Fair"
3. "One Grain of Sand"
4. "One Sunday Eve"
5. "Candyman"
6. "Words without Music" (Alternative take from Sky's self-titled debut)
7. "Nectar of God" (Alternative take from Sky's self-titled debut)

== Personnel ==
- Patrick Sky – vocals, guitar, harmonica; 12-string guitar on "Keep On Walkin'"; banjo on "Give to the Cause"
- Barry Kornfeld – guitar
- Sean O'Brien – bass
- Elmer Jared Gordon – piano, musical director
- Bob Yellin – banjo on "Are You from Dixie, 'Cause I'm from Dixie Too" and "Keep On Walkin'"
- Lucy Brown – Jew's harp on "Are You from Dixie, 'Cause I'm from Dixie Too" and "Give to the Cause"
- Norman Grossman – drums
- Lowell Levinger – banjo
- Maynard Solomon – triangle on "Keep On Walkin'"

Technical

- Jules Halfant - design
- Bob Carrington - front cover photography
