= Katy Too =

Single by Johnny Cash and the Tennessee Two

from the album Greatest!
- A-side: "Katy Too" "I Forgot to Remember to Forget"
- Released: June 1959
- Genre: Rockabilly
- Label: Sun 321
- Songwriters: Jack Clement, Johnny Cash

Johnny Cash and the Tennessee Two singles chronology
"Frankie's Man, Johnny" (1959)	"Katy Too" (1959)	"I Got Stripes" (1959)

Music video
- "Katy Too" (audio only) on YouTube

Professional ratings
Review scores
Source	Rating
Billboard	Spotlight winner of the week

"Katy Too" is a song co-written and originally recorded by Johnny Cash.

The song was recorded by Cash at Sun Records on May 28, 1958, and released by Sun as a single (Sun 321, with "I Forgot to Remember to Forget" on the opposite side) in June 1959, when he had already left the label for Columbia.

== Composition ==
"Katy Too," cowritten by Cash and Clement, would be the last song Cash wrote or cowrote for Sun. The prevailing thought was that Cash was saving his new compositions for Columbia, where he would begin recording a few months later. "Katy Too" is a light, clever play on words, in which the singer lists all his girlfriends and what each does best. Although he can't make up his mind, and would like to marry all of them, he still misses "ol' Katy," too. It was released as a single by Sun in 1959, and reached number 11 on the country chart and number 66 pop.

— John M. Alexander. The Man in Song: A Discographic Biography of Johnny Cash.

== Charts ==
Chart (1959)	Peak position
US Billboard Hot 100	66
US Hot Country Songs (Billboard)	11
