= Patrick Sky =

American musician and record producer (1940–2021)

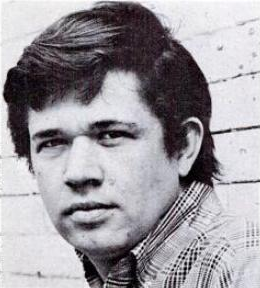
- Patrick Sky in 1966

Background information
- Born: Patrick Linch; October 2, 1940; College Park, Georgia, U.S.
- Died: May 26, 2021 (aged 80) Asheville, North Carolina, U.S.
- Instruments: guitar, banjo, harmonica
- Website: patricksky.com Does not seem to be active

Patrick Sky (born Patrick Linch; October 2, 1940 – May 26, 2021) was an American musician, folk singer, songwriter, and record producer. He was of Irish and Native American ancestry, and played Irish traditional music and uilleann pipes in the later part of his career.

== Early life ==
Sky was born in College Park, Georgia, on October 2, 1940. He was of Muscogee and Irish descent. He grew up near the Lafourche Swamps of Louisiana, where he learned guitar, banjo, and harmonica. He moved to New York City after military service in the early 1960s, and began playing traditional folk songs in clubs before starting to write his own material.

== Career ==
A close contemporary of Dave Van Ronk, Tom Paxton, Phil Ochs and others in the Greenwich Village folk boom, Sky released four well received albums from 1965 to 1969. He played with many of the leading performers of the period, particularly Buffy Sainte-Marie, Eric Andersen and the blues singer Mississippi John Hurt (whose Vanguard albums Sky produced). Sky's song "Many a Mile" became a folk club staple; with recordings by Sainte-Marie and others.

Being politically radical, Sky wrote, recorded, and released the satirical Songs That Made America Famous in 1973 (the album was recorded in 1971 but rejected by several record companies before it found a home). This album featured the earliest known recorded version of the song "Luang Prabang", written by Sky's friend Dave Van Ronk. Sky had honed his politically charged satire in earlier albums, but Songs That Made America Famous raised the stakes. The Adelphi Records website describes how the content was, indeed, shocking, yet how several critics encouraged the public to rush and buy these timely and brilliant "explicit lyrics" while it could.

Sky gradually moved into the field of Irish traditional music, producing artists, and founding Green Linnet Records in 1973. He was recognised as an expert in building and playing the Irish uilleann pipes, often performing with his wife, Cathy. The "Around Carolina" Time Warner cable TV series in 2011 featured his role in reviving pipe making, crediting him with "bringing the Irish Uilleann Pipes back from the brink of extinction" in the 1970s. Sky said to learn to make pipes he also had to make some of the tools necessary to make the pipes. He wrote a booklet titled "The Insane Art of Reedmaking," which he described as a necessary skill for pipers. Sky edited a reissued version of the important 19th century dance tune book Ryan's Mammoth Collection in 1995. This was followed up with a reissue of Howe's 1000 Jigs and Reels six years later.

Sky released his final full-length studio album, Through a Window, in 1985.

== Personal life ==
Sky married Cathy Larson Sky in 1981. They met three years earlier and moved to North Carolina six years after getting married. Together, they had one child, Liam.

Sky died on May 26, 2021, while in hospice care in Asheville, North Carolina. He was 80, and suffered from prostate cancer and bone cancer prior to his death. He had also been diagnosed with Parkinson's disease in 2017.

== Discography ==
For an in depth, illustrated discography, see https://www.wirz.de/music/skydsc.htm

- Singer Songwriter Project (Elektra, 1965) (Sky is one of four artists, contributing three tracks, alongside David Cohen, Richard Fariña, and Bruce Murdoch)
- Patrick Sky Vanguard 79179, (1965)
- A Harvest of Gentle Clang Vanguard 79207, (1966)
- Reality Is Bad Enough Verve Forecast FTS 3052, (1968)
- Photographs Verve Forecast FTS-3079, (1969)
- Songs That Made America Famous Adelphi Records Verve Forecast FTS-3079 (1973) (also Producer)
- Two Steps Forward, One Step Back Adelphi Records AD-R4101, (1975) (also Producer)
- Through a Window, (...Topical And Folk Songs Of The Sixties) Shanachie 95003, (1985) (also Producer)

With Cathy Sky

- Down to Us Ossian, (2009)

== Legacy ==
The refrain of the title song of his third album, "Reality is bad enough, why should I tell the truth?" is included in Buckminster Fuller's 1970 book, I Seem to Be a Verb.

Joni Mitchell identified Sky as "Richard" from her song "The Last Time I Saw Richard" from her Blue album.

== See also ==
- Folk music

== General bibliography ==
- Okun, Milton (1968). Something to Sing About. New York: Macmillan.
