= Mary Hadler =

American songwriter (1902–1971)

- Born: February 28, 1902
- Origin: United States
- Died: September 27, 1971 (aged 69)
- Occupation: Songwriter

Mary Hadler (February 28, 1902 – September 27, 1971), also known as Mary Margaret Hadler and Mary Gilbert, was an American songwriter best known for writing the popular songs "Chapel by the Sea" and "Shifting Whispering Sands", in collaboration with her husband, V. C. Gilbert. Both songs were written in the 1950s, and the latter was recorded and played around the world.

Hadler was born in Minnesota where she was a nurse for 17 years. She moved to Portland, Oregon, in 1944. She and her husband began writing songs in the late 1940s. "Sands" was based on one of his personal experiences and "Chapel" was reminiscent of when the two of them lived on Sauvie Island, near Portland.
