= Luang Prabang (song) =

Vietnam War protest song by Dave Van Ronk

"Luang Prabang" is a song written by Dave Van Ronk, originally recorded by Patrick Sky for his album Songs That Made America Famous (finally released in 1973). Van Ronk recorded a version himself for Going Back To Brooklyn in 1985. It is named for the city Luang Prabang in Laos. It is one of the few songs Van Ronk wrote himself. Patrick Sky discussed at a concert how Van Ronk was supposed to appear on the album but for some reason did not. At this concert in 1973, Sky and Van Ronk performed the song together.

The song is based on the tune "Byker Hill", but with lyrics about the Vietnam War, and a refrain at the end of each verse of the song "now I'm a fuckin' hero".
