= V. C. Gilbert =

Vivan Clark Gilbert (May 28, 1901 – May 3, 1984), also known as Jack Gilbert, was an American songwriter best known for writing the popular songs "Shifting Whispering Sands" and "Chapel by the Sea", in collaboration with his wife, Mary Hadler. Both songs were written in the 1950s, and were recorded and played around the world.

He was born Vivian Clark Gilbert in Spearfish, South Dakota, moving to Portland, Oregon in 1924. He worked as a carpet layer and as a commercial fisherman on the Columbia River. He and his wife began writing songs in the late 1940s. "Sands" was based on one of his personal experiences, and "Chapel" was reminiscent of a time when the Gilberts lived on Sauvie Island, near Portland.
