= Luther Played the Boogie =

Single by Johnny Cash and the Tennessee Two
- A-side: "Luther Played the Boogie" "Thanks a Lot"
- Released: February 15, 1959
- Genre: Rockabilly
- Length: 2:02
- Label: Sun 316
- Songwriter: Johnny Cash

Johnny Cash and the Tennessee Two singles chronology
"Don't Take Your Guns to Town" (1958)	"Luther Played the Boogie" (1959)	"Frankie's Man, Johnny" / "1959"

Music video
- "Luther Played the Boogie" (audio only) on YouTube

"Luther Played the Boogie" is a song written and originally recorded by Johnny Cash. Luther is Luther Perkins, the guitarist in Cash's band.

The song was recorded on July 10, 1958 during Cash's final sessions for Sun Records. It would be released as a single (Sun 316, with "Thanks a Lot", another song from the same session, on the opposite side) on February 15 of the next year, when he already left the label for Columbia.

Before that, the song appeared on Sun Records' album Greatest! Johnny Cash, that came out in January 1959.

Cash received a BMI award for this single.

== Charts ==
Chart (1959)	Peak position
US Hot Country Songs (Billboard)	8
