= Thanks a Lot (Johnny Cash song) =

Single by Johnny Cash and the Tennessee Two
- A-side: "Thanks a Lot" "Luther Played the Boogie"
- Released: February 15, 1959
- Recorded: July 10, 1958
- Genre: Country
- Label: Sun 316
- Songwriter: Charlie Rich

Audio
- "Thanks a Lot" on YouTube

"Thanks a Lot" is a song originally recorded by Johnny Cash. It was written for him by Charlie Rich.

The song was recorded by Cash on July 10, 1958, during his final sessions for Sun Records. It was released as a single (Sun 316, with "Luther Played the Boogie", another song from the same session, on the opposite side) on February 15 of the next year, when he already had left the label for Columbia. Before that, the song appeared on Sun Records' album Greatest! Johnny Cash, that came out in January 1959. Cash received a BMI award for this single.

== Composition ==
“Thanks a Lot” was another strong Charlie Rich composition about a guy who sarcastically thanks his lover for all the pain she's putting him through. We feel the singer's hurt as he watches his lover leave him for somebody new.

— John M. Alexander. The Man in Song: A Discographic Biography of Johnny Cash

== Charts ==
Chart (1959)	Peak position
US Hot Country Songs (Billboard)	12
