= Goodbye, Little Darlin', Goodbye =

1939 song by Gene Autry and Johnny Marvin

Single by Gene Autry
- B-side: "When I'm Gone You'll Soon Forget"
- Published: March 15, 1940 by Western Music Publishing Co., Hollywood, Calif.
- Released: April 1940
- Recorded: March 12, 1940
- Studio: CBS Columbia Square, Hollywood, California
- Genre: Hillbilly, Western
- Length: 2:46
- Label: Vocalion 5463
- Songwriters: Johnny Marvin, Gene Autry
- Producer: Art Satherly

Gene Autry singles chronology
"I'm Beginning To Care" (1940)	"Goodbye, Little Darlin', Goodbye" (1940)	"El Rancho Grande" (1940)

Audio
- "Goodbye Little Darlin' Goodbye" on YouTube

"Goodbye Little Darlin'"

Single by Johnny Cash and the Tennessee Two
- A-side: "Goodby Little Darlin'" "You Tell Me"
- Released: 1959
- Genre: Country
- Label: Sun 331

Johnny Cash and the Tennessee Two singles chronology
"I Got Stripes" (1959)	"Goodbye Little Darlin'" (1959)	"Little Drummer Boy" (1959)

Audio
- "Goodby Little Darlin'" on YouTube

"Goodbye, Little Darlin', Goodbye" (also known as "Goodby Little Darlin") is a 1939 song written by Gene Autry and Johnny Marvin. Autry sang it (as a duet with Mary Lee) in the December 1939 movie South of the Border, and released it as a single in April 1940. It went on to make both Popular and Hillbilly (Country) listings for 1940.

The song would be notably recorded by Johnny Cash at Sun Records probably on December 13, 1956, and released as a single (Sun 331, with "You Tell Me" on the opposite side) in September 1959, when he had already left the label for Columbia.

== Cash version ==
According to John M. Alexander's book The Man in Song: A Discographic Biography of Johnny Cash, the song was not released as a single:

“Goodbye Little Darlin',” which was written by cowboy legend Gene Autry and songwriter Johnny Marvin, was the first Cash song Jack Clement produced. Its haunting beauty reveals a side of Cash not yet realized. His final farewell to a lover who is leaving him is truly heartbreaking. While the song was never released as a single, Cash had faith in it and would rerecord it in 1964 for his I Walk the Line album on Columbia Records. Both versions are impeccable, and either one would have made a worthy single for either label.

— John M. Alexander. The Man in Song: A Discographic Biography of Johnny Cash

== Chart performance ==
=== Gene Autry ===
Charts (1940)	Rank
US Billboard National Best Selling Retail Records	20
"The Billboard Hillbilly Record Hits of the Month" column	1
US Billboard National Best Selling Retail Records Year-End	264
"The Billboard Hillbilly Record Hits" Year-End	3

=== Johnny Cash ===
Chart (1959)	Rank	
US Hot Country Songs (Billboard)	22	22
