= You Tell Me (Johnny Cash song) =

Single by Johnny Cash and the Tennessee Two
- A-side: "You Tell Me" "Goodby Little Darlin'"
- Released: 1959
- Genre: country
- Label: Sun 331
- Songwriter: Roy Orbison

"You Tell Me" is a song originally recorded by Johnny Cash. It was written for him by Roy Orbison.

The song was recorded by Cash at Sun Records in May 1958. and released as a single (Sun 331, with "Goodby Little Darlin'" on the opposite side) in September 1959, when he already left the label for Columbia.

== Background ==
It was during this [May 1958 "The Story of Broken Heart"] session that Cash recorded “You Tell Me,” his first Roy Orbison penned ballad. Along with Elvis, Jerry Lee Lewis, and Carl Perkins, legendary singer-songwriter Roy Orbison also started his career at Sun. He enjoyed his first charting single, “Ooby Dooby,” in 1956 while working at Sun. Cash and Orbison formed a lifelong friendship, and this song by Orbison started it all. It almost feels incomplete, however, and while Cash tries to inhabit it, it does remain simply a noble attempt in his canon of songs.

— John M. Alexander. The Man in Song: A Discographic Biography of Johnny Cash
