= The Ballad of Ira Hayes =

Song by Peter La Farge

"The Ballad of Ira Hayes" is a song written by folk singer Peter La Farge. Its words tell the story of Ira Hayes, one of the six Marines who became famous for having raised the U.S. flag on Mount Suribachi during the Battle of Iwo Jima in World War II. Members of the Western Writers of America chose it as one of the Top 100 Western songs of all time.

== Content ==
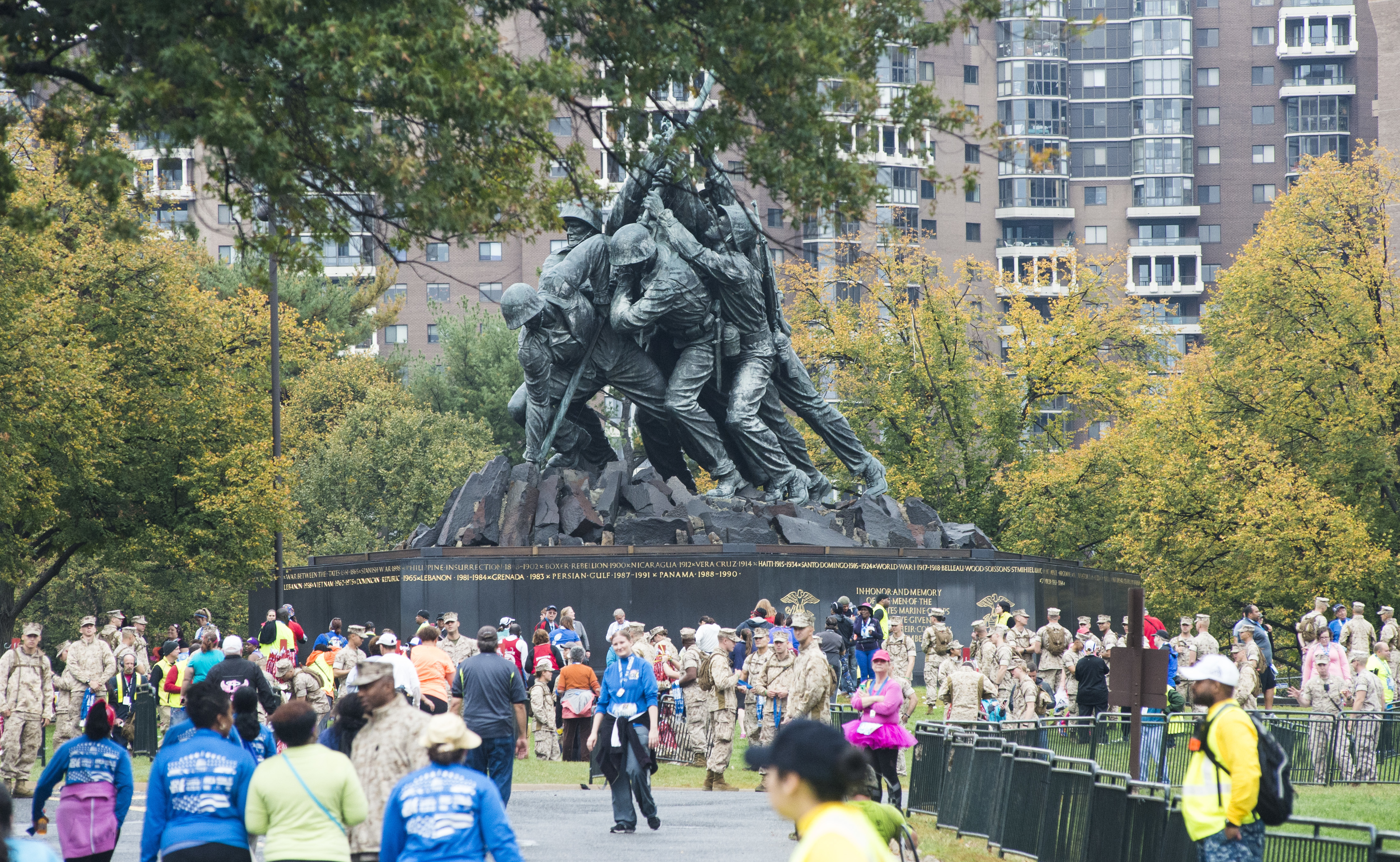
Hayes was depicted on the Iwo Jima Memorial as one of 6 men raising the U.S. flag on Iwo Jima

In the song, La Farge introduces the Pima people, who live in the Gila River Community in the Arizona desert. He then points out that the Pima people had depended on an irrigation system (using water from the Gila River) "for a thousand years," but when the U.S. started settling the area in the late 19th century, "the white men stole their water rights and the sparkling water stopped," plunging the tribe into poverty. The song then introduces Hayes, who volunteers for the U.S. Marine Corps (forgetting, in La Farge's words, "the white man's greed") and participates in the raising of the flag on Iwo Jima.

When Hayes returns home, he faces discomfort and hostility. Americans' attempts to honor Hayes are treated with contempt in La Farge's lyrics ("they let him raise the flag and lower it, like you'd throw a dog a bone."). Rejected even by people in Arizona ("back home, nobody cared what Ira'd done, and when do the Indians dance"), Ira descends into alcoholism and dies drunk in a ditch. La Farge again uses Hayes's death to call attention to the Pimas' current plight: "but his land is just as dry(!)"

== Recordings ==
"The Ballad of Ira Hayes"

Single by Johnny Cash

from the album Bitter Tears: Ballads of the American Indian
- B-side: "Bad News"
- Released: June 2, 1964
- Recorded: 1964
- Genre: Country; folk; Native American music; protest music
- Length: 4:09
- Label: Columbia
- Songwriter: Peter La Farge

Johnny Cash singles chronology
"Wide Open Road" (1964)	"The Ballad of Ira Hayes" (1964)	"Orange Blossom Special" (1965)

The song has been recorded many times. The most popular version is by Johnny Cash, which he recorded for the Bitter Tears concept album (containing mostly La Farge compositions) and reached number three on the Billboard Country Singles chart in 1964. Patrick Sky covered it on his self-titled 1965 debut album (and later for a 1985 album). Hamilton Camp included the song on his 1969 album, Welcome to Hamilton Camp.

Pete Seeger covered the song on his 1963 album Broadside Ballads Volume 2.

Townes Van Zandt covered this song at Carnegie Hall in 1969, during a rare television appearance, and at The Whole Coffeehouse, University of Minnesota Campus, November 9, 1973.

Smiley Bates covered the song on his 1971 album Songs of Life.

Bob Dylan followed suit by covering the song during his sessions for Self Portrait (released in 1970), though his version did not see release until Columbia used it as part of the Dylan album of 1973. On November 16, 1975, Dylan performed the song live at the Tuscarora Reservation, and this rendition appears on the 2019 box set The Rolling Thunder Revue: The 1975 Live Recordings and in the 2019 film Rolling Thunder Revue: A Bob Dylan Story by Martin Scorsese.

Czech country group Zelenáči (also known as Greenhorns) covered the song on their 1974 album “Písně větru z hor”. The Czech title is a direct translation of the English title, “Balada o Ira Hayesovi”.

Kinky Friedman did a cover of the song on his 1976 record Lasso from El Paso.

The song was also covered by Hazel Dickens on her 1983 bluegrass album From the Sweat of my Brow.

Kris Kristofferson sings the song on a tribute remake of Bitter Tears, released in 2014.

== See also ==
- List of anti-war songs
