= It's Just About Time =

Single by Johnny Cash and the Tennessee Two
- A-side: "It's Just About Time" "I Just Thought You'd Like to Know"
- Released: November 1958
- Genre: Country
- Label: Sun 309
- Songwriter: Jack Clement

Johnny Cash and the Tennessee Two singles chronology
| "All Over Again" (1958) | "It's Just About Time" (1958) | "Don't Take Your Guns to Town" (1958) |

Music video
- "It's Just About Time" (audio only) on YouTube

"It's Just About Time" is a song originally recorded by Johnny Cash. It was written for him by Jack Clement.

The song was recorded by Cash in July 1958 during his final sessions for Sun Records, and released as a single (Sun 309, with "I Just Thought You'd Like to Know", another song from the same sessions, on the opposite side) in November.

== Musical and lyrical content ==
"It's Just About Time" is a solid Jack Clement ballad with a honky-tonk flavor. Just about the time the singer thinks it's over for him and his careless love, he starts missing her.

— John M. Alexander. The Man in Song: A Discographic Biography of Johnny Cash

== Release and reception ==
John M. Alexander notes in his Cash biography that Sun "rush-released" "It's Just About Time" as a single to cash on the success of Cash's second single for Columbia, "Don't Take Your Guns to Town". The trick didn't quite work. While the Columbia single was surrounded by a lot of attention, "It's Just About Time" reached only No. 30 on Billboard's country chart and no. 47 on the pop one.

Peter Lowry, as well, notes (in his book I've Been Everywhere: A Johnny Cash Chronicle) that "compared to recent singles this could be seen as a flop chartwise, with a stay of just one week in the [country] charts at the start of 1959."

The flip side, "I Just Thought You'd Like to Know," reached #85 on the Billboard Hot 100 and didn't enter the country chart at all.

== Charts ==
| Chart (1958–1959) | Peak position |
|---|---|
| US Billboard Hot 100 | 47 |
| US Hot Country Songs (Billboard) | 30 |
