= I Just Thought You'd Like to Know =

Single by Johnny Cash and the Tennessee Two
- A-side: "I Just Thought You'd Like to Know" "It's Just About Time"
- Released: November 1958
- Genre: Country
- Label: Sun 309
- Songwriter: Charlie Rich

Music video
- "I Just Thought You'd Like to Know" (audio only) on YouTube

"I Just Thought You'd Like to Know" is a song originally recorded by Johnny Cash. It was written for him by Charlie Rich.

The song was recorded by Cash in July 1958 during his final sessions for Sun Records. and released as a single (Sun 309, with "It's Just About Time", another song from the same sessions, on the opposite side) in November.

== Background ==
Charlie Rich was having great success writing songs for Cash. "I Just Thought You'd Like to Know" was a fine example of how the future country star had tapped into the Cash persona and was writing songs tailor-made for his unique style. It's another honky-tonk-infused tale of a woman getting ready to leave her lover and the pain it's causing the singer. Charlie Rich would struggle to find his place in country music for the next fifteen years before hitting it big in 1973 with "Behind Closed Doors."

— John M. Alexander. The Man in Song: A Discographic Biography of Johnny Cash

"I Just Thought You'd Like to Know" only made it to number 85 on the Billboard Hot 100, with only a one-week stay there, and didn't enter the Billboard country chart, while "It's Just About Time" reached number 30 on the country chart and number 47 on the Hot 100. John M. Alexander (in his book The Man in Song: A Discographic Biography of Johnny Cash) notes that as a good result (achieved "despite all the attention surrounding" Cash's second Columbia single, "Don't Take Your Guns to Town", the Sun single was released "on the heels of"), while Peter Lowry (in his book I've Been Everywhere: A Johnny Cash Chronicle) says that "compared to [Cash's] recent singles this could be seen as a flop chartwise."

== Charts ==
Chart (1958–1959)	Peak position
US Billboard Hot 100	85
