= Green Grow the Lilacs =

Irish folk song

Green Grow the Lilacs is a folk song of Irish origin that was popular in the United States during the mid-19th century.

The song title is the source of a folk etymology for the word gringo that states that the Mexicans misheard U.S. troops singing "green grow" during the Mexican–American War.

The song appears in the 1931 stage play of the same name by Lynn Riggs, which is the basis of the 1943 musical Oklahoma!

== Versions ==
There are many different versions of the lyrics. However, one version of the lyrics opens:

Green grow the lilacs, all sparkling with dew
I'm lonely, my darling, since parting with you;
But by our next meeting I'll hope to prove true
And change the green lilacs to the Red, White and Blue.

I once had a sweetheart, but now I have none
She's gone and she's left me, I care not for one
Since she's gone and left me, contented I'll be,
For she loves another one better than me.

== Recordings ==
- 1941 Tony Kraber – included in the 78 rpm album The Old Chisholm Trail – Songs Of The American Southwest.
- 1957 Gordon MacRae – included in his album Cowboy's Lament.
- 1959 Bing Crosby and Rosemary Clooney – included in the album How the West Was Won.
- 1959 Harry Belafonte Recorded in 1958 and released in 1959 on the RCA LP "Love Is a Gentle Thing" LSP1927
- 1963 Chad Mitchell Trio
- 1965 Johnny Cash
- 1966 Tex Ritter
- 1969 Soupy Sales - released as the B-side for his single "Muck-Arty Park"
- 1976 The Blue Sky Boys (Bill And Earl Bolick)
