= Streets of Laredo (song) =

Cowboy folk song

Song
- Published: 1910
- Genre: Folk music

"Streets of Laredo" (Laws B01, Roud 23650), also known as "The Dying Cowboy", is an American cowboy ballad in which a dying ranger tells his story to another cowboy. Members of the Western Writers of America listed it as number four of the Top 100 Western songs of all time.

Derived from the traditional folk song "The Unfortunate Rake", the song has become a folk music standard, and as such has been performed, recorded and adapted numerous times, with many variations. The title refers to the city of Laredo, Texas.

The old-time cowboy Frank H. Maynard (1853–1926) of Colorado Springs, Colorado, claimed authorship of his self-published song in 1911 "The Dying Cowboy". Cowboys up and down the trail revised The Cowboy's Lament, and in his memoir, Maynard alleged that cowboys from Texas changed the title to "The Streets of Laredo" after he claimed authorship of the song in a 1924 interview with journalism professor Elmo Scott Watson, then on the faculty of the University of Illinois Urbana-Champaign.

== Lyrics ==
As I walked out on the streets of Laredo
As I walked out on Laredo one day,
I spied a poor cowboy, all wrapped in white linen
All wrapped in white linen and cold as the clay.

"I can see by your outfit, that you are a cowboy."
These words he did say as I slowly passed by.
"Come sit down beside me and hear my sad story,
For I'm shot in the chest, and today I must die."

"It was once in the saddle I used to go dashing,
Once in the saddle I used to go gay.
First down to Rosie's, and then to the card-house,
Got shot in the breast, and now here I lay."

"Oh, beat the drum slowly and play the fife lowly,
And play the death march as you carry me along;
Take me to the green valley, and lay the sod o'er me,
For I'm a young cowboy and I know I've done wrong."

"Get six jolly cowboys to carry my coffin,
Get six pretty maidens to bear up my pall.
Put bunches of roses all over my coffin,
Roses to deaden the clods as they fall."

"Then swing your rope slowly and rattle your spurs lowly,
And give a wild whoop as you carry me along;
And in the grave throw me and roll the sod o'er me.
For I'm a young cowboy and I know I've done wrong."

"Go bring me a cup, a cup of cold water.
To cool my parched lips", the cowboy then said.
Before I returned, his spirit had departed,
And gone to the round up – the cowboy was dead.

We beat the drum slowly and played the fife lowly,
And bitterly wept as we bore him along.
For we loved our comrade, so brave, young and handsome,
We all loved our comrade, although he'd done wrong.

== Origin ==
The song is widely considered to be a traditional ballad. It was first published in 1910 in John Lomax's Cowboy Songs and Other Frontier Ballads.

The lyrics appear to be primarily descended from an Irish folk song of the late 18th century called "The Unfortunate Rake", which also evolved (with a time signature change and completely different melody) into the New Orleans standard "St. James Infirmary Blues". The Irish ballad shares a melody with the British sea-song "Spanish Ladies". The Bodleian Library, Oxford, has copies of a 19th-century broadside entitled "The Unfortunate Lad", which is a version of the British ballad. Some elements of this song closely presage those in the "Streets of Laredo" and in the "St. James Infirmary Blues".

As I was a walking down by the "Lock",
As I was walking one morning of late,
Who did I spy but my own dear comrade,
Wrapp'd in flannel, so hard is his fate.

Chorus.

Had she but told me when she disordered me,
Had she but told me of it at the time,
I might have got salts and pills of white mercury,
But now I'm cut down in the height of my prime.

I boldly stepped up to him and kindly did ask him,
Why he was wrapp'd in flannel so white?
My body is injured and sadly disordered,
All by a young woman, my own heart's delight.

My father oft told me, and of[ten] times chided me,
And said my wicked ways would never do,
But I never minded him, nor ever heeded him,
[I] always kept up in my wicked ways.

Get six jolly fellows to carry my coffin,
And six pretty maidens to bear up my pall,
And give to each of them bunches of roses,
That they may not smell me as they go along.

[Over my coffin put handsful of lavender,
Handsful of lavender on every side,
Bunches of roses all over my coffin,
Saying there goes a young man cut down in his prime.]

Muffle your drums, play your pipes merrily,
Play the death [dead] march as you go along.
And fire your guns right over my coffin,
There goes an unfortunate lad to his home.

== Recorded versions ==
Recordings of the song have been made by Cisco Houston, Vernon Dalhart, Harry McClintock, Eddy Arnold, Johnny Cash, Johnny Western, Joan Baez, Burl Ives, Jim Reeves, Roy Rogers, Marty Robbins, Chet Atkins, Arlo Guthrie, The Norman Luboff Choir, Rex Allen, Willie Nelson, Waylon Jennings, Harry James and many country and western singers, as well as Bing Crosby, avant garde rocker John Cale, the British pop group Prefab Sprout, Snakefarm, Mercury Rev, Jane Siberry, Suzanne Vega, Paul Westerberg, Buck Ramsey and The Stone Coyotes.

Vince Gill recorded a version of three verses of the Irish ballad "The Bard of Armagh" (which takes the same tune) followed by three verses of this song on the album Long Journey Home, a compilation of songs about Irish emigration and the links between Irish and American folk and country music.

== In literature ==
The song plays a prominent role in the book and film Bang the Drum Slowly, in which a version of the song is sung by actor Tom Ligon in his role as Piney Woods. The words from the title replace the words "beat the drum slowly" from the lyrics below. This in turn is the phrase used in the song "Bang the Drum Slowly" on the album Red Dirt Girl by Emmylou Harris.

The lyrics are also (indirectly) the source of the title of Peter S. Beagle's 1965 travelogue of a cross-USA trip by Heinkel scooter, I See by My Outfit.

The same tune is used for the Irish lament "Bold Robert Emmet" and the sea shanty "Spanish Ladies" .

Louis MacNeice wrote a poem called "The Streets of Laredo" about the bombing of London during World War Two. The rhythms of the poem resemble the lyrics of the song, and the 1948 book Holes in the Sky states that his wife Hedli Anderson sang the poem.

The song is a featured motif in John Irving's 14th novel Avenue of Mysteries. The good gringo "el gringo bueno" sings the song incessantly, even in his sleep. The band from Circo de La Maravilla plays the song at Lupe's funeral.

White Noise by Don DeLillo features protagonist Jack Gladney’s son Heinrich "moodily" singing the song in one of the last chapters.

The lyric "For I Am a Cowboy and Know I've Done Wrong" is cited as the title of one of the songs sung "every Saturday night" on the prairie in Nebraska in the novel My Antonia by Willa Cather.

The fourth book in Larry McMurty's Lonesome Dove Chronicles shares a title with the song. The novel was originally developed as a screenplay before McMurty bought it back from the studio, finished writing the book, then later adapted it into a miniseries of the same name. The novel begins with the lyrics while the miniseries opens with the melody.

== Other versions ==
The Kingston Trio performed this comedy version as "Laredo?" on their 1961 album College Concert:

As I walked down in the streets of Laredo.
As I walked down in Laredo one day,
I spied a young cowboy dressed in white linen,
Dressed in white linen and cold as the clay.

"I can see by your outfit that you are a cowboy."
"You can see by my outfit I'm a cowboy too."
"You can see by our outfits that we are both cowboys."
"Get yourself an outfit, and be a cowboy too."

The Smothers Brothers performed a similar comedy version on their 1962 album The Two Sides of the Smothers Brothers.

Peter S. Beagle's travelogue See by My Outfit: Cross-Country by Scooter: An Adventure takes its name from this version of the song; in the book, he and his friend Phil refer to it as their "theme song".

Allan Sherman also performed a parody of the song; his version was titled "Streets of Miami", and was about vacationing Manhattan lawyers. Garrison Keillor's album Songs of the Cat has a feline-themed parody, "As I Walked Out".

Marty Robbins' 1959 album Gunfighter Ballads and Trail Songs features his hit "El Paso", similar in form and content to "Streets of Laredo". The 1960 follow-up More Gunfighter Ballads and Trail Songs has a version of the original.

Doc Watson's version, "St. James Hospital", combines some of the "cowboy" lyrics with a tune resembling "St. James Infirmary" and lyrics drawn from that song, and contains the unmistakable "bang the drum slowly" verse.

New Mexican satirist Jim Terr's parody, "Santa Fe Cowboy", "is about the kind of cowboys who wear Gucci hats and spurs by Yves St. Laurent."

A portion of "Streets of Laredo" was sung by a group of cowboys in Season 2, Episode 5: "Estralita" on the TV show Wanted Dead or Alive which first aired on 10/3/1959.

The lyrics of Pete Seeger's "Ballad of Sherman Wu" are patterned after "Streets of Laredo'" and is set to the same tune. The song presages the American Civil Rights Movement and recounts the refusal of Northwestern University's Psi Upsilon fraternity to accept Sherman Wu because of his Chinese heritage. The song deliberately echoes "Streets of Laredo", beginning:

As I was out walking the streets of Northwestern,
I spied a young freshman, dejected and blue.
And so when I asked him, "Why are you dejected?",
He said "I'm Chinese, and I can't join Psi U."

The words of the labor song "The Ballad of Bloody Thursday" – inspired by a deadly clash between strikers and police during the 1934 San Francisco longshoremen's strike – also follow the "Streets of Laredo" pattern and tune.

As for "The Cowboy's Lament/Streets of Laredo" itself, Austin E. and Alta S. Fife in Songs of the Cowboys (1966) say

There are hundreds of texts, with variants so numerous that scholars will never assemble and analyze them all.

Note that some versions of printed lyrics, such as Lomax's 1910 version, have been bowdlerized, eliminating, for example, subtle mentions of drunkenness and/or prostitution. Johnny Cash's 1965 recording substitutes "dram-house" for the traditional "Rosie's", i.e. the saloon for the brothel (though Burl Ives' 1949 recording retains the more logical, "first down to Rosie's, and then to the card-house..."). This bowdlerization renders nonsensical the next phrase, "...and then to the card-house," as though drinking and gambling took place in separate establishments. One of the Fifes' sources "exaggerating somewhat, says that there were originally seventy stanzas, sixty-nine of which had to be whistled."

An intermediately bowdlerized version of "The Cowboy's Lament":

'Twas once in my saddle I used to be happy
'Twas once in my saddle I used to be gay
But I first took to drinking, then to gambling
A shot from a six-shooter took my life away.
Beat your drums lightly, play your fifes merrily
Sing your dearth march as you bear me along
Take me to the grave yard, lay the sod o'er me
I'm a young cow-boy and know I've done wrong.

My curse let it rest, rest on the fair one
Who drove me from friends that I loved and from home
Who told me she loved me, just to deceive me
My curse rest upon her, wherever she roam.
Beat your drums lightly, play your fifes merrily
Sing your death march as you bear me along
Take me to the grave yard, lay the sod o'er me
I'm a young cow-boy and know I've done wrong.

Oh she was fair, Oh she was lovely
The belle of the Village the fairest of all
But her heart was as cold as the snow on the mountains
She gave me up for the glitter of gold.
Beat your drums lightly, play your fifes merrily
Sing your dearth march as you bear me along
Take me to the grave yard, lay the sod o'er me
I'm a young cow-boy and know I've done wrong.

I arrived in Galveston in old Texas
Drinking and gambling I went to give o'er
But, I met with a Greaser and my life he has finished
Home and relations I ne'er shall see more.
Beat your drums lightly, play your fifes merrily
Sing your dearth march as you bear me along
Take me to the grave yard, lay the sod o'er me
I'm a young cow-boy and know I've done wrong.

Send for my Father. O send for my Mother
Send for the surgeon to look at my wounds
But I fear it is useless I feel I am dying
I'm a young cow-boy cut down in my bloom.
Beat your drums lightly, play your fifes merrily
Sing your dearth march as you bear me along
Take me to the grave yard, lay the sod o'er me
I'm a young cow-boy and know I've done wrong.

Farewell my friends, farewell my relations
My earthly career has cost me sore
The cow-boy ceased talking, they knew he was dying
His trials on earth, forever were o'er.
Beat your drums lightly, play your fifes merrily
Sing your dearth march as you bear me along
Take me to the grave yard, lay the sod o'er me
I'm a young cow-boy and know I've done wrong.

– From Songs of the Cowboys, a 1908 version of "Cowboy's Lament" (typographical errors unchanged)

The third episode of the Book of Boba Fett, titled "Streets of Mos Espa", pays homage to the song. Since the release of the series, Star Wars fans have devised an unofficial version of the ballad with new lyrics.

== Derivative musical works ==
Billy Bragg has cited this ballad as the musical inspiration for his version of Woody Guthrie's "The Unwelcome Guest".

"No Man's Land" (sometimes known as "Green Fields of France"), written in 1976 by Eric Bogle, makes use of a similar melody and contains the refrain "did they beat the drums slowly, did they play the fifes lowly".

The song "Streets of the East Village" by The Dan Emery Mystery Band shows a definite influence from this song.

The song "Streets of Whitechapel" sung by J. C. Carroll is an updated version of this ballad.

The composer Samuel Barber adapted a variation on the "Streets of Laredo" tune as the principal theme in the "Allegretto" movement of Excursions, op. 20.

The tune was used for "The Homing Waltz", a song written by Johnny Reine and Tommie Connor and recorded by Vera Lynn in 1952.

Different words and a chorus were added in 1960 under the title "Only The Heartaches" by Wayne P. Walker, with additional words by Jess Edwins and Terry Kennedy. It was a minor hit in some countries for Houston Wells and the Marksmen and has been recorded by many other artists. The chorus begins "There's gold in the mountains, gold in the valleys..."

The song "Blackwatertown" by The Handsome Family is another updated version of this song, framing the narrator's downfall as the resultant of an affair with a young woman employed in the publishing industry. It was released on The Rose And The Briar, a 2004 CD compilation and companion to The Rose & the Briar: Death, Love and Liberty in the American Ballad, edited by Sean Wilentz and Greil Marcus.

The 2010 video game Fallout: New Vegas contains a song called "The Streets of New Reno", performed by JE Sawyer. The song is a Fallout universe adaptation of "The Streets of Laredo", with New Reno being an iconic location within the series.

The song "The Streets of Laredo" appears on the albums Sings the Ballads of the True West and American IV by Johnny Cash. Cash also recorded two other versions with different lyrics on his first Christmas album (1963), and then again as "The Walls of a Prison" on his From Sea to Shining Sea album in 1967.

"When I Was a Young Girl", a female version of the same theme, was popular on the folk music circuits in the late 1950s and early 1960s, and was recorded by Barbara Dane and Odetta before being revived by Nina Simone, Leslie Feist, and Marlon Williams.

In 1995, Judy Collins used the tune of "Streets of Laredo" for the song "Bard of my Heart", about her late son Clark, on her album, Shameless.

The tune and lyrics of "Streets of Laredo" were used in the 1973 film Bang the Drum Slowly, a sports drama based on Mark Harris's novel of the same name.

"Streets of Laredo" is used as the theme music at the beginning of the Coen Brothers’ The Ballad of Buster Scruggs (2018); in its last segment, Brendan Gleeson sings "The Unfortunate Rake".

The tune of “Streets of Laredo” is used as the tune for “The Ballad of Lucy Gray Baird” in the 2023 film The Hunger Games: The Ballad of Songbirds and Snakes, based on Suzanne Collins’s novel The Ballad of Songbirds and Snakes (2020).

The Relevant Hairstyles song “Laredo Pickup” (2024) uses part of the same tune, and reimagines the meeting as a cruising encounter between two cowboys.

== Television and cinema ==
The song is also featured in the following films:

- Pursued (1947) directed by Raoul Walsh, played on piano at the Honest Wheel and later sung by Robert Mitchum.
- 3 Godfathers (1948) directed by John Ford, sung by Harry Carey Jr.
- The Plunderers (1948) - the song was played from a saloon piano as the main characters spoke with each other out in the street.
- Bang the Drum Slowly (1973) - Several verses of this song are sung in the locker room by catcher Piney Woods, played by Tom Ligon.
- Night on Earth (1991) - A line from the song is sung by Roberto Benigni's character.
- Brokeback Mountain (2005).
- Appaloosa (2008) - sung by Kate Jewell.
- The Borderlands (2013) - Lines from the song also feature in this British found-footage horror film.
- The Ballad of Buster Scruggs (2018) - A few verses from the traditional Irish ballad "The Unfortunate Rake" are sung by the Irishman, played by Brendan Gleeson.
- Rocketman (2019) - Elton John and Bernie Taupin sing the song together in a café which plays a part with starting their friendship and writing partnership.
- Asteroid City (2023) - the song can be heard twice in the movie, once as "The Cowboy’s Lament" by Burt Ives and a second time as "The Streets of Laredo" by Bing Crosby.

In TV:

- Maverick - sung by the character Bret Maverick (James Garner) in the episode "The Belcastle Brand" (1958).
- Rawhide - Season 5 in the episode "Pale Rider" sung by each of twin brothers (1964).
- Gunsmoke - sung by the character Martin Kellum (Theodore Bikel) in the episode 'Song for Dying' (1965).
- Murder, She Wrote - Two verses of this song are sung by a character during a wake in the "Snow White, Blood Red" episode (1988).
- Deadwood - sung by the character Al Swearengen (Ian McShane) in one episode.
- In "Per Stirpes" (Season 3, Episode 4; 28 February 2021) of the Australian forensic crime show Harrow, three regular characters, Bryan Nichols (Damien Garvey), Lyle Fairley (Darren Gilshenan), and Daniel Harrow (Ioan Gruffudd), sing part of the song before being interrupted by a man who represents himself as a ghost shot to death, like the cowboy in the song.
- Boston Legal - sung by Melvin Palmer (Christopher Rich) by the campfire in season five, episode six: 'Happy Trails' (2008).
