= Shifting Whispering Sands =

Single by Billy Vaughn and His Orchestra
- B-side: "The Shifting Whispering Sands, Part 2"
- Written: 1950
- Released: July 1955
- Genre: Western
- Length: 5:52
- Label: Dot
- Composer: Mary Hadler
- Lyricist: V. C. Gilbert
- Producer: Randy Wood

"Shifting Whispering Sands" is a Western song and poem written by Vivian Clark Gilbert and his wife Mary Margaret Hadler. It has been widely recorded, and was one of the top songs in the U.S. in 1955 and again in 1962. Members of the Western Writers of America chose it as one of the Top 100 Western songs of all time.

== Background ==
The song/poem begins with a narration by an unnamed man who is prospecting for gold in the Western U.S. He wanders into the deserted "valley of the shifting, whispering sands", and describes its desolate, frightening environment. After wandering there for "days and weeks" and using all his food and water, he escapes in some unknown way. He "pays his final debt" for being spared by telling what he learned out in the desert. The narration ends, followed by a song that reprises his experience. The entire work takes almost six minutes to recite and sing. Some recorded releases omit the narration entirely, while others incorporate it and the song in various sequences.

== Recordings ==
The song was written in 1950 and recorded in 1955. It charted twice, by Rusty Draper and also by Billy Vaughn and His Orchestra, and both became hit recordings. Vaughn's version utilized the spoken word of Ken Nordine, whose voice was often used in voice-overs and on some recordings. There was even a parody version, "The Shifting Whimpering Sands", recorded by Homer and Jethro.

The song was released again by Billy Vaughn on an album of that name in 1962, with the voices of the Ray Conniff Singers and again with narration by Ken Nordine. Over the years it has been recorded by many artists, including Johnny Cash, Jim Reeves, Walter Brennan, Lorne Greene, and Eamonn Andrews.
