= Peter La Farge =

American singer-songwriter (1931–1965)

- Born: Oliver Albee La Farge; April 30, 1931
- Origin: United States
- Died: October 27, 1965 (aged 34)
- Genre: Folk music
- Instruments: Vocals, guitar
- Years active: 1962–1965
- Labels: Folkways, MGM
- Partner: Inger Nielsen

Peter La Farge (born Oliver Albee La Farge; April 30, 1931 – October 27, 1965) was an American singer–songwriter. He became known for his folk songs and performed most frequently in Greenwich Village in the 1950s and 1960s.

== Early life and education ==
He was born Oliver Albee La Farge in 1931 to Oliver La Farge, a Pulitzer Prize-winning novelist and anthropologist, and Wanden (née Matthews) La Farge, a Rhode Island heiress. The family moved to Santa Fe, New Mexico, where his younger sister Povy was born in 1933. His parents divorced in 1937.

La Farge grew up partly in New Mexico with his father and stepmother Consuelo Otile Baca and their son, his half-brother. His mother also remarried, to Andy Kane, a rancher. The boy lived with them part of the time on the Kane Ranch in Colorado, although he did not get along well with his stepfather.

He shared a love and respect with his father for the histories and cultures of Native Americans, which his father was deeply studying. La Farge later became estranged from his father, and changed his given name to Peter. At times he would even claim, falsely, that he was adopted.

Peter went to Fountain-Fort Carson High School but left before graduating. Around this time, he appeared in local theatrical amateur nights, and in 1946/47 he sang cowboy songs on Colorado Springs radio stations KVOR and KRDO.

Throughout his childhood, Peter went to rodeos with his stepfather Andy Kane (who took part in roping events). As a teenager, La Farge began to compete as a rodeo rider in both bareback and saddle bronc events.

== Korean War and early career ==
La Farge joined the United States Navy in 1950 and served in the aircraft carrier USS Boxer throughout the Korean War. He also joined the Central Intelligence Division (CID) as an undercover agent involved in efforts to suppress narcotics smuggling. While in the Navy, he learned to box and took part in a few dozen prize fights. His nose was broken twice. His ship was once hit by a plane that missed its landing, and he suffered burns in the ensuing fire. He was discharged in 1953 and awarded the China Service Medal, a U.N. Service Medal and Ribbon, and a Korean Service Medal and Ribbon (5 stars).

After the war, La Farge competed again as a rodeo cowboy, getting injured often and almost losing a leg in one accident with a Brahma bull. Following his recuperation, he studied acting at the Goodman Theater drama school in Chicago and took supporting roles in local plays, remaining in the city for two years. During this period, he married a fellow actor, Suzanne Becker.

== New York years and later career ==
La Farge relocated to New York City, where he became interested in music. As a young musician, he worked with Big Bill Broonzy, Josh White, and Cisco Houston; Houston became La Farge's mentor in songwriting and in life. As a singer-songwriter, Peter La Farge became well known as a folk music singer in Greenwich Village. He was contracted briefly with Columbia Records.

At a September 1962 Carnegie Hall "hootenanny" hosted by Pete Seeger to introduce new talent, Bob Dylan performed a song that he never recorded, La Farge's "As Long as the Grass Shall Grow".

La Farge's performances in Greenwich Village gained him a recording contract with Moses Asch, founder of Folkways Records. La Farge's five Folkways albums (1962–1965) were dedicated to Native American themes, as well as blues, cowboy songs, and love songs. "The Ballad of Ira Hayes," his most famous song, is the story of Ira Hayes, a Pima Indian who became a hero as one of six United States Marines who raised the U.S. flag on Iwo Jima and were captured in a photograph that gained wide renown. After return to civilian life, Hayes suffered from prejudice and struggled with alcoholism.

The song was covered by Johnny Cash on his 1964 album Bitter Tears: Ballads of the American Indian, reaching Number 2 on the Billboard country music chart. Cash, who at one point believed La Farge to be Native American, credited him with inspiring the entire album, which included four La Farge songs in addition to "The Ballad of Ira Hayes."

By 1965, La Farge was also becoming known as an artist and painter. He lived with the Danish singer Inger Nielsen, and the pair had a daughter, Karen. They did not marry, in part because La Farge was still married to Suzanne. After a breakdown, she had been confined to a mental institution in Michigan.

La Farge was signed to MGM Records, where he planned a new album. However, in October 1965, Peter La Farge was found dead in his New York City apartment by Inger Nielsen.

He was said to have died from a stroke. There was speculation that he died of an overdose of Thorazine, an antipsychotic drug that Johnny Cash, who struggled with addiction, had allegedly introduced to La Farge as a sleep aid. La Farge was buried in Fountain, Colorado.

A posthumous tribute album, Rare Breed, was recorded in 2010.

== Selected discography ==
- 1962: Ira Hayes and Other Ballads
- 1962: Iron Mountain and Other Songs
- 1963: As Long as the Grass Shall Grow: Peter La Farge Sings of the Indians
- 1963: Peter La Farge Sings of the Cowboys: Cowboy, Ranch and Rodeo Songs, and Cattle Calls
- 1964: Peter La Farge Sings Women Blues: Peter La Farge Sings Love Songs
- 1965: Peter LaFarge on the Warpath
- 2010: Rare Breed: The Songs of Peter La Farge

== Sources ==
- Cash, Johnny. Cash: The Autobiography of Johnny Cash. Harper, 2000. ISBN 978-0-00-274080-7
- Schulman, Sandra Hale. The Ballad of Peter LaFarge, a 2010 documentary. UPC 8-85444-39205-4
- Sounes, Howard. Down the Highway: The Life of Bob Dylan. Doubleday, 2001. ISBN 0-552-99929-6
