= The Man in Black 1959–1962 =

Box set by Johnny Cash
- Released: 1991
- Recorded: 1959–1962
- Genres: Rockabilly; country
- Length: Seven hours
- Label: Bear Family Records BCD 15562 EH

Johnny Cash chronology
Come Along and Ride this Train (1991)	The Man in Black 1959–1962 (1991)	The Mystery of Life (1991)

Professional ratings
Review scores
Source	Rating
Allmusic	link
The Rolling Stone Album Guide	5/5 stars

The Man in Black 1959–1962 is the third box set released by Bear Family Records. It contains 5 CDs of Johnny Cash's music. The first four discs include many well-known and rare songs, as well as some outtakes. Disc 5 consists of outtakes of seven songs.

== Track listing ==
Disc One
No.	Title	Original album	Length
1.	"Snow in His Hair"	Hymns by Johnny Cash
2.	"I Saw a Man"	Hymns by Johnny Cash
3.	"Lead Me Gently Home"	Hymns by Johnny Cash
4.	"Are All the Children In"	Hymns by Johnny Cash
5.	"Swing Low, Sweet Chariot"	Hymns by Johnny Cash
6.	"I Call Him"	Hymns by Johnny Cash
7.	"Old Account"	Hymns by Johnny Cash
8.	"He'll Be a Friend"	Hymns by Johnny Cash
9.	"These Things Shall Pass"	Hymns by Johnny Cash
10.	"It Could Be You (Instead of Him)"	Songs of Our Soil
11.	"God Will"	Hymns by Johnny Cash
12.	"Great Speckled Bird"	Songs of Our Soil
13.	"Were You There (When They Crucified My Lord)?"	Single A-side
14.	"He'll Understand and Say Well Done"	Hymns from the Heart
15.	"God Must Have My Fortune Laid Away"	Hymns from the Heart
16.	"When I've Learned Enough to Die"	Hymns from the Heart
17.	"I Got Shoes"	Hymns from the Heart
18.	"Let the Lower Lights Be Burning"	Hymns from the Heart
19.	"If We Never Meet Again"	Hymns from the Heart
20.	"When I Take My Vacation in Heaven"	Hymns from the Heart
21.	"When He Reached Down His Hand for Me"	Hymns from the Heart
22.	"Taller than Trees"	Hymns from the Heart
23.	"I Won't Have to Cross Jordan Alone"	Hymns from the Heart
24.	"My God is Real"	Hymns from the Heart
25.	"These Hands"	Hymns from the Heart
26.	"Were You There (When They Crucified My Lord)?"	Previously unreleased
27.	"(There'll Be) Peace in the Valley"	"Were You There (When They Crucified My Lord)?" B-side
28.	"A Day in the Grand Canyon"	The Lure of the Grand Canyon

Disc Two
No.	Title	Original album	Length
1.	"I'll Remember You"	"The Little Drummer Boy" B-side
2.	"I Got Stripes"	Single A-side
3.	"You Dreamer You"	"Frankie's Man Johnny" B-side
4.	"Five Feet High and Rising"	Songs of Our Soil
5.	"The Rebel – Johnny Yuma"	"The Rebel – Johnny Yuma" EP
6.	"Lorena"	"The Rebel - Johnny Yuma" EP
7.	"Second Honeymoon"	Single A-side
8.	"Fable of Willie Brown"	The Unissued Johnny Cash
9.	"Smiling Bill McCall"	"Seasons of My Heart" B-side
10.	"Johnny Yuma Theme"
11.	"Man on the Hill"	Songs of Our Soil
12.	"Hank and Joe and Me"	Songs of Our Soil
13.	"Caretaker"	Songs of Our Soil
14.	"Clementine"	Songs of Our Soil
15.	"I Want to Go Home"	Songs of Our Soil
16.	"Old Apache Squaw"	Songs of Our Soil
17.	"Don't Step on Mother's Roses"	Songs of Our Soil
18.	"My Grandfather's Clock"	Songs of Our Soil
19.	"I Couldn't Keep from Crying"	Now, There Was a Song!
20.	"My Shoes Keep Walking Back to You"	Now, There Was a Song!
21.	"I Will Miss You When You Go"	Now, There Was a Song!
22.	"I Feel Better All Over"	Now, There Was a Song!
23.	"Bandana" (The Tennessee Two & Friend)	Single A-side
24.	"Wabash Blues" (The Tennessee Two & Friend)	"Bandana" B-side
25.	"Viel zu spät (I Got Stripes)"	The Unissued Johnny Cash
26.	"Wo ist zu Hause, Mama (Five Feet High and Rising)"	The Unissued Johnny Cash
27.	"Heartbeat" (vocal: Roy Rivers)	Previously unreleased
28.	"Hello Again" (vocal: Roy Rivers)	Previously unreleased

Disc Three
No.	Title	Original album	Length
1.	"Tall Man"	"Tennessee Flat Top Box" B-side
2.	"Girl in Saskatoon"	"Locomotive Man" B-side
3.	"Locomotive Man"	Single A-side
4.	"The Losing Kind"	Previously unreleased
5.	"Five Minutes to Live"	Previously unreleased
6.	"Forty Shades of Green"	"The Rebel – Johnny Yuma" B-side
7.	"The Big Battle"	Single A-side
8.	"Blues for Two" (The Tennessee Two & Friend)	Single A-side
9.	"Jeri and Nina's Melody" (The Tennessee Two & Friend)	"Blues for Two" B-side
10.	"Why Do You Punish Me (For Loving You)"	Now, There Was a Song!
11.	"Just One More"	Now, There Was a Song!
12.	"Seasons of My Heart"	Now, There Was a Song!
13.	"Honky Tonk Girl"	Now, There Was a Song!
14.	"I'm So Lonesome I Could Cry"	Now, There Was a Song!
15.	"Time Changes Everything"	Now, There Was a Song!
16.	"I'd Just Be Fool Enough (To Fall)"	Now, There Was a Song!
17.	"Transfusion Blues"	Now, There Was a Song!
18.	"Lovin' Locomotive Man"	Previously unreleased
19.	"Five Minutes to Live"	Previously unreleased
20.	"Mr. Lonesome"	The Sound of Johnny Cash
21.	"Forty Shades of Green"	Previously unreleased
22.	"Folsom Prison Blues"	Previously unreleased
23.	"I Walk the Line"	Previously unreleased
24.	"Hey Porter"	Previously unreleased
25.	"I Forgot More Than You'll Ever Know"	Previously unreleased
26.	"There's a Mother Always Waiting"	Previously unreleased
27.	"The Losing Kind"	The Unissued Johnny Cash

Disc Four
No.	Title	Original album	Length
1.	"Tennessee Flat Top Box"	Single A-side
2.	"Sing It Pretty, Sue"	The Sound of Johnny Cash
3.	"Little at a Time"	"In the Jailhouse Now" B-side
4.	"So Do I"	The Unissued Johnny Cash
5.	"Bonanza"	Single A-side
6.	"Shamrock Doesn't Grow in California"	The Unissued Johnny Cash
7.	"I'm Free from the Chain Gang Now"	The Sound of Johnny Cash
8.	"Delia's Gone"	Previously unreleased
9.	"Lost on the Desert"	The Sound of Johnny Cash
10.	"I Forgot More Than You'll Ever Know"	The Sound of Johnny Cash
11.	"Accidentally on Purpose"	The Sound of Johnny Cash
12.	"You Remembered Me"	The Sound of Johnny Cash
13.	"In the Jailhouse Now"	The Sound of Johnny Cash
14.	"Let Me Down Easy"	The Sound of Johnny Cash
15.	"In Them Cottonfields Back Home"	The Sound of Johnny Cash
16.	"You Won't Have Far to Go"	The Sound of Johnny Cash
17.	"Delia's Gone"	The Sound of Johnny Cash
18.	"No One Will Ever Know"	Happiness Is You
19.	"Danger Zone"	The Unissued Johnny Cash
20.	"I'll Be All Smiles Tonight"	Previously unreleased
21.	"Send a Picture of Mother"	"Busted" B-side
22.	"Hardin Wouldn't Run"	Previously unreleased
23.	"Sing It Pretty, Sue"	Previously unreleased
24.	"Blue Bandana" (The Tennessee Two & Friend)	Previously unreleased
25.	"So Doggone Lonesome" (The Tennessee Two & Friend)	Previously unreleased
26.	"Johnny Reb"	Previously unreleased
27.	"Delia's Gone"	Previously unreleased
28.	"I Walk The Line" (take 6, slow)	Previously unreleased
29.	"I Walk the Line" (take 9, fast)	Previously unreleased

Disc Five
No.	Title	Original album	Length
1.	"Girl in Saskatoon"	Previously unreleased
2.	"Girl in Saskatoon"	Previously unreleased
3.	"Girl in Saskatoon"	Previously unreleased
4.	"Girl in Saskatoon"	Previously unreleased
5.	"Girl in Saskatoon"	Previously unreleased
6.	"Girl in Saskatoon"	Previously unreleased
7.	"Girl in Saskatoon"	Previously unreleased
8.	"Empty Chair" (vocal: Roy Cash)	Previously unreleased
9.	"Empty Chair" (vocal: Roy Cash)	Previously unreleased
10.	"Empty Chair" (vocal: Roy Cash)	Previously unreleased
11.	"Relief Is Just a Swallow Away" (vocal: Roy Cash)	Previously unreleased
12.	"Relief Is Just a Swallow Away" (vocal: Roy Cash)	Previously unreleased
13.	"Relief Is Just a Swallow Away" (vocal: Roy Cash)	Previously unreleased
14.	"Relief Is Just a Swallow Away" (vocal: Roy Cash)	Previously unreleased
15.	"Relief Is Just a Swallow Away" (vocal: Roy Cash)	Previously unreleased
16.	"Riot in Cell Block #9" (vocal: Ray Liberto, Jr.)	Previously unreleased
17.	"Riot in Cell Block #9" (vocal: Ray Liberto, Jr.)	Previously unreleased
18.	"Riot in Cell Block #9" (vocal: Ray Liberto, Jr.)	Previously unreleased
19.	"It's a Sin to Tell a Lie" (vocal: Ray Liberto, Jr.)	Previously unreleased
20.	"Rocket 69" (vocal: Ray Liberto, Jr.)	Previously unreleased
21.	"Rocket 69" (vocal: Ray Liberto, Jr.)	Previously unreleased
22.	"Blueberry Hill" (vocal: Ray Liberto, Jr.)	Previously unreleased

== Credits ==
- Mastered by – Duncan Cowell
- Producer – Don Law, Jack Clement
- Reissue producer – Colin Escott, Richard Weize
