= The Man in Black 1963–1969 =

Box set by Johnny Cash
- Released: March 1994
- Recorded: 1963–1969
- Genre: Rockabilly; country
- Label: Bear Family BCD 15588

Johnny Cash chronology
| American Recordings (1994) | The Man in Black 1963–1969 (1994) | The Road Goes on Forever (1995) |

Professional ratings
Review scores
| Source | Rating |
|---|---|
| Allmusic | 4.5/5 stars |
| The Rolling Stone Album Guide | 5/5 stars |

The Man in Black 1963–1969 is the 82nd overall album by Johnny Cash. It was released in March 1994 by Bear Family Records and is the fourth box set, containing 6 CDs of Cash's music. The album peaked at number 37 in Australia.

== Track listing ==
Disc One
| No. | Title | Original Album | Length |
|---|---|---|---|
| 1. | "Ring of Fire" | Single A-side | 2:39 |
| 2. | "The Matador" | Single A-side | 2:48 |
| 3. | "I'd Still Be There" | "Ring of Fire" B-side | 2:35 |
| 4. | "Still in Town" | I Walk the Line | 2:39 |
| 5. | "El Matador" (Spanish) | Previously unreleased | 2:47 |
| 6. | "Fuego d'Amor (Anillo de Fuego)" (Spanish) | Previously unreleased | 2:37 |
| 7. | "My Old Faded Rose" | Previously unreleased | 2:54 |
| 8. | "It Ain't Me Babe" | Orange Blossom Special | 3:06 |
| 9. | "Don't Think Twice, It's All Right" | Orange Blossom Special | 2:58 |
| 10. | "One Too Many Mornings" | Johnny & June | 2:39 |
| 11. | "Mama, You've Been on My Mind" | Orange Blossom Special | 3:04 |
| 12. | "The Long Black Veil" | Orange Blossom Special | 3:09 |
| 13. | "The Wall" | Orange Blossom Special | 2:14 |
| 14. | "Orange Blossom Special" | Orange Blossom Special | 3:10 |
| 15. | "Troublesome Waters" | I Walk the Line | 3:52 |
| 16. | "I Walk the Line" | I Walk the Line | 2:36 |
| 17. | "Folsom Prison Blues" | I Walk the Line | 2:35 |
| 18. | "Wreck of the Old '97" | I Walk the Line | 2:48 |
| 19. | "Hey Porter" | I Walk the Line | 2:22 |
| 20. | "Big River" | I Walk the Line | 2:21 |
| 21. | "All of God's Children Ain't Free" | Orange Blossom Special | 2:15 |
| 22. | "Amen" | Orange Blossom Special | 2:08 |
| 23. | "When It's Springtime in Alaska (It's Forty Below)" | Orange Blossom Special | 2:39 |
| 24. | "You Wild Colorado" | Orange Blossom Special | 1:47 |
| 25. | "Danny Boy" | Orange Blossom Special | 4:12 |
| 26. | "I Still Miss Someone" | I Walk the Line | 3:10 |
| 27. | "Give My Love to Rose" | I Walk the Line | 2:24 |
| 28. | "Goodbye Little Darlin'" | I Walk the Line | 2:26 |

Disc Two
| No. | Title | Original Album | Length |
|---|---|---|---|
| 1. | "Dark as a Dungeon" | "Understand Your Man" B-side | 2:30 |
| 2. | "Bottom of the Mountain" | "Boa Constrictor" B-side | 2:29 |
| 3. | "Understand Your Man" | I Walk the Line | 2:44 |
| 4. | "Time and Time Again" | "It Ain't Me Babe" B-side | 2:12 |
| 5. | "I Still Miss Someone" | Previously unreleased | 2:35 |
| 6. | "Hardin Wouldn't Run" | Previously unreleased | 3:52 |
| 7. | "Mama, You've Been on My Mind" | Previously unreleased | 2:55 |
| 8. | "A Certain Kinda Hurtin'" | "The Sons of Katie Elder" B-side | 2:02 |
| 9. | "My Old Faded Rose" | Tall Man | 2:46 |
| 10. | "How Did You Get Away from Me" (with June Carter) | Johnny & June | 2:02 |
| 11. | "Bad News" | I Walk the Line | 2:57 |
| 12. | "A Cup of Coffee" | Everybody Loves a Nut | 4:45 |
| 13. | "Dirty Old Egg Sucking Hound" | Previously unreleased | 2:26 |
| 14. | "The One on the Right Is on the Left" | Everybody Loves a Nut | 2:50 |
| 15. | "Concerning Your New Song" | Previously unreleased | 3:30 |
| 16. | "The Bug That Tried to Crawl Around the World" | Everybody Loves a Nut | 2:57 |
| 17. | "Flushed from the Bathroom of Your Heart" | Previously unreleased | 2:04 |
| 18. | "Dirty Old Egg Sucking Dog" | Everybody Loves a Nut | 2:09 |
| 19. | "Take Me Home" | Everybody Loves a Nut | 2:42 |
| 20. | "The Song of the Coward" | Previously unreleased | 3:36 |
| 21. | "Please Don't Play Red River Valley" | Everybody Loves a Nut | 2:56 |
| 22. | "Foolish Questions" | Tall Man | 3:11 |
| 23. | "The Singing Star's Queen" | Everybody Loves a Nut | 3:00 |
| 24. | "Austin Prison" | Everybody Loves a Nut | 2:10 |
| 25. | "Boa Constrictor" | Everybody Loves a Nut | 1:47 |
| 26. | "Everybody Loves a Nut" | Everybody Loves a Nut | 2:07 |
| 27. | "The Sound of Laughter" | Tall Man | 2:40 |
| 28. | "Joe Bean" | Everybody Loves a Nut | 3:07 |

Disc Three
| No. | Title | Original Album | Length |
|---|---|---|---|
| 1. | "The Frozen Logger" | Country & Western Classics | 2:23 |
| 2. | "The Baby Is Mine" | Johnny & June | 2:33 |
| 3. | "Happy to Be with You" | Happiness Is You | 3:14 |
| 4. | "For Lovin' Me" | Happiness Is You | 2:40 |
| 5. | "Wabash Cannonball" | Happiness Is You | 2:41 |
| 6. | "Guess Things Happen That Way" | Happiness Is You | 1:55 |
| 7. | "Happiness Is You" | Happiness Is You | 2:59 |
| 8. | "Ancient History" | Happiness Is You | 2:23 |
| 9. | "You Comb Her Hair" | Happiness Is You | 2:42 |
| 10. | "A Wound Time Can't Erase" | Happiness Is You | 2:37 |
| 11. | "Is This My Destiny" | Happiness Is You | 2:31 |
| 12. | "Jackson" | Carryin' On with Johnny Cash and June Carter | 2:48 |
| 13. | "Pack Up Your Sorrows" | Carryin' On with Johnny Cash and June Carter | 2:29 |
| 14. | "Long Legged Guitar Pickin' Man" | Carryin' On with Johnny Cash and June Carter | 2:35 |
| 15. | "Fast Boat to Sydney" | Carryin' On with Johnny Cash and June Carter | 2:31 |
| 16. | "You'll Be All Right" | Carryin' On with Johnny Cash and June Carter | 1:49 |
| 17. | "I Got a Woman" | Carryin' On with Johnny Cash and June Carter | 3:18 |
| 18. | "What'd I Say" | Previously unreleased | 2:44 |
| 19. | "Oh, What a Good Thing We Had" | Carryin' On with Johnny Cash and June Carter | 2:46 |
| 20. | "No, No, No" | Carryin' On with Johnny Cash and June Carter | 1:52 |
| 21. | "Shantytown" | Carryin' On with Johnny Cash and June Carter | 2:22 |
| 22. | "What'd I Say" | Carryin' On with Johnny Cash and June Carter | 2:51 |
| 23. | "Still in Town" | Previously unreleased | 2:36 |
| 24. | "The Matador" (Original) | Previously unreleased | 2:47 |
| 25. | "Wer kennt den Weg (I Walk the Line)" (Without Vocal Chorus) | Previously unreleased | 2:35 |
| 26. | "In Virginia" (Without Vocal Chorus) | Previously unreleased | 2:11 |
| 27. | "Kleine Rosmarie" (Without Vocal Chorus) | Previously unreleased | 1:56 |
| 28. | "Besser so, Jenny-Jo" (Without Vocal Chorus) | Previously unreleased | 2:27 |
| 29. | "Wer Kennt Den Weg (I Walk the Line)" | German single | 2:03 |
| 30. | "In Virginia" | German single | 2:06 |
| 31. | "Kleine Rosmarie" | German single | 1:56 |
| 32. | "Besser so, Jenny-Jo" | German single | 2:11 |

Disc Four
| No. | Title | Original Album | Length |
|---|---|---|---|
| 1. | "Thunderball" | Johnny & June | 2:53 |
| 2. | "The Sons of Katie Elder" | Single A-side | 2:34 |
| 3. | "Put the Sugar to Bed" | "You Beat All I Ever Saw" B-side | 2:24 |
| 4. | "Red Velvet" | "The Wind Changes" B-side | 2:47 |
| 5. | "Rosanna's Going Wild" | Single A-side | 2:00 |
| 6. | "The Wind Changes" | Single A-side | 2:48 |
| 7. | "On the Line" | Tall Man | 2:22 |
| 8. | "Roll Call" | "Rosanna's Going Wild" B-side | 2:27 |
| 9. | "You Beat All I Ever Saw" | Single A-side | 2:10 |
| 10. | "I Tremble for You" | Tall Man | 2:15 |
| 11. | "Cattle Call" (The Tennessee Three) | Single A-side | 2:07 |
| 12. | "Bill's Theme" (The Tennessee Three) | "Cattle Call" B-side | 2:11 |
| 13. | "Outside Looking In" (The Tennessee Three) | Single A-side | 2:33 |
| 14. | "Spanish Harlem" (The Tennessee Three) | "Outside Looking In" B-side | 2:41 |
| 15. | "The Folk Singer" | "Folsom Prison Blues (live)" B-side | 3:05 |
| 16. | "Southwind" | Hello, I'm Johnny Cash | 3:15 |
| 17. | "The Devil to Pay" | Hello, I'm Johnny Cash | 3:28 |
| 18. | "'Cause I Love You" | Hello, I'm Johnny Cash | 2:34 |
| 19. | "See Ruby Fall" | Hello, I'm Johnny Cash | 2:51 |
| 20. | "Route No. 1, Box 144" | Hello, I'm Johnny Cash | 2:28 |
| 21. | "Sing a Traveling Song" | Hello, I'm Johnny Cash | 3:08 |
| 22. | "If I Were a Carpenter" | Hello, I'm Johnny Cash | 3:01 |
| 23. | "To Beat the Devil" | Hello, I'm Johnny Cash | 4:24 |
| 24. | "Blistered" | Hello, I'm Johnny Cash | 2:24 |
| 25. | "Wrinkled Crinkled Wadded Dollar Bill" | Hello, I'm Johnny Cash | 2:32 |
| 26. | "I've Got a Thing About Trains" | Hello, I'm Johnny Cash | 2:50 |
| 27. | "Six White Horses" | Previously unreleased | 2:45 |
| 28. | "Jesus Was a Carpenter" | Hello, I'm Johnny Cash | 3:57 |
| 29. | "Man in Black" | Man in Black | 2:52 |

Disc Five
| No. | Title | Original Album | Length |
|---|---|---|---|
| 1. | "The Christmas Spirit" | The Christmas Spirit | 5:02 |
| 2. | "I Heard the Bells on Christmas Day" | The Christmas Spirit | 2:31 |
| 3. | "Blue Christmas" | The Christmas Spirit | 2:23 |
| 4. | "The Gifts They Gave" | The Christmas Spirit | 3:32 |
| 5. | "Here Was a Man" | The Christmas Spirit | 2:43 |
| 6. | "Christmas as I Knew It" | The Christmas Spirit | 3:40 |
| 7. | "Silent Night" | The Christmas Spirit | 3:29 |
| 8. | "The Little Drummer Boy" | The Christmas Spirit | 2:37 |
| 9. | "It Came Upon a Midnight Clear" | Previously unreleased | 3:00 |
| 10. | "Ringing the Bells for Jim" | The Christmas Spirit | 2:46 |
| 11. | "We Are the Shepherds" | The Christmas Spirit | 3:13 |
| 12. | "Who Kept the Sheep" | The Christmas Spirit | 1:56 |
| 13. | "The Ballad of the Harp Weaver" | The Christmas Spirit | 4:23 |
| 14. | "Wildwood Flower" | Orange Blossom Special | 2:13 |
| 15. | "Engine 143" | Tall Man | 3:33 |
| 16. | "Keep on the Sunny Side" | Keep on the Sunny Side | 2:28 |
| 17. | "Single Girl, Married Girl" | Previously unreleased | 2:20 |
| 18. | "The Banks of the Ohio" | Keep on the Sunny Side | 4:04 |
| 19. | "My Clinch Mountain Home" | Keep on the Sunny Side | 2:55 |
| 20. | "Lonesome Valley" | Keep on the Sunny Side | 2:04 |
| 21. | "Worried Man Blues" | Keep on the Sunny Side | 2:39 |
| 22. | "Wabash Cannonball" | Keep on the Sunny Side | 2:31 |
| 23. | "Brown Hearted Lover" | Keep on the Sunny Side | 2:23 |
| 24. | "Brown Eyes" | Keep on the Sunny Side | 3:25 |
| 25. | "I'm Working on a Building" | Keep on the Sunny Side | 2:40 |
| 26. | "Gathering Flowers from the Hillside" | Keep on the Sunny Side | 2:35 |
| 27. | "When the Roses Bloom Again" | Keep on the Sunny Side | 2:37 |

Disc Six (live at the Newport Folk Festival)
| No. | Title | Original Album | Length |
|---|---|---|---|
| 1. | "Big River" | Previously unreleased | 2:12 |
| 2. | "Folsom Prison Blues" | Previously unreleased | 1:53 |
| 3. | "I Still Miss Someone" | Previously unreleased | 1:38 |
| 4. | "Rock Island Line" | Previously unreleased | 3:55 |
| 5. | "Don't Think Twice, It's All Right" | Previously unreleased | 2:44 |
| 6. | "I Walk the Line" | Previously unreleased | 2:32 |
| 7. | "The Ballad of Ira Hayes" | Previously unreleased | 3:25 |
| 8. | "Keep On the Sunny Side" | Previously unreleased | 1:42 |

== Credits ==
- Mastered by Dave Young
- Producers Don Law, Frank Jones, Jack Clement
- Reissue Producers Colin Escott, Richard Weize
