= Greatest Hits, Vol. 1 (Johnny Cash album) =

1967 Johnny Cash Greatest Hits album

Greatest hits album by Johnny Cash
- Released: June 1967
- Recorded: August 13, 1958 – January 11, 1967
- Genre: Country; folk
- Length: 30:46
- Label: Columbia
- Producer: Don Law; Frank Jones

Johnny Cash chronology
Happiness Is You (1966)	Greatest Hits, Vol. 1 (1967)	Carryin' On with Johnny Cash & June Carter (1967)

Professional ratings
Review scores
Source	Rating
AllMusic	4.5/5 stars

Greatest Hits, Vol. 1 is a compilation album by country singer Johnny Cash, released in 1967 on Columbia Records. It marks the first appearance of "Jackson", Cash's famous duet with his then-future wife, June Carter. The track appeared on Carryin' On with Johnny Cash and June Carter, released in August of that same year. The album was certified Gold on July 24, 1969, and Platinum and 2× Platinum on November 21, 1986, by the RIAA.

== Track listing ==
No.	Title	Writer(s)	Original album	Length
1.	"Jackson" (duet with June Carter Cash)	Billy Edd Wheeler, Jerry Leiber (as Gaby Rodgers)	Carryin' On with Johnny Cash and June Carter (1967)	2:48
2.	"I Walk the Line" (re-recording)	Cash	I Walk the Line (1964)	2:37
3.	"Understand Your Man"	Cash	I Walk the Line (1964)	2:45
4.	"Orange Blossom Special"	Ervin T. Rouse	Orange Blossom Special (1965)	3:08
5.	"The One on the Right Is on the Left"	Jack Clement	Everybody Loves a Nut (1966)	2:50
6.	"Ring of Fire"	Merle Kilgore, June Carter	Ring of Fire: The Best of Johnny Cash (1963)	2:39
7.	"It Ain't Me, Babe"	Bob Dylan	Orange Blossom Special (1965)	3:04
8.	"The Ballad of Ira Hayes"	Peter La Farge	Bitter Tears: Ballads of the American Indian (1964)	4:11
9.	"The Rebel – Johnny Yuma"	Richard Markowitz, Andrew Fenady	Ring of Fire: The Best of Johnny Cash (1963)	1:54
10.	"Five Feet High and Rising"	Cash	Songs of Our Soil (1959)	1:49
11.	"Don't Take Your Guns to Town"	Cash	The Fabulous Johnny Cash (1959)	3:01
Total length:				30:46

== Charts ==
Chart (1967)	Peak position
US Top LPs	82
US Top Country LPs	1

Singles

Year	Single	Chart	Position
1967	"Jackson"	US Country Singles	2
