= Ride This Train =

Studio album by Johnny Cash
- Released: 1960
- Recorded: December 14, 1959 – February 16, 1960
- Genre: Country; Western; talking blues
- Length: 32:20
- Label: Columbia
- Producer: Don Law; Al Quaglieri

Johnny Cash chronology
Now, There Was a Song! (1960)	Ride This Train (1960)	Johnny Cash Sings Hank Williams (1960)

Singles from Ride This Train
- 1. "Going to Memphis" Released: 1960

Professional ratings
Review scores
Source	Rating
AllMusic	4.5/5 stars
PopMatters	favorable
The Encyclopedia of Popular Music	4/5 stars
The Rolling Stone Album Guide	3/5 stars

Ride This Train is the sixth album by American country singer-songwriter Johnny Cash. It was released in 1960 and was reissued in 2002, containing four additional bonus tracks.

It is considered Cash's first concept album. The album is billed as a "travelogue", with Cash providing spoken narration before each song to give context, in several cases playing historical characters, such as John Wesley Hardin, and describing different destinations around the United States visited by train. The songs themselves are not generally railroad-themed.

The success of this LP inspired his first label, Sun, to release the compilation LP All Aboard the Blue Train, which consisted of previously released "train"-inspired songs, including his hit "Folsom Prison Blues".

Ride This Train was included on the Bear Family box set Come Along and Ride This Train.

== Track listing ==
Side one
No.	Title	Writer(s)	Length
1.	"Loading Coal"	Merle Travis	4:58
2.	"Slow Rider"	Johnny Cash	4:12
3.	"Lumberjack"	Leon Payne	3:02
4.	"Dorraine of Ponchartrain"	Cash	4:47

Side two
No.	Title	Writer(s)	Length
5.	"Going to Memphis"	Hollie Dew, Alan Lomax; arranged (new words and music) by Johnny Cash	4:26
6.	"When Papa Played the Dobro"	Cash	2:55
7.	"Boss Jack"	Tex Ritter	3:50
8.	"Old Doc Brown"	Red Foley	4:10

Bonus tracks
No.	Title	Writer(s)	Length
9.	"The Fable of Willie Brown"	Cash	1:57
10.	"Second Honeymoon"	Autry Inman	1:57
11.	"Ballad of the Harp Weaver"	Thelma Moore, Edna Millay	3:50
12.	"Smiling Bill McCall"	Cash	2:06
Total length:			42:10

== Personnel ==
- Johnny Cash - vocals, rhythm guitar

The Tennessee Two

- Luther Perkins - lead guitar
- Marshall Grant - bass

Additional musicians

- Johnny Western - guitar
- Floyd Cramer - piano
- Buddy Harman - drums
- Shot Jackson - dobro, steel guitar
- Gordon Terry - fiddle

Technical

- Don Law - Original Recording Producer
- Al Quaglieri - Reissue Producer
- Seth Foster - Mastering
- Mark Wilder - Mastering, Mixing
- Stacey Boyle - Tape Research
- Matt Kelly - Tape Research
- Kay Smith - Tape Research
- Arthur Levy - Liner Notes
- Darren Salmieri - A&R
- Steven Berkowitz - A&R
- Patti Matheny - A&R
- Howard Fritzson - Art Direction
- Alan Lomax - Adaptation, Arranger
- Randall Martin - Design
- Don Hunstein - Photography
- Nick Shaffran - Series Consultant
- Dick Miller - CD Art Adaptation
