= The Unissued Johnny Cash =

Compilation album by Johnny Cash
- Released: 1978
- Recorded: August 1958–August 1962
- Genre: Country
- Label: Bear Family

Johnny Cash chronology
Gone Girl (1978)	The Unissued Johnny Cash (1978)	Johnny & June (1978)

Professional ratings
Review scores
Source	Rating
Allmusic	4.5/5 stars

The Unissued Johnny Cash is a compilation album and 59th overall album by American country singer Johnny Cash, released on Bear Family Records in 1978. It is tailored to completist fans of Cash as it consists entirely of rare or unreleased material from Cash's early Columbia days. The first four tracks, all recorded in August, 1958, are outtakes from The Fabulous Johnny Cash, and also appear on the CD re-release of that album. Likewise, the outtake "The Fable of Willie Brown" appears on the re-release of Ride This Train. The Carter Family song "I'll Be All Smiles Tonight" is an outtake from Blood Sweat and Tears.

"Viel zu spät" and "Wo ist zuhause, Mama" are re-recordings in German of hit songs by Cash. At the time "Don't Take Your Guns to Town" and other country songs were seeing success in Germany, so Columbia had Cash record translations of "I Got Stripes" and "Five Feet High and Rising" for a single.

== Track listing ==
All songs written by Johnny Cash except where noted.

No.	Title	Writer(s)	Recording date	Length
1.	"Mama's Baby"		August 8, 1958	2:21
2.	"Fool's Hall of Fame"	Jerry Freeman, Danny Wolfe	August 8, 1958	2:10
3.	"Walkin' the Blues"	Johnny Cash, Robert Lunn	August 13, 1958	2:19
4.	"Cold Shoulder"	Helene Hudgins	August 13, 1958	2:13
5.	"Viel zu spät" (German version of "I Got Stripes")		October 25, 1959	2:08
6.	"Wo ist Zuhause, Mama" (German version of "Five Feet High and Rising")		October 25, 1959	1:55
7.	"The Fable of Willie Brown"		February 15, 1960	1:57
8.	"The Losing Kind"		May 9, 1960	1:57
9.	"So Do I"		July 19, 1961	2:13
10.	"Shamrock Doesn't Grow in California"		April 23, 1961	2:36
11.	"Danger Zone"		June 8, 1962	2:12
12.	"I'll Be All Smiles Tonight"	A.P. Carter	August 22, 1962	3:12
