= Bonanza (song) =

1962 song by Jay Livingston and Raymond Evans

Single by Al Caiola and His Orchestra
- A-side: "Bonanza" "Bounty Hunter"
- Released: 1961
- Genre: Country
- Label: United Artists 302
- Songwriter: Jay Livingston and Raymond Evans
- Producer: Don Costa

"Bonanza" is the musical theme for the NBC western television series Bonanza starring Lorne Greene. It was written for the series by Jay Livingston and Raymond Evans.

In 1961, it became a hit for Al Caiola and His Orchestra, whose instrumental recording (United Artists 302, backed with "Bounty Hunter") reached number 19 on the Billboard Hot 100.

== Johnny Cash version ==
"Bonanza!"

Single by Johnny Cash

from the album Ring of Fire
- A-side: "Bonanza!" "Pick a Bale o' Cotton"
- Released: July 20, 1962
- Genre: Country
- Length: 2:24
- Label: Columbia 4-42512
- Producers: Don Law and Frank Jones

Audio
- "Bonanza!" on YouTube

Professional ratings
Review scores
Source	Rating
Billboard	3/4 stars

Johnny Cash recorded his own version, with lyrics rewritten by him and his friend Johnny Western, and released it as a single on Columbia Records (Columbia 4-42512, "Bonanza!" with "Pick a Bale o' Cotton" on the opposite side) in July or August 1962. The Billboard magazine evaluated the single upon its release as having a "moderate sales potential", but "Bonanza" only grazed the Hot 100 and entirely missed the Billboard country chart, while "Pick a Bale o' Cotton" didn't make either.

=== Background ===
Rather than release another single from the album [The Sound of Johnny Cash (1962)], Columbia chose to issue "Bonanza," the theme to the hit television show, with lyrics rewritten by Cash and Johnny Western. The song briefly touched the Pop chart at #94 before dropping off, and did not hit the Country charts at all. The B-side was another Leadbelly adaptation, "Pick a Bale o' Cotton," that also failed to attract much attention.

— C. Eric Banister. Johnny Cash FAQ: All That's Left to Know About the Man in Black

In 1963 Cash took another stab at a TV western theme song by cowriting and recording "Bonanza." This time, he and friend Johnny Western wrote their own lyrics to the musical theme, composed by Jay Livingston and Ray Evans, for the television series Bonanza. Cash's version was never used on the TV series about the Cartwright family, starring Lorne Greene, Pernell Roberts, Dan Blocker, and Michael Landon. But he did release it and include it on the Ring of Fire album. Interestingly, Cash would record a duet version of "Shifting Whispering Sands" with Lorne Greene.

— John M. Alexander. The Man in Song: A Discographic Biography of Johnny Cash

=== Track listing ===
7" single (Columbia 42512, 1962)
No.	Title	Writer(s)	Length
1.	"Pick a Bale o' Cotton"	Johnny Cash	1:56
2.	"Bonanza!"	Jay Livingston – Raymond Evans	2:24

== Charts ==
Al Caiola and His Orchestra version

Chart (1961)	Peak position
US Billboard Hot 100	19

Johnny Cash version

Chart (1962)	Peak position
US Cash Box Country Singles	24
US Billboard Hot 100	94
