= American Recordings =

American Recordings may refer to:

- American Recordings (record label), a US record label
- American Recordings (album), a 1994 album by Johnny Cash
