= The Johnny Cash Children's Album =

Studio album by Johnny Cash
- Released: January 1975
- Recorded: January 1972–October 1973
- Genre: Country; children's
- Length: 35:33
- Label: Columbia
- Producer: Johnny Cash; Charlie Bragg; Larry Butler

Johnny Cash chronology
Five Feet High and Rising (1974)	The Johnny Cash Children's Album (1975)	Johnny Cash Sings Precious Memories (1975)

Professional ratings
Review scores
Source	Rating
Allmusic	3/5 stars

The Johnny Cash Children's Album is the 49th album by country singer Johnny Cash, released on Columbia Records in 1975, featuring recordings made between January 1972 and October 1973. As the title implies, it contains songs written for children. Among others, this includes "Tiger Whitehead", a song later released in an acoustic version on Cash's posthumous Personal File album in 2006. Most of the songs on the album had not been performed by Cash before. "Old Shep" had been performed by Elvis Presley, among others. One track recorded in 1972 was previously released on LP: "I Got a Boy (And His Name is John)" was first made available on the 1972 album International Superstar. It is a tongue-in-cheek duet between Cash and his wife, June Carter Cash, about their son, John Carter Cash.

The Johnny Cash Children's Album was reissued in 2006 on Legacy Recordings, with four bonus tracks, including Henry Clay Work's "My Grandfather's Clock". An early version of "My Grandfather's Clock" was recorded in 1958 and is available on Songs of Our Soil. The song "Old Shep" was also re-released on the 2005 boxed set The Legend.

== Track listing ==
No.	Title	Writer(s)	Length
1.	"Nasty Dan"	Jeff Moss	2:07
2.	"One and One Makes Two"	Jeff Moss	2:24
3.	"I Got a Boy (and His Name is John)" (with June Carter Cash)	Johnny Cash	2:55
4.	"Little Magic Glasses"	Johnny Cash	2:22
5.	"Miss Tara"	Johnny Cash	2:08
6.	"Dinosaur Song"	Johnny Cash; June Carter Cash	1:28
7.	"Tiger Whitehead"	Johnny Cash; Nat Winston	3:13
8.	"There's a Bear in the Woods" (re-issue bonus track)	Johnny Cash	2:23
9.	"Call of the Wild"	J. D. Carter	2:54
10.	"Little Green Fountain" (with June Carter Cash)	Johnny Cash; June Carter Cash	1:50
11.	"Old Shep"	Red Foley	2:25
12.	"The Timber Man"	Johnny Cash	2:49
13.	"My Grandfather's Clock" (re-issue bonus track)	Henry Clay Work	3:40
14.	"Ah Bos Cee Dah" (re-issue bonus track)	Johnny Cash	2:35
15.	"Why Is a Fire Engine Red" (re-issue bonus track)	Johnny Cash	1:20

Note: Johnny Cash first recorded a version of "My Grandfather's Clock" on March 12, 1959, for Songs of Our Soil.

== Personnel ==
- Johnny Cash - vocals, acoustic guitar
- Ray Edenton, Larry Gatlin, David Jones, Red Lane, Jerry Shook - guitar
- Carl Perkins, Bob Wootton - electric guitar
- Larry Butler, Larry McCoy, Bill Pursell, Bill Walker, Jerry Whitehurst - piano
- Marshall Grant - bass
- W.S. "Fluke" Holland, William Don Favorite - drums
- June Carter Cash, Rosie Nix - backing vocals

Additional personnel

- Produced by Johnny Cash and Charlie Bragg
- Tracks 4, 5, 8, 9, 12, 13, and 15 Produced by Larry Butler
- Reissue Produced by Gregg Geller
- Reissue mastered by Vic Anesini at Sony Music Studios, New York
- Legacy A&R: Steve Berkowitz
- Project Designer: John Jackson
- A&R Coordination: Jeremy Holiday and Stacey Boyle
- Art Direction: Howard Fritzson
- Design: Ron Kellum/Kellum McClain Inc.
- Project Manager: Triana D'Orazio
- Photography: Al Clayton (original LP), J.P. Philips (two black-and-white photos)
