= Bad News (John D. Loudermilk song) =

Song by Johnny Cash

Single by Johnny Cash

from the album I Walk the Line
- A-side: "The Ballad of Ira Hayes"
- Released: June 2, 1964
- Genre: Country
- Length: 2:56
- Label: Columbia 4-43058
- Songwriter: John D. Loudermilk
- Producers: Don Law and Frank Jones

Audio
- "Bad News" on YouTube

"Bad News" is a song written by and originally released by John D. Loudermilk, whose version reached #23 on the U.S. Billboard country chart in 1963.

== Johnny Cash version ==
Johnny Cash recorded this song for his album I Walk the Line in May 1964.

Released as a single (Columbia 4-43058, with "The Ballad of Ira Hayes" on the opposite side) in June 1964, Cash's version peaked at #8 of the Billboard country chart for two weeks. ("The Ballad of Ira Hayes" was more popular, reaching number 3.)

=== Analysis ===
"Bad News" depicts a [...] drifter [...] who has a bad reputation and is known as bad news everywhere he goes. He laughs maniacally as he recounts the failed attempts to slow him down or hang him, but the rebel in him just taunts authority and continues to laugh in the face of those who chase after him. It's a unique take, and a nice play on Johnny's original outlaw reputation. John D. Loudermilk wrote this song, which sounds tailor-made for Cash. It's fun to listen to him grunt and carry on as he recounts all he has to do to stay free of those who want to capture him.

— John M. Alexander. The Man in Song: A Discographic Biography of Johnny Cash

"Bad News," one of three new songs on the album [I Walk the Line], had been recorded earlier in 1963 by its writer, John D. Loudermilk, a cousin of Charlie and Ira Loudermilk—or, as they were better known, the Louvin Brothers. Loudermilk's recording went to #23 on the Country charts but stalled out after that. Blake's Dobro adds some added swagger to Cash's version, while the singer's rumbling laugh and raspy voice brings a menacing quality.

— C. Eric Banister. Johnny Cash FAQ: All That's Left to Know About the Man in Black

== Track listing ==
7" single (Columbia 4-43058, 1964)
No.	Title	Writer(s)	Length
1.	"Bad News"	J. D. Loudermilk	2:56
2.	"The Ballad of Ira Hayes"	P. La Farge	4:07

== Personnel ==
- Johnny Cash – vocal, guitar
- Norman Blake – dobro
- Carter Family: Maybelle, Anita, Helen, June – vocal harmony
- Jack Clement – guitar
- Marshall Grant – bass
- W.S. Holland – drums
- Luther Perkins – electric guitar
- Bill Pursell – piano

== Charts ==
Chart (1964)	Peak position
US Hot Country Songs (Billboard)	8
