= Johnny & June =

Compilation album by Johnny Cash
- Released: 1978
- Recorded: February 1960–December 1965
- Genre: Country; folk
- Label: Bear Family
- Producer: Don Law; Frank Jones; Gerd Schmidt

Johnny Cash chronology
The Unissued Johnny Cash (1978)	Johnny & June (1978)	Tall Man (1979)

Professional ratings
Review scores
Source	Rating
Allmusic	4.5/5 stars

Johnny & June is a compilation album and 60th overall album by American country singer Johnny Cash, released on Bear Family Records in 1978 (see 1978 in music). Like The Unissued Johnny Cash it consists of material that was either unreleased or not widely available. Most of the songs were recorded from 1964 to 1965, with the exception of "Smiling Bill McCall" from 1960. The songs, "Cotton Picking Hands" and "Wer Kennt Den Weg" and "In Virginia" (both in German) had been previously released on singles. "Thunderball" was recorded for the James Bond film, but was ultimately turned down in favor of Tom Jones (see also the Thunderball film and soundtrack articles).

"One Too Many Mornings" is a Bob Dylan song from The Times They Are a-Changin'. Cash and Dylan would later record a duet version of the song for Nashville Skyline, and Cash would record the song again for Heroes with Waylon Jennings. This version features Maybelle Carter playing autoharp. The Carters feature on several songs on the album; June Carter sings lead vocal on three songs and duets on another, and Anita Carter sings on "That's What It's Like to Be Lonesome."

== Track listing ==
Track listing:

No.	Title	Writer(s)	Recording date	Length
1.	"(I'm Proud) The Baby Is Mine"	Cash	December 17, 1964
2.	"Cotton Pickin' Hands"	Cash, June Carter Cash	December 10, 1965
3.	"Close the Door Lightly When You Go" (vocal by June Carter Cash)	Eric Anderson	September 21, 1965
4.	"That's What It's Like to Be Lonesome" (vocal by Anita Carter)	Eric Anderson	February 3, 1965
5.	"Thunderball"	Cash	May 12, 1965
6.	"One Too Many Mornings"	Bob Dylan	October 29, 1965
7.	"How Did You Get Away from Me" (with June Carter Cash)	Anita Carter, June Carter, Cash, Eric Anderson	March 5, 1964
8.	"Adios Aloha" (vocal by June Carter)	June Carter, Don Davis, Eric Anderson	December 20, 1964
9.	"Wer Kennt Den Weg" (German version of "I Walk the Line")	Cash, Günter Loose	June 19, 1965
10.	"Ain't You Ashamed" (vocal by June Carter Cash)	Cash, Cash, Anderson	March 5, 1964
11.	"Smiling Bill McCall"	Cash	February 16, 1960
12.	"In Virginia"	Goetz, Kaegbein	June 19, 1965
