= American Recordings (album) =

Studio album by Johnny Cash
- Released: April 26, 1994
- Recorded: May 17–20, 1993; December 3–7, 1993
- Studios: Rick Rubin's living room (Los Angeles); Johnny Cash's cabin (Hendersonville, Tennessee); The Viper Room (Los Angeles)
- Genre: Country
- Length: 42:45
- Label: American
- Producer: Rick Rubin

Johnny Cash chronology
| Wanted Man (1994) | American Recordings (1994) | The Man in Black 1963–1969 (1995) |

American series chronology
| American Recordings (1994) | Unchained (1996) |

Singles from American Recordings
- 1. "Delia's Gone" Released: May 1994; 2. "Drive On" Released: July 1994

American Recordings is the 81st overall album by American country singer Johnny Cash. It was released on April 26, 1994 by American Recordings, after it had changed its name from Def American.

The album marked the beginning of a career resurgence for Cash, who was widely recognized as an icon of American music but whose record sales had suffered during the late 1970s and 1980s.

== Background ==
Cash was approached by producer Rick Rubin and offered a contract with Rubin's Def American Recordings label, better known for rap and heavy metal than for country music. Rubin had seen Cash perform at Bob Dylan's 30th anniversary concert in late 1992, and felt Cash was still a vital artist who had been unfairly written off by the music industry.

Suffering from health problems and recovering from a relapse of his drug addiction, Cash was initially skeptical. The two men soon bonded, however, particularly when Rubin promised Cash a high level of creative control. Rubin told the singer: "I would like you to do whatever feels right for you", and Cash decided to record the first solo album of his career without any accompanying musicians. "Sitting and talking and playing music… that was when we got to build up a friendship," Rubin recalled. "My fondest memories are just of hanging out and hearing his stories. He didn't speak much but, if you drew him out, he seemed to know everything. He was shy and quiet but a wise, wise man."

== Recording and production ==
Under Rubin's supervision, Cash recorded most of the album in his own Tennessee cabin or Rubin's home in Los Angeles, accompanied only by his guitar. This was a return to Cash's earliest recording style. His first producer, Sam Phillips, had determined in the 1950s that Cash's voice was best suited to a stripped-down style and a three or four-piece ensemble. These groups were called the Tennessee Two or Tennessee Three, depending on their personnel: Cash on vocals and guitar, backed with another guitarist and upright bass, and sometimes drums. Subsequent producers deviated from this style with more ornate backing; Cash disagreed with Jack Clement in the 1960s when the producer tried to give Cash's songs a fashionable "twangy" feel and to add frills like orchestral string sections and barbershop quartet-style backup singers. In his autobiography, Cash wrote about his frustration with Columbia Records in the 1970s and 1980s, due in part to creative disagreements, such as recording his vocals separately from the backing musicians.

"Tennessee Stud" and "The Man Who Couldn't Cry" were recorded live at the Viper Room, a Sunset Strip, Los Angeles nightclub owned at the time by Johnny Depp. "The Beast in Me" was written and originally recorded by Cash's former stepson-in-law Nick Lowe. Rubin commissioned new songs from several musicians, two of which ended up on American Recordings. "Down There By The Train" was a spiritual or gospel style song of redemption by Tom Waits. "Thirteen" was a more ominous composition by Glenn Danzig, whose heavy metal band had earlier worked with Rubin; Danzig wrote the song specifically for Cash in less than twenty minutes.

Two songs on the album had been recorded by Cash previously: "Delia's Gone", for the 1962 album The Sound of Johnny Cash and "Oh, Bury Me Not", for 1965's Johnny Cash Sings the Ballads of the True West.

The album cover was photographed while Cash was visiting Australia, at Werribee near Melbourne.

== Critical reception ==
Professional ratings
Initial reviews (in 1994)
Review scores
| Source | Rating |
|---|---|
| Chicago Tribune | 4/4 stars |
| Entertainment Weekly | A |
| Los Angeles Times | 4/4 stars |
| NME | 9/10 |
| Rolling Stone | 5/5 stars |
| Select | 4/5 medals |

Professional ratings
Retrospective reviews (after 1994)
Review scores
| Source | Rating |
|---|---|
| AllMusic | 4.5/5 stars |
| Encyclopedia of Popular Music | 4/5 stars |
| MusicHound Country | 5/5 |
| Pitchfork | 8.2/10 |
| The Rolling Stone Album Guide | 5/5 stars |

American Recordings received nearly universal acclaim from critics. Q magazine deemed it the year's most sincere and ambitious record, while NME found it "uplifting and life affirming because the message is taught through adversity, ill luck and fighting for survival". David Browne, writing in Entertainment Weekly, said Cash remained a captivating singer throughout the austerely arranged country ballads and bizarre reflections, calling the record "his most relaxed and folkiest album in three decades". In a rave review in Rolling Stone, Anthony DeCurtis hailed it as one of Cash's greatest albums because of his self-possessed, "biblically intense" take on traditional folk songs and Rubin's no-frills production: "American Recordings is at once monumental and viscerally intimate, fiercely true to the legend of Johnny Cash and entirely contemporary." Mark Cooper from Mojo called it a "breathtaking blend of the confessional and the self-mythologising". In the Chicago Tribune, Greg Kot wrote that Cash's singing was effectively dramatic throughout "the quagmire of humor and bloodshed, pathos and treachery evoked by these songs", while Los Angeles Times critic Randy Lewis said they "peer into the dark corners of the American soul" on what was a "milestone work" for Cash.

AllMusic's Mark Deming wrote that the album "became a critical sensation and a commercial success, though it was overrated in some quarters simply because it reminded audiences that one of America's greatest musical talents was still capable of making compelling music, something he had never stopped doing even if no one bothered to listen."

At the end of 1994, American Recordings was voted the seventh best album of the year in the Pazz & Jop, an annual poll of American critics nationwide. In other year-end lists, it was ranked 36th by Select, 23rd by NME, 19th by Rockdelux, 17th by Les Inrockuptibles, 15th by The Face, 5th by the Los Angeles Times, 4th by Mojo, and 2nd by OOR. At the 1995 Grammy Awards, it won Cash a Grammy Award for Best Contemporary Folk Album. In 2006, Country Music Television (CMT) ranked the record number 27 on the network's list of the top 40 greatest country albums in 2006, and in 2009 Rolling Stone placed it at number 366 on the magazine's list of the 500 Greatest Albums of All Time.

== Track listing ==
| No. | Title | Writer(s) | Recording date | Length |
|---|---|---|---|---|
| 1. | "Delia's Gone" | Johnny Cash, Karl Silbersdorf, Dick Toops | December 5, 1993 | 2:18 |
| 2. | "Let the Train Blow the Whistle" | Cash | December 5, 1993 | 2:15 |
| 3. | "The Beast in Me" | Nick Lowe | December 5, 1993 | 2:45 |
| 4. | "Drive On" | Cash | December 6, 1993 | 2:23 |
| 5. | "Why Me Lord" | Kris Kristofferson | December 7, 1993 | 2:20 |
| 6. | "Thirteen" | Glenn Danzig | December 7, 1993 | 2:29 |
| 7. | "Oh, Bury Me Not" (Introduction: "A Cowboy's Prayer") | Traditional | May 17–20, 1993 | 3:52 |
| 8. | "Bird on a Wire" | Leonard Cohen | December 6, 1993 | 4:01 |
| 9. | "Tennessee Stud" | Jimmy Driftwood | December 3, 1993 | 2:54 |
| 10. | "Down There by the Train" | Tom Waits | December 7, 1993 | 5:34 |
| 11. | "Redemption" | Cash | December 6, 1993 | 3:03 |
| 12. | "Like a Soldier" | Cash | December 6, 1993 | 2:50 |
| 13. | "The Man Who Couldn't Cry" | Loudon Wainwright III | December 3, 1993 | 5:03 |

== Personnel ==
- Johnny Cash – vocals, acoustic guitar, main performer, liner notes
- Rick Rubin – producer
- Jim Scott – mixing
- David R. Ferguson – engineer
- Stephen Marcussen – mastering
- Christine Cano – design
- Martyn Atkins – art director, photographer

== Charts ==
| Album Chart | Peak position |
|---|---|
| US Billboard 200 | 110 |
| US Top Country Albums (Billboard) | 23 |
| Canadian Country Albums (RPM) | 9 |
| Canadian Albums (RPM) | 72 |
| Greek Albums (IFPI) | 71 |
| UK Country Albums (Official Charts) | 2 |
| Scottish Albums (Official Charts) | 87 |
| French Albums (SNEP) | 196 |

== Certifications ==
| Region | Certification | Certified units/sales |
|---|---|---|
| United Kingdom (BPI) | Silver | 60,000^{^} |
| United States | — | 236,000 |
^{^} Shipments figures based on certification alone.
