= Now, There Was a Song! =

Studio album by Johnny Cash
- Released: 1960
- Genres: Country; honky-tonk
- Length: 26:19
- Label: Columbia/Legacy
- Producers: Don Law; Frank Jones

Johnny Cash chronology
Greatest! (1960)	Now, There Was a Song! (1960)	Ride This Train (1960)

Singles from Now, There Was a Song!
- 1. "Seasons of My Heart / Smiling Bill McCall" Released: 1960

Professional ratings
Review scores
Source	Rating
AllMusic	4.5/5 stars
The Rolling Stone Album Guide	2.5/5 stars

Now, There Was a Song! is the fifth studio album by American singer Johnny Cash. It features songs by notable country singers Ernest Tubb, Hank Williams, Hank Thompson, Bob Wills, Marty Robbins, and George Jones. It was released in 1960 on the Columbia record label.

== Track listing ==
Side one
No.	Title	Writer(s)	Length
1.	"Seasons of My Heart"	Darrell Edwards, George Jones	2:29
2.	"I Feel Better All Over"	Kenny Rogers, Leon Smith	2:03
3.	"I Couldn't Keep from Crying"	Marty Robbins	2:08
4.	"Time Changes Everything"	Tommy Duncan	1:49
5.	"My Shoes Keep Walking Back to You"	Lee Ross, Bob Wills	2:21
6.	"I'd Just Be Fool Enough (To Fall)"	Melvin Endsley	2:05

Side two
No.	Title	Writer(s)	Length
7.	"Transfusion Blues"	T.J. "Red" Arnall	2:32
8.	"Why Do You Punish Me (For Loving You)"	Erwin King	2:18
9.	"I Will Miss You When You Go"	Baby Stewart, Ernest Tubb	2:01
10.	"I'm So Lonesome I Could Cry"	Hank Williams	2:38
11.	"Just One More"	George Jones	2:12
12.	"Honky-Tonk Girl"	Chuck Harding, Hank Thompson	1:58

== Personnel ==
- Johnny Cash - vocals, rhythm guitar

Tennessee Two

- Luther Perkins - lead guitar
- Marshall Grant - bass

with:

- Johnny Western - rhythm guitar
- Floyd Cramer - piano
- Buddy Harman - drums
- Gordon Terry - fiddle
- Don Helms - steel guitar

== Charts ==
Singles - Billboard (United States)

Year	Single	Chart	Position
1960	"Seasons of My Heart"	Country Singles	10
