= Honky-Tonk Girl (Hank Thompson song) =

Single by Hank Thompson and His Brazos Valley Boys
- A-side: "Honky-Tonk Girl" "We've Gone Too Far"
- Released: 1954
- Recorded: 1954
- Genre: country
- Length: 2:25
- Label: Capitol 2823
- Songwriters: Hank Thompson, Chuck Harding

Hank Thompson and His Brazos Valley Boys singles chronology
"A Fooler, A Faker" (1954)	"Honky-Tonk Girl" (1954)	"We've Gone Too Far" (1954)

Music video
- "Honky-Tonk Girl" (audio only) on YouTube

"Honky-Tonk Girl"

Single by Johnny Cash

from the album Now, There Was a Song!
- A-side: "Honky-Tonk Girl" "Second Honeymoon"
- Released: 1960
- Genre: country
- Label: Columbia 4-41707
- Songwriter: Autry Inman

Music video
- "Honky-Tonk Girl" (audio only) on YouTube

"Honky-Tonk Girl" is a song co-written and originally recorded by Hank Thompson. Released by him on Capitol Records in 1954, it was a nationwide country hit in the United States that year (reaching country number nine on Billboard).

The song was notably covered by Johnny Cash.

Cash's version was released as a single by Columbia Records (Columbia 4-41707, with "Second Honeymoon" on the opposite side) in June or July 1960.

== Composition ==
The song evokes a barroom atmosphere.

== Charts ==
Johnny Cash version

Chart (1960)	Peak position
US Billboard Hot 100	92
