= Carryin' On with Johnny Cash & June Carter =

Studio album by Johnny Cash and June Carter
- Released: August 1, 1967
- Recorded: August 27, 1964–May 22, 1967
- Genres: Country; rock and roll
- Length: 28:31
- Label: Columbia
- Producer: Don Law

Johnny Cash chronology
Greatest Hits, Vol. 1 (1967)	Carryin' On with Johnny Cash & June Carter (1967)	From Sea to Shining Sea (1968)

Singles from Carryin' On with Johnny Cash & June Carter
- 1. "It Ain't Me Babe" Released: October 6, 1964; 2. "Jackson" Released: February 6, 1967; 3. "Long-Legged Guitar Pickin' Man" Released: May 22, 1967

Professional ratings
Review scores
Source	Rating
Allmusic	link
The Rolling Stone Album Guide	3/5 stars

Carryin' On with Johnny Cash & June Carter is an album by Johnny Cash and June Carter released in 1967 (see 1967 in music), on Columbia Records. The album consists exclusively of duets by Cash and Carter, including "Jackson"; "Long-Legged Guitar Pickin' Man" (written by Cash's bass player, Marshall Grant) was also released as a single. One track, a cover of Bob Dylan's "It Ain't Me, Babe", dated back to 1964 and had previously been released on Cash's 1965 album, Orange Blossom Special.

Cash and Carter married seven months after the album was released (with Carter subsequently changing her professional name to June Carter Cash), and the couple performed "Jackson" at numerous venues throughout the years. The album was re-issued on March 19, 2002, through Legacy Recordings, with two additional tracks.

== Track listing ==
Adapted from Apple Music and Tidal:

No.	Title	Writer(s)	Length
1.	"Long-Legged Guitar Pickin' Man"	Marshall Grant	2:37
2.	"Shantytown"	Johnny Cash, June Carter	2:23
3.	"It Ain't Me, Babe"	Bob Dylan	3:06
4.	"Fast Boat to Sydney"	June Carter, Helen Carter, Anita Carter	2:31
5.	"Pack Up Your Sorrows"	Richard Fariña, Pauline Marden	2:29
6.	"I Got a Woman"	Ray Charles	3:17
7.	"Jackson"	Billy Ed Wheeler, Jerry Leiber (as Gaby Rodgers)	2:48
8.	"Oh, What a Good Thing We Had"	Cash, June Carter	2:46
9.	"You'll Be All Right"	Cash, June Carter	1:49
10.	"No No No"	Cash	1:52
11.	"What'd I Say"	Ray Charles	2:53
Total length:			28:31

Bonus tracks
No.	Title	Writer(s)	Length
12.	"The Wind Changes"	Cash	2:50
13.	"From Sea to Shining Sea"	Traditional, Cash	1:35
Total length:			32:56

== Personnel ==
Credits adapted from Tidal:

- Johnny Cash - vocals, guitar
- June Carter - vocals
- Carl Perkins, Luther Perkins, Bob Johnson - guitar
- Norman Blake - guitar, dobro
- Marshall Grant - bass
- W.S. Holland - drums
- Charlie McCoy - harmonica
- Bill McElhiney, Karl Garvin - trumpet
- Phil Balsey, Jan Howard, The Carter Family - backing vocals

== Charts ==
Album – Billboard (United States)

Year	Chart	Position
1967	Country Albums	5
1967	Billboard 200	194

Singles - Billboard (United States)

Year	Single	Chart	Position
1967	"Jackson"	Country Singles	2
1967	"Long-Legged Guitar Pickin' Man"	Country Singles	6
