= Hymns from the Heart =

Studio album by Johnny Cash
- Released: 1962
- Recorded: February 28 – April 27, 1961
- Studio: Radio Recorders, Hollywood; Bradley Film & Recording Studio, Nashville
- Genre: Gospel
- Length: 28:56
- Label: Columbia
- Producer: Don Law; Frank Jones

Johnny Cash chronology
Now Here's Johnny Cash (1961)	Hymns from the Heart (1962)	The Sound of Johnny Cash (1962)

Professional ratings
Review scores
Source	Rating
AllMusic	2.5/5 stars

Hymns from the Heart is the seventh studio album and the second gospel album by American singer Johnny Cash, released in 1962. It features a selection of gospel songs, and is the second album of this type released by Cash, the first being Hymns by Johnny Cash. This album has a more traditional hymn/gospel feel than Cash's previous hymns album.

== Cover imagery ==
The album cover photograph was made by Leigh Wiener at Gene Autry's Melody Movie Ranch in Newhall, Santa Clarita, California.

== Track listing ==
Side one
No.	Title	Writer(s)	Recording date	Length
1.	"He'll Understand and Say Well Done"	Roger Wilson	February 28 & March 23, 1961	2:27
2.	"God Must Have My Fortune Laid Away"	Ted Harris	February 28 & March 23, 1961	2:49
3.	"When I've Learned Enough to Die"	Ray Baker, Buddy Killen, Delbert Wilson	February 28 & March 23, 1961	2:47
4.	"I Got Shoes"	Arranged and adapted by Johnny Cash	February 28 & March 23, 1961	2:01
5.	"Let the Lower Lights Be Burning"	Philip Bliss	April 26, 1961	2:14
6.	"If We Never Meet Again"	Albert E. Brumley	April 26, 1961	3:02

Side two
No.	Title	Writer(s)	Recording date	Length
7.	"When I Take My Vacation in Heaven"	Herbert Buffum, R.E. Winsett	April 27, 1961	2:26
8.	"When He Reached Down His Hand for Me"	G.E. Wright	April 27, 1961	2:04
9.	"Taller Than Trees"	Lee Ferebee	April 27, 1961	1:52
10.	"I Won't Have to Cross Jordan Alone"	Charles Durham, Thomas Ramsey	April 27, 1961	3:00
11.	"My God Is Real (Yes, God Is Real)"	Kenneth Morris	April 27, 1961	2:00
12.	"These Hands"	Eddie Noack	April 27, 1961	2:14

== Personnel ==
- Johnny Cash – vocals, acoustic guitar, rhythm guitar

The Tennessee Three

- Luther Perkins – electric guitar, lead guitar
- Marshall Grant – bass
- W.S. Holland – drums

Additional musicians

- Billy Strange – guitar
- Ray Edenton – guitar
- Buddy Clark – bass
- Irving Kluger – drums
- Floyd Cramer – piano
- Bill Pursell – organ
- Billy Lathum – banjo
- Marvin Hughes, Hubert Anderson – vibraphone
- Elliot Fisher, Anthony Olson, Frank Green, Olcott Vail, Joseph Livotti, Bobby Bruce – violin
- Gary White, Myron Sander – viola
- William E. Liebert – leader
