= Tall Man (album) =

Compilation album by Johnny Cash
- Released: 1979
- Recorded: February 1961–October 1967
- Genre: Country
- Label: Bear Family BFX 15033

Johnny Cash chronology
Johnny & June (1978)	Tall Man (1979)	Silver (1979)

Professional ratings
Review scores
Source	Rating
Allmusic	4.5/5 stars

Tall Man is a compilation album by American country singer Johnny Cash, released on Bear Family Records in 1979. Like the preceding two Bear Family Cash releases, it consists of rarities and unreleased songs. "Besser So, Jenny-Jo" and "Kleine Rosemarie" were recorded in German for that audience. "Tall Man" is from the soundtrack to the 1961 film Cindy, and was listed when released by Cash as the 'B' side to "Tennessee Flat Top Box" as "Tall Men". "Pick a Bale of Cotton" and "Hammers and Nails" were previously released as singles. "Rodeo Hand" is an outtake from Sings the Ballads of the True West. "Engine 143," an A.P. Carter song, which was re-recorded for a Carter Family tribute album in 2003.

== Track listing ==
No.	Title	Writer(s)	Recording date	Length
1.	"Tall Man"	Ken Darby	February 27, 1961	1:56
2.	"Foolish Questions"	Johnny Cash	January 12, 1966	3:12
3.	"Pick a Bale of Cotton"	Lead Belly, Alan Lomax	June 8, 1962	1:59
4.	"I Tremble for You"	Johnny Cash, Lew DeWitt	October 3, 1967	2:14
5.	"Besser So, Jenny-Jo"	Burgner, Kurt Hertha	June 20, 1965	2:12
6.	"Kleine Rosemarie"	Karl Götz, Günter Loose	June 20, 1965	1:57
7.	"My Old Faded Rose"	June Carter Cash, Johnny Cash	June 29, 1964	2:53
8.	"Rodeo Hand"	Peter La Farge	March 13, 1965	2:26
9.	"The Sound of Laughter"	Harlan Howard	January 29, 1966	2:35
10.	"Hammers and Nails" (with the Statler Brothers)	Lucille Groah	April 3, 1964	2:38
11.	"Engine 143"	A.P. Carter	December 20, 1964	3:35
12.	"On the Line"	Traditional	January 12, 1967	2:22
