= Gaby Rodgers =

American actress

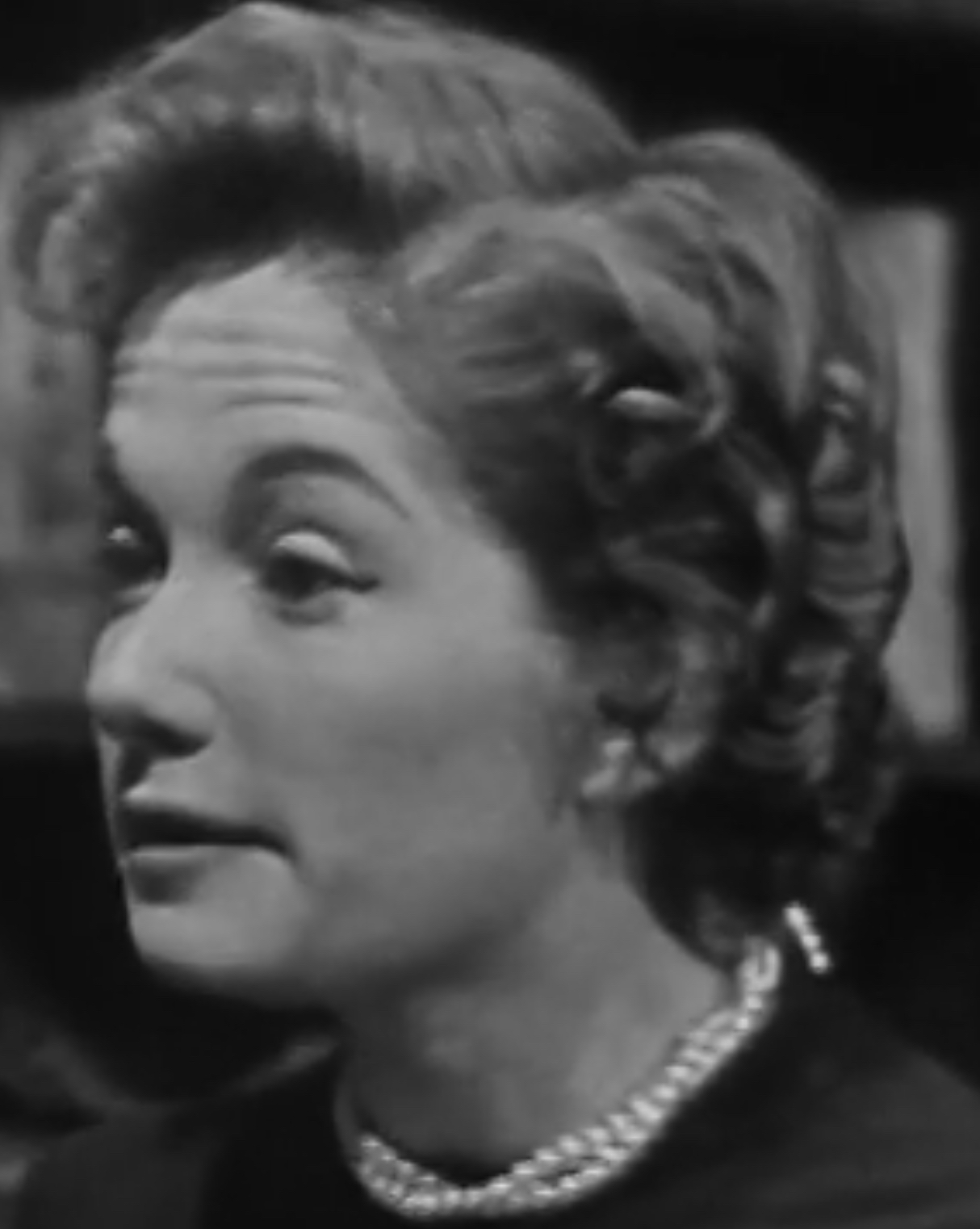
- Rodgers in an episode of Tales of Tomorrow (1953)
- Born: Gabrielle Rosenberg; March 29, 1928 (age 97); Frankfurt-am-Main, German Reich
- Occupations: Actress; journalist; theatre director
- Notable work: Kiss Me Deadly
- Relatives: Jakob Rosenberg (uncle); Edmund Husserl (grand-uncle)

Gaby Rodgers (born Gabrielle Rosenberg; March 29, 1928) is a German-born American actress, theater director, and journalist.

== Early years ==
Born Gabriel Beale Rosenberg, Rodgers is the daughter of Jewish art dealer Saemy Rosenberg, the niece of art historian Jakob Rosenberg and the great-niece of the philosopher Edmund Husserl. Rodgers was born in Frankfurt-am-Main, Germany, but immigrated with her family to Amsterdam, London and finally into the United States as refugees from the Nazi regime in Germany. In Amsterdam, she played marbles with Anne Frank as her family knew the Franks.

Rodgers graduated from Mount Holyoke College in 1948. While there she belonged to the speech club and dramatics club and participated in the college's radio workshop. Her activities with the workshop included being helping to produce "A Nickel and a Prayer", a 30-minute program that was broadcast on WACE on February 21, 1948.

== Career ==
Although she worked extensively as a television actress in the 1950s, Rodgers is perhaps best remembered as Lily Carver in the 1955 film Kiss Me Deadly. Her only other film role was in the 1953 New York indie The Big Break. She appeared on the cover of the January 1957 issue of Cosmopolitan, representing "The New Face of Broadway". Rodgers continued to work as a stage actress and director into the new century.

=== Stage ===
Rodgers first acted at the Barter Theatre when she was 19 years old after she was selected by Shirley Booth during tryouts in New York, and she appeared in the Barter production of Sweet Fire (1952). She also acted at the Provincetown Playhouse and the Bucks County Playhouse. Rodgers's Broadway credits include The Heavenly Twins (1955), Mister Johnson (1956), The Hidden River (1957), and Two for the Seesaw (1958).

== Personal life ==
Rodgers was married for many years to lyricist Jerry Leiber, half of the songwriting team of Leiber & Stoller, who wrote "Hound Dog", "Jailhouse Rock", and other songs. Rodgers frequently is cited as co-author of the song "Jackson" with Billy Edd Wheeler, but this is untrue; Leiber wrote the song with Wheeler, using his then-wife's name as a pseudonym.

== Recognition ==
In May 1956 Rodgers was a recipient of one of the Theatre World Awards, presented to "the promising personalities of the 1955-56 season".
