= Top Country Albums =

Weekly country music rankings published by Billboard magazine in the United States

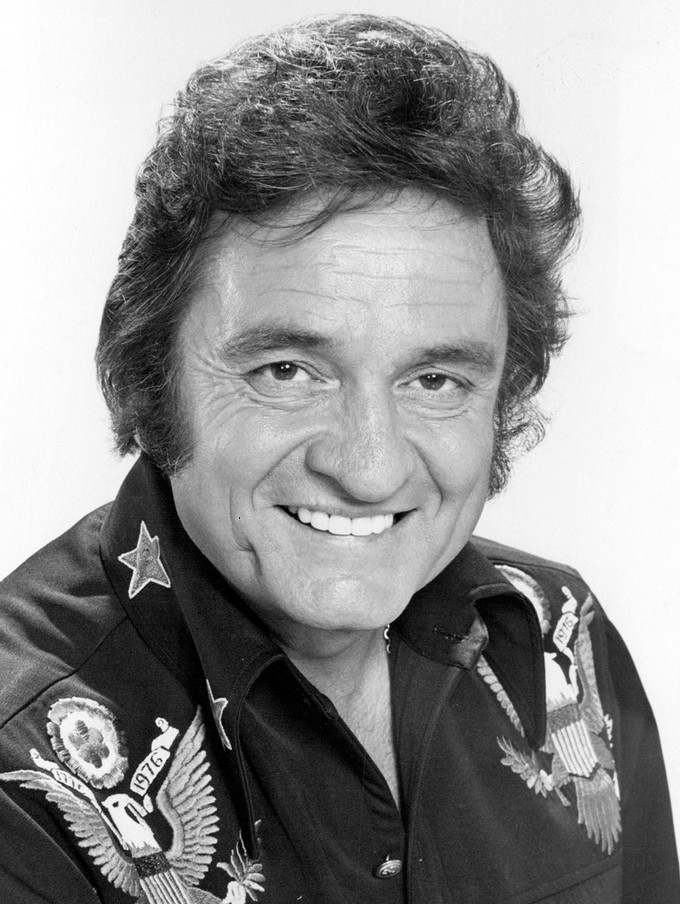
Johnny Cash had the first number one on the country albums chart.

Top Country Albums is a chart published weekly by Billboard magazine in the United States. The 50-position chart lists the most popular country music albums in the country, calculated weekly by Broadcast Data Systems based on physical sales along with digital sales and streaming. The chart was first published in the issue of Billboard dated January 11, 1964, under the title Hot Country Albums, when the number one album was Ring of Fire: The Best of Johnny Cash by Johnny Cash.

The chart changed its name to Top Country LP's in the issue of Billboard dated January 13, 1968, Top Country LPs (with no apostrophe) in the issue dated May 31, 1980, and Top Country Albums in the issue dated October 20, 1984. The record for the highest number of weeks spent at number one by an album is held by Dangerous: The Double Album by Morgan Wallen, which spent a total of 97 non-consecutive weeks atop the chart.

== Methodology ==
From its launch until May 1991, the chart was compiled based on sales reports submitted by a representative sample of record stores nationwide. In 1991 the sales reports were replaced by electronic point of sale data. Since February 2017 the chart has been "based on multi-metric consumption (blending traditional album sales, track equivalent albums, and streaming equivalent albums)".

== Chart records ==
=== Albums with most weeks at number one ===
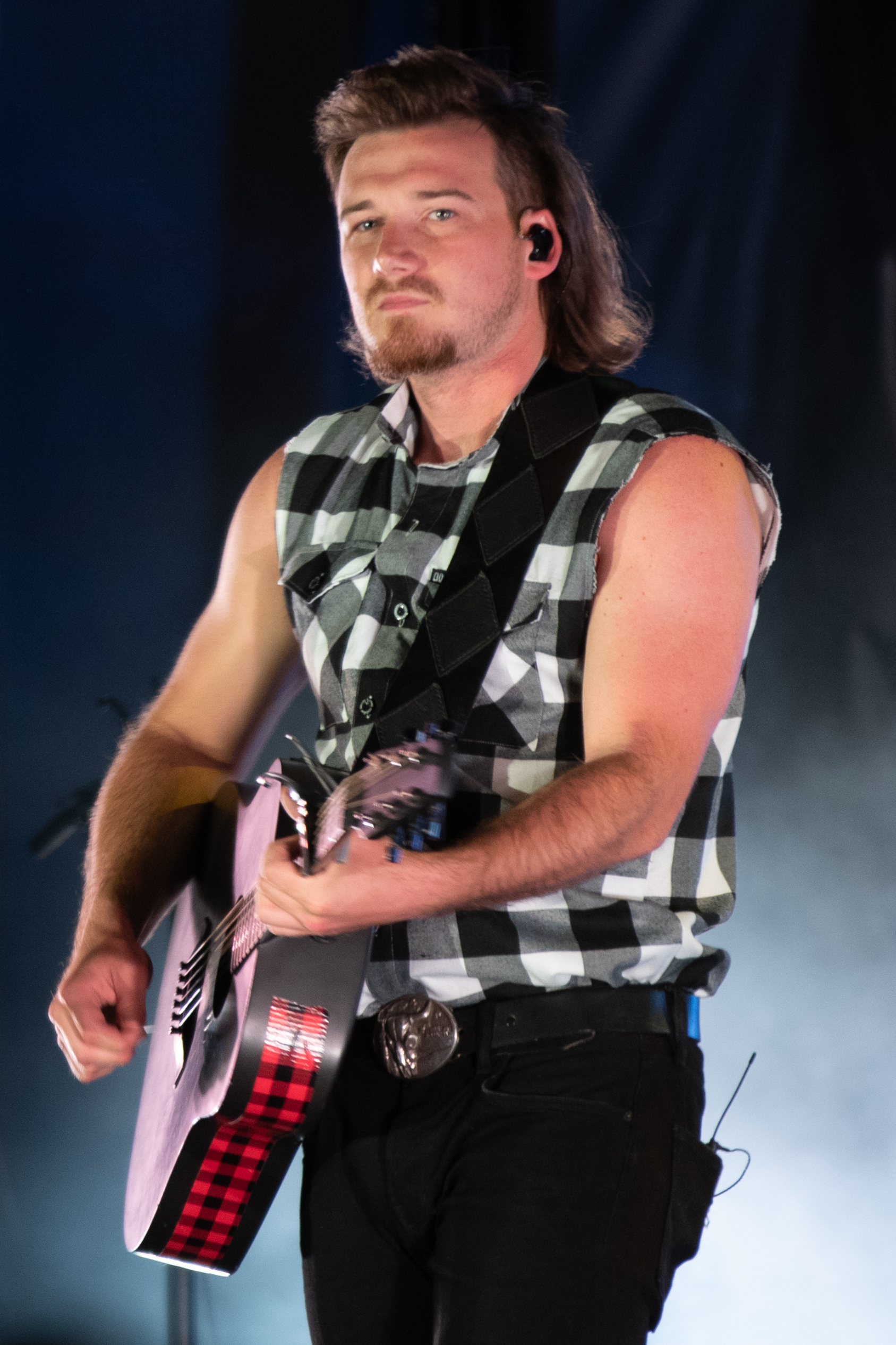
The three longest-running number ones on the chart are all albums by Morgan Wallen.

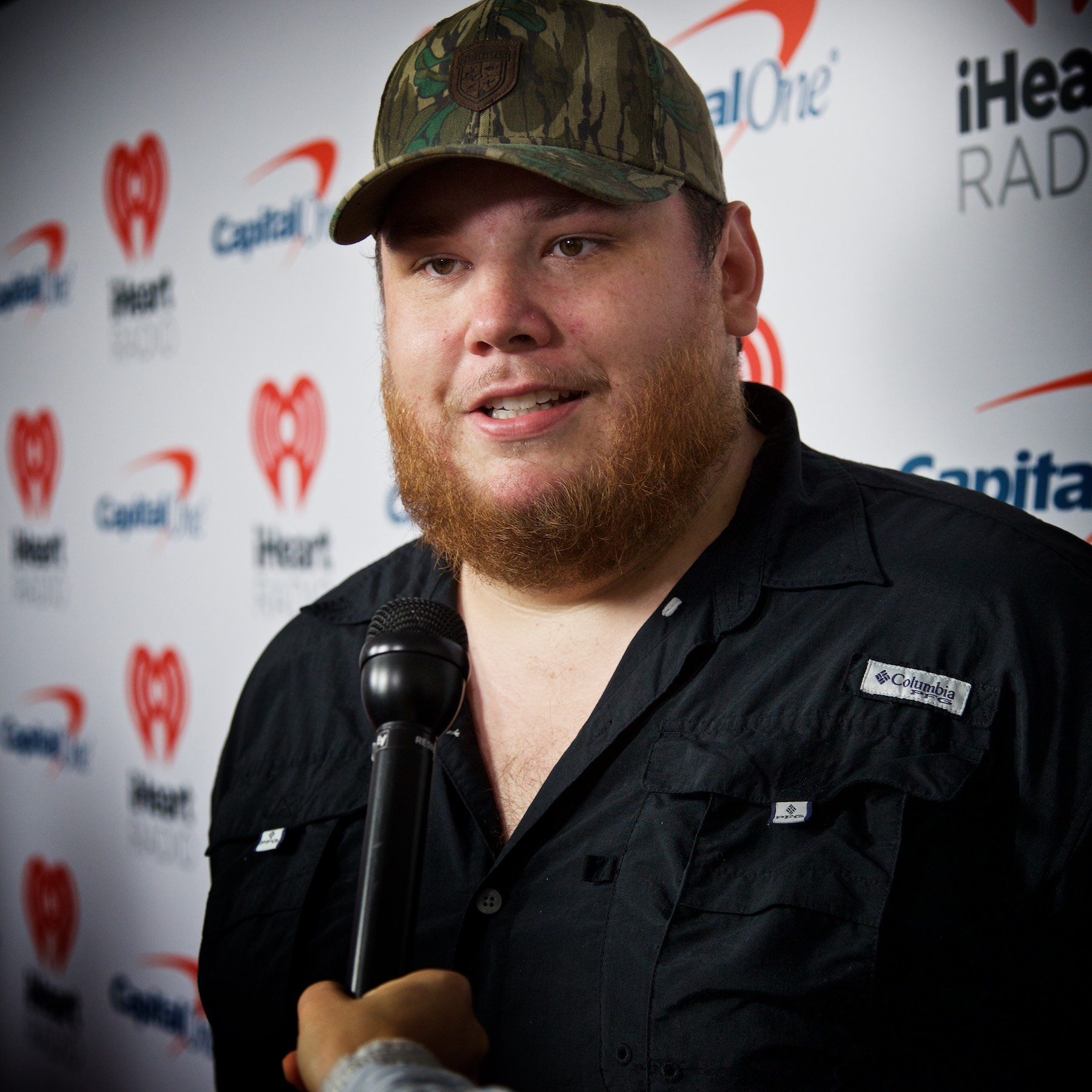
Luke Combs has had two albums spend over 30 weeks at number one.

The following albums have spent more than 30 weeks at number one, as of the chart dated November 21, 2026:

Weeks	First year at number one	Artist	Album	Ref.
97	2021	Morgan Wallen	Dangerous: The Double Album	
87	2023	Morgan Wallen	One Thing at a Time	
53	2025	Morgan Wallen	I'm the Problem	
50	1997	Shania Twain	Come On Over	
50	2017	Luke Combs	This One's for You	
43	1987	Randy Travis	Always & Forever	
41	1990	Garth Brooks	No Fences	
37	2019	Luke Combs	What You See Is What You Get	
36	1999	Dixie Chicks	Fly	
35	2000	Original soundtrack	O Brother, Where Art Thou?	
35	2008	Taylor Swift	Fearless	
34	1992	Billy Ray Cyrus	Some Gave All	
33	1991	Garth Brooks	Ropin' The Wind	
31	2010	Lady Antebellum	Need You Now	

The figure for "Fearless" by Taylor Swift does not include the weeks spent at number one by Fearless (Taylor's Version), her 2021 complete re-recording of the album. Dixie Chicks and Lady Antebellum subsequently changed their names to The Chicks and Lady A respectively.

=== Artist with most number ones ===
The following acts have had more than 15 number ones as of the chart dated November 21, 2026:

Number ones	First year at number one	Artist	Ref.
27	1984	George Strait	
18	1975	Willie Nelson	
17	1990	Garth Brooks	
17	2000	Kenny Chesney	
17	1994	Tim McGraw	
16	1966	Merle Haggard	

=== Artists with most cumulative weeks at number one ===
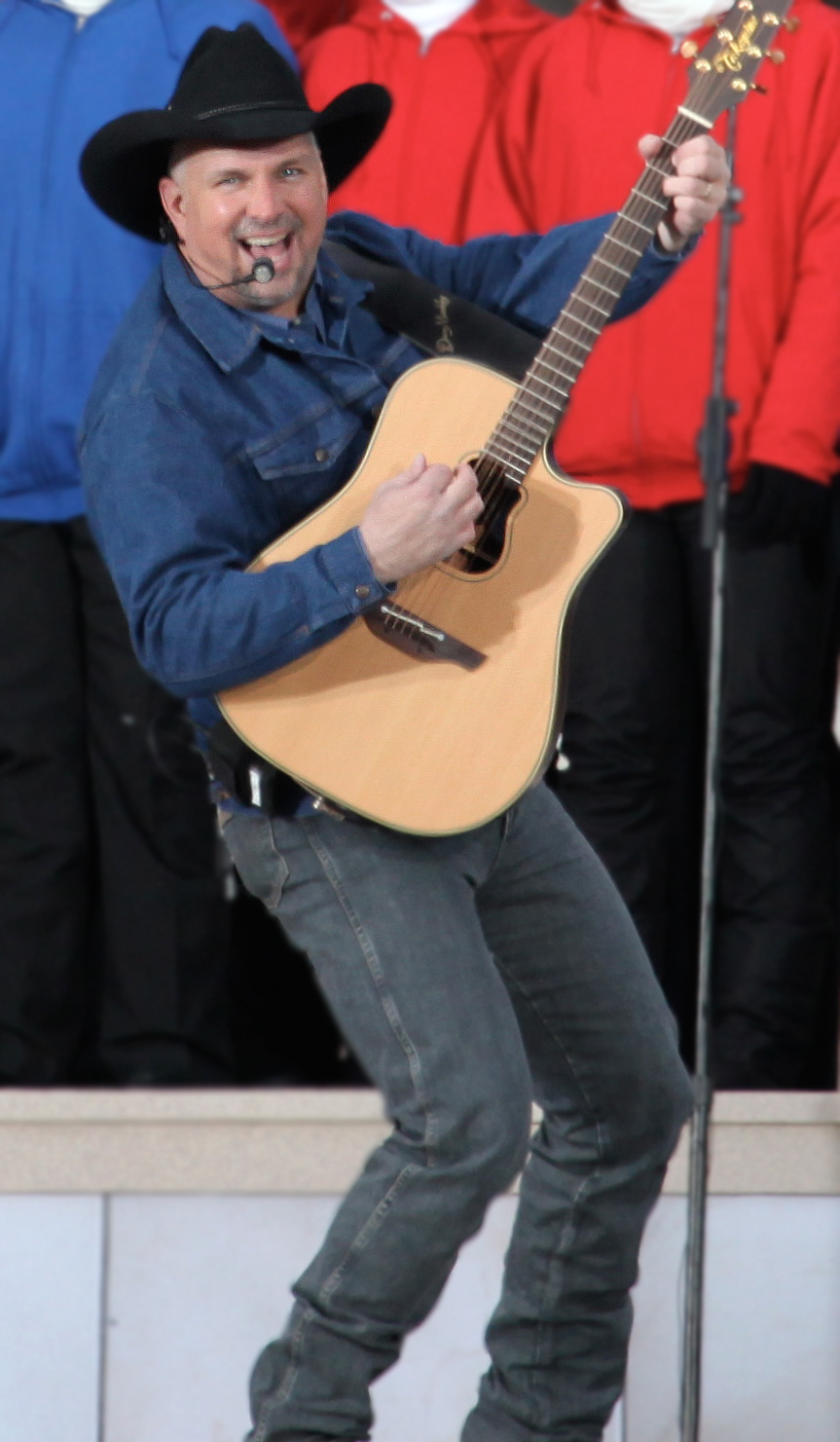
Garth Brooks has spent a total of more than three years at number one.

The followings acts have achieved at least 50 weeks at number one, as of the chart dated November 21, 2026.

Weeks at number one	Artist	Source
238	Morgan Wallen	
173	Garth Brooks	
125	Alabama	
101	Willie Nelson	
101	Taylor Swift	
99	Kenny Rogers	
97	Shania Twain	
89	Luke Combs	
85	Charley Pride	
80	Randy Travis	
76	Tim McGraw	
76	Waylon Jennings	
73	The Chicks	
61	George Strait	
60	Buck Owens	
57	Johnny Cash	
51	Glen Campbell	
51	Merle Haggard	
51	Eddy Arnold	
50	LeAnn Rimes	
50	Kenny Chesney	

The total for The Chicks consists of 71 weeks under the band's previous name, Dixie Chicks, and 2 under its new name.

=== Artists with most consecutive number one albums ===
The following artists have garnered the most consecutive number one albums on the Top Country Albums chart.

Artist	Consecutive number ones	Source
Kenny Chesney	12	
Carrie Underwood	9	
Garth Brooks	8	
Rascal Flatts	8	
Taylor Swift	8	
Miranda Lambert	7	

== See also ==
- List of Billboard number-one country albums
