= The Christmas Spirit =

Studio album by Johnny Cash
- Released: November 11, 1963
- Recorded: August 14, 1959–September 17, 1963
- Genres: Christmas; country
- Length: 38:20
- Label: Columbia
- Producers: Don Law; Frank Jones

Johnny Cash chronology
Ring of Fire: The Best of Johnny Cash (1963)	The Christmas Spirit (1963)	I Walk the Line (1964)

Singles from The Christmas Spirit
- 1. "The Little Drummer Boy" Released: October 1959

The Christmas Spirit is the first Christmas album and tenth album by country singer Johnny Cash, released on Columbia Records in November 1963. It contains four original Christmas songs written by Cash and eight tracks originally written by other artists, including "Blue Christmas" (at this point best known through the version recorded by Cash's former Sun Records labelmate Elvis Presley), "Silent Night" and "Little Drummer Boy".

Professional ratings
Review scores
Source	Rating
Allmusic	3.5/5 stars

== Track listing ==
Side one
No.	Title	Writer(s)	Length
1.	"The Christmas Spirit" (incorporates "O Little Town of Bethlehem")	Cash	5:03
2.	"I Heard the Bells on Christmas Day"	Henry Wadsworth Longfellow, Jean Baptiste Calkin	2:30
3.	"Blue Christmas"	Bill Hayes, Jay Johnston	2:25
4.	"The Gifts They Gave"	Cash	3:34
5.	"Here Was a Man"	Johnny Bond, Tex Ritter	2:44
6.	"Christmas as I Knew It"	Cash, June Carter, Jan Howard	3:41

Side two
No.	Title	Writer(s)	Length
7.	"Silent Night"	Franz Gruber, Josef Mohr	3:29
8.	"The Little Drummer Boy"	Katherine Davis, Henri Onerati, Harry Simeone	2:34
9.	"Ringing the Bells for Jim"	Carter, Howard	2:47
10.	"We Are the Shepherds"	Cash	3:13
11.	"Who Kept the Sheep"	Cash, Carter	1:58
12.	"Ballad of the Harp Weaver"	Edna St. Vincent Millay	4:22

== Personnel ==
- Johnny Cash - vocals, guitar
- Luther Perkins, Grady Martin, Jack Clement - guitar
- Marshall Grant - bass
- W.S. Holland, Buddy Harman - drums
- Hargus "Pig" Robbins, Bill Pursell - organ, piano
- Maybelle Carter - autoharp
- Anita Kerr - organ
- Bob Johnson - flute

== Charts ==
Album - Billboard (United States)

Year	Chart	Position
1963	Holiday Albums	7
