= Pick a Bale of Cotton =

American folk song

"Pick a Bale of Cotton" (Roud 10061, sometimes "Pick a Bale o' Cotton") is a traditional American folk song and work song recorded by Texas inmates James "Iron Head" Baker (1933) and Moses "Clear Rock" Platt (1939) and later popularized by Lead Belly (Huddie William Ledbetter). Johnny Cash, as well as others, have released adaptations of the song.

== Covers ==
The song has been covered by many artists including Harry Belafonte (under the name "Jump Down, Spin Around" on Belafonte, 1955), The Vipers Skiffle Group, The Quarrymen and Lonnie Donegan.

=== Johnny Cash ===
"Pick a Bale o' Cotton"

Single by Johnny Cash
- A-side: "Bonanza!"
- B-side: "Pick a Bale o' Cotton"
- Released: July 1962/August 1962
- Label: Columbia 4-42512
- Producers: Don Law and Frank Jones

Audio
- "Pick a Bale o' Cotton" on YouTube

Johnny Cash released an adaptation on a single for Columbia Records (Columbia 4-42512, with "Bonanza!" on the flip side. That version of the song appears in the Cash compilation album The Legend. It was released in July or August 1962.

=== Personnel ===
- Johnny Cash – vocal, guitar
- Joe Hancock – banjo
- Marshall Grant – bass
- W. S. Holland – drums
- Luther Perkins – electric guitar
- Bill Pursell – piano

=== Other adaptations ===
Allan Sherman performed a parody in the early 1960s which included the lyric, "Jump down, spin around, pick a dress of cotton / Jump down, spin around, pick a dress o' wool."

Sonny Terry and Brownie McGhee recorded it as a duo. Sonny Terry also recorded it with Woody Guthrie.

ABBA recorded it as a medley, the other tunes in the medley being "On Top of Old Smokey" and "Midnight Special". The track just titled "Medley" was recorded in 1975 and was the B-side to the 1978 vinyl single "Summer Night City". The medley also appeared as a track on the German charity album Im Zeichen eines guten Sterns on Polydor. The medley reappeared in the 1994 4-CD boxed set compilation Thank You for the Music and on the 2012 remastered ABBA as a bonus track.

Children's music artist Raffi recorded the song on his 1979 album, The Corner Grocery Store.

The song is sung by members of Navin Johnson (Steve Martin's) family under the opening and end credits of Martin's 1979 comedy The Jerk.

Dead Kennedys drummer D.H. Peligro recorded a version of this song under the name "Black Bean Chili Thing" on the 1995 self-titled album of his band Peligro.

Ludacris implemented the verse in his 2005 single "The Potion" as a breakdown before the third verse. He also references the verse in his feature on Missy Elliott's 2002 song "Gossip Folks" on the last line of his verse.

In 2014, Country and Irish singer Derek Ryan covered it in his 2014 album The Simple Things also releasing a music video.

At some point the tune was adapted to the Hebrew words of “Mishenichnas Adar” — “When Adar arrives” — which is based on a line from the Talmud (Ta’anit Portfolio 29a) that means “When Adar arrives, we increase our joy.” Adar is a Hebrew month — and home to the happy holiday of Purim.

== Changed perspective ==
The song, particularly its original lyrics, has been criticized as racist and reminiscent of—and glorifying—the slavery period in American history. The original lyrics contained the offensive, generally censored racial slur nigger multiple times. Covers of the song changed the offensive lyric.

=== Original lyrics ===
One of the verses, according to John Lomax's American Ballads and Folk Songs, includes:

Dat nigger from Shiloh
Kin pick a bale o' cotton
Dat nigger from Shiloh
Kin pick a bale a day

Later versions of the folk song had amended the lyrics to:

Gonna jump down, turn around
Pick a bale of cotton
Gonna jump down, turn around
Pick a bale a day
Oh lordy, pick a bale of cotton
Oh lordy, pick a bale a day

The song is sung with increasing speed as it progresses, with ensuing verses having references to "me and my wife" replaced with the likes of "me and my gal", "me and my papa", "me and my friend".
