= Songs of Our Soil =

Studio album by Johnny Cash
- Released: July 6, 1959
- Recorded: July 24, 1958–March 13, 1959
- Genre: Country
- Length: Original: 25:40; Re-issue: 29:34
- Label: Columbia
- Producer: Don Law; Al Quaglieri

Johnny Cash chronology
Hymns by Johnny Cash (1959)	Songs of Our Soil (1959)	Greatest! (1959)

Professional ratings
Review scores
Source	Rating
AllMusic	4/5 stars
The Rolling Stone Album Guide	3.5/5 stars

Songs of Our Soil is the fourth studio album by American singer Johnny Cash. It was originally released on July 6, 1959, and later re-issued on August 27, 2002 with two additional bonus tracks.

The major theme throughout this album is death. Death concludes "The Man on the Hill", "Hank and Joe and Me", "Clementine" and "My Grandfather's Clock." "Don't Step on Mother's Roses" is about a family losing their parents to death; first Mother, then Daddy. "The Great Speckled Bird" is a spiritual about the Second Coming of Jesus. "The Caretaker" is the story of a cemetery caretaker wondering who will mourn for him when his time comes. Even "Five Feet High and Rising" ("the hives are gone; I lost my bees") and "Old Apache Squaw" ("...the next white man that sees my face is gonna be a dead white man") mention death in some way. "I Want to Go Home" is a retitled version of the nautical standard "The John B. Sails".

By his own admission, Cash was becoming fascinated by death during this time, in part due to his growing amphetamine and barbiturate dependence, and also due to the premature death of his brother.

== Track listing ==
Side one
No.	Title	Writer(s)	Recording date	Length
1.	"Drink to Me"	Johnny Cash	July 24, 1958	1:54
2.	"Five Feet High and Rising"	Cash	March 12, 1959	1:46
3.	"The Man on the Hill"	Cash	March 12, 1959	2:09
4.	"Hank and Joe and Me"	Cash	March 12, 1959	2:13
5.	"Clementine"	Billy Mize, Buddy Mize	March 12, 1959	2:30
6.	"The Great Speckled Bird"	Traditional	March 13, 1959	2:09

Side two
No.	Title	Writer(s)	Recording date	Length
7.	"I Want to Go Home"	Traditional	March 13, 1959	1:58
8.	"The Caretaker"	Cash	March 13, 1959	2:06
9.	"Old Apache Squaw"	Cash	March 13, 1959	1:46
10.	"Don't Step On Mother's Roses"	Cash	March 13, 1959	2:34
11.	"My Grandfather's Clock"	Henry Clay Work	March 13, 1959	2:45
12.	"It Could Be You (Instead of Him)"	Vic McAlpin	January 23, 1959	1:50

Bonus tracks
No.	Title	Writer(s)	Recording date	Length
13.	"I Got Stripes"	Cash, Charlie Williams	March 12, 1959	2:05
14.	"You Dreamer You"	Cash	March 12, 1959	1:49
Total length:				29:34

== Personnel ==
- Johnny Cash - vocals, rhythm guitar
- Luther Perkins - lead guitar
- Marshall Grant - bass
- Marvin Hughes - piano
- Buddy Harman - drums
- The Jordanaires - backing vocals

Additional personnel

- Don Law - Original Recording Producer
- Al Quaglieri - Reissue Producer
- Seth Foster - Engineer
- Mark Wilder - Mastering, Mixing
- Billy Altman - Liner Notes
- Don Hunstein - Photography
- Steven Berkowitz - A&R
- Howard Fritzson - Art Direction
- Randall Martin - Design
- John Christiana - Packaging Manager

== Charts ==
Singles - Billboard (United States)

Year	Single	Chart	Position
1959	"Five Feet High and Rising"	Country Singles	14
1959	"Five Feet High and Rising"	Pop Singles	76
