= The Big Battle =

Single by Johnny Cash

from the album Ring of Fire: The Best of Johnny Cash
- A-side: "The Big Battle" "When I've Learned"
- Released: 1962
- Genre: country
- Label: Columbia 4-42301
- Songwriter: Johnny Cash

Music video
- "The Big Battle" (audio only) on YouTube

"The Big Battle" is a song written and originally recorded by Johnny Cash.

The song was released as a single by Columbia Records (Columbia 4-42301, with "When I've Learned" on the opposite side) in January, February, or March 1962. The song was later used on the concept album America: A 200-Year Salute in Story and Song.

== Composition ==
Cash also voiced his personal views regarding the Civil War. He reached number 24 on the country chart in 1962 with "The Big Battle," an intriguing story-song set against the backdrop of the Civil War. It tells of the aftermath of the battle when all that's left are the dead and the dying with the "blue lying alongside the gray." It's a harsh recounting of the tragic toll that war takes on everyone on either side. There's an ominous feel to the song, as Cash successfully paints a devastating portrait of the high cost of war. This is one of Cash's most thought-out and fully developed compositions. The song drives home the message that the repercussions of war never cease and the battle goes on long after the fighting is over.

— John M. Alexander. The Man in Song: A Discographic Biography of Johnny Cash

== Charts ==
Chart (1962)	Peak position
US Hot Country Songs (Billboard)	24
