= Forty Shades of Green =

Single by Johnny Cash

from the album Ring of Fire: The Best of Johnny Cash
- A-side: "The Rebel - Johnny Yuma"
- Released: April 1961
- Genre: Folk
- Length: 2:54
- Label: Columbia
- Songwriter: Johnny Cash
- Producers: Don Law, Frank Jones

"Forty Shades of Green" is a song about Ireland, written and first performed by American country singer Johnny Cash. Cash wrote the song in 1959 while on a trip to Ireland; it was first released as a B-side of the song "The Rebel–Johnny Yuma" in 1961. It is also included in two of Cash's albums: Ring of Fire: The Best of Johnny Cash, released on Columbia Records in 1963, and Johnny Cash: The Great Lost Performance – Live at the Paramount Theatre, Asbury Park, New Jersey, recorded live in 1990 and released in 2007.

Cash once recalled performing the song in Ireland and being told by an old man afterwards, that it must have been an old Irish folk tune.

"Forty Shades of Green" has also been recorded by Dexys Midnight Runners, Daniel O'Donnell, Foster and Allen, Roger Whittaker and Ruby Murray, among others.

Irish guitarist Gary Moore quoted the song in the title track of his 1987 album, Wild Frontier, as a reference to a once innocent Ireland "before the wars began": "The victims you have seen. You'll never hear them sing again The Forty Shades Of Green".
