= Five Feet High and Rising =

Compilation album by Johnny Cash
- Released: 1974
- Genre: Country; folk
- Label: Columbia

Johnny Cash chronology
The Junkie and the Juicehead Minus Me (1974)	Five Feet High and Rising (1974)	The Johnny Cash Children's Album (1975)

Five Feet High and Rising is a compilation album of songs performed by country singer Johnny Cash, released in 1974 on Columbia Records.

The album is made of songs from the 1960s up to the album The Junkie and the Juicehead Minus Me. It rose to number 33 on the Billboard Country Albums chart.

Professional ratings
Review scores
Source	Rating
Allmusic	2/5 stars

== Track listing ==
No.	Title	Writer(s)	Length
1.	"In Them Old Cottonfields Back Home"	Lead Belly	2:33
2.	"I'm So Lonesome I Could Cry"	Hank Williams	2:38
3.	"Frankie's Man Johnny"	Johnny Cash	2:17
4.	"In the Jailhouse Now"	Jimmie Rodgers	2:22
5.	"My Shoes Keep Walking Back to You"	Lee Ross, Bob Wills	2:23
6.	"Don't Take Your Guns to Town"	Cash	3:04
7.	"Great Speckled Bird"	Roy Carter, Guy Smith	2:04
8.	"Five Feet High and Rising"	Cash	1:49
9.	"I Forgot More Than You'll Ever Know"	Cecil A. Null	2:29

== Charts ==
Album – Billboard (United States)

Year	Chart	Position
1974	Country Albums	33
