= Long-Legged Guitar Pickin' Man =

Song by Johnny Cash and June Carter

Single by Johnny Cash and June Carter

from the album Carryin' On with Johnny Cash & June Carter
- B-side: "You'll Be All Right"
- Released: May 1967
- Genre: Rockabilly, rock and roll, country
- Length: 2:36
- Label: Columbia 4-44158
- Songwriter: Carl Perkins (rights given to Marshall Grant)

Johnny Cash singles chronology
"Jackson" (1967)	"Long-Legged Guitar Pickin' Man" (1967)	"Red Velvet" (1967)

"Long-Legged Guitar Pickin' Man" is a song written by Carl Perkins and credited to Cash's bass player Marshall Grant. It was originally recorded as a duet by Johnny Cash & June Carter Cash in 1967 and appeared on their all duet album titled Carryin' On with Johnny Cash & June Carter

Released in May 1967 as a single (Columbia 4-44158, with "You'll Be All Right" on the opposite side), the track was also included on the album Carryin' On with Johnny Cash & June Carter, released in August of that same year.

The song peaked at number six on U.S. Billboard's country chart for the week of August 19, 1967.

== Track listing ==
7" single (Columbia 4-44158, 1967)
No.	Title	Writer(s)	Length
1.	"Long-Legged Guitar Pickin' Man"	Carl Perkins (rights given to Marshall Grant)	2:32
2.	"You'll Be All Right"	J. Cash, J. Carter	2:44

7" single (Columbia [Hall of Fame series] 4-33120, 1968)
No.	Title	Writer(s)	Length
1.	"Jackson"	G. Rodgers, B. Wheeler	2:45
2.	"Long-Legged Guitar Pickin' Man"	Carl Perkins (rights given to Marshall Grant)	2:32

== Charts ==
Chart (1967)	Peak position
US Hot Country Songs (Billboard)	6
