= Jakob Rosenberg =

German-American art historian

- Born: September 5, 1893; Berlin (German Empire)
- Died: April 7, 1980 (aged 86); Cambridge, Massachusetts (United States)
- Occupations: Art curator, historian, and educator
- Relatives: Saemy Rosenberg, Erich Rosenberg

Academic background
- Education: Ludwig-Maximilians-Universität München
- Doctoral advisor: Heinrich Wölfflin

Jakob Rosenberg (September 5, 1893 – April 7, 1980) was an art historian, museum curator, and educator who is noted particularly for published work on Rembrandt. He was active in Germany until his 1937 emigration to the United States, where he joined the faculty of Harvard University. In addition to his professorship he was the curator of prints at the Fogg Museum. Rosenberg retired in 1964, but continued his scholarly activities until his 1980 death in Cambridge, Massachusetts.

Rosenberg was born in Berlin into a family of art dealers. His brother Saemy Rosenberg (1893–1971) continued the business in Germany, the Netherlands, and the United States. During the years 1912 to 1914 he first did an internship in the art trade in Munich. After serving in a cavalry unit in World War I he was wounded, captured by the British and sent to Scotland. In 1915 and was sent to Switzerland by prisoner exchange. After the war he studied art history at the University of Bern and the University of Zurich, then at the University of Frankfurt am Main and the Ludwig-Maximilians-Universität München, where he received his doctorate under Heinrich Wölfflin. He then worked for Max J. Friedlander in the Berlin print cabinet Kupferstichkabinett Berlin, where he also had contact with Wilhelm von Bode. In 1932, Friedländer and Rosenberg published their book on the paintings of Lucas Cranach the Elder (Die Gemälde von Lucas Cranach der Äe.). In 1935, he became a curator at the Kupferstickkabinett. Rosenberg was of Jewish descent, and resigned from his position in the same year. Many Jews were being dismissed from positions at the time in accordance with the Nuremberg Laws of the National Socialist regime in Germany. His colleague Friedländer had retired in 1933 for similar reasons. Their work on Lucas Cranach was interrupted, and their second book on Cranach's drawings was only published in 1960, two years after Friedländer's death in the Netherlands.

After a visit to Harvard University in 1936, Jakob Rosenberg immigrated to the United States in 1937 and became a research fellow and at Harvard on the recommendations from Adolph Goldschmidt and his friend Paul Sachs. In 1940, he was appointed as an associate professor and in 1947 as a full professor. His 1948 overview work on Rembrandt was reprinted in 1964 and 1968, holding its own as a standard work during the early years of the Rembrandt Research Project. He was also director of the Graphic Collection of the Museum of Fine Arts, Boston from 1939, and was appointed as Curator of Prints at the Fogg Museum in 1939.

In 1954, he was elected to the American Academy of Arts and Sciences.

Jakob Rosenberg married Elisabeth Husserl (1882–1981), daughter of Edmund Husserl, in 1922. He was survived by his wife and by two children, Wolfgang Rosenberg and Ruth Medalia.

== Publications ==
- Die Handzeichnungen von Martin Schongauer. München 1923 (Dissertation).
- Jacob van Ruisdael. Berlin: Cassirer. 1928. OCLC 2575900.
- with Max J. Friedländer, Elfried Bock: Die Zeichnungen alter Meister im Kupfertichkabinett. Staatliche Museen zu Berlin. Die Niederländischen Meister (in German). Frankfurt a. M. 1931. OCLC 163059727.
- with Max J. Friedländer: Die Gemälde von Lucas Cranach [The Paintings of Lucas Cranach] (in German). Berlin: Deutscher Verein für Kunstwissenschaft. 1932. OCLC 560279610.
- Rembrandt. Life and Work. Cambridge, Mass: Harvard University. 1948. OCLC 256187792.
- Great Draughtsmen from Pisanello to Picasso. Cambridge, Mass.: Harvard University Press. 1959. OCLC 502238231.
- Die Zeichnungen Lucas Cranach d. Ä [The Drawings of Lucas Cranach the Elder] (in German). Berlin: Deutscher Verein für Kunstwissenschaft. 1960. OCLC 1086643224.
- with Seymour Slive and Engelbert H. ter Kuile: Dutch Art and Architecture, 1600 to 1800. Baltimore: Penguin Books. 1966. OCLC 518654.
- On Quality in Art: Criteria of Excellence, Past and Present (Bollingen series 35). Princeton University Press. 1969. OCLC 517408.
- Great Draughtsmen from Pisanello to Picasso (revised ed.). Harper & Row. 1974. ISBN 9780064300292. OCLC 1134345.
- with Max J. Friedländer: The Paintings of Lucas Cranach. Translated by Norden, Heinz; Taylor, Ronald (revised ed.). Ithaca: Cornell University Press. 1978. ISBN 9783764309824. OCLC 6821392.
- with Max J. Friedländer: Les peintures de Lucas Cranach (in French) (revised ed.). Paris: Flammarion. 1978. OCLC 13443953.
- with Max J. Friedländer: Die Gemälde von Lucas Cranach (in German) (revised ed.). Bern: Birkhäuser. 1979. ISBN 9783764309824. OCLC 6821392.
- Rembrandt: Life and Work (revised ed.). Ithaca: Cornell University Press. 1980. ISBN 9780801491986. OCLC 7174927.
