= Livingston & Evans =

Livingston and Evans were the songwriting and composing team of Jay Livingston (1915–2001) and Ray Evans (1915–2007), who worked on movies, television and stage.

They met while attending the University of Pennsylvania in Philadelphia. They played together in bands. In either 1937 or 1938, the pair moved to New York City to begin their songwriting careers. They wrote the 1940 hit song "Goodbye Now" for the 1938 Broadway musical revue Hellzapoppin, but years went by without further success.

In 1944, they moved to Hollywood at the encouragement of Johnny Mercer to work in films. The following year, they were signed by Paramount Pictures. In 1946, five versions of their "To Each His Own" (performed by Eddy Howard, Tony Martin, Freddy Martin & His Orchestra, The Modernaires and The Ink Spots) were in the Top Ten on the Billboard charts simultaneously, with three eventually peaking at number one.

Some of their best known songs are:

- the Christmas song "Silver Bells"
- "Buttons and Bows"
- "Mona Lisa"
- "Que Sera, Sera"
- "Tammy"

They also wrote the theme music for the television shows Bonanza and Mister Ed, with Livingston singing the lyrics for the latter: "A horse is a horse, of course, of course ...".

They received three Academy Awards for Best Song - for "Buttons and Bows" in The Paleface (1948), "Mona Lisa" in Captain Carey, U.S.A. (1950) and "Que Sera Sera" in The Man Who Knew Too Much (1956) - and a total of seven nominations. The duo appeared as themselves in the 1950 film Sunset Boulevard. They have a star together on the Hollywood Walk of Fame.
