= Happy to Be with You =

Single by Johnny Cash

from the album Happiness Is You
- A-side: "Happy to Be with You" "Pickin' Time"
- Released: 1965
- Genre: Country
- Label: Columbia 4-43420
- Songwriters: June Carter, Johnny Cash, Merle Kilgore
- Producers: Don Law and Frank Jones

Audio
- "Happy to Be with You" on YouTube

"Happy to Be with You" is a song co-written by Johnny Cash with June Carter and Merle Kilgore.

Released in October 1965 as a single (Columbia 4-43420, with "Pickin' Time" on the opposite side), it entered the country charts in November, eventually reaching #9 on the U.S. Billboard country chart and #11 on the Cash Box country chart.

Later the song was included on the album Happiness Is You (October 1966).

== Background and lyrical analysis ==
Merle Kilgore and June Carter reteam with Johnny for “Happy to Be with You,” a positive affirmation of the joys of being in love. Once again, one can't help but read into it the personal nature of Johnny and June's situation at the time, and the fact that they were truly enjoying each other's company. This was the only single released from the Happiness Is You album, and it reached number 9 on the country chart.

— John M. Alexander. The Man in Song: A Discographic Biography of Johnny Cash

In the midst of the chaos surrounding [Cash's] arrest [for trespassing onto private property to pick flowers], Columbia released a new single to close out the year. Co-written by Cash, June Carter, and Merle Kilgore, "Happy to Be with You," with its swirling '60s pop organ carrying most of the musical weight, had a sound unlike any Cash single to date. Even so, fans responded positively, and the song started a slow climb up the charts, starting 1966 at its peak of #9.

— C. Eric Banister. Johnny Cash FAQ: All That's Left to Know About the Man in Black

== Track listing ==
7" single (Columbia 4-43420, 1965)
No.	Title	Writer(s)	Length
1.	"Happy to Be with You"	J. Carter, J. Cash, M. Kilgore	3:11
2.	"Pickin' Time"	J. Cash	1:58

== Charts ==
Chart (1965–1966)	Peak position
US Hot Country Songs (Billboard)	15
