= Second Honeymoon (song) =

Single by Johnny Cash
- A-side: "Second Honeymoon" "Honky-Tonk Girl"
- Released: 1960
- Genre: country
- Label: Columbia 4-41707
- Songwriter: Autry Inman

Johnny Cash singles chronology
"Smiling Bill McCall" (1960)	"Second Honeymoon" (1960)	"Down the Street to 301" (1960)

Music video
- "Second Honeymoon" (audio only) on YouTube

"Second Honeymoon" is a song originally recorded by Johnny Cash. It was written for him by Autry Inman.

The song was released as a single by Columbia Records (Columbia 4-41707, with "Honky-Tonk Girl" on the opposite side) in June or July 1960.

== Charts ==
Chart (1960)	Peak position
US Billboard Hot 100	79
US Hot Country Songs (Billboard)	15
