= I Walk the Line (1964 album) =

Studio album by Johnny Cash
- Released: June 22, 1964
- Recorded: June 13, 1963–March 5, 1964
- Genre: Country; rockabilly
- Label: Columbia
- Producer: Don Law; Frank Jones

Johnny Cash chronology
The Christmas Spirit (1963)	I Walk the Line (1964)	Bitter Tears: Ballads of the American Indian (1964)

Singles from I Walk the Line
- 1. "Understand Your Man" Released: February 22, 1964; 2. "Bad News" Released: June 2, 1964

Professional ratings
Review scores
Source	Rating
AllMusic	4.5/5 stars
Record Mirror	5/5 stars

I Walk the Line is the eleventh studio album by singer and songwriter Johnny Cash, featuring a handful of recent songs alongside new recordings of previous hits from his previous tenure at Sun Records (save for "I Still Miss Someone," which was first recorded for Columbia). It was released on Columbia Records in 1964. The album was certified Gold by the RIAA in 1967.

== Track listing ==
Side one
No.	Title	Writer(s)	Length
1.	"I Walk the Line" (new recording)	Cash	2:33
2.	"Bad News"	John D. Loudermilk	2:56
3.	"Folsom Prison Blues" (new recording)	Cash	2:35
4.	"Give My Love to Rose" (new recording)	Cash	2:20
5.	"Hey Porter" (new recording)	Cash	2:19
6.	"I Still Miss Someone" (new recording)	Johnny Cash, Roy Cash	3:07

Side two
No.	Title	Writer(s)	Length
7.	"Understand Your Man"	Cash	2:43
8.	"Wreck of the Old '97" (new recording)	Cash, Bob Johnson, Norman Blake	2:41
9.	"Still in Town"	Harlan Howard, Hank Cochran	2:36
10.	"Big River" (new recording)	Cash	2:17
11.	"Goodbye Little Darlin' Goodbye" (new recording)	Gene Autry, Johnny Marvin	2:24
12.	"Troublesome Waters"	Maybelle Carter, Dixie Dean	3:48

== Personnel ==
- Johnny Cash – vocals, guitar
- Luther Perkins – lead guitar
- Norman Blake – acoustic guitar, dobro
- Bob Johnson, Jack Clement – rhythm guitar
- Marshall Grant – bass
- W.S. Holland – drums
- Bill Pursell – piano
- Don Helms – steel guitar
- Karl Garvin, Bill McElhiney – trumpet
- Rufus Long – flute
- The Carter Family – backing vocals

Additional personnel

- Produced by Don Law and Frank Jones
- Cover photo by Lee Friedlander

== Charts ==
Chart (1964)	Peak position
US Billboard 200	53
US Top Country Albums (Billboard)	1

Singles

Year	Single	Chart	Position
1964	"Understand Your Man"	US Billboard Hot 100	35
1964	"Understand Your Man"	US Hot Country Songs (Billboard)	1
1964	"Bad News"	US Hot Country Songs (Billboard)	8

== Certifications ==
Region	Certification	Certified units/sales
United States (RIAA)	Gold	500,000^{^}
^{^} Shipments figures based on certification alone.
