= When I've Learned =

Single by Bobby Lord
- A-side: "When I've Learned" "Walking Alone"
- Released: 1958
- Genre: country
- Label: Columbia 4-41288
- Songwriters: Buddy Killen, Ray Baker, Delbert Wilson

"When I've Learned"

Single by Johnny Cash

from the album Hymns from the Heart
- A-side: "The Big Battle" "When I've Learned"
- Released: 1962
- Genre: country
- Label: Columbia 4-42301
- Songwriters: Buddy Killen, Ray Baker, Delbert Wilson

Music video
- "When I've Learned" (audio only) on YouTube

Bobby Lord
"When I've Learned" / "Walking Alone"
Review scores
Source	Rating
Billboard	(positive)

"When I've Learned" (also known as "When I've Learned (Enough to Die)") is a song written by Buddy Killen, Ray Baker and Delbert Wilson. and released in 1958 as a single (Columbia 4-41288) by Bobby Lord.

Later, the song was notably recorded by Johnny Cash.

Cash's version was released as a single by Columbia Records (Columbia 4-42301, with "The Big Battle" on the opposite side) in January, February, or March 1962.

== Composition ==
John M. Alexander in his book The Man in Song: A Discographic Biography of Johnny Cash calls the songs "one of Johnny's best performances on the album ["Hymns from the Heart"], and one of his finest gospel recordings."

It's the testament of a good man who has seen heaven on earth by being a hard worker and living a good life. But the singer knows the fruits of this world are temporal, reasoning, “When I've learned enough to really live I'll be old enough to die.” If ever the adage “youth is wasted on the young” holds true, it's here. The singer has grown “to kind of like this life,” knowing the real payoff for his good works will be in the afterlife. This profound revelation coming from the young Johnny Cash attests to the fact that he always displayed wisdom far beyond his years.
