= The Rebel – Johnny Yuma =

Single by Johnny Cash

from the album Ring of Fire: The Best of Johnny Cash
- B-side: "Forty Shades of Green"
- Released: April 1961
- Genre: Country
- Length: 1:52
- Label: Columbia 4-41995
- Composer: Richard Markowitz
- Lyricist: Andrew Fenady

Audio
- "The Rebel – Johnny Yuma" on YouTube

"The Rebel – Johnny Yuma" is the theme song for the ABC-TV series The Rebel. It was written by Richard Markowitz (music) and Andrew J. Fenady (lyrics) and recorded by Johnny Cash.

The song was released as a single by Columbia Records (Columbia 4-41995, with "Forty Shades of Green" on the opposite side) in April 1961.

== Background ==
In 1959 Cash [...] recorded "The Rebel – Johnny Yuma," written by Richard Markowitz and Andrew J. Fenady. Cash was asked to perform the theme song to the TV western The Rebel, which starred Nick Adams and ran from 1959 to 1961. The theme of the series must have appealed to Cash. It was the tale of a young Confederate soldier who is left to wander aimlessly throughout the West two years after the Civil War had ended. The song perfectly captures the loneliness the soldier experiences as he wanders alone through a lawless land. And although Cash did not write it, you would never know it. The song made it to number 24 on the country chart in 1961, shortly before the series was canceled. It was originally released as the title song of [the four-song 1959 EP] Johnny Cash Sings the Rebel – Johnny Yuma.

— John M. Alexander. The Man in Song: A Discographic Biography of Johnny Cash

== Reception ==
The song is listed as one of "Classic Non-Hot 100 Songs" in Joel Whitburn's book Joel Whitburn's Top Pop Singles 1955–2006.

== Charts ==
Chart (1961)	Peak position
US Hot Country Songs (Billboard)	24
