= Happiness Is You =

Studio album by Johnny Cash
- Released: October 10, 1966
- Recorded: June 7, 1962–December 1, 1965
- Genres: Country; folk
- Length: 31:07
- Label: Columbia
- Producers: Don Law; Frank Jones

Johnny Cash chronology
Everybody Loves a Nut (1966)	Happiness Is You (1966)	Greatest Hits, Vol. 1 (1967)

Singles from Happiness Is You
- 1. "Happy to Be with You" Released: October 11, 1965

Professional ratings
Review scores
Source	Rating
Allmusic	2.5/5 stars

Happiness Is You is the twenty-fourth album by country singer Johnny Cash, released on Columbia Records in 1966 (see 1966 in music). It contains, among others, "Guess Things Happen That Way", a re-recording of one of Cash's earliest Sun recordings. The album reached #10 on the Country charts. The album's original title was to be "That's What You Get For Lovin' Me", from the Gordon Lightfoot tune included on the album. Promo copies and some early commercial pressings show this title on the label.

The album was never released on cassette and was not reissued on compact disc until 2012, as part of the boxed set Johnny Cash: The Complete Columbia Album Collection.

== Track listing ==
No.	Title	Writer(s)	Length
1.	"Happiness Is You"	Cash, June Carter Cash	2:59
2.	"Guess Things Happen That Way"	Jack Clement	1:55
3.	"Ancient History"	Wayne P. Walker, Irene Stanton	2:23
4.	"You Comb Her Hair"	Harlan Howard, Hank Cochran	2:42
5.	"She Came from the Mountains"	Peter La Farge	4:59
6.	"For Lovin' Me"	Gordon Lightfoot	2:40
7.	"No One Will Ever Know"	Fred Rose, Mel Foree	2:26
8.	"Is This My Destiny"	Helen Carter	2:31
9.	"A Wound Time Can't Erase"	Bill D. Johnson	2:37
10.	"Happy to Be with You"	Merle Kilgore, J. Carter, Cash	3:14
11.	"Wabash Cannonball"	A.P. Carter	2:41
Total length:			31:07

== Personnel ==
- Johnny Cash - vocals, guitar
- Luther Perkins - guitar
- Norman Blake - guitar, dobro
- Bob Johnson - guitar, flute
- Marshall Grant - bass
- W.S. Holland - drums
- Bill Pursell - piano
- Maybelle Carter - autoharp
- The Carter Family, The Statler Brothers - backing vocals

== Charts ==
Album - Billboard (United States)

Year	Chart	Position
1966	Country Albums	10
