= You Dreamer You =

Single by Johnny Cash
- A-side: "You Dreamer You" "Frankie's Man, Johnny"
- Released: 1959
- Genre: country
- Label: Columbia 4-41371
- Songwriter: Johnny Cash

Music video
- "You Dreamer You" on YouTube

"You Dreamer You" (also known as "Oh, What a Dream") is a song written and originally recorded by Johnny Cash.

The song was recorded by Cash on March 12, 1959" and released as his third Columbia single (Columbia 4-41371, with "Frankie's Man, Johnny" on the opposite side) in April 1959.

"You Dreamer You" made it to number 13 on the Billboard country chart, while "Frankie's Man, Johnny" reached number 9 on the country chart and number 57 on the Hot 100.

== Charts ==
| Chart (1959) | Peak position |
|---|---|
| US Hot Country Songs (Billboard) | 13 |
