= Ring of Fire: The Best of Johnny Cash =

Compilation album by Johnny Cash
- Released: July 8, 1963
- Recorded: July 24, 1958–March 25, 1963
- Genre: Country; gospel; rockabilly
- Length: 33:36
- Label: Columbia
- Producer: Don Law; Frank Jones

Johnny Cash chronology
Blood, Sweat and Tears (1963)	Ring of Fire: The Best of Johnny Cash (1963)	The Christmas Spirit (1963)

Singles from Ring of Fire: The Best of Jonny Cash
- 1. "What Do I Care" Released: September 15, 1958; 2. "The Rebel – Johnny Yuma" Released: April 3, 1961; 3. "Tennessee Flat Top Box" Released: October 6, 1961; 4. "The Big Battle" Released: February 2, 1962; 5. "Bonanza!" Released: July 20, 1962; 6. "(There'll Be) Peace in the Valley (for Me)" Released: November 2, 1962; 7. "Ring of Fire" Released: April 19, 1963

Professional ratings
Review scores
Source	Rating
AllMusic	link
The Rolling Stone Album Guide	3/5 stars

Ring of Fire: The Best of Johnny Cash is the sixteenth album by singer-songwriter Johnny Cash, released on Columbia Records in 1963 (see 1963 in music). This album collects tracks from singles and an EP released between 1959 and 1963, Cash's first years on the Columbia label, and marked the first release of these tracks in LP format, with the exception of "I Still Miss Someone," which had previously appeared on the 1958 album The Fabulous Johnny Cash. "Ring of Fire", one of Cash's most famous tracks, made its first LP appearance here. Ring of Fire was the first No. 1 album when Billboard debuted their Country Album Chart on January 11, 1964. Certified Gold on February 11, 1965 by the RIAA, it earned him his first Gold LP. It stands as the only Columbia "greatest hits" collection to be included in the Johnny Cash: The Complete Columbia Album Collection box set.

== Track listing ==
Side one
No.	Title	Writer(s)	Original release	Length
1.	"Ring of Fire"	June Carter, Merle Kilgore	Single A-side (Apr. 1963)	2:38
2.	"I'd Still Be There"	Johnny Cash, Johnny Horton	"Ring of Fire" B-side (Apr. 1963)	2:34
3.	"What Do I Care"	Cash	"All Over Again" B-side (Sep. 1958)	2:07
4.	"I Still Miss Someone"	Cash, Roy Cash	"Don't Take Your Guns to Town" B-side (Dec. 1958)	2:35
5.	"Forty Shades of Green"	Cash	"The Rebel – Johnny Yuma" B-side (Apr. 1961)	2:54
6.	"Were You There When They Crucified My Lord"	Traditional, The Carter Family	"Peace in the Valley" B-side (Oct. 1962)	3:56

Side two
No.	Title	Writer(s)	Original release	Length
1.	"The Rebel – Johnny Yuma"	Richard Markowitz, Andrew Fenady	Johnny Cash Sings "The Rebel – Johnny Yuma" - EP (Oct. 1959)	1:52
2.	"Bonanza"	Jay Livingston, Ray Evans	Single A-side (Aug. 1962)	2:20
3.	"The Big Battle"	Cash	Single A-side (Feb. 1962)	4:03
4.	"Remember the Alamo"	Jane Bowers	Johnny Cash Sings "The Rebel – Johnny Yuma" - EP (Oct. 1959)	2:50
5.	"Tennessee Flat Top Box"	Cash	Single A-side (Sep. 1961)	3:00
6.	"Peace in the Valley"	Thomas A. Dorsey	Single A-side (Oct. 1962)	2:47

== Personnel ==
- Johnny Cash - vocals, guitar
- Luther Perkins, Jack Clement, Norman Blake, Billy Strange, Johnny Western, Roy Nichols - guitar
- Marshall Grant, Buddy Clark - bass
- Buddy Harman, Morris Palmer, W. S. Holland, Irving Kluger, Michael Kazak - drums
- Bill Pursell, Marvin Hughes, James Wilson - piano
- Maybelle Carter - autoharp
- Karl Garvin, Bill McElhiney - trumpet
- Billy Latham - banjo
- Bob Johnston - lute
- Hubert Anderson - vibraphone
- The Carter Family, the Jack Halloran Singers, the Anita Kerr Singers - backing vocals

Additional personnel

- Produced By: Don Law and Frank Jones
- Reissue Producer: Bob Irwin
- Digitally Remastered for CD by: Vic Anesini, Sony Music Studios, NY
- Cover Photo: Frank Bez
- Liner Notes: Joe Goldberg

== Charts ==
Album - Billboard (United States)

Year	Chart	Position
1963	Country Albums	1
1963	Billboard Top LPs	26

Singles - Billboard (United States)

Year	Single	Chart	Position
1961	"The Rebel – Johnny Yuma"	Country Singles	24
1961	"Tennessee Flat Top Box"	Country Singles	11
1961	"Tennessee Flat Top Box"	Pop Singles	84
1962	"The Big Battle"	Country Singles	24
1962	"Bonanza"	Pop Singles	94
1963	"What Do I Care"	Country Singles	7
1963	"What Do I Care"	Pop Singles	52
1963	"Ring of Fire"	Country Singles	1
1963	"Ring of Fire"	Pop Singles	17
