= Hymns by Johnny Cash =

Studio album by Johnny Cash
- Released: March 2, 1959
- Recorded: July 24, 1958–January 23, 1959
- Studios: Bradley (Nashville, Tennessee)
- Genres: Gospel; country
- Length: 26:40
- Label: Columbia
- Producer: Don Law

Johnny Cash chronology
Johnny Cash Sings the Songs That Made Him Famous (1958)	Hymns by Johnny Cash (1959)	Songs of Our Soil (1959)

Professional ratings
Review scores
Source	Rating
AllMusic	4/5 stars
The Encyclopedia of Popular Music	1/5 stars
The Rolling Stone Album Guide	3/5 stars

Hymns by Johnny Cash is the third studio album and first gospel album by American singer Johnny Cash. The album was produced in 1958 and released in 1959. An alternate version of the song It was Jesus was an added bonus track after the album was re-issued in 2002. Cash said he left Sun Records because Sam Phillips would not let him record a gospel album. Columbia promised him to release an occasional gospel album; this was a success for him to record. The album was Cash’s first and most popular gospel album, and is an example of traditional hymns set to country gospel music. The album was recorded simultaneously with The Fabulous Johnny Cash.

== Critical reception ==
The Rolling Stone Album Guide deemed the album "fairly uninspiring". Billboard called "It Was Jesus" and "I Saw a Man" "outstanding".

== Track listing ==
Side one
No.	Title	Writer(s)	Recording date	Length
1.	"It Was Jesus"	John R. Cash	July 24, 1958	2:08
2.	"I Saw a Man"	Arthur Smith	January 23, 1959	2:36
3.	"Are All the Children In"	Craig Starrett	January 23, 1959	1:58
4.	"The Old Account"	Traditional; arranged by J. R. Cash	January 13, 1959	2:29
5.	"Lead Me Gently Home"	Will L. Thompson	January 23, 1959	2:04
6.	"Swing Low, Sweet Chariot"	Traditional; arranged and adapted by J. R. Cash	January 13, 1959	1:56

Side two
No.	Title	Writer(s)	Recording date	Length
1.	"Snow in His Hair"	Marshall Pack	January 13, 1959	2:24
2.	"Lead Me Father"	J. R. Cash	August 13, 1958	2:31
3.	"I Call Him"	J. R. Cash; Roy Cash	January 23, 1959	1:50
4.	"These Things Shall Pass"	Stuart Hamblen	January 23, 1959	2:20
5.	"He'll Be a Friend"	J. R. Cash	January 23, 1959	2:00
6.	"God Will"	John D. Loudermilk; Marijohn Wilkin	January 13, 1959	2:24

2002 reissue bonus track
No.	Title	Writer(s)	Recording date	Length
13.	"It Was Jesus" (Mono EP Version)	J. R. Cash	July 24, 1958	2:04

== Personnel ==
Musicians

- Johnny Cash - vocals, rhythm guitar
- Luther Perkins - lead guitar
- Don Helms - steel guitar
- Marshall Grant - bass
- Marvin Hughes - piano
- Buddy Harman - drums
- Morris Palmer - drums on "Lead Me Father"
- The Jordanaires - backing vocals

Additional personnel

- Al Quaglieri - producer
- Don Law - producer
- Seth Foster - mastering
- Mark Wilder - mastering, mixing
- Hal Adams - photography
- Don Hunstein - photography
- Stacey Boyle - tape research
- Matt Kelly - tape research
- Kay Smith - tape research
- Steven Berkowitz - A&R
- Darren Salmieri - A&R
- Patti Matheny - A&R
- Howard Fritzson - art direction
- Randall Martin - design
- Nick Shaffran - consultant
- Johnny Whiteside - liner notes
