= The Sound of Johnny Cash =

Studio album by Johnny Cash
- Released: June 4, 1962
- Recorded: April 28, 1961–February 12, 1962
- Genre: Country; rockabilly; blues
- Length: 25:12
- Label: Columbia
- Producer: Don Law; Frank Jones

Johnny Cash chronology
Hymns from the Heart (1962)	The Sound of Johnny Cash (1962)	All Aboard the Blue Train with Johnny Cash (1962)

Singles from The Sound of Johnny Cash
- 1. "In the Jailhouse Now" Released: May 4, 1962

Professional ratings
Review scores
Source	Rating
AllMusic	3/5 stars
Billboard	4/4 stars

The Sound of Johnny Cash is the eighth studio album by American singer-songwriter Johnny Cash, released on June 4, 1962. Among other songs, it contains "In the Jailhouse Now", a Jimmie Rodgers cover which reached #8 on the Country charts, and "Delia's Gone", which Cash would re-record years later, on American Recordings, in 1994. Cash would also go on to record a significantly slower, more ballad-like version of "I'm Free from the Chain Gang Now", which was ultimately released in 2006 on American V: A Hundred Highways as the last track on the album.

During the recording sessions for the album, Cash rerecorded his Sun Records hits "Folsom Prison Blues", "Hey, Porter" and "I Walk the Line", but none of these versions were ultimately used on the album and sat unreleased until the 1990s.

== Cover imagery ==
The original 1962 album features a photograph of Johnny Cash taken by American photographer Leigh Wiener at his studio in Los Angeles, California.

== Track listing ==
Side one
No.	Title	Writer(s)	Length
1.	"Lost on the Desert"	Dallas Frazier, Buddy Mize	2:01
2.	"Accidentally on Purpose"	Darrell Edwards, George Jones	1:56
3.	"In the Jailhouse Now"	Jimmie Rodgers	2:23
4.	"Mr. Lonesome"	Tompall Glaser	2:18
5.	"You Won't Have Far to Go"	Charles Glaser	1:50
6.	"Cotton Fields (The Cotton Song)"	Lead Belly	2:34

Side two
No.	Title	Writer(s)	Length
7.	"Delia's Gone"	Karl Silbersdorf, Dick Toops	2:01
8.	"I Forgot More Than You'll Ever Know"	Cecil A. Null	2:27
9.	"You Remembered Me"	Cash	2:05
10.	"I'm Free from the Chain Gang Now"	Lou Herscher, Saul Klein	1:51
11.	"Let Me Down Easy"	Tompall Glaser, Jim Glaser	1:46
12.	"Sing It Pretty, Sue"	Cash	2:00

== Personnel ==
- Johnny Cash - vocals, rhythm guitar
- Luther Perkins - lead guitar
- Ray Edenton – guitar
- Marshall Grant - bass
- Floyd Cramer - piano
- Buddy Harman - drums
- Don Helms - steel guitar

== Charts ==
The album did not chart in the Billboard album charts. In 1962 the single "In the Jailhouse Now" peaked at #8 in the Billboard Country Singles.
