= Jackson (song) =

Song by Billy Edd Wheeler and Jerry Leiber, popularized in 1967

Single by Johnny Cash and June Carter

from the album Carryin' On with Johnny Cash and June Carter
- B-side: "Pack Up Your Sorrows"
- Released: February 6, 1967
- Recorded: January 11, 1967
- Genre: Country
- Length: 2:45
- Label: Columbia Records
- Songwriters: Billy Edd Wheeler and Jerry Leiber (as Gaby Rodgers)
- Producers: Don Law and Frank Jones

Johnny Cash and June Carter singles chronology
"It Ain't Me Babe" (1965)	"Jackson" (1967)	"Long-Legged Guitar Pickin' Man" (1967)

"Jackson" is a song written in 1963 by Billy Edd Wheeler and Jerry Leiber. It was recorded in 1963 by the Kingston Trio, Wheeler, and Flatt and Scruggs. It achieved its most notable popularity with two 1967 releases: a country hit single by Johnny Cash and June Carter, which reached No. 2 on the Billboard Country Singles chart, and a pop hit single by Nancy Sinatra and Lee Hazlewood, which reached No. 14 on the Billboard Hot 100 and No. 39 on Easy Listening.

== Background ==
Actress Gaby Rodgers is cited as co-author of "Jackson", because Leiber, in writing it with Wheeler, used his then-wife's name as a pseudonym. First recorded in 1963 by Wheeler, he explains the evolution of the song, and Leiber's contribution:

"Jackson" came to me when I read the script for Edward Albee's Who's Afraid of Virginia Woolf? (I was too broke to see the play on Broadway) ... When I played it for Jerry [Leiber], he said "Your first verses suck", or words to that effect. "Throw them away and start the song with your last verse, 'We got married in a fever, hotter than a pepper sprout.'" When I protested to Jerry that I couldn't start the song with the climax, he said, "Oh, yes you can." So I rewrote the song and thanks to Jerry's editing and help, it worked. I recorded the song on my first Kapp Records album, with Joan Sommer, an old friend from Berea, Kentucky, singing the woman's part. Johnny Cash learned the song from that album, A New Bag of Songs, produced by Jerry and Mike.

== Story ==
The song is about a married couple who find that the "fire" has gone out of their relationship. It relates the desire of both partners to travel to "Jackson" where the husband believes he will be turned loose, be with many women and be practically worshipped as he has his wild time. The wife says he is going to achieve nothing but the damaging of his health and that people are going to see him as a fool. She says she will be there waiting, having her own fun laughing at him.

There has been much speculation regarding which city of Jackson the song is about, but Wheeler said: "Actually, I didn't have a specific Jackson in mind. I just liked the sharp consonant sound, as opposed to soft-sounding words like Nashville." Though Wheeler had no particular Jackson in mind when writing the song, some subsequent singers have specified Jackson, Tennessee. The previous source also quotes Charlie Daniels as having recorded "Jackson" with these lines, "I ain't talking 'bout Jackson, Mississippi. I'm talking 'bout Jackson, Tennessee". And, Johnny Cash is quoted in the video from the same source: "Well, I was gonna take her down to see Carl Perkins in Jackson." Carl Perkins lived in Jackson, Tennessee.

== Critical reception ==
In 2024, Rolling Stone ranked the song at #112 on its 200 Greatest Country Songs of All Time ranking.

== Notable recordings ==
Johnny Cash and June Carter released a version in February 1967, reaching No. 2 on the US Country charts and winning a Grammy Award in 1968 for Best Country & Western Performance Duet, Trio or Group. This version was reprised by Joaquin Phoenix and Reese Witherspoon, performing as Johnny Cash and June Carter, in the 2005 film Walk the Line, and also appears on the soundtrack of the 2011 film The Help.

Nancy Sinatra and Lee Hazlewood released a version of the song in July 1967, hitting No. 14 on the US Chart that year. Their cover also peaked at No. 4 in South Africa. It also performed very well in continental Europe, where it made No. 8 in the then West Germany, No. 4 in Austria, No. 9 in the Netherlands, No. 2 in Flemish-speaking Belgium, No. 3 in French-speaking Belgium, and No. 4 in Norway. The song was featured in Nancy Sinatra's 1967 TV special Movin' with Nancy.

The Australian rock band INXS included "Jackson" on the 1985 release of their Dekadance EP. This version featured a duet between lead singer Michael Hutchence and backing singer (and later star in her own right), Jenny Morris.

Phil Alvin and Exene Cervenka recorded their version for Fun on Saturday Night, a 2012 album by Alvin's band, the Blasters.

Trixie Mattel and Orville Peck released a version of the song in 2021, first as a single and then as part of Mattel's EP Full Coverage, Vol. 1.

== Legacy ==
According to the Guinness Book of British Hit Singles & Albums, the name of UK pop band Prefab Sprout was a mondegreen from the lyrics "We got married in a fever, hotter than a pepper sprout", misheard by frontman Paddy McAloon. McAloon has maintained, however, that the name was entirely made up.

"Jackson" is featured in the pilot episode and the finale of Defiance; in the pilot the two main characters listen to the song and then sing along. In the finale one of those characters, Nolan, asks if a recording of the song is available, and quotes one line of it as he leaves Earth.

== Certifications ==
Region	Certification	Certified units/sales
United Kingdom (BPI)	Silver	200,000^{‡}
^{‡} Sales+streaming figures based on certification alone.
