= Autry Inman =

American country singer-songwriter (1929–1988)

- Birth name: Robert Autry Inman
- Born: January 6, 1929
- Origin: Florence, Alabama, U.S.
- Died: September 6, 1988 (aged 59)
- Genres: Country
- Occupation: Singer-songwriter
- Instrument: Guitar
- Years active: 1953–1968
- Labels: Epic, Koala

Robert Autry Inman (January 6, 1929 – September 6, 1988) was an American country and rockabilly musician.

== Biography ==
Inman was born in Florence, Alabama, and was performing on local radio station WLAY by age 14. He used his middle name "Autry" (or "Autrey") as his stage name. After completing school he worked as a reporter for the Lauderdale Co. Law & Equity Court.

Shortly thereafter he was tapped to join Cowboy Copas's band, the Oklahoma Cowboys, as a bassist. Aside from this he also played in George Morgan's Candy Kids until 1952. He released his first solo singles on the small label Bullet Records; in 1952 he signed with Decca Records, for whom he recorded over 40 country songs. However, service in the Army interrupted his career. After his discharge he switched to playing rockabilly music in 1956, then at the height of its popularity. His first single in the style, "Be Bop Baby" b/w "It Would Be a Doggone Lie", became the best-known of his rockabilly titles. He changed to RCA Records in 1958, releasing further rockabilly singles but to limited success. In the 1960s, he recorded for Mercury Records, United Artists Records, Sims Records, Guest Star Records, and Jubilee Records where he cut some adult stand-up comedy albums.

In addition to being a vocalist, Inman was a well-respected songwriter, and his tunes were covered by the likes of Dolly Parton, Waylon Jennings, Johnny Cash, George Jones, Moon Mullican and Hank Williams, as well as The Louvin Brothers and Alison Krauss (the latter two recording "I Don't Believe You've Met My Baby"). In 1968, he released a single with Bob Luman entitled "Ballad of Two Brothers", which turned out to be his biggest hit in the U.S., reaching No. 14 on the country charts and No. 48 on the Billboard Hot 100. His final recordings were made in the mid-1980s for the Koala label. He died on September 6, 1988, at age 59.

== Discography ==
=== Albums ===
| Year | Album | Label |
|---|---|---|
| 1968 | Ballad of Two Brothers | Epic |

=== Singles ===
| Year | Single | Chart Positions | | | | Album |
| Year | Single | US Country | US | CAN Country | CAN | Album |
|---|---|---|---|---|---|---|
| 1953 | "That's All Right" | 4 | — | — | — | singles only |
| 1963 | "The Volunteer" | 22 | — | — | — | singles only |
| 1968 | "Ballad of Two Brothers" | 14 | 48 | 7 | 41 | Ballad of Two Brothers |
