= Five Feet High and Rising (song) =

Single by Johnny Cash

from the album Songs of Our Soil
- A-side: "Five Feet High and Rising" "I Got Stripes"
- Released: July 1959
- Genre: Country; folk
- Length: 1:46
- Label: Columbia 4-41427
- Songwriter: Johnny Cash
- Producer: Don Law

Audio
- "Five Feet High and Rising" on YouTube

Professional ratings
Review scores
| Source | Rating |
|---|---|
| Billboard | Spotlight winner of the week |

"Five Feet High and Rising" is a song written and originally recorded by Johnny Cash.

The song was recorded by Cash on March 12, 1959, for his third Columbia album and released as a single on July 6, 1959, with "I Got Stripes" (another song from the same recording session) on the opposite side.

== Content ==
The song is a first-person account of the 1937 flood that Cash, then aged four years and 11 months, endured with his family. They had to leave their home and flee.

== Legacy ==
The song provided the inspiration for the name of De La Soul's debut album "3 Feet High and Rising" and is sampled in the song "The Magic Number".

== Charts ==
| Chart (1959) | Peak position |
|---|---|
| US Billboard Hot 100 | 76 |
| US Hot Country Songs (Billboard) | 14 |
