= I Got Stripes =

Song recorded by Johnny Cash

"On a Monday"

Single by Lead Belly
- Released: 1939
- Genre: Country

"I Got Stripes"

Single by Johnny Cash
- A-side: "I Got Stripes" "Five Feet High and Rising"
- Released: July 1959
- Genre: Country
- Length: 2:04
- Label: Columbia 4-41427
- Songwriters: Charlie Williams, Johnny Cash

Johnny Cash singles chronology
"Katy Too" (1959)	"I Got Stripes" (1959)	"Goodbye Little Darlin'" (1959)

Audio
- "I Got Stripes" on YouTube

Professional ratings
Review scores
Source	Rating
Billboard	Spotlight winner of the week

"I Got Stripes" is a song recorded by Johnny Cash. The song is credited to Charlie Williams and Cash, but they borrowed from a song by Lead Belly titled "On a Monday".

Lead Belly's original, also known as "Yellow Women's Door Bells" and "Almost Done", was recorded and released by him in 1939 and reflected his "prison experiences".

== Johnny Cash version ==
The song was recorded by Cash on March 12, 1959, and released as a single in July, with "Five Feet High and Rising" (another song from the same recording session) on the opposite side.

According to Robert Hilburn and his book Johnny Cash: The Life, "I Got Stripes" is a "raucous prison tale" written by Johnny Cash and Charlie Williams, a DJ from Los Angeles and Cash's friend.

=== Charts ===
Chart (1959)	Peak position
US Billboard Hot 100	43
US Hot Country Songs (Billboard)	4
