= Smiling Bill McCall =

Single by Johnny Cash
- A-side: "Smiling Bill McCall" "Seasons of My Heart"
- Released: March 1960
- Genre: country
- Label: Columbia 4-41618
- Songwriter: Johnny Cash

Johnny Cash singles chronology
| "Straight A's in Love" (1959) | "Smiling Bill McCall" (1960) | "Second Honeymoon (song)" (1960) |

Music video
- "Smiling Bill McCall" (audio only) on YouTube

"Smiling Bill McCall" is a song written and originally recorded by Johnny Cash.

The song was released as a single by Columbia Records (Columbia 4-41618, with "Seasons of My Heart" on the opposite side) in March or April 1960.

== Composition ==
It is a story song.

== Charts ==
| Chart (1960) | Peak position |
|---|---|
| US Bubbling Under Hot 100 (Billboard) | 110 |
| US Hot Country Songs (Billboard) | 13 |
