= Koncert v Praze (In Prague – Live) =

Live album by Johnny Cash
- Released: October 1983
- Recorded: April 11, 1978
- Venue: Sportovní hala, Prague
- Genre: Country; rock; folk
- Label: Columbia & Supraphon
- Producer: Michal Bukovič

Johnny Cash chronology
Johnny 99 (1983)	Koncert v Praze (In Prague – Live) (1983)	Biggest Hits (1984)

Koncert v Praze (In Prague – Live) (1983) is an live album by American country singer Johnny Cash.

== Track listing ==
1. "Ring of Fire"
2. "Folsom Prison Blues"
3. "I Still Miss Someone"
4. "Big River"
5. "I Ride an Old Paint" & "Streets of Laredo"
6. "Sunday Morning Coming Down"
7. "I Walk the Line"
8. "Last Date" (instrumental, performed by Earl Poole Ball)
9. "City of New Orleans"
10. "Hey Porter" & "Wreck Of the Old '97" & "Casey Jones" & "Orange Blossom Special"
11. "Wabash Cannonball"

== Personnel ==
- Johnny Cash – vocals and acoustic rhythm guitar (except “Last Date”)
- The Carter Family, Jan Howard – chorus
- The Tennessee Three
  - Marshall Grant – bass guitar
  - W. S. "Fluke" Holland – drums
  - Bob Wootton – lead guitar
  - Jerry Hensley – rhythm guitar
  - Earl Poole Ball – piano
