= The Legend of Johnny Cash =

Compilation album by Johnny Cash
- Released: October 25, 2005
- Recorded: 1955–2002
- Genres: Country; outlaw country; gospel
- Length: 64:58
- Labels: Island; American; Legacy; Columbia
- Producer: Rick Rubin

Johnny Cash chronology
The Legend (2005)	The Legend of Johnny Cash (2005)	June Carter and Johnny Cash: Duets (2006)

Professional ratings
Review scores
Source	Rating
Allmusic	3.5/5 stars
Tom Hull	A−

The Legend of Johnny Cash is a single-disc compilation album of American musician and singer Johnny Cash's career. It is the first such album to contain material from Cash's American Recordings era in addition to songs from his time at Sun and Columbia, as well as one track recorded for Island Records. It was released on October 25, 2005, on the Island/American/Columbia/Legacy record labels and tied to the release of the Cash biopic Walk the Line. In the wake of that film's success its sales made the compilation an overwhelming success. The album was certified Gold on December 7, 2005, Platinum on December 14, 2005, and 2× Platinum on May 19, 2006, by the RIAA. As of November 2017, the album has sold 3,866,300 copies in the United States.

A UK version entitled Ring of Fire: The Legend of Johnny Cash has a different track listing.

== Track listing ==
No.	Title	Writer(s)	Length
1.	"Cry! Cry! Cry!"	Johnny Cash	2:24
2.	"Hey, Porter"	Johnny Cash	2:13
3.	"Folsom Prison Blues"	Johnny Cash	2:49
4.	"I Walk the Line"	Johnny Cash	2:45
5.	"Get Rhythm"	Johnny Cash	2:14
6.	"Big River"	Johnny Cash	2:32
7.	"Guess Things Happen That Way"	Jack Clement	1:51
8.	"Ring of Fire"	June Carter Cash, Merle Kilgore	2:37
9.	"Jackson" (with June Carter)	Jerry Leiber, Billy Edd Wheeler	2:46
10.	"A Boy Named Sue" (live)	Shel Silverstein	3:46
11.	"Sunday Mornin' Comin' Down"	Kris Kristofferson	4:07
12.	"Man in Black"	Johnny Cash	2:52
13.	"One Piece at a Time"	Wayne Kemp	4:02
14.	"Highwayman" (with Willie Nelson, Waylon Jennings, and Kris Kristofferson (as The Highwaymen))	Jimmy Webb	3:03
15.	"The Wanderer" (U2 with Johnny Cash)	Bono-U2	4:45
16.	"Delia's Gone"	Johnny Cash, Karl Silbersdorf, Dick Toops	2:19
17.	"Rusty Cage"	Chris Cornell	2:49
18.	"I've Been Everywhere"	Geoff Mack	3:16
19.	"Give My Love to Rose"	Johnny Cash	3:27
20.	"The Man Comes Around" (early take)	Johnny Cash	3:50
21.	"Hurt"	Trent Reznor	3:38
Total length:			64:58

=== Alternate UK track listing ===
A version released in the UK entitled Ring of Fire: The Legend of Johnny Cash has a slightly altered track listing, with some of the above songs absent and others, such as covers of U2's "One" and Depeche Mode's "Personal Jesus", included in their place.

UK Edition
No.	Title	Writer(s)	Producer(s)	Length
1.	"Ring of Fire" (1963)	June Carter Cash, Merle Kilgore	Don Law, Frank Jones	2:36
2.	"I Walk the Line" (1956)	Johnny Cash	Sam Phillips	2:46
3.	"Jackson" (1967)	Billy Edd Wheeler, Jerry Leiber	Don Law, Frank Jones	2:46
4.	"Folsom Prison Blues" (1956)	Johnny Cash	Sam Phillips	2:51
5.	"A Boy Named Sue (live)" (1969)	Shel Silverstein	Bob Johnston	3:46
6.	"Big River" (1958)	Johnny Cash	Jack Clement, Sam Phillips	2:31
7.	"Get Rhythm" (1956)	Johnny Cash	Sam Phillips	2:13
8.	"Cry! Cry! Cry!" (1955)	Johnny Cash	Sam Phillips	2:24
9.	"Hey Porter" (1955)	Johnny Cash	Sam Phillips	2:14
10.	"A Thing Called Love" (1972)	Jerry R Hubbard	Larry Butler	2:32
11.	"Guess Things Happen That Way" (1958)	Jack Clement	Jack Clement	1:52
12.	"San Quentin (live)" (1969)	Johnny Cash	Bob Johnston	3:07
13.	"Man in Black" (1971)	Johnny Cash	Johnny Cash	2:53
14.	"Highwayman" (1985)	Jimmy Webb	Chips Moman	3:03
15.	"The Wanderer - U2 Starring Johnny Cash" (1993)	Bono-U2	Flood, Brian Eno, The Edge	4:44
16.	"I've Been Everywhere" (1996)	Geoff Mack	Rick Rubin	3:17
17.	"Rusty Cage" (1996)	Chris Cornell	Rick Rubin	2:50
18.	"Personal Jesus" (2002)	Martin Lee Gore	Rick Rubin	3:19
19.	"Give My Love to Rose" (2002)	Johnny Cash	Rick Rubin	3:28
20.	"One" (2000)	Bono-U2	Rick Rubin	3:52
21.	"Hurt" (2002)	Trent Reznor	Rick Rubin	3:39
Total length:				62:30

== Personnel ==
- Johnny Cash – vocals, guitar, harmonica, piano, production

=== Additional personnel ===
- Rick Rubin, Steven Berkowitz, Charlie Bragg, Gregg Geller, Bob Johnston, Frank Jones, Don Law, Andy McKaie, Chips Moman – production
- Gavin Lurssen, Dana Smart – remastering
- Adam Abrams – production coordination
- Tom Jermann/t42design – design
- David Gahr, Don Hunstein, Les Leverett, Jim Marshall, Alan Messer – photography
- Ryan Null – photo coordination
- Adam Starr – product manager
- Rich Kienzle – liner notes
- Compilation produced by Rick Rubin
- Engineered by David R. Ferguson

== Charts and certifications ==
=== Weekly charts ===
Chart (2005–06)	Peak position
Australian Albums (ARIA)	10
Austrian Albums (Ö3 Austria)	10
Belgian Albums (Ultratop Flanders)	31
Belgian Albums (Ultratop Wallonia)	55
Canadian Albums (Billboard)	5
Danish Albums (Hitlisten)	4
Dutch Albums (Album Top 100)	21
French Compilations Albums (SNEP)	9
German Albums (Offizielle Top 100)	15
Irish Albums (IRMA)	1
New Zealand Albums (RMNZ)	2
Norwegian Albums (VG-lista)	2
Scottish Albums (Official Charts)	6
Spanish Albums (Promusicae)	92
Swedish Albums (Sverigetopplistan)	12
Swiss Albums (Schweizer Hitparade)	21
UK Albums (Official Charts)	11
US Billboard 200	5
US Top Country Albums (Billboard)	2

=== Year-end charts ===
Chart (2006)	Position
Australian Albums (ARIA)	71
Swedish Albums (Sverigetopplistan)	82
UK Albums (OCC)	64
US Billboard 200	9
US Top Country Albums (Billboard)	4

Chart (2007)	Position
US Billboard 200	191
US Top Country Albums (Billboard)	32

Chart (2014)	Position
US Billboard 200	80

Chart (2017)	Position
US Top Country Albums (Billboard)	36

Chart (2018)	Position
US Top Country Albums (Billboard)	70

=== Certifications ===
Region	Certification	Certified units/sales
Australia (ARIA)	Gold	35,000^{^}
Ireland (IRMA)	5× Platinum	75,000^{^}
New Zealand (RMNZ)	Platinum	15,000^{^}
United Kingdom (BPI)	2× Platinum	600,000^{*}
United States (RIAA)	2× Platinum	3,866,300
Summaries
Europe (IFPI)	Platinum	1,000,000^{*}
^{*} Sales figures based on certification alone.^{^} Shipments figures based on certification alone.
