= The Sound Behind Johnny Cash =

Studio album by The Tennessee Three
- Released: 1971
- Recorded: 1971
- Genre: Country
- Label: Columbia

The Sound Behind Johnny Cash is the only album released by Johnny Cash's band, The Tennessee Three. It contains instrumental versions of 11 Johnny Cash hits. It was released in 1971 on Columbia Records. Billboard described it as "illuminative instrumental work."

== Track listing ==
Side one

1. "A Boy Named Sue"
2. "Daddy Sang Bass"
3. "Folsom Prison Blues"
4. "I Walk the Line"
5. "Understand Your Man"
6. "Ring of Fire"

Side two

7. "Wreck of the Old '97"
8. "Cry, Cry, Cry"
9. "I Still Miss Someone"
10. "Tennessee Flat Top Box"
11. "Forty Shades of Green"

== Personnel ==
- Marshall Grant – electric bass
- W.S. Holland – drums
- Bob Wootton – electric guitar
