= The Great Eighties Eight =

US musical group

The Great Eighties Eight (Seven after 1981/The Johnny Cash Show Band after 1982) was Johnny Cash's band during the 1980s. It was formed after longtime bass player Marshall Grant left the Tennessee Three, and Cash extended his band. The people and number of people changed frequently throughout the 1980s and by 1981 only seven people remained, making the band the Great Eighties Seven. This band was not as popular as The Tennessee Three, and did not have the fanbase that the original Tennessee Two/Three had enjoyed.

== History ==
=== 1980s ===
In March 1980, Marshall Grant, the last remaining member of Cash's original band, the Tennessee Two, had a rather unfortunate departure from the Tennessee Three. With him left the name, the Tennessee Three and a void in the band. A new bassist needed to be hired and Cash filled this position with Joe Allen, one of Nashville's best bassists at the time. Another new member was added to the band, a young man named Marty Stuart. The new line-up was now W. S. Holland, Bob Wootton, Earl Ball, Joe Allen, Marty Stuart, Jerry Hensley, Jack Hale Jr., and Bob Lewin. The band was renamed the Great Eighties Eight. In late 1980-early 1981 (date is unknown), Joe Allen left the Great Eighties Eight and in his place, Cash hired Henry Strezlecki, another well-known session bassist. Strezlecki played bass with Cash until spring 1981 and his playing can be heard on The Survivors Live album, which was recorded in April 1981. Sometime in mid-spring 1981, a bassist named Bodie Powell played with Cash's band but later that summer left the road and continued working for House of Cash Records, as well as in the studio. By late May 1981, Marty Stuart had moved to playing bass in the band. No longer eight members, the name was changed to the Great Eighties Seven. Stuart played bass for the band well into 1982 when Cash's future son-in-law, Jimmy Tittle, was hired to take over duties. It was also sometime in 1982 (Spring-Summer) that Jerry Hensley left the band to pursue other interests. The septet was once again renamed, this time to The Johnny Cash Show Band. The line-up of this band remained unchanged for quite some time, until late 1985/early 1986 when Marty Stuart left the band to pursue his solo career, and Jim Soldi was found by Marty to take his place as second guitarist. It was also in early 1986 that Jimmy Tittle left for a short time and Joe Allen was re-hired. At this point in time (early 1987), Cash took his show to Austin, Texas and recorded live at Austin City Limits. The recordings were released in part in 2006 and the band playing was the Show Band of this era. By late 1987/early 1988 Jimmy Tittle had returned to playing the bass and Jim Elliott on lead guitar. The band remained unchanged until September 1989 when the majority of the band left for one reason or another. Bob Wootton, Jim Soldi, Jimmy Tittle, Jack Hale Jr. and Bob Lewin left the Show Band and Cash was forced to find a new bassist. In September 1989 he hired Kerry Marx and Steve Logan as new bassists, respectively.

=== 1990s ===
The new Johnny Cash Show band stayed with Cash until 1992 and can be heard and seen on The Great Lost Performance, and Cash for Kenya-Live in Johnstown. In December 1992, Kerry Marx and Steve Logan both left the Johnny Cash Show Band and Cash re-hired longtime guitarist Bob Wootton, and new timer, Dave Roe to fill in for bassist. This new Show Band, which at time could be up to six member was formed on the dawn of Cash's American Recordings days. David Carter Jones, Cash's nephew would play second guitar off and on from 1993 to 1995, and his playing can be seen on the Live in Ireland 1993 DVD. John Carter Cash, son of Johnny Cash and June Carter Cash would also play rhythm guitar during the 1990s, but both these men were not permanent members of the Show band. In 1994–95, Earl Poole Ball was away quite a lot, so at time, the band was a three-piece band, bringing back the old Tennessee Three days. As Cash was becoming a household name again with his American Recordings success, the demand for his appearance live was as high as ever. Cash and their Show Band toured all over the world until 1997, when illness forced Cash to retire, and the band to find other jobs. In 1999, when the All-Star Tribute to Johnny Cash was planned and filmed, Cash made a surprise visit appearance singing "Folsom Prison Blues" and "I Walk the Line". Backing him were WS Holland, Bob Wootton, Earl Poole Ball, John Carter Cash and for the first time in 19 years, Marshall Grant on bass. This was the last time Cash appeared at any major event, backed by a full band.

== Personnel ==
The following list illustrates the musicians who were involved with this band at some time, what instrument they played, and how long they were in the band.

- W. S. Holland – drums 1960–97
- Hugh Wadell – drums May 1989 (while WS Holland was ill) also in 1994
- Bob Wootton – electric guitar 1968–89 1992–97
- Jerry Hensley – guitar 1974–2003
- Marty Stuart – guitar, mandolin, fiddle, bass 1980–85
- Kerry Marx – guitar 1989–92
- Jim Elliott – guitar 1987–90 (part-time)
- Jim Soldi – guitar 1985–89
- John Carter Cash – guitar 1992–97 (part-time)
- David Carter Jones – guitar 1993–95 (part-time)
- Earl Poole Ball – piano 1980–97
- Larry McCoy - piano 1975–1977
- Larry Butler - piano 1971–1974
- Bill Walker - piano 1971-1973 (occasionally)
- Walter Cunningham - piano 1971-1973 (occasionally)
- Bunky Keels - piano 1989
- Jack Hale Jr. – trumpet, French horn, harmonica 1980–89
- Bob Lewin – trumpet, French hor n, keyboards 1980–89
- Gordon Terry - Fiddle 1971–1976
- Tommy Williams - fiddle 1971-1975 (occasionally)
- Joe Allen – bass 1980–81, 1986–87
- Chris Powell - bass 1981 (occasionally)
- Bodie Powell – bass 1981
- Henry (Pershing) Strzelecki – bass 1981
- Jimmy Tittle – bass 1982–86 1987–89
- Steve Logan – bass 1989–92
- Dave Roe – bass 1992–97
