= Kindred Spirits: A Tribute to the Songs of Johnny Cash =

Compilation album by Various artists
- Released: September 24, 2002
- Genre: Country, rock and roll
- Length: 45:39
- Label: Legacy
- Producer: Jeb Brian, Thom Cadley, Bruce Springsteen, Marty Stuart

Various artists chronology
Dressed in Black: A Tribute to Johnny Cash (2002)	Kindred Spirits: A Tribute to the Songs of Johnny Cash (2002)	Johnny's Blues: A Tribute To Johnny Cash (2003)

Professional ratings
Review scores
Source	Rating
Allmusic	2.5/5 stars

Kindred Spirits: A Tribute to the Songs of Johnny Cash is a tribute album to country singer Johnny Cash, released on Legacy Recordings on September 24, 2002 (see 2002 in music), several days after the previous tribute album to Cash, Dressed in Black. The record features several legendary musicians, including Little Richard and Bob Dylan, as well as Cash's daughter Rosanne. It concentrates primarily on Cash's biggest hits, such as "Folsom Prison Blues", "Hey Porter" and "I Walk the Line", although "Ring of Fire", one of Cash's most well-known songs, was not covered.

== Track listing ==
No.	Title	Artist	Length
1.	"Understand Your Man"	Dwight Yoakam	3:13
2.	"I Still Miss Someone"	Rosanne Cash	3:14
3.	"Train of Love"	Bob Dylan	3:23
4.	"Get Rhythm"	Little Richard	3:02
5.	"Folsom Prison Blues"	Keb Mo'	3:53
6.	"I Walk the Line"	Travis Tritt	4:18
7.	"Big River"	Hank Williams Jr.	3:07
8.	"Give My Love to Rose"	Bruce Springsteen	2:55
9.	"Don't Take Your Guns to Town"	Charlie Robison	3:46
10.	"Flesh and Blood"	Mary Chapin Carpenter, Sheryl Crow and Emmylou Harris	3:44
11.	"Hardin Wouldn't Run"	Steve Earle	4:23
12.	"Hey Porter"	Marty Stuart	2:32
13.	"Meet Me in Heaven"	Janette Carter, Johnny Cash, June Carter Cash, Earl Scruggs, Connie Smith, Marty Stuart and Darrin Vincent	3:21
14.	"For Luther (I Walk the Line Reprise)"	The Mudcats	0:48

== Personnel ==
- Dwight Yoakam - Vocals
- Rosanne Cash - Vocals
- Bob Dylan - Vocals
- Little Richard - Vocals
- Keb Mo' - Vocals
- Travis Tritt - Vocals
- Hank Williams Jr. - Vocals
- Charlie Robison - Vocals
- Mary Chapin Carpenter - Vocals
- Sheryl Crow - Vocals
- Emmylou Harris - Vocals
- Steve Earle - Vocals
- Janette Carter - Vocals
- Johnny Cash - Vocals
- June Carter Cash - Vocals
- Earl Scruggs - Vocals
- Connie Smith - Vocals
- Darrin Vincent - Vocals
- Marty Stuart - Vocals, Producer
- Bruce Springsteen - Vocals, Producer
- The Mudcats - Performers
- Chad Hailey - Engineer
- Claude "Swifty" Achille - Engineer

== Chart performance ==
Chart (2002)	Peak position
U.S. Billboard Top Country Albums	17
U.S. Billboard 200	140
