= Johnny Cash with His Hot and Blue Guitar! =

Studio album by Johnny Cash
- Released: October 11, 1957
- Recorded: September 1954 – August 4, 1957
- Genres: Rockabilly; country
- Length: 27:40
- Label: Sun
- Producer: Sam Phillips

Johnny Cash chronology
Johnny Cash with His Hot and Blue Guitar! (1957)	The Fabulous Johnny Cash (1958)

Singles from Johnny Cash with His Hot and Blue Guitar!
- 1. "Cry! Cry! Cry!" Released: June 21, 1955; 2. "Folsom Prison Blues" Released: December 15, 1955; 3. "I Walk the Line" Released: May 1, 1956

Professional ratings
Review scores
Source	Rating
AllMusic	4.5/5 stars
The Rolling Stone Album Guide	4/5 stars

Johnny Cash with His Hot and Blue Guitar! is the debut studio album by American singer Johnny Cash, released on October 11, 1957. The album contained four of his hit singles: "I Walk the Line," "Cry! Cry! Cry!," "So Doggone Lonesome," and "Folsom Prison Blues." It was re-issued on July 23, 2002, as an expanded edition, under the label Varèse Vintage, containing five bonus tracks, three being alternate versions of tracks already on the original LP. In 2012, Columbia Records reissued the album with 16 additional non-album Sun Records tracks as part of its 63-disc Johnny Cash: The Complete Columbia Album Collection box set. In 2017, 60 years after the original release, the album was remastered under the title Johnny Cash with His Hot and Blue Guitar! (Definitive Expanded Remastered Edition). In 2022, Sun released a remastered edition of the original studio album, with only the original track listing. The songs had been remastered as to simulate being in the studio as the tracks were recorded.

This was one of the first albums ever issued on Sam Phillips' Sun Records label.

== Background ==
Cash auditioned for a place on the music label Sun Records in 1955, but he failed to impress its founder Sam Phillips after presenting himself as a gospel singer. Cash was told to come back with a more commercial sound, as Phillips believed gospel wouldn't sell. Cash returned with the songs "Hey Porter!" and "Cry! Cry! Cry!" and subsequently released them as his debut single on Sun Records in July 1955. On the recording, he was backed by Luther Perkins on guitar and Marshall Grant on bass, dubbed "The Tennessee Two" by Phillips. ("Hey Porter" was not included on the original Sun album, but it was included in later reissues by other labels.)

"Cry! Cry! Cry!" became a commercial success, entering the country charts at #14.

His second single, "Folsom Prison Blues", was released in December 1955 and reached the country Top Five in early 1956.

His final single on With His Hot and Blue Guitar!, "I Walk the Line", continued his success, reaching number one on the country charts and staying there for six weeks, eventually crossing over into the pop Top 20.

== Track listing ==
Side one
No.	Title	Writer(s)	Length
1.	"Rock Island Line"	Unknown	2:11
2.	"(I Heard That) Lonesome Whistle"	Jimmie Davis, Hank Williams	2:25
3.	"Country Boy"	Johnny Cash	1:49
4.	"If the Good Lord's Willing"	Jerry Reed	1:44
5.	"Cry! Cry! Cry!"	Cash	2:29
6.	"(Remember Me) I'm the One Who Loves You"	Stuart Hamblen	2:01

Side two
No.	Title	Writer(s)	Length
7.	"So Doggone Lonesome"	Cash	2:39
8.	"I Was There When It Happened"	Jimmie Davis, Fern Jones	2:17
9.	"I Walk the Line"	Cash	2:46
10.	"Wreck of the Old ’97"	Traditional; arranged by Cash	1:48
11.	"Folsom Prison Blues"	Cash	2:51
12.	"Doin' My Time"	Jimmie Skinner	2:40
Total length:			27:40

Bonus tracks included in 2002 re-issue
No.	Title	Writer(s)	Length
13.	"Hey Porter"		2:14
14.	"Get Rhythm"		2:15
15.	"I Was There When It Happened" (Alternate Version)	Davis, Jones	2:18
16.	"Folsom Prison Blues" (Alternate Version)		2:34
17.	"I Walk the Line" (Alternate Version)		2:40
Total length:			39:41

On the Varèse CD reissue, "Country Boy" is not the original "full band" version from the LP but rather an acoustic version with just Cash and his guitar, which is the demo version; however, the "full band" version is available on iTunes. "Country Boy" was re-recorded for his 1996 album Unchained during his American Recordings period.

See Johnny Cash: The Complete Columbia Album Collection for the track listing of the extended edition included in the 2012 box set.

Arizona-based record store chain Zia Record Exchange reissued the album on an exclusive clear orange vinyl as a limited run of 500 copies in October 2020.

== Personnel ==
- Johnny Cash - vocals, acoustic rhythm guitar

The Tennessee Two

- Luther Perkins - electric lead guitar
- Marshall Grant - double bass

Technical

- Sam Phillips - producer
- Cary E. Mansfield - reissue producer
- Bill Dahl - liner notes, reissue producer
- Dan Hersch - digital remastering
- Bill Pitzonka - art direction

== Charts ==
Singles - Billboard (United States)

Year	Single	Chart	Position
1955	"Cry Cry Cry"	Country Singles	14
1956	"Folsom Prison Blues"	Pop Singles	17
1956	"Folsom Prison Blues"	Country Singles	3
1955	"So Doggone Lonesome"	Country Singles	4
1956	"I Walk the Line"	Country Singles	1
1956	"I Walk the Line"	Pop Singles	17
