= Johnny Cash Remixed =

Remix album by Various artists
- Released: January 27, 2009
- Genre: Country; electronic; hip hop; rock
- Label: Compadre Records

Various artists chronology
All Aboard: A Tribute to Johnny Cash (2008)	Johnny Cash Remixed (2009)

Professional ratings
Review scores
Source	Rating
Allmusic	2/5 stars
The Daily Telegraph	1/5 stars
The Independent	3/5 stars
Los Angeles Times	2/4 stars
Pitchfork Media	0.2/10
Popmatters	6/10
Rolling Stone	2/5 stars
The Scotsman	2/5 stars
The Skinny	1/5 stars
Slant Magazine	0.5/5 stars

Johnny Cash Remixed is a tribute album to country musician, Johnny Cash featuring remixes of Johnny Cash's songs by various artists, such as The Heavy and Alabama 3. It was released by Compadre Records on January 27, 2009. On the second disc of the album is a documentary of the CD's production.

== Track list ==
All tracks are written by Johnny Cash except as noted

No.	Title	Writer(s)	Remixer	Length
1.	"I Walk the Line"		QDT Muzic featuring Snoop Dogg	2:57
2.	"Big River"		Count de Money	3:07
3.	"Get Rhythm"		Philip Steir	4:39
4.	"Doing My Time"		The Heavy	2:59
5.	"Country Boy"		Sonny J	3:35
6.	"Leave That Junk Alone"		Alabama 3	3:04
7.	"Port of Lonely Hearts"		Midnight Juggernauts	4:05
8.	"Folsom Prison Blues"		Pete Rock	3:01
9.	"Straight A's in Love"		Troublemaker	2:53
10.	"Sugartime"	Charlie Phillips, Odis Echols	Kennedy	3:13
11.	"Rock Island Line"	Traditional, arranged by John R. Cash	Steven Wolf	4:33
12.	"Belshazzar"		MacHine Drum	4:57
13.	"I Heard That Lonesome Whistle Blow"	Hank Williams, Jimmie Davis	Apparat	4:06

Bonus Tracks on some editions
No.	Title	Remixer	Length
14.	"Wide Open Road"	Count de Money	2:29
15.	"Trail to Mexico"	Mexican Institute of Sound	2:35
16.	"Hey, Porter"	Mocean Worker	3:35
17.	"Katy Too"	DJ Enjay	4:06
18.	"My Treasure"	J. Scott G	3:48

== Chart performance ==
Chart (2009)	Peak position
U.S. Billboard Top Country Albums	65

== Reviews ==
- Pitchfork
- Blog Critics
- Rolling Stone
- Pop Matters
