= All Aboard: A Tribute to Johnny Cash =

Compilation album by Various artists
- Released: October 21, 2008
- Genre: Country, punk, folk rock
- Label: Anchorless Records

Various artists chronology
Johnny's Blues: A Tribute to Johnny Cash (2003)	All Aboard: A Tribute to Johnny Cash (2008)	Johnny Cash Remixed (2009)

All Aboard: A Tribute to Johnny Cash is a tribute album to country musician Johnny Cash featuring songs from well-known punk and folk rock artists, such as the Bouncing Souls and Chuck Ragan. It was released on Anchorless Records on October 21, 2008. The profits from this album goes to Syrentha Savio Endowment, which provides financial support to underprivileged breast cancer patients.

== Track listing ==
No.	Title	Artist(s)	Length
1.	"Man in Black"	The Bouncing Souls	2:40
2.	"Country Boy"	Fallen from the Sky	2:27
3.	"Wreck of the Old 97"	Chuck Ragan	1:59
4.	"Let the Train Whistle Blow"	Joe McMahon	2:28
5.	"Delia's Gone"	Ben Nichols	2:01
6.	"God's Gonna Cut You Down"	The Gaslight Anthem	2:42
7.	"Cocaine Blues"	The Loved Ones	2:50
8.	"Give My Love to Rose"	OnGuard (featuring Jason Shevchuk)	2:20
9.	"I Still Miss Someone"	Casey James Prestwood	2:24
10.	"Hey Porter"	MxPx	2:01
11.	"Cry! Cry! Cry!"	The Flatliners	2:16
12.	"Ballad of a Teenage Queen"	The Dresden Dolls (featuring Franz Nicolay)	2:59
13.	"Folsom Prison Blues"	Chon Travis	2:30
14.	"There You Go"	The Sainte Catherines	2:13
15.	"I Walk the Line"	Russ Rankin	2:25
16.	"Delia's Gone" (alternate version) (vinyl-only bonus track)	Ben Nichols	2:01
