= Cry! Cry! Cry! =

- 2019 reissue cover art

Single by Johnny Cash

from the album Johnny Cash with His Hot and Blue Guitar!
- B-side: "Hey, Porter"
- Released: June 21, 1955
- Recorded: 1955
- Genre: Rockabilly
- Length: 2:29
- Label: Sun
- Songwriter: Johnny Cash
- Producer: Sam Phillips

Johnny Cash singles chronology
"Cry! Cry! Cry!" (1955)	"Folsom Prison Blues" (1955)

"Cry! Cry! Cry!" is the debut single by singer-songwriter Johnny Cash. The song was originally released in 1955 and reached number 14 on the Best Sellers charts.

== Background ==
In 1954, before the release of the song "Cry! Cry! Cry!", Cash signed with Sun Records after he came home from serving with the United States Air Force. During that time, he wrote the song "Hey, Porter" which was met with little excitement from the executives at his record label. He was then told to come back with a song that Sun Records owner, Sam Phillips, would be able to sell. Cash went home and wrote the song "Cry! Cry! Cry!" overnight and came back and performed it to Phillips the following day. The song was then coupled with "Hey Porter" and released as the A-side of the record. For the recording of the song, Johnny Cash was backed by "The Tennessee Two", Luther Perkins on guitar and Marshall Grant on bass. The early success of the song led to a featured spot on the Louisiana Hayride Tour and kicked off the career of Johnny Cash in the process. The song sold over 100,000 copies in the southern states alone. Cash then began to tour with Elvis Presley (among other artists from the record business) soon after its release. The song was later included on Cash's first album, 1957's With His Hot and Blue Guitar, one of the first albums released by Sun Records.

== Contents ==
The song is about a man confronting his lover after finding out that she's been cheating on him, saying she will "Cry! Cry! Cry!" when met with the consequences of her actions.

== Appearance in Walk the Line ==
The fact that it was Cash's first successful tune was mentioned several times in the dialogue of the 2005 film, Walk the Line. While it appeared on the film's soundtrack album, it was not performed in the film (two deleted scenes show the Johnny Cash character, as played by Joaquin Phoenix, composing the song in the basement of his house and later listening to it on the radio).

== Covers ==
- "Texas" Bill Strength's cover was released as a single by Capitol in August 1955 in the US, only weeks after the issue of Cash's original, and September 1955 in the UK.
- Marty Stuart released a cover of the song in 1989; his version peaked at number 32 on the Hot Country Singles chart.
- Third Eye Blind covered the song with Merle Haggard.
- Elvis Costello released a cover of the song in 1982 as the B-side to "I'm Your Toy".
- Canadian punk rock band the Flatliners recorded their version for the Johnny Cash tribute album All Aboard: A Tribute to Johnny Cash (released in October 2008).
- Norah Jones covered the song; her version was included on the bonus CD Live at The Living Room, available with the album The Fall (2009) in Japan and in the U.S. through iTunes and Target.
- Ian Hunter covered the song on March 5, 2013 in a live performance at the Teatro Miela in Trieste, Italy, with David Roe, Johnny Cash's former bass player, playing.
- Robbie Fulks covered it for the 2002 album Dressed in Black: A Tribute to Johnny Cash
- The Kings of Nuthin' recorded a cover for the 2004 album Dear Johnny...A Tribute to Cash.
