= Johnny's Blues: A Tribute to Johnny Cash =

Compilation album by Various artists
- Released: 2003
- Genre: Blues
- Label: Northern Blues Music

Various artists chronology
| Kindred Spirits: A Tribute to the Songs of Johnny Cash (2002) | Johnny's Blues: A Tribute to Johnny Cash (2003) | All Aboard: A Tribute to Johnny Cash (2008) |

Johnny's Blues: A Tribute To Johnny Cash is a 2003 compilation album, released by Northern Blues Music, of blues-oriented songs made popular by Johnny Cash, sung by various Canadian and American performers.

== Track listing ==
| No. | Title | Writer(s) | Artist | Length |
|---|---|---|---|---|
| 1. | "Train of Love" | Johnny Cash | Paul Reddick | 4:21 |
| 2. | "Get Rhythm" | Johnny Cash | Clarence "Gatemouth" Brown, Benjy Davis | 3:06 |
| 3. | "Walking the Blues" | Johnny Cash, Robert Lunn | Maria Muldaur | 4:44 |
| 4. | "Rock Island Line" | Lead Belly, Traditional | Chris Thomas King | 2:40 |
| 5. | "I Walk the Line" | Johnny Cash | Garland Jeffreys | 3:11 |
| 6. | "Folsom Prison Blues" | Johnny Cash | Blackie and the Rodeo Kings | 4:36 |
| 7. | "Long Black Veil" | Danny Dill, Marijohn Wilkin | Harry Manx | 4:41 |
| 8. | "Sunday Morning Coming Down" | Kris Kristofferson | Alvin Youngblood Hart | 4:34 |
| 9. | "Frankie's Man" | Johnny Cash | Sleepy LaBeef | 2:27 |
| 10. | "Redemption" | Johnny Cash | Corey Harris | 3:53 |
| 11. | "Send a Picture of Mother" | Johnny Cash | Kevin Breit | 4:18 |
| 12. | "Big River" | Johnny Cash | Colin Linden | 3:23 |
| 13. | "Will the Circle Be Unbroken" | Traditional | Mavis Staples | 2:56 |

== Personnel ==
- Alvin Youngblood Hart - vocals, guitar
- Sleepy LaBeef - vocals, acoustic guitar, electric guitar
- Tom Wilson - vocals, acoustic guitar
- Colin Linden - vocals, electric guitar, mandolin
- Stephen Fearing - vocals, electric guitar
- Chris Thomas King - vocals, 12-string guitar
- Paul Reddick - vocals, harmonica
- Mic Capdevielle - bass voice
- Del Rey - guitar
- Jim Tullio - acoustic guitar, bass guitar, percussion
- Mark Bosch
- Alan Freedman - acoustic guitar
- Kevin Breit - slide guitar, steel guitar, National guitar, mandocello, mandola, mandolin, bass clarinet
- Jim Weider - slide guitar
- Jim Vivian - fiddle
- Tony Cedras - accordion
- Bob Doidge - trumpet
- Richard Bell - piano
- Joe Krown - organ
- Chris Cameron - Wurlitzer organ
- David Roe - upright bass
- David Hyde
- Butch Taylor - bass guitar
- David Direnzo - drums, percussion
- Kevin Tooley
- David Peters
- Jerry Cavanaugh
- Bryan Owings
- Gary Craig - drums
- Darrell Rose - djembe, percussion
- Emily Braden
- Tony Backhouse
- David P. Jackson - background vocals
