= The Mystery of Life =

Studio album by Johnny Cash
- Released: February 19, 1991
- Recorded: September 1986 – September 1990
- Studio: Cowboy Arms (Nashville, Tennessee)
- Genre: Country; country rock; rockabilly
- Length: 30:17
- Label: Mercury
- Producer: Jack Clement

Johnny Cash chronology
The Man in Black 1959-1962 (1991)	The Mystery of Life (1991)	Country Christmas (1991)

Singles from The Mystery of Life
- 1. "Goin' by the Book" Released: August 1990; 2. "The Greatest Cowboy of Them All" Released: November 1990; 3. "The Mystery of Life" Released: March 1991; 4. "Wanted Man" Released: July 1991

The Mystery of Life is the 77th overall album by country singer Johnny Cash, released in 1991, and his last for Mercury Records. The songs featured are culled from both recent sessions and from leftovers from Cash's first Mercury session in 1986 for the album Johnny Cash is Coming to Town.

It includes new recordings of two songs already associated with him from his Sun and Columbia days, "Hey Porter" and "Wanted Man", plus a remake of "The Greatest Cowboy of Them All," which had been recorded for Columbia but released on the non-Columbia release, A Believer Sings the Truth . "I'll Go Somewhere and Sing My Songs Again" is a duet with Tom T. Hall. The album's poor performance on the charts (it peaked at #70) and that of "Goin' by the Book", the only single to chart (at #69), coupled with Cash's unsteady relationship with Mercury, ensured his departure from the label following the album's release. In 2003, the album was re-released with "The Wanderer" from U2's 1993 Island Records album Zooropa as a bonus track. In 2006, "I'm an Easy Rider" and "Beans for Breakfast" were used in the soundtrack to the video game Scarface: The World Is Yours.

According to Cash's 1997 biography, Mercury only pressed 500 copies of the album, biographer Robert Hilburn in Johnny Cash: The Life (2013) dismisses this as an exaggeration on Cash's part.

This was the final new studio album release to feature drummer W.S. "Fluke" Holland, who had been a member of Cash's backing group and featured on almost all of his recordings since the 1950s, as Holland would not participate in the recording sessions for the Johnny Cash Country Christmas or the recordings made for American Recordings, though he would continue to perform with Cash in concert.

Professional ratings
Review scores
Source	Rating
AllMusic	link
Robert Christgau	link
The Rolling Stone Album Guide	3/5 stars

== Track listing ==
No.	Title	Writer(s)	Length
1.	"The Greatest Cowboy of Them All"	Johnny Cash	3:34
2.	"I'm an Easy Rider"	Johnny Cash	2:36
3.	"The Mystery of Life"	Joe Nixon	3:11
4.	"Hey Porter"	Johnny Cash	2:20
5.	"Beans for Breakfast"	Johnny Cash	3:18
6.	"Goin' by the Book"	Butch Chester Lester	3:19
7.	"Wanted Man"	Bob Dylan, Johnny Cash	2:52
8.	"I'll Go Somewhere and Sing My Songs Again" (duet with Tom T. Hall)	Tom T. Hall	3:11
9.	"The Hobo Song"	John Prine	3:32
10.	"Angel and the Badman"	Johnny Cash	2:24
11.	"The Wanderer" (with U2) (bonus track on later pressings)	Bono, Adam Clayton, The Edge, Larry Mullen, Jr.	4:44

== Personnel ==
- Johnny Cash – vocals, acoustic guitar, backing vocals on "The Hobo Song"

=== Additional musicians ===
- Jack Clement – acoustic guitar, dobro, ukulele, backing vocals on "The Hobo Song"
- Mark Howard – acoustic and electric guitar, mandolin
- Marty Stuart – acoustic and electric guitar, mandolin, backing vocals on "Wanted Man" and "The Mystery of Life"
- Jim Soldi – acoustic and electric guitar, backing vocals on "Wanted Man" and "The Mystery of Life"
- Kerry Marx – acoustic and electric guitar
- David R. Ferguson – acoustic guitar, backing vocals on "The Hobo Song"
- W.S. "Fluke" Holland, Kenny Malone, Jody Maphis – drums, percussion
- Roy Huskey, Jr., Steve Logan – acoustic bass
- Jimmy Tittle – electric bass, backing vocals on "Wanted Man" and "The Mystery of Life"
- Jamie Hartford – mandolin, backing vocals on "The Hobo Song"
- Jack Hale Jr. – horns
- Bob Lewin – horns
- Irv Kane – horns, backing vocals on "The Hobo Song"
- Earl Poole Ball – piano
- Joey Miskulin – piano, keyboards, accordion
- Mark O'Connor – fiddle
- Lloyd Green – steel guitar
- Anita Carter – backing vocals on "The Greatest Cowboy of Them All" and "The Hobo Song"
- John Prine, Debra Deklaita, Claude L. Hill, J. Niles Clement, Pat McLaughlin, Bill Maresh, Jam Dant, Cousin Bill Clement, Jay Patten, Suzanne Sherwin, Roberto Bianco – backing vocals on "The Hobo Song"

=== Additional personnel ===
- Produced by Jack Clement
- "The Wanderer" produced by Flood, Brian Eno and The Edge
- Assistant producer: David R. Ferguson
- Executive in charge of production: Harold Shedd
- Executive producers: Claudia Mize, Reba Hancock
- Recording engineers: David R. Ferguson (chief engineer), Richard Adler, Jack "Stack-A-Track" Grochmal, Mark Howard, J. Niles Clement, Cousin Bob Clement
- Mixed by David R. Ferguson
- Assistant mixer: Mark Howard
- Recorded and mixed at the Cowboy Arms Hotel and Recording Spa, Nashville, Tennessee
- Music arrangements: Joey Miskulin
- "Wanted Man" arranged by: Marty Stuart
- Mastered by Benny Quinn at Masterfonics, INC., Nashville, Tennessee
- Album design: Marlene Cohen
- Photography serigraph: Alan Messer
- Executive art director: Kim Markovchick
- Liner notes: June Carter Cash

=== Reissue credits ===
- Produced by Andy McKaie
- Digitally remastered by Suha Gur, UNiversal Mastering-East
- Art direction: Vartan
- Design: Mike Fink @ilevel
- Photo research: Ryan Null
- Photos: Alan Messer
- Production coordination: Beth Stempel

== Charts ==
Album – Billboard (United States)

Chart (1991)	Peak position
Top Country Albums	70

Singles – Billboard (United States)

Year	Single	Peak positions
Year	Single	US Country
1990	"Goin' by the Book"	69
1991	"The Mystery of Life"	–
