= So Doggone Lonesome =

Single by Johnny Cash

from the album Johnny Cash with His Hot and Blue Guitar!
- A-side: "Folsom Prison Blues"
- Released: 15 December 1955
- Recorded: July 30, 1955
- Genre: Country; rockabilly
- Length: 2:35
- Label: Sun
- Songwriter: Johnny Cash
- Producer: Sam Phillips

Johnny Cash singles chronology
"Hey Porter" (1955)	"So Doggone Lonesome" (1955)	"Folsom Prison Blues" (1955)

"So Doggone Lonesome" is a song written and recorded by American country music singer Johnny Cash. He and his band (The Tennessee Two) recorded the song in a studio session at Sun Records studios at 706 Union Avenue in Memphis, Tennessee. The session took place on July 30, 1955, when the trio also recorded "Luther Played The Boogie" (a homage to the group's lead guitarist, Luther Perkins) and "Mean Eyed Cat", the latter of which Cash reprised on his Unchained album for Rick Rubin's American Recordings.

Cash was a great admirer of Ernest Tubb, and wrote "So Doggone Lonesome" with him in mind. Many of Cash's self-penned recordings were written with a certain artist in mind; Cash's song "Get Rhythm" was originally created to be recorded by Elvis Presley.

Legend has it that Tubb heard "So Doggone Lonesome" on the radio, which inspired him to record his own version of the song. Tubb did indeed record "So Doggone Lonesome" and performed it on the Grand Ole Opry, but the inspiration for his decision to do so is unclear. Additionally, Cash is reported to have said he only believed he had truly "made it" as an artist when he heard Tubb singing one of his songs.

== In popular culture ==
Featured in episodes 1 “The End” and 3 “The Head” of the 2024 Fallout TV series released for Amazon Prime Video.

== Chart performance ==
Chart (1955–1956)	Peak position
U.S. Billboard Hot Country Singles	4
