= Cash: The Autobiography =

1997 autobiography of Johnny Cash

- Cover of first edition
- Author: Johnny Cash; Patrick Carr
- Language: English
- Subject: Johnny Cash
- Publisher: Harper San Francisco
- Publication date: 1997
- Publication place: United States
- Media type: Print (hardcover)
- Pages: 310
- ISBN: 0-06-251500-4
- OCLC: 37778630
- Dewey Decimal: 782.421642/092 B
- LC Class: ML420.C265 A3 1997
- Preceded by: Man in Black

Cash: The Autobiography is a 1997 autobiography of Johnny Cash, country musician, written twenty years after his first autobiography, Man in Black. Cash co-wrote this book with country music scene journalist Patrick Carr. Cash's autobiographies were the basis for the biopic Walk the Line in 2005.

== First edition ==
- San Francisco: Harper San Francisco. ISBN 0-06-251500-4

== Reviews ==
- Kirkus Reviews, October 1, 1997.
- Tom Graves (December 21, 1997). "Review: Cash: The Autobiography by Johnny Cash with Patrick Carr". The New York Times Book Review.
