= Dressed in Black =

Dressed in Black may refer to:

- "Dressed in Black", a 2003 episode of the second season of Degrassi: The Next Generation

== Music ==
=== Albums ===
- Dressed in Black: A Tribute to Johnny Cash (2002)
- Dressed In Black, album by Ben Vaughn Enigma Records LP, 1990
- Dressed in Black, album by Eric Paslay 2016

=== Songs ===
- "Dressed in Black", a song by The Shangri-Las from single "He Cried" 1966
- "Dressed in Black", a song by Depeche Mode from Black Celebration 1986
- "Dressed in Black", a song by Sia from album 1000 Forms of Fear 2014
