= Country Christmas =

Country Christmas may refer to:

- Country Christmas (Loretta Lynn album)
- Country Christmas (Johnny Cash album)
