= Dressed in Black: A Tribute to Johnny Cash =

Compilation album by Various artists
- Released: September 17, 2002
- Genre: Country
- Length: 51:11
- Label: Dualtone Music Group

Various artists chronology
Americana: A Tribute to Johnny Cash (2000)	Dressed in Black: A Tribute to Johnny Cash (2002)	Kindred Spirits: A Tribute to the Songs of Johnny Cash (2002)

Dressed in Black: A Tribute to Johnny Cash is, as the title suggests, a tribute album to country singer Johnny Cash, released on the Dualtone label on September 17, 2002. It features several of Cash's most well-known songs, such as "Ring of Fire" and "Folsom Prison Blues", as well as a number of more obscure compositions like "I'm Gonna Sit on the Porch and Pick on My Old Guitar" and "Pack Up Your Sorrows". Various artists contributed cover versions to the album; these include Hank Williams III, The Reverend Horton Heat and Raul Malo, but the focus is primarily on less popular artists, as opposed to Kindred Spirits, the second tribute album released around the same time.

Professional ratings
Review scores
Source	Rating
Allmusic	link

== Track listing ==
No.	Title	Artist	Length
1.	"Wreck of the Old 97"	Hank Williams III	2:58
2.	"Cry! Cry! Cry!"	Robbie Fulks	2:39
3.	"Ballad of a Teenage Queen"	Rodney Crowell	3:11
4.	"I Guess Things Happen That Way"	Raul Malo	3:07
5.	"There You Go"	Chuck Mead	2:18
6.	"Get Rhythm"	The Reverend Horton Heat	2:29
7.	"Pack Up Your Sorrows"	Bruce Robison and Kelly Willis	2:27
8.	"Ring of Fire"	Billy Burnette	3:49
9.	"Luther Played the Boogie"	Redd Volkaert	2:16
10.	"Big River"	Rosie Flores	2:36
11.	"Folsom Prison Blues"	James Intveld	3:09
12.	"I Still Miss Someone"	Earl Poole Ball	2:51
13.	"I'm Gonna Sit on the Porch and Pick on My Old Guitar"	Damon Bramblett	2:43
14.	"I Walk the Line"	Dale Watson	2:54
15.	"Train of Love"	Kenny Vaughan	3:38
16.	"Straight A's in Love"	Eddie Angel	2:08
17.	"Jackson"	Mandy Barnett and Chuck Mead	2:51
18.	"Flesh and Blood"	Chris Knight	3:07

== Personnel ==
- Mandy Barnett, Kelly Willis - vocals
- Rodney Crowell, Robbie Fulks, Chris Knight, Bruce Robison, Hank Williams III - vocals, acoustic guitar
- Eddie Angel, Billy Burnette, Rosie Flores, James Intveld, Raul Malo, Redd Volkaert - vocals, electric guitar
- Chuck Mead - vocals, acoustic and electric guitar, producer, guitar effects
- Dale Watson - vocals, guitar
- Earl Poole Ball - vocals, piano
- David Roe - vocals, acoustic bass, producer
- Billy Block - vocals, drums
- Damon Bramblett - acoustic guitar
- Kenny Vaughan - acoustic and electric guitar
- Ken Coomer, Al Esis, W.S. Holland, Jimmy Lester, Tom Lewis, Jerry Roe, Maxwell Schauf, Shaw Wilson - drums
- Tammy Rogers - viola

=== Additional personnel ===
- Paul Gannon - engineer
- Hank Williams - mastering
- Gina R. Binkley - design
- Johnny Cash - liner notes

== Chart performance ==
Chart (2002)	Peak position
U.S. Billboard Top Country Albums	53
