= Country Christmas (Johnny Cash album) =

Studio album by Johnny Cash with June Carter and Carter Family
- Released: September 20, 1991
- Recorded: June–August 1991
- Genres: Christmas; country
- Label: Delta Records
- Producer: Ralph Jungheim

Johnny Cash chronology
The Mystery of Life (1991)	Country Christmas (1991)	Patriot (1991)

Country Christmas is the 1991 Christmas album released by American country singer Johnny Cash. The album features traditional Christmas classics such as "Silent Night", "Blue Christmas", and "Joy to the World", sung by Cash and his wife June Carter and The Carter Family.

It is the fourth Christmas album and 78th overall album by Cash, released on Laserlight Digital (see 1991 in music), in between Cash's contracts with Mercury Records and American Recordings.

== Personnel ==
- Johnny Cash – Vocals, Guitar
- June Carter – Vocals
- Carter Family – Vocals
- Jack Hale Jr. & His Nashville All-Star Band & Singers – Vocals, Instruments. Hale is also credited as arranger on all of the traditional Christmas songs

== Track listing ==
=== 15-track version ===
No.	Title	Length
1.	"Blue Christmas"	3:05
2.	"Silent Night"	3:26
3.	"White Christmas"	3:48
4.	"Figgy Pudding" (June Carter Cash and the Carter Family)	2:43
5.	"Here Was a Man"	2:44
6.	"Joy to the World"	3:42
7.	"O Little Town of Bethlehem"	4:16
8.	"What Child Is This?"	4:12
9.	"The First Noel" (June Carter Cash and the Carter Family)	3:26
10.	"Away in a Manger"	3:33
11.	"O Christmas Tree" (June Carter Cash and the Carter Family)	3:18
12.	"O Come All Ye Faithful"	3:59
13.	"It Came Upon The Midnight Clear" (June Carter Cash and the Carter Family)	3:52
14.	"Hark! The Herald Angels Sing"	3:14
15.	"I'll Be Home for Christmas"	4:12

=== 13-track version ===
No.	Title	Length
1.	"Blue Christmas"	3:05
2.	"Silent Night"	3:26
3.	"Figgy Pudding" (June Carter Cash and the Carter Family)	2:43
4.	"Here Was a Man"	2:44
5.	"Joy to the World"	3:42
6.	"O Little Town of Bethlehem"	4:16
7.	"What Child Is This?"	4:12
8.	"The First Noel" (June Carter Cash and the Carter Family)	3:26
9.	"Away in a Manger"	3:33
10.	"O Christmas Tree" (June Carter Cash and the Carter Family)	3:18
11.	"O Come All Ye Faithful"	3:59
12.	"It Came Upon The Midnight Clear" (June Carter Cash and the Carter Family)	3:52
13.	"Hark! The Herald Angels Sing"	3:14

=== 2006 reissue ===
1. "Silent Night"
2. "It Came Upon The Midnight Clear"
3. "Here Was A Man"
4. "Blue Christmas"
5. "What Child is This?"
6. "Joy To The World"
7. "Ring Of Fire"
8. "O Christmas Tree"
9. "Away In A Manger"
10. "Hark! The Herald Angels Sing"
11. "O Come All Ye Faithful"
12. "I Walk The Line"
13. "Figgy Pudding"
14. "O Little Town Of Bethlehem"
15. "The First Noel"

== Reception ==
In 1991, the San Antonio Light recommended Johnny Cash's Country Christmas for "the very traditional country music lover". In 2006, John Harris wrote in The Guardian that the album was "all right for a laugh, but once you've heard [Cash] sing something called Figgy Puddin', the joke's pretty much over".
