= Goin' by the Book =

Song by Johnny Cash

Single by Johnny Cash

from the album The Mystery of Life
- B-side: "Beans for Breakfast"
- Released: 1990
- Genre: Country, rock
- Label: Mercury 878 292-7
- Songwriter: Chester Lester
- Producer: Jack Clement

Johnny Cash singles chronology
"Cat's in the Cradle" (1990)	"Goin' by the Book" (1990)	"The Mystery of Life" (1991)

Music video
- "Goin' by the Book" on YouTube

"Goin' by the Book" is a song written by Chester Lester and initially recorded by Johnny Cash in 1986.

Released in the second half of 1990 as a single (Mercury 878 292–7, with "Beans for Breakfast" on the B-side), the song reached number 69 on U.S. Billboard's country chart for the week of October 13.

The song is part of Cash's Jack Clement–produced album The Mystery of Life, that appeared in 1991.

== Background ==
Nineteen ninety saw the beginning of the first Gulf War, and in response, Cash pulled out a song that he had recorded four years earlier, "Goin' by the Book," which ties current events to biblical prophecy. It was released as a single at the end of the year, accompanied by a video assembled from news footage and shots of Cash standing, accompanied by a lone guitarist, in a darkened room. Nonetheless, the song spent only four weeks on the chart, peaking at #69.

—C. Eric Banister. Johnny Cash FAQ: All That's Left to Know About the Man in Black

== Track listing ==
7" single (Mercury 878 292-7, 1989)
No.	Title	Writer(s)	Length
1.	"Goin' by the Book"	C. Lester	3:19
2.	"Beans for Breakfast"	J. R. Cash	3:17

== Charts ==
Chart (1990)	Peak position
US Hot Country Songs (Billboard)	69
