= West Eats Meet =

west eats meet

Studio album by Harry Manx
- Released: 2004
- Genre: Folk/Hindustani
- Length: 43:54
- Label: DogMyCat

Harry Manx chronology
Road Ragas (2003)	west eats meet (2004)	mantras for madmen (2005)

West Eats Meet (styled west eats meet) is an album released in 2004 by Canadian folk music artist Harry Manx.

== Track listing ==
1. "Help Me" – 3:11
2. "Make Way for the Living" – 4:26
3. "Shadow of the Whip" – 3:29
4. "The Great Unknown" – 4:07
5. "Forgive & Remember" – 3:38
6. "Sittin' on Top of the World" – 3:29
7. "That Knowing Look of Fate" – 3:36
8. "Stir a Little Breeze" – 3:28
9. "Tough & Tender" – 4:07
10. "The Ways of Love" - 4:33
11. "Something of Your Grace" - 3:35
12. "Hector's Song" - 2:15
