= Harry Manx =

Canadian musician (born 1955)

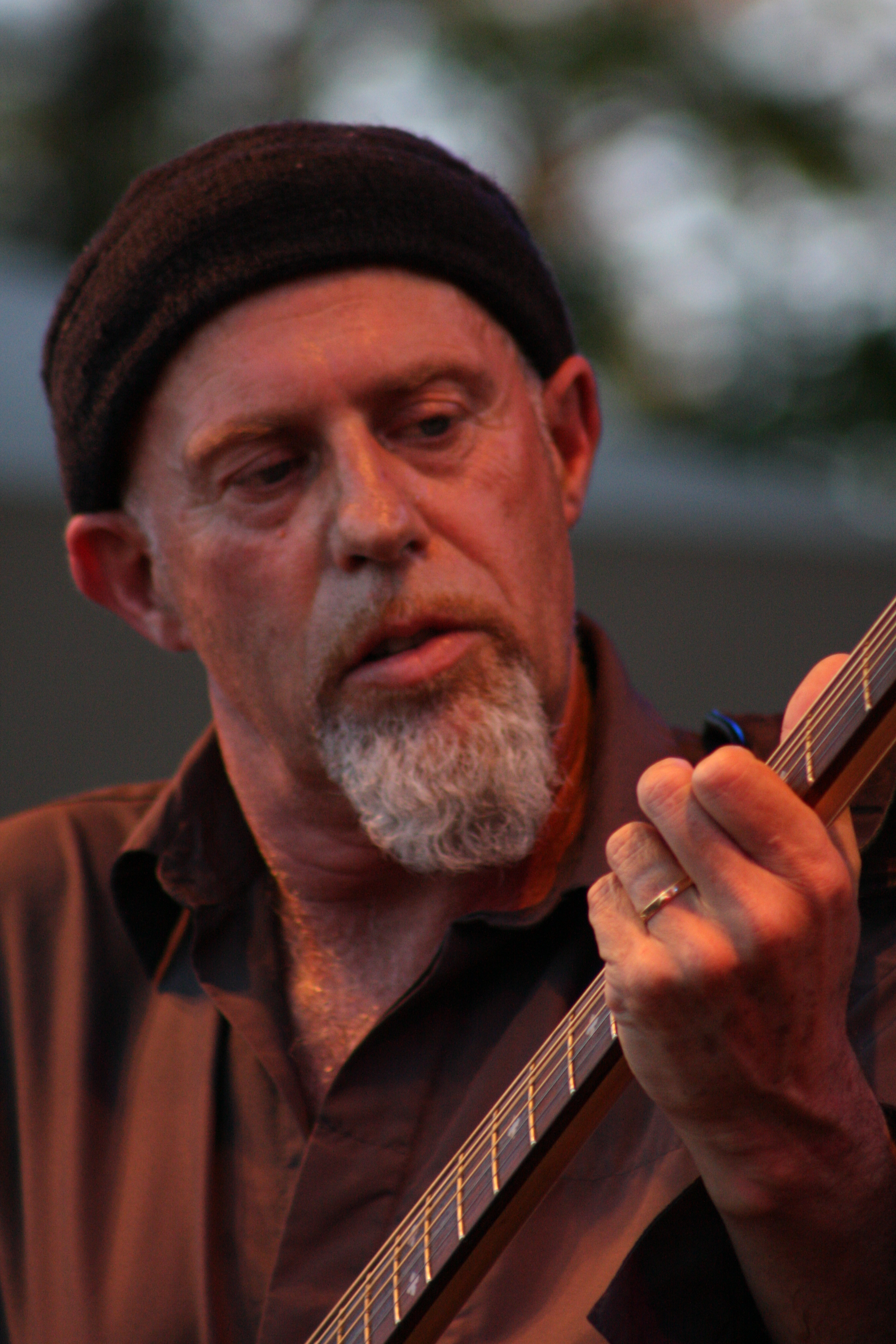
- Manx in 2008

Background information
- Born: 1955 (age 70–71); Douglas, Isle of Man
- Genres: Blues; folk; Hindustani classical music
- Instruments: Guitar; harmonica; banjo; Mohan veena
- Label: Dog My Cat Records
- Website: harrymanx.com

Harry Manx (born 1955) is a Canadian musician who blends blues, folk music, and Hindustani classical music. Manx plays guitar, banjo, harmonica, and mohan veena, studying on the latter instrument with its inventor, Vishwa Mohan Bhatt. He releases his work on his own label, Dog My Cats Records.

Manx has received seven Maple Blues Awards, six Juno nominations, the Canadian Folk Music Award in 2005 for Best Solo Artist, and CBC Radio's "Great Canadian Blues Award" in 2007.

== Early life ==
Manx was born in Douglas, Isle of Man, the son of a Scottish merchant marine father and a Manx mother. The family moved to Sutton, Ontario, Canada in 1962. Manx started working as a roadie at age fifteen and later became a sound man at the El Mocambo club in Toronto.

== Career ==
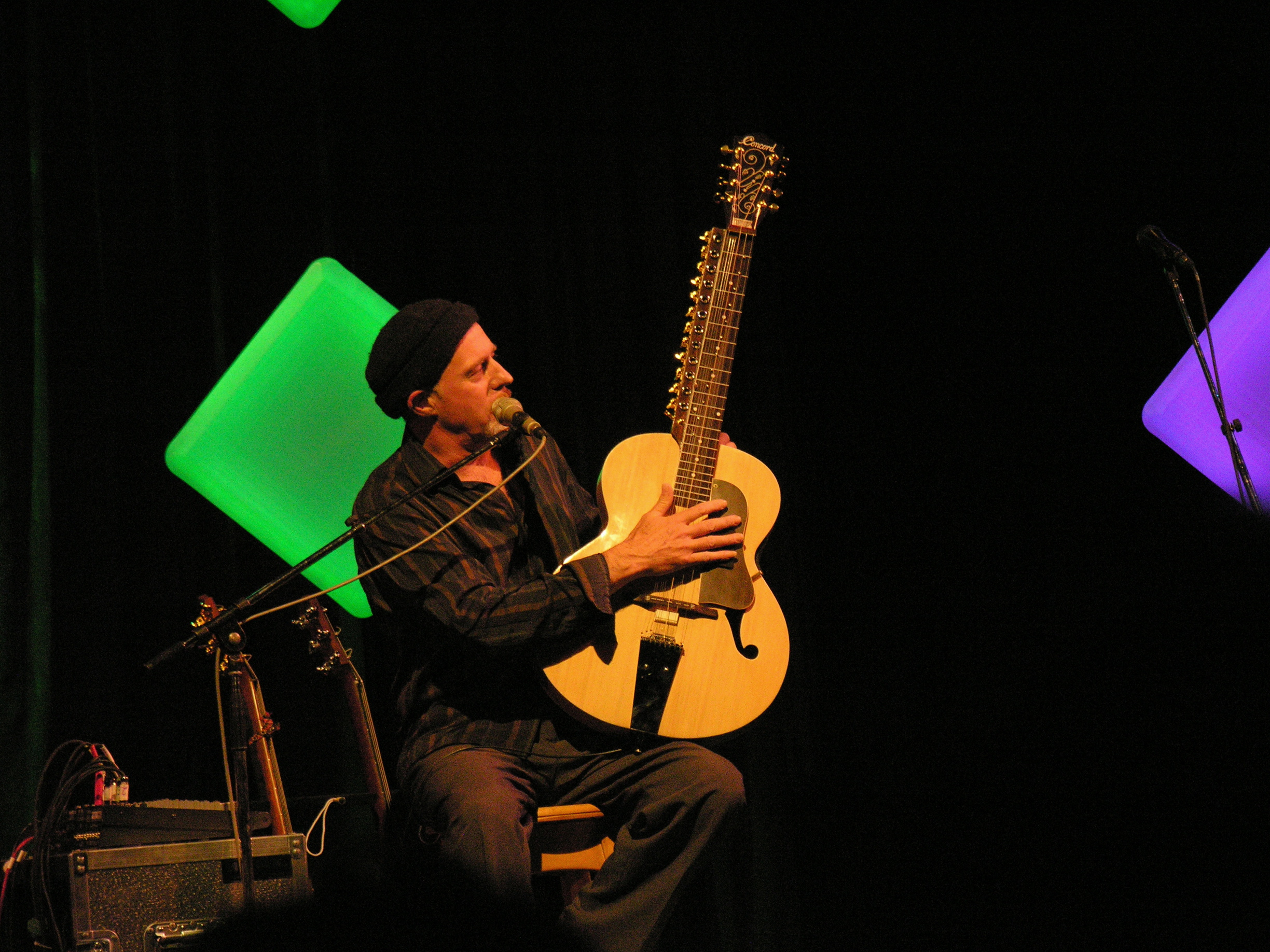
Manx explaining his mohan veena to an audience

Manx left Toronto to busk in Europe in the late 1970s, also finding work at festivals as a guitarist. He then moved to Japan, where he lived and performed for ten years. In 1990, while Manx was in Japan, he heard a recording of the Indian slide guitarist Vishwa Mohan Bhatt, subsequently leaving to study under Bhatt in India for five years.

In 2000, Manx moved back to Canada and set up residence in Saltspring Island, British Columbia, recording his debut album at the Barn Studios, featuring his one-man-band sound on lap slide guitar, mohan veena, harmonica, and vocals. All of his albums have been released under the adopted stage surname "Manx." Manx is a longtime collaborator with Canadian guitarist Kevin Breit and Australian keyboardist Clayton Doley.

== Personal life ==
Manx and his wife Najma have a son together.

== Discography ==
- Dog My Cat (2001)
- Wise and Otherwise (2002)
- Jubilee (with Kevin Breit) (2003)
- Road Ragas (2003)
- West Eats Meet (2004)
- Mantras for Madmen (2005)
- In Good We Trust (with Kevin Breit) (2007)
- Live at the Glenn Gould Studio (2008)
- Bread and Buddha (2009)
- Isle of Manx (2010)
- Strictly Whatever (with Kevin Breit) (2011)
- Om Suite Ohm (2013)
- 20 Strings and the Truth (2014)
- Faith Lift (2017)
- Way Out East (2022)

=== Compilation appearances ===
- Johnny's Blues: A Tribute To Johnny Cash (Northern Blues, 2003)
- Beautiful (A Tribute to Gordon Lightfoot) (Borealis Records, 2003)
- Saturday Night Blues: 20 Years (CBC, 2006)
- Isle of Manx: The Desert Island Collection (2010)
