= Sleepy LaBeef =

American musician (1935–2019)

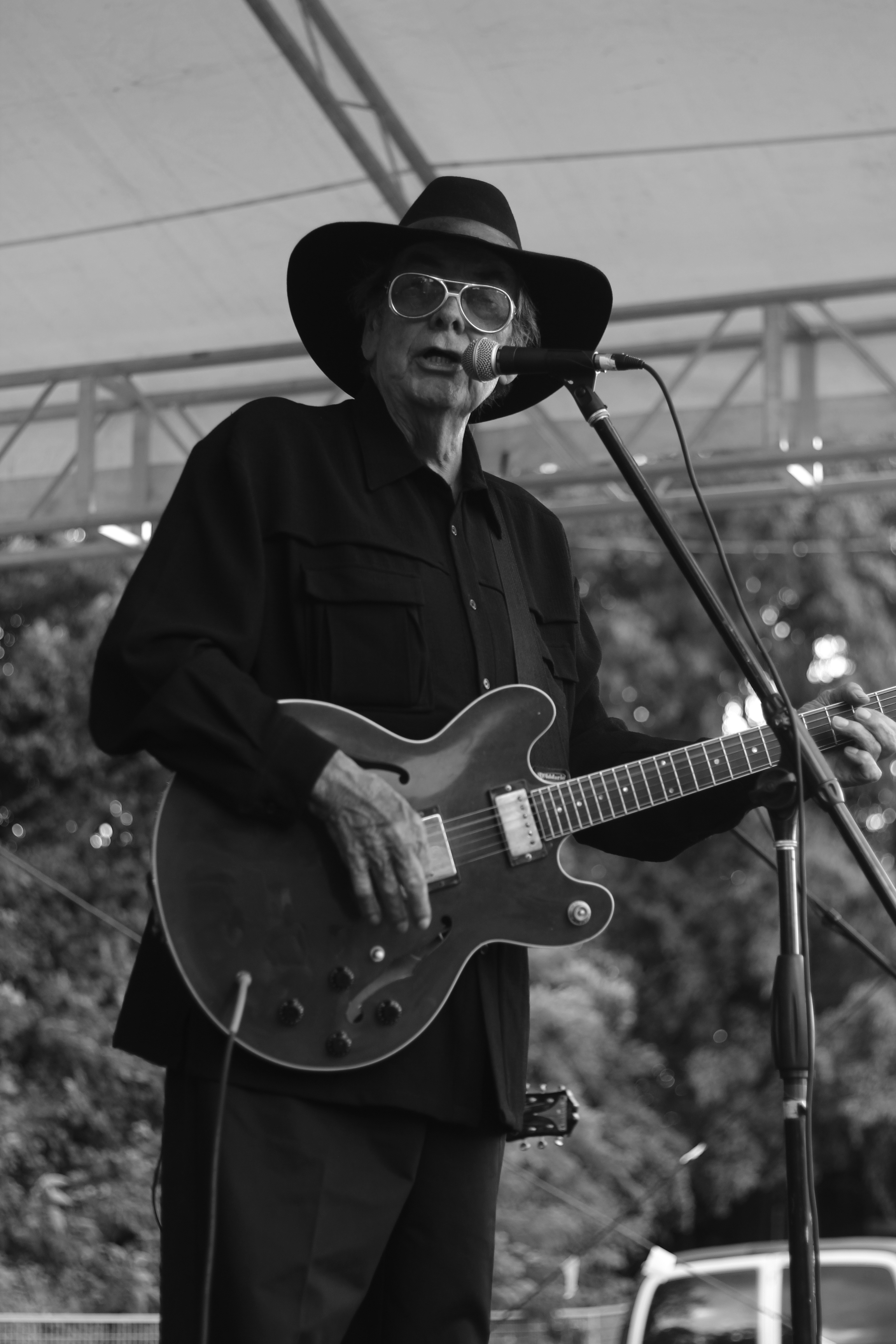
- LaBeef performing at the Memphis International Rockabilly Festival, August 2015

Background information
- Also known as: Tommy LaBeff
- Born: Thomas Paulsley LaBeff; July 20, 1935; Smackover, Arkansas, U.S.
- Died: December 26, 2019 (aged 84) Siloam Springs, Arkansas, U.S.
- Genres: Rockabilly; rock and roll; blues; gospel; country
- Occupation: Musician
- Instruments: Vocals; Guitar
- Years active: 1954–2019
- Labels: Starday, Columbia, Plantation, Sun, Charly, Rounder

Thomas Paulsley LaBeff (July 20, 1935 – December 26, 2019), known professionally as Sleepy LaBeef, was an American rockabilly musician.

== Early life ==
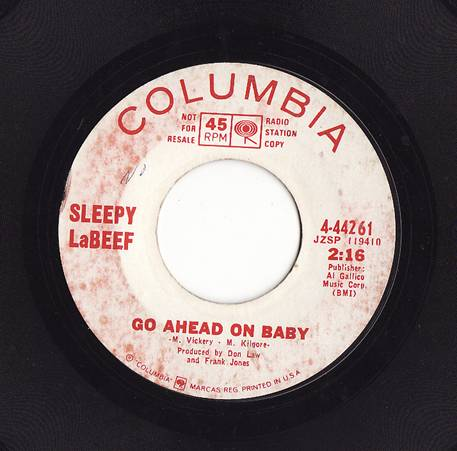
"Go Ahead on Baby" by Sleepy LaBeef, Columbia late 1960s

LaBeef was born in Smackover, Arkansas, the youngest of 10 children. The family name was originally LaBoeuf. He was raised on a farm growing cotton and watermelons, and received the nickname "Sleepy" because he had a lazy eye.

LaBeef became a fan of George Jones, Bill Monroe, and Sister Rosetta Tharpe. He learned guitar, and moved to Houston, Texas, when he was 18. There, he sang gospel music on local radio and put together a bar band to play venues as well as radio programs such as the Houston Jamboree and Louisiana Hayride. LaBeef stood 6 ft 6 in (198 cm) tall.

== Career ==
LaBeef began recording rockabilly singles In the 1950s, initially credited as Sleepy LaBeff or Tommy LaBeff. His first, "I'm Through", was issued on Starday Records in 1957.

In 1964, he moved to Nashville and moved to a more solidly country style, recording singles for Columbia Records. His first genuine hit was 1968's "Every Day", which peaked at No. 73 on the U.S. Billboard Country chart. After moving to Plantation Records in 1969, he scored a second hit in 1971 with "Blackland Farmer", which charted at No. 67. He also played the role of the Swamp Thing in Ron Ormond's 1968 B-movie, The Exotic Ones (also known as The Monster and the Stripper).

LaBeef transferred to Sun Records in the 1970s and continued releasing albums and touring widely; his popularity faded in the United States but rose in Europe. The 1980s saw him sign to Rounder Records, where he released albums into the 1990s.

As a musician, he was noted for his extensive repertoire, and for his live performances, at one time undertaking some 300 performances a year. He described the music he performed as "root music: old-time rock-and-roll, Southern gospel and hand-clapping music, black blues, Hank Williams-style country. We mix it up real good." He toured regularly in Europe, and performed at many music festivals both in Europe and the US. In January 2012, LaBeef traveled to Nashville to record and film a live concert and record in historic RCA Studio B, all produced by noted bassist Dave Pomeroy. A documentary/concert DVD, Sleepy LaBeef Rides Again and the soundtrack CD was released on April 22, 2013, by Earwave Records. His last performance was in September 2019.

He had heart bypass surgery in 2003. He died at his home in Siloam Springs, Arkansas on December 26, 2019, at age 84.

== Discography ==
=== Singles ===
Year	Title	Record label
1957	"I’m Through" / "All Alone"	Starday Records
1957	"I’m Through" / "All Alone"	Starday-Mercury Records
1957	"All The Time" / "Lonely"	Starday-Mercury Records
1958	"Ballad Of A Teenage Queen" / "Eskimo Pie"	Dixie Records
1958	"Oh, Oh, I’m Falling In Love Again" / "One Week Later"	Dixie Records
1960	"Found Out" / "Can’t Get You Out Of My Mind"	Gulf Records Records
1961	"Turn Me Loose" / "Ridin’ Fence"	Crescent Records
1962	"Ride On Josephine" / "Walkin’ Slowly"	Wayside Records
1963	"Tore Up" / "Lonely"	Wayside Records
1963	"Drink Up And Go Home" / "Teardrops On A Rose"	Finn Records
1963	"Ride On Josephine" / "Lonely"	Picture Records
1965	"You Can’t Catch Me" / "Everybody’s Got To Have Somebody"	Columbia Records
1966	"A Man In My Position" / "Drinking Again"	Columbia Records
1966	"I’m Too Broke" / "I Feel A Lot More Like I Do Now"	Columbia Records
1961	"Ballad Of A Teenage Queen" / "The Ways Of A Woman In Love"	Columbia Records
1969	"Blackland Farmer" / ?	Columbia Records
—	"Baby, Let’s Play House"; "Don’t Make Me Go"; "Somebody’s Been Beating My Time"; "I Ain’t Gonna Take It"; "Little Bit More"; "Shame, Shame, Shame"	not issued

=== Albums ===
- 1974: The Bull’s Night Out
- 1976: Western Gold
- 1978: Rockabilly 1977 (Sun Records)
- 1978: Beefy Rockabilly
- 1979: Early, Rare and Rockin’ Sides
- 1979: Downhome Rockabilly (Sun Records)
- 1979: Downhome Rockabilly (Charly Records, UK)
- 1979: Rockabilly Heavyweight (with Dave Travis)
- 1979 "Sleepin' in Spain" (AUVI records, Spain)
- 1979: Sleepy LaBeef and Friends (Ace Records)
- 1979: Sleepy LaBeef and Friends (Ace-Chiswick Records)
- 1980: Early, Rare and Rockin’ Sides (re-release)
- 1980: Downhome Rockabilly (re-release)
- 1981: It Ain’t What You Eat, It's the Way How You Chew It (Rounder Records)
- 1982: Electricity (Rounder Records)
- 1987: Nothin’ But The Truth (Rounder Records) [live]
- 1994: Strange Things Happen
- 1995: The Human Jukebox (Rounder Records)
- 1996: I’ll Never Lay My Guitar Down (Rounder Records)
- 1996: Larger Than Life (6 CD-Box, compilation)
- 1997: A Rockin’ Decade
- 1999: Flyin’ Saucer Rock’n’Roll: The Very Best Of Sleepy LaBeef
- 1999: The Bulls’s Ride Out & Western Gold
- 2000: Tomorrow Never Comes
- 2001: Rockabilly Blues
- 2001: Road Warrior
- 2003: Johnny's Blues: A Tribute To Johnny Cash (Northern Blues)
- 2008: Roots (Ponk Media)
- 2008: Sleepy Rocks (Bear Family anthology)
- 2012: Rides Again
