= Biggest Hits =

Compilation album by Johnny Cash
- Released: 1984
- Genre: Country; folk; blues
- Label: Columbia

Johnny Cash chronology
Koncert v Praze (In Prague–Live) (1983)	Biggest Hits (1984)	Highwayman (1985)

Professional ratings
Review scores
Source	Rating
Allmusic	2.5/5 stars

Biggest Hits is a compilation album by country singer Johnny Cash released in 1984 on Columbia Records, consisting of previously released recordings.

== Track listing ==
1. "The Baron"
2. "The Ballad of Ira Hayes"
3. "It'll Be Her"
4. "Flesh and Blood"
5. "Mobile Bay"
6. "A Boy Named Sue"
7. "The L & N Don't Stop Here Anymore"
8. "Bull Rider"
9. "Last Time"
10. "Reverend Mr. Black"
