= The Wanderer (U2 song) =

Song by U2 starring Johnny Cash

from the album Zooropa
- Released: 5 July 1993
- Recorded: March–May 1993
- Genre: Electronic rock
- Length: 5:41
- Label: Island
- Composer: U2
- Lyricist: Bono
- Producers: Flood; Brian Eno; The Edge

"The Wanderer" is a song by Irish rock band U2, and the tenth and final track from their 1993 studio album, Zooropa. It is one of the few U2 songs without Bono on lead vocals, instead featuring country singer Johnny Cash. Based on the Old Testament's Book of Ecclesiastes and its narrator "The Preacher", the song lyrically describes the narrator wandering through a post-apocalyptic world "in search of experience", sampling all facets of human culture and hoping to find meaning in life. Cash's haggard voice is juxtaposed against a synthesised bassline and mostly electronic instrumentation.

== Background ==
Cash recorded the vocals for the song in Dublin in February 1993 during the Zooropa sessions. The song underwent several provisional titles, including "The Preacher" and "Wandering". Producer Brian Eno tried to get Bono to sing the song, but Bono maintained it was Cash's voice he imagined singing the song. Bono and Cash had previously worked on a song called "Ellis Island".

== Composition ==
"So, what happened was he sang it through loads and loads of times and they tried to put together a vocal that felt in keeping with the music, but it never quite seemed to connect. Bono said to me, when I came back, "Do you want to have a go at trying to put the vocal together?" So I decided to try and do the opposite of what everyone had done, which was to make a completely cold, dispassionate-sounding Johnny Cash. Almost like he's Johnny Cash the robot. It took quite a lot of time to eliminate all feeling from it, but in a way that helped marry it to the music. So there's this somebody who's completely dispassionate and because I wasn't there during the recording, I had no emotional attachment to any of the performances. I had no idea what had gone into making them, so I could be completely removed from the whole process. And then Bono heard it and went "Perfect!" He did backing vocals and we moved a couple of things around, but what he heard was what he wanted for the song."

—Flood, on the recording of the song.

The lyrics describe a man searching for God in a post-Apocalyptic world. He expresses concern over society's diminished view of Jesus Christ; "They say they want the Kingdom but they don't want God in it." There is little guitar from the Edge, and Adam Clayton's synthesised bassline is the prominent musical sound throughout the song. However, Larry Mullen's soft drumbeats can be heard. It is one of the few songs not to be sung by Bono, but he does provide a brief falsetto vocal towards the song's ending.

In an interview, Flood, one of the song's producers, singled out "The Wanderer" as one of Zooropa's highlights; "For me, that's a great song and it translates emotionally brilliantly, yet there's a load of sonic experiments going on there. There's the idea of this person sort of wandering through this desolate landscape, but there's an air of nonchalance. Everything about the lyric, the delivery, the sound of his voice, the music -- it just seems fantastic. It delivers on all levels".

At the end of the song (on most versions of Zooropa), there are 30 seconds of silence (4:45–5:15). Following this, an alarm-sound fades in at 5:15. The alarm sound repeats, even once it has completely started (at about 5:20). The alarm sound finishes at 5:41. Apparently, this is the same sound some DJs hear after 10 seconds of dead air on the radio.

== Live performances ==
Johnny Cash performed "The Wanderer" on at least one occasion at the Nevada County fairgrounds in Grass Valley, California, in August 1993. U2 played it in a television special entitled I Walk the Line: A Night for Johnny Cash, following Cash's death in 2003. Bono performed the song in a similar fashion to Cash's rendition, with The Edge adding dramatic falsetto background vocals that were not on the original recording. On 2 July 2011, U2 performed an extended snippet of the song, running for two verses, in Nashville, Tennessee as a part of their U2 360° Tour. Bono explained to the audience they chose to play the song in Nashville as a tribute to Cash and his wife June.

"The Wanderer" was used as the intermission song during U2's 2015 Innocence + Experience Tour.

An extended version of the song including an extra verse is included on the soundtrack to the film Faraway, So Close! The extended version is 5:16 in length. The song was included on the Johnny Cash compilations, The Essential Johnny Cash (Legacy/Columbia, 2002) and The Legend of Johnny Cash (American/Island, 2005) and The Legend.

== Reception ==
According to William Richey and Kevin J.H. Dettmar, U2 "skillfully exploited the image of Johnny Cash in a... provocative way", clarifying that "they seemingly imbue their vision of a postapocalyptic wasteland with a deeper sense of poignance and sincerity because Cash's storied voice is associated in the public mind with a man whose very public struggles with drugs, alcohol, and love prove that he has 'walked the line'."

Other reviews of the song have been mixed. In Spin's 20th anniversary review of Zooropa, Rob Harvilla described "The Wanderer" as being "... monumentally incongruous and gets a little sassy about the separation of church and state." The A.V. Club's Annie Zaleski described it as "surprisingly shapeless, despite faint bass twang, sighing background vocals, and minimal drums."

== Personnel ==
Taken from Zooropa CD booklet, and Sound on Sound.

U2

- Bono – guitar, backing vocals (outro)
- The Edge – guitar, synthesizers, backing vocals
- Adam Clayton – bass guitar
- Larry Mullen Jr. – drums, percussion

Additional musicians

- Johnny Cash – lead vocals
- Brian Eno – synthesizers, loops
- Flood – loops

Production

- Flood – production, mixing, engineering
- Brian Eno – production
- The Edge – production
- Robbie Adams – engineering, mixing
- Willie Mannion – engineering assistance, mixing assistance
- Arnie Acosta – mastering
