= Bob Wootton =

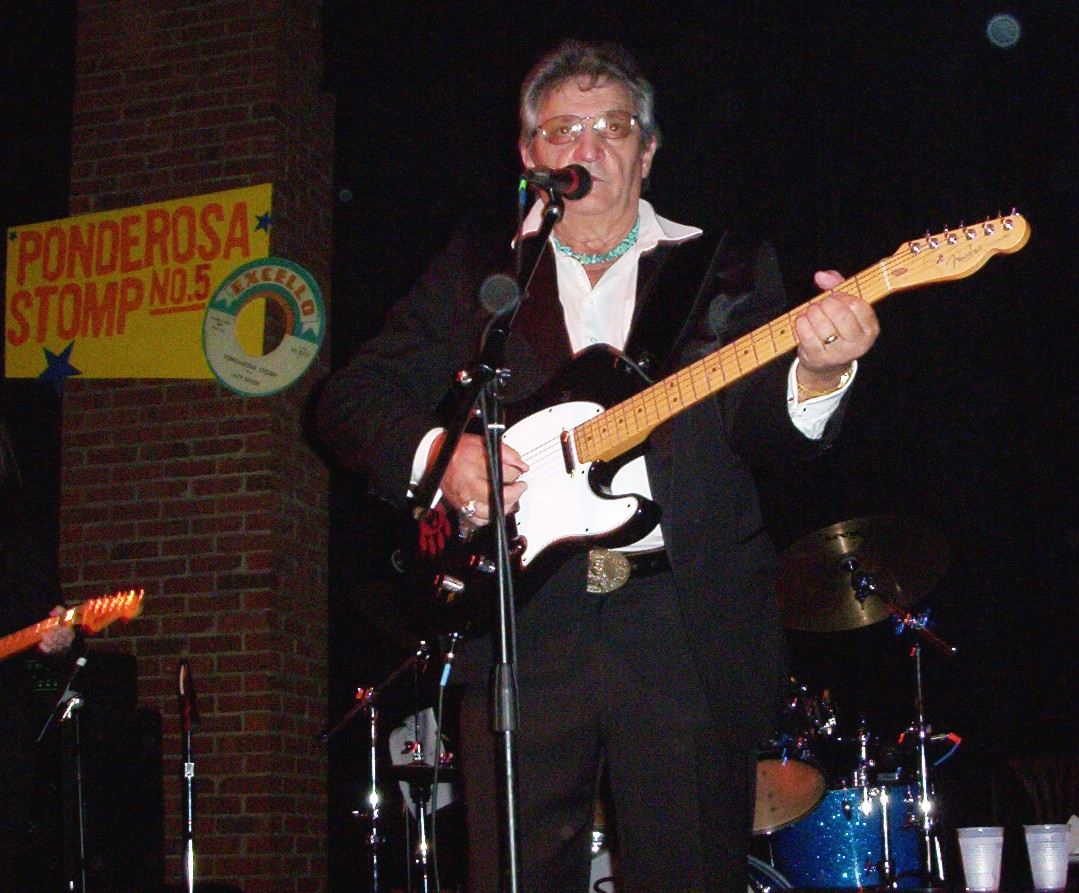
- Wootton performing in 2006

Background information
- Born: Robert Clifton Wootton; March 4, 1942; Paris, Arkansas, U.S.
- Died: April 9, 2017 (aged 75) Gallatin, Tennessee, U.S.
- Genres: Country, rock and roll, rockabilly, blues
- Occupation: Musician
- Instrument: Guitar
- Years active: 1968–2017
- Formerly of: The Tennessee Three

Robert Clifton Wootton (March 4, 1942 – April 9, 2017) was an American guitarist. He joined Johnny Cash's backing band, The Tennessee Three, after original lead guitarist Luther Perkins died in a house fire. He remained Cash's guitarist for nearly thirty years.

== Biography ==
Robert Clifton Wootton was born March 4, 1942, in Paris, Arkansas to coal miner Rubin Calvin Wootton, and his wife Noma Moore. In 1950, he moved with his family to Taft, California. He first learned to play guitar from his father around age 11. It was around this time that he said he first heard the music of Johnny Cash, which he "instantly loved". In 1956, he bought a copy of "I Walk the Line", even though he did not then own a record player. In 1958, Wootton moved to Oklahoma, where he lived until joining Cash's band.

In 1961, Wootton joined the U.S army, and served for 3 years, including 15 months in Korea.

Wootton had been a lifelong fan of Cash's and played his songs religiously until he had perfected the boom-chicka-boom style known as Cash's unique sound. By 1968, Wootton was playing gigs regularly in Oklahoma City. After the death of Luther Perkins in a house fire in August 1968, the role of lead guitarist was given to Carl Perkins (no relation) leading to a different sound of the band. On September 17, 1968, Cash was performing in Fayetteville, Arkansas, at a campaign rally for Governor Winthrop Rockefeller. An airline delay left only Johnny Cash and drummer W. S. Holland onstage. Wootton 's girlfriend approached June Carter with saying that her boyfriend knew the parts. Carter pressed Cash to have a look at it and he agreed. Wootton stunned the crowd, particularly Cash himself, with perfect renditions of every song. Cash mentioned in passing that he might one day call on Wootton again, but within days asked him to join the tour as new lead guitarist.

On Cash's live album recorded at San Quentin State Prison, Wootton stood on such tracks as "I Walk the Line" and "Folsom Prison Blues", where he played leading parts. Wootton continued in the band with only a brief respite until Cash retired from active touring in 1997.

With Cash's retirement from the stage, Wootton was willing to take non-musician work to earn a living. He worked as a tour bus driver, including a stint for the Smashing Pumpkins. Wootton did not participate in the recording sessions that became known as Cash's American Recordings albums. From 2006 to 2007, Wootton performed with Cash's original drummer, W. S. Holland, his wife Vicky Wootton, and his daughter Scarlett Wootton as The Tennessee Three. In 2006 the band released their first album since Cash's death, a tribute titled The Sound Must Go On.

The Tennessee Three was scheduled to perform at Folsom Prison in January 2008 to commemorate the 40th anniversary of Cash's Folsom show. Wootton eventually withdrew from the concert project, which was later scrapped following disputes between prison officials and show promoters. Wootton continued his 2008 touring as the Tennessee Three with drummer Rodney Blake Powell, Vicky, Scarlett, and Montana Wootton to crowds in several countries. The band continued to tour throughout 2009.

Wootton died of dementia on April 9, 2017, in Gallatin, Tennessee, at the age of 75.
