= Man in Black: His Own Story in His Own Words =

1975 autobiography by Johnny Cash

- First edition (publ. Zondervan)
- Author: Johnny Cash
- Publication date: 1975
- ISBN: 9780310223221

Man in Black: His Own Story in His Own Words is a 1975 autobiography by country musician Johnny Cash. It served as part of the basis for the 2005 film Walk the Line.

== First edition ==
- Grand Rapids: Zondervan, 1975. ISBN 99924-31-58-X
