= Micro-Frets =

American musical instruments manufacturing company

- Type: Private
- Industry: Musical instruments
- Founded: 1967
- Founder: Ralph Jones Sr.
- Defunct: 1975 (re-introduced 2017)
- Headquarters: Frederick, Maryland, United States
- Area served: United States
- Products: Electric guitars
- Website: microfretsguitars.com

Micro-Frets is an American musical instruments manufacturing company established by Ralph Jones Sr. in Frederick, Maryland. The company produced electric guitars and basses until its factory closed in 1975.

In 2017 after many years of hiatus, Micro-Frets returned to production. The company currently produces electric guitars only.

== History ==
The company was founded by Ralph Jones in 1967, originally under the name "Micro Tech". Jones and a small group of builders set up in a 15,000-square-foot factory financed by business partner Francis Marion Huggins on Grove Road. Apart from cutting guitar bodies and necks, they also machined components including the company's Micro-Nut and Calibrato tailpiece. The first four models of guitars introduced that same year were the "Orbiter", "Huntington", "Plainsman" and "Covington", with bass guitars models added later.

The guitars combined unique body shapes and idiosyncratic color schemes with proprietary technology such as the Calibrato vibrato, adjustable nut for intonation, and even an early wireless transmitter they also made things like lighters and many other things Between 1967 and 1974 roughly 3,000 were made. In April 1972, Jones died from a heart attack. Huggins his business partner shortly after his death started a court case for the copyrights and patents that micro frets owned. after Mr. jones death the jones family struggled financially and couldn't afford a lawyer but thanks to the jones previous generosity a lawyer came in and helped the family free of charge. the case ended with Mr. Huggins at a loss of words because of the evidence against him.

The company was briefly revived in 2004 when Will Meadors bought the "Micro-Frets" name with the purpose of relaunching the brand, although it was just to make a small run of guitars. In 2017, 50 years after the company was created, Micro Frets went back into production, with an initial launch of four models: Spacetone, Swinger, Stage II and Signature.

== Artists ==
Today Micro Frets guitars enjoy a cult status. Past players include Carl Perkins, Mark Farner of Grand Funk Railroad, Dave Fielding of The Chameleons, and Martin Gore of Depeche Mode. Genesis' Mike Rutherford converted a Micro-Frets into a 6-string bass. Wreckless Eric continues to play the same Spacetone model he has used since the 1970s. Micro-Frets also made signature models for Tommy Cash and Buddy Merrill.
