= Walk the Line =

2005 film by James Mangold

- Theatrical release poster
- Directed by: James Mangold
- Screenplay by: Gill Dennis; James Mangold
- Based on: Man in Black: His Own Story in His Own Words and Cash: The Autobiography by Johnny Cash
- Produced by: James Keach; Cathy Konrad
- Starring: Joaquin Phoenix; Reese Witherspoon; Ginnifer Goodwin; Robert Patrick
- Cinematography: Phedon Papamichael
- Edited by: Michael McCusker
- Music by: T Bone Burnett
- Production company: Fox 2000 Pictures
- Distributed by: 20th Century Fox
- Release dates: September 4, 2005 (Telluride); November 18, 2005 (United States)
- Running time: 136 minutes
- Country: United States
- Language: English
- Budget: $28 million
- Box office: $186.8 million

Walk the Line is a 2005 American biographical drama film directed by James Mangold. The screenplay, written by Mangold and Gill Dennis, is based on two autobiographies by the American singer-songwriter Johnny Cash: Man in Black: His Own Story in His Own Words (1975) and Cash: The Autobiography (1997). The film follows Cash's early life, his romance with the singer June Carter, his ascent in the country music scene, and his drug addiction. It stars Joaquin Phoenix as Cash, Reese Witherspoon as Carter, Ginnifer Goodwin as Cash's first wife Vivian Liberto, and Robert Patrick as Cash's father.

Walk the Line premiered at the Telluride Film Festival on September 4, 2005, and was theatrically released by 20th Century Fox on November 18. It received positive reviews and was a box office success, grossing $186.8 million on a $28 million budget. At the 78th Academy Awards, Witherspoon won Best Actress while the film was also nominated for Best Actor (Phoenix), Best Sound Mixing, Best Costume Design and Best Film Editing.

== Plot ==
The film begins in 1968 with Johnny Cash performing at Folsom State Prison. As the audience of inmates cheer him on, Cash waits backstage near a table saw, which reminds him of his early life. Two decades earlier, in 1944, 12-year-old Johnny is raised on a cotton farm in Dyess, Arkansas, with his brother Jack, his abusive father Ray, his mother Carrie, and his two sisters. One day, Jack is killed in a sawmill accident while Johnny is out fishing. Ray blames Johnny for Jack's death, saying that the Devil "took the wrong son". In 1950, Johnny enlists in the U.S. Air Force and is stationed in West Germany. While there, he purchases a guitar and finds solace in writing songs, including "Folsom Prison Blues", which he develops in 1952.

After his discharge from the military in 1954, Johnny returns to the United States and marries his girlfriend, Vivian Liberto. The couple moves to Memphis, Tennessee, where Cash works as a door-to-door salesman to support his growing family, but with little success. One day, Johnny walks past a recording studio and is inspired to form a band to play gospel music. He and his band audition for Sam Phillips, the owner of Sun Records, and Phillips signs them after they play "Folsom Prison Blues." The band tours as Johnny Cash and the Tennessee Two, along with other rising stars Elvis Presley, Carl Perkins, Roy Orbison and Jerry Lee Lewis.

Johnny meets country music singer and songwriter June Carter while on tour and is immediately smitten. He tries to woo her, but she gently rebuffs his attempts. Despite this, they become friends. As Johnny grows up, he begins abusing drugs and alcohol, and over the objections of Vivian, he persuades June to go on tour with him. The tour is a success, but backstage, Vivian becomes critical of June's influence over Johnny. After one performance in Las Vegas, Johnny and June sleep together. The next morning, June notices Johnny taking pills and begins to doubt her choice to be with him. At their concert that evening, Johnny is upset by June's apparent rejection and behaves erratically, eventually passing out on stage. June is upset with Johnny's behavior and decides to dispose of his drugs. She begins to write "Ring of Fire" as a way to describe her feelings for him and the pain she feels as she watches him descend into addiction.

After returning to California, Johnny travels to Mexico to purchase more drugs and is arrested. Soon after, Johnny's marriage to Vivian implodes; they divorce, and he moves to Nashville, Tennessee, in 1966. Johnny buys a large house near a lake in Hendersonville, Tennessee, in an attempt to reconcile with June. Ray and other members of the extended Carter family arrive for Thanksgiving, where Ray and Johnny get into an argument, and June's mother urges June to help Johnny. Johnny goes into detox and awakens next to June, who says they have been given a second chance. They begin a tentative relationship, but June resists Cash's marriage proposals.

Later, Johnny records an album live at Folsom Prison after discovering that most of his fan mail is from prisoners. The performance is a success, and Johnny embarks on a tour with June and his band. At the end of the film, Johnny invites June to join him for a duet but stops in the middle of the song and tells her that he can't sing "Jackson" anymore unless she agrees to marry him. June accepts, and they share a passionate embrace on stage. Later, Johnny and his father reconcile their relationship while they are with their families.

== Cast ==
- Joaquin Phoenix as Johnny Cash
- Reese Witherspoon as June Carter
- Ginnifer Goodwin as Vivian Cash (née Liberto)
- Robert Patrick as Ray Cash
- McGhee Monteith as Reba Cash
- Dallas Roberts as Sam Phillips
- Dan John Miller as Luther Perkins
- Larry Bagby as Marshall Grant
- Shelby Lynne as Carrie Cash
- Tyler Hilton as Elvis Presley
- Waylon Payne as Jerry Lee Lewis
- Shooter Jennings as Waylon Jennings
- Sandra Ellis Lafferty as Maybelle Carter
- Dan Beene as Ezra Carter
- Clay Steakley as W.S. "Fluke" Holland
- Johnathan Rice as Roy Orbison
- Johnny Holiday as Carl Perkins
- Ridge Canipe as young J.R.
- Lucas Till as young Jack Cash

== Development and pre-production ==
The film has its origins in a 1993 episode of Dr. Quinn, Medicine Woman. That year, Johnny Cash was a guest star on the show, where he and June Carter became friends with Jane Seymour, the star of the show, and Seymour's ex-husband James Keach who was directing the episode. By the mid-1990s, Cash had asked Keach to make a film of his life; he and Seymour began the process with a series of interviews. In 1997, the interviews had been the basis of a screenplay written by Gill Dennis, with input from Keach; two years later, still lacking any studio interest, Keach contacted James Mangold, who had been "angling to become involved in the project for two years." Mangold and his wife, producer Cathy Konrad, visited Johnny Cash and his wife June in 1999 to discuss the project. They developed the script for Sony Pictures, and by 2001, they had a screenplay they thought they could pitch to a studio. Sony and others turned it down, but Fox 2000 Pictures agreed to make the film.

The film was in part based on two autobiographies, both of which were optioned: Man in Black (1975) and Cash: The Autobiography (1997), though the film "burrows deep into painful territory that Mr. Cash barely explored."

Joaquin Phoenix met Cash months before hearing about the film. When Phoenix read the script, he felt there were at least ten other actors who would be better in the role. Russell Crowe was offered the role of Cash but turned it down as he felt it would feel wrong, a decision he later regretted.

In 2003 - before their deaths - both Johnny and June Cash approved the casting of the lead actors Joaquin Phoenix and Reese Witherspoon.

All of Cash's vocal tracks in the film and on the accompanying soundtrack are played and sung by Phoenix. With the help of a voice coach he lowered his voice by an octave.

Reese Witherspoon initially was surprised to learn she had to perform the vocals herself. So to prepare for her role as June Carter, she studied videos of the singer; she also listened to her singing and telling stories to get her voice right. She attributes the quality of her singing in the film to the production and guidance of T Bone Burnett. Learning the autoharp was something she later described as a greater difficulty compared to the singing part. She hired Kit Alderson (who also taught Phoenix how to play the guitar) to teach her the instrument. Witherspoon experienced severe stage fright and physical illness before her first live performance scene in front of extras.

== Release ==
Walk the Line was released on November 18, 2005, in 2,961 theaters, grossing $22.3 million on its opening weekend behind Harry Potter and the Goblet of Fire. It went on to earn $119.5 million in North America and $66.9 million in the rest of the world for a total of $186.4 million, well above its $28 million budget, making it a box office success. It was the all-time highest-grossing music biopic until Straight Outta Compton surpassed it in 2015.

== Reception ==
=== Critical response ===
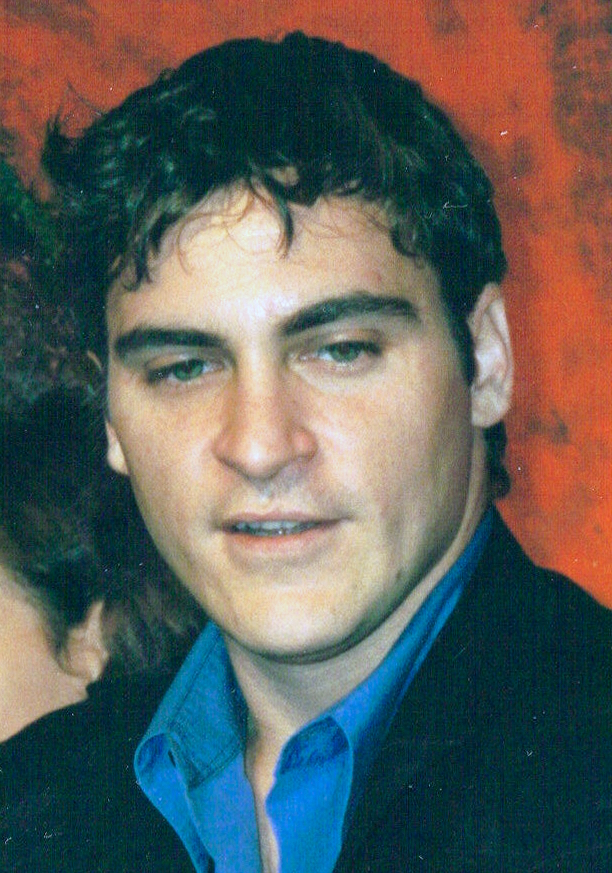
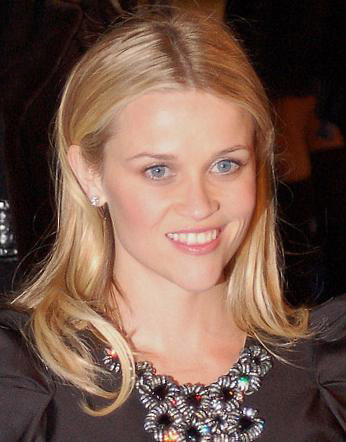
The performances of Joaquin Phoenix and Reese Witherspoon received widespread critical acclaim, with critics describing Witherspoon's performance as her best work to date. Both earned Academy Award nominations for Best Actor and Best Actress respectively, with Witherspoon winning her category.

Walk the Line has an approval rating of 83% on the review aggregator website Rotten Tomatoes based on 208 reviews. The website's critical consensus reads: "Superior acting and authentic crooning capture the emotional subtleties of the legend of Johnny Cash with a freshness that is a pleasure to watch." Metacritic assigned the film a weighted average score of 72 out of 100, based on 39 critics, indicating "generally favorable reviews". Audiences polled by CinemaScore gave the film an average grade of "A" on an A+ to F scale.

Roger Ebert praised Witherspoon for her "boundless energy" and predicted that she would win the Academy Award for Best Actress. Regarding Phoenix, Ebert wrote: "Knowing Johnny Cash's albums more or less by heart, I closed my eyes to focus on the soundtrack and decided that, yes, that was the voice of Johnny Cash I was listening to. The closing credits make it clear it's Joaquin Phoenix doing the singing, and I was gob-smacked." In her review for the Los Angeles Times, Carina Chocano wrote: "Joaquin Phoenix and Reese Witherspoon do first-rate work – they sing, they twang, they play new-to-them instruments, they crackle with wit and charisma, and they give off so much sexual heat it's a wonder they don't burst into flames."

A. O. Scott, in his review for The New York Times, had problems with Phoenix's performance: "Even though his singing voice doesn't match the original – how could it? – he is most convincing in concert when his shoulders tighten and he cocks his head to one side. Otherwise, he seems stuck in the kind of off-the-rack psychological straitjacket in which Hollywood likes to confine troubled geniuses." In his review for Time, Richard Corliss wrote: "A lot of credit for Phoenix's performance has to go to Mangold, who has always been good at finding the bleak melodrama in taciturn souls ... If Mangold's new movie has a problem, it's that he and co-screenwriter Gill Dennis sometimes walk the lines of the inspirational biography too rigorously."

Andrew Sarris, in his review for The New York Observer, praised Witherspoon for her "spine-tingling feistiness", and wrote: "This feat has belatedly placed it (in my mind, at least) among a mere handful of more-than-Oscar-worthy performances this year." He also ranked the film as number seven on his top films list of 2005 and Witherspoon as the best female performance of the year. Owen Gleiberman of Entertainment Weekly gave the film a "B+" rating and wrote: "While Witherspoon, a fine singer herself, makes Carter immensely likable, a fountain of warmth and cheer, given how sweetly she meshes with Phoenix her romantic reticence isn't filled in." The Baltimore Sun contributor Michael Sragow wrote: "What Phoenix and Witherspoon accomplish in this movie is transcendent. They act with every bone and inch of flesh and facial plane, and each tone and waver of their voice. They do their singing with a startling mastery of country music's narrative musicianship." In his review for Sight & Sound, Mark Kermode wrote: "Standing ovations, too, for Witherspoon, who has perhaps the tougher task of lending depth and darkness to the role of June, whose frighteningly chipper stage act - a musical-comedy hybrid - constantly courts (but never marries) mockery." David Ansen of Newsweek ranked Witherspoon as one of the five best actresses of 2005.

Some critics found the film too constrained by Hollywood plot formulas of love and loss, ignoring the last twenty years of Cash's life and other more socio-politically controversial reasons he was considered "the man in black".

Cash's daughter, Rosanne Cash, had mixed feelings about the film. She did not enjoy the "painful" experience of seeing the film, "because it had the three most damaging events of my childhood: my parents' divorce, my father's drug addiction, and something else bad that I can't remember now". Regarding the work of the filmmakers, she said "The three of them [in the film] were not recognizable to me as my parents in any way. But the scenes were recognizable, and the storyline, so the whole thing was fraught with sadness because they all had just died, and I had this resistance to seeing the screen version of my childhood. I don't resent them making it - I thought it was an honorable approach. I loved the film Ray, but I'm sure if you asked Ray Charles's kids, they would tell you, 'Well, that's not exactly how it was...' "

=== Accolades ===
Walk the Line won the Golden Globe Award for Best Motion Picture – Musical or Comedy and the North Texas Film Critics Association Award for Best Picture.

For his portrayal of Johnny Cash, Phoenix won the Golden Globe Award for Best Actor – Motion Picture Musical or Comedy, Hollywood Film Award for Actor of the Year, and North Texas Film Critics Association Award for Best Actor. He also received nominations for the Academy Award for Best Actor, BAFTA Award for Best Actor in a Leading Role, Critics' Choice Movie Award for Best Actor, Satellite Award for Best Actor – Motion Picture Musical or Comedy, and Screen Actors Guild Award for Outstanding Performance by a Male Actor in a Leading Role, among others. For his involvement on the film's soundtrack, he won the Grammy Award for Best Compilation Soundtrack Album for Motion Picture, Television, or Other Visual Media, sharing the win with T Bone Burnett (producer) and Mike Piersante (engineer/mixer).

For her portrayal of June Carter, Witherspoon won the Academy Award for Best Actress, Austin Film Critics Association Award for Best Actress, Awards Circuit Community Award for Best Actress in a Leading Role, BAFTA Award for Best Actress in a Leading Role, Boston Society of Film Critics Award for Best Actress, Critics' Choice Movie Award for Best Actress, Florida Film Critics Circle Award for Best Actress, Golden Globe Award for Best Actress – Motion Picture Comedy or Musical, Kansas City Film Critics Circle Award for Best Actress, Las Vegas Film Critics Society Award for Best Actress, National Society of Film Critics Award for Best Actress, New York Film Critics Circle Award for Best Actress, North Texas Film Critics Association Award for Best Actress, Online Film & Television Association Award for Best Actress, Online Film Critics Society Award for Best Actress, San Francisco Bay Area Film Critics Circle Award for Best Actress, Satellite Award for Best Actress – Motion Picture Musical or Comedy, Screen Actors Guild Award for Outstanding Performance by a Female Actor in a Leading Role, Utah Film Critics Association Award for Best Actress, and Washington D.C. Area Film Critics Association Award for Best Actress. She was also voted Favorite Leading Actress at the 32nd People's Choice Awards.

The film was also nominated for the Academy Award for Best Costume Design, Best Film Editing, and Best Sound Mixing.

== Home media ==
On February 28, 2006, a single-disc DVD and a two-disc collector edition DVD were released; these editions sold three million copies on their first day of release. On March 25, 2008, a two-disc 'extended cut' DVD was released for Region One. The feature on disc one is 17 minutes longer than the theatrical release, and disc two features eight extended musical sequences with introductions and documentaries about the making of the film. The film has been released on Blu-ray Disc in France, Sweden, and the UK in the form of its extended cut. The American Blu-ray features a shorter theatrical cut.

The film was released on a double movie collection DVD pack with Romeo + Juliet in 2010.

== Soundtrack ==
Wind-up Records released the soundtrack in November 2005. It featured nine songs performed by Joaquin Phoenix, four songs by Reese Witherspoon, two songs by Tyler Hilton, and one song each by Waylon Payne, Johnathan Rice, and Shooter Jennings. The album received a Grammy at the 49th Annual Grammy Awards for Best Compilation Soundtrack Album for Motion Pictures, Television or Other Visual Media.

== See also ==
- Elvis, a television movie also released in 2005 about Cash's friend and fellow American icon Elvis Presley, portrayed by Jonathan Rhys Meyers, focusing on his early life during the 1950s and 60s. It is considered an unofficial companion piece to Walk the Line, as it also begins and ends in 1968 with Presley performing at his Comeback Special concert (11 months after Cash did his Folsom Prison concert), and also features Robert Patrick who in this film portrays Presley's father Vernon. Actor Clay Steakley, who portrayed Cash's drummer Fluke Holland, also appears in Elvis as Presley's bassist Bill Black.
- Walk Hard: The Dewey Cox Story, a 2007 comedy film about fictional singer Dewey Cox, played by John C. Reilly. It serves as a parody of Walk the Line and the musical biopic genre.
- Crazy, a 2007 independent biopic also starring Waylon Payne, this time portraying legendary guitarist/songwriter Hank Garland, about his rise from Nashville in the 1950s.
- Ring of Fire, a 2013 made-for-television film about June Carter Cash, portrayed by singer/actress Jewel, and also focuses on her marriage and relationship with Johnny Cash, portrayed by Matt Ross. It is based on their son John Carter Cash's book Anchored in Love: An Intimate Portrait of June Carter Cash.
- A Complete Unknown, Mangold's 2024 biopic about Bob Dylan in which Johnny Cash is portrayed in the film by Boyd Holbrook.
