= Hey, Porter =

Single by Johnny Cash
- A-side: "Cry! Cry! Cry!"
- Released: June 21, 1955
- Recorded: March 22, 1955
- Genre: Rockabilly
- Length: 2:14
- Label: Sun Records
- Songwriter: Johnny Cash
- Producer: Sam Phillips

Johnny Cash singles chronology
"Cry! Cry! Cry!" (1955)	"Hey, Porter" (1955)	"So Doggone Lonesome" (1955)

"Hey, Porter" is a song by Johnny Cash. It was recorded on September 1, 1954, and released as a single in May the following year. It tells the story of a train journey home to Tennessee, from the point of view of an excited passenger who continually asks the porter for updates.

== Origins ==
"Hey Porter" is Johnny Cash and the Tennessee Two's first recording; Cash wrote the song with bandmates Luther Perkins and Marshall Grant after Sam Phillips (Owner of Sun Records) turned down "I Was There When It Happened", the song with which the three auditioned. Phillips reportedly "didn't want a gospel song, he wanted a fast song" in the vein of Elvis Presley's "That's All Right". Having been stationed in Landsberg, Germany, during his stint with the United States Air Force, Cash based the song on a man returning home from overseas who felt elated to be returning to his native South. "Hey Porter" was the first of many rail-themed songs that Cash would record during his career and was soon followed by "Folsom Prison Blues", another rail-themed track. Unlike its A-side, "Cry! Cry! Cry!", it would not be included on his debut album, Johnny Cash with His Hot and Blue Guitar!

The song is, however, available on many compilations, such as The Complete Sun Singles, The Essential Johnny Cash, Ring Of Fire: The Legend of Johnny Cash Volume Two, and The Legend.

"Hey Porter" was covered by Ry Cooder in 1972 on his second album Into the Purple Valley. Cash himself re-recorded the song several times as well. Additionally, Cash contributed the vocal for the cover version of "Hey Porter" on the Earl Scruggs Revue album Anniversary Special in 1975.

== See also ==
- List of train songs
