= Luther Perkins =

American guitarist (1928–1968)

- Born: Luther Monroe Perkins Jr. January 8, 1928; Como, Mississippi, U.S.
- Died: August 5, 1968 (aged 40) Hendersonville, Tennessee, U.S.
- Genres: Country, rockabilly
- Occupation: Musician
- Instruments: Guitar, baritone guitar
- Years active: 1954–1968

Luther Monroe Perkins Jr. (January 8, 1928 – August 5, 1968) was an American country music guitarist best known as a member of the Tennessee Three, the backing band for singer Johnny Cash. Perkins was an iconic figure in what would become known as rockabilly music. His creatively simple, sparsely embellished, rhythmic use of Fender Esquire, Jazzmaster, and Jaguar guitars is credited with creating Cash's signature "boom-chicka-boom" style.

== Early life and musical beginnings ==
Perkins was born in Como, Mississippi, the third of five children of Rev. Luther Monroe Perkins Sr., a Baptist preacher, and Delphia Anna Stewart Perkins. He grew up in Como, and taught himself to play rhythm guitar.

Perkins started his career in 1953 as a mechanic at Automobile Sales Company in Memphis. He specialized in electrical systems and radio repairs. At Automobile Sales, Perkins met co-workers Marshall Grant and A. W. "Red" Kernodle. Grant, Kernodle, and Perkins began bringing their guitars to work, and would play together when repair business was slow.

When Johnny Cash moved to Memphis after returning from Germany in 1954, Roy Cash introduced him to Grant, Kernodle, and Perkins. The four began to get together in the evenings at Perkins' or Grant's home and play songs. During this time, they decided to form a band, with Grant acquiring a string bass, Kernodle a six-string steel guitar, and Perkins buying a somewhat-abused Fender Esquire electric guitar from the O.K. Houck Piano Co. in Memphis. The guitar had been modified by a previous owner, and the volume and tone controls did not work.

== "Boom-chicka-boom" style ==
To tone down the sustained bottom end so that it would not compete with the other instruments, Perkins began the practice of muting the three bass strings (E, A, and D) with the heel of his right hand, much in the style of Merle Travis, and scratching a rhythm pattern (as heard on Sun Records recordings prior to 1958). This pattern developed into a more defined, varying 1/8-8/5/8-8 picking (with random syncopation) on later Sun recordings and for the rest of Perkins' career.

In late 1954, when Cash got an audition with producer Sam Phillips at Sun Records, he brought Perkins, Grant, and Kernodle along to back him instrumentally. The experience made Kernodle nervous, and he ended up leaving before the session was over, with Perkins and Grant providing the instrumentation.

Perkins, as a member of the Tennessee Two (later, the Tennessee Three, with the addition of drummer W.S. "Fluke" Holland), toured with Cash and appeared on most of his recordings. He was well known for his laconic, focused demeanor on stage. He was often the target of jokes by Cash, who would make comments such as, "Luther's been dead for years, but he just doesn't know it".

Perkins was Cash's lead guitarist on many of the popular Town Hall Party television appearances in the 1950s, often interacting with one another for stage effect and providing the signature "boom-chick-a-boom" background sound that came to define a large part of Johnny Cash's sound. In his 1997 memoir Cash, the singer recalled, "Keith Richards came to one of our British shows, at a U.S. military base in the early '60s, but he wasn't interested in me; Luther was the one he couldn't wait to watch."

== Personal life ==
Perkins was married twice. His first wife, Bertie Lee Moore (1927–2016), and he separated while they were living in Southern California in 1959. Perkins had three daughters: Linda Kay (1949–2017), Vickie, and Claudia. He later married Margie Higgins; Margie Higgins' niece Kathy lived with them. Margie Perkins Beaver still appears at Johnny Cash reunion events.

His hobbies included knitting and fishing.

He was a close friend of singer-songwriter Kris Kristofferson's. At the time of his death, he was planning to open his own music publishing company and give Kristofferson his first break.

Perkins' younger brother, Thomas, was a successful rock 'n' roll singer in the 1950s and 1960s, under the name of Thomas Wayne.

In his autobiography, Johnny Cash wrote that Perkins was mildly addicted to amphetamines. They started taking drugs together in the late 1950s.

Perkins' nickname since childhood was "L.M." (pronounced "ellem"), the initials of his first and second name "Luther Monroe". Singer-guitarist Carl Perkins, who was also a member of Cash's touring show, was not related to Luther Perkins.

== Death ==
During the early morning hours of August 3, 1968, Perkins returned from fishing on Old Hickory Lake to his newly constructed home on Riverwood Drive, Hendersonville, Tennessee. He allegedly went to sleep in the living room while holding a lit cigarette, though he had not smoked in years by this time, according to family. His niece by marriage awoke around 6:00 am to find the living room aflame and Perkins collapsed near the door, almost dead. An emergency crew rushed Perkins to Vanderbilt University Hospital, where he was kept under intensive care until he died two days later.

He is buried near the graves of Johnny Cash and June Carter Cash at Hendersonville Memorial Park in Hendersonville, Tennessee.

== Aftermath and tributes ==
After Perkins's death, Johnny Cash invited close friend Carl Perkins (no relation to Luther) to fill in as lead guitarist for the band. Perkins, off and on, remained a part of Cash's touring group for the next decade. In September 1968, Cash hired Bob Wootton, an Arkansas guitar player who had been a lifelong fan of Cash's, as permanent lead guitarist for the group. Apart from a brief respite, Wootton stayed with the band for 29 years until Cash finally retired from touring and performing live in 1997.

In October 1968, almost two months after Luther's death, Cash's hit live album Johnny Cash at Folsom Prison, on which Perkins had played, won Album of the Year at the second-ever Country Music Association Awards. In his acceptance speech, Cash signaled out Luther as he thanked those who supported him, ending his remarks by thanking "Luther Perkins, especially."

On Cash's follow-up live album Johnny Cash at San Quentin, recorded and released the following year, one of the inmates in the audience is heard asking Johnny where Luther is. After Cash announces Perkins's death, months earlier, to the crowd, Cash asks everyone to give "one big cheer for Luther Perkins", with which the audience complies, bursting into loud cheers and applause.

Luther Perkins was inducted into the Rockabilly Hall of Fame, as inductee number 0230.

== Controversy ==
In 1980, Perkins's daughters from his first marriage filed suit against Johnny Cash for embezzling funds that were to have provided retirement income for Perkins. This lawsuit was filed coincidentally with actions taken by the other founding Tennessee Three member, Marshall Grant, against Cash for wrongfully firing Grant and embezzlement of Grant's retirement funds. Both lawsuits were eventually settled out-of-court.

== Walk the Line ==
In Walk the Line, the 2005 biopic of Johnny Cash, Perkins is portrayed by Dan John Miller. Perkins's future death is alluded to in the film in a bus scene where Cash (played by Joaquin Phoenix) walks past Perkins. Perkins is depicted as asleep with a lit cigarette in his mouth; Cash removes the cigarette and stubs it out in an ashtray in front of Perkins.
