= WS Holland =

American drummer (1935–2020)

- Holland playing in the mid-2000s

Background information
- Born: April 22, 1935; Saltillo, Tennessee, U.S.
- Died: September 23, 2020 (aged 85) Jackson, Tennessee, U.S.
- Genres: Country; rockabilly
- Instrument: Drums
- Years active: c. 1955-c. 2020
- Formerly of: The Tennessee Three; The Great Eighties Eight

WS "Fluke" Holland (April 22, 1935 – September 23, 2020) was an American drummer who played with Carl Perkins, and later for Johnny Cash in the bands the Tennessee Three, the Great Eighties Eight, and the Johnny Cash Show Band.

== Career ==
He played drums on the 1955 Sun Records recording of "Blue Suede Shoes" and performed on the "Million Dollar Quartet" session that featured Elvis Presley, Jerry Lee Lewis, Perkins, and Cash. Holland appeared with the Carl Perkins band in the 1957 rock and roll movie Jamboree, performing "Glad All Over."

The Tennessee Three ended in 2003 following Cash's death. In 2005, Holland remade the trio. In January 2008, Bob Wootton announced on his mySpace page that Holland had decided against continued touring with him, instead forming the "WS Holland band". In an interview, Wootton said that Holland had decided to dissolve the partnership after Wootton backed out of playing the Folsom anniversary concert.

In 2014, Holland was honored at the Carl Perkins Center in Jackson, Tennessee for his 60 years of musical contributions.

In 2018, Holland was honored with the "Lifetime Achievement" award during the annual Tennessee Music Awards event at the University of Memphis Lambuth in Jackson, Tennessee. He was also inducted into the Radio Nostalgi Hall of Fame in Sweden on July 3, 2016.

Holland made a cameo appearance on the History Channel program Pawn Stars, accompanying a classic car collector who was trying to sell Johnny Cash's Rolls-Royce to Rick Harrison. They did not agree on a price.

== Personal life ==
Holland was born in Saltillo, Tennessee on April 22, 1935, and graduated from J.B. Young High School in Bemis. He died at his home in Jackson, Tennessee on September 23, 2020, at the age of 85.
