= The Tennessee Three =

Backing band for Johnny Cash

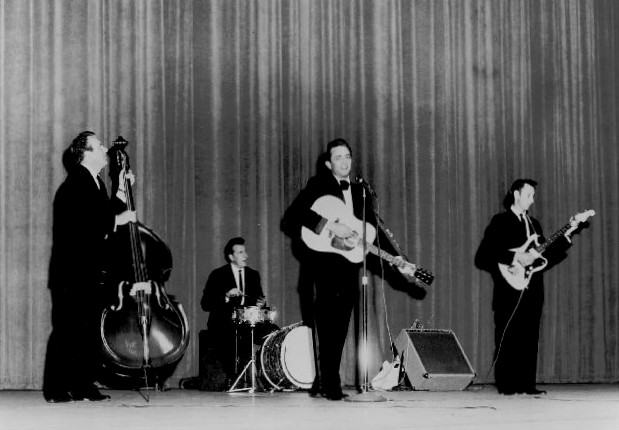
- Johnny Cash and the Tennessee Three in 1961. From left: Marshall Grant, W. S. Holland, Cash and Luther Perkins

Background information
- Also known as: Johnny Cash and the Tennessee Two (1955-1959/1960); The Tennessee Two and Friend (1959/1960); Johnny Cash and the Tennessee Three (1959/1960-1980); The Great Eighties Eight (1980-1989); The Johnny Cash Show Band (1989-2003)
- Origin: Memphis, Tennessee
- Genres: Country; rock and roll; rockabilly; blues
- Years active: 1954−2003
- Past members: Johnny Cash; Luther Perkins; Marshall Grant; A.W. "Red" Kernodle; WS Holland; Carl Perkins; Bob Wootton; Gordon Terry; Marty Stuart; John Carter Cash; Many others (see timeline)

Johnny Cash's band, known from 1959 until 1980 as the Tennessee Three, was a country and rockabilly backing band. The core members included bassist Marshall Grant, guitarist Luther Perkins, and drummer WS Holland, though many lineup changes occurred throughout Cash's lifetime. The group provided a complementary element that came to be recognized by fans as "the Johnny Cash sound".

== History ==
Roy Cash Sr., oldest brother of Johnny Cash, was service manager at a car dealership in Memphis, Tennessee. In 1953, while the younger Cash was stationed in Germany with the US Air Force, Luther Perkins joined the staff there, where he met co-workers Marshall Grant and A.W. "Red" Kernodle. Grant, Kernodle and Perkins began bringing their guitars to work and would play together when repair business was slow.

When Johnny Cash moved to Memphis after returning from Germany in 1954, Roy introduced him to Grant, Kernodle, and Perkins. The four began to get together in the evenings at Perkins' or Grant's home and play songs. During this time they decided to form a band, with Grant moving to an upright bass, Kernodle to a six-string steel guitar, and Perkins buying a Fender Esquire electric guitar. Perkins' performance style on the Fender resulted in the band's famous steady, simple "boom-chicka-boom" or "freight train" rhythm.

By 1955, Cash and his bandmates were in the Memphis studio of Sun Records to audition for owner Sam Phillips. Kernodle was so nervous that he left the session and the group, not wanting to hold them back. The band presented themselves as "the Tennessee Three", but Phillips suggested that they call themselves Johnny Cash and the Tennessee Two. When Cash moved to Columbia Records in 1958, Grant and Perkins followed him.

In 1960, drummer WS Holland joined the group, which was renamed the Tennessee Three. Holland has been credited as one of the first country music drummers. He had collaborated with Cash on recordings earlier in the 1950s, as well as having played with Carl Perkins (no relation to Luther Perkins) and the "Perkins Brothers Band". In 1961, the group released two instrumental singles on Columbia recorded in 1959 (before Holland joined) as the Tennessee Two and Friend. The four songs would later be included in Cash's greatest hits collection More of Old Golden Throat.

Luther Perkins died from injuries sustained in a house fire in August 1968 after reportedly having fallen asleep with a lit cigarette. Bob Wootton filled in as the group's guitarist at a performance the following month and then continued with the band. He participated in their landmark February 1969 performance with Cash at San Quentin State Prison, when the singer's live album was recorded.

In 1971, the group (without Cash and Carl Perkins) recorded an instrumental album dedicated to Luther Perkins: The Tennessee Three: The Sound Behind Johnny Cash.

Through the 1970s, the Tennessee Three continued to work as Cash's studio and stage backing group. One major exception occurred in 1975 when Columbia Records, seeking to update Cash's sound, had the singer record an album with a new set of session musicians (including members of Elvis Presley's touring band), titled John R. Cash. This was the only major Cash recording of the era on which no member of The Tennessee Three participated. The album was unsuccessful. The next album released, Look at Them Beans, reinstated both the Tennessee Three as core session musicians and the accompanying Johnny Cash sound.

In 1980, Marshall Grant left to become manager of the Statler Brothers. Cash decided to discontinue using the name "The Tennessee Three", ostensibly for legal reasons (Grant had filed a lawsuit against Cash, which was settled out of court years later). The reconstituted band was called the Great Eighties Eight after Grant left. Others joined the group after that, with Holland and (usually) Wootton remaining as the group's anchors.

In September 1989, Cash hired Kerry Marx and Steve Logan as lead guitarist and bassist, respectively, and renamed the group the Johnny Cash Show Band. By the early 1990s, the band consisted of Bob Wootton (guitar), WS Holland (drums), Dave Roe (upright bass), the singer's son John Carter Cash (rhythm guitar), and Earl Poole Ball (piano). This was the final configuration of the Johnny Cash Show Band until Cash's death in 2003. (Marty Stuart joined the group on guitar for a one-off performance of Cash's version of "Rusty Cage" on The Tonight Show with Jay Leno in 1996.) The group made its final appearance backing Cash (with Marshall Grant in a surprise appearance on string bass) on April 6, 1999, while taping a TNT television special in New York City.

After Cash's death in 2003, then-manager Trevor Chowning revived the band's career in 2006. They recorded and released a tribute album to Johnny Cash titled The Sound Must Go On.

In August 2007, the band made their first appearance in Scotland since the 1990s at the Belladrum Tartan Heart Festival, Inverness-shire. A planned Tennessee Three concert in January 2008, commemorating the 40th anniversary of Cash's Folsom Prison performance, was scrapped after disputes between prison managers and the concert promoter.

In January 2008, Wootton announced on his mySpace page that Holland had decided against continued touring with him, instead forming the "WS Holland band". In an interview, Wootton said that Holland had decided to dissolve the partnership after Wootton backed out of playing the Folsom anniversary concert.

As The Tennessee Three, Wootton, drummer Rodney Blake Powell, and Vicky and Scarlett Wootton continued touring in 2008 to appreciative crowds across the globe. The band continued to tour throughout 2009, with the addition of upright bassist Lisa Horngren and drummer Derrick McCullough. In 2012, Wootton's band released another album, titled All Over Again. It includes a new song "How a Cowboy Has to Ride", written by Vicky Wootton.

Wootton died of dementia on April 9, 2017, in Gallatin, Tennessee, at the age of 75. Holland died at his home in Jackson, Tennessee on September 23, 2020, at the age of 85. Former rhythm guitarist and multi-instrumentalist Marty Stuart remains active as a solo artist and in collaboration with his wife, country singer Connie Smith. Former lead guitarist Kerry Marx remains active as a session and touring guitarist for various musicians and joined the Grand Ole Opry as one of their guitarists in 2000 before becoming the Opry's musical director in 2018. John Carter Cash also remains active in music, mostly in working to maintain his father's musical legacy by producing various releases of archive recordings.

== Personnel ==
(Tennessee Three members listed in bold.)

- **Johnny Cash** – lead vocals, acoustic rhythm guitar (1954–2003; died 2003)
- **Luther Perkins** – lead guitar (1954–1968; died 1968)
- **Marshall Grant** – double bass, electric bass (1954–1980; one-off performance in 1999; died 2011)
- A. W. "Red" Kernodle – steel guitar (1954–1955)
- **WS Holland** – drums (1959–2003, 2005–2008; died 2020) (Johnny Cash himself stated during a performance that Holland was "my drummer since 1959.")
- Carl Perkins – vocals, rhythm guitar, lead guitar (1966–1974; died 1998) (officially joined on lead in August 1968 after Luther Perkins died)
- **Bob Wootton** – lead guitar (1968–1989, 1992–2003, 2005–2008); lead vocals (2005–2008) (died 2017)
- Larry Butler – piano (1972; died 2012)
- Bill Walker – piano (1973; died 2022)
- Larry McCoy – piano (1973–1976)
- Jerry Hensley – rhythm guitar (1978–1982)
- Tommy Williams – fiddle (1974)
- Gordon Terry – fiddle (1975–1976; died 2006)
- **Earl Poole Ball** – piano (1977–1997)
- Jack Hale Jr – trumpet (1980–1989) (Tennessee Trumpets)
- Bob Lewin – French horn (1980–1989) (Tennessee Trumpets)
- Joe Allen - electric bass (1980, 1986–1988)
- Henry Strzelecki - electric bass (1980)
- Marty Stuart – rhythm guitar, electric bass, fiddle, mandolin (1980-1986; one-off appearance in 1996)
- Bodie Powell – electric bass (1981)
- Jimmy Tittle – electric bass (1982–1986, 1988–1989)
- Jim Elliot – rhythm guitar (1986–1989)
- Jim Soldi – rhythm guitar, lead guitar (1987–1989)
- John Carter Cash – backing vocals, rhythm guitar (1988–2003)
- Kerry Marx – lead guitar (1989–1992)
- Steve Logan – electric bass (1989–1992)
- Hugh Wadell – drums (May 1989; substitute for WS Holland)
- Dave Roe – double bass (1992–2003)

== Walk the Line ==
In the 2005 film biography of Johnny Cash, Walk the Line, the band members were portrayed by the following actors. True to their supposed characterizations described earlier, Perkins was played as stiff and expressionless onstage, while Grant was played as animated and gregarious:

- Luther Perkins – Dan John Miller
- Marshall Grant – Larry Bagby
- W.S. Holland – Clay Steakley

The film contains a subtle foreshadowing of Perkins' fate, in a brief scene in which Perkins falls asleep with a lit cigarette in his mouth. Cash retrieves the cigarette and stubs it out. Cash later suggested that this was how Perkins' house had caught fire.

Promotion for the DVD release of Walk the Line by FOX Television included a history-making screening of the film at Hollywood's famed Arclight Cinema wherein actors in the film and their real-life counterparts performed a set of Cash's music prior to the screening. Original Tennessee Three members, Bob Wootton and W. S. Holland were among those to perform as well as serve on a speaking panel after the film. Also in attendance was Jane Seymour, wife of the film's producer, James Keach.
