= Marshall Grant =

American bassist (1928–2011)

- Born: Marshall Garnett Grant; May 5, 1928; Bryson City, North Carolina, U.S.
- Died: August 7, 2011 (aged 83) Jonesboro, Arkansas, U.S.
- Genres: Country, rock and roll, rockabilly
- Occupation: Bassist
- Instruments: Double bass, bass guitar, guitar
- Years active: 1940s–2010
- Website: at the Rockabilly Hall of Fame

Marshall Garnett Grant (May 5, 1928 – August 7, 2011) was the upright bassist and electric bassist of singer Johnny Cash's original backing duo, the Tennessee Two, in which Grant and electric guitarist Luther Perkins played. The group became known as the Tennessee Three in 1960, with the addition of drummer W. S. Holland. Grant also served as road manager for Cash and his touring show company.

== Early life ==
Grant was raised in Bessemer City, North Carolina. He was one of twelve children born of Willie Leander (1888–1968) and Mary Elizabeth (Simmonds) Grant (1895–1965). His siblings are Wade (1910–1985), Olson (1912–1993), Burlas (1914–1915), Vernal (1916–1971), Eulean (1918–2012), Hershel (1921–2014), Doris (1923–2006), Odell (1925–2011), Ed (1931–2012), Norma Jean (b. 1935) and Aubrey Grant (b. 1937).

Grant married Etta May Dickerson on November 9, 1946. They had one son, Randy.

Grant and his wife settled in Memphis, Tennessee, in 1947. Grant worked as a mechanic; first for Wagner Brake Service, then C.M. Booth Motor Company, and later, Automobile Sales Company in Memphis. It was during this time that he met fellow Automobile Sales employees Luther Perkins and Roy Cash Sr., older brother of Johnny Cash. When the younger Cash returned to Memphis after serving in the U.S. Air Force, Grant, Perkins and Cash began playing together as three rhythm guitarists, along with another Automobile Sales co-worker and steel guitar player, A.W. "Red" Kernodle. Grant was a self-taught musician, learning to play the bass after the group collectively decided that Grant should switch to playing bass, and that Perkins would play lead guitar. During the formation of this group, Cash used Grant's Martin guitar for performances, and for many years thereafter, for songwriting.

Grant was an important part of the trademark 'boom-chicka-boom' sound of Johnny Cash that would change the sound of country music. He recorded with Cash from 1954 until 1980. Grant also voluntarily took on the responsibilities of road manager for Cash's touring show. During his career with Cash, Grant played Epiphone upright basses and electric basses by Fender, Epiphone and Micro-Frets. On the album cover for Johnny Cash At San Quentin, Grant's Epiphone Newport bass is famously featured in the foreground of the iconic photo by Jim Marshall. In the early 1970s, he briefly endorsed Micro-Frets instruments and Sunn amplifiers.

== Legal troubles with Cash ==
Cash's recurring drug problems eventually led to issues that resulted in Grant being fired by Cash. It was at this time that Grant discovered that Cash had embezzled retirement funds set aside for Grant and Luther Perkins.

In 1980, Grant filed suit against Cash for wrongful dismissal and for embezzlement of retirement funds. A lawsuit against Cash for slander was also considered. In coincidental action, Luther Perkins' daughters from his first marriage filed suit against Cash for embezzlement of retirement funds. Both lawsuits were eventually settled out-of-court.

Despite the bitter legal battles, the two men later reconciled. Grant contends that he was probably Cash's closest and most trusted friend; indeed, he played a critical role in helping Cash along when Cash's drug problems threatened his career and his life. Grant made a final appearance onstage with Cash in 1999 as an original member of the Tennessee Two.

== Later career ==
Following his career with Cash, Grant managed the Statler Brothers until their retirement in 2002. He last lived in Hernando, Mississippi, with his wife.

Grant's autobiographical book I Was There When It Happened: My Life With Johnny Cash was published in October 2006. It is a behind-the-scenes story of their beginnings and rise to fame.

He "laid down [his] bass for the last time" at the Brooks Museum in Memphis, Tennessee, in August 2010.

"Etta's Tune" included on Rosanne Cash's 2014 album, The River and the Thread, is dedicated to Grant and his wife.

== Powerboat Racing ==
For many years, Grant owned and raced outboard powerboats. His teams included notable drivers such as Dick Pond, Charlie Bailey and Billy Seebold. Often, members of the Johnny Cash band would work in Grant's pit crews. Grant's distinctive boats were most appropriately given such names as "Ring of Fire" and "A Boat Named Sue" among others of his personal musical references.

== Walk The Line ==
Marshall Grant is played by Larry Bagby in the 2005 film, Walk the Line

== Death ==
Marshall Grant died at the age of 83 on August 7, 2011, while in Jonesboro, Arkansas, attending a festival to restore the childhood home of Johnny Cash.
