= I Walk the Line =

1956 single by Johnny Cash

Single by Johnny Cash

from the album Johnny Cash with His Hot and Blue Guitar!
- B-side: "Get Rhythm"
- Released: May 5, 1956
- Recorded: April 2, 1956
- Studio: Sun Studio, Memphis, Tennessee
- Genre: Country; rockabilly
- Length: 2:45
- Label: Sun
- Songwriter: Johnny Cash
- Producer: Sam Phillips

Johnny Cash singles chronology
"Folsom Prison Blues" (1955)	"I Walk the Line" (1956)	"There You Go" (1956)

"I Walk the Line" excerpt
From the album Johnny Cash with His Hot and Blue Guitar! (1957)

"I Walk the Line" is a song written and recorded in 1956 by Johnny Cash. After moderate chart success, it soon became Cash's first #1 hit on the Billboard country chart, and eventually crossed over to the pop charts, reaching #19 on the Billboard "Top 100" (later renamed "Hot 100").

The song remained on the charts for over 43 weeks, and sold over two million copies. It has also been used on many LPs released from Sun Records, such as Johnny Cash with His Hot and Blue Guitar!, Johnny Cash Sings the Songs That Made Him Famous, and Johnny Cash Sings Hank Williams. It was the title song for a 1970 film starring Gregory Peck and a 2005 biopic of Cash starring Joaquin Phoenix. The song captures Johnny Cash's "boom-chicka-boom" sound by Cash putting a dollar bill in the neck of his guitar.

== Background of the song ==
The unique chord progression for "I Walk the Line" was inspired by the backwards playback of guitar runs on Cash's tape recorder while he was stationed in Germany as a member of the United States Air Force. Later in a telephone interview, Cash stated, "I wrote the song backstage one night in 1956 in Gladewater, Texas. I was newly married at the time, and I suppose I was laying out my pledge of devotion." After writing the song, Cash had a discussion with fellow performer Carl Perkins, who encouraged him to adopt "I Walk the Line" as the song title. Cash originally intended the song to be a slow ballad, but producer Sam Phillips preferred a faster arrangement; in the end, Cash agreed to the change, and the uptempo recording met with success.

On one occasion, while performing "I Walk the Line" on his TV show, Cash explained to the audience the reason for his humming during the song: "People ask me why I always hum whenever I sing this song. It's to get my pitch." The humming was necessary since the song required Cash to change keys several times while singing it.

The song's lyrics discuss resisting temptation, being accountable, and remaining faithful to Vivian Liberto during his first marriage. However, Johnny and Vivian divorced, and he married June Carter. Liberto would write a book called I Walked the Line about her time with Cash.

"I Walk the Line" was originally recorded at Sun Studio on April 2, 1956, and was released around May 5th. It spent six weeks at the top spot on the U.S. country Juke Box charts that summer, one week on the C&W Jockey charts and number two on the C&W Best Seller charts. Besides the showing in Billboard's "Top 100," Johnny's Sun single also reached #17 on the Billboard "Best Sellers in Stores" chart.

The track was cut with the Tennessee Two, Marshall Grant on bass and Luther Perkins on lead guitar, originally two mechanics introduced to Cash by his older brother Roy after Cash was discharged from the Air Force. Cash and his wife Vivian were living in Memphis, Tennessee, at the time. Cash became the frontman for the group and precipitated their introduction to Sam Phillips of Sun Records. In 1955, they began recording under the Sun label.

It was re-recorded four times during Cash's career: in 1964 for the I Walk the Line album, again in 1969 for the At San Quentin album (a live performance), in 1970 for the I Walk the Line soundtrack, and finally in 1988 for the Classic Cash: Hall of Fame Series album. Additional live performances have been released since Cash's death, along with a demo version recorded prior to the formal 1956 recording session that was released on Bootleg Vol. II: From Memphis to Hollywood (Columbia/Legacy) in 2011.

== Writing and composition ==
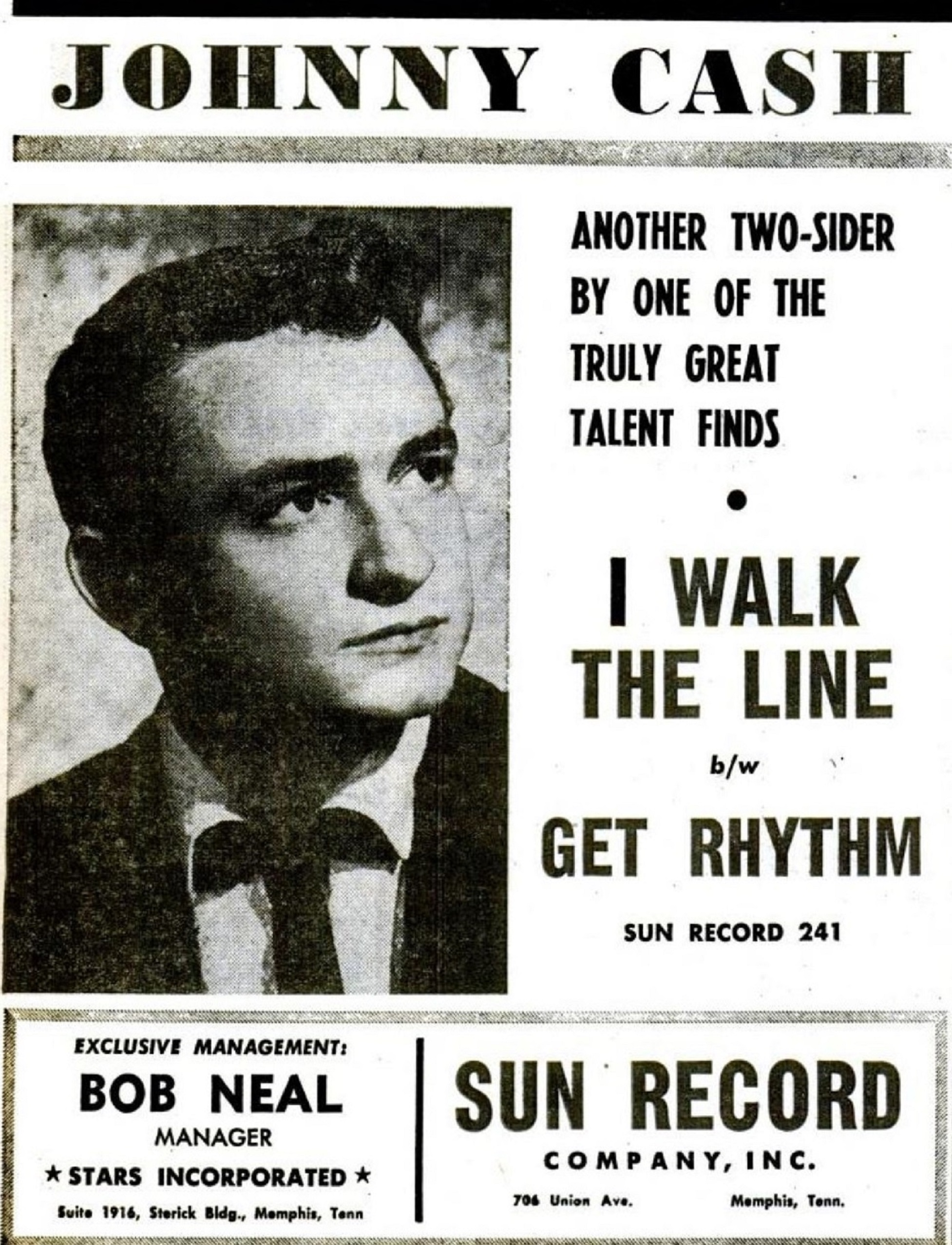
Billboard ad, May 12, 1956

The song is very simple and like most Cash songs, the lyrics tell more of a story than the music conveys. (You've got a way to keep me on your side/You give me cause for love that I can't hide/For you I know I'd even try to turn the tide).

It is based upon the "boom-chicka-boom" or "freight train" rhythm common in many of Cash's songs. In the original recording of the song, there is a key change between each of the five verses, and Cash hums the new root note before singing each verse. The final verse, a reprise of the first, is sung a full octave lower than the first verse, the root note lowered from F3 down to F2.

When performing this song in recording, and in later live and television appearances, Cash would place a piece of paper under the strings of his guitar towards the tuning end. As he explained during a 1990s appearance on The Nashville Network, he did this in order to simulate the sound of a snare drum, an instrument to which he did not have access during the original Sun session.

Johnny, with the Temptations outside his door and a new wife at home, wanted the lyrics to say, "I'm going to be true to those who believe in me and depend on me to myself and God. Something like I’m still being true, or I’m 'Walking The Line.' The lyrics came as fast as I could write," says Johnny. "In 50 minutes, I had it finished."

== Legacy ==
The song is included in "The 500 Songs That Shaped Rock and Roll", a permanent exhibit at the Rock and Roll Hall of Fame. In 2004, Rolling Stone magazine ranked the song at No. 30 on its list of the 500 Greatest Songs of All Time. and also ranked it #1 on its list of the 100 greatest country songs of all time in June 2014. In many countries like Ireland, the song was recycled to reopen closed railway lines.

Upon Cash's passing, Emmylou Harris remembered the song "sounded like a voice from the middle of the earth. It was so powerful and moving. It was profound, and so was the tone of it, every line; deep and rich, awesome and mysterious all at once."

In 1998, the 1956 recording of the song on Sun Records was inducted into the Grammy Hall of Fame. In June 2026, CBS News included the song in its list of the 250 essential American songs of the past 250 years.

== Covers ==
- Jaye P. Morgan covered the song in 1960, the single charting at No. 66.
- Connie Francis covered the song in 1962.
- The Everly Brothers covered the song on their 1963 album The Everly Brothers Sing Great Country Hits.
- Cash's former son-in-law Rodney Crowell adapted the song to a new melody and in 1998 recorded his version as a duet with Cash. This version was titled "I Walk the Line Revisited" and peaked at No. 61 on the country music charts. The song later appeared on Crowell's 2001 album The Houston Kid. The cover does not utilize the original melody of the song; instead lyrics from the song, sung by Cash to a different melody, are incorporated into a new song by Crowell.
- In 2004, Los Lonely Boys covered the song and released it as a bonus track on the special edition of their self titled debut Los Lonely Boys.
- In 2014, Craig Wayne Boyd covered this song during season 7 of The Voice. The cover reached the Top 15 on the iTunes US Country charts.
- Tapio Rautavaara made a Finnish-language version of the song, called "Yölinjalla" ('On the night line'). The Finnish lyrics tell about the hard life of truck drivers, who often had to drive through the night. The melody was originally credited as Rautavaara's own composition, but this was revised in 2008.
- Halsey recorded a cover that appeared on the deluxe version of her 2015 album Badlands as well as the trailer for the 2017 film Power Rangers.

== Chart positions ==
Chart (1957)	Peak position
US Hot Country Songs (Billboard)	1
US Billboard Hot 100	19

== Certifications and sales ==
Region	Certification	Certified units/sales
United Kingdom (BPI) Physical	Silver	250,000^{^}
United Kingdom (BPI) Digital	Gold	400,000^{‡}
United States	—	2,000,000
^{^} Shipments figures based on certification alone.^{‡} Sales+streaming figures based on certification alone.

== Laurent Wolf version ==
"Walk the Line Remix"

Single by Laurent Wolf

from the album Harmony
- Released: 21 August 2009
- Length: 2:53
- Label: Columbia
- Songwriter: Johnny Cash
- Producer: Laurent Wolf

Laurent Wolf singles chronology
"Explosion" (2009)	"Walk the Line Remix" (2009)	"Survive" (2010)

The song was covered by French house music DJ and producer Laurent Wolf and released in August 2009 as Walk the Line Remix.

=== Track listing ===
CD single
No.	Title	Length
1.	"Walk the Line" (Radio Edit)	2:53
2.	"Walk the Line" (Club Version)	6:59
3.	"No Stress" (Zen @ Acoustic)	7:35
4.	"Colombia"	5:06

=== Charts ===
Chart (2008–2009)	Peak position
Belgium (Ultratop 50 Flanders)	18
Belgium (Ultratop 50 Wallonia)	23
France (SNEP)	8
Netherlands (Single Top 100)	83
