= Folsom Prison Blues =

Song by Johnny Cash

Single by Johnny Cash

from the album Johnny Cash with His Hot and Blue Guitar!
- B-side: "So Doggone Lonesome"
- Released: December 15, 1955
- Recorded: July 30, 1955
- Studio: Sun (Memphis, Tennessee)
- Genre: Country; rockabilly; rock and roll
- Length: 2:50
- Label: Sun
- Songwriter: Johnny Cash
- Producer: Sam Phillips

Johnny Cash singles chronology
"Hey, Porter" (1955)	"Folsom Prison Blues" (1955)	"I Walk the Line" (1956)

"Folsom Prison Blues" is a song by American singer-songwriter Johnny Cash, based on material composed by Gordon Jenkins. Written in 1953, it was first recorded and released as a single in 1955, and later included on his debut studio album Johnny Cash with His Hot and Blue Guitar! (1957), as the album's 11th track. The song combines elements from two popular folk styles, the train song and the prison song, both of which Cash continued to use for the rest of his career. It was one of Cash's signature songs. Additionally, this recording was included on the compilation album All Aboard the Blue Train (1962). In June 2014, Rolling Stone ranked it number 51 on its list of the 100 greatest country songs of all time.

Cash performed the song live to a crowd of inmates at California's Folsom State Prison in 1968 for his live album At Folsom Prison (1968), released through Columbia Records. This version became a number-one hit on the country music charts and reached number 32 on the Billboard Hot 100 in the same year. This version also won the Grammy Award for Best Country Vocal Performance, Male, at the 11th Annual Grammy Awards in 1969.

== Original 1955 recording ==
Cash was inspired to write this song after seeing the movie Inside the Walls of Folsom Prison (1951) while serving in West Germany in the United States Air Force at Landsberg, Bavaria (itself the location of a famous prison). Cash recounted how he came up with the line "But I shot a man in Reno, just to watch him die": "I sat with my pen in my hand, trying to think up the worst reason a person could have for killing another person, and that's what came to mind."

Cash was accused of taking the melody for the song from Gordon Jenkins's 1953 Seven Dreams concept album, specifically the song "Crescent City Blues". Jenkins was not credited on the original record, which was issued by Sun Records. In the early 1970s, after the song became popular, Cash paid Jenkins a settlement around US$75,000 following a lawsuit.

"Folsom Prison Blues" was recorded at the Sun Studio in Memphis, Tennessee, on July 30, 1955. The producer was Sam Phillips, and the musicians were Cash (vocals, guitar), Luther Perkins (guitar), and Marshall Grant (bass). As with other songs recorded during his early Sun Records sessions, Cash had no drummer in the studio, but replicated the snare drum sound by inserting a piece of paper (like a dollar bill) under the guitar strings and strumming the snare rhythm on his guitar. The song's sound has been described as country, rockabilly, and rock and roll. The song was released as a single with another song recorded at the same session, "So Doggone Lonesome". Early in 1956, both sides reached number four on the Billboard C&W Best Sellers chart.

When photographer Jim Marshall asked Cash why the song's main character was serving time in California's Folsom Prison after shooting a man in Reno, Nevada, he responded, "That's called poetic license."

In 2001, the 1955 original version of "Folsom Prison Blues" on Sun Records by Johnny Cash was inducted into the Grammy Hall of Fame. The song date listed was 1956.

== Live 1968 recording ==
"Folsom Prison Blues" (live)

Single by Johnny Cash

from the album At Folsom Prison
- B-side: "The Folk Singer"
- Released: April 30, 1968
- Recorded: January 13, 1968
- Venue: Folsom State Prison (Folsom, California)
- Genre: Country; rockabilly
- Length: 2:42
- Label: Columbia
- Songwriter: Johnny Cash
- Producer: Bob Johnston

Johnny Cash singles chronology
"Rosanna's Going Wild" (1967)	"Folsom Prison Blues" (live) (1968)	"Daddy Sang Bass" (1968)

"Folsom Prison Blues" excerpt
From the album At Folsom Prison, the most popular live version of the song.

Cash opened almost all of his concerts with "Folsom Prison Blues" after greeting the audience with his trademark introduction, "Hello, I'm Johnny Cash," for decades. Cash performed the song at Folsom State Prison on January 13, 1968, which was recorded and later released as a live album titled At Folsom Prison. That opening version of the song is more up-tempo than the original Sun recording. According to Michael Streissguth, the cheering from the audience following the line "But I shot a man in Reno / just to watch him die" was added in postproduction. According to a special feature on the DVD release of the 2005 biopic Walk the Line, the prisoners avoided cheering at any of Cash's comments about the prison, fearing reprisal from guards. The performance again featured Cash, Perkins, and Grant, as on the original recording, together with W. S. Holland (drums).

Released as a single, the live version reached number one on the country singles chart, and number 32 on the Hot 100, in 1968. Pitchfork Media placed this live version at number eight on its list of "the 200 Greatest Songs of the 1960s". The live performance of the song won Cash the Grammy Award for Best Country Vocal Performance, Male, the first of four he won in his career, at the 1969 Grammy Awards.

== Chart performance ==
Original version

Chart (1956)	Peak position
US Hot Country Songs (Billboard)	4
US Billboard Best Sellers in Stores	5
US Billboard Most Played in Juke Boxes	5
US Billboard Most Played by Jockeys	4

Live version

Chart (1968)	Peak position
Canadian RPM Country Tracks	1
Canadian RPM Top Singles	17
US Hot Country Songs (Billboard)	1
US Billboard Hot 100	32
US Billboard Adult Contemporary	39

== Certifications ==
Region	Certification	Certified units/sales
United Kingdom (BPI)	Gold	400,000^{‡}
^{‡} Sales+streaming figures based on certification alone.

== In popular culture ==
- Cold Case used the song in season two, episode four, as part of the case.
- James Gunn used the song in his film The Suicide Squad (2021), during its opening sequence.
- The video game Mafia 3 features the 1968 live version of the song.
- Johnny Cash and the song are referenced in George Jones' 1985 single "Who's Gonna Fill Their Shoes" with the line "A Man In Black" and "Folsom Prison Blues".
- Season two, episode 19 of Supernatural was named after this song.
- Sawyer Hill frequently performs a cover of this song.
