= Johnny Cash albums discography =

Recording collections by American singer

Johnny Cash discography
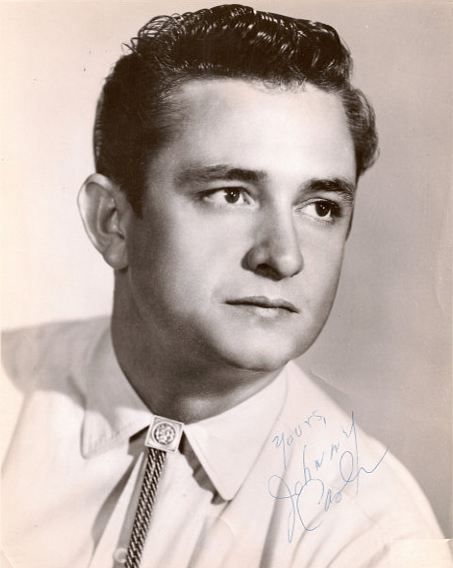
- Johnny Cash Promotional Photo; Sun Records 1955
- Studio albums: 68
- Soundtrack albums: 4
- Live albums: 16
- Compilation albums: 105
- Singles: 14
- Video albums: 54
- Tribute albums: 19

The albums discography of American singer Johnny Cash spans his lengthy career, from 1954 to 2003. It includes the release of 130 albums, most of them for Columbia Records. Over the years, Cash also collaborated with many of the industry's most notable artists.

== Studio albums ==
=== 1950s ===
Title	Details	Peak positions
Title	Details	US
Johnny Cash with His Hot and Blue Guitar!	Release date: October 14, 1957; Label: Sun; Format: LP	—
The Fabulous Johnny Cash	Release date: November 3, 1958; Label: Columbia; Format: LP	19
Hymns by Johnny Cash	Released: March 2, 1959; Label: Columbia; Format: LP	—
Songs of Our Soil	Released: July 6, 1959; Label: Columbia; Format: LP	—
"—" denotes releases that did not chart

=== 1960s ===
Title	Details	Peak chart positions			Certifications (sales thresholds)
Title	Details	US Country	US	UK	Certifications (sales thresholds)
Now, There Was a Song!	Released: May 2, 1960; Label: Columbia; Format: LP	—	—	—	
Ride This Train	Released: August 1, 1960; Label: Columbia; Format: LP	—	—	—	
Hymns from the Heart	Released: April 2, 1962; Label: Columbia; Format: LP	—	—	—	
The Sound of Johnny Cash	Released: June 4, 1962; Label: Columbia; Format: LP	—	—	—	
Blood, Sweat and Tears	Released: January 7, 1963; Label: Columbia; Format: LP	—	80	—	
The Christmas Spirit	Released: November 11, 1963; Label: Columbia; Format: LP	—	7		
Keep on the Sunny Side (with the Carter Family)	Released: April 6, 1964; Label: Columbia; Format: LP	—	—		
I Walk the Line	Released: June 22, 1964; Label: Columbia; Format: LP	1	53	—	RIAA: Gold; BPI: Silver
Bitter Tears: Ballads of the American Indian	Released: October 26, 1964; Label: Columbia; Format: LP	2	47	—	
Orange Blossom Special	Released: February 22, 1965; Label: Columbia; Format: LP	3	49	—	
Johnny Cash Sings the Ballads of the True West	Released: August 2, 1965; Label: Columbia; Format: LP	—	—	—	
Everybody Loves a Nut	Released: May 2, 1966; Label: Columbia; Format: LP	5	88	28	
Happiness Is You	Released: October 10, 1966; Label: Columbia; Format: LP	10	—	—	
Carryin' On with Johnny Cash and June Carter (with June Carter)	Released: August 7, 1967; Label: Columbia; Format: LP	5	194	—	
From Sea to Shining Sea	Released: January 15, 1968; Label: Columbia; Format: LP	9	—	40	
The Holy Land	Released: January 6, 1969; Label: Columbia; Format: LP	6	54	—	
"—" denotes releases that did not chart

=== 1970s ===
Title	Details	Peak chart positions					Certifications (sales thresholds)
Title	Details	US Country	US	AUS	CAN	UK	Certifications (sales thresholds)
Hello, I'm Johnny Cash	Released: January 26, 1970; Label: Columbia	1	6	9	3	6	RIAA: Gold
Man in Black	Released: May 31, 1971; Label: Columbia	1	56	—	43	18	
A Thing Called Love	Released: April 3, 1972; Label: Columbia	2	112	—	—	8	
America: A 200-Year Salute in Story and Song	Released: August 7, 1972; Label: Columbia	3	176	—	—	—	
The Johnny Cash Family Christmas	Released: December 4, 1972; Label: Columbia	—	—	—	—	—	
Any Old Wind That Blows	Released: January 15, 1973; Label: Columbia	5	188	—	—	—	
Johnny Cash and His Woman (with June Carter Cash)	Released: September 3, 1973; Label: Columbia	32	—	—	—	—	
Ragged Old Flag	Released: May 6, 1974; Label: Columbia	16	—	—	—	—	
The Junkie and the Juicehead Minus Me	Released: September 23, 1974; Label: Columbia	48	—	—	—	—	
The Johnny Cash Children's Album	Released: January 1, 1975; Label: Columbia	—	—	—	—	—	
Johnny Cash Sings Precious Memories	Released: January 2, 1975; Label: Columbia	—	—	—	—	—	
John R. Cash	Released: April 28, 1975; Label: Columbia	—	—	—	—	—	
Look at Them Beans	Released: September 29, 1975; Label: Columbia	38	—	—	—	—	
One Piece at a Time	Released: May 17, 1976; Label: Columbia	2	185	—	—	49	
The Last Gunfighter Ballad	Released: January 1, 1977; Label: Columbia	29	—	—	—	—	
The Rambler	Released: June 27, 1977; Label: Columbia	31	—	—	—	—	
I Would Like to See You Again	Released: April 10, 1978; Label: Columbia	23	—	—	—	—	
Gone Girl	Released: November 13, 1978; Label: Columbia	—	—	—	—	—	
Silver	Released: August 13, 1979; Label: Columbia	28	—	—	—	—	
A Believer Sings the Truth	Released: October 1979; Label: Cachet	43	—	—	10	—	
Sings with the BC Goodpasture Christian School	Released: 1979; Label: Cachet	—	—	—	—	—	
"—" denotes releases that did not chart

=== 1980s ===
Title	Details	Peak chart positions				Certifications
Title	Details	US Country	US	AUS	CAN Country	Certifications
Rockabilly Blues	Released: September 22, 1980; Label: Columbia	—	—	—	23	
Classic Christmas	Released: November 3, 1980; Label: Columbia	—	—	—	—	
The Baron	Released: June 1, 1981; Label: Columbia	24	—	54	—	
The Adventures of Johnny Cash	Released: September 6, 1982; Label: Columbia	—	—	—	—	
Johnny 99	Released: August 29, 1983; Label: Columbia	—	—	—	—	
Highwayman (with Waylon Jennings, Willie Nelson, and Kris Kristofferson)	Released: May 6, 1985; Label: Columbia	1	92	5	—	RIAA: Platinum; ARIA: Platinum
Rainbow	Released: October 28, 1985; Label: Columbia	—	—	—	—	
Heroes (with Waylon Jennings)	Released: May 19, 1986; Label: Columbia	13	—	—	—	
Class of '55: Memphis Rock and Roll Homecoming (with Carl Perkins, Jerry Lee Lewis, and Roy Orbison)	Released: May 26, 1986; Label: America	15	87	—	—	
Believe in Him	Released: July 21, 1986; Label: Word	—	—	—	—	
Johnny Cash Is Coming to Town	Released: April 13, 1987; Label: Mercury	36	—	—	—	
Classic Cash: Hall of Fame Series	Released: September 19, 1988; Label: Mercury	—	—	—	—	
Water from the Wells of Home	Released: October 10, 1988; Label: Mercury	48	—	—	—	
"—" denotes releases that did not chart

=== 1990s ===
Title	Details	Peak chart positions					Certifications
Title	Details	US Country	US	AUS	CAN Country	CAN	Certifications
Boom Chicka Boom	Released: January 22, 1990; Label: Mercury	48	—	—	—	—	
Highwayman 2 (with Waylon Jennings, Willie Nelson, and Kris Kristofferson)	Released: February 27, 1990; Label: Columbia	4	79	9	—	—	ARIA: Gold
The Mystery of Life	Released: February 19, 1991; Label: Mercury	70	—	—	—	—	
Country Christmas	Released: September 20, 1991; Label: Delta	52	—	—	—	—	
American Recordings	Released: April 26, 1994; Label: American Recordings	23	110	—	9	72	BPI: Silver
The Road Goes On Forever (with Waylon Jennings, Willie Nelson, and Kris Kristofferson)	Released: April 4, 1995; Label: Liberty	42	—	—	—	—	
American II: Unchained	Released: November 5, 1996; Label: American Recordings	26	170	—	—	—	
"—" denotes releases that did not chart

=== 2000s ===
Title	Details	Peak chart positions					Certifications (sales thresholds)
Title	Details	US Country	US	AUS	CAN	UK	Certifications (sales thresholds)
American III: Solitary Man	Released: October 17, 2000; Label: American Recordings	11	88	—	—	—	BPI: Gold
American IV: The Man Comes Around	Released: November 5, 2002; Label: American Recordings	2	22	—	—	40	RIAA: Platinum; BPI: Platinum; MC: Platinum
My Mother's Hymn Book	Released: April 6, 2004; Label: American Recordings	27	194	—	—	—	
American V: A Hundred Highways	Released: July 4, 2006; Label: American Recordings	1	1	25	4	9	RIAA: Gold; BPI: Gold; MC: Gold
"—" denotes releases that did not chart

=== 2010s–2020s ===
Title	Details	Peak chart positions					Certifications (sales thresholds)
Title	Details	US Country	US	AUS	CAN	UK	Certifications (sales thresholds)
American VI: Ain't No Grave	Released: February 23, 2010; Label: American Recordings	2	3	22	4	9	BPI: Silver
Out Among the Stars	Released: March 21, 2014; Label: Columbia, Legacy Recordings	1	3	4	2	4	BPI: Silver
Songwriter	Released: June 28, 2024; Label: Mercury Nashville, UMe	23	92	64	—	42	
"—" denotes releases that did not chart

== Live albums ==
Title	Details	Peak chart positions				Certifications (sales thresholds)
Title	Details	US Country	US	AUS	CAN	Certifications (sales thresholds)
At Folsom Prison	Released: May 6, 1968; Label: Columbia	1	13	—	27	RIAA: 3× Platinum; BPI: Gold; MC: Platinum
At San Quentin	Released: June 16, 1969; Label: Columbia	1	1	12	1	RIAA: 3× Platinum; ARIA: Platinum; BPI: Gold; MC: Platinum
The Johnny Cash Show	Released: October 19, 1970; Label: Columbia	1	44	—	36	RIAA: Gold
På Österåker	Released: September 1, 1973; Label: Columbia	—	—	—	—	
Strawberry Cake	Released: March 1, 1976; Label: Columbia	33	—	—	—	
The Survivors (with Jerry Lee Lewis and Carl Perkins)	Released: April 23, 1982; Label: Columbia	21	—	—	—	
Koncert v Praze (In Prague-Live)	Released: October 1, 1983; Label: Columbia	—	—	—	—	
VH1 Storytellers: Johnny Cash & Willie Nelson (with Willie Nelson)	Released: June 6, 1998; Label: American Recordings	25	56	—	—	
At Madison Square Garden	Released: August 27, 2002; Label: Columbia	39	196	—	—	
A Concert Behind Prison Walls	Released: September 23, 2003; Label: Eagle	—	—	—	—	
Live from Austin, TX	Released: November 1, 2005; Label: New West Records	—	—	—	—	
The Great Lost Performance - Live at the Paramount Theatre, Asbury Park, New Jersey	Released: July 24, 2007; Label: Island	60	—	—	—	
Live in Ireland	Released: January 1, 2009; Label: Island Def Jam	—	—	—	—	
Man in Black: Johnny Cash Live in Denmark 1971	Released: December 4, 2015; Label: Columbia	—	—	—	—	ARIA: 5× Platinum (DVD)
A Night to Remember	Released: September 30, 2020; Label: Third Man Records/Columbia/Legacy	—	—	—	—	
Bear's Sonic Journals: At the Carousel Ballroom, April 24, 1968	Released: October 29, 2021; Label: Owsley Stanley Foundation	—	—	—	—	
"—" denotes releases that did not chart

== Soundtrack albums ==
Title	Details	Peak chart positions	
Title	Details	US Country	US
Little Fauss and Big Halsy	Released: November 23, 1970; Label: Columbia	—	—
I Walk the Line	Released:November 23, 1970; Label: Columbia	9	176
The Gospel Road	Released: April 2, 1973; Label: Columbia	12	—
Return to the Promised Land (with June Carter Cash)	Released: November 21, 2000; Label: Renaissance	—	—
"—" denotes releases that did not chart

== Compilation albums ==
=== 1950s ===
Title	Details
Johnny Cash Sings the Songs That Made Him Famous	Released: December 1, 1958; Label: Sun; Format: LP
Greatest!	Released: October 19, 1959; Label: Sun; Format: LP

=== 1960s ===
Title	Details	Peak chart positions		Certifications (sales thresholds)
Title	Details	US Country	US	Certifications (sales thresholds)
Johnny Cash Sings Hank Williams	Released: September 5, 1960; Label: Sun; Format: LP	—	—	
Now Here's Johnny Cash	Released: June 26, 1961; Label: Sun; Format: LP	—	—	
All Aboard the Blue Train with Johnny Cash	Released: December 3, 1962; Label: Sun; Format: LP	—	—	RIAA: Gold
Ring of Fire: The Best of Johnny Cash	Release date: July 8, 1963; Label: Columbia	1	26	
Original Sun Sound of Johnny Cash	Released: November 23, 1964; Label: Sun; Format: LP	—	—	
Mean as Hell	Release date: 1965; Label: Columbia Records	4	—	
Johnny Cash's Greatest Hits	Release date: 1967; Label: Columbia Records	1	82	RIAA: 2× Platinum; MC: Platinum
Old Golden Throat	Release date: 1968; Label: Columbia Records	—	—	
Legends and Love Songs	Release date: 1968; Label: Columbia Records	—	—	
Heart of Cash	Release date: 1968; Label: Columbia Records	—	—	
Golden Sounds of Country Music	Release date: 1968; Label: Harmony Records	—	—	
Get Rhythm	Release date: 1969; Label: Sun Records	30	164	
Original Golden Hits, Volume I	Release date: 1969; Label: Sun Records	4	95	
Story Songs of the Trains and Rivers	Release date: 1969; Label: Sun Records	2	197	
More of Old Golden Throat	Release date: 1969; Label: Columbia Records	—	—	
This Is Johnny Cash	Release date: 1969; Label: Harmony Records	—	—	
"—" denotes releases that did not chart

=== 1970s ===
Title	Details	Peak chart positions				Certifications (sales thresholds)
Title	Details	US Country	US	AUS	CAN	Certifications (sales thresholds)
Showtime	Release date: 1970; Label: Sun Records	14	181	—	—	
The World of Johnny Cash	Release date: May 1, 1970; Label: Columbia Records	2	54	22	26	RIAA: Gold
The Singing Storyteller	Release date: 1970; Label: Sun Records	45	186	—	—	
Original Golden Hits, Volume II	Release date: 1970; Label: Sun Records	3	98	—	—	
Johnny Cash: The Legend	Release date: 1970; Label: Sun Records	—	—	—	—	
The Rough Cut King of Country Music	Release date: 1970; Label: Sun Records	—	—	—	—	
Sunday Down South	Release date: 1970; Label: Sun Records	—	—	—	—	
The Walls of a Prison	Release date: 1970; Label: Harmony Records	—	—	—	—	
Johnny Cash: The Man, His World, His Music	Release date: 1971; Label: Sun Records	—	—	—	—	
Original Golden Hits, Volume III	Release date: 1971; Label: Sun Records	—	—	—	—	
The Johnny Cash Collection: Greatest Hits Volume II	Release date: 1971; Label: Columbia Records	5	94	—	—	RIAA: Platinum
The Mighty Johnny Cash	Release date: 1971; Label: Hallmark Cards	—	—	—	—	
International Superstar	Release date: 1972; Label: Columbia Records	—	—	—	—	
Understand Your Man	Release date: 1972; Label: Harmony Records	—	—	—	—	
Big River	Release date: 1972; Label: Pickwick 33 Records	—	—	—	—	
Give My Love to Rose	Release date: 1972; Label: Harmony Records	—	—	—	—	
The Johnny Cash Songbook	Release date: 1972; Label: Harmony Records	43	—	—	—	
Sunday Morning Coming Down	Release date: 1972; Label: Columbia Records	35	—	—	—	
Ballads of the American Indian	Release date: 1973; Label: Harmony Records	—	—	—	—	
This Is Johnny Cash	Release date: 1973; Label: Harmony Records	—	—	—	—	
Johnny Cash the King/Tammy Wynette the Queen	Release date: 1973; Label: Columbia Records	—	—	—	—	
Five Feet High and Rising	Release date: 1974; Label: Columbia Records	33	—	—	—	
Destination Victoria Station	Release date: 1975; Label: Columbia Records	—	—	—	—	
The Best of Johnny Cash	Release date: 1977; Label: Columbia Records	—	—	37	—	
Greatest Hits, Vol. 3	Release date: 1978; Label: Columbia Records	49	—	—	—	
The Unissued Johnny Cash	Release date: 1978; Label: Bear Family Records	—	—	—	—	
Johnny & June (with June Carter Cash)	Release date: 1978; Label: Bear Family Records	—	—	—	—	
Tall Man	Release date: 1979; Label: Bear Family Records	—	—	—	—	
"—" denotes releases that did not chart

=== 1980s ===
Title	Details
I Believe	Release date: 1984; Label: Cachet/Columbia Records
Encore	Release date: 1981; Label: Columbia Records
Biggest Hits	Release date: 1984; Label: Columbia Records
Up Through the Years, 1955-1957	Release date: 1986; Label: Bear Family Records
Columbia Records 1958-1986	Release date: 1987; Label: Columbia Records

=== 1990s ===
Title	Details	Peak chart positions				Certifications (sales thresholds)
Title	Details	US Country	US	AUS	CAN Country	Certifications (sales thresholds)
12 Giant Hits	Release date: 1990; Label: CBS Records	—	—	—	—	
The Man in Black 1954-1958	Release date: 1990; Label: Bear Family Records	—	—	—	—	
Come Along and Ride this Train	Release date: 1991; Label: Bear Family Records	—	—	—	—	
The Man in Black 1959-1962	Release date: 1991; Label: Bear Family Records	—	—	—	—	
Patriot	Release date: 1991; Label: Columbia Records	67	—	—	—	
The Best of Johnny Cash	Release date: 1991; Label: Curb Records	—	196	—	—	RIAA: Gold
The Essential Johnny Cash 1955-1983	Release date: 1992; Label: Legacy Recordings	—	—	—	—	
Wanted Man	Release date: 1994; Label: Mercury Records	—	—	—	15	
Super Hits	Release date: 1994; Label: Legacy Recordings	—	166	48	—	RIAA: Platinum
The Man in Black 1963-1969	Release date: March 1994; Label: Bear Family Records	—	—	37	—	
Johnny Cash: The Hits	Release date: 1996; Label: Mercury Records	75	—	—	—	
The Best of Johnny Cash	Release date: 1998; Label: Mercury Records	—	—	—	—	
Johnny Cash: Crazy Country	Release date: 1998; Label: Legacy Recordings	—	—	—	—	
The Man In Black - His Greatest Hits	Release date: 1999; Label: Columbia Records	63	—	—	—	
16 Biggest Hits	Release date: 1999; Label: Legacy Recordings	18	65	—	—	RIAA: 2× Platinum
"—" denotes releases that did not chart

=== 2000s ===
Title	Details	Peak chart positions				Certifications (sales thresholds)
Title	Details	US Country	US	AUS	CAN	Certifications (sales thresholds)
The Mercury Years	Release date: 2000; Label: Mercury Records	—	—	—	—	
Love, God, Murder	Release date: 2000; Label: Legacy Recordings	67	—	—	—	
Johnny Cash and the Tennessee Two: Roads Less Traveled	Release date: 2001; Label: Varèse Sarabande	—	—	—	—	
16 Biggest Hits: Volume II	Release date: 2001; Label: Legacy Recordings	—	—	—	—	
Johnny Cash & Friends	Release date: 2002; Label: Mercury Records	—	—	—	—	
The Essential Johnny Cash	Release date: 2002; Label: Legacy Recordings	16	35	11	—	RIAA: 3× Platinum; ARIA: 4× Platinum; BPI: Gold; MC: 2× Platinum
The Legend of Johnny Cash: First Original Hits	Release date: 2002; Label: K-tel	66	—	—	—	
Johnny Cash Sings His Best: 40 Original Hits	Release date: 2002; Label: TeeVee	71	—	—	—	
20th Century Masters – The Millennium Collection: The Best of Johnny Cash	Release date: 2002; Label: Mercury Records	47	—	—	—	
The Heart of a Legend	Release date: 2002; Label: Madacy Entertainment	49	—	—	—	
A Boy Named Sue and Other Story Songs	Release date: 2002; Label: Sony Music Entertainment	—	—	—	—	
Live Recordings from the Louisiana Hayride (live)	Release date: 2003; Label: Scena	—	—	—	—	
Unearthed	Release date: 2003; Label: American Recordings	33	—	—	—	RIAA: Gold
Christmas with Johnny Cash	Release date: 2003; Label: Legacy Recordings	58	—	—	—	
Life	Release date: 2004; Label: Legacy Recordings	—	—	—	—	
Johnny Cash Live Recordings	Release date: 2004; Label: Laserlight	—	—	—	—	
The Complete Sun Recordings, 1955-1958	Release date: 2005; Label: Time–Life	52	—	—	—	
Walking the Line: The Legendary Sun Recordings	Release date: 2005; Label: Metro Records	66	—	—	—	BPI: Gold
The Legend	Release date: 2005; Label: Legacy Recordings	31	173	—	—	RIAA: Gold
The Legend of Johnny Cash	Release date: 2005; Label: Island Records	2	5	10	5	RIAA: 2× Platinum; ARIA: Gold; BPI: 2× Platinum
16 Biggest Hits: Johnny Cash & June Carter Cash	Release date: 2006; Label: Legacy Recordings	26	126	—	—	
Golden Legends: Johnny Cash	Release date: 2006; Label: Madacy Entertainment	70	—	—	—	
June Carter and Johnny Cash: Duets	Release date: 2006; Label: Sony BMG	—	—	32	—	
Personal File (2-CD set)	Release date: 2006; Label: Legacy Recordings	22	108	68	79	
Country Legends: I Walk the Line	Release date: 2006; Label: BCI	44	—	—	—	
The Legend of Johnny Cash Vol. II	Release date: 2006; Label: Island Records	28	144	86	80	
JC: Johnny Cash	Release date: 2006; Label: Sun Records	26	109	—	—	
Johnny Cash Disk 1	Release date: 2006; Label: Madacy Special Products	—	—	—	—	
More Songs from Johnny's Personal File	Release date: 2007; Label: Columbia Records	—	—	—	—	
Cash - Ultimate Gospel	Release date: 2007; Label: Legacy Recordings	34	—	—	—	
Forever Johnny Cash	Release date: 2007; Label: Sun Records	58	—	—	18	
The Best of the Johnny Cash TV Show: 1969-1971	Release date: 2008; Label: Legacy Recordings	47	—	—	—	ARIA: 2× Platinum (DVD)
Playlist: The Very Best of Johnny Cash	Release date: 2008; Label: Sony BMG	37	140	—	—	
The Gospel Music of Johnny Cash	Release date: 2008; Label: Gaither Music Group	56	—	—	—	
America	Release date: 2008; Label: Legacy Recordings	50	—	—	—	
The Ultimate Collection	Release date: 2008; Label: Metro Records	—	—	—	—	BPI: Silver
"—" denotes releases that did not chart

=== 2010s–2020s ===
Title	Details	Peak chart positions	
Title	Details	US Country	US
Icon: Johnny Cash	Release date: 2010; Label: Mercury Records	45	—
The Great Seventies Recordings	Release date: 2010; Label: Reader's Digest / Sony Music Custom Marketing Group	—	—
Bootleg Vol II: From Memphis to Hollywood	Release date: 2011; Label: Columbia Records/Legacy	33	—
Bootleg Vol III: Live Around the World	Release date: 2011; Label: Columbia Records/Legacy	42	—
Unseen Cash	Release date: 2012; Label: Bear Family Records	—	—
The Essential Collection	Release date: 2012; Label: Metro Records	—	—
Bootleg Vol IV: The Soul of Truth	Release date: 2012; Label: Columbia Records/Legacy	—	—
Opus Collection	Release date: 2012; Label: Starbucks	6	28
The Greatest: The Number Ones	Release date: 2012; Label: Columbia Records/Legacy	28	125
The Greatest: Duets	Release date: 2012; Label: Columbia Records/Legacy	71	—
The Complete Columbia Album Collection	Release date: 2012; Label: Columbia Records/Legacy	—	—
Country: Johnny Cash	Release date: 2012; Label: Columbia Records/Legacy	61	—
LIFE Unheard	Release date: 2013; Label: Sony Music Entertainment	32	200
Every Song Tells a Story (with Willie Nelson)	Release date: 2013; Label: Sony Music Entertainment	54	—
The Classic Christmas Album	Release date: 2013; Label: Legacy Recordings	48	—
The Bootleg Series Vol. 15: Travelin' Thru, 1967–1969 (with Bob Dylan)	Release date: 2019; Label: Sony Legacy	—	27
Bob Dylan - 50th Anniversary Collection 1969 (with Bob Dylan)	Release date: 2019; Label: Columbia/Sony Music/Legacy	—	—
The Complete Mercury Recordings 1986 - 1991	Release date: 2020; Label: Mercury Nashville	—	—
Easy Rider: The Best of the Mercury Recordings	Release date: 2020; Label: Mercury Nashville	—	—
Classic Cash: Hall of Fame Series - Early Mixes	Release date: 2020; Label: Mercury Nashville	—	25
Johnny Cash and the Royal Philharmonic Orchestra (with the Royal Philharmonic Orchestra)	Release date: 2020; Label: Columbia Records/Legacy	—	58
"—" denotes releases that did not chart

== Other appearances ==
=== Studio ===
Year	Song(s)	Album
1979	"Nasty Dan" (with Oscar the Grouch) "Five Feet High and Rising" (with Biff)	Children's TV Workshop Stars; Come Out on Sesame Street
1982	"The General Lee"	Dukes of Hazzard soundtrack
1983	"The Love That Never Failed"	Star Spangled Country
1986	"Let America Be America Again" (with Will D. Campbell, Willie Nelson, Jessi Colter, and Waylon Jennings)	They Come to America
1994	"Folsom Prison Blues" (with Brooks & Dunn) "Forever Young"	Red Hot + Country
1995	"Were You There (When They Crucified My Lord)" "Redemption"	Silent Witness, Vol. 1
1996	"In Your Mind"	Dead Man Walking soundtrack
1996	"Time of the Preacher" (with Krist Novoselic, Sean Kinney, Kim Thayil, and John Carter Cash)	Twisted Willie
1998	"In the Garden"	The Apostle soundtrack
1998	"I Washed My Face in the Morning Dew"	Real: The Tom T. Hall Project
2000	"I'm on Fire"	Badlands: A Tribute to Bruce Springsteen's Nebraska
2001	"I Dreamed About Momma Last Night"	Timeless: A Tribute to Hank Williams
2002	"For You" (with Dave Matthews)	We Were Soldiers soundtrack
2004	"Engine One-Forty-Three" "Hold Fast to the Right"	The Unbroken Circle - The Musical Heritage Of The Carter Family
2006	"Unclouded Day"	Voice of the Spirit, Gospel of the South

=== Live ===
Year	Song(s)	Album
1972	"I See Men as Trees Walking"	Jesus Sound Explosion
1974	"The Last Supper"	Live At Spre·e Album
1976	"Ragged Old Flag"	It's Time to Pray, America
1984	"Hey Porter", "Luther Played the Boogie", and "Big River"	Louisiana Hayride Saturday Nite
1994	"Folsom Prison Blues" (live at the Grammy Legend Awards on December 5, 1990)	Grammy's Greatest Country Moments, Volume I
2000	"City of New Orleans" (as The Highwaymen), "Folsom Prison Blues", "I've Always Been Crazy" (as The Highwaymen), and "Best of All Possible Worlds" (as The Highwaymen)	Farm Aid, Volume One: Live
2000	"So Doggone Lonesome", "I Walk the Line", and "Get Rhythm"	The Big "D" Jamboree Live, Volumes 1 & 2
2001	"Five Feet High and Rising" and "Rock Island Line"	The Original Louisiana Hayride Archives - Classic Country Radio Vol.1
2004	"Get Rhythm", "I Walk the Line", and "So Doggone Lonesome"	Best of Rockabilly
2005	"Orange Blossom Special"	Grand Ole Opry Live Classics - Hit the Road
2006	"Folsom Prison Blues"	Grand Ole Opry Live Classics - Great Number 1 Hits
2011	"Big River"	Rock And Roll Hall Of Fame Volume 2: 1992-1994
2011	"Ring of Fire"	Grand Ole Opry Classic Collection - Classic Hits
2011	"Jackson"	Grand Ole Opry Classic Collection - Duets
2011	"Folsom Prison Blues", "Ain't No Good Chain Gang" (with Waylon Jennings)	Grand Ole Opry Classic Collection - Outlaws
2013	"I Got Stripes"	Boy Meets Girls TV Shows Vol. 1
2015	"I Walk the Line"	Grand Ole Opry Live Classics - Hall of Famers
2015	"Folsom Prison Blues"	Grand Ole Opry Live Classics - Timeless Hits
2015	"Will the Circle Be Unbroken" (with The Carter Family)	The Winding Stream - The Carters, The Cashes And The Course Of Country Music

=== Guest appearances ===
Year	Song(s)	Artist(s)	Album
1961	"A Day in the Canyon"	Andre Kostelanetz	The Lure of the Grand Canyon
1969	"Girl from the North Country"	Bob Dylan	Nashville Skyline
1971	"A Front Row Seat to Hear Ole Johnny Sing"	Shel Silverstein	Freakin' at the Freakers Ball
1972	"A Song to Mama" "The World Needs a Melody"	The Carter Family	Traveling Minstral Band
1972	"Amazing Grace"	The Evangel Temple Choir	The Evangel Temple Choir
1975	"Gospel Ship" "Song to Woody" "Hey Porter"	The Earl Scruggs Revue	Anniversary Special, Vol. 1
1976	"I Still Miss Someone" "My Ship Will Sail" (background vocals)	The Earl Scruggs Revue	Anniversary Special, Vol. 2
1976	"No Earthly Good"	The Oak Ridge Boys	Old Fashioned, Down Home, Hand Clappin'; Foot Stompin' Southern Style Gospel Quartet Music
1976	"My Ship Will Sail"	The Carter Family	Country's First Family
1976	"Love is My Refuge"	Jack Routh	
1979	"Jealous Loving Heart" "Soldier's Last Letter"	Ernest Tubb	The Legend and the Legacy
1979	"Six Gun Shooting" "Help Him, Jesus" "The Death of Me"	Levon Helm; Emmylou Harris; Charlie Daniels	The Legend of Jesse James
1980	"What's Good for You (Should Be Alright for Me)" "Mother Maybelle"	Marty Stuart; Curly Seckler; The Nashville Grass	Take a Little Time
1980	"Jordan"	Emmylou Harris; Tony Rice; Ricky Skaggs	Roses in the Snow (Emmylou Harris album)
1981	"Mister Garfield"	Merle Kilgore	
1982	"One More Ride" "Hey Porter" "Get in Line Brother"	Marty Stuart	Busy Bee Cafe
1982	"That's How I Got to Memphis"	Rosanne Cash	Somewhere in the Stars
1983	"I Still Miss Someone"	Bill Monroe	Bill Monroe and Friends
1983	"Love Me Tender"	Julie Andrews	Love Me Tender
1984	"Crazy Old Soldier"	Ray Charles	Friendship
1984	"Suffer Little Children"	Glen Campbell	No More Night
1986	"Be Careful Who You Love (Arthur's Song)"	Waylon Jennings	Sweet Mother Texas
1986	"Better Class of Losers"	John Schneider; Waylon Jennings	Take the Long Way Home (John Schneider album)
1987	"The Ten Commandments of Love"	David Allan Coe	A Matter of Life and Death
1987	"Amazing Grace"	Joanne Cash Yates	Amazing Grace
1988	"Waitin' for a Southern Train"	Jimmy Tittle	Jimmy Tittle
1989	"Jesus is Lord" "I've Been Saved" "Gospel Medley" "How Beautiful Heaven Must Be" "Lord I'm Coming Home"	Joanne Cash Yates	Live
1989	"Life's Railway to Heaven" "Will the Circle Be Unbroken"	Nitty Gritty Dirt Band	Will the Circle Be Unbroken: Volume Two
1989	"Wildwood Flower" "Worried Man Blues" "Ain't Gonna Work Tomorrow" "Church in the Wildwood"	The Carter Family	Wildwood Flower
1989	"Woodcarver"	Sandy Kelly	Kelly's Heroes
1990	"Thoughts on the Flag" (with George Jones and Tom T. Hall) "Guess Things Happen That Way"	Tommy Cash	The 25th Anniversary Album (Tommy Cash album)
1990	"Get Rhythm"	Martin Delray	Get Rhythm
1991	"Man in Black"	One Bad Pig	I Scream Sunday
1992	"Doin' My Time"	Marty Stuart	This One's Gonna Hurt You
1993	"The Wanderer"	U2	Zooropa
1993	"The Devil Comes Back to Georgia"	Charlie Daniels; Travis Tritt; Marty Stuart	Heroes (Mark O'Connor album)
1994	"Tennessee Stud"	Michael Martin Murphey	Horse Legends
1994	"A Comment from Johnny Cash"	Rose Maddox	$35 and a Dream
1994	"The Little Drummer Boy"	Ben Keith	Seven Gates: A Christmas Album by Ben Keith and Friends
1995	"Get Rhythm"	John Stewart	Airdream Believer
1995	"Go Wild" "The Winding Stream"	Carlene Carter	Little Acts of Treason
1995	"Where the Soul Never Dies"	The Cluster Pluckers	Unplucked
1995	"Blistered"	Jimmy Tittle	It's in the Attitude
1996	"Two Old Army Pals" "Give Me Back My Job"	Bono; Willie Nelson; Tom Petty	Go Cat Go! (Carl Perkins album)
1996	"Steel Guitar Rag"	Robby Turner	Man of Steel
1996	"Johnny Cash Hit Medley (Ring of Fire/I Walk the Line/Folsom Prison Blues)" "I Will Rock and Roll with You" "Fly Little Bird" (with John Carter Cash)	Tom Astor	Tom Astor
1996	"It Could Happen Again"	Collin Raye	Christmas: The Gift
1998	"I Walk the Line (Revisited)"	Rodney Crowell	The Houston Kid
1999	"Johnny Cash Outro"	Marty Stuart	The Pilgrim
1999	"Guess Things Happen That Way" "Tribute To A Princess" "Silver Haired Daddy of Mine" "Thoughts on the Flag"	George Jones; Tom T. Hall	Classics (Tommy Cash album)
1999	"Far Side Banks of Jordan"	June Carter Cash	Press On
2000	"Introduction" "Take Me Home"	Ramblin' Jack Elliott	The Ballad of Ramblin' Jack
2001	"Passin' Thru"	Don Henley; Earl Scruggs	Earl Scruggs and Friends
2001	"Big River"	Trick Pony; Waylon Jennings	Trick Pony (Trick Pony album)
2002	"Redemption Song"(guitar only)	Joe Strummer and the Mescaleros	Streetcore
2002	"Tears in the Holston River"	The Nitty Gritty Dirt Band	Will the Circle Be Unbroken, Vol. 3
2003	"September When It Comes"	Rosanne Cash	Rules of Travel
2003	"Keep on the Sunny Side" "The Road to Kaintuck" "Temptation" "Will You Miss Me When I'm Gone" "Wildwood Flower"	June Carter Cash	Wildwood Flower
2003	"The Way-Worn Traveler"	John Carter Cash	Bitter Harvest
2003	"I Still Miss Someone"	Laura Cash White	Among My Souvenirs
2004	"Ballad of a Teenage Queen" "Guess Things Happen That Way"	Jack Clement	Guess Things Happen That Way
2004	"We Ought to Be Ashamed"	Elvis Costello	Almost Blue
2005	"Cowboys and Ladies" (with June Carter Cash) and "Heroes in Black and White"	Kelly Crabb	All My Friends Are Cowboys
2005	"Flesh and Blood"	Jerry Hensley	Cool Breeze Blowin'
2005	"Cuban Soldier" "Jackson" "Far Side Banks of Jordan" "If I Were a Carpenter"	June Carter Cash	Ring of Fire: The Best of June Carter Cash
2006	"The Good Intent"	Rosanne Cash	Black Cadillac
2006	"The Greatest Cowboy of them All" "There Ain't No Good Chain Gang" "I Do Believe" (as The Highwaymen)	Waylon Jennings	Nashville Rebel
2007	"You Just Can't Beat Jesus Christ"	Billy Joe Shaver	Everybody's Brother
2007	"Lower Lights" "When He Comes" "Softly And Tenderly"	Joanne Cash	Gospel
2008	"Woodcarver" "Ring of Fire"	Sandy Kelly	Best of Sandy Kelly
2010	"Why Me Lord?"	Ray Charles	Rare Genius: The Undiscovered Masters
2012	"One Too Many Mornings" (remix by The Avett Brothers)	The Avett Brothers	Chimes of Freedom
2013	"I Ain't Gonna Work Tomorrow"	Carlene Carter	Carter Girl
2017	"Hell, This Ain't Heaven"	John Schneider	Hell, This Ain't Heaven
2019	"Redemption Day"	Sheryl Crow	Threads

== Audiobooks ==
Year Recorded	Book	Author(s)
1990	The Complete New Testament	
1995	Riding for the Brand	Louis L'Amour
1996	The Eye of the Prophet	Kahlil Gibran
1999	Franklin Bible Sessions	

== Video albums ==
Year	Title/Format Information	Certification
1958–1959	At ‘Town Hall Party’: Released: November 15, 1958 (broadcast); August 8, 1959 (broadcast); March 25, 2002 (DVD); Label: NBC/Bear Family Records	
1966	Pete Seeger's Rainbow Quest with June Carter Cash: Released: 1966 (broadcast); March 8, 2005 (DVD); 2022 (streaming); Label: WNJU/Shanachie Records	
1969	The Man, His World, His Music: Released: March 16, 1969 (broadcast); January 23, 1970 (theatrical); 1992 (VHS); 2000 (VHS/DVD); 2002/2005 (DVD); 2014 (streaming); Label: Verité Production/WJRZ Radio/Continental Distributing/Cherry Red Films/Sanctuary Visual Entertainment	US: Gold
1969–1971	The Best of the Johnny Cash TV Show: Released: June 7, 1969 - March 31, 1971 (broadcast); September 18, 2007 (2xDVD); Label: Screen Gems/ABC/Columbia Music Video/Legacy Recordings	US: Platinum
1969	At San Quentin: Legacy Edition (a/k/a Johnny Cash at San Quentin): Released: September 6, 1969 (broadcast); 1988 (VHS); November 14, 2006 (2xCD+DVD); Label: Granada Television/Vestron Video International/Columbia Music Video/Legacy Recordings	
1971	Man In Black: Live In Denmark 1971 (original title Johnny Cash i København): Released: November 26, 1971 (Denmark broadcast); July 11, 2006 (DVD/streaming); 2008 (EU CD+DVD); 2014 (streaming); Label: Columbia Music Video/Legacy Recordings	ARIA: 5× Platinum
1973	Gospel Road: A Story of Jesus (home video title The Gospel Road): Released: March 31, 1973 (theatrical); 1985/1990/1991 (VHS); February 28, 2006 (DVD); 2012 (streaming); Label: 20th Century Fox/Republic Pictures/Inspiration Video/World Wide Video/House of Cash/Godtube	
1973	A Night To Remember: Recorded: May 5, 1973; Released: September 30, 2020 (2xLP+DVD); June 19, 2021 (broadcast/streaming); 2024 (streaming); Label: Third Man Records/Columbia/Legacy/PBS/Sony Music	
1974	Ridin' the Rails: The Great American Train Story: Released: November 22, 1974 (broadcast); 1986 (VHS); June 7, 2005 (DVD); 2021 (streaming); Label: Polygram Video/Rhino Home Video/Warner Music Vision	
1976	The Johnny Cash Christmas Special 1976: Released: December 6, 1976 (broadcast); November 13, 2007 (DVD); Label: Shout! Studios	
1977	A Concert Behind Prison Walls: Released: 1977 (broadcast); 1982 (VHS); 2003 (VHS/DVD); 2004 (DVD+CD); 2014 (streaming); Label: ABA Productions/Media Home Entertainment/Eagle Vision	
1977	The Johnny Cash Christmas Special 1977: Released: November 30, 1977 (broadcast); November 13, 2007 (DVD); Label: Shout! Studios	
1978	The Johnny Cash Christmas Special 1978: Released: December 6, 1978 (broadcast); October 7, 2008 (DVD); Label: Shout! Studios	
1979	Live in Las Vegas, 1979: Recorded: 1979 (Century 21 Real Estate convention); Released: January 14, 2020 (streaming); Label: House of Cash/Columbia/Legacy/Sony Music	
1979	The Johnny Cash Christmas Special 1979: Released: December 6, 1979 (broadcast); October 7, 2008 (DVD); Label: Shout! Studios	
1976–1979	The Johnny Cash Christmas Specials 1976-1979: Released: 1976-1979 (broadcast); October 7, 2008 (4xDVD box set); Label: Shout! Studios	
1980	CBS TV Anniversary Special: The First 25 Years: Released: March 12, 1980 (broadcast); August 2, 2005 (DVD); Label: Columbia/Legacy	
1981	Live in London: Released: June 12, 1981 (broadcast), 1985/1988 (VHS); Label: BBC/BBC Video/Continental Video	
1982	Johnny Cash's America: Live at the Kennedy Center Washington, DC 1982: Released: August 21, 1982 (broadcast); November 18, 2023 (streaming); Label: HBO/Columbia/Legacy/Sony/The Johnny Cash Archive	
1987	Live from Austin, TX: Released: January 3, 1987 (for Austin City Limits broadcast); November 1, 2005 (DVD); 2007 (DVD); February 14, 2012 (CD+DVD); 2017 (streaming); 2021 (LP+DVD); Label: New West Records	US: Platinum
1990	Highwaymen Live! with Willie Nelson, Waylon Jennings and Kris Kristofferson: Recorded: March 14, 1990; Released: October 9, 1990 (VHS); 1992 (laserdisc); February 1, 2005 (DVD); 2006/2007/2009/2012 (DVD); May 20, 2016 (American Outlaws: Live At Nassau Coliseum expanded edition: 3xCD+Blu-ray/3xCD+DVD/streaming); September 5, 2019 (3xCD+DVD/streaming); Label: CMV Enterprises/SMV Enterprises/Sony BMG/Sony Music/Columbia/Legacy/Qello Concerts	AUS: 10× Platinum; AUS: Gold (expanded ed.)
1991	Cash for Kenya: Live in Johnstown, PA: Recorded: September 17, 1991; Released: 2008 (DVD); Label: Mercury Records	
1992	Return to the Promised Land: Released: 1992 (VHS); November 21, 2000 (audio only CD); July 13, 2018 (CD+DVD); Label: World Wide Pictures/World Wide Video/Renaissance Recordings/Grey Scale	
1993	In Ireland: Recorded: February 11, 1993; Released: October 13, 2006 (DVD); Label: Mercury Records/UMe	
1993	The Highwaymen: On the Road Again with Willie Nelson, Waylon Jennings and Kris Kristofferson: Released: September 23, 1993 (VHS); March 9, 1994 (VHS/laserdisc); July 1, 2003 (DVD); 2021 (streaming); Label: White Star	
1994	Live at Montreux 1994: Recorded: 1994 (at Montreux Jazz Festival); Released: March 29, 2005 (DVD/streaming); April 9, 2012 (EU 2xCD+DVD); Label: Eagle Eye Media/Eagle Vision/Montreux Sounds	ARIA: 2× Platinum; US: 2× Platinum
1997	VH1 Storytellers: Johnny Cash & Willie Nelson: Released: May 12, 1997 (broadcast); June 9, 1998 (audio only CD); 2023 (streaming); Label: VH1/American Recordings/Sony Records	
1998	Biography - Johnny Cash: The Man in Black: Released: April 29, 1998 (broadcast); July 26, 2005 (DVD); February 6, 2006 (EU DVD); 2007 (CD+DVD); February 26, 2013 (DVD); 2020 (streaming); Label: A&E Networks/A&E Home Video/Mercury Records/Shout! Factory/Hulu	
2000	The Anthology / Half Mile a Day: Released: 2000/2001/2002/2003 (DVD); Label: Image Entertainment/Umbrella Music/Quantum Leap	
2003	Hurt (A Film by Mark Romanek) (also with American IV: The Man Comes Around CD+DVD edition): Released: 2003 (broadcast/DVD single/CD+DVD); 2004 (download); 2019 (streaming); Label: American Recordings/Lost Highway Records	US: 2× Platinum
2004	The Last Great American: Released: February 26, 2004 (broadcast); 2004 (DVD); Label: BBC	
2005	The Road Goes On Forever: 10th Anniversary Edition (includes Live Forever: In the Studio with The Highwaymen): Released: November 8, 2005 (CD+DVD); Label: Capitol Records Nashville	
2006	The Highwaymen: CMT presents American Revolutions: Released: 2006 (broadcast); September 26, 2006 (DVD); Label: Tremolo Productions/Capitol Records Nashville/CMT	
2007	The Gospel Music of Johnny Cash: A Story of Faith and Redemption: Released: May 6, 2007 (VHS/DVD/streaming); Label: Spring House Music/EMI/Gaither Television Productions/Janson Media	US: Gold
2008	At Folsom Prison: Legacy Edition (a/k/a Johnny Cash at Folsom Prison): Released: July 29, 2008 (2xCD+DVD); October 18, 2008 (theatrical); Label: Columbia/Legacy	
2008	Johnny Cash's America: Released: October 4, 2008 (theatrical); October 28, 2008 (CD+DVD); 2009 (broadcast); 2023 (streaming); Label: Tremolo Productions/A&E IndieFilms/BBC	
2008	Chapter & Verse: Released: October 28, 2008 (CD+DVD); Label: Sony BMG	
2009	Johnny Cash Remixed: Released: January 27, 2009 (CD+DVD); Label: Compadre Records/EarMUSIC	
2009	Christmas with Johnny Cash (Christmas Classics: The Yule Log Edition): Released: 2009 (DVD); March 9, 2010 (DVD); Label: Columbia/Legacy	
2012	The Number Ones: Deluxe Edition (previously unreleased performances from The Johnny Cash Show): Released: June 9, 2012 (CD+DVD); Label: Columbia/Legacy/Sony Music	
2012	My Father and the Man in Black: Released: June 15, 2012 (theatrical); October 1, 2013 (DVD/streaming); October 29, 2013 (EU DVD/streaming); 2015/2017 (DVD); Label: New Chapter Productions/Passion River Films/Ballpark Film Distribution/The Orchard/Qello Concerts	
2012	We Walk the Line: A Celebration of the Music of Johnny Cash: Released: August 7, 2012 (streaming/CD+DVD/Blu-ray); August 10, 2012 (broadcast); Label: Blackbird Presents/Columbia/Legacy/Sony Music/PBS	
2012	Song By Song (episode: Johnny Cash: Ring of Fire): Released: October 7, 2012 (broadcast/streaming); 2012 (DVD); Label: TH Entertainment/Ovation/Simply Media/Delta	
2014	The Winding Stream The Carters, the Cashes and the Course of Country Music: Released: March 15, 2014 (theatrical); April 1, 2014 (broadcast/streaming); May 17, 2016 (DVD); Label: Beth Harrington Productions/Argot Pictures/Apple TV/Virgil Films and Entertainment	
2014	American Rebel (a/k/a I Am Johnny Cash): Released: December 30, 2014 (theatrical); September 12, 2015 (broadcast/streaming); December 9, 2016 (EU DVD); September 24, 2021 (EU DVD/Blu-ray); Label: Network Entertainment/CMT/Apple TV/The CW/WVG Medien	
2015	We're Still Here: Johnny Cash's Bitter Tears Revisited: Released: November 2015 (theatrical); February 1, 2016 (broadcast); August 21, 2018 (DVD); October 19, 2022 (streaming); Label: Gigantic Pictures/PBS/Kino Lorber	
2016	American Masters - The Highwaymen: Friends Till the End: Released: May 27, 2016 (broadcast/streaming); Label: PBS	
2019	The Gift: The Journey of Johnny Cash: Released: October 11, 2019 (theatrical); November 11, 2019 (streaming); Label: Old Farm Road Films/Sutter Road Picture Company/YouTube	
2020	Johnny Cash & Me: Released: April 18, 2020 (broadcast/streaming); 2020 (DVD); Label: Media & Policy Center Foundation/NETA/PBS/Kanopy	
2020	My Darling Vivian: Released: April 27, 2020 (theatrical); June 19, 2020 (broadcast); December 8, 2020 (DVD/streaming); Label: Giant Pictures/The Film Collaborative	
2020	The Man in Black in Britain: Released: November 22, 2020 (broadcast/streaming); Label: Lonesome Pine Productions/Channel 5/Sky Arts	
2021	Road To Redemption: Released: April 10, 2021 (broadcast/streaming); Label: AMS Pictures/Reelz	
2021	The Man in Black: Released: 2021 (broadcast); January 19, 2022 (streaming); Label: Reelz	
2022	The Redemption of an American Icon: Released: December 5, 2022 (theatrical/streaming); Label: Radiate Films/Fathom Events/Starz/Lionsgate Studios	

== Tribute albums ==
Title	Details	Peak chart positions	
Title	Details	US Country	US
Goodnight Bill Walker	Released: November 30, 1970; Label: Columbia	—	—
The Sound Behind Johnny Cash	Released: March 24, 1971; Label: Columbia	—	—
Til Things Are Brighter: A Tribute to Johnny Cash	Release date: 1988; Label: Rhino Entertainment	—	—
Cash On Delivery: An Alternative Country Tribute to Johnny Cash	Release date: 1999; Label: CMH Records	—	—
Americana: A Tribute to Johnny Cash	Release date: 2000; Label: Irregular Records	—	—
Cash from Chaos: A Tribute to the Legendary Man in Black	Release date: 2001; Label: Invisible Records	—	—
Cash Only: A Tribute to Johnny Cash	Release date: 2002; Label: Bluelight Records	—	—
Dressed in Black: A Tribute to Johnny Cash	Release date: 2002; Label: Dualtone Records	53	—
Kindred Spirits: A Tribute to the Songs of Johnny Cash	Release date: 2002; Label: Columbia Records	17	140
Johnny's Blues: A Tribute to Johnny Cash	Release date: 2003; Label: NorthernBlues Music	—	—
Dear Johnny...A Tribute to Cash	Release date: 2004; Label: Wolverine Records	—	—
To Hell with Johnny Cash	Release date: 2005; Label: Deckdisc	—	—
Johnny Cash: Roots and Branches	Release date: 2006; Label: Hip-O Records	—	—
Fade to Black: Memories of Johnny	Release date: 2008; Label: In-Light	—	—
All Aboard: A Tribute to Johnny Cash	Release date: 2008; Label: Anchorless Records	—	—
Johnny Cash Remixed	Release date: 2009; Label: Compadre Records	65	—
We Walk The Line: A Celebration of the Music of Johnny Cash	Release date: 2012; Label: Columbia Records/Legacy	38	200
The Johnny Cash Music Festival 2011	Release date: 2012; Label: Coming Home Music	—	—
Look Again to the Wind - Johnny Cash's Bitter Tears Revisited	Release date: 2014; Label: Sony Masterworks	—	—
Forever Words	Release date: 2018; Label: Legacy	9	66
"—" denotes releases that did not chart
