= The Man in Black – His Greatest Hits =

The Man In Black-His Greatest Hits

Compilation album by Johnny Cash
- Released: 1999
- Recorded: 1955–1985
- Genre: Country; rock and roll; gospel
- Label: Columbia

Johnny Cash chronology
| VH1 Storytellers: Johnny Cash & Willie Nelson (1998) | The Man In Black-His Greatest Hits (1999) | 16 Biggest Hits (1999) |

Professional ratings
Review scores
| Source | Rating |
|---|---|
| AllMusic | 5/5 stars |

The Man In Black-His Greatest Hits is a compilation album released on Columbia Records in 1999. It is a two disc set including 30 songs (15 on each disc). Even though it was released on the Columbia label, it does contain some of his Sun recordings, which were allowed to fall into the Public Domain, as well as his Columbia recordings. Two tracks, "What is Truth" and a duet with Bob Dylan, "Girl from the North Country", appeared on an American Johnny Cash album for the first time.

== Track listing ==
Disc One
| No. | Title | Writer(s) | Length |
|---|---|---|---|
| 1. | "Folsom Prison Blues" (live) | Johnny Cash | 2:44 |
| 2. | "I Walk the Line" | Johnny Cash | 2:44 |
| 3. | "Guess Things Happen That Way" | Jack Clement | 1:49 |
| 4. | "Jackson" (featuring June Carter Cash) | Gaby Rodgers / Billy Edd Wheeler | 2:45 |
| 5. | "Ballad of a Teenage Queen" | Jack Clement | 2:10 |
| 6. | "Flesh and Blood" | Johnny Cash | 2:36 |
| 7. | "Daddy Sang Bass" | Carl Perkins | 2:19 |
| 8. | "A Boy Named Sue" (live) | Shel Silverstein | 3:47 |
| 9. | "Don't Take Your Guns to Town" | Johnny Cash | 3:02 |
| 10. | "Ring of Fire" (featuring The Carter Family) | June Carter Cash / Merle Kilgore | 2:36 |
| 11. | "There Ain't No Good Chain Gang" (featuring Waylon Jennings) | Hal Bynum / Dave Kirby | 3:17 |
| 12. | "Big River" | Johnny Cash | 2:30 |
| 13. | "The Rebel – Johnny Yuma" | Richard Markowitz | 1:51 |
| 14. | "What Is Truth" | Johnny Cash | 2:37 |
| 15. | "One Piece at a Time" | Wayne Kemp | 4:01 |

Disc two
| No. | Title | Writer(s) | Length |
|---|---|---|---|
| 1. | "Man in Black" | Johnny Cash | 2:52 |
| 2. | "Understand Your Man" | Johnny Cash | 2:42 |
| 3. | "There You Go" | Johnny Cash | 2:17 |
| 4. | "Tennessee Flat Top Box" | Johnny Cash | 2:58 |
| 5. | "Girl from the North Country" (featuring Bob Dylan) | Bob Dylan | 3:42 |
| 6. | "Sunday Mornin' Comin' Down" | Kris Kristofferson | 4:09 |
| 7. | "Five Feet High and Rising" | Johnny Cash | 1:45 |
| 8. | "Orange Blossom Special" (featuring The Carter Family, Charlie McCoy, Boots Randolph) | Ervin T. Rouse | 3:06 |
| 9. | "(Ghost) Riders in the Sky" | Stan Jones | 3:46 |
| 10. | "Highwayman" (featuring Waylon Jennings, Kris Kristofferson, Willie Nelson) | Jimmy Webb | 3:03 |
| 11. | "If I Were a Carpenter" (featuring June Carter Cash) | Tim Hardin | 3:00 |
| 12. | "A Thing Called Love" | Jerry Reed | 2:31 |
| 13. | "The Ballad of Ira Hayes" | Peter La Farge | 4:08 |
| 14. | "I Still Miss Someone" | Johnny Cash / Roy Cash | 2:36 |
| 15. | "Were You There (When They Crucified My Lord)?" (featuring The Carter Family) | Traditional | 3:52 |

== Charts ==
Album - Billboard (United States)

| Chart (1999) | Peak position |
|---|---|
| Top Country Albums | 63 |
