= 16 Biggest Hits (Johnny Cash album) =

Greatest hits album by Johnny Cash
- Released: February 1999
- Recorded: 1956–1979
- Genre: Country; rockabilly
- Length: 54:51
- Label: Sony

Johnny Cash chronology
The Man In Black - His Greatest Hits (1999)	16 Biggest Hits (1999)	Love, God and Murder (2000)

Professional ratings
Review scores
Source	Rating
AllMusic	3/5 stars

16 Biggest Hits is a compilation album by country singer Johnny Cash released in 1999.

The album is made of the biggest hits of Cash's career like "Ring of Fire", "Understand Your Man", and "A Boy Named Sue". The album also contains several songs which were not hits such as "I Still Miss Someone", and "The Legend of John Henry's Hammer".

Cash had 13 US #1 country hits between 1956 and 1976, with this album containing only 8 of them.

The album was certified 2× Platinum in 2005 by the RIAA. It has sold 3,203,000 copies in the US as of May 2013.

== Track listing ==
All tracks are written by Johnny Cash, except where noted.

No.	Title	Writer(s)	Length
1.	"I Walk the Line"		2:43
2.	"I Still Miss Someone"	Cash, Roy Cash	2:36
3.	"The Legend of John Henry's Hammer"	Cash, June Carter Cash	8:26
4.	"Don't Take Your Guns to Town"		3:02
5.	"In the Jailhouse Now"	Jimmie Rodgers	2:22
6.	"Ring of Fire"	June Carter Cash, Merle Kilgore	2:36
7.	"Understand Your Man"		2:43
8.	"The Ballad of Ira Hayes"	Peter La Farge	4:08
9.	"Folsom Prison Blues" (Live)		2:45
10.	"Daddy Sang Bass"	Carl Perkins	2:23
11.	"A Boy Named Sue" (Live)	Shel Silverstein	3:44
12.	"Sunday Morning Coming Down"	Kris Kristofferson	4:09
13.	"Flesh and Blood"		2:37
14.	"Man in Black"		2:51
15.	"One Piece at a Time"	Wayne Kemp	4:02
16.	"(Ghost) Riders in the Sky"	Stan Jones	3:43

== Charts ==
Album - Billboard (United States)

Chart (1999)	Peak position
Top Country Albums	18
Billboard 200	65

=== Year-end charts ===
Chart (2001)	Position
Canadian Country Albums (Nielsen SoundScan)	75

Chart (2002)	Position
Canadian Country Albums (Nielsen SoundScan)	53

== Certifications ==
Region	Certification	Certified units/sales
United States (RIAA)	2× Platinum	2,000,000^{^}
^{^} Shipments figures based on certification alone.
