= Columbia Records 1958–1986 =

Columbia Records 1958-1986

Compilation album by Johnny Cash
- Released: September 1987
- Recorded: August 8, 1958–April 1983
- Genre: Country, rock, folk, blues
- Length: 67 minutes
- Label: Columbia

Johnny Cash chronology
Heroes (1986)	Columbia Records 1958-1986 (1987)	Johnny Cash is Coming to Town (1987)

Professional ratings
Review scores
Source	Rating
AllMusic	5/5 stars

Columbia Records 1958–1986 is a Johnny Cash compilation album released on Columbia Records in 1987 to commemorate the 28 years Cash (who had recently left Columbia for Mercury Records) recorded with the label, featuring 20 tracks dating from 1958 to 1986. This album contains many of Cash's famous hits, including Ring Of Fire and Folsom Prison Blues, as well as some of his less-known recordings, such as Seasons of My Heart and Without Love. The album failed to chart, and none of the selections were released as singles.

== Track listing ==
No.	Title	Writer(s)	Length
1.	"Oh, What a Dream"	Johnny Cash	2:02
2.	"I Still Miss Someone"	Johnny Cash, Roy Cash	2:35
3.	"Pickin' Time"	Johnny Cash	1:57
4.	"Don't Take Your Guns to Town"	Johnny Cash	3:01
5.	"Five Feet High and Rising"	Johnny Cash	1:46
6.	"Seasons of My Heart"	Darrell Edwards, George Jones	2:27
7.	"The Legend of John Henry's Hammer"	Johnny Cash, June Carter Cash	8:25
8.	"Ring of Fire"	June Carter Cash, Merle Kilgore	2:35
9.	"The Ballad of Ira Hayes"	Peter La Farge	4:06
10.	"Orange Blossom Special"	M. Christian, Joe Maphis, Ervin T. Rouse	3:05
11.	"Folsom Prison Blues"	Johnny Cash	2:44
12.	"San Quentin"	Johnny Cash	3:02
13.	"A Boy Named Sue"	Shel Silverstein	3:45
14.	"Sunday Mornin' Comin' Down"	Kris Kristofferson	4:08
15.	"Man in Black"	Johnny Cash	2:48
16.	"One Piece at a Time"	Wayne Kemp	4:00
17.	"(Ghost) Riders in the Sky"	Stan Jones	3:41
18.	"Without Love"	Nick Lowe	2:28
19.	"The Baron"	Paul Richey, Billy Sherrill, Jerry Taylor	3:36
20.	"Highway Patrolman"	Bruce Springsteen	5:18
