= Patriot (Johnny Cash album) =

Compilation album by Johnny Cash
- Released: 1991
- Recorded: 1964–1981
- Genre: Country; folk
- Label: Columbia

Johnny Cash chronology
Country Christmas (1991)	Patriot (1991)	Wanted Man (1994)

Patriot, a 1991 compilation album by the American singer-songwriter Johnny Cash, collects some of Cash's patriotic songs released on Columbia Records. The album contains 10 tracks from Cash's long stint with Columbia, from 1958 to 1987, including two songs not commonly found on other Cash releases: The opening track, "Song of the Patriot", was originally released on the 1981 compilation album Encore, and the ninth track, "Singing in Vietnam Talking Blues", comes from the 1971 vinyl album Man in Black and sees its first release on CD here.

== Track listing ==
No.	Title	Writer(s)	Length
1.	"Song of the Patriot"	Shirl Milete / Marty Robbins	3:28
2.	"Paul Revere" (with dialogue)	Glenn Tubb	2:43
3.	"Gettysburg Address" (with dialogue)	Abraham Lincoln	2:40
4.	"Man in Black"	Johnny Cash	2:51
5.	"From Sea to Shining Sea"	Johnny Cash	1:38
6.	"Mr Garfield"	Ramblin' Jack Elliott	3:59
7.	"Sold Out of Flag Poles"	Johnny Cash	2:46
8.	"The Ballad of Ira Hayes"	Peter La Farge	4:11
9.	"Singing in Vietnam Talking Blues"	Johnny Cash	2:59
10.	"Ragged Old Flag"	Johnny Cash	3:09
