= VH1 Storytellers: Johnny Cash & Willie Nelson =

VH1 Storytellers

Live album by Johnny Cash, Willie Nelson
- Released: June 9, 1998
- Recorded: 1997–1998
- Genre: Country
- Labels: American Recordings; Sony
- Producer: Rick Rubin

Johnny Cash chronology
Unchained (1996)	VH1 Storytellers (1998)	The Man In Black - His Greatest Hits (1999)

Professional ratings
Review scores
Source	Rating
Allmusic	3/5 stars

VH1 Storytellers is a live album by Johnny Cash and Willie Nelson, released in 1998 on American Recordings. The album was produced by Rick Rubin and was the third record released as part of Cash's ten-year period of collaboration with Rubin. It is not, however, counted as part of the American Recordings series, which is reserved for Cash's studio work with Rubin.

Cash and Nelson take turns on songs associated with each respective artist, usually with the other performing harmony or occasionally verses. The opening track is a duet with Cash and Nelson, and some tracks feature guitar solos by Nelson. Between tracks, Cash and Nelson joke with each other and discuss the songs and their origins.

This was the final album of new performances released by Cash prior to the onset of health problems that forced him to curtail live concerts, and which also led to changes in the timbre of his voice noticeable from American III: Solitary Man (his next album release of new recordings issued in 2000) onwards. It was also Cash's final purpose-recorded live album to be released during his lifetime, though an archival recording, Johnny Cash at Madison Square Garden, recorded in 1969, would be issued a year before his death.

== Track listing ==
No.	Title	Writer(s)	Length
1.	"(Ghost) Riders in the Sky"	Stan Jones	6:13
2.	"Worried Man"	Cash, June Carter Cash	3:48
3.	"Family Bible"	Nelson sold the writing credit to Walt Breeland/Paul Buskirk/Claude Gray	3:20
4.	"Don't Take Your Guns to Town"	Cash	4:42
5.	"Funny How Time Slips Away"	Willie Nelson	3:59
6.	"Flesh and Blood"	Cash	2:42
7.	"Crazy"	Nelson	2:23
8.	"Unchained"	Jude Johnstone	2:43
9.	"Night Life"	Breeland/Buskirk/Nelson	3:43
10.	"Drive On"	Cash	2:23
11.	"Me and Paul"	Nelson	3:11
12.	"I Still Miss Someone"	Cash, Roy Cash Jr.	3:13
13.	"Always on My Mind"	Johnny Christopher/Mark James/Wayne Carson Thompson	4:05
14.	"Folsom Prison Blues"	Cash	3:40
15.	"On the Road Again"	Nelson	1:32

Duet on "(Ghost) Riders in the Sky" and "Worried Man"; Nelson lead, duet chorus on "Family Bible" and "On the Road Again"; Cash lead, duet chorus on "Don't Take Your Guns to Town"; Cash sings "Flesh and Blood", "Unchained". "Drive On", "I Still Miss Someone" and "Folsom Prison Blues"; Nelson sings "Funny How Time Slips Away", "Crazy", "Night Life", "Me and Paul" and "Always on My Mind".

== Personnel ==
- Johnny Cash - Vocals, Guitar, Producer
- Willie Nelson - Vocals, Guitar

Additional personnel

- Rick Rubin - Producer, Mixing
- Sean Murphy - Producer
- Bill Flanagan - Executive Producer
- Michael Simon - Director
- Koji Egawa - Assistant Engineer, Mixing Assistant
- Randy Ezratty, Al Schmitt - Mixing
- Paul Cohen - House Mix
- Stephen Marcussen - Mastering
- David Coleman - Art Direction, Artwork, Design
- Wayne Wilkins - Art Direction, Artwork
- Marc Bryan-Brown - Photography
- Bruce Gillmer - Project Supervisor
- Wayne Isaak - Music Executive
- Sean Kelly - Coordination

== Charts ==
Chart performance for VH1 Storytellers: Johnny Cash & Willie Nelson
Chart (1998)	Peak position
US Top Country Albums (Billboard)	25
US Billboard 200	56
