= The Ramrods (instrumental group) =

50's and 60's Era Instrumental Group

- Origin: Connecticut, United States
- Genres: Instrumental rock
- Years active: 1956–late 1960s
- Labels: Amy, London
- Past members: Claire Lane; Rich Litke; Vinny Lee; Gene Morro; Russ Cook; Bernie Moore; George Sheck

The Ramrods were an American instrumental rock band in the late 1950s and 1960s, who had a hit in 1961 with their version of the song "(Ghost) Riders in the Sky".

The group was formed in Stamford, Connecticut, United States in 1956 by Claire Lane (born Claire Litke) and her brother Rich Litke. Claire played drums, sang, and arranged the songs; Rich played saxophone. They added Vinny Lee on lead guitar, and Gene Morro on second guitar. At the end of 1960, they recorded their instrumental arrangement of "(Ghost) Riders in the Sky", a song written by Stan Jones which had been a big hit in 1949 for Vaughn Monroe. The Ramrods' version contained eerie and evocative overdubbed shouts, whistles and cattle calls, and was placed with Amy Records, a subsidiary of Bell Records in New York City. The record was made a "Pick of the Week" by Cash Box magazine, and rose to number 30 on the Billboard pop chart in early 1961. Released on the London label, it also reached number 8 on the UK Singles Chart.

The follow-up, "Loch Lomond Rock", a rocked-up version of a traditional Scottish tune, with bagpipes solo, was not successful, and nor were two later singles on the Amy label.

Gene Morro left the group in the early 1960s, and was replaced by Russ Cook (born Russ Mumma) on bass. Vinny Lee later died and was replaced by Bernie Moore (no relation to Gene Moore), who was in turn later replaced by George Sheck, with Cook taking over on lead guitar. Claire Lane left the group in the late 1960s to pursue a solo career, and the remaining Ramrods became the Russ Cook Combo before disbanding in the early 1970s.

== Discography ==
=== Singles ===
Year	Title	Peak chart positions			Record Label	B-side
Year	Title	US Pop	US R&B	UK	Record Label	B-side
1960	"(Ghost) Riders in the Sky"	30	—	8	Amy	"Zig Zag"
1961	"Loch Lomond Rock"	—	—	—	Amy	"Take Me Back to My Boots and Saddle"
1962	"War Cry"	—	—	—	Amy	"Boing!"
