= Live from Austin, TX (Johnny Cash album) =

Live album by Johnny Cash
- Released: 1 November 2005
- Recorded: 3 January 1987
- Label: New West

Recorded on January 3, 1987, Live from Austin, TX is Johnny Cash's performance from the Austin, Texas television show, Austin City Limits. It was released on New West Records in 2005. Cash performs many old hits, and performs new ones from his latest releases on Mercury Records, where he just recently moved to. The CD and DVD do not contain the whole show — the songs "The Big Light", "A Wonderful Time Up There", and "The Fourth Man in the Fire" were left out.

== Track list ==
No.	Title	Writer(s)	Length
1.	"Ring of Fire"	June Carter Cash, Merle Kilgore	3:00
2.	"Folsom Prison Blues"	Johnny Cash	2:45
3.	"Sunday Mornin' Comin' Down"	Kris Kristofferson	4:31
4.	"I Walk the Line"	Johnny Cash	2:55
5.	"The Wall"	Harlan Howard	1:38
6.	"Long Black Veil"	Marijohn Wilkin	2:46
7.	"Big River"	Johnny Cash	2:39
8.	"I'll Go Somewhere and Sing My Songs Again"	Tom T. Hall	3:12
9.	"Let Him Roll"	Guy Clark	5:16
10.	"Ballad of Barbara"	Johnny Cash	3:45
11.	"Sam Stone"	John Prine	4:08
12.	"(Ghost) Riders in the Sky"	Stan Jones	3:43
13.	"Where Did We Go Right" (with June Carter Cash)	Donal Schlitz, David Loggins	3:08
14.	"I Walk the Line" (outro)	Johnny Cash	3:01
Total length:			46:27

== Personnel ==
- Johnny Cash - vocals, acoustic guitar
- June Carter Cash - vocals
- Anita Carter - vocals
- Earl Poole Ball - piano
- W.S. Holland - drums
- Jim Soldi - electric guitar
- Joe Allen - bass
- Bob Wootton - electric guitar
- Jack Hale Jr. - trumpet, harmonica
- Bob Lewin - trumpet, keyboards

== Additional personnel ==
- Executive Producer: Cameron Strang
- Producers: Cameron Strang, Jay Woods & Gary Briggs
- Recorded By: David Hough, Sharon Cullen
- Mixed By: Chet Himes @ Asm Studios
- Audio Mastering: Jerry Tubb @ Terra Nova Digital Audio
- Design: Katherine Delaney
- Photography: Scott Newton
- Project Coordinators: Mary Jurey & Clare Surgeson
- Liner Notes: Terry Lickona
