= Have a Little Talk with Myself =

Studio album by Ray Stevens
- Released: 1969
- Studio: Monument Recording, Nashville, Tennessee
- Genre: Pop
- Label: Monument
- Producer: Ray Stevens, Jim Malloy

Ray Stevens chronology
Gitarzan (1969)	Have a Little Talk with Myself (1969)	Everything Is Beautiful (1970)

Singles from Have a Little Talk with Myself
- 1. "Sunday Mornin' Comin' Down" Released: September 1969; 2. "Have a Little Talk with Myself" Released: November 1969; 3. "I'll Be Your Baby Tonight" Released: February 1970

Have a Little Talk with Myself is the fifth studio album by Ray Stevens and his third and final for Monument Records, released in 1969. Stevens left Monument in early 1970 and signed with Andy Williams' Barnaby Records label. This album is quite different from Stevens's previous albums, for he concentrates on interpreting the works of other writers, and only contributes two of his own compositions. The cover versions include Bob Dylan's "I'll Be Your Baby Tonight", the First Edition's hit "But You Know I Love You", two songs from the musical Hair, three songs of the Beatles, Blood, Sweat & Tears' hit "Spinning Wheel", and Joe South's hit "Games People Play".

The back of the album cover contains an essay by John Grissim of Rolling Stone, which describes how Stevens handles his recording sessions, then praises his craft in music, and finally describes Stevens' interpretations of the cover songs on the album. On the back of the album, there is also a technical note from the album's co-producer, Jim Malloy: "In addition to doing all the arrangements on this album, Ray Stevens...sings ALL the voices...plays the piano, organ, bells and any other special effect instruments...and plays the trumpet solo on 'SPINNING WHEEL.'" Two pictures are featured on the album's back cover as well - one with Stevens and Malloy laughing in the studio and another of Stevens playing the piano and singing into a microphone on the floor of the studio.

Stevens's version of "Sunday Mornin' Comin' Down" was the very first recording of the song. Although its composer Kris Kristofferson recorded it for his 1970 album Kristofferson, he never released his own version as a single. The song became a bigger hit for Johnny Cash one year after Stevens's release of the song.

Aside from "Sunday Mornin' Comin' Down" (which came out a few months before the album), two singles were taken from the album: the title track and "I'll Be Your Baby Tonight".

David Wagner of the Green Bay Press-Gazette called the album "one of the biggest disappointments of the past few months" because of its turn away from comedic music and instead having Stevens act as a "mediocre pop singer".

== Track listing ==
Side one
No.	Title	Writer(s)	Length
1.	"I'll Be Your Baby Tonight"	Bob Dylan	3:40
2.	"But You Know I Love You"	Mike Settle	3:10
3.	"Aquarius"	James Rado, Gerome Ragni, Galt MacDermot	2:46
4.	"The Fool on the Hill"	John Lennon, Paul McCartney	3:18
5.	"Sunday Mornin' Comin' Down"	Kris Kristofferson	4:26
6.	"Spinning Wheel"	D.C. Thomas	2:49

Side two
No.	Title	Writer(s)	Length
1.	"Games People Play"	Joe South	3:32
2.	"Help"	Lennon, McCartney	3:32
3.	"Hair"	James Rado, Gerome Ragni, Galt MacDermot	3:06
4.	"Hey Jude"	Lennon, McCartney	4:42
5.	"The Little Woman"	Ray Stevens	3:21
6.	"Have a Little Talk with Myself"	Stevens	2:58

== Personnel ==
Musicians

- Ray Stevens – lead and backing vocals, piano, organ, bells, effects, arrangements, trumpet on “Spinning Wheel”
- Jerry Kennedy – guitar
- Norbert Putnam – bass
- Jerry Carrigan – drums
- Farrell Morris – percussion
- Violin: Brenton Banks
- Violin: Lillian Hunt
- Violin: Sheldon Kurland
- Violin: George Binkley
- Violin: Martin Katahn
- Violin: Solie Fott
- Viola: Marvin Chantry
- Viola: Gary Vanosdale
- Viola: Howard Carpenter
- Viola: Bobby Becker
- Cello: Byron Bach
- Trumpet: Don Sheffield
- Trumpet: George Tidwell
- Trumpet: Glenn Baxter
- Trombone: Dennis Good
- Trombone: Gene Mullins
- Sax: Norm Ray
- Sax: Johnny Duke
- Producers: Ray Stevens, Jim Malloy
- Engineers: Jim Malloy, Tommy Strong
- Recorded in the Monument Recording Studio
- Cover photo: Keats Tyler
- Art direction: Ken Kim

== Charts ==
Singles

Year	Single	Chart	Position
1969	"Sunday Mornin' Comin' Down"	Billboard Hot 100	81
1969	"Sunday Mornin' Comin' Down"	Hot Country Singles	55
1969	"Sunday Mornin' Comin' Down"	Canadian RPM Top Singles	59
1969	"Sunday Mornin' Comin' Down"	Canadian RPM Country Tracks	46
1970	"Have a Little Talk With Myself"	Bubbling Under Hot 100 Singles	123
1970	"Have a Little Talk With Myself"	Hot Country Singles	63
1970	"I'll Be Your Baby Tonight"	Bubbling Under Hot 100 Singles	112
