= Bull Rider (song) =

Song by Johnny Cash

Single by Johnny Cash

from the album Silver
- A-side: "Bull Rider" "Lonesome to the Bone"
- Released: March 1, 1980
- Genre: Country
- Label: Columbia 1-11237
- Songwriter(s): Rodney Crowell
- Producer(s): Brian Ahern

Johnny Cash singles chronology
"Wings in the Morning" (1980)	"Bull Rider" (1980)	"Song of the Patriot" (1980)

Audio
- "Bull Rider" on YouTube

"Bull Rider" is a song written by Rodney Crowell and originally recorded by Johnny Cash for his 25th anniversary album Silver (1979).

Released as a single in 1980 (Columbia 1-11237, with "Lonesome to the Bone" from the same album on the opposite side), the song reached number 66 on U.S. Billboard's country chart.

== Track listing ==
7" single (Columbia 1-11237, 1980)
No.	Title	Writer(s)	Length
1.	"Bull Rider"	R. Crowell	3:07
2.	"Lonesome to the Bone"	J. R. Cash	2:36

== Charts ==
Chart (1980)	Peak position
US Hot Country Songs (Billboard)	66
