= Saul Holiff =

Canadian music promoter and manager

- Born: June 22, 1925; London, Ontario
- Died: March 17, 2005 (aged 79); Nanaimo, British Columbia
- Education: London Central Collegiate Institute
- Occupation: music manager
- Years active: 1950s – 1973
- Spouse: Barbara Jean Robinson (m.1964)
- Children: Jonathan, Joshua
- Awards: Gold Leaf Award – 'Canadian Industry Music Industry Man of the Year'

Saul Holiff (June 22, 1925 – March 17, 2005) was a Canadian music promoter and Johnny Cash's manager for thirteen years.

Saul Holiff was born in London, Ontario, on June 22, 1925. He dropped out of high school, the London Central Collegiate Institute, when he was fifteen, and worked a variety of jobs: delivered newspapers, ran a fruit and vegetable business, drove trucks, worked as a puddler at the Steel Company of Canada, a traveling salesman, and a self-employed clothing merchant. During World War II he trained as a rear air gunner in the Royal Canadian Air Force.

In the 1950s he performed at London's Grand Theatre in a variety of roles before becoming a concert promoter and manager with offices in London, Los Angeles and Nashville. He promoted such acts as Bill Haley and the Comets, Paul Anka and Johnny Cash through smaller venues such as his own restaurant, Sol's Square Boy.

Holiff managed Johnny Cash’s career from 1960 to 1973. He also managed Tommy Hunter, Debbie Lori Kaye and The Statler Brothers. In 1961 Holiff was responsible for introducing singer June Carter into Cash's act.

In 1970 Holiff won a Gold Leaf Award for 'Canadian Industry Music Industry Man of the Year'. These awards were the precursor to the Juno Awards.

Cash and Holiff had a tumultuous relationship, which is highlighted in the 2012 film My Father and the Man in Black, an award-winning documentary created by Holiff's son Jonathan.

Holiff negotiated a $75,000 settlement agreement with Gordon Jenkins because of the similarity of Cash's hit "Folsom Prison Blues" to a Jenkins song.

After Holiff quit as Cash's manager in 1973, he retired from show business. He enrolled at the University of Victoria, and earned a bachelor's degree in history.

Holiff died by suicide on March 17, 2005, in Nanaimo, British Columbia.

== Honours and legacy ==
In 2018 he was awarded a posthumous lifetime achievement award at the Forrest City London Music Awards.

The Holiff family archives, which include materials related to Holiff's management of Johnny Cash and the documentary My Father and the Man in Black, are held at the University of Victoria Libraries Special Collections and University Archives.
