= I Walk the Line (film) =

1970 film by John Frankenheimer

- Film poster
- Directed by: John Frankenheimer
- Screenplay by: Alvin Sargent
- Based on: An Exile by Madison Jones
- Produced by: Harold D. Cohen; Edward Lewis
- Starring: Gregory Peck; Tuesday Weld
- Cinematography: David M. Walsh
- Edited by: Henry Berman
- Music by: Johnny Cash
- Distributed by: Columbia Pictures
- Release dates: October 12, 1970 (Premiere); November 18, 1970 (US)
- Running time: 95 minutes
- Country: United States
- Language: English

I Walk the Line is a 1970 American neo noir drama film directed by John Frankenheimer and starring Gregory Peck and Tuesday Weld. It tells the story of Sheriff Henry Tawes (Peck) who develops a relationship with a girl in town, Alma McCain (Weld). The screenplay, written by Alvin Sargent, is an adaptation of Madison Jones' novel An Exile. The I Walk the Line soundtrack is by Johnny Cash; it features his 1956 hit song of the same name.

== Plot ==
Henry Tawes is an aging sheriff in the small town of Gainesboro, Tennessee, who is becoming bored with his wife, Ellen, and his life. He encounters the comely Alma McCain, who is far younger than Henry and the oldest daughter of a moonshining family new in the county.

Alma makes herself available to Henry, a seduction supported by her father and brother as protection for their illegal whiskey business. When Tawes discovers the McCain still, after learning that a Federal "revenuer" named Bascomb is in town sniffing around, he demands that they destroy it immediately.

A deputy, Hunnicutt, starts taking an interest in the McCains. Henry's wife also suspects that he is having an affair and confronts him. Bascomb organizes a search of the county, with the McCains of particular interest; Henry also learns from him that Alma is married, her husband being in prison; he becomes angry that she hadn't told him, but then they make love and he proposes that they run away together. She is reluctant, fearing the response of her family, but they arrange to leave for California the next day.

In the meantime, Hunicutt visits the McCain family, looking for an illegal still, where he meets Alma. After implying that he knows what's going on with her and Sheriff Tawes, and coming on to her, the deputy draws his weapon and shoots dead the family dog in front of her and proceeds to move on her. Her father and brothers are coming home and witness this from a distance. In the original theatrical release and the version shown on free over-the-air network broadcast television for decades, her father shoots the deputy with his rifle from a distance on a hill, to protect his daughter from attack. That scene is removed from the video release version.

The film cuts forward to scenes of Tawes being informed that his deputy is missing and the McCain family frantically packing up their still. Tawes visits the McCains to find them disposing of Hunicutt's body. He tells them to "clear out" and disposes of the deputy's body by dropping it into a reservoir. As he returns from disposing of the body, he is met by Bascomb, who has found the remains of the McCain still. Henry starts searching for Alma and pursues the McCain family, finding her with them; he fights with her father and brother, shooting her father, but Alma attacks him with a farmer's hook. Neither injury is fatal. Leaving him on the road, alive but badly injured, the McCains drive off.

== Cast ==
- Gregory Peck as Sheriff Henry Tawes
- Tuesday Weld as Alma McCain
- Estelle Parsons as Ellen
- Ralph Meeker as Carl McCain
- Lonny Chapman as Bascomb
- Charles Durning as Hunnicutt
- Jeff Dalton as Clay McCain
- Freddie McCloud as Buddy McCain
- Jane Rose as Elsie
- J.C. Evans as Grandpa Tawes
- Margaret A. Morris as Sybil
- Bill Littleton as Pollard
- Leo Yates as Vogel
- Nora Denney as Darlene Hunnicutt (as Dodo Denney)

== Production ==
Frankenheimer wanted Gene Hackman to play the sheriff, but Columbia Pictures insisted that Peck be cast in the lead since he was under contract to them. Frankenheimer cast J.C. Evans, his wife's grandfather, who was eighty-two years old, to play the sheriff's father; the director called Evans "quite wonderful" but eventually had Will Geer dub his part. During the drive-in scene, the film playing is The Big Mouth, but the posters at the theater list it as Hook, Line & Sinker (both were Jerry Lewis movies).

The movie was filmed on location in Gainesboro, Tennessee and Center Hill Lake and Dam; also in Colusa County, California by the Sacramento River and in Williams, California at Zumwalt Rd.

== Release ==
The film had its world premiere at the Tennessee Theatre in Nashville on October 12, 1970.

== Reception ==
In a December 1970 review, Time magazine summarized the film's main characters:

- "Tuesday Weld is an understandably desirable love object, a genuine Lolita, but she can make little sense of her rather muddy character"
- "Ralph Meeker, as the ruthless moonshiner, is all sinister smiles and barely repressed violence"
- "(Gregory) Peck succeeds in conveying the sheriff's vulnerability but never his passion"

According to TV Guide, "[t]he one reason to watch is the astonishing, unsung Weld, the modern Louise Brooks, who can suggest amorality, skewed innocence and ageless sensuality—she played nymphets through her thirties with infinite ease—that makes Bardot pale."

In an interview published in October 2009, Madison Jones, the author upon whose novel the film's screenplay was based, said Peck "didn’t really fit the role.... He didn’t really fit any role unless he is playing himself." According to Jones, "Peck himself said there was a good movie lying on the cutting-room floor."

== Soundtrack album ==
Cash re-recorded the title song for the film, and ended up with enough material for a soundtrack album. One of the songs, "Flesh and Blood," even became a number one country hit in 1971. The soundtrack featured three songs not heard in the film ("This Town", "Face of Despair" and "The World's gonna Fall On You").

== See also ==
- List of American films of 1970
