= Silver (Johnny Cash album) =

Studio album by Johnny Cash
- Released: August 13, 1979
- Recorded: February 14 – May 23, 1979
- Genre: Country; outlaw country
- Length: 32:05
- Label: Columbia
- Producer: Brian Ahern

Johnny Cash chronology
Tall Man (1979)	Silver (1979)	A Believer Sings the Truth (1979)

Singles from Silver
- 1. "(Ghost) Riders in the Sky" Released: April 1979; 2. "Cocaine Blues" / "I'll Say It's True" Released: September 1979; 3. "Bull Rider" Released: March 1980

Silver is the 25th anniversary studio album by American country singer Johnny Cash, released on Columbia Records in 1979. It peaked at #28 on the Billboard Country Albums chart. "(Ghost) Riders in the Sky" peaked at #2 on the singles chart; the two other singles, "Bull Rider" and "I'll Say It's True" (with George Jones on background vocals), had reached #66 and #42, respectively. Recordings of "Cocaine Blues" had previously appeared on At Folsom Prison and Now, There Was a Song!, under the title "Transfusion Blues" on the latter. The album was produced by Brian Ahern, who controversially introduced digital elements into the songs to the disapproval of some listeners. This is the last album that featured bassist Marshall Grant, longtime Cash collaborator in Tennessee Two. He departed from Cash's band the following year.

Silver was re-released in 2002 through Legacy Recordings, with remakes of two early Cash songs, "I Still Miss Someone" and "I Got Stripes," as bonus tracks; both are duets with George Jones.

== Critical reception ==
Professional ratings
Review scores
Source	Rating
AllMusic	1.5/5 stars
Music Week	3/4 stars
The Rolling Stone Album Guide	3/5 stars

Rolling Stone wrote: "Silver boasts the strongest song selection of any Cash disc in probably a decade. Born-againers will be disappointed to learn that there are absolutely no born-again tunes. Instead, the singer seems to add extra relish to his rerecording of 'Cocaine Blues'."

== Track listing ==
No.	Title	Writer(s)	Length
1.	"The L&N Don't Stop Here Anymore"	Jean Ritchie	3:17
2.	"Lonesome to the Bone"	Cash	2:40
3.	"Bull Rider"	Rodney Crowell	3:12
4.	"I'll Say It's True" (with George Jones)	Cash	2:48
5.	"(Ghost) Riders in the Sky"	Stan Jones	3:49
6.	"Cocaine Blues"	T. J. "Red" Arnall	3:21
7.	"Muddy Waters"	Phil Rosenthal	3:29
8.	"West Canterbury Subdivision Blues"	Jack Clement	3:48
9.	"Lately I Been Leanin' Toward the Blues"	Billy Joe Shaver	2:37
10.	"I'm Gonna Sit on the Porch and Pick on My Old Guitar"	Cash	3:04

Bonus tracks on 2002 re-issue
No.	Title	Writer(s)	Length
11.	"I Still Miss Someone" (with George Jones)	J. Cash, Roy Cash	2:52
12.	"I Got Stripes" (with George Jones)	Cash, Charlie Williams	2:16

== Personnel ==
- Johnny Cash - vocals, acoustic guitar
- Marshall Grant - bass
- W.S. Holland - drums
- Bob Wootton - electric guitar
- Jack Routh, Jerry Hensley - electric guitar, acoustic guitar
- Jack Clement - acoustic guitar
- Brian Ahern - acoustic guitar, Earthwood bass, 6-string bass, percussion
- Earl Ball, Charles Cochran - piano
- Jack Hale, Bob Lewin - trumpet
- Ricky Skaggs - fiddle
- Bob Johnson - mandocello
- Mark Morris - percussion
- Alisa Jones - Hammer dulcimer
- George Jones – backing vocals on “I’ll Say It’s True”, lead vocals on 2002 bonus tracks “I Still Miss Someone” and “I Got Stripes”
- Jack Wesley Routh, June Carter Cash, Helen Carter, Anita Carter, Jan Howard - backing vocals

=== Production ===
- Original recording produced by: Brian Ahern
- Recorded at Jack Clement Recording Studio and Enactroc Studios
- Engineers: Billy Sherrill & Harold Lee, Brian Ahern and Donivan Cowart
- Produced for reissue by: Al Quaglieri
- Mastered by: Seth Roster at Sony Music Studios, New York
- Tracks 11 and 12 Mixed by: Chris Theis at Sony Music Studios, New York
- Legacy A&R: Steve Berkowitz
- Project Designer: John Jackson
- A&R Coordinator: Darren Salmieri
- Art Direction: Howard Fritzson
- Design: Randall Martin
- Photography: Urve Kuusik/Sony Music Archives, spine sheet: Norman Seeff (from original LP)
- Packaging Manager: John Christiana

== Charts ==
Album - Billboard (United States)

Year	Chart	Position
1979	Country Albums	28

Singles - Billboard (United States)

Year	Single	Chart	Position
1979	"(Ghost) Riders in the Sky"	Country Singles	2
1979	"I'll Say It's True"	Country Singles	42
1980	"Bull Rider"	Country Singles	66
