= Kristofferson (album) =

Album by Kris Kristofferson

Studio album by Kris Kristofferson
- Released: June 1970
- Studio: Monument Recording, Nashville, Tennessee
- Genre: Outlaw country
- Length: 41:29
- Label: Monument
- Producer: Fred Foster

Kris Kristofferson chronology
Kristofferson (1970)	The Silver Tongued Devil and I (1971)

Me and Bobby McGee
- 1971 re-release cover

Kristofferson is the debut album by the singer-songwriter Kris Kristofferson. It was produced by Fred Foster and released in June 1970 by Monument Records. After working a series of temporary jobs, Kristofferson became a helicopter pilot for oil companies in the Gulf of Mexico. While he worked, he wrote songs and pitched them to singers around Music Row in Nashville, Tennessee during his free time. Kristofferson's songs were recorded by country singers Roy Drusky, Jerry Lee Lewis and Roger Miller and later he persuaded Johnny Cash to try his material. Cash invited Kristofferson to perform with him at the Newport Folk Festival, after which Fred Foster signed Kristofferson to Monument Records as a songwriter and recording artist.

Foster included on the sessions Kristofferson's material that other artists had already recorded including "Sunday Mornin' Comin' Down", "Help Me Make It Through the Night" and "Me and Bobby McGee", as well as his new compositions. The arrangements of the songs featured string orchestration, while the themes of the writings included loneliness, love, sexual relations and freedom.

Critics gave Kristofferson a positive reception but the album's original release was a commercial failure. In 1971, following the success of Janis Joplin's recording of "Me and Bobby McGee", the album was reissued as Me and Bobby McGee; it peaked at number 10 on Billboard's Top Country Albums chart and at 43 on Billboard's Top LPs and the release was certified gold. The album garnered mixed ratings in retrospective reviews, as some critics expressed their negative reception of Kristofferson's singing.

== Background ==
In 1965, Kristofferson left his teaching position at the United States Military Academy, and moved to Nashville to start work in the music business as a songwriter. He contacted Marijohn Wilkin, the aunt of his former platoon commander, who signed Kristofferson to her publishing house Buckhorn Music. Wilkin pitched Kristofferson's song "Talkin' Vietnam Blues" to singer Dave Dudley. Concurrently, Kristofferson worked a series of odd jobs that included bartender, construction worker, and railroad worker. He then worked as a janitor for Columbia Records, a job that afforded him the possibility of talking directly with the artists and a presence during recording sessions.

After his second child was born with esophagus issues, Kristofferson took a job with Petroleum Helicopters International in Lafayette, Louisiana. He would fly workers to and from oil rigs in the Gulf of Mexico, and he used the time during flights to compose new songs. At weekends, he returned to Nashville, and for the following week he would pitch the songs around town before returning to Louisiana. The trips exhausted Kristofferson; his children were living with their mother in California and he felt his career as a songwriter was failing. Petroleum Helicopters International reprimanded him for his increased alcohol consumption. Upon returning to Nashville the same week, Kristofferson learned three of his songs had been recorded: "Jody and the Kid" by Roy Drusky, "Help Me Make It Through the Night" by Jerry Lee Lewis and "Me and Bobby McGee" by Roger Miller.

Through June Carter, Kristofferson first attempted to pitch material to her husband Johnny Cash. Carter took the demos, which were eventually lost in a pile of other material Cash had received. At the time, Kristofferson worked on the weekends for the Tennessee National Guard. To attract Cash's attention, Kristofferson landed a helicopter in Cash's property. Cash eventually invited Kristofferson to a "guitar pull" party in his house. Cash was impressed and invited Kristofferson to perform with him at the 1969 Newport Folk Festival. Unsatisfied by Buckhorn Music, Kristofferson decided to change labels. The director of Monument Records, Bob Beckham, invited Kristofferson to play songs for him and label owner Fred Foster. Kristofferson performed "To Beat the Devil", "Jody and the Kid", "The Best of All Possible Worlds" and "Duvalier's Dream"; Foster was impressed and offered Kristofferson two contracts; one as a recording artist for Monument Records and one as a songwriter for Combine Music. The ten-year contract required Kristofferson to submit ten records containing songs he had written. Kristofferson was surprised he had been signed as a singer; he told Foster at the time: "I can't sing, I sound like a frog!" Kristofferson later said Buckhorn Music had not allowed him to record demos of his compositions.

== Recording and content ==
In 1969, Kristofferson left Nashville to join the production of Dennis Hopper's The Last Movie in Peru. In his absence, Cash continued to promote Kristofferson's original songs with other singers. Upon his return to Nashville, Kristofferson learned of his new popularity and started to work on his debut album. As his manager and producer, Foster had decided to keep some of Kristofferson's original material from being passed to other artists. The new material, as well as his songs that had already been recorded by other artists, were included in the recording sessions, which were held at Monument Recording Studio. Kristofferson did not have a backing band so Foster gathered musicians known to him. Johnny Cash wrote the album's liner notes.

=== Compositions ===
The album opens with "Blame It On The Stones", which references the negative perception that the older generations had of The Rolling Stones. The song references the band's 1966 song "Mother's Little Helper". "To Beat the Devil" includes an introduction spoken by Kristofferson, who dedicates the song to Johnny Cash and June Carter. The song depicts a struggling songwriter who meets the Devil at a bar. The character ultimately rejects the Devil's negative message and continues to pursue success in music.

"Me and Bobby McGee"
Opening of "Me and Bobby McGee"

"Me and Bobby McGee" tells the story of a road trip shared by two lovers, who first travel from Baton Rouge to New Orleans, and then until the woman leaves the man in Salinas, California. Foster, who shared an office building with Felice and Boudleaux Bryant, visited the couple to discuss arrangements for a song. Boudleaux Bryant then jokingly accused him of creating an excuse to see his secretary, Barbara "Bobby" McKee. Foster failed to recognize the name, but upon Bryant's insistence about "Bobby McKee" he said; "Oh, yea. Haven't you heard of me and Bobby McKee?" Foster then suggested Kristofferson, who was suffering a writer's block, to attempt a road song about "Me and Bobby McKee". Kristofferson misheard the surname as "McGee". Additionally inspired by Federico Fellini's La Strada, Kristofferson wrote the song while flying helicopters around the Gulf of Mexico. The story's setting was provided by Kristofferson's own trips between New Orleans and Baton Rouge, while the line about windshield wipers occurred to him while driving to the airport on his way back from New Orleans to Nashville. A month after his departure, Kristofferson returned with the finished song that he recorded on a demo accompanied only by Billy Swan on the organ. Foster was also given writing co-credit. "Me and Bobby McGee" was first recorded in 1969 by Roger Miller, whose version peaked at number 12 on Billboard's Hot Country Singles.

"The Best of All Possible Worlds" was inspired by Kristofferson's experience of being arrested. In the song, he observes police officers' mistreatment of black people and the poor, and references Voltaire's novella Candide, in which Voltaire satirized Gottfried Wilhelm Leibniz's claim of the "best of all possible worlds". Kristofferson protested Monument Records' decision to modify the song's lyrics to omit the word "black"; the original lyrics state: "If that's against the law, tell me why I never saw a man locked in that jail of yours that wasn't either black or poor as me". The recorded version changed the line to "low-down poor as me". On the next track "Help Me Make It Through the Night", Kristofferson expresses his need to avoid loneliness by "needing a friend". Kristofferson wrote the song while spending time with Dottie West and her husband Bill. Kristofferson offered the song to West, who initially felt it was "inappropriate" and declined to record it but she later recorded her own version for her album Careless Hands. He took the title from an interview with Frank Sinatra in Esquire, in which Sinatra was asked what he believed in and replied; "booze, broads or a bible ... whatever helps me make it through the night".

"The Law Is for Protection of the People" presents a character who is subjected to unfair treatment by police, a common theme in Kristofferson's writings of the time. In "Casey's Last Ride", Kristofferson tells the story of a lonely man who reminisces about a former lover. The song's arrangements were the most orchestrated on the album and include a melody that in verses shifts from the predominant use of guitar and bass to violins in slower parts. In "Darby's Castle", Kristofferson wrote about Cecil Darby, who neglects his wife in favor of building a large castle for her. Affected by her isolation, Darby sees his wife Helen with another man in her bedroom and then burns the castle in one night.

"Sunday Mornin' Comin' Down"
Previously recorded by Johnny Cash, the song became a number 1 hit

"For the Good Times" describes a sexual encounter between two lovers. The song was first recorded by Ray Price and was released before Kristofferson in June 1970. It reached number one on Billboard's Hot Country Songs chart and crossed over to the Billboard Hot 100, where it peaked at number 12. The next song, "Duvalier's Dream", presents the story of a character who lives in isolation until he meets a woman who re-establishes his connection to society.

The album closes with "Sunday Mornin' Comin' Down", which Kristofferson wrote after his divorce, when he lived alone in a small apartment. He had been fired from his job as a pilot after being found inebriated at work. The song describes a character's struggle with loneliness and isolation. It was first recorded by Ray Stevens in 1969 and in 1970 by Johnny Cash, who also performed it on his television show; Cash's version peaked at number one on Billboard's Hot Country Songs and at number 46 on the Billboard Hot 100.

=== Themes ===
In his biography of Kristofferson, Stephen Miller said the album's songs "focus on deeper aspects of the human condition — inner turmoil and emotional passions, freedom, failure and loss". Biographer Mary Hurd said the characters of "Casey's Last Ride", "Darby's Castle" and "Duvalier's Dream" are "outside society's mainstream". She further commented; "Kristofferson's blending of poetic storytelling with his narrative songs has made them favorites with much of his musical audience. All bearing upon loneliness and isolation."

Author Michael Streissguth wrote; "Produced with session musicians outside A-class circles, it communicated eclecticism and spontaneity: talking blues appeared next to tender ballads next to unhinged jam". Mentioning "Me and Bobby McGee" and "Help Me Make it Through the Night" as examples, Bill C. Malone commented; "His compositions are distinguished by their simple, singable melodies and by their straight-forward but often self-consciously poetic lyrics", and said the album's themes of "freedom" and "the value of honest uninhibited personal relations" brought the "theme of sexuality openly discussed and endorsed without shame" to country music. On its book, The Encyclopedia of Country Music, the staff writers of the Country Music Hall of Fame and Museum said; "the lyrics were tender, intimate, and poetic in a way that made the songs about love rather than sex", and that the compositions' "simple structure" belongs to "the country tradition".

In 2016, Kristofferson told Uncut he felt the album is "quite produced" and said; "I probably wouldn't record it the same way now, but at the time I felt they were making the songs sound better than they were!" Kristofferson said he was "lucky" he was able to record his material at the time and that country music was not "as wide open as it is now".

== Release and reception ==
Kristofferson was released in June 1970. Kristofferson then formed a band with Donnie Fritts (keyboards), Dennis Linde (guitar) and Billy Swan (bass), and embarked on a tour to promote the release. He played at The Troubadour in Los Angeles. On his first night, he opened for Linda Ronstadt and sang "Help Me Make it Through the Night". That year, the album failed commercially, selling 30,000 copies. Following the success of Johnny Cash's version, in November 1970 Kristofferson won Song of the Year at the Country Music Association Awards with "Sunday Mornin' Comin' Down".

Professional ratings
Review scores
Source	Rating
Billboard	Favorable
Los Angeles Times	Favorable
Chicago Daily News	Favorable
Austin American-Statesman	Favorable
The Baltimore Sun	Favorable
Robert Christgau	B−
Rolling Stone	Favorable

Billboard called Kristofferson a "dynamite package", and called its material "potent". Robert Hilburn wrote a favorable critic for the Los Angeles Times, saying; "[Kirstofferson] is able to combine lyric sophistication with country music's traditional interest in everyday problems". The review said the album's themes "deal with hypocrisy", talk about the "need for companionship", the "dangers of a too conventional life", and the time Kristofferson "was arrested for being too poor". For the Chicago Daily News, critic Kathy Orloff described Kristofferson's lyrics as "personal but not mawkish, emotional but not self-indulgent, tender but totally masculine".

The reviewer of the Austin American-Statesman mentioned Kristofferson's fame as a songwriter and other artists recording his material, and said on Kristofferson, his voice is "rough" but that the release was "able to capture the spirit and maintain the honesty of the music his perceptions have produced". While The Baltimore Sun called Kristofferson's voice "lousy", the reviewer noted; "On this album, if you're going to list all the good songs, you'd list all the songs". The Associated Press considered Kristofferson's material "perception and poetry". Critic Robert Christgau gave Kristofferson a B−, commented on the "lack of raw charisma", and called the songs "perfunctory" and the album "disappointing". Rolling Stone called the album "superb" and praised Kristofferson's compositions as "simple songs that speak eloquently of his experiences". The reviewer said Kristofferson's performance is "remarkable strong and expressive".

== Reissues and retrospective reviews ==
In the summer of 1970, Janis Joplin recorded "Me and Bobby McGee" with her newly formed Full Tilt Boogie Band. Her version was released after her death in October 1970; it reached number one on Billboard's Hot 100 and was included on the 1971 release Pearl. In January 1971, the Nashville Songwriters Association named Kristofferson Songwriter of the Year. By June 1971, Kristofferson was reported to be "almost always sold out". Following the momentum of Joplin's success, Monument Records reissued Kristofferson as Me and Bobby McGee in September 1971. The decision was taken after Columbia Records took over the distribution of the Monument Record releases. The reissue of the record improved the original sales figures. The reissued album peaked on Billboard's Top Country Albums at number 10 on November 20, 1971. On the pop charts, it peaked at number 43 on the Billboard's Top LPs by October 9, 1971, and was certified gold.

The album was remastered and unreleased tracks were added to its 2001 edition on Monument-Legacy.

Professional ratings
Review scores
Source	Rating
The Rolling Stone Record Guide	2/5 stars
Robert Christgau	C−
Rolling Stone	4/5 stars
AllMusic	5/5 stars

On the 1979 edition of The Rolling Stone Record Guide, critic Stephen Holden gave the album a negative review. Holden said of Kristofferson: "as a performer, he is a questionable talent", while he added that "his rough singing style—which is minimal, to put it charitably" soon "wears thin". Meanwhile, Holden characterized the material of the songs as "strong". In his Christgau's Record Guide: Rock Albums of the Seventies critic Robert Christgau downgraded Kristofferson from his original review to a C−. Christgau said; "he's the worst singer I've ever heard. It's not that he's off key—he has no relation to key. He also has no phrasing, no dynamics, no energy, no authority, no dramatic ability, and no control of the top two-thirds of his six-note range". Closing the review, he recommended the album for "demo collectors". In a 2001 review, Rolling Stone gave Kristofferson four stars out of five; critic Adam Bresnick described it as "one of the great lost records of the hippie era" and called it "a country masterpiece packed with tales of drifters and dreamers recounted in rough-hewn poetry worthy of the best honky-tonk songwriters". AllMusic gave Kristofferson five stars out of five; the review credited Kristofferson with being different to his contemporary Nashville singer-songwriters because he noted the "natural affinity between the country archetype of a hard-drinking, romantically independent loner and the rock & roll archetype of a drug-taking, romantically free hippie".

== Track listing ==
All tracks written by Kris Kristofferson, except where indicated.

Side One
No.	Title	Writer(s)	Length
1.	"Blame it on the Stones"	Kris Kristofferson, John Buck Wilkin	2:46
2.	"To Beat the Devil"		4:43
3.	"Me and Bobby McGee"	Kristofferson, Fred Foster	4:23
4.	"Best of All Possible Worlds"		3:01
5.	"Help Me Make It Through the Night"		2:24
6.	"The Law Is for Protection of the People"		2:42

Side Two
No.	Title	Length
1.	"Casey's Last Ride"	3:37
2.	"Just the Other Side of Nowhere"	3:39
3.	"Darby's Castle"	3:19
4.	"For the Good Times"	3:25
5.	"Duvalier's Dream"	2:58
6.	"Sunday Mornin' Comin' Down"	4:34

2001 remaster bonus tracks (1–12 as in original album)
No.	Title	Writer(s)	Length
13.	"The Junkie and the Juicehead, Minus Me"		3:24
14.	"Shadows of Her Mind"		3:13
15.	"The Lady's Not for Sale"	Kristofferson, Carol Pugh	3:27
16.	"Come Sundown"		2:36

== Charts ==
Chart performance for Kristofferson
Year	Chart	Peak position
1971	US Top Country Albums (Billboard)	10
1971	US Billboard 200	43

== Personnel ==
Musicians

- Kris Kristofferson – guitar, vocals
- Chip Young, Jerry Kennedy, Jerry Shook – guitar
- Norbert Putnam – bass
- Kenny Buttrey – drums
- Charlie McCoy – harmonica
- The A Strings – strings
- Bergen White – string arrangements

Recording studio

- Fred Foster – producer, liner notes
- Steve Mazur – assistant engineer
- Joseph M. Palmaccio – mastering
- Todd Parker, Tommy Strong – engineer
- John Christiana – packaging manager
- Howard Fritzson – art direction
- John Jackson – product manager
- Ken Kim – art direction, cover photography
- Randall Martin – design
- Al Quaglieri – reissue producer
- Nick Shaffran – series consultant
- Johnny Cash – liner notes
- Billy Swan – liner notes
