= I'll Say It's True =

Song by Johnny Cash

Single by Johnny Cash

from the album Silver
- A-side: "Cocaine Blues" "I'll Say It's True"
- Released: September 1, 1979
- Genre: Country
- Label: Columbia 1-11103
- Songwriter: J. R. Cash
- Producer: Brian Ahern

Johnny Cash singles chronology
"(Ghost) Riders in the Sky" (1979)	"I'll Say It's True" (1979)	"Wings in the Morning" (1980)

Audio
- "I'll Say It's True" on YouTube

"I'll Say It's True" is a song written by and originally recorded by Johnny Cash for his 25th anniversary album Silver (1979). The song features George Jones on backing vocals.

Released as a single in 1979 (Columbia 1-11103, with "Cocaine Blues" from the same album on the opposite side), "I'll Say It's True" reached number 42 on U.S. Billboard's country chart.

== Track listing ==
7" single (Columbia 1-11103, 1979)
No.	Title	Writer(s)	Length
1.	"Cocaine Blues"	T. J. "Red" Arnall	3:17
2.	"I'll Say It's True"	J. R. Cash	2:47

== Charts ==
Chart (1979)	Peak position
US Hot Country Songs (Billboard)	42
