= Johnny Cash the King/Tammy Wynette the Queen =

Johnny Cash the King and Tammy Wynette the Queen

Compilation album by Johnny Cash and Tammy Wynette
- Released: 1969
- Genre: Country
- Label: Columbia

Johnny Cash the King and Tammy Wynette the Queen is an album by American country singers Johnny Cash and Tammy Wynette, released on Columbia Records in 1969, with a second release in 1973. It is a Columbia Musical Treasury featuring two LPs from each artist.

== Track listing ==
1. A1 Johnny Cash – "I Walk the Line"
2. A2 Johnny Cash – "Green, Green Grass of Home"
3. A3 Johnny Cash – "Five Feet High and Rising"
4. A4 Johnny Cash – "The Sons of Katie Elder"
5. A5 Johnny Cash – "Happiness Is You"
6. B1 Johnny Cash – "The Ballad of Boot Hill"
7. B2 Johnny Cash – "Don't Take Your Guns to Town"
8. B3 Johnny Cash – "Folsom Prison Blues"
9. B4 Johnny Cash – "Girl In Saskatoon"
10. B5 Johnny Cash – "The Long Black Veil"
11. C1 Tammy Wynette – "D-I-V-O-R-C-E"
12. C2 Tammy Wynette – "Set Me Free"
13. C3 Tammy Wynette – "Your Good Girl's Gonna Go Bad"
14. C4 Tammy Wynette – "My Elusive Dreams" (vocals: David Houston)
15. C5 Tammy Wynette – "Kiss Away"
16. D1 Tammy Wynette – "I Don't Wanna Play House
17. D2 Tammy Wynette – "It's All Over" (vocals: David Houston)
18. D3 Tammy Wynette – "Don't Make Me Now"
19. D4 Tammy Wynette – "Take Me to Your World"
20. D5 Tammy Wynette – "I Stayed Long Enough"
