= I Walk the Line (soundtrack) =

Soundtrack album by Johnny Cash
- Released: November 23, 1970
- Recorded: 1970
- Genre: Country
- Length: 26:29
- Label: Columbia
- Producer: Bob Johnston

Johnny Cash chronology
The Johnny Cash Show (1970)	I Walk the Line (1970)	Little Fauss and Big Halsy (1970)

Singles from I Walk the Line
- 1. "Flesh and Blood" Released: November 16, 1970

I Walk the Line is a soundtrack album to the 1970 film of the same name starring Gregory Peck. Released that same year on Columbia Records, it is, in essence, a country album by Johnny Cash (his 36th), as the entire soundtrack is composed solely of Cash songs, including a rearranged version of the famous title song. Also included is "Flesh and Blood", a ballad written by Cash which reached the top of the Country charts. The album was released on CD in 1999 backed with the soundtrack Little Fauss and Big Halsy [Bear Family Records 4000127161307]. The Bear Family release features an alternate longer version of the title song.

== Track listing ==
All songs written by Johnny Cash except where noted.

No.	Title	Writer(s)	Length
1.	"Flesh and Blood"		2:39
2.	"I Walk the Line"		2:59*
3.	"Hungry"		1:40
4.	"This Town"		2:30
5.	"This Side of the Law"		2:54
6.	"Flesh and Blood" (instrumental version)		2:10
7.	"'Cause I Love You"		1:48
8.	"'Cause I Love You" (instrumental version)		1:46
9.	"The World's Gonna Fall on You"		2:06
10.	"Face of Despair"		3:36
11.	"Standing on the Promises" / "Amazing Grace"	Celso Carter / John Newton, Bill Walker	3:04
12.	"Cause I Love You" (Bear Family CD bonus track) (string instrumental)		0:27
13.	"Amazing Grace" (Bear Family CD bonus track)	John Newton, Bill Walker	2:01

*This is the running abbreviated time on the original Columbia vinyl release. The full version timed at 3:29 was released on the Bear Family CD I Walk The Line/Little Fauss And Big Halsy

== Personnel ==
- Johnny Cash – vocals, guitar
- Marshall Grant – bass guitar
- WS Holland – drums
- Bob Wootton – electric guitar
- The Carter Family – background vocals

== Charts ==
Album – Billboard (United States)

Year	Chart	Position
1970	Country Albums	9
1970	Pop Albums	176

Singles – Billboard (United States)

Year	Single	Chart	Position
1970	"Flesh and Blood"	Country Singles	1
1970	"Flesh and Blood"	Pop Singles	54
