= Little Fauss and Big Halsy (soundtrack) =

Soundtrack album by Johnny Cash
- Released: November 23, 1970
- Recorded: 1970
- Genre: Country
- Length: 34:29
- Label: Columbia
- Producer: Bob Johnston

Johnny Cash chronology
I Walk the Line (1970)	Little Fauss and Big Halsy (1970)	Man in Black (1971)

Little Fauss and Big Halsy is a soundtrack album to the 1970 film Little Fauss and Big Halsy. Released on Columbia Records the same year, it features primarily songs by country singer Johnny Cash (and is his 37th overall album, as well as one of three soundtrack albums he released in 1970). The album includes tracks written by Cash, Carl Perkins and Bob Dylan, as well as several tracks performed by Perkins, but did not chart.

Professional ratings
Review scores
Source	Rating
Allmusic	link

== Track listing ==
No.	Title	Writer(s)	Length
1.	"Rollin' Free"	Johnny Cash	2:24
2.	"Ballad of Little Fauss and Big Halsy"	Carl Perkins	2:29
3.	"Ballad of Little Fauss and Big Halsy" (instrumental version)	Carl Perkins	1:48
4.	"706 Union"	Carl Perkins	2:18
5.	"Little Man"	Johnny Cash	2:53
6.	"Little Man" (instrumental version)	Johnny Cash	2:41
7.	"Wanted Man"	Bob Dylan	2:54
8.	"Rollin' Free" (instrumental version)	Johnny Cash	2:38
9.	"True Love Is Greater Than Friendship"	Carl Perkins	2:36
10.	"Movin'"	Carl Perkins	3:04
11.	"Little Man" (instrumental version)	Johnny Cash	2:54
12.	"True Love Is Greater Than Friendship" (instrumental version)	Carl Perkins	3:18
13.	"Movin'" (instrumental version)	Carl Perkins	2:32

Note: Tracks 11–13 were not issued on the original vinyl release but were bonus tracks on the 1999 Bear Family CD reissue, I Walk the Line/Little Fauss and Big Halsy. "Wanted Man" had previously been performed on the live album, Johnny Cash at San Quentin.

== Personnel ==
- Johnny Cash - vocals (except track 9 and instrumental tracks), guitar
- Carl Perkins - vocals (track 9), guitar
- Bob Wootton - guitar
- Marshall Grant - bass guitar
- W.S. Holland - drums
- The Carter Family - vocals

== Charts ==
Album – Billboard (United States)

Year	Chart	Position
February 1971	Pop Albums	209
