= Live Recordings from the Louisiana Hayride =

Live at the Louisiana Hayride

Live album by June Carter
- Released: May 2003
- Genre: country
- Label: Relativity Entertainment

June Carter chronology
Wildwood Flower (2003)	Live at the Louisiana Hayride (2003)	Keep On The Sunny Side: June Carter Cash - Her Life In Music (2005)

Live Recordings from the Louisiana Hayride is a compilation album credited to Johnny Cash and June Carter featuring live musical and comedy performances primarily by Carter, along with additional performances in duet with her future husband, Cash, dating from the early 1960s on the Louisiana Hayride radio program.

Professional ratings
Review scores
Source	Rating
AllMusic	3/5 stars

== Track listing ==
1. "Thirty Days"
2. "Big Iron"
3. "Elvis Story & Poem"
4. "Gotta Travel On"
5. "He Don't Love Me Anymore"
6. "Bury Me Under the Weeping Willow"
7. "Poetry & Comedy Routine"
8. "Wildwood Flower"
9. "Where No One Stands Alone"
10. "Worried Man Blues"
11. "Poor 'Ol Heartsick Me"
12. "John Henry"
13. "The Heel"
14. "It Ain't Me, Babe"
  - With Johnny Cash
15. "Ballad of a Teenage Queen"
  - With Johnny Cash
