= The Johnny Cash Songbook =

Compilation album by Johnny Cash
- Released: 1972
- Recorded: 1958–1972
- Genre: Country
- Label: Harmony Records

Professional ratings
Review scores
Source	Rating
Allmusic	3/5 stars

The Johnny Cash Songbook is a compilation album released on Harmony Records in 1972. It contains 10 tracks, most of them from Cash's early Columbia days. This album peaked at #43 on the US charts.

== Side one ==
1. "Don't Take Your Guns to Town"
2. "I Walk the Line"
3. "I'm Gonna Try to Be That Way"
4. "Five Feet High and Rising"
5. "I Promise You"

== Side two ==
1. "Hey Porter"
2. "Give My Love to Rose"
3. "Big River"
4. "I Still Miss Someone"
5. "All of God's Children Ain't Free"
