= Wanted Man (Johnny Cash album) =

Compilation album by Johnny Cash
- Released: 1994
- Genre: Country; rockabilly
- Length: 32:16
- Label: Mercury
- Producer: Jack Clement

Johnny Cash chronology
Patriot (1992)	Wanted Man (1994)	American Recordings (1994)

Professional ratings
Review scores
Source	Rating
Allmusic link	2.5/5 stars

Wanted Man is a compilation album from country singer Johnny Cash and was released in 1994. This album contains some popular songs of Cash like "Wanted Man" and "The Night Hank Williams Came to Town"; it also has the remake of the song "Ballad of A Teenage Queen" (from the 1988 album Water from the Wells of Home).

Cash's re-recording of "Wanted Man" was featured in the closing credits of the 1994 western comedy Lightning Jack, starring Paul Hogan and Cuba Gooding Jr.

It should not be confused with Wanted Man, a later collection of hits released by Columbia Records.

== Track listing ==
No.	Title	Writer(s)	Length
1.	"The Night Hank Williams Came to Town"	Bobby Braddock, Charlie Williams	3:22
2.	"Let Him Roll"	Guy Clark	4:27
3.	"My Ship Will Sail"	Allen Reynolds	2:45
4.	"That Old Wheel" (with Hank Williams Jr.)	Jennifer Pierce	2:50
5.	"Ballad of a Teenage Queen" (with Rosanne Cash & The Everly Brothers)	Jack Clement	2:46
6.	"Beans for Breakfast"	Johnny Cash	3:17
7.	"Wanted Man"	Bob Dylan	2:51
8.	"The Greatest Cowboy of Them All" (1991 re-recording)	Johnny Cash	3:30
9.	"Goin' by the Book"	Chester Lester	3:18
10.	"I'll Go Somewhere and Sing My Songs Again" (with Tom T. Hall)	Tom T. Hall	3:10

== Charts ==
Album - (Canada)

Chart (1994)	Peak position
RPM Country Albums	15
