= Stephen Miller (writer) =

American author (born 1941)

Stephen Miller (born 29 March 1941) is an American author.

== Career ==
He was formerly a contributing editor to The Wilson Quarterly.

== Books ==
- Three Deaths and Enlightenment Thought: Hume, Johnson, Marat (Bucknell University Press, 2001)
- Walking New York: Reflections of American Writers from Walt Whitman to Teju Cole (Fordham University Press, 2014)
- The Peculiar Life of Sundays (Harvard University Press, 2008)
- Conversation: A History of a Declining Art (Yale University Press, 2007)
- Excellence & Equity : the National Endowment for the Humanities (University of Kentucky Press, 1984)
