= What Is Truth =

1970 single by Johnny Cash

Single by Johnny Cash
- B-side: "Sing a Traveling Song"
- Released: February 1970
- Genre: Country; folk; talking blues; protest song
- Length: 2:37
- Label: Columbia
- Songwriter: Johnny Cash
- Producer: Bob Johnston

Johnny Cash singles chronology
"Rock Island Line" (1970)	"What Is Truth" (1970)	"Sunday Morning Coming Down" (1970)

"What Is Truth" is a song written and recorded by American country singer-songwriter Johnny Cash released in February 1970.

== Background ==
Johnny Cash's recording is generally viewed as a protest song, a rarity in country music at the time; its criticism of the Vietnam War and the generation gap made the song a major crossover hit. Cash played this song in front of Richard Nixon in the White House on April 17, 1970.

== Chart performance ==
The song peaked at number 3 on the Billboard Hot Country Singles. It also became Cash's 12th top 40 single on the Hot 100 chart, peaking at number 19, and his second top 10 single on the Adult Contemporary chart, peaking at number 4. It also reached number one on the RPM Country Tracks chart in Canada, and number 21 on the UK Singles Chart.

Chart (1970)	Peak position
US Hot Country Songs (Billboard)	3
US Billboard Hot 100	19
U.S. Billboard Easy Listening	4
Canadian RPM Country Tracks	1
Canadian RPM Top Singles	9
U.K. Singles Chart	21
