= Singing in Viet Nam Talking Blues =

Song by Johnny Cash

Single by Johnny Cash

from the album Man in Black
- B-side: "You've Got a New Light Shining"
- Released: 1971
- Genre: Country, talking blues, protest song
- Label: Columbia 4-45393
- Songwriter: Johnny Cash
- Producer: Johnny Cash

Johnny Cash singles chronology
"Man in Black" (1971)	"Singing in Viet Nam Talking Blues" (1971)	"Papa Was a Good Man" (1971)

Audio
- "Singing in Viet Nam Talking Blues" on YouTube

"Singing in Viet Nam Talking Blues" (or "Singin' in Viet Nam Talkin' Blues") is a song written and originally recorded by Johnny Cash.

Released in May 1971 as the second single (Columbia 4-45393, with "You've Got a New Light Shining" on the opposite side) from Cash's that year's album Man in Black, the song reached #18 on U.S. Billboard's country chart and #124 on Billboard's Bubbling Under the Hot 100.

== Analysis ==
While [the first single] "Man in Black" wore its political overtones on its dark sleeve, the next single from the album [Man in Black] was perhaps Cash's most political to date. "Singin' in Viet Nam Talkin' Blues" is about a trip Cash and his crew took to Vietnam to entertain the troops, detailing the "livin' hell" he witnessed, and ending with a hope that, if ever he is to return, it will be after the war is over, by which time all of "our boys" will be home and safe.

— C. Eric Banister. Johnny Cash FAQ: All That's Left to Know About the Man in Black

As implied by its title, the Cash composition is a talking blues, with a longish ostinato accompaniment by guitars, bass drum, and acoustic bass in a country style (country-style finger picking in the guitars and archetypical root-fifth oscillations in the bass) backing up the narrative text.

— James E. Perone. Songs of the Vietnam Conflict

== Track listing ==
7" single (Columbia 4-45393, 1971)
No.	Title	Writer(s)	Length
1.	"Singing In Viet Nam Talking Blues"	Johnny Cash	2:55
2.	"You've Got a New Light Shining"	Johnny Cash	2:02

== Charts ==
Chart (1971)	Peak position
US Bubbling Under Hot 100 (Billboard)	124
US Hot Country Songs (Billboard)	18
