= Man in Black (album) =

Studio album by Johnny Cash
- Released: May 31, 1971
- Recorded: 1971
- Genre: Country; folk; blues; gospel
- Length: 28:45
- Language: English
- Label: Columbia
- Producer: Johnny Cash

Johnny Cash chronology
Little Fauss and Big Halsy (1971)	Man in Black (1971)	Greatest Hits, Vol. 2 (1971)

Singles from Man in Black
- 1. "Man in Black" Released: February 26, 1971; 2. "Singing in Viet Nam Talking Blues" Released: May 20, 1971

Man in Black is a 1971 album by country singer Johnny Cash, released on Columbia Records. Many of the songs on the album contain political references, either broad or specific, while the title song refers both to Cash's tendency to wear black at live shows and to the tumultuous times in which the song was created, implying the Vietnam War. The album's name also eventually became Cash's informal nickname, given to him by the public. Two tracks — "Man in Black" and "Singin' in Vietnam Talkin' Blues" — were released as singles, the former peaking at No. 3 on the Country chart. The first track features Billy Graham.

== Reception ==
Professional ratings
Review scores
Source	Rating
AllMusic	3/5 stars

== Track listing ==
No.	Title	Writer(s)	Length
1.	"The Preacher Said Jesus Said" (with Billy Graham)	Johnny Cash	3:39
2.	"Orphan of the Road"	Deena Kaye Rose	3:36
3.	"You've Got a New Light Shining in Your Eyes"	Cash	2:05
4.	"If Not for Love"	Glenn Douglas Tubb, Larry Lee	3:06
5.	"Man in Black"	Cash	2:52
6.	"Singin' in Viet Nam Talkin' Blues"	Cash	2:58
7.	"Ned Kelly"	Cash	2:19
8.	"Look for Me" (with June Carter Cash)	Glen Sherley, Harlan Sanders	2:21
9.	"Dear Mrs."	Cash, Andrew J. Arnette, Jnr.	3:46
10.	"I Talk to Jesus Every Day" (with June Carter Cash)	Glenn Douglas Tubb	2:03
Total length:			28:45

== Personnel ==
- Johnny Cash – vocals, acoustic guitar, production
- Norman Blake – acoustic guitar
- June Carter Cash – vocals
- Marshall Grant – bass guitar
- Billy Graham – vocals on "The Preacher Said Jesus Said"
- W. S. Holland – drums
- Farrell Morris – percussion
- Carl Perkins – electric guitar
- Jerry Shook – acoustic guitar
- Bob Wootton – electric guitar

Technical

- Charlie Bragg – engineer
- Bill Grein – photography

== Charts ==
Album – Billboard (United States)

Year	Chart	Position
1971	Country Albums	1
1971	Top LPs	56

Singles – Billboard (United States)

Year	Single	Chart	Position
1971	"Man in Black"	Country Singles	3
1971	"Man in Black"	Pop Singles	58
1971	"Singing in Viet Nam Talking Blues"	Country Singles	18
