= Man in Black (song) =

Song by Johnny Cash

- German release picture sleeve

Single by Johnny Cash

from the album Man in Black
- B-side: "Little Bit of Yesterday"
- Released: March 1971
- Recorded: 1971
- Genre: Country folk, protest song
- Length: 2:52
- Label: Columbia
- Songwriter: Johnny Cash
- Producer: Johnny Cash

Johnny Cash singles chronology
| "Flesh and Blood" (1970) | "Man in Black" (1971) | "Singin' in Vietnam Talkin' Blues" (1971) |

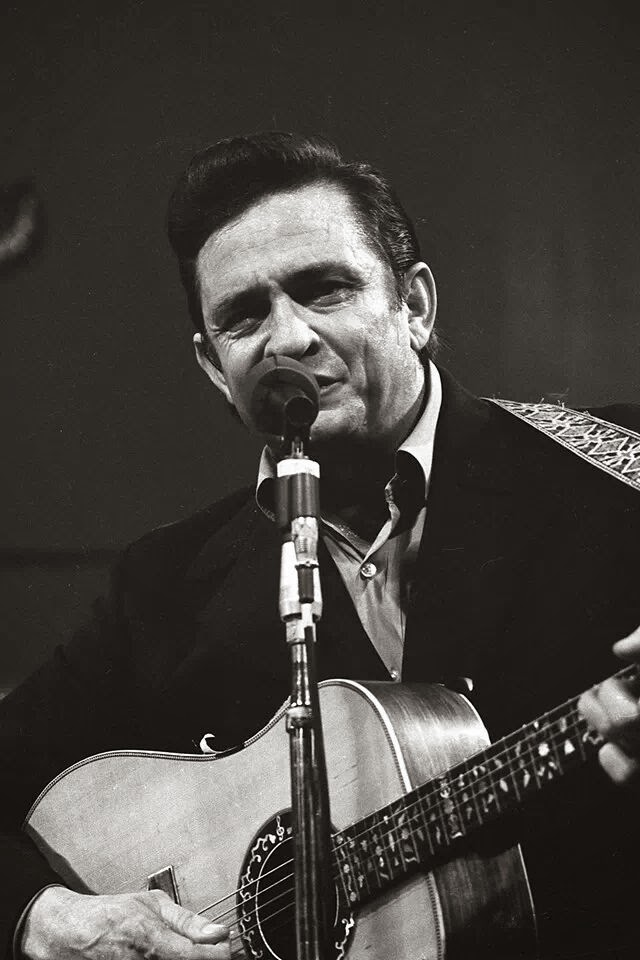
Cash in black at his legendary 1969 performance at San Quentin

"Man in Black" (or "The Man in Black") is a protest song written and recorded by singer-songwriter Johnny Cash, originally released on his 1971 album of the same name. Cash himself was known as "The Man in Black" for his distinctive style of on-stage costuming. The lyrics are an after-the-fact explanation of this with the entire song a protest statement against the treatment of poor people by wealthy politicians, mass incarceration, and the Vietnam War.

In the intro to his first performance of the song, Cash revealed he had talked to some of the audience members from Vanderbilt University that weekend, and was inspired to write "Man in Black," revising it a few times just before the concert on Wednesday. He performed the song using cards with the just-revised lyrics. At the end of the song he received a standing ovation. The song was the opening track of the posthumous Cash album, Johnny Cash and the Royal Philharmonic Orchestra in 2020.

In 1991, Christian punk band One Bad Pig recorded a version on their album I Scream Sunday, in which Johnny Cash made a guest appearance. In 1993, Spanish rock band Loquillo y Trogloditas recorded a cover of the song in Spanish for their album Mientras respiremos. In 2020, Andy Allo released a cover of this song.

== Chart performance ==
| Chart (1971) | Peak position |
|---|---|
| US Hot Country Songs (Billboard) | 3 |
| US Billboard Hot 100 | 58 |
