= Sunday Mornin' Comin' Down =

1969 song written by Kris Kristofferson

- German release picture sleeve

Single by Ray Stevens

from the album Have a Little Talk with Myself
- B-side: "The Minority"
- Released: 1969
- Studio: Monument Recording, Nashville, Tennessee
- Genre: Pop, country
- Length: 4:25
- Label: Monument
- Songwriter: Kris Kristofferson
- Producers: Jim Malloy, Ray Stevens

Ray Stevens singles chronology
"Along Came Jones" (1969)	"Sunday Mornin' Comin' Down" (1969)	"Have a Little Talk with Myself" (1970)

"Sunday Mornin' Comin' Down" is a song written by Kris Kristofferson that was recorded in 1969 by Ray Stevens before becoming a No. 1 hit on the Billboard US Country chart for Johnny Cash.

== History ==
Stevens' version of the song reached No. 55 on the Billboard Hot Country Singles chart and No.81 on the Hot 100 pop chart in 1969. In 2021, it was listed at #476 on Rolling Stone's "Top 500 Best Songs of All Time". It also appeared on the author's own album Kristofferson.

In a 2013 interview, Kris Kristofferson said the song "opened up a whole lot of doors for me. So many people that I admired, admired it. Actually, it was the song that allowed me to quit working for a living."

== Critical reception ==
In 2024, Rolling Stone ranked the song at No. 96 on its 200 Greatest Country Songs of All Time ranking.

== Johnny Cash version ==
"Sunday Morning Coming Down"

Single by Johnny Cash

from the album The Johnny Cash Show
- B-side: "I'm Gonna Try to Be That Way"
- Released: 1970
- Genre: Country
- Length: 4:04
- Label: Columbia
- Songwriter: Kris Kristofferson
- Producer: Bob Johnston

Johnny Cash singles chronology
"What Is Truth" (1970)	"Sunday Morning Coming Down" (1970)	"Flesh and Blood" (1970)

The biggest success on disc for the song came from a Johnny Cash performance that had been recorded live at the Ryman Auditorium during a taping of The Johnny Cash Show as part of a "Ride This Train" segment, with filmed background visuals showing a down-and-out wanderer roaming around the Public Square area of Shelbyville, Tennessee. Cash introduced the song with the following monologue:

You know, not everyone who has been on 'the bum' wanted it that way. The Great Depression of the 30s set the feet of thousands of people—farmers, city workers—it set 'em to ridin' the rails. My Daddy was one of those who hopped a freight train a couple of times to go and look for work. He wasn't a bum. He was a hobo but he wasn't a bum. I suppose we've all....all of us 'been at one time or another 'drifter at heart', and today like yesterday there's many that are on that road headin' out. Not searchin' maybe for work, as much as for self-fulfillment, or understanding of their life...trying to find a *meaning* for their life. And they're not hoppin' freights much anymore. Instead they're thumbin' cars and diesel trucks along the highways from Maine to Mexico. And many who have drifted...including myself...have found themselves no closer to peace of mind than a dingy backroom, on some lonely Sunday morning, with it comin' down all around you.

With the monologue edited off, the recording would appear on the soundtrack LP The Johnny Cash Show the following year, as well as being issued as a single (Columbia Records 4-45211). Cash's version won the Country Music Association Award for Song of the Year in 1970 and hit #1 on the country chart.

This version was used in the Columbo episode "Swan Song" in 1974, in which Cash performed it during a garden party.

According to Kristofferson, network executives ordered Cash to change the line "I'm wishing Lord that I was stoned" when he performed the song on his TV show, but he refused to comply.

== Other notable versions ==
- Waylon Jennings recorded the song on his 1971 album The Taker/Tulsa, which included two other songs penned by his friend Kristofferson.
- Gretchen Wilson recorded her take on the song for the Kris Kristofferson tribute The Pilgrim: A Celebration of Kris Kristofferson in 2006 to celebrate Kristofferson's 70th birthday.
- Louis Neefs recorded a version in Dutch, titled "Zondagmiddag Lillian".
- Vikki Carr recorded a version on her 1970 album Nashville By Carr.
- Kris Kristofferson recorded his own version for his 1970 album Kristofferson.

== In popular culture ==
Mohamed El-Erian, then co-chief investment officer of Pacific Investment Management, used the phrase "cleanest dirty shirt" in a 2010 television interview to refer to the United States among major economies in the situation after the 2008 financial crisis. He credited the saying to his colleague Paul McCulley, who was then PIMCO's chief economist; El-Erian and his co-CIO Bill Gross often repeated it in interviews during that era. The description was widely used to refer to American Exceptionalism in finance and economics at least through the end of 2024.

McCulley told Forbes in 2024 that he was consciously referencing Kristofferson's song, which includes the lyric "Then I fumbled through my closet for my clothes/And found my cleanest dirty shirt. "

"I was fully aware that I was ‘borrowing’ the phrase from Kris Kristofferson, who penned that Johnny Cash hit", said McCulley. "I'm a huge fan of Kristofferson, as well as Jackson Browne, two of the finest poets of our generation."

== Chart performance ==
=== Ray Stevens ===
Chart (1969)	Peak position
US Hot Country Songs (Billboard)	55
US Billboard Hot 100	81
Canadian RPM Country Tracks	46
Canadian RPM Top Singles	59

=== Johnny Cash ===
Chart (1970)	Peak position
US Hot Country Songs (Billboard)	1
US Billboard Hot 100	46
US Billboard Adult Contemporary	13
Canadian RPM Country Tracks	1
Canadian RPM Top Singles	30
