= Flesh and Blood (song) =

- German release picture sleeve

Single by Johnny Cash

from the album I Walk the Line (soundtrack album)
- B-side: "This Side of the Law"
- Released: October 1970
- Genre: Country
- Length: 2:39
- Label: Columbia
- Songwriter: Johnny Cash
- Producer: Bob Johnston

Johnny Cash singles chronology
"Sunday Morning Coming Down" (1970)	"Flesh and Blood" (1970)	"Big River" (1971)

"Flesh and Blood" is a 1970 single written and recorded by Johnny Cash and was featured in the film, I Walk the Line starring Gregory Peck (see: soundtrack album I Walk the Line). The song went to #1 on the U.S. country singles chart for one week, spending a total of 13 weeks on the chart.

== Content ==
The song describes a man observing and interacting with nature, but noting that it is no substitute for a human partner: "flesh and blood needs flesh and blood."

== Chart performance ==
Chart (1970–1971)	Peak position
US Hot Country Songs (Billboard)	1
US Billboard Hot 100	54
Canadian RPM Country Tracks	1
Canadian RPM Top Singles	41
Canadian RPM Adult Contemporary Tracks	23
