= Ghost Riders in the Sky =

Country and western song

"(Ghost) Riders in the Sky: A Cowboy Legend"

Song
- Published: 1948, Edwin H. Morris & Co Inc
- Released: June 5, 1948
- Genre: Country, western
- Songwriter: Stan Jones

"(Ghost) Riders in the Sky"

Single by Johnny Cash

from the album Silver
- B-side: "I'm Gonna Sit on the Porch and Pick on My Old Guitar"
- Released: April 28, 1979
- Recorded: March 27 – April 9, 1979
- Studio: Jack Clement Recording (Nashville, Tennessee)
- Genre: Country, outlaw country, country rock, western
- Length: 3:45
- Label: Columbia
- Songwriter: Stan Jones
- Producer: Brian Ahern

Johnny Cash singles chronology
"I Will Rock and Roll with You" (1978)	"(Ghost) Riders in the Sky" (1979)	"I'll Say It's True" (1979)

"Ghost Riders in the Sky" (Note: The ASCAP database lists the song as "Riders in the Sky" (title code 480028324), but the title has been written as "Ghost Riders", "Ghost Riders in the Sky", and "A Cowboy Legend".) is a country and western song written in 1948 by American songwriter Stan Jones.

A number of versions were crossover hits on the pop charts in 1949, the most successful being by Vaughn Monroe. Members of the Western Writers of America chose it as the greatest western song of all time.

== Overview ==
The song tells a folk tale of a cowboy who has a vision of red-eyed, steel-hooved cattle thundering across the sky, being chased by the spirits of damned cowboys. One warns him that if he does not change his ways, he will be doomed to join them, forever "trying to catch the Devil's herd across these endless skies". The story has been linked with old European myths of the Wild Hunt and the Dutch/Flemish legend of the Buckriders, in which a supernatural group of hunters passes the narrator in wild pursuit.

Stan Jones stated that he had been told the story when he was 12 years old by an old Native American who resided north-east of the Douglas, Arizona, border town, a few miles behind D Hill, north of Agua Prieta, Sonora. The Native Americans, possibly Apache, who lived within Cochise County, believed that when souls vacate their physical bodies, they reside as spirits in the sky, resembling ghost riders. He related this story to Wayne Hester, a boyhood friend (later owner of the Douglas Cable Company). As both boys were looking at the clouds, Stan shared what the old Native American had told him, looking in amazement as the cloudy shapes were identified as the "ghost riders" that years later, would be transposed into lyrics. The melody is based on the Civil War-era popular song "When Johnny Comes Marching Home".

Hundreds of performers have recorded versions of the song. Vaughn Monroe reached number 1 in Billboard magazine with his version ("Riders in the Sky" with orchestra and vocal quartet). Other artists that made the charts with the song include The Outlaws, Bing Crosby (with the Ken Darby Singers), Frankie Laine, Burl Ives (two different versions), Marty Robbins, The Ramrods and Johnny Cash.

== Notable and charting recordings ==
- The original version by Stan Jones was recorded in late 1948 or early 1949. A recording by Stan Jones and his Death Valley Rangers was issued on Mercury 5320 in May 1949. Fellow songwriter Eden Ahbez, the composer of the Nat 'King' Cole million-seller, "Nature Boy", sent the song to Burl Ives, who recorded his own version in early 1949.
- Burl Ives recorded the song on February 17, 1949, and the song was released by Columbia Records as catalog No. 38445. The recording first appeared on the Billboard charts on April 22, 1949, lasting six weeks and peaking at No. 21.
- A version by Vaughn Monroe and His Orchestra with Vaughn Monroe and The Moon Men on vocals, was recorded on March 14, 1949, and released by RCA Victor Records as catalog No. 20-3411 (in USA) and by EMI on the His Master's Voice label as catalog No. BD 1247, HN 3014, HQ 2071, IM 1425 and GY 878. The recording first appeared on the Billboard charts on April 15, 1949, lasting 22 weeks and reaching No. 1. Billboard ranked it as the No. 1 song for 1949.
- Bing Crosby recorded a version on March 22, 1949, released by Decca Records as catalog No. 24618. The recording first appeared on the Billboard charts on May 6, 1949, lasting six weeks and peaking at No. 14.
- Peggy Lee recorded a version on April 18, 1949, released by Capitol Records as catalog No. 57-608. It reached No. 2 on Billboard's Most Played By Disc Jockeys listing without appearing in the retail Top 30.
- Spike Jones recorded a version in 1950 with his band The City Slickers on the b-side of their single "Chinese Mule Train" RCA Victor Records as catalog No. 20-37 41), which made reference to the stolen melody. In the last verse, they sing: "When Johnny comes marching home again, hooray, hooray / He'll make the guy who wrote this song pay and pay / 'Cos all we hear is "Ghost Riders" sung by Vaughn Monroe / I can go without his singing, but I wish I had his dough."
- The Ramrods released an instrumental rock version in 1961 with overdubbed shouts, whistles and cattle calls. The record was made a "Pick of the Week" by Cash Box, and rose to No. 30 on the Billboard Hot 100 chart, No. 4 in Canada, and No. 8 on the UK singles chart.
- Lawrence Welk and His Orchestra released an instrumental version in 1961, featuring Neil LeVang on guitar, which spent three weeks on the Billboard Hot 100 chart, reaching No. 87.
- Psychedelic folk rock band Kaleidoscope recorded a version for their album, When Scopes Collide (Pacific Arts, 1976).
- Yugoslav rock band Iskre recorded an instrumental version entitled "Nebeski jahači" ("Sky Riders"), releasing it on their 1965 EP Bossa Nova.
- Johnny Cash recorded a version for the album Silver which was released by Columbia Records as catalog No. 3-10961 on April 1, 1979. It first appeared on Billboard's Hot Country Singles & Tracks chart on April 15, 1979, lasting 16 weeks and peaking at No. 2 on July 27.
- Riders in the Sky included a version on their debut album Three on the Trail released by Rounder Records Group in 1979.
- An instrumental version by the Shadows reached No. 12 on the UK Singles Chart in January 1980.
- The Outlaws included a recording on their 1980 album Ghost Riders that omitted the last verse. This version spent 15 weeks on the Billboard Hot 100, peaking at number 31 in March 1981. In Canada it was number 15 for three weeks and in the top 50 for 12 weeks. This version of the song is used by professional wrestler "Hangman" Adam Page, who first used it at the All Elite Wrestling Revolution pay-per-view event on March 5, 2023.
- The Blues Brothers recorded the song for the soundtrack of the 1998 film Blues Brothers 2000.
- Ned Sublette recorded the song, in a Cuban-influenced style, on his 1999 album Cowboy Rumba.
- Death metal band Children of Bodom recorded a version of the song, which was released on US and Japanese versions of their 2009 compilation album, Skeletons in the Closet.
- Mexican ballad rock band Los Baby's instrumental version of the song from their 2017 tribute album features Rock en Español guitarists Alejandro Marcovich from Caifanes and Paco Huidobro from Fobia.
- Heavy metal band DevilDriver collaborated with Johnny Cash's son, John Carter Cash and his partner Ana Cristina Cash as well as Randy Blythe from Lamb of God in covering the song.
- The Spiderbait cover version of the song was featured in the 2007 film Ghost Rider, and it plays during the scene where Carter Slade (played by Sam Elliot) has his last ride with Johnny Blaze (played by Nicolas Cage) to the town of San Venganza.
- Country music star Aaron Tippin recorded and released the song and video for the soundtrack of The Isolate Thief in 2026.
