= Stan Jones (songwriter) =

American western songwriter (1914–1963)

- Born: Stanley Davis Jones; June 5, 1914; Douglas, Arizona, U.S.
- Died: December 13, 1963 (aged 49); Los Angeles, California, U.S.
- Burial place: Julia Page Memorial Park
- Education: University of California, Berkeley
- Occupation: Songwriter
- Children: 2

Stanley "Slick" Davis Jones (June 5, 1914 – December 13, 1963) was an American singer and songwriter, primarily writing Western music. He is best remembered for writing "Ghost Riders in the Sky".

== Early life ==
Jones was born in Douglas, Arizona, and grew up on a ranch. His physician father was one of the first settlers in Cochise County, Arizona. When his father died, his mother moved the family to Los Angeles, California. He earned a master's degree in zoology from the University of California, Berkeley and competed in rodeos to make money. However, he dropped out in 1934 to join the United States Navy. After his discharge, he worked at many jobs, including as a miner, a fire fighter, and a park ranger.

== Musical career ==
In his free time he wrote songs, and eventually more than 100 were recorded. His most famous, "(Ghost) Riders in the Sky", was written in 1948 (or 1949) when he worked for the National Park Service in Death Valley, California. As the guide for a group of Hollywood scouts who were looking at potential locations for films, he sang "Riders in the Sky" when they wanted to hear a sample of campfire music.

Assigned as technical advisor to the filming of The Walking Hills, he became friends with director John Ford, who opened his way into Hollywood.

Jones wrote almost entirely Western music. He composed songs for several Western films by Ford and others producers, including The Searchers and Rio Grande. He also played small parts in several westerns.

In 1955 Jones began writing for Disney Studios. He was co-writer of the theme song for the television series Cheyenne, and Jones wrote again for John Ford's Civil War film The Horse Soldiers, in which he made an uncredited appearance as Ulysses S. Grant in the opening scene. The theme song "I Left My Love" was featured throughout the film. The following year, he returned to working for Disney Studios.

He played Wilson W. Brown, a Union soldier and locomotive engineer who was a member of the Andrews Raid depicted in Disney's film The Great Locomotive Chase. In his final film, Ten Who Dared, Jones appeared as Seneca Howland, a member of John Wesley Powell's 1869 expedition. He also is credited with writing "Jolly Rovers" and "Roll Along", which he sang in this film.

Three of his songs, "(Ghost) Riders in the Sky", the theme from The Searchers, and "Cowpoke", were chosen by members of the Western Writers of America as being among the Top 100 Western songs of all time.

== Personal life ==
Jones married twice. He had a daughter with his first wife, but later gave up all parental rights. His second marriage produced one son.

== Death ==
Jones died from cancer in Los Angeles in 1963 at the age of 49. He was buried at Calvary Memorial Park in his hometown, Douglas, Arizona.

== Recognition ==
In 1997, he was posthumously inducted into the Western Music Association Hall of Fame.

== Discography ==
=== 78 rpm, 10" single ===
Riders In The Sky/I wish I Could Call You My Sweetheart (Mercury 5320), 1949, with Death Valley Rangers.

=== LPs ===
Issued on the Disneyland label.

Creakin' Leather LP (WDL-3015) released in 1958. A collection of 13 Western ballards written and composed by Jones.

Songs of the National Parks LP (WDL-1005), 1958. Stan Jones and the Ranger Chorus, narrated by Thurl Ravenscroft. Limited sale outlets.

=== 45 rpm, 7" singles ===
Issued on the Disneyland label, except *.

Too Young to Marry/Creakin' Leather (F-056) (released in 1957).

Sings the Theme from 'Sheriff of Conchise'/Theme from 'Cheyenne' (F-064), 1958.

In Missouri/Brian's Song or The Piney Woods (F-068) with The Deputies.

Nine Lives of Elfego Baca/Texas John Slaughter (F-113), 1958.

Song of the Dance Hall Girls/The Lillies Grow High (F-121), 1959.

Ghost Riders in the Sky/Wringle Wrangle (F-371), 1960, *Buena Vista label.

== Filmography ==
Year	Title	Role	Notes
1950	Rio Grande	Sergeant	
1951	Whirlwind	Rider	Uncredited
1952	The Last Musketeer	Sheriff Blake	
1956	The Great Locomotive Chase	Wilson W. Brown	
1956	The Rainmaker	Townsman	Uncredited
1959	The Horse Soldiers	Gen. Ulysses S. Grant	Uncredited
1960	Ten Who Dared	Seneca Howland	
1964	Invitation to a Gunfighter		Uncredited, (final film role)
