= List of awards and nominations received by Johnny Cash =

This is a list of major awards won by Johnny Cash.

== Wins ==
Academy of Country Music

- 1969 Television Personality of the Year
- 1970 Television Personality of the Year
- 1985 Single of the Year as part of The Highwaymen – "Highwayman"
- 1990 Pioneer Award

American Music Awards

- 1986 Favorite Country Video "Highwayman" with Willie Nelson, Waylon Jennings and Kris Kristofferson

Americana Music Association

- 2002 "Spirit of Americana" Free Speech Award
- 2003 Album of the Year – American IV: The Man Comes Around
- 2003 Artist of the Year
- 2003 Song of the Year - "Hurt"

Country Music Association

- 1968 Album of the Year – "At Folsom Prison"
- 1969 Album of the Year – "At San Quentin"
- 1969 Entertainer of the Year
- 1969 Male Vocalist of the Year
- 1969 Single of the Year – "A Boy Named Sue"
- 1969 Vocal Group of the Year with June Carter Cash
- 2003 Album of the Year – "American IV: The Man Comes Around"
- 2003 Single of the Year – "Hurt"
- 2003 Music Video of the Year – "Hurt"

Grammy Awards

- 1968 Best Country & Western Performance, Duet, Trio Or Group with June Carter Cash – "Jackson"
- 1969 Best Album Notes – "At Folsom Prison"
- 1969 Best Country Vocal Performance, Male – "Folsom Prison Blues"
- 1970 Best Album Notes – "Nashville Skyline"
- 1970 Best Country Vocal Performance, Male – "A Boy Named Sue"
- 1971 Best Country Performance by a Duo or Group with Vocal with June Carter Cash – "If I Were A Carpenter"
- 1987 Best Spoken Word or Non-musical Album with Carl Perkins, Chips Moman. Jerry Lee Lewis, Ricky Nelson, Roy Orbison and Sam Philips – "Interviews from the Class of '55 Recording Sessions"
- 1995 Best Contemporary Folk Album – "American Recordings"
- 1998 Best Country Album – "Unchained"
- 1998 Grammy Hall of Fame Award – "I Walk The Line"
- 1998 Grammy Hall of Fame Award – "Ring of Fire"
- 1999 Grammy Lifetime Achievement Award
- 2001 Best Male Country Vocal Performance – "Solitary Man"
- 2001 Grammy Hall of Fame Award – "Folsom Prison Blues"
- 2002 Best Country Album – Awarded to various artists for contributions to Timeless, a Hank Williams Tribute album.
- 2003 Best Male Country Vocal Performance – "Give My Love To Rose"
- 2004 Best Country Album – Awarded to various artists for contributions to Livin', Lovin', Losin': Songs of the Louvin Brothers.
- 2004 Grammy Hall of Fame Award – At San Quentin
- 2004 Best Short Form Video – "Hurt"
- 2008 Best Short Form Video – "God's Gonna Cut You Down"
- 2018 Grammy Hall of Fame Award – At Folsom Prison

== Hall of fame inductions ==
Country Music Hall of Fame and Museum

- Inducted in 1980

Cheyenne Frontier Days Old West Museum

- Cheyenne Frontier Days Hall of Fame Inducted in 2003

Gospel Music Hall of Fame

- Inducted in 2011

Memphis Music Hall of Fame

- Inducted in 2013

Nashville Songwriters Hall of Fame

- Inducted in 1977

Rockabilly Hall of Fame

- 115th Inductee

Rock and Roll Hall of Fame

- Inducted in 1992

== Other awards ==
Hollywood Walk of Fame

- on February 8, 1960

Horatio Alger Award

- Awarded in 1977

Golden Plate Award of the American Academy of Achievement

- Awarded in 1988

Kennedy Center Honors

- Awarded in 1996

MTV Video Music Awards

- 2003 Best Cinematography – "Hurt"

National Medal of Arts

- Awarded in 2001

NME

- Greatest music video of all time – "Hurt"

== Nominations ==
Academy of Country Music

- 1965 Top Male Vocalist
- 1969 Album of the Year At Folsom Prison
- 1969 Single Record of the Year A Boy Named Sue
- 1969 Song of the Year A Boy Named Sue
- 1969 Specialty Instrument of the Year - Harmonica
- 1969 Television Personality of the Year
- 1969 Top Male Vocalist
- 1970 Entertainer of the Year
- 1970 Song of the Year Sunday Mornin' Comin' Down
- 1970 Television Personality of the Year
- 1971 Television Personality of the Year
- 1985 Album of the Year as part of The Highwaymen for the album Highwayman
- 1985 Video of the Year for the video for the single "Highwayman"
- 2000 Album of the Year American III: Solitary Man

Country Music Association Awards

- 1967 Vocal Group of the Year with June Carter Cash
- 1968 Entertainer of the Year
- 1968 Male Vocalist of the Year
- 1968 Single of the Year Folsom Prison Blues
- 1968 Vocal Group of the Year with June Carter Cash
- 1969 Single of the Year Daddy Sang Bass
- 1970 Album of the Year Hello, I'm Johnny Cash
- 1970 Entertainer of the Year
- 1970 Male Vocalist of the Year
- 1970 Vocal Duo of the Year with June Carter Cash
- 1971 Vocal Duo of the Year with June Carter Cash
- 1985 Music Video of the Year "Highwayman"
- 1985 Single of the Year "Highwayman"
- 1989 Vocal Event of the Year "That Old Wheel" with Hank Williams, Jr.
- 1989 Vocal Event of the Year "Ballad of a Teenage Queen with Rosanne Cash and The Everly Brothers
- 1990 Vocal Event of the Year "Highwayman 2 with Willie Nelson, Waylon Jennings and Kris Kristofferson
- 1991 Vocal Event of the Year "Highwayman 2 with Willie Nelson, Waylon Jennings and Kris Kristofferson
- 1994 Vocal Event of the Year "The Devil Comes Back To Georgia" with Mark O'Connor, Marty Stuart, Charlie Daniels and Travis Tritt
- 2003 Vocal Event of the Year "Tears in the Holston River" with The Nitty Gritty Dirt Band

Grammy Awards

- 1969 Album of the Year - At San Quentin
- 1969 Record of the Year - A Boy Named Sue
- 1970 Best Country Vocal Performance, Male - Sunday Mornin' Comin' Down
- 1972 Best Country Vocal Performance by a Duo or Group with June Carter Cash - "If I Had a Hammer"
- 1986 Best Country Performance by a Duo or Group with Vocal as part of The Highwaymen for the song Highwayman
- 1987 Best Country Performance by a Duo or Group with Vocal with Carl Perkins, Chips Moman. Jerry Lee Lewis, Ricky Nelson, Roy Orbison and Sam Philips – "Interviews from the Class of '55 Recording Sessions"
- 1990 Best Country Vocal Collaboration with Roy Acuff, Emmylou Harris, Levon Helm, The Nitty Gritty Dirt Band and Ricky Skaggs - "Will The Circle Be Unbroken"
- 1991 Best Country Vocal Collaboration with Willie Nelson, Waylon Jennings and Kris Kristofferson - "Highwayman 2"
- 1995 Best Country Vocal Collaboration with Mark O'Connor, Marty Stuart, Charlie Daniels and Travis Tritt - "The Devil Comes Back To Georgia"
- 1998 Best Male Country Vocal Performance - "Rusty Cage"
- 2001 Best Male Country Vocal Performance - "I Dreamed About Mama Last Night"
- 2002 Best Country Collaboration with Vocals with Fiona Apple - "Bridge Over Troubled Water"
- 2003 Best Country Collaboration with Vocals with June Carter Cash - "Temptation"
- 2004 Best Pop Collaboration with Vocals with Joe Strummer - "Redemption Song"
- 2005 Best Male Country Vocal Performance - "Engine One-Forty-Three"

MTV Video Music Awards

- 2003 MTV Video Music Award for Best Art Direction
- 2003 MTV Video Music Award for Best Direction
- 2003 MTV Video Music Award for Best Editing
- 2003 MTV Video Music Award for Best Male Video
- 2003 MTV Video Music Award for Video of the Year
