= A Concert Behind Prison Walls =

A Concert: Behind Prison Walls

Live album by Johnny Cash
- Released: September 23, 2003
- Recorded: 1974
- Venue: Tennessee State Prison, Nashville, Tennessee
- Genre: Country; rockabilly; folk
- Length: 47:47
- Label: Eagle

Johnny Cash chronology
| One Piece at a Time (1976) | A Concert: Behind Prison Walls (2003) | The Last Gunfighter Ballad (1977) |

Professional ratings
Review scores
| Source | Rating |
|---|---|
| AllMusic | 2.5/5 stars |

A Concert: Behind Prison Walls is the fifty-fourth overall album and a live album recorded by Johnny Cash at the Tennessee State Prison in 1974. The album features a total of seven performances by Cash with his backing band the Tennessee Three. It also features a total of nine performances by Linda Ronstadt, Roy Clark, and Foster Brooks.

The album is the soundtrack to a television special featuring the concert (Bill Turner, the same narrator from the broadcast, can be heard introducing acts on the album). It was not intended for release as a soundtrack album, but did eventually see release as such in 2003. It was released only 11 days after Cash's death and as such stands as his first posthumous release of previously unreleased performances, though it was not planned as such. A DVD of the broadcast was also released.

A Concert: Behind Prison Walls stands as the fourth and final album of Cash's conceptual series of live albums recorded before an audience of prison inmates. The other three are, chronologically, At Folsom Prison (1968), At San Quentin (1969) and På Österåker (1973).

The original release of the show was called Flowers Out of Place and featured Glen Sherley, who had written several songs that Cash had performed at earlier prison concerts. Sherley's material has been cut from recent releases of the show.

== Track listing ==
Source: Allmusic

| No. | Title | Performer | Length |
|---|---|---|---|
| 1. | "Folsom Prison Blues" | Johnny Cash | 2:03 |
| 2. | "Sunday Mornin' Comin' Down" | Cash | 3:55 |
| 3. | "Jacob Green" | Cash | 3:13 |
| 4. | "Comedy Routine" | Foster Brooks | 4:50 |
| 5. | "Desperado" | Linda Ronstadt | 3:29 |
| 6. | "You're No Good" | Ronstadt | 3:02 |
| 7. | "Rollin My Sweet Baby's Arms" | Roy Clark | 2:29 |
| 8. | "Honeymoon Feelin'" | Clark | 2:42 |
| 9. | "Shuckin' the Corn" | Clark | 2:22 |
| 10. | "Half As Much" | Brooks | 3:39 |
| 11. | "Love Has No Pride" | Ronstadt | 4:16 |
| 12. | "Silver Threads and Golden Needles" | Ronstadt | 2:20 |
| 13. | "Hey Porter" | Cash | 1:15 |
| 14. | "Wreck of the Ol' Ninety-Seven" | Cash | 1:20 |
| 15. | "Orange Blossom Special" | Cash | 3:41 |
| 16. | "A Boy Named Sue" | Cash | 3:11 |

== Personnel ==
- Johnny Cash – vocals, acoustic guitar, harmonica
- Linda Ronstadt – vocals
- Roy Clark – vocals, guitar, banjo
- Foster Brooks – vocals

The Tennessee Three

- Larry McCoy – piano
- Marshall Grant – bass
- WS Holland – drums
- Bob Wootton – electric guitar
- Carl Perkins – electric guitar
- Tommy Williams – fiddle
