= Osteraker =

Osteraker may refer to:

- Österåker Municipality
- Österåker Prison
- På Österåker, a Johnny Cash album recorded at Österåker Prison
