= Old New Orleans =

Old New Orleans may refer to:

- The old parts of New Orleans, Louisiana
- USS YFD-2, a yard floating dock nicknamed Old New Orleans
- Old New Orleans a 1940 short documentary movie with James A. FitzPatrick

== See also ==
- Old New Orleans Rum, a rum producer in Louisiana
- List of songs about New Orleans, including songs with "Old New Orleans" in their titles
