= List of songs about New Orleans =

This is a list of songs set in or about New Orleans, Louisiana.

== 0-9 ==
- "1220 Lyons Street" by Idris Muhammad
- "35th Street Blues" by Jelly Roll Morton
- "912 Greens" by Ramblin' Jack Elliot

== A ==
- "A Little Lovin'" by Neil Sedaka
- "A New Orleans" by Adriano Celentano
- "After The Mardi Gras" by Al Anderson (NRBQ)
- "Ain't No City Like New Orleans" by Earl King
- "Ain't Nothin' Like It (Mad Mad Mardi Gras)" by AJ Loria
- "Alexis" by The James Gang
- "Algiers Bounce" by Bob Wallis Storyville Jazzmen
- "Algiers Stomp" by Mills Blue Rhythm Band
- "Algiers Strut" by Kid Thomas Valentine
- "Alive and Kickin'" by Fats Domino
- "All I Need" by Mat Kearney
- "All On A Mardi Gras Day" by Wild Magnolias
- "Allen Toussaint" by Christopher Marsceill aka Reverend Chris
- "Alone In New Orleans" by Frances Wayne
- "Along The Pontchartrain" by Tony Carey
- "Amos Moses'" by Jerry Reed
- "Annie New Orleans" by Elf
- "Another Murder In New Orleans" by Bobby Rush
- "Apache Rose Peacock" by the Red Hot Chili Peppers
- "Appointment In New Orleans" by Tiziana Ghiglioni
- "Arc of Bar" by Japandroids
- "Astoria Strut" by Jones & Collins Astoria Hot Eight
- "At The Mardi Gras" by Beatrice Lillie
- "At The Mardi Gras" by The Dynamics
- "At The Mardi Gras" by Huey "Piano" Smith & Curley Moore
- "At The Mardi Gras Parade" by Ray Anthony
- "The Avenue" by Cowboy Mouth
- "Axeman's Jazz" by The Rumblestrutters

== B ==
- "BaBu Padee Dupa, A Honky-Tonk Too" by Little Tom Tranker
- "Baby Please (All The Shrimp In New Orleans)" by Keith Sykes
- "Baby, Please Don't Go" performed by Big Joe Williams, Boozoo Chavis, Them
- "Back In Blue Orleans" by Les Hooper
- "Back in My Home Town" by Champion Jack Dupree
- "Back In New Orleans" by Houston Person
- "Back O' Town Blues" by Louis Armstrong
- "Back On Front Street" by Roomful of Blues
- "Back to New Orleans" by Buddy Knox
- "Back to New Orleans" by Laurel Aitken
- "Back to New Orleans" by Old Crow Medicine Show
- "Ballet New Orleans" by Jean-Jacques Debout & Pierre Porte
- "Bamboo Road" by Willy DeVille
- "Barrelhouse Bessie From Basin Street" by Bob Crosby and his Orchestra
- "Basin Street" by Clarence "Frogman" Henry
- "Basin Street Ball" by Harry Roy
- "Basin Street Beat" by Jimmy McPartland
- "Basin Street Blues" by Spencer Williams
- "Basin Street Boogie" by Pete Daily's Chicagoans
- "Basin Street Brass" by Rahmlee
- "Basin Street East" by Pete Rugolo and his Orchestra
- "Basin Street Lover" by J. C. Johnson
- "Basin Street Rumble" by The Jordan Brothers
- "Basin Street Stomp" by Basin Street Six
- "Baton Rouge" by The Nixons
- "Battle At New Orleans" by Jim Weaver & Levy Singers
- "The Battle of New Orleans" by Jimmy Driftwood, made popular by Johnny Horton, 1959
- "The Battle of New Orleans" by Zachary Richard
- "Bayou Lena" by Widespread Panic
- "The Bayou Savings Bank Of New Orleans" by Tony Lee Sybert
- "Bayou St John" by Paul Weston
- "Bayou Teche" by Doug Kershaw
- "Below the Water Line" by Paul Soniat
- "The Big Bass Drum (On A Mardi Gras Day)" by Dr John
- "Big Box Dinny" by The Elders
- "Big Chief" by Earl King
- "Big Easy" by Skull Duggery
- "The Big Easy" by Walter "Wolfman" Washington
- "Big Fat Mama From New Orleans" by Tommy Mosley
- "Big John" by Jimmy Dean
- "The Big Muddy" by Bruce Springsteen
- "Big River" by Johnny Cash
- "Black Water" by The Doobie Brothers
- "Blame It On New Orleans by Mac McAnally
- "Blind Willie McTell" by Bob Dylan
- "Blood Swamp" by Dash Rip Rock
- "Bloodletting" by Concrete Blonde
- "Blue Orleans" by Billie Jo Spears
- "Blue Orleans" by Les Hooper
- "Blues For New Orleans" by Voice Of The Wetlands All-Stars (featuring Cyril Neville)
- "Blues In New Orleans" by Jack Ross
- "Blues Of New Orleans" by Jessie Martin
- "Bob Dylan's New Orleans Rag" by Bob Dylan
- "Boogaloo Mardi Gras" by Bobby Williams Group
- "Boogie Down To New Orleans" by Che & Ray
- "Boogie Woogie Preacher From New Orleans" by Danny Taylor
- "Border of the Quarter" by Leon Redbone
- "Born in Louisiana" by Clarence "Gatemouth" Brown
- "Born in New Orleans" by Paul Soniat
- "Born on the Bayou" by Creedence Clearwater Revival
- "Bourbon Street" by Eddie Schwartz
- "Bourbon Street" by Hurriganes
- "Bourbon Street" by Little River Band
- "Bourbon Street Beat" by Don Ralke
- "Bourbon Street Blues" from Mardi Gras
- "Bourbon Street Cajun" by Jim Olivier
- "Bourbon Street Jump" by Raymond Hill
- "Bourbon Street Parade" by Al Terry
- "Bourbon Street Parade" by Paul Barbarin
- "Bourbon Street Shuffle" by Big Ben Banjo Band
- "Bourbon Street Skank" by Ernest Ranglin
- "Bourbon Street Stroll" by Einstein
- "Bowie Knife" by Frankie Laine
- "Boy from New Orleans" by Louis Armstrong
- "Breakdancer's Reunion" by Self
- "Breathe In, Breathe Out, Move On" by Jimmy Buffett
- "Bring Back Storyville" by Guy Davis
- "Broadway At Basin Street" by Cannonball Adderley
- "Brown Sugar" by The Rolling Stones
- "Buddy Bolden's Blues" by Jelly Roll Morton
- "Burgundy Street" by Acker Bilk
- "Burgundy Street Blues" by George Lewis
- "By the River" by Dirty Deep
- "By Route Of New Orleans" by Ed Bruce

== C ==
- “Calling the Children Home” by Little Feat
- "Cajun Man Gets the Blues" by Tab Benoit
- "Cajun Stripper" by Doug Kershaw
- "Canal Street Blues" by King Oliver
- "Canal Street Parade" by Drifting Cowboys
- "Candyman" by Reverend Gary Davis
- "Canal Street Polka" by Rodgers Brothers Band
- "Cannibal Mardi Gras" by Lorrae Desmond
- "Carnival In New Orleans" by Professor Longhair
- "Carnival Time" by Al "Carnival Time" Johnson
- "Chickee Le Pas" by Dr. John
- "Chloe Dancer" by Mother Love Bone
- "Chop and Change" by The Black Keys
- "Christmas in New Orleans" by Dick Sherman and Joe Van Winkle, popularised by Louis Armstrong
- "Christmas Night 4 A.M. New Orleans" by Flat Duo Jets
- "Chromatic Lee Suite" by Lee Konitz
- "Cindy of New Orleans" by Waylon Jennings
- "City Beneath the Sea" by Harry Connick Jr.
- "City That Care Forgot" by Dr. John
- "Clean Up (After Mardi Gras)" by Charmaine Neville
- "Clementine (From New Orleans)" by Bix Beiderbecke
- "The Comancheros" by Lonnie Donegan
- "Come On Back To New Orleans" by Willie West
- "Come On Down To New Orleans" by Shamarr Allen
- "Come To Mardi Gras" by Ironing Board Sam
- "Come To The Mardi Gras" by Allen Toussaint
- "Come To The Mardi Gras" by Edmundo Ros
- "Congo" by Amel Larrieux
- "Congo Square" by Chuck Perkins
- "Congo Square" by Teena Marie
- "Congo Square" by Wynton Marsalis, Johnny Wiggs, Great White
- "Congo Square Rag" by Corey Harris
- "Conja (New Orleans 1786)" by Beausoleil
- "Count Of Clerkenwell" by Arthur Kay's Originals
- "Country Boy Down in New Orleans" by Doug Kershaw
- "Crackstatic" by Ron Hawkins and the Rusty Nails
- "Crazy Mixed-Up Bourbon Street" by New Orleans Rag Peddlers
- "Crescent Blues (Ad Lib Blues)" by Paul Barbarin
- "Crescent City" by Giorgio Gaslini Quartet
- "Crescent City" by Lucinda Williams
- "Crescent City" by Paul Weston
- "Crescent City" by Zydeco Party Band
- "Crescent City Blues" by Little Brother Montgomery
- "Crescent City Bounce" by Archibald & His Orchestra
- "Crescent City Cry" by New Pulse Jazz Band
- "Crescent City Moon" by Voice Of The Wetlands All-Stars (featuring Cyril Neville)
- "Crescent City Starlights" by Walter "Wolfman" Washington
- "Crescent City Stomp" by Stan Kenton Alumni Band
- "Crescent City, U.S.A." by Tommy Tate

== D ==
- "A Dallas Cowboy and a New Orleans Saint" by The Kendalls
- "Dance Back From the Grave" by Marc Cohn
- "Dance To The Mardi Gras" by Murray Campo and the Jazz Saints
- "(Dance with Me) Tonight at the Mardi Gras" by Irving Berlin
- "Dark Lady" by Cher
- "Dauphin Street Blues" (traditional jazz tune)
- "Decatur Drive" by Chris Barber
- "Decatur Street Blues" by Piano Red
- "Decatur Street Boogie" by Piano Red
- "Decatur Street Tutti" by Jabbo Smith
- "Deep Bayou Blues" by George Lewis
- "Destination New Orleans" by Jimmy Lindsey
- "Devil Take New Orleans" by Bill Wrinn
- "Dirt" by Dash Rip Rock
- "Dirty Martini" by Joe Jackson
- "Dixie Flyer" by Randy Newman
- "Dixieland Rock" by Elvis Presley
- "Do The Fat Tuesday" by Kermit Ruffins
- "Do Watcha Wanna" by Rebirth Brass Band
- "Do You Know What It Means to Miss New Orleans?" by Hoagy Carmichael, Louis Armstrong, Harry Connick Jr. and many others
- "Don't it Just Break Your Heart" by Big Rude Jake
- "(Down at) Papa Joe's" by The Dixie Belles
- "Down at the Twist and Shout" by Mary Chapin Carpenter
- "Down Bourbon Street" by Jimmy McPartland
- "Down in Dear Old New Orleans" by Con Conrad
- "Down in New Orleans by Dr. John from Disney's The Princess and the Frog, 2009
- "Down in New Orleans" by Fabulous Little Joe
- "Down in New Orleans" by George "Harmonica" Smith
- "Down in New Orleans" by Steppenwolf
- "Down in New Orleans" by The Vibrations
- "Down in Old New Orleans" by Mickey Jupp
- "Down In Storyville" by Rahmlee
- "Down in the Quarter" by Paul Soniat
- "Down On Second Street" by Zachary Richard
- "Down on the Border" by Little River Band
- "Down South in New Orleans" by Doug Kershaw, The Band
- "Down The Dustpipe" by Status Quo (band)
- "Down to New Orleans" by Vince Gill
- "Drop Me Off In New Orleans" by Kermit Ruffins
- "Dumaine Street Blues" by Glen David Andrews

Dreamers Ball Live Queen

== E ==
- "Esplanade At Sunset" by Paul Weston
- "Every Dog Has Its Day" by Willy DeVille
- "Every Mother's Son" by Humble Pie
- "Everybody's Rockin" by Neil Young
- "Exhibit A" by Jay Electronica
- "Ex's and Oh's" by Elle King

== F ==
- "Fancy" by Bobbie Gentry; Reba McEntire
- "Farewell to Storyville" by Billie Holiday and Louis Armstrong
- "Fat Tuesday" by Allen Toussaint
- "Fat Tuesday" by Grant-Lyttelton Paseo Jazz Band (featuring Humphrey Lyttelton)
- "Feels Like Rain" by John Hiatt
- "Ferryboat To Algiers" by Paul Weston
- "Fishwater" by Widespread Panic
- "Frankie and Johnny" version by Champion Jack Dupree
- "Franklin Street Blues" by Bunk Johnson
- "French Quarter" by Delta Spirit
- "French Quarter" by Madcap
- "French Quarter Faggot" by Quintron
- "French Quarter Strut" by James Taylor's 4th Dimension (featuring James Taylor of the James Taylor Quartet)
- "Frenchmen Street Stomp" by Christopher Marsceill aka Reverend Chris
- "From Baton Rouge To New Orleans" by Beelow

== G ==
- "Gal From New Orleans" by Knightsbridge Orchestra
- "The Ghost Of Highway 61" by Mighty Mo Rodgers
- "Girl Down In New Orleans" by Floyd Dixon
- "Girl in New Orleans" by Sammi Smith
- "Give 'Em Hell Kid" by My Chemical Romance
- "Go Back to your Woods" by Robbie Robertson
- "Go Down To New Orleans" by Lillian Boutté
- "Go To New Orleans" by New Orleans Red Beans (featuring Paul Barbarin)
- "Go to the Mardi Gras" by Professor Longhair
- "God-Forsaken Town" by Reckless Kelly
- "Goin' Back to Louisiana" by Delbert McClinton
- "Goin' Down To New Orleans" by Bluebird
- "Goin' Home" by Ken Colyer
- "Goin' to Louisiana" by John Lee Hooker
- "Goin' To Nawlins" by Zydeco Party Band
- "Goin' To New Orleans" by Eddie "Guitar" Burns with Jimmy Burns
- "Goin' To New Orleans" by Buddy Skipper And The Code Blues Band
- "Going Back to New Orleans" by Artie Malvin
- "Going Back to New Orleans" by Hugh Masekela
- "Going Back to New Orleans" performed by Joe Liggins and the Honeydrippers, Deacon John Moore
- "Going Back To New Orleans" by Leon Haywood
- "Going Back To New Orleans" by Mason Jennings
- "Going To New Orleans" by Charlie Smith Blues Band
- "Gold Guitar" by Bill Anderson
- "Gold In New Orleans" by Left Side
- "(Gon' Be Dat) New Orleans Music" by Batiste Brothers (featuring Russell Batiste Jr.)
- "Good Morning New Orleans" by Kermit Ruffins
- "Goodbye Bourbon Street" by The Bishops
- "Goodbye New Orleans" by Pee Wee King & Redd Stewart
- "Goodbye NOLA" by Winston Hall and Donna Chance
- "Gradle" by Widespread Panic
- "Gris-gris" by Andrew Bird
- "Gravier Street Blues" by Johnny Dodds & Jimmie Noone

== H ==
- "Hate to Feel" by Alice in Chains
- "Havan (By Way Of New Orleans & Hackney)" by MFOS (aka Snowboy)
- "Heart of New Orleans" by John Hemmings
- "Heart of the Night" by Poco
- "Hello My Lover" by Willy DeVille
- "Hello New Orleans" by Robert Earl Keen
- "Help Is on the Way" by Rise Against, 2011 ("The Crescent City sleeps...")
- "Her First Mistake" by Lyle Lovett
- "Hey, Mardi Gras! (Here I Am)" by Chuck Carbo
- "Highway 61" by Tommy McClennan
- "Home" by Marc Broussard, 2005
- "Home In New Orleans" by Pamela Miller
- "Home To New Orleans" by Queen Ida & the Bon Temps Zydeco Band
- "Honky Cat" by Elton John
- "A House In New Orleans" by Ed Bruce
- "The House of the Rising Sun," American folk song, made popular by The Animals, 1964, (#1 on Billboard Hot 100)
- "Houston" by Mary Chapin Carpenter
- "Hurricane" by Levon Helm

== I ==
- "I Am A New Orleans' Genevieve" by Samsun
- "I Didn't Find A Saint (In New Orleans)" by Country Bill White & Dawn Glass
- "I Got A Treme Woman" by Kermit Ruffins
- "I Hope You're Comin' Back to New Orleans" by New Orleans Jazz Vipers
- "I Just Can't Get (New Orleans Off My Mind)" by Fats Domino
- "I Know What It Means To Miss New Orleans" by Vince Vance and the Valiants
- "I Know You Mardi Gras" by Wild Magnolias
- "I Love Louisiana" by Rosie Ledet
- "I Love New Orleans" by Ronnie Milsap
- "I Love To Wake Up In New Orleans" by Larry John McNally
- "I Love You Goodbye" by Thomas Dolby
- "I Might Be Awhile In New Orleans" by Johnny Russell
- "I Thought I Heard New Orleans Say" by Dr. John
- "I Wanna Be the Big Chief" by Christopher Marsceill aka Reverend Chris
- "I Wanna Die in New Orleans" by DiNOLA
- "I Went To The Mardi Gras" by Snooks Eaglin
- "I Wish I Was in New Orleans" by Tom Waits
- "I'd Rather Be In New Orleans" by The Flying Neutrinos
- "If I Were Brave" by Shawn Colvin
- "If New Orleans Is Beat" by The Tragically Hip
- "Iko Iko" by The Dixie Cups, 1965
- "I'm Cousin Joe From New Orleans" by Cousin Joe
- "I'm Going Back To Louisiana" Bruce Channel
- "I'm Going To New Orleans" by Charles Mann
- "I'm Saving Up The Means To Get To New Orleans" by Al Jolson
- "I'm So New Orleans" by Kermit Ruffins
- "In The Clear" by Foo Fighters
- "In Color" by Jamey Johnson
- "In Good Old New Orleans" by Murphy Campo And The Jazz Saints
- "In New Orleans" by Lead Belly
- "In The Old French Quarter Of New Orleans by Maxine Daniels
- "Indian Red", traditional, first recorded by Danny Barker
- "The Irish Went Down To New Orleans" by Charlie Spaniels Band
- "It's A New Orleans Thing" by Allen Toussaint
- "It's Christmas In Nu Awlins" by Gary U.S. Bonds
- "It's Mardi Gras" by Desire
- "I've Got the Blues for Rampart Street" (jazz tune)

== J ==
- "Jackson Square" by Mason Jennings
- "Jambalaya" by Hank Williams
- "Jambalaya" by Van Morrison & Linda Gail Lew
- "Jammin' To New Orleans" by Risky Business
- "Jazz At Lu Charlie's" by Giorgio Gaslini Quartet
- "Jazz Music" by Gang Starr (this is a different song than the more famous "Jazz Thing")
- "Jazz Thing" by Gang Starr
- "Jazzfest" by Paul Soniat
- "Je T'Aime N'Orleans" by Big Boy Pete (aka as Peter Miller (musician))
- "Jesus in New Orleans" by Over the Rhine
- "Jock-a-mo" by Sugar Boy Crawford
- "John Lennon In New Orleans" by Colin Linden
- "Johnny B. Goode" by Chuck Berry
- "Jolie Blon" by Zachary Richard
- "Jump City" by Willy DeVille
- "Just Off Decatur Street" by Willy DeVille
- "Just Outside New Orleans" by Earl Stanley & The Stereos

== K ==
- "Key to My Heart" by Willy DeVille
- "King Creole" by Elvis Presley from the film, 1958
- "King of New Orleans" by Better Than Ezra from Friction, Baby, 1996 (#5 on Modern Rock Tracks Chart)
- "King of the Zulus" by Louis Armstrong
- "King Zulu Parade" by Johnny Wiggs
- "Kingfish" by Randy Newman
- "Knives of New Orleans" by Eric Church, 2015
- "King of the Mardi Gras" by Charmaine Neville

== L ==
- "La Chanson De Les Mardi Gras: by Dewey Balfa & The Balfa Brothers
- "La Chanson De Mardi Gras" by Anúna
- "La Chanson De Mardi Gras" by BeauSoleil
- "La Chanson Des Mardi Gras" by Zachary Richard
- "La Danse De Mardi Gras" (traditional Cajun tune)
- "La Harpe Street Blues" by Climax Jazz Band
- "La La" by Lil Wayne from Tha Carter III, 2008
- "Lady Marmalade" by Labelle, 1974
- "Lady Marmalade" by All Saints, 2000
- "Lady Marmalade" by Christina Aguilera, P!nk, Lil' Kim & Mya (singer), 2001
- "Lady Marmalade" by Deborah Cox, Shanice, Chanté Moore & Kelly Price, 2021
- "Lakes Of Pontchartrain"
- "Lakeshore Drive At Milneburg" by Doc Evans With Armand Hug Trio
- "Land Grab" by Dr. John
- "Land Long Gone" by Paul Soniat
- "Last Train To New Orleans" by the Sugar Lumps
- "The Last Waltz" by Bobby Charles
- "Leaving New Orleans" by Jordan Davis (singer)
- "The Legend of the Last of the Outlaw Truckers" by The Dandy Warhols
- "Les Mardi Gras (Riders In The Sky)" by Stan Jones (songwriter)
- "Les Rois de Bourbon Street" by Patrick Norman (singer)
- "Let's Impeach the President" by Neil Young
- "Let's Take A Ferryboat To New Orleans" by Louis Cottrell And His New Orleans Jazz Band
- "Letter From New Orleans" by Raymond Froggatt
- "The Levees Broke (Katrina)" by Jay Electronica
- "Like a Real Cajun" by Michael Doucet
- "Limbo" by Bryan Ferry
- "Little Jewel Of The Vieux Carre" by Joe Barry (singer)
- "Lonely Girl on Bourbon Street" by Mazarati
- "Lonely Mardi Gras" by Michael Hurtt And His Haunted Hearts
- "Lonesome, On'ry and Mean" written by Steve Young, performed by Waylon Jennings
- "Long Live New Orleans" by Reuben Wilson, Bernard Purdie, Grant Green Jr.
- "Long Way Back From Hell" by Danzig
- "Look For Me In New Orleans" by Tommy McCoy
- "Look Where We Have Been" by Christopher Marsceill aka Reverend Chris
- "Louisiana 1927" written by Randy Newman, performed by Aaron Neville and Marcia Ball
- "Louisiana Blue" by Radney Foster
- "Louisiana Bound" by Big Joe Williams
- "Louisiana Love Call" by Maria Muldaur
- "Louisiana Love Shack" by Pat Boyack
- "Louisiana Lover Man" by Lonesome Sundown
- "Louisiana Man" by Doug Kershaw, Tab Benoit
- "Louisiana Rain" by Anders Osborne
- "Louisiana Santa" by Wayne Toups
- "Louisiana Style" by Tab Benoit
- "Louisiana Suite" by Tom Talbert Orchestra
- "Louisiana Sunday Afternoon" by Diane Schuur
- "Louisiana Sunshine" by Cyril Neville and Tab Benoit
- "Louisiana Woman" by Bryan Lee
- "Louisiana Zydeco" by Clarence "Gatemouth" Brown
- "Love in the Hot Afternoon" by Gene Watson
- "Love in New Orleans" by Los Rabanes
- "Love New Orleans" by Idris Muhammad
- "Loves Of New Orleans", from Naughty Marietta
- "Loving You Has Made Me Bananas" by Guy Marks
- "Lucky" by Seven Mary Three

== M ==
- "Magnolia Soul" by Ozomatli
- "Magnolia Street Parade" by Bob Crosby
- "Mahogany Hall Stomp" by Louis Armstrong
- "Man From New Orleans" by Swampwater
- "Maple Leaf Strutt" by Joe Krown, Walter "Wolfman" Washington, Russell Batiste Jr.
- "Mardi Gras" by Dave "Baby" Cortez
- "Mardi Gras" by David Whitfield
- "Mardi Gras" by Doug Kershaw
- "Mardi Gras" by Flambeaux
- "Mardi Gras" by Gino Vannelli
- "Mardi Gras" by Hugh Martin
- "Mardi Gras" by Ike Quebec
- "Mardi Gras" by Jeff Kashiwa
- "Mardi Gras" by Jessie Hill
- "Mardi Gras" by John Klemmer
- "Mardi Gras", from Mardi Gras (1958 film)
- "Mardi Gras" by Pat Martino
- "Mardi Gras" by Scream
- "Mardi Gras" by Spyro Gyra
- "The Mardi Gras" by Victor Herbert
- "Mardi Gras" by Victor Silvester
- "Mardi Gras And Rosetta Roses" by Casablanca
- "Mardi Gras At Midnight" by A Tribe Called Quest
- "Mardi Gras Beads" by Parquet Courts
- "Mardi Gras (Breeze From The River)" by Howard Blaikley
- "Mardi Gras Carnival" by Margie Perez
- "Mardi Gras Cha" by Rico Henderson and his Orchestra
- "Mardi Gras Day" by Manfred Mann's Earth Band
- "Mardi Gras, Down In New Orleans It's Carnival (Mardi Gras Rap)" by The Jones & Taylor Experience
- "Mardi Gras Gumbo" by Kenny 'Blue' Ray
- "Mardi Gras in New Orleans" by Earl King
- "Mardi Gras in New Orleans" by Professor Longhair
- "Mardi Gras In The City" by Earl King
- "Mardi Gras (Indian Dance)" by Paul Weston
- "Mardi Gras Jig" by Dewey Balfa, Tony Balfa, Tracy Schwarz, Peter Schwarz (Tracy Schwarz of Ginny Hawker and Tracy Schwarz)
- "Mardi Gras Madness" by Barney Bigard
- "Mardi Gras Mambo" by The Hawketts
- "Mardi Gras Mambo" by The Meters
- "The Mardi Gras March" by Louis Armstrong
- "Mardi Gras Parade" by Jerry Colonna
- "Mardi Gras Parade" by New Orleans Creole Jazz Band featuring Thomas Jefferson (musician)
- "Mardi Gras Party" by Carl Marshall
- "Mardi Gras Rag" by Wilbur De Paris
- "Mardi Gras Rock" by Bobby Freeman
- "Mardi Gras Second Line" by Rockin' Sidney
- "Mardi Gras Song" by John Delafose
- "Mardi Gras Strut" by Al Johnson
- "Mardi Gras Time" by Bayou Renegades
- "Mardi Gras Time" by Timmy Dusenbery
- "Mardi Gras Twist" by Doris Matte
- "The Mardi Gras Walking Club" by Pete Fountain
- "Mardi Gras Waltz" by Carmen Lombardo and John Jacob Loeb
- "Mardi Gras Waltz" by Joe Ely
- "Mardi Gras Zydeco" by Rockin' Sidney
- "Marie Laveau" by Bobby Bare
- "Matinee Hour In New Orleans" by Three Clouds
- "Me and Bobby McGee" by Janis Joplin
- "Meet the Boys (on the Battlefront)" by The Wild Tchoupitoulas
- "Meet Me On Frenchmen Street" by Shamarr Allen
- "Meet Me On The Levee" by Chris Barber
- "The Mess Inside" by The Mountain Goats
- "A Message To Martha" Adam Faith
- "Message to Michael" by Dionne Warwick
- "Mid-City Baby" by The New Orleans Bingo! Show
- "Midnight In New Orleans" by Earl Hines
- "Milenberg Joys" by Jelly Roll Morton
- "Mississippi Pearl" by The Stray Birds
- "Monday Night In New Orleans" by Kermit Ruffins
- "Moon over Bourbon Street" by Sting
- "Move It" by Cliff Richard with Brian May & Brian Bennett
- "Move to Louisiana" by John Mooney
- "Mr. Bojangles" by Jerry Jeff Walker, made popular by The Nitty Gritty Dirt Band
- "Mr. Mardi Gras" by Allen Toussaint
- "Mr. Tambourine Man" by Bob Dylan
- "Mrs. Orleans" by Trombone Shorty ft. Kid Rock, from For True, 2011
- "Muk Tuk Mardi Gras Two Step" by Frankie Rodgers & the Rodgers Brothers
- "Murder In New Orleans" by Voice Of The Wetlands All-Stars (featuring Cyril Neville)
- "My Blue Ridge Mountain Boy" by Dolly Parton
- "My Darlin' New Orleans" by L'il Queenie
- "My Father's Gun" by Elton John
- "My Hometown New Orleans" by Paul Soniat
- "My Little Old Home Down In New Orleans" by Frank Luther
- "My New Orleans" by Al Fats Edwards
- "My NOLA" by Harry Connick, Jr.
- "My People Need A Second Line" by Dr. John
- "My Sanctuary" by Marc Cohn

== N ==
- "N.O. Blues" by Stan Tracey
- "N.O.L.A. My Home" by Willie West
- "N.O. Stylee" by Skull Duggery
- "N.O.T. Aka N’Awlins Thang" by Raphael Wressnig's Organic Trio
- "N'Awlin Nights" by Kim Mitchell
- "N'awlins" by The Zawinul Syndicate
- "N'awlins" by Bobby Stagg
- "The New Battle of New Orleans" by Ray Stevens
- "New Highway 51" by Tommy McClennan
- "New Mardi Gras Dance" by Aldus Roger and the Lafayette Playboys
- "New Orleans" by Al Prince
- "New Orleans" by Beautiful Creatures
- "New Orleans" by Bill Pritchard
- "NEW ORLEANS" by Brockhampton (band)
- "New Orleans" by Cash McCall
- "New Orleans" by Cowboy Mouth
- "New Orleans" by Curtis Mayfield
- "New Orleans" by David Hess
- "New Orleans" by Elvis Presley
- "New Orleans" by Emerson, Lake & Palmer
- "New Orleans" by The Essex Green
- "New Orleans" by Gary U.S. Bonds, The Grateful Dead, The Radiators, The Blues Brothers, The Stampeders, Joan Jett and the Blackhearts, Neil Diamond, Hank Williams Jr., and others
- "New Orleans" by Georgia Anne Muldrow
- "New Orleans" by Henry Creamer and Turner Layton
- "New Orleans" by Hoagy Carmichael
- "New Orleans" by Howard Blaikley
- "New Orleans" by Husky
- "New Orleans" by Idris Muhammad
- "New Orleans" (from Is Everybody Happy? (1929 film))
- "New Orleans" by John Stewart
- "New Orleans" by Kid Rock
- "New Orleans" by King Curtis
- "New Orleans" by Les Humphries
- "New Orleans" by Mamie Smith
- "New Orleans" by The New Orleans Bingo! Show
- "New Orleans" by Nicky Henson & Dana Gillespie
- "New Orleans" by Parachute
- "New Orleans" by Paris
- "New Orleans" by The Pazant Brothers and the Beaufort Express
- "New Orleans" by Peshay
- "New Orleans" by Rancid
- "New Orleans" by Sarah McCoy
- "New Orleans" by St Joe Run
- "New Orleans" by Silver Jews
- "New Orleans" by Stevie Nicks
- "New Orleans" by Toby Keith
- "New Orleans" by Trampled by Turtles
- "New Orleans" by Truckers
- "New Orleans" by Your Heart Breaks
- "New Orleans 2am" by The Khans
- "New Orleans And A Rusty Old Horn" by Sonny Knight
- "New Orleans Ain't The Same" by Fats Domino
- "New Orleans Beat" by The Cannonballs
- "New Orleans Beat" by Jimmy McCracklin
- "New Orleans Beat" by Steve Riley
- "New Orleans Biguine" by Pierre Dalmon
- "New Orleans Blue" by Jerry Foster
- "New Orleans Blues" by Blue Lu Barker
- "New Orleans Blues" by Jelly Roll Morton
- "New Orleans Blues" by Johnny De Droit and the New Orleans Jazz Orchestra
- "New Orleans Blues" by Willie Mabon
- "New Orleans Bump" by Jelly Roll Morton and later by Wynton Marsalis
- "New Orleans Calling" by Newark Boys Chorus, Rutgers Jazz Ensemble
- "New Orleans Cannon Ball" by George Garabedian Players
- "New Orleans Cha-Cha" by Jerry Colonna
- "The New Orleans Connection" by Michael "Bami" Rose
- "New Orleans Cookin'" by Cyril Neville
- "New Orleans Drag" by Sammy Price and his Rompin' Stompers
- "New Orleans Forever" from Jérôme Savary's 'Looking for Josephine'
- "New Orleans Function" by Louis Armstrong
- "New Orleans Funeral" by Hazy Osterwald
- "New Orleans Girl" by Winston Hall and Donna Chance
- "New Orleans Gumbo" by Idris Muhammad
- "New Orleans (The Home Of The Bluzz)" by Eddie Zip And Fast Company
- "New Orleans Hop" by Monte Easter
- "New Orleans Hop Scop Blues" by Richard M. Jones
- "New Orleans Hula" by George Lewis
- "New Orleans In The Rain" by Johnny Williams
- "New Orleans Is a Dying Whore" by Down
- "New Orleans Is A Mighty Good Town" by Eddy Raven
- "New Orleans Is Coming Back" David Batiste & The Gladiators
- "New Orleans Is My Home" by The Jingle Janglers
- "New Orleans Is Sinking" by The Tragically Hip
- "New Orleans is the New Vietnam" by Eyehategod
- "New Orleans Jail" by Rod Bernard
- "New Orleans Jeunesse Dorèe" from Naughty Marietta
- "New Orleans Joys" by Lu Watters and the Yerba Buena Jazz Band
- "New Orleans Ladies" by Le Roux
- "New Orleans Lady" by James Rivers
- "New Orleans, Louisiana" by Dr. John and Chris Barber
- "New Orleans Low Down" by Duke Ellington
- "New Orleans Mambo" by James Rivers Quartet
- "New Orleans (Mardi Gras)" by Southwind
- "New Orleans Moan" by Roselyn Lionhart (of duo David and Roselyn)
- "New Orleans Music" by Rebirth Brass Band
- "New Orleans Music" by Tony Wilson (a member of Hot Chocolate)
- "New Orleans (My Home Town)" by Kermit Ruffins
- "New Orleans, New Orleans" by Bintangs
- "New Orleans Parade" by Chris Barber
- "New Orleans Poon" (from Prettybelle)
- "New Orleans Post Parade" by Scatman Crothers
- "New Orleans Presidential Shit" by Lil Wayne
- "New Orleans Rag" by Willie 'The Rock' Knox
- "New Orleans Rain" by Zakiya Hooker
- "New Orleans, RIP" by Meriwether
- "New Orleans Rock" by The 5.6.7.8's
- "New Orleans Second Line" by Olympia Brass Band
- "New Orleans Shuffle" by Johnny Otis
- "New Orleans Song" by La Croix
- "New Orleans Stomp" by Louis Armstrong
- "New Orleans Street March" by Chris Farlowe, Brian Auger and Pete York
- "New Orleans Strut" by Cannonball Adderley
- "A New Orleans Suite" by Sheba Sound
- "New Orleans Twist" by Blazer Boy
- "New Orleans When It Rains" by Razzy Bailey
- "New Orleans Wiggle" by Piron's New Orleans Orchestra
- "New Orleans Wins the War" by Randy Newman
- "New Orleans Woman" by Dirty Blues Band (a band formed by Rod Piazza)
- "New Orleans Woman" by Dorsey Burnette
- "New Orleans Woman" by Elmer Tippe
- "New York To New Orleans" by Pee Wee King & His Golden West Cowboys
- "Night Train to New Orleans" by Wayne Toups
- "Ninth Ward Blues" by King James & The Special Men
- "Ninth Ward Swing" by William Clarke And The NightOwls
- "No City Like New Orleans" by Earl King
- "Nola" by Dayna Kurtz
- "Norleans" by Lonnie Smith
- "North Rampart Street March (On Parade)" by Sharkey Bonano
- "Nouvelle-Orléans" by La Femme

== O ==
- "Oh Louisiana" by Wayne Toups
- "Oh New Orleans" by Peter Parker's Rock 'n' Roll Club
- "Oh My NOLA" by Harry Connick Jr.
- "Old Bridge" by Dash Rip Rock
- "Old New Orleans Rhythm And Blues" by Mike Young & Ricky Kelly
- "One Block Back Of Basin Street" by Dolph Hewitt
- "One More Murder" by Better Than Ezra from How Does Your Garden Grow?, 1998
- "One Night In New Orleans" by Blackhawk
- "Orleans" by The Standstills
- "Orleans Parish Prison" by Dick Feller
- "Orleans Party" by Ironing Board Sam

== P ==
- "Papa De-Da-Da (A New Orleans Stomp)" by Clarence Williams
- "Pearl of the Quarter" by Steely Dan
- "Peel" by Seven Mary Three
- "Perdido" by Duke Ellington
- "Perdido Street" by Herbert Hardesty and the Rhythm Rollers
- "Perdido Street Blues" by Louis Armstrong
- "Perdido Street Stomp" by Sidney Bechet
- "Planet of New Orleans" by Dire Straits
- "Pontchartrain Blues" by Jelly Roll Morton
- "Promised Land" by Chuck Berry
- "Proud Mary" by Creedence Clearwater Revival
- "Prytania" by Mutemath 2011, from Odd Soul

== Q ==
- "Quarter Rat" by Christopher Marsceill aka Reverend Chris
- "Queen of New Orleans" by Earl Thomas Conley
- "Queen of New Orleans" by Jon Bon Jovi
- "Queen of the Mardi Gras" by Marty Wyte
- "Queen of the Mardi Gras" by Tony Christie

== R ==
- "Rainin' In New Orleans" by Lonesome Romeos
- "Rainin' Pain Down in New Orleans" by Warren Haynes
- "Ramblin', Gamblin' Willie" by Bob Dylan
- "Ramblin Man" by Allman Brothers
- "Rampart Street Blues" by Cotton Pickers
- "Red Beans" by Henry Roeland Byrd aka Professor Longhair
- "Red Boy At The Mardi Gras" by Todd Rhodes Orchestra
- "Red Eye" by Paul Soniat
- "Red Rain" by Paris
- "Relaxin' at the Touro" by Muggsy Spanier
- "Remember Me To New Orleans" by Alice Creech
- "Rendesvous In Congo Square" by Jackie McLean
- "Reuben and Cherise" by Jerry Garcia Band
- "Rich Bitch from the Garden District" by Paul Soniat
- "Right Around The Corner From Basin Street" by Maxwell Davis Orchestra
- "The River in Reverse" by Elvis Costello & Allen Toussaint
- "Riverboat Fantasy" by David Wilcox
- "Rock Island Line" by Johnny Cash
- "Roll On Tulane (The Olive And Blue)" by Johnny Long (musician) and his Orchestra
- "Roseland Waltz" by Willis Prudhomme & Zydeco Express
- "Royal Orleans" by Led Zeppelin
- "Royal Street" by Jim Helms, Gary LeMel, Norma Green
- "Royal Street" by Raul Reynoso
- "Royal Street" by Thomas Talbert Jazz Orchestra
- "Royal Street Flush" by Band Of Pleasure (features James Gadson)
- "Rubin and Cherise" by Jerry Garcia
- "Rudee Down In New Orleans" by Blaze Foley
- "Rumpus on Rampart Street" by Edmond Hall
- "Running To New Orleans" by Byther Smith

== S ==
- "Sadie Green Vamp Of New Orleans" by Five Harmonicas
- "Sailing to New Orleans" by Victor Johnson
- "St. James Infirmary Blues" recorded by numerous musicians
- "Saint Of New Orleans" by PJ Parks
- "St. Patricks Day In New Orleans" by Alias Ron Kavana
- "St. Phillips St. Breakdown" by George Lewis
- "The Saints are Coming" by U2 and Green Day, 2006 (#2 on UK Singles Chart)
- "Saturday Night Fish Fry" by Louis Jordan
- "Save my Soul" by Big Bad Voodoo Daddy
- "Say, Has Anybody Seen My Sweet Gypsy Rose" by Tony Orlando and Dawn
- "Say Whut?" by Dr. John
- "See You All in Hell or New Orleans" by Dax Riggs
- "Serpentflame" by Calabrese
- "Shake That Monkey" by Too Short
- "Shake Your Tambourine" by The Neville Brothers
- "She Darked the Sun" by Dillard & Clark
- "She Took Me To The Mardi Gras" by Tony Christie
- "She's My Man" by Scissor Sisters
- "Shreveport Stomp" by Jelly Roll Morton
- "Shreveport to New Orleans" by Roger Creager
- "(Si Si) Je Suis Un Rock Star" by Bill Wyman
- "Sin City Blues" by Merle Haggard
- "Smokey Bourbon Street" by Bill Black's Combo
- "Snooky & Andy At The Mardi Gras" by Snooky Pryor
- "Something Like That" by Tim McGraw 1999
- "Song of New Orleans" instrumental by Jerry Capehart with Eddie Cochran
- "Song of New Orleans" by Sunny Skylar
- "Song of New Orleans" by Johnny Wiggs
- "South In New Orleans" by Hungry Chuck
- "South Rampart Street Parade" (jazz standard)
- "Southern Sun" by Paul Oakenfold
- "Speed King" by Deep Purple
- "Spirit Of New Orleans" by Hans Olson
- "Standing Outside a Broken Phone Booth With Money in My Hand" by Primitive Radio Gods
- "State Street Blues" by Cotton Pickers
- "Steppin' Out Under the Moon" by Big Rude Jake
- "Stoned In New Orleans" by Magic
- "Storyville" by Don Ellis
- "Storyville" by Paul Weston
- "Storyville" by Tony Carey
- "Storyville Blues" by Chris Barber
- "Storyville Story" by Gerry Mulligan
- "Stringbeans at Rock N' Bowl" by Rosie Ledet
- "Stripped Away" by Dr. John
- "Stuck in New Orleans" by Tommy McLain
- "Summertime in New Orleans" by Anders Osborne
- "Sun Down In New Orleans" by Jimmy McPartland
- "Sunny New Orleans" by Skip Prokop
- "Sunset On Louisianne" by Zachary Richard
- "Sweet Home New Orleans" by Dr. John
- "Sweet Talkin' Man" by Lynn Anderson
- "Swinging At The Haven" by Ellis Marsalis Jr. Quartet
- "Swinging Down In New Orleans" by Doc Cheatham

== T ==
- "Take a Ride On A Riverboat" by Le Roux
- "Take Me Back Down To New Orleans" by Gator Beat
- "Take Me Back To New Orleans" by Chris Barber
- "Take me Back To New Orleans" by Gary U.S. Bonds, Cowboy Mouth
- "Take Me Down To New Orleans" by Ray Cyr and the Mardigras
- "Take Me To The Mardi Gras" by Paul Simon, Bob James
- "Talkin' Bout New Orleans" by The Meters
- "Tall Lean Girl From New Orleans" by Jody Levins
- "Tangled Up in Blue" by Bob Dylan
- "Tango Till They're Sore" by Tom Waits
- "Tchoupitoulas Congregation" by the Cherry Poppin' Daddies
- "Tchoupitoulas Road" by Joe Barry (singer)
- "Teasing You" by Earl King
- "Tell Your Sister" by Lloyd Cole
- "The Teens In Jeans From New Orleans" by Lillian Briggs
- "That's Enough of That Stuff" by Marcia Ball
- "There is a Light" by Clint Maedgen of The New Orleans Bingo! Show
- "They All Asked for You" written by Nocentelli, Neville, Porter, and Modeliste and performed by The Meters
- "Thibodeaux, Louisiana" by Marcia Ball
- "Third Street Blues" by Jimmy McPartland
- "This City" by Steve Earle
- "This River Flows To New Orleans" by Tommy Reilly
- "Tin Roof Blues" by the New Orleans Rhythm Kings
- "To New Orleans" by Harry Chalkitis
- "Toast Of New Orleans" by Ronnie Hughes
- "Toulouse Street" by The Doobie Brothers
- "A Town Called New Orleans" by Jimmy Dean
- "Treme Mardi Gras" by Kermit Ruffins
- "Treme Second Line (Blow da Whistle)" by Kermit Ruffins
- "Treme Song" by John Boutte
- "Trip To New Orleans" by The Bees
- "Trouble In New Orleans" by X. Lincoln
- "Tryin' To Get To Heaven" by Bob Dylan
- "Truckin'" by the Grateful Dead
- "Tugboats" by Dash Rip Rock

== U ==
- "Up From New Orleans" by Yellowjackets

== V ==
- "The Valleys of New Orleans" by The Veils
- "The Vampire Song" by Concrete Blonde
- "Viens Danser Le Hully-Gully (New Orleans)" by Sheila (singer)
- "Vieux Carre" by Paul Weston
- "Voodoo Charm" by Willy DeVille
- "Voodoo City" by Black 47

== W ==
- "Washboard Lisa" by Grayson Capps
- "Walk On" by John Hiatt
- "Walking Through New Orleans" by Pete Fountain
- "Walkin' Thru New Orleans" by Rusty Wier
- "Walking to New Orleans" by Fats Domino, Clifton Chenier
- "Way Down Yonder In New Orleans" by Freddy Cannon, Henry Creamer
- "Way Up Yonder In New Orleans" by Alex McMurray
- "We Gettin' There" by Dr. John
- "We Make Good Gumbo" by Tab Benoit
- "West End Blues" (jazz standard)
- "West Lawn Dirge" by Eureka Brass Band
- "What Am I Doin' In Kansas City (When You're In New Orleans)" by Guy Mitchell
- "What Is New Orleans" by Kermit Ruffins
- "Wheel Inside A Wheel" by Jimmy Buffett
- "When A St. Louis Woman Comes Down To New Orleans Blues" from Belle of the Nineties
- "When She's Gone, She's Gone by Brooks and Dunn
- "When The Levee Breaks" by Galactic
- "When The Saints Go Marching In" recorded by numerous musicians, and by Louis Armstrong in 1938
- "When We Dance At The Mardi Gras" by Doc Evans And His Dixieland Band
- "Where The Blues Were Born In New Orleans" by Louis Armstrong
- "Where Were You" by Jackson Browne
- "While We Danced At The Mardi Gras" by Pete Fountain
- "Who Dat" by Ween
- "The Witch Queen of New Orleans" by Redbone

== Y ==
- "Year Down In New Orleans" by Nanci Griffith
- "Yes I Love Her (New Orleans)" by Ronni Kole
- "You Never Can Tell" by Chuck Berry
- "Your Boots In New Orleans" by Salon Music
- "You've Got to be Crazy to Live in This Town" by Alex McMurray

== Z ==
- "Zydeco Mardis Gras" by Boozoo Chavis
