= Orleans Parish Prison (song) =

Song by Johnny Cash

Single by Johnny Cash

from the album Johnny Cash på Österåker
- A-side: "Orleans Parish Prison" "Jacob Green"
- Released: January 11, 1974
- Genre: Country
- Label: Columbia 4-45997
- Songwriter: Dick Feller
- Producers: Johnny Cash, Charlie Bragg

Johnny Cash singles chronology
"Pick the Wildwood Flower" (1973)	"Orleans Parish Prison" (1974)	"Ragged Old Flag" (1974)

Audio
- "Orleans Parish Prison" on YouTube

"Orleans Parish Prison" was written by songwriter Dick Feller and originally appeared on Feller's 1973 album Dick Feller Wrote....

It was performed by Johnny Cash at his concert held at the Swedish Österåker Prison on October 3, 1972, and included on his live album Johnny Cash på Österåker, recorded during that concert and released on Columbia Records in 1974.

In the song, the singer asks the listeners if they had seen his "dark-haired girl", his "green-eyed son" and his brother — since all three are currently being interned in the Orleans Parish Prison.

Cash liked the song and released it as a single.

Released on January 11, 1974, the single (Columbia 4-45997, with "Jacob Green" on the opposite side), reached number 52 on U.S. Billboard's country chart.

The version that was released as a single has altered lyrics: on the album the dark-haired girl "took [money] from a whorin' world", while on the single it is a "hungry world".

== Track listing ==
7" single (Columbia 4-45997, 1974)
No.	Title	Writer(s)	Length
1.	"Orleans Parish Prison"	D. Feller	2:27
2.	"Jacob Green"	J. Cash	3:00

== Charts ==
Chart (1974)	Peak position
US Hot Country Songs (Billboard)	52
