= At San Quentin =

Live album by Johnny Cash
- Released: June 16, 1969
- Recorded: February 24, 1969
- Venue: San Quentin State Prison, California
- Genre: Country; rock and roll
- Length: 34:04
- Label: Columbia
- Producer: Bob Johnston (original); Bob Irwin (re-release)

Johnny Cash chronology
The Holy Land (1969)	At San Quentin (1969)	More of Old Golden Throat (1969)

Singles from At San Quentin
- 1. "A Boy Named Sue" Released: July 26, 1969

Johnny Cash at San Quentin is the 31st overall album and second live album by American singer-songwriter Johnny Cash, recorded live at San Quentin State Prison on February 24, 1969, and released on June 16 of that same year. The concert was filmed by Granada Television, produced and directed by Michael Darlow. The album was the second in Cash's conceptual series of live prison albums that also included At Folsom Prison (1968), På Österåker (1973), and A Concert Behind Prison Walls (2003).

The album was certified gold on August 12, 1969, platinum and double platinum on November 21, 1986, and triple platinum on March 27, 2003, by the RIAA. The album was nominated for a number of Grammy Awards, including Album of the Year and won Best Male Country Vocal Performance for "A Boy Named Sue."

There have been several releases with different songs and set order. The album cover photo by Jim Marshall is considered to be an iconic image of Cash, with Marshall Grant's Epiphone Newport bass guitar famously silhouetted in the foreground.

== Recording ==
Johnny Cash had previously recorded a concert at a prison in 1968 at Folsom State Prison. This concert was recorded for a live LP and a television documentary for the UK. On the original LP release, the song order was changed and several songs were cut, presumably for space reasons. Despite the timing limitations of the vinyl LP format, however, both performances of the song "San Quentin" (Cash agreed to perform an encore at the audience's request) are included on the original album. Early CDs that feature this and At Folsom Prison on the same disc, however, contain only the second version due to time constraints. Some of the songs were censored. Despite the title of the version released on CD in 2000 – At San Quentin (The Complete 1969 Concert) – the CD does not contain the entire concert uncut, but does feature additional tracks and running order that parallels the actual setlist. Performed but not included were the songs "Jackson" and "Orange Blossom Special", which are included in the video release of the show (both songs had been included in At Folsom Prison). Two songs were somehow slowed down by half a step ("Starkville City Jail" and "Blistered"), possibly due to using another tape machine while the tape on the original machine was changed.

This was Cash's first album recorded without his longtime lead guitar player and Tennessee Two founder Luther Perkins, who had died several months earlier. On the album, Cash is heard paying tribute to Perkins (who was not related to Carl Perkins, who appears on the recording as lead guitarist on several tracks).

Two songs are performed live on stage for the first time during the show: "San Quentin" and "A Boy Named Sue". According to biographer Robert Hilburn, the decision had already been made for Cash to perform "San Quentin" twice as it was considered the major new song of the set, though on record Cash makes it appear as if the encore is due to audience demand; producer Bob Johnston ultimately chose to include both versions of the song on the album. According to Hilburn, Cash spontaneously decided to perform "A Boy Named Sue" during the show and neither the TV crew nor his band knew he planned to do it (though he gave them advance warning by announcing early in the show his intent to play it); he used a lyric sheet on stage while the band improvised the backing. Another new song, "Starkville City Jail," described the night he spent in a Mississippi jail for trespassing while picking flowers. An article published by Rolling Stone in 2021 detailed Cash's memorable adventures that evening.

== TV special and middle finger photo ==
A crew from Granada Television in the UK filmed the concert for broadcast on television. In the extended version of the concert released by Columbia/Legacy in 2000, Cash is heard expressing frustration at being told what to sing and where to stand prior to his performance of "I Walk the Line". The famous image of an angry-looking Cash giving the middle finger gesture to a camera originates from the performance; in his liner notes for the 2000 reissue, Cash explains that he was frustrated at having Granada's film crew blocking his view of the audience. When the crew ignored his request to "clear the stage", he made the gesture.

== Reception ==
Professional ratings
Review scores
Source	Rating
AllMusic	5/5 stars
Blender (2000 edition)	5/5 stars
Encyclopedia of Popular Music	4/5 stars
The Great Rock Discography	7/10
Music Story	4.5/5 stars
MusicHound Country	4.5/5
PopMatters (2006 edition)	10/10
Q	4/5 stars
The Rolling Stone Album Guide	3/5 stars

Reviewing for The Village Voice in 1969, Robert Christgau said of the album, "Much inferior to Folsom Prison and Greatest Hits, which is where to start if you're just getting into Cash. Contains only nine songs, one of which is performed twice. Another was written by Bob Dylan." Rolling Stone magazine's Phil Marsh wrote, "Cash sounds very tired on this record ('ol' Johnny does best under pressure,' he says), his voice on some songs just straying off pitch. But the feeling that actual human communication is taking place more than compensates for this. Communicating to an audience at the time is becoming a lost art because of the ascension of recorded music as the music of this culture."

The album was nominated for a number of Grammy Awards, including Album of the Year and won Best Male Country Vocal Performance for "A Boy Named Sue".

Reviewing the 2000 Columbia/Legacy reissue, Blender magazine's Phil Sutcliffe said, "Cash, just 25 [sic], sings as old as the hills — and looks oddly Volcanic. Prisoners 'have their hearts torn out,' Cash reckoned. It sounds as if he did too, wild-eyed and shuddering at the oppression of the walls. The crowd is a 1,000-strong caged animal. The reissue, with nine extra tracks, surpasses the vinyl original."

== Track listing ==
=== Original release ===
Side one
No.	Title	Writer(s)	Length
1.	"Wanted Man"	Bob Dylan	3:24
2.	"Wreck of the Old 97"	arranged by Cash, Bob Johnston, Norman Blake	2:17
3.	"I Walk the Line"	Johnny Cash	3:13
4.	"Darling Companion"	John Sebastian	6:10
5.	"Starkville City Jail"	Johnny Cash	2:01

Side two
No.	Title	Writer(s)	Length
1.	"San Quentin"	Johnny Cash	4:07
2.	"San Quentin" (performed a second time at the audience's request)	Johnny Cash	3:13
3.	"A Boy Named Sue"	Shel Silverstein	3:53
4.	"(There'll Be) Peace in the Valley"	Thomas A. Dorsey	2:37
5.	"Folsom Prison Blues"	Johnny Cash	1:29

== Personnel ==
- Johnny Cash – vocals, rhythm guitar, harmonica
- June Carter Cash – vocals
- Carter Family – vocals, autoharp, acoustic guitar
- Marshall Grant – bass guitar
- W.S. Holland – drums
- Carl Perkins – rhythm guitar, lead guitar, vocals
- Bob Wootton – lead guitar
- The Statler Brothers – vocals

== Charts ==
Chart (1969)	Peak position
US Top LPs (Billboard)	1
US Country LPs (Billboard)	1

== Certifications and sales ==
Region	Certification	Certified units/sales
Australia (ARIA)	Platinum	50,000^{^}
Canada (Music Canada)	Platinum	100,000^{^}
Ireland (IRMA)	Gold	7,500^{^}
Sweden (GLF)	Platinum	130,000
United Kingdom (BPI)	Gold	100,000^{*}
United States (RIAA)	3× Platinum	3,000,000^{^}
^{*} Sales figures based on certification alone.^{^} Shipments figures based on certification alone.
