= At Folsom Prison =

Live album by Johnny Cash
- Released: May 6, 1968
- Recorded: January 13, 1968
- Venue: Folsom State Prison (Folsom, California)
- Genres: Country; rock
- Length: 45:05
- Label: Columbia
- Producer: Bob Johnston

Johnny Cash chronology
From Sea to Shining Sea (1968)	At Folsom Prison (1968)	Old Golden Throat (1968)

Singles from At Folsom Prison
- 1. "Folsom Prison Blues" Released: April 30, 1968

At Folsom Prison is the first live album by American singer-songwriter Johnny Cash, released by Columbia Records on May 6, 1968. It was recorded at Folsom State Prison, California, on January 13, 1968.

After his 1955 song "Folsom Prison Blues", Cash had been interested in recording a performance at a prison. His idea was delayed until 1967, when personnel changes at Columbia Records saw Bob Johnston placed in charge of producing Cash's material. Cash had controlled his drug-abuse problems and was seeking to resuscitate his career after several years of limited success. Backed by June Carter, Carl Perkins and the Tennessee Three, Cash performed two shows at Folsom State Prison.

Despite little initial promotion by Columbia, At Folsom Prison reached number one on the Top Country Charts and the top 15 of the national album chart. The lead single, a performance of "Folsom Prison Blues", was Cash's first top-40 hit since 1964's "Understand Your Man". At Folsom Prison received positive reviews and revitalized Cash's career. At the 11th Annual Grammy Awards in 1969, it won for Best Album Notes, and "Folsom Prison Blues" won for Best Country Vocal Performance, Male.

Cash recorded three more live albums in prisons: At San Quentin (1969), På Österåker (1973) and A Concert Behind Prison Walls (1976). At Folsom Prison was rereleased with additional tracks in 1999, and again in 2018 for Record Store Day. It was certified triple platinum in 2003 for American sales exceeding 3.4 million. It has been cited by numerous critics as one of the greatest albums and was included in Rolling Stone's list of the 500 greatest albums of all time.

== Background ==
Johnny Cash became interested in Folsom State Prison, California, while serving in the United States Air Force Security Service. In 1953, his unit watched Crane Wilbur's 1951 film Inside the Walls of Folsom Prison. The film inspired Cash to write a song that reflected his perception of prison life. The result was "Folsom Prison Blues", Cash's second single on Sun Records. The song became popular among inmates, who would write to Cash, requesting him to perform at their prisons. Cash's first prison performance was at Huntsville State Prison in 1957. Satisfied by the favorable reception, he performed at several other prisons in the years leading up to the Folsom performance in 1968.

A few years after attaining commercial success from songs such as "I Walk the Line", "Understand Your Man", and "Ring of Fire", Cash's popularity began to wane, due in part to his increasing dependence on drugs. In 1967, Cash sought help for his escalating drug problems and by the end of the year, began turning his career around. At this time, the country music division of Columbia Records underwent major personnel changes. Cash's previous producers Frank Jones and Don Law were ousted in favor of Bob Johnston, who was known for his erratic behavior and willingness to disagree with studio executives. Cash saw this as an opportunity to pitch his idea of recording a live album at a prison, which Johnston enthusiastically supported. Johnston contacted San Quentin State Prison and Folsom, with Folsom being the first to respond.

== Recording ==
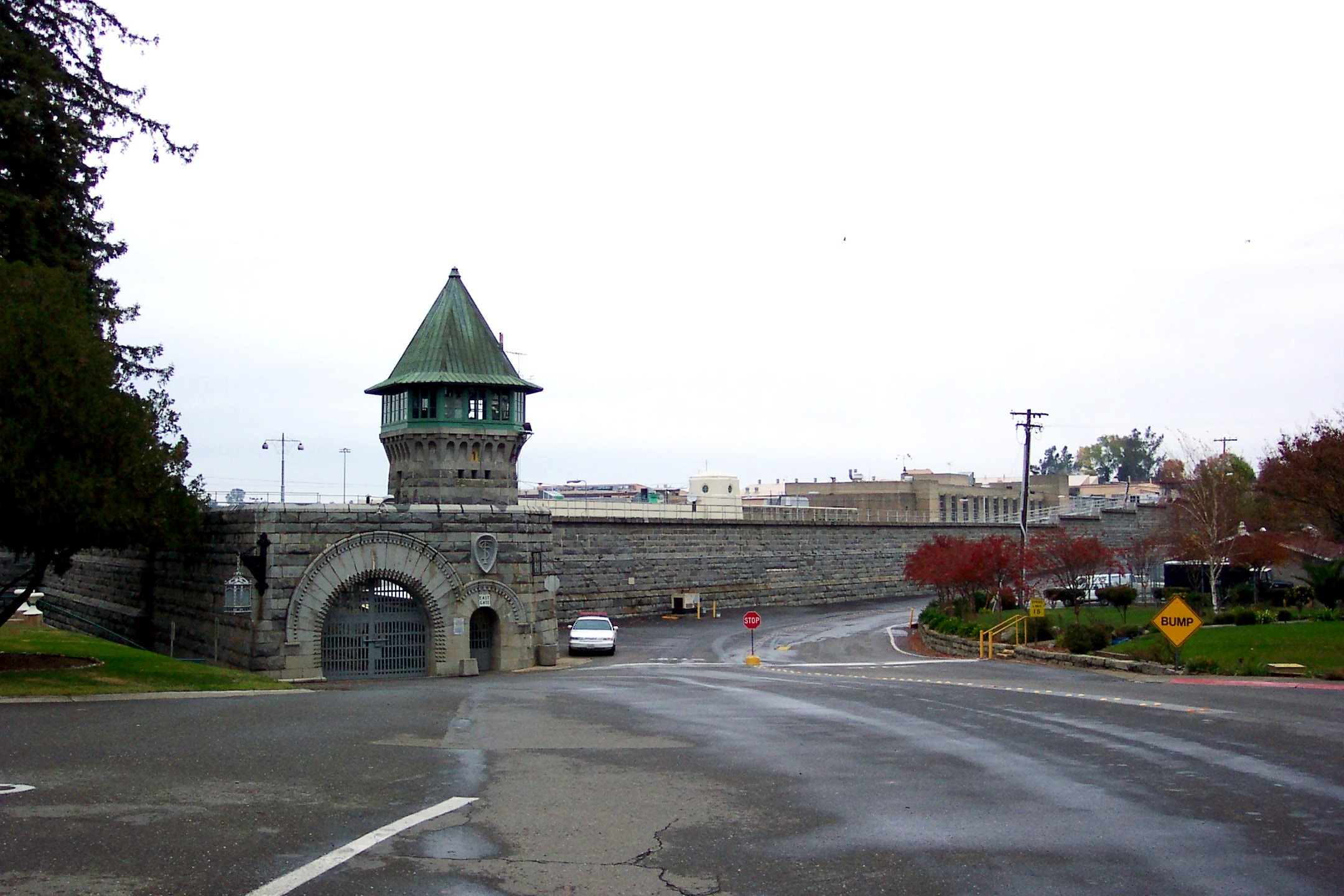
Folsom State Prison in Folsom, California

On January 10, 1968, Cash and his future wife, singer June Carter, registered at the El Rancho Motel in Sacramento, California. They were later accompanied by the Tennessee Three, Carl Perkins, the Statler Brothers, Johnny's father Ray Cash, Reverend Floyd Gressett, pastor of Avenue Community Church in Ventura, California (where Cash often attended services), who counseled inmates at Folsom and helped facilitate the concert and producer Johnston. The performers rehearsed for two days, an uncommon occurrence for them, sometimes with two or more songs rehearsed concurrently by various combinations of musicians.

One focus of the sessions was to learn "Greystone Chapel", a song written by inmate Glen Sherley. Sherley had previously recorded a version of the song that he sent to Rev. Gressett via the prison's recreation director. During the rehearsals on January 12, California governor Ronald Reagan, who was at the hotel for an after-dinner speech, visited the band and offered his encouragement. On January 13, the group traveled to Folsom, meeting Los Angeles Times writer Robert Hilburn and Columbia photographer Jim Marshall, who were hired to document the album for the liner notes.

On January 13, 1968, two performances by Cash were recorded at Folsom, one at 9:40 a.m. and another at 12:40 p.m. in case the first performance was unsatisfactory. After an introduction by MC Hugh Cherry, who encouraged the prisoners to "respond" to Cash's performance, Carl Perkins performed his hit "Blue Suede Shoes". The Statler Brothers then sang their hit "Flowers on the Wall" and the country standard "This Old House". Cherry returned to the stage and instructed the inmates not to cheer for Cash until he introduced himself; they obliged. The period in which Cash waited for his introduction would become the opening scene of the 2005 Cash biopic Walk the Line.

Cash opened both shows with a rendition of "Folsom Prison Blues", followed by many songs about prison, including "The Wall", "Green, Green Grass of Home" and the gallows humor song "25 Minutes to Go". Cash also included other songs of despair, such as the Merle Travis song "Dark as a Dungeon". Following "Orange Blossom Special", Cash included a few "slow, ballad-type songs", including "Send a Picture of Mother" and "The Long Black Veil", followed by three novelty songs from his album Everybody Loves a Nut: "Dirty Old Egg-Sucking Dog", "Flushed from the Bathroom of Your Heart" and "Joe Bean". Carter joined Cash to perform a pair of duets. After a seven-minute version of a song from his Blood, Sweat and Tears album, "The Legend of John Henry's Hammer", Cash took a break and Carter recited a poem. Cash ended both concerts with Sherley's "Greystone Chapel". The first concert was considered to be superior to the second, as the musicians were fatigued from the earlier show. Only two songs from the second concert, "Give My Love to Rose" and "I Got Stripes", were included on the album.

Set list for the 9:40 a.m. concert
- "Folsom Prison Blues"
- "Busted"
- "Dark as a Dungeon"
- "I Still Miss Someone"
- "Cocaine Blues"
- "25 Minutes to Go"
- "I'm Not in Your Town to Stay"
- "Orange Blossom Special"
- "The Long Black Veil"
- "Send a Picture of Mother"
- "The Wall"
- "Dirty Old Egg-Sucking Dog"
- "Flushed from the Bathroom of Your Heart"
- "Joe Bean"
- "Jackson"
- "I Got a Woman"
- "The Legend of John Henry's Hammer"
- "Green, Green Grass of Home"
- "Greystone Chapel"
Set list for the 12:40 p.m. concert
- "Folsom Prison Blues"
- "Busted"
- "Dark as a Dungeon"
- "Cocaine Blues"
- "25 Minutes to Go"
- "Orange Blossom Special"
- "The Legend of John Henry's Hammer"
- "Give My Love to Rose"
- "Dirty Old Egg-Sucking Dog"
- "Flushed from the Bathroom of Your Heart"
- "Joe Bean"
- "Jackson"
- "Long-Legged Guitar Pickin' Man"
- "I Got Stripes"
- "Green, Green Grass of Home"
- "Greystone Chapel"
- "Greystone Chapel" (repeat)

== Reception ==
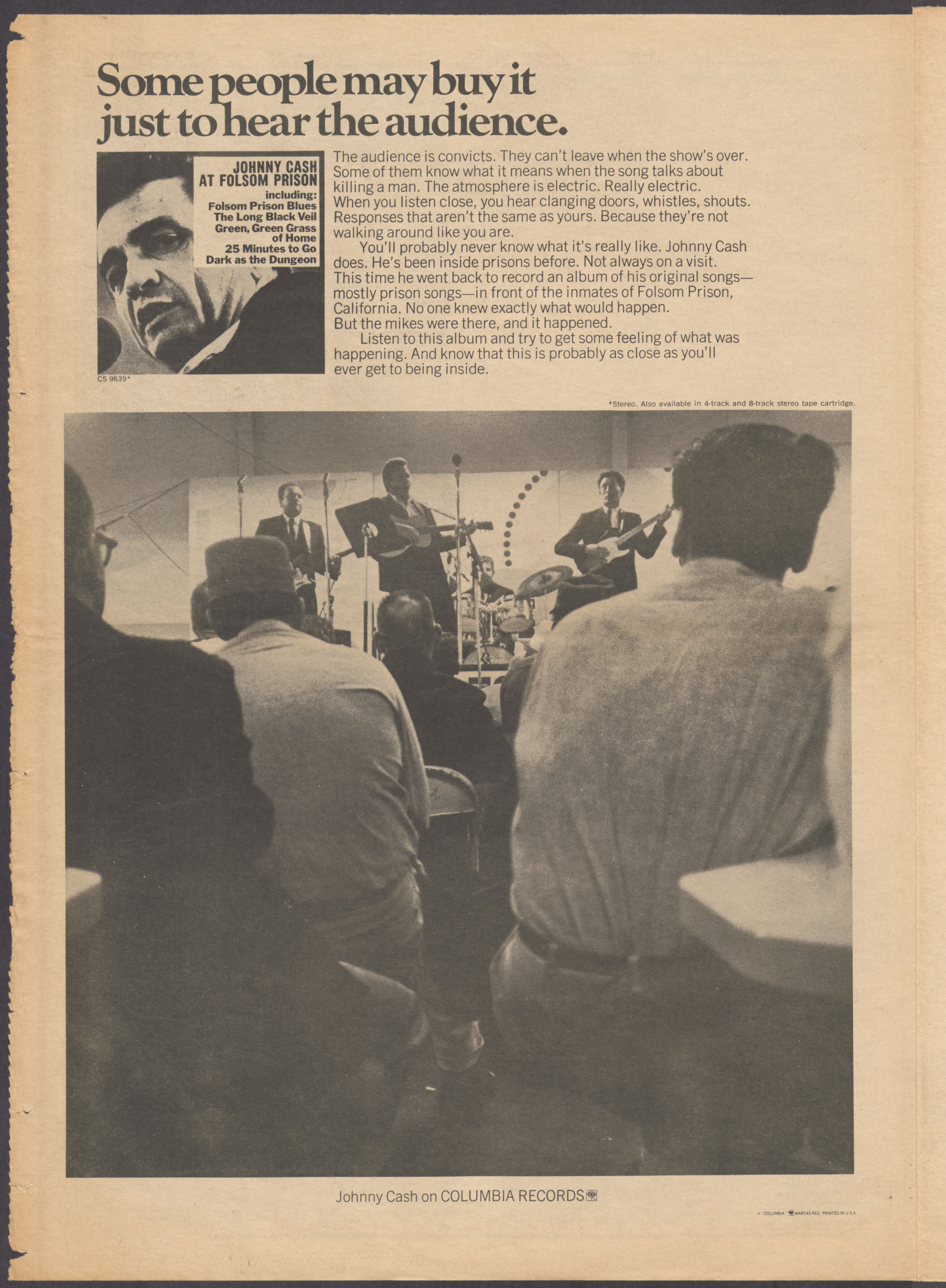
A full-page ad for the album in Seattle underground paper Helix (July 3rd 1968).

The album release of At Folsom Prison was prepared in four months. Despite the recent success of "Rosanna's Going Wild", a Cash single released just before the Folsom concerts that reached number two on the Top Country Charts, Columbia initially invested little in the album or its single "Folsom Prison Blues". This was partly because Columbia focused its promotional efforts on pop stars rather than on country artists. However, the single charted on the Billboard Hot 100 on May 25, 1968 and entered the Hot Country Singles chart one week later.

Following the assassination of Robert F. Kennedy on June 5, 1968, some radio stations stopped playing the single because of the line "I shot a man in Reno / Just to watch him die". Columbia withdrew the original single and demanded that Johnston edit out the line. In spite of protests by Cash, the single was edited and reissued with the new version reaching number one on the Hot Country Singles chart and the top 40 on the Hot 100. The success of the single allowed the album to climb the charts, eventually reaching number one on the Top Country Albums chart and number 13 on the Pop Albums chart. By August 1968, Folsom had shipped more than 300,000 copies; in October, it was certified gold for shipping more than 500,000 copies.

At Folsom Prison received rave reviews. Al Aronowitz of Life stated that Cash sang the songs like "someone who has grown up believing he is one of the people that these songs are about". For The Village Voice, Ann Fisher wrote that "every cut is special in its own way" and Richard Goldstein said the album was "filled with the kind of emotionalism you seldom find in rock". Fredrick E. Danker of Sing Out! praised it as "an album structured an aural experience for us". At the 11th Annual Grammy Awards in 1969, the album won the award for Best Album Notes and "Folsom Prison Blues" won for Best Country Vocal Performance, Male.

== Legacy ==
Professional ratings
Review scores
Source	Rating
AllMusic	5/5 stars
Pitchfork	9.7/10
PopMatters	10/10
Rolling Stone	4/5 stars
The Rolling Stone Album Guide	5/5 stars

The success of the album revitalized Cash's career. According to Cash, "That's where things really got started for me again." Sun Records remixed Cash's previous B-side "Get Rhythm" with applause similar to that heard on the album and it reached the Hot 100. Cash returned to the prison scene in 1969 when he recorded At San Quentin at San Quentin State Prison. At San Quentin became Cash's first album to reach number one on the pop chart and produced the number-two hit "A Boy Named Sue". The ensuing popularity from the Folsom concert also prompted ABC to give Cash his own television show.

The album was rereleased on October 19, 1999 including three extra tracks excluded from the original LP: "Busted", "Joe Bean" and "The Legend of John Henry's Hammer". Stephen Thomas Erlewine of AllMusic praised the new version, calling it "the ideal blend of mythmaking and gritty reality." On May 27, 2003, At Folsom Prison was certified triple platinum for shipping more than three million copies.

At Folsom Prison has been cited as one of the greatest albums by several sources. In 2003, it was ranked number 88 on Rolling Stone's list of the 500 greatest albums of all time, maintaining the rating in a 2012 revised list and ranking at number 164 in a 2020 revised list. Also in 2003, it was one of 50 recordings chosen by the Library of Congress to be added to the National Recording Registry. Country Music Television named it the third-greatest album in country music in 2006. Blender listed the album as the 63rd-greatest American album of all time and as one of the "500 CDs You Must Own". In 2006, Time listed it among the 100 greatest albums. Both Far Out and Guitar World ranked it as the best live album of all time. The album was also included in the book 1001 Albums You Must Hear Before You Die.

In 2008, Columbia and Legacy Records reissued At Folsom Prison in an expanded edition with both concerts uncut and remastered. It includes a DVD produced by Bestor Cram and Michael Streissguth of Northern Light Productions, with pictures and interviews. Pitchfork Media praised the reissue, saying it had "the force of empathic endeavors, as if [Cash] were doing penance for his notorious bad habits". Christian Hoard wrote for Rolling Stone that the reissue "makes for an excellent historical document, highlighting Cash's rapport with prison folk". In 2018, At Folsom Prison was inducted into the Grammy Hall of Fame.

== Track listing ==
Side one
No.	Title	Writer(s)	Length
1.	"Folsom Prison Blues"	Johnny Cash	2:42
2.	"Dark as a Dungeon"	Merle Travis	3:05
3.	"I Still Miss Someone"	J. Cash, Roy Cash Jr.	1:38
4.	"Cocaine Blues"	T.J. Arnall	3:01
5.	"25 Minutes to Go"	Shel Silverstein	3:31
6.	"Orange Blossom Special"	Ervin T. Rouse	3:01
7.	"The Long Black Veil"	Marijohn Wilkin, Danny Dill	3:57

Side two
No.	Title	Writer(s)	Length
1.	"Send a Picture of Mother"	Cash	2:11
2.	"The Wall"	Harlan Howard	1:49
3.	"Dirty Old Egg-Suckin' Dog"	Jack H. Clement	1:17
4.	"Flushed from the Bathroom of Your Heart"	Clement	2:39
5.	"Jackson" (with June Carter)	Billy Edd Wheeler, Jerry Leiber	2:56
6.	"Give My Love to Rose" (with June Carter)	Cash	2:41
7.	"I Got Stripes"	Cash, Charlie Williams	1:42
8.	"Green, Green Grass of Home"	Curly Putman	2:57
9.	"Greystone Chapel"	Glen Sherley	5:34

== Personnel ==
- Johnny Cash – vocals, guitar, harmonica
- June Carter – vocal
- Marshall Grant – bass guitar
- W.S. Holland – drums
- Carl Perkins – electric guitar, vocals on track 2
- Luther Perkins – electric guitar
- The Statler Brothers (Lew DeWitt, Don Reid, Harold Reid, Phil Balsley) – vocals
- Bob Johnston – producer
- Bob Breault – engineer
- Bill Britain – engineer
- Jim Marshall – photography

== Charts ==
Chart (1968)	Peak position
Norwegian Albums Chart	7
UK Albums Chart	7
U.S. Pop Albums	13
U.S. Top Country Albums	1
Chart (1969)	Peak position
Canada RPM LP Chart	27

== Certifications ==
Region	Certification	Certified units/sales
Canada (Music Canada)	Platinum	100,000^{^}
Ireland (IRMA)	Gold	7,500^{^}
United Kingdom (BPI)	Gold	100,000^{^}
United States (RIAA)	3× Platinum	3,000,000^{^}
^{^} Shipments figures based on certification alone.
