= Ida Beasley Elliott =

Lady Ida Beasley Elliott (December 25, 1864 – 1948) was a missionary to Burma and one of the first women to own a business in Winchester, Tennessee. Because of her work in Burma, Queen Victoria damed Ida Beasley Elliott.

Lady Ida Beasley Elliott was a Baptist missionary and was married to Enoch Guy Elliott on October 24, 1883, in Winchester, Franklin County, Tennessee. Her husband Enoch Guy Elliott was friends with Peter Turney who later became governor of Tennessee. Enoch Guy Elliott was the builder of the 2nd Tennessee State Prison, and was Chief Warden of the old Tennessee State Prison.
