= På Österåker =

Johnny Cash på Österåker

Live album by Johnny Cash
- Released: January 1973
- Recorded: October 3, 1972
- Venue: Österåker Prison (Sweden)
- Genre: Country; folk; gospel
- Length: 34:07
- Label: Columbia
- Producer: Larry Butler; Charlie Bragg

Johnny Cash chronology
International Superstar (1972)	Johnny Cash på Österåker (1973)	Any Old Wind That Blows (1973)

Singles from Johnny Cash på Österåker
- 1. "Orleans Parish Prison" Released: January 11, 1974

Professional ratings
Review scores
Source	Rating
Allmusic	2/5 stars

Johnny Cash på Österåker (Swedish for 'At Österåker') is a live album by country singer Johnny Cash released on Columbia Records in 1973, making it his 43rd overall release. The album features Cash's concert at the Österåker Prison in Sweden held on October 3, 1972. Its counterparts in concept are the more notable At Folsom Prison (1968), At San Quentin (1969), and A Concert Behind Prison Walls (1976). Unlike aforementioned, På Österåker does not contain any of Cash's most well-known songs; it does, however, include a version of Kris Kristofferson's "Me and Bobby McGee". "Orleans Parish Prison" was released as a single, faring rather poorly on the charts. Cash had previously recorded "I Saw a Man" for his 1959 album, Hymns by Johnny Cash.

The majority of the songs featured in the original release would remain unique to this concert recording, though Cash would later record a studio version of "City Jail" for his 1977 album The Last Gunfighter Ballad. Some lyrics from "City Jail" taken from the protagonist's dialogue with a policeman would later be incorporated by Cash into live performances of "Orange Blossom Special".

== Track listing ==
No.	Title	Writer(s)	Length
1.	"Orleans Parish Prison"	Dick Feller	2:32
2.	"Jacob Green"	Johnny Cash	3:07
3.	"Me and Bobby McGee"	Fred Foster, Kris Kristofferson	3:11
4.	"The Prisoner's Song"	Guy Massey	2:24
5.	"The Invertebraes"	Johnny Cash, Gordon D. Dillingham, Charles A. Johnston	2:27
6.	"That Silver Haired Daddy of Mine"	Gene Autry, Jimmy Long	3:08
7.	"City Jail"	Johnny Cash	3:56
8.	"Life of a Prisoner"	Jimmy Lee Wilkerson	2:49
9.	"Looking Back in Anger"	Harlan Sanders, Glen Sherley	2:14
10.	"Nobody Cared"	June Carter Cash	2:07
11.	"Help Me Make It Through the Night"	Kris Kristofferson	3:09
12.	"I Saw a Man"	Arthur Smith	3:03

== Personnel ==
- Johnny Cash – vocals, acoustic guitar
- Marshall Grant – bass
- W.S. Holland – drums
- Bob Wootton – electric guitar
- Carl Perkins – vocals, electric guitar
- Larry Butler – piano

=== Additional personnel (2007 reissue only) ===
- Original Recordings Produced by: Larry Butler & Charlie Bragg
- Produced for Reissue By: Al Quaglieri
- Mixed and Mastered by: Bob Irwin at Sundazed Studios
- Legacy A&R: Steve Berkowitz
- Project Direction: Lars Hoglund & Tom Burleigh
- Art Direction and Design: Ricky Tillblad & Joan Kjellberg/Zion Graphics
- Photography: Don Hunstein, Sony BMG Archives
- Executive Producers: John Carter Cash & Lou Robin

== Charts ==
Singles – Billboard (United States)

Year	Single	Chart	Position
1974	"Orleans Parish Prison"	Country Singles	52
