= Glen Sherley =

American singer-songwriter (1936–1978)

- Born: March 9, 1936
- Died: May 11, 1978 (aged 42) Gonzales, California, US
- Occupations: Singer, guitarist, and songwriter

Glen Milborn Sherley (March 9, 1936 − May 11, 1978) was an American who became a country singer-songwriter after his song "Greystone Chapel" was made famous by Johnny Cash in 1968. Sherley wrote the song while in prison and it was later performed by Cash at his Folsom Prison performance, which was eventually released as the album At Folsom Prison. Sherley was in the front row, unaware that his song was going to be performed.

Sherley subsequently wrote and performed a number of other songs. He took his own life at the age of 42.

== Biography ==
=== Early life ===
Sherley was born in 1936 as the son of farm workers in Oklahoma. They migrated to California in the 1940s to work in cotton fields, potato farms and more. Sherley was a youth offender, and through the 1950s and 1960s was frequently in and out of prison for various crimes including one jailbreak. By the time he was discovered by Johnny Cash in 1968 while serving time for armed robbery, Sherley had been an inmate of several state penitentiaries, including Chino, Soledad, San Quentin, and Folsom.

=== "Greystone Chapel" ===
During the late 1960s, Sherley wrote and recorded "Greystone Chapel," in reference to the chapel within Folsom Prison, where he was an inmate at the time. On January 12, 1968 a copy of this recording made its way into the hands of Johnny Cash by way of Floyd Gressett, a Folsom minister who was a friend of Cash's, the night before he was due to appear in concert at Folsom.

In an interview with Life magazine in 1994 titled "Country Rocks The Country", Johnny Cash said:

The night before I was going to record at Folsom prison, I got to the motel and a preacher friend of mine brought me a tape of a song called "Greystone Chapel." He said a convict had written it about the chapel at Folsom. I listened to it one time and I said, "I've got to do this in the show tomorrow." So I stayed up and learned it, and the next day the preacher had him in the front row. I announced, "This song was written by Glen Sherley." It was a terrible, terrible thing to point him out among all those cons, but I didn't think about that then. Everybody just had a fit, screaming and carrying on.

"Greystone Chapel" was recorded, along with the rest of Cash's Folsom performance, on January 13, 1968.

=== Success ===
After being transferred from Folsom Prison to Vacaville, he worked in the prison hospital unit where he met Spade Cooley, who was serving a life sentence for murder, until his death in 1969 while on a 72-hour leave from prison. Cooley was known to be a positive influence on Sherley. Sherley was able to refine his music abilities as well as his abilities to deal with audiences.

After the release of Greystone Chapel, Sherley's next major success came in 1971, when country singer Eddy Arnold recorded another song written by Sherley, "Portrait Of My Woman." The song became the title track of Arnold's next release.

Following the fame gained through the Arnold release, Sherley was offered the chance to record a live album, Glen Sherley, while still in prison. The album was a success when it was recorded, with the permission of prison officials, and released by Mega Records. Production supervision was provided by Cash's publishing organization, House of Cash, with musicians from the Nashville area, leading to an offer from Johnny Cash for Sherley to join House of Cash. When Sherley was released from prison in 1971, he was met at the gates by Cash. His album was re-released by Bear Family Records as Glen Sherley - Live at Vacaville, California. A remastered version of his album was produced and released by his estate in 2017. The Album "Glen Sherley: Released Again" includes three bonus tracks, one of which is an original demo he recorded in his cell.

When the documentary Flower Out of Place was filmed, showcasing Cash, Linda Ronstadt and Roy Clark performing at Tennessee State Prison, Sherley hosted the performance. Recent CD and DVD releases of this documentary exclude Sherley's performance, possibly due to time constraints.

According to Marshall Grant, bass player and road manager for Cash, Sherley exhibited behavior that indicated he was a pathological criminal. He casually made comments about killing members of the cast of Cash's show, and made threats. Cash himself became concerned about Sherley's potential for violence, and eventually dismissed him.

=== Final years ===
After his departure from Cash's show, Sherley struggled to cope with stardom. Sherley went on to lose his footing in Nashville and became estranged from his wife and children. He quickly faded out of the limelight, into obscurity. Sherley ended up working for a large cattle company, feeding 10,000 cattle a day. He lived in the cab of a semi truck, and tried to stay out of the public eye. His use of alcohol and other drugs increased, ultimately spiraling out of control.

In May 1978, while high on drugs, Sherley shot a man. Sometime after that he called his daughter to say he was not going back to jail. Two days later, on May 11, while hiding out at his brother's house in Gonzales, California, he shot himself in the head. Cash volunteered to pay for the funeral, and the 42-year-old Glen Sherley was laid to rest in Shafter, California.

=== In popular culture ===
In the 2005 Johnny Cash biopic film Walk the Line, Cash reads a letter presumably written by Sherley. Sherley's name briefly appears in a shot of the letter, but it is misspelled as "Glen Shirley."
