= The New Orleans Bingo! Show =

- Origin: New Orleans
- Genres: rock
- Members: Clint Maedgen, Ron Rona, Mattvaughan Black, Michael Miller, Lucas Davenport, Keith Hajjar, Trixie Minx
- Past members: Earl Scioneaux III, Marty Lastrapes, VeVe LaRoux, Brynn Savage
- Website: https://www.facebook.com/The.New.Orleans.Bingo.Show/

The New Orleans Bingo! Show is an interactive theatrical cabaret and musical band from New Orleans, Louisiana. The show features original music by New Orleans singer and songwriter Clint Maedgen who created the show in 2002. The show also features original short films, comedic skits and a live game of bingo played with the audience. The group toured with the Preservation Hall Jazz Band in 2007 and 2008.

The Bingo! Show played at The Voodoo Experience held at City Park in New Orleans, Louisiana over Halloween weekend for several years. As of 2017, they last performed in 2014.
