= Folsom State Prison =

Prison in Folsom, California, United States

Folsom California State Prison
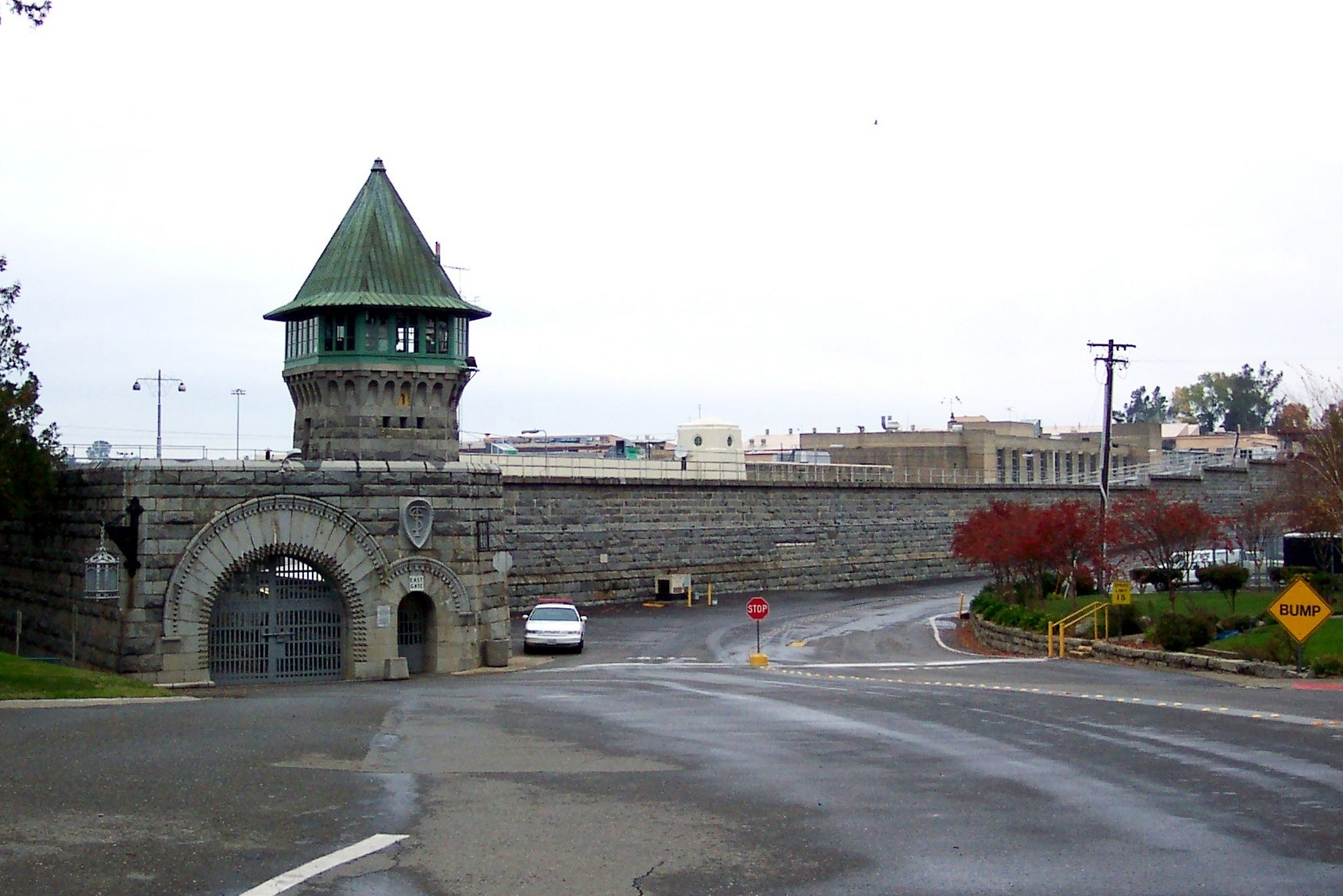
- East Gate, Folsom State Prison, at the end of Prison Road
- Interactive map of Folsom California State Prison
- Location: Folsom, California, U.S.; 38°41′42″N 121°09′45″W
- Status: Operational
- Security class: Medium Security
- Capacity: 2,065
- Population: 2,513 (121.7% capacity) (January 31, 2023)
- Opened: July 26, 1880; 146 years ago
- Managed by: Rosalinda Rosalez, Warden (Acting) Stefanie Keenan, Chief Executive Officer Healthcare
- Website: https://www.cdcr.ca.gov/facility-locator/fsp/

Location in California

Folsom California State Prison is a California State Prison in Folsom, California, United States, approximately 20 miles (32 km) northeast of the state capital of Sacramento. It is one of 34 adult institutions operated by the California Department of Corrections and Rehabilitation.

Opened in 1880, Folsom is the state's second-oldest prison, after San Quentin, and the first in the United States to have electricity. Folsom was also one of the first maximum security prisons. It has been the execution site of 93 condemned prisoners.

Musician Johnny Cash put on two live performances at the prison on January 13, 1968. These were recorded and released as a live album titled At Folsom Prison. He had written and recorded the song "Folsom Prison Blues" more than a decade earlier.

== Facilities ==
Both FSP and California State Prison, Sacramento (SAC) share the mailing address: Represa, CA 95671. Represa (translated as "dam" from the Spanish language) is the name given in 1892 to the State Prison post office because of its proximity to a dam on the American River that was under construction at the time. The dam was replaced in 1955 by the Folsom Dam.

The facility includes five housing units within the secure perimeter, including the original two-tiered structure. Unit 1 is the most populous cellblock in the United States, with a capacity of nearly 1,200 inmates on four five-tiered sections. All cells include a toilet, sink, bunks, and storage space for inmate possessions. Prison facilities also include two dining halls, a large central prison exercise yard, and two smaller exercise yards. The visiting room includes an attached patio as well as space for non-contact visits.

As of April 30, 2020, FSP's men's facilities were incarcerating people at 130.4% of design capacity, with 2,694 occupants, and FSP's women's facilities were incarcerating people at 68.5% of design capacity, with 276 occupants.

== History ==
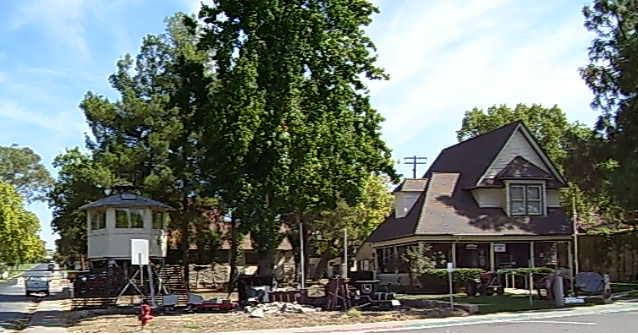
Folsom Prison museum in 2008

FSP is California's second-oldest prison, long known for its harsh conditions in the decades following the California Gold Rush. Although FSP now houses primarily medium security prisoners, it was one of America's first maximum security prisons.

Construction of the facility began in 1857 on the site of the Stony Bar mining camp along the American River. The prison officially opened in 1880 with a capacity of 1,800 inmates. They spent most of their time in the dark, behind solid boiler plate doors in stone cells measuring 4 by 8 ft (1.2 by 2.4 m) with 6-inch (15 cm) eye slots. Air holes were drilled into the cell doors in the 1940s, and the cell doors are still in use today.

FSP was the first prison in the world to have electric power, which was provided by the first hydroelectric powerhouse in California, Folsom Powerhouse.

After the state of California took sole control of the death penalty in 1891, executions were held at Folsom and San Quentin. A total of 93 prisoners were hanged at FSP between December 13, 1895, and December 3, 1937. Subsequent executions were carried out in the gas chamber at San Quentin. Due to an incorrect record, it is often mistaken that there were 92 executions, but there were in fact 93.

The prison's first hanging occurred December 13, 1895 when Chen Hane was "hanged by the neck until dead" at 10:00 am. The public was invited to witness the execution. In 1892 Hane was accused of murdering Lee Gong, even though a witness stated they saw Lee Sam shoot Gong; another said they thought Gong had been shot through a window while sitting at a desk.

FSP industries include metal fabrication and a print shop, and the quarry at FSP provided granite for the foundation of the state capitol building and much of the gravel used in the early construction of California's roads. California's vehicle license plates have been manufactured at FSP since 1947.

In 1968, Johnny Cash played a concert at the prison. Each attending prisoner lived in his own cell and nearly all were in an education program or learning a trade. Most of the attending prisoners who were released did not return to prison after being released.

Laura Sullivan of National Public Radio said that the costs of housing prisoners "barely registered" in the state's budget. In 2009, Folsom was overcrowded, with 4,427 inmates. Around that year most of its prisoners who were released returned to prison after being released.

== Cemetery ==
Connected to the prison on a hillside above Folsom Dam is the Folsom Prison Burial Ground (or Folsom Prison Cemetery); a burial location for former inmates who died while serving a prison sentence. In 2018, the El Dorado Hills Genealogical Society started the process of researching and trying to determine which unmarked grave stone belonged to whom; the grave stones originally had only numbers and they were updated to have names as well.

== Inmate programs ==
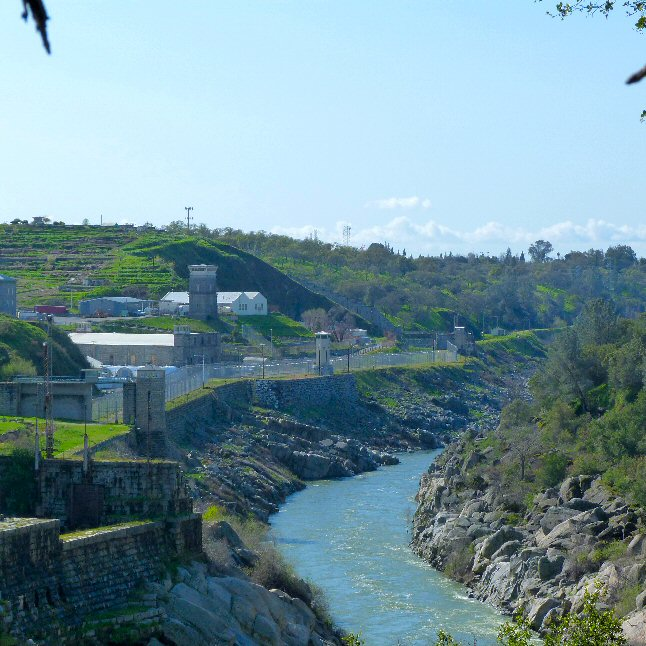
Folsom Prison from north side near the American River, 2011

=== California Prison Industry Authority (CALPIA) Now Called CALCTRA ===
California Prison Industry Authority (CALPIA) program includes administration, a Braille enterprise, a license plate factory where the inmates have been making California license plates since before the 1930s, maintenance, metal fabrication, a printing plant, and a sign shop.

=== Vocational ===
The Vocational Inmate Program referred to as Construction and Technical Education (CTE's) include welding, auto mechanics, electronics, electrical works, masonry, building-maintenance, plumbing, carpentry, roofing, Union Ironworkers, Sustainable Ecological Environmental Development (SEEDS), and office services.

=== Academic ===
The Academic Inmate Program includes Adult Basic Education, High School/GED, English as a Second Language, a literacy program, and computer assisted instruction.

== Folsom Women's Facility ==
In January 2013 the Folsom Women's Facility, a standalone section for women, opened. The northernmost women's prison in the CDCR, the facility had space for 403 women. As of 2013, 25% of the women were Hispanic. The prison housed low-risk prisoners. Folsom's Women Facility was closed during the Coronavirus pandemic. The incarcerated women were either sent to other institutions within the state, out of state, or simply released.

== Escape attempts ==
Folsom was one of the first maximum-security prisons in the United States. Prior to the completion of its granite wall in the 1920s, the prison saw numerous escape attempts; the first occurred shortly after the first inmates arrived in the 1880s. Throughout Folsom's violent and bloody history, numerous riots and escape attempts have resulted in both inmate and staff deaths.

=== 1920 prison train attempt ===
In 1920, three convicts hijacked a prison train that was used to move materials and smashed it through a prison gate to escape.

=== 1927 Thanksgiving Day attempt ===
On Thanksgiving Day, November 24, 1927, an attempted prison break resulted in a violent altercation, killing fourteen including unarmed prison guard Ray Tyree Singleton and inmate George Baker. Six men were convicted of murdering Singleton, but all received life sentences after the jury recommended mercy for all of them. Prosecutors then tried them for murdering Baker, after which they were all sentenced to death. Five of them were hanged in January 1930. In 1931, Governor James Rolph commuted the sentence of the last convict, Albert M. Stewart, to life in prison. Baker is buried in the Folsom Prison Cemetery.

=== 1932 dummy used in escape ===
On June 16, Dwight E. Abbott, a Los Angeles robber, escaped from Folsom by making a lifelike dummy. The dummy was cleverly made to look real enough with Abbott's own hair, that of his cellmate, and a plaster of Paris face, to fool the guards until late the next day. This, according to the Warden, was seen in his bed and deceived the guards until general lock-up.

=== 1932 diving suit attempt ===
An inmate, Carl Reese, tried to escape in 1932 using a diving suit fashioned from a football bladder, a goggle lens, and other scrounged materials. According to Floyd Davis, a prison guard of 13 years who continued to volunteer at the museum after his retirement, the inmate made only one mistake: he did not make his breathing tube long enough and ended up drowning in the power-house-mill pond. Guards had to drain the pond to recover the inmate's body.

=== September 19, 1937 ===
Approximately 40 inmates had been waiting to talk to Warden Clarence Larkin concerning upcoming parole hearings when seven of the inmates suddenly attacked him. As they took him into the yard, other guards started firing. In the commotion that followed, Officer Harry Martin and Warden Larkin were both stabbed to death. Officer Martin died at the scene, and Warden Larkin died of his wounds five days later.

The inmates involved in the attack were said to have attacked the Warden and the officer with shivs (prison-made knives). Also, a prison-made wooden imitation semiautomatic pistol was found; it was carved and meant for use in the attack.

One of the seven inmates who attempted to escape was wanted for the murder of Officer James Hill, of the Marlow, Oklahoma Police Department, on April 20, 1931.

Two of the escaping inmates were fatally shot during the incident. The remaining five were all sentenced to death and eventually executed in late 1938. Two suspects, including the one who had murdered Officer Hill, were executed in the gas chamber on December 2. Two others were executed on December 9, and the leader of the group was executed on December 16.

=== June 5, 1987 ===
Inmate Glen Stewart Godwin's notable escape earned him a spot on the FBI Ten Most Wanted Fugitives list.

In 1987, Godwin attempted to escape during his incarceration at Deuel Vocational Institute in Tracy, California, and he was moved to the maximum-security Folsom State Prison.

Authorities believe Godwin's wife, Shelly Rose Godwin, and his former cellmate in Deuel, Lorenz Karlic, helped to plan his successful escape from Folsom. A hacksaw and other tools had been smuggled into the prison for Godwin. On June 5, 1987, he cut a hole through fence wire and escaped into a storm drain that emptied into the American River. Godwin dropped through a manhole and crawled 750 feet through the pitch black drain. Either Godwin's wife or his accomplice Karlic had left a raft that Godwin used to float down the river, following painted arrows on rocks that directed him where to go.

In June 1987, Karlic was arrested in Hesperia, California, and convicted for aiding Godwin's escape. In January 1988, Shelly Godwin was classified as a federal fugitive for her role in her husband's escape. The FBI captured her in Dallas, Texas, on February 7, 1990.

Godwin was arrested in Mexico in 1991 but escaped again from a prison in Guadalajara in September of that year and remains at large.

=== October 19, 2010 ===
Two minimum-security inmates, Jeffrey William Howard, 43, and Garrett Daniel Summet, 34, escaped from Folsom on October 19, 2010.

Prison spokesman Lt. Anthony Gentile did not elaborate on the circumstances of how the men got away, only saying that the two men fled from the prison's Minimum Support Facility and that the escape was discovered when the two failed to report to their work areas.

Folsom State Prison correctional staff and California Department of Corrections and Rehabilitation (CDCR) Office of Correctional Safety agents initiated escapee apprehension efforts. The CDCR, local law enforcement agencies, and the California Highway Patrol joined the search for the two men, who were apprehended in Inglewood, CA on November 22, 2010.

=== October 26, 2017 ===
Inmate Todd Willis walked away at about 8 A.M. from a minimum-security housing facility at the prison; five days later on October 31, 2017, an off-duty officer was driving through Rancho Cordova when she spotted him. Police were contacted, and Willis was quickly apprehended.

== Violent incidents ==
In 1937, Warden Clarence Larkin was stabbed during an escape attempt and died from his wounds.

During the 1970s and 1980s violence at Folsom peaked, when the Mexican Mafia, Black Guerrilla Family and other prison gangs made prisons increasingly dangerous. The establishment of Secure Housing Units, first at California State Prison, Sacramento, and later at Pelican Bay State Prison in Crescent City, and California State Prison, Corcoran, did much to control gang-related violence.

On August 27, 2010, seven federal inmates at Folsom were admitted to a hospital after corrections officers discharged firearms during a riot involving 200 inmates. None of the inmates' injuries were life-threatening, and no corrections officers were injured during the incident.

On Wednesday, September 19, 2012, a fight erupted in one of the yards, shortly after 11 a.m. No prison staffers are believed to have been injured and the fight was eventually broken up by the prison guards, using less-than-lethal force, but one inmate was shot and at least ten other inmates had stab or slash wounds, authorities stated. The inmates were treated at area hospitals.

== In popular culture ==
=== Johnny Cash ===
Singer Johnny Cash made FSP widely known to the outside world through his song "Folsom Prison Blues" (1955) – which narrated a fictional account of an outlaw's incarceration, and through the two live concerts he performed at FSP. The first was in 1966; the more famous, held on January 13, 1968, in the FSP cafeteria, was recorded as the album At Folsom Prison. Cash later said the FSP inmates "were the most enthusiastic audience I ever played." The "Folsom Prison Blues" single from that album was #1 on the country music chart for four weeks, and the album was on the top 200 pop album chart for 122 weeks.

A 40th-anniversary tribute concert was to take place in the same cafeteria at FSP on January 13, 2008, with a special appearance by Cash's original drummer W. S. "Fluke" Holland. The original plans were to stream the concert over the Internet, with four nonprofit groups underwriting the show and sharing in any proceeds from the show. However, a few days before the concert was to occur, it was canceled in a dispute over filming rights, media access, and security concerns.

=== Los Tigres Del Norte ===
To celebrate the 50th anniversary of Cash's groundbreaking concert, the Sinaloa, Mexico norteño band Los Tigres del Norte performed for both male and female inmates at FSP. The performances were filmed as part of a Netflix special, and was released in September 2019.

=== Films ===
FSP has been the location of a number of feature films, including The Work, Riot in Cell Block 11, Convicts 4, American Me, The Jericho Mile, Another 48 Hrs., Diggstown, parts of Walk the Line (a biographical film of Johnny Cash), and Inside the Walls of Folsom Prison.

FSP is referenced during the 1995 film Heat. It is suggested as being the home of Neil McCauley, the movie's main protagonist, for seven years. A majority of the other accompanying crew members are said to have met and spent time in the facility.

=== Public works ===
On the M-5 freeway in Farmington Hills, MI, two service drives – named Folsom and Freedom – are adjacent to the eastbound and westbound sides respectively.

=== Music ===
Folsom Prison is mentioned in The Offspring's 1998 song "Walla Walla." However, the implied or mistaken location of Folsom is in Walla Walla, Washington, based on the song's lyrics.

=== Television ===
The series premiere of the Cartoon Network animated series Cow and Chicken, appropriately titled "Field Trip to Folsom Prison", sees the titular characters visiting the prison on a field trip, only for Chicken to end up swapping places with a prisoner named Red.

Season 2 episode 16 of The Mentalist mentions Folsom briefly, with a detective stating to the episode's criminal "you'll be the richest man in Folsom."

Folsom State Prison appears in the three-part "Retribution" saga of Where on Earth Is Carmen Sandiego? animated series as the prison where Dr. Gunnar Maelstrom (voiced by Tim Curry) was incarcerated after being arrested by Carmen when she was still with the ACME Detective Agency. He staged his apparent death in an botched prison escape via explosives to slip out in the confusion and plan revenge on Carmen, intending to get her locked up for a life imprisonment. Thanks to Carmen teaming up with Ivy and Zack and temporarily rejoining ACME, Maelstrom was recaptured and either returned to Folsom, or transferred to another U.S. federal prison, such as Florence ADX, to serve the rest of his sentence.

In the television show Animal Kingdom the character Andrew "Pope" Cody was incarcerated in Folsom Prison for three years prior to being released during season 1 episode 1.

=== Games ===
New Folsom Prison in StarCraft II: Wings of Liberty was named after the facility, or maybe after New Folsom Prison, now California State Prison, Sacramento.

== Notable inmates ==
- David Carpenter, Serial killer known as the Trailside Killer. Spent time at Folsom in the 1970s for rape, robbery, and kidnap. Paroled in February 1977.
- Charles Ng, Serial Killer, housed in Folsom awaiting trial.
- Angelo Buono Jr, Serial killer known as the Hillside Strangler. Married in 1986 at the visiting room in Folsom.
- David Misch, Serial killer.
- Joseph Barboza, former New England Mafia associate and enforcer turned government witness. He served 5 years at Folsom for second-degree murder in 1971, while in the Witness Protection Program.
- Sonny Barger, leader of the Hells Angels Motorcycle Club.
- Edward Bunker, author of crime fiction, a screenwriter, and an actor.
- Thor Nis Christiansen, was a serial killer and necrophile active in California in the mid-to-late 1970s. He was killed by a stab wound in the exercise yard in 1981.
- Eldridge Cleaver, early leader of the Black Panther Party.
- Alfred Leonard Cline, suspected serial killer
- George Contant, train robber; later lectured against crime, brother of John Sontag.
- Craig Coley, wrongfully convicted of the 1978 murder of his ex-girlfriend and her son before being pardoned and exonerated by CA governor Jerry Brown in 2017.
- Chris Evans, train robber, partner of John Sontag.
- Joseph Gamsky, aka Joe Hunt, of the Billionaire Boys Club.
- Glen Stewart Godwin, whose escape from Folsom earned him a spot on the FBI Ten Most Wanted Fugitives list.
- Cameron Hooker, convicted of the Kidnapping of Colleen Stan.
- Charles Jackson, serial killer
- Rick James, musician who served time here between 1994 and 1996.
- Edmund Kemper, the "Co-Ed Killer"; was a serial killer and necrophile active in California in the early 1970s.
- Suge Knight, former owner of Death Row Records.
- Timothy Leary, psychologist and writer.
- Charles Manson, murderer, conspirator
- Brandon Mclnerney (born 1994), murderer of Larry F. King
- Erik Menendez, convicted with his brother Lyle of murdering his parents.
- James Mitose, Japanese-American martial artist who brought the art of Kempo to the United States.
- Ed Morrell, accomplice to the Evans-Sontag railroad robbers of the 1890s.
- Ricky Murdock, rapper known by the stage name Askari X.
- Bobby Purify, original singer of "I'm Your Puppet".
- Shorty Rossi, star of the Animal Planet show Pit Boss.
- Leo Ryan, U.S. Congressman who while an Assemblyman had posed as a prisoner to investigate conditions.
- Frank Shamrock, mixed martial artist
- Glen Sherley, musician.
- Danny Trejo, actor.
- Jack Black, hobo, professional burglar and author of "You Can't Win", in which he describes his almost eight years at the prison.
