= Tennessee State Prison =

Former state prison in Nashville, Tennessee, United States

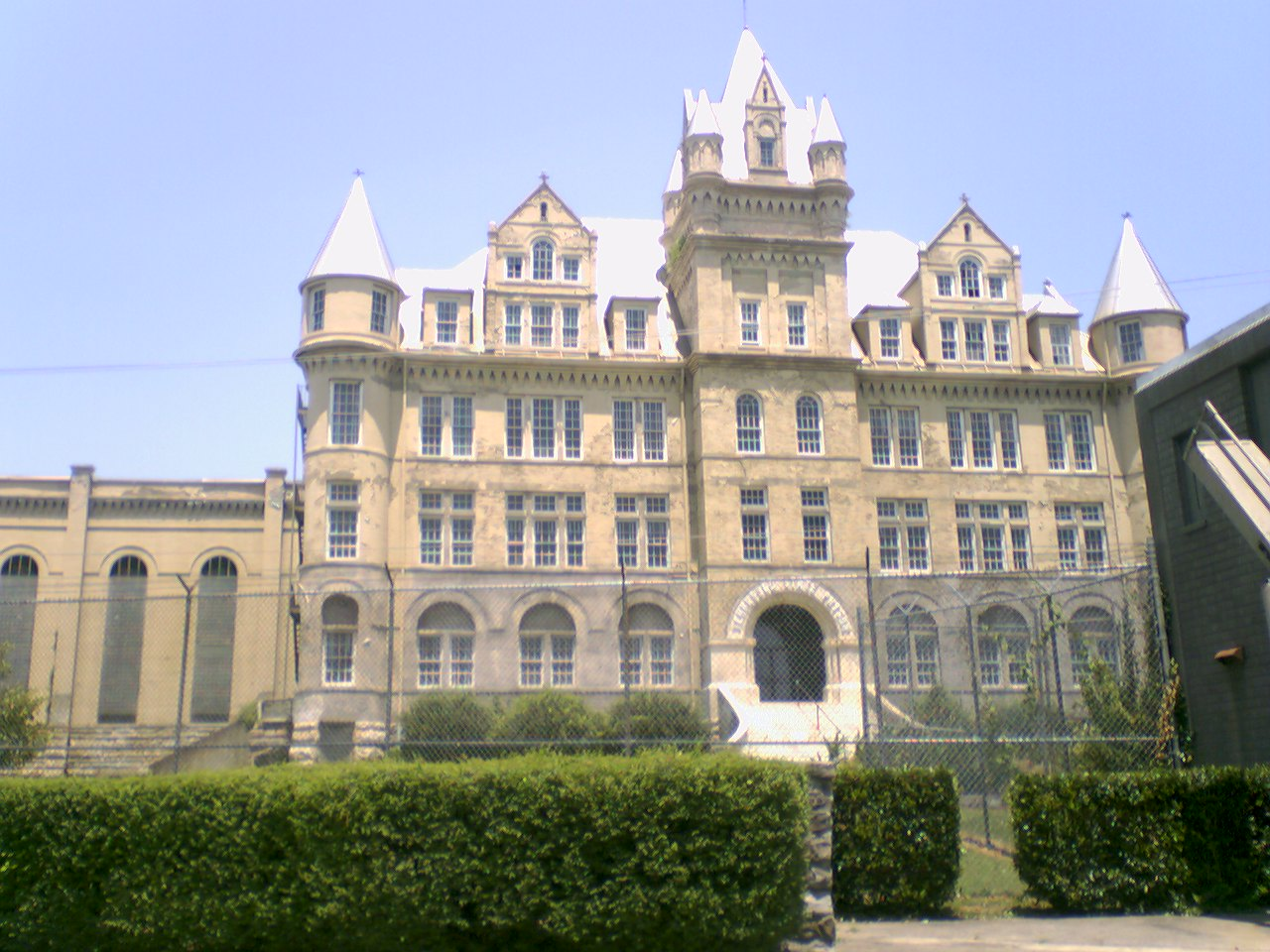
- Main entrance, 2006
- Interactive map of Tennessee State Prison
- Location: Nashville, Tennessee; 36.1772°N 86.8654°W
- Status: Closed 1992
- Security class: High/Medium security
- Capacity: 1,400
- Opened: 1898

Tennessee State Prison is a former correctional facility located six miles west of downtown Nashville, Tennessee, on Centennial Boulevard. It opened in 1898 and has been closed since 1992 because of overcrowding concerns. The facility was severely damaged by an EF3 tornado in the tornado outbreak of March 2–3, 2020.

== History ==
=== First structure (1831–1898) ===
The first Tennessee State Penitentiary, located on what is now 15th Avenue between Church Street and Charlotte Avenue, became operational on January 1, 1831, with 200 cells, a warden's residence, and a hospital. Modeled after the Auburn Penitentiary in both discipline and design, the prison was the first of its kind in Tennessee and the South. Inmates were subject to policies and practices championed by the Auburn model, such as "during the day the prisoners, with downcast eyes, labored silently together in workshops, while at night they slept alone in separate cells. Under no circumstances could they communicate with one another, and only when necessity demanded could they receive letters or calls from relatives and friends." The prison housed both men and women, with the first male inmate registered in 1831 and the first female inmate registered in 1840.

In 1863, the Union Army took control of the penitentiary and used it as a military prison. Under Union occupation, the prison population tripled and conditions worsened. Convicts were leased to the federal government by the Occupation Government of Tennessee to help repay their mounting debts. Among the prisoners held during this time was Mark R. Cockrill, a Confederate sympathizer whose West Nashville property would later be purchased for the construction of the new prison. Following the Civil War, the percentage of black inmates in the state of Tennessee increased dramatically, from roughly 5% of the prison's population prior to the Civil War to about 62% in 1869. The proportion of black women in prison was significantly higher to black men in relation to whites, with all female prisoners in Tennessee in 1868 being African American women.

Every convict was expected to defray a portion of the cost of incarceration by performing physical labor. Inmates worked up to 16 hours a day for meager rations and unheated, unventilated sleeping quarters. The 1840s saw a rise in the use of prison labor, with inmates being employed in the construction of the state capitol building in Nashville. Prison labor was so lucrative that the state prison became a revenue-generating system that came in direct competition with free laborers. The State also contracted with private companies to operate factories inside the prison walls using convict labor. In 1870 the state penitentiary reached a deal with the Tennessee Coal, Iron, and Railroad Company, establishing the first convict-leasing program in the country. This only added to growing frustrations among free laborers who staged a strike against the Tennessee Coal, Iron, and Railroad Company in 1871. Though the effort was ultimately defeated, it was the first of many revolts against the convict-leasing system. The state also contracted with private companies to operate factories inside the prison walls using convict labor.

A women's wing was opened in 1892 but overcrowding soon forced the men and women to be housed together.

=== Second structure (1898–1992) ===
The design for a proposed new prison called for the construction of a Gothic, fortress-like structure. The second Tennessee prison contained 800 small cells, each designed to house a single inmate. In addition, an administration building and other smaller buildings for offices, warehouses, and factories were built within the 20 ft high (6.1 m), 3 ft thick (0.91 m) rock walls. The plan also provided for a working farm outside the walls and mandated a separate system for younger offenders to isolate them from older, hardened criminals. A separate women's wing was built on the northwest corner of the grounds that housed the female inmates who worked on the farm as well.

The new prison was built by Enoch Guy Elliott, who was married to Lady Ida Beasley Elliott, a missionary to Burma. Governor Peter Turney made Enoch Guy Elliott the chief warden of the old prison. Enoch used mostly prison labor to build the new prison.

Construction costs for this second Tennessee State Penitentiary exceeded US$500,000 (US$12.3 million in 2007 dollars), not including the price of the land. The prison's 800 cells opened to receive prisoners on February 12, 1898, and that day admitted 1,403 prisoners, creating immediate overcrowding. To a greater or lesser extent, overcrowding persisted throughout the next century.

The original Tennessee State Penitentiary on Church Street was demolished in 1898, and salvageable materials were used in the construction of outbuildings at the new facility, creating a physical link from 1831 to the present.

At TSP, housing units I-VI are unconscionably overcrowded. Inmates are double celled in tiny cages like so many animals in a zoo, with an average of about 23 square feet in which each man lives, sleeps, performs his bodily functions, and spends a great portion of each day. Beyond the deplorable lack of space, the cells are noisy, poorly lit, often in a state of disrepair and equipped with plumbing that is dangerous to the prisoner's health. These environmental conditions range from bad to shocking, and clearly have a deleterious impact upon the lives of the inmates housed there. Violence at the prison is rampant, including frequent episodes of assault and sexual attack upon cellmates. With the pervasive idleness, inmates have few alternatives but to sit in their tiny cells and brood.
The conclusion is inescapable that TSP units I-VI are inadequate to properly house and provide for the current population. The court finds those units to be so severely overcrowded as to be offensive to any notion of basic human decency. In addition, since overcrowding is a primary cause of all of the most serious problems at TSP, and is in turn made worse by the conditions it causes, the only effective remedy is to reduce the prison's population.

— Chief Judge Morton, Grubbs v. Bradley, 552 F. Supp. 1052, 1126 (M.D. Tenn. 1982)

Several notable incidents have occurred at the second Tennessee State Penitentiary. On August 4, 1902, sixteen prisoners blew out the end of one wing of the prison and escaped; one of the inmates was shot and killed by guards. Two of those who escaped were never recaptured. Later, a group of inmates seized control of the segregated white wing and held it for eighteen hours before surrendering. In 1907 several convicts commandeered a switch engine and drove it through a prison gate. In 1938 inmates staged a mass escape. Several serious fires ignited at the penitentiary, including one that destroyed the main dining room. Riots occurred in 1975 and 1985.

In 1989, the Tennessee Department of Correction opened a new penitentiary, the Riverbend Maximum Security Institution at Nashville. The second Tennessee State Penitentiary closed in June 1992. As part of the settlement in a class action suit, Grubbs v. Bradley (1982), the Federal Court issued a permanent injunction in 1993, prohibiting the Tennessee Department of Correction from ever again housing inmates at the Tennessee State Prison.

After it was closed, the former prison was used as a filming location, but the interior was declared off-limits in 2011 due to asbestos. The building was severely damaged by an EF3 tornado in the tornado outbreak of March 2–3, 2020.

== In media ==
=== Films ===
The following films include scenes that were filmed at the Tennessee State Prison:

- Framed (1975)
- Nashville (1975)
- Marie (1985)
- Ernest Goes to Jail (1990)
- Against the Wall (1994)
- Last Dance (1996)
- A Letter From Death Row (1998)
- The Green Mile (1999)
- The Last Castle (2001)
- Walk the Line (2005)

=== Music ===
- Eric Church, "Lightning" and "Homeboy" (music videos)
- Cage the Elephant, "Cold Cold Cold" (music video)
- Pillar, "Bring Me Down" (music video)

The old penitentiary also was mentioned in Church's "Lightning", released on his 2006 debut album Sinners Like Me. Church's song is about a man who is going to be executed in the electric chair at Farnworth praying to God for forgiveness for committing a murder.

Johnny Cash recorded the live album A Concert Behind Prison Walls there in 1974 with special guests Linda Ronstadt, Roy Clark, and Foster Brooks.

=== Television ===
- Celebrity Paranormal Project filmed there for the third episode of the series (titled "The Warden") as well as the last episode of the first season (titled "Dead Man Walking"). The prison was referred to as "The Walls Maximum Security Prison" in both episodes.

== Gallery ==
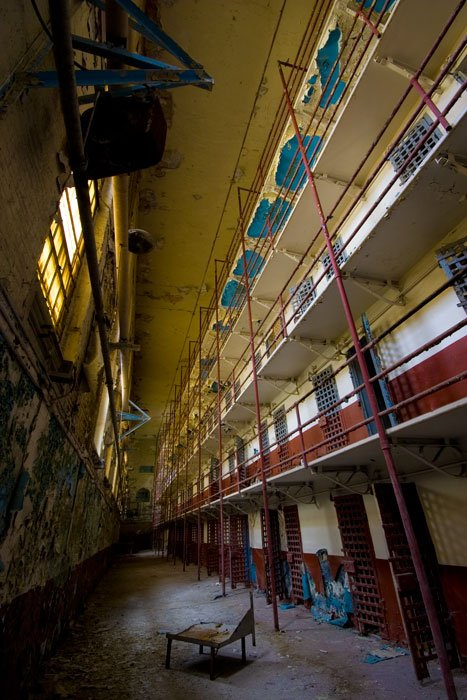
Abandoned cell block

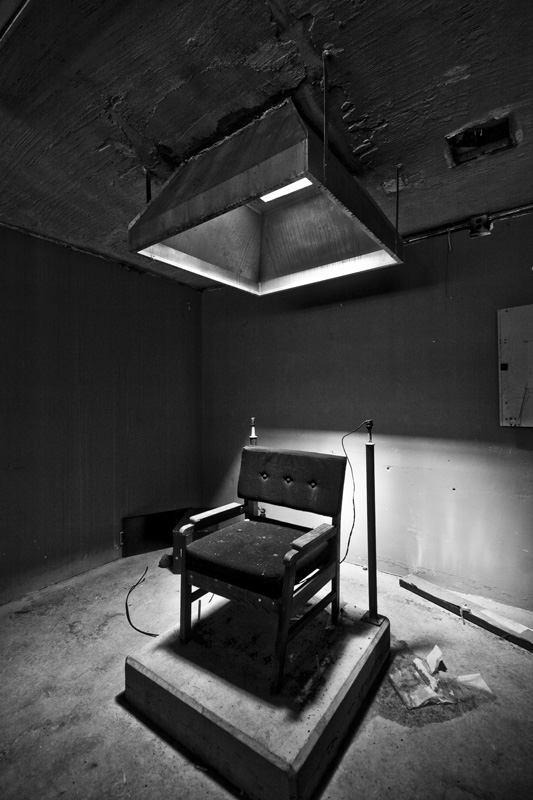
Remains of the electric chair chamber

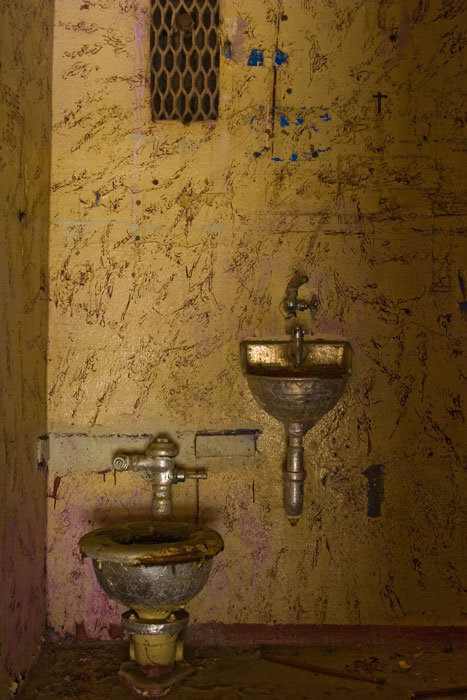
Typical cell facilities
