= Österåker Prison =

Prison in Österåker Municipality, Sweden

- Location in Sweden
- Location: Österåker Municipality, Sweden; 59°31′20″N 18°17′20″E
- Status: Operational
- Security class: Class 2
- Capacity: 93
- Opened: 1969
- Managed by: Swedish Prison and Probation Service, Stockholm Region
- Director: Gunilla Ternert

The Österåker Prison (Swedish: Anstalten Österåker, commonly known as Österåkersanstalten) is a prison located in Österåker Municipality, thirty kilometers north of Stockholm, Sweden. It is a Class 2-security prison with a capacity for 146 inmates. The facility also contains a remand prison with the capacity for 80 inmates.

== History ==
The Österåker Prison was built in 1969 as a replacement for the Långholmen Prison in Stockholm. Since 1976 the prison is concentrated on inmates with different types of abuse problems.

American country singer Johnny Cash performed at the prison on October 3, 1972. The live album På Österåker ("At Österåker"), recorded out of this concert, was released in 1973. Between the songs Cash can be heard speaking Swedish, which is met with roaring approval from the inmates.

== Notable inmates ==
- Christer Pettersson - one of the suspected assassins of Olof Palme, Swedish Prime Minister
- Jan Guillou - famous Swedish author, convicted of espionage.
- John Ausonius - Swedish murderer, bank robber and attempted serial killer, transferred from Kumla Prison in 2012. Extradited to Germany between 2016 and January 2019.
- Jon Nödtveidt - Swedish musician, convicted of the murder of Josef ben Meddour in Keillers Park murder case.
- Miro Barešić - Croatian nationalist, convicted of the murder of Vladimir Rolović in the 1971 Yugoslav Embassy shooting
- Oussama Kassir - convicted on illegal firearm charges in Sweden, later on terrorism charges in the United States.
