= A Boy Named Sue =

Song by Shel Silverstein, Johnny Cash

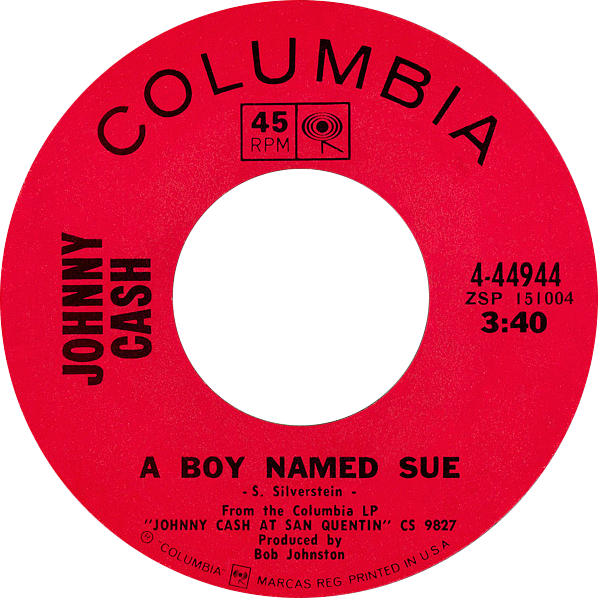
- Side A of 1969 US single

Single by Johnny Cash

from the album At San Quentin
- B-side: "San Quentin"
- Released: July 2, 1969
- Recorded: February 24, 1969
- Genre: Country; talking blues
- Length: 3:44
- Label: Columbia
- Songwriter: Shel Silverstein
- Producer: Bob Johnston

Johnny Cash singles chronology
"Daddy Sang Bass" (1968)	"A Boy Named Sue" (1969)	"Get Rhythm" (1969)

Alternative cover
- Artwork for Dutch single

"Boy Named Sue"

Promotional single by Shel Silverstein

from the album Boy Named Sue (and His Other Country Songs)
- B-side: "Somebody Stole My Rig"
- Released: 1969
- Label: RCA Victor
- Songwriter: Shel Silverstein
- Producers: Chet Atkins, Felton Jarvis

"A Boy Named Sue" is a song written by Shel Silverstein and made famous by Johnny Cash. Cash recorded the song live in concert on February 24, 1969, at California's San Quentin State Prison for his At San Quentin album. Cash also performed the song (with comical variations on the original performance) in December 1969 at Madison Square Garden. The live San Quentin version of the song became Cash's biggest hit on the Billboard Hot 100 chart and his only top ten single there, spending three weeks at No. 2 in 1969, held out of the top spot by "Honky Tonk Women" by The Rolling Stones. The track also topped the Billboard Hot Country Songs and Easy Listening charts that same year and was certified Gold on August 14, 1969, by the RIAA.

Silverstein's recording was released the same year as "Boy Named Sue", a single from the RCA Victor album Boy Named Sue (and His Other Country Songs), produced by Chet Atkins and Felton Jarvis.

== Content ==
The song tells the tale of a young man's quest for revenge on a father who abandoned him at three years of age and whose only contribution to his entire life was giving him a guitar and naming him Sue, commonly a feminine name, which results in the young man suffering from ridicule and harassment by everyone he meets. Ashamed of his name, he becomes a hard-hearted nomad as a young man; he swears that he will find and kill his father for giving him "that awful name".

Sue later locates his father at a tavern one summer day in Gatlinburg, Tennessee, and after recognizing him by the scar on his cheek and his evil eye confronts him by saying, "My name is Sue! How do you do? Now you're gonna die!" This results in a vicious brawl that spills outdoors into a muddy street. As the two pull their guns on each other, Sue's father smiles with pride and admits that he is the man ("son of a bitch" in the Johnny Cash version) that named him Sue. Because Sue's father knew that he would not be there for his son, he gave him the name as an act of tough love, believing (correctly) that the ensuing ridicule would force him to "get tough or die". Learning this, Sue makes peace and reconciles with his father. Sue closes the song conceding his father's point of view, but that if he ever has a son, he will name the boy "Bill, or George, any damn thing but Sue" because he "still hate(s) that name."

== Structure ==
The song has an unusual AABCCB rhyme scheme, broken only to mark the midpoint and end. The song is performed mostly in the speech-like style of talking blues rather than conventional singing.

== Censorship ==
The term "son of a bitch" in the line "I'm the son of a bitch that named you Sue!" was bleeped out in the Johnny Cash version both on the single and the At San Quentin album and the final line was also edited to remove the word "damn". Both the edited and unedited versions are available on various albums and compilations. The term "son of a bitch" was edited to "son of a gun" or altogether bleeped out in some versions. When performing the song live in later performances (such as in April 1970 at the White House and in 1994 at the Glastonbury Festival, for example), Cash would himself utter a bleep-censor sound instead of the word. The unedited version of the original San Quentin performance is included on later reissues of the At San Quentin album and Cash's posthumous The Legend of Johnny Cash album. Silverstein does not utter any profanity in his original version, with Sue's father instead identifying himself as the "heartless hound" that named him Sue.

== Inspiration ==
The core story of the song may have been inspired by humorist Jean Shepherd, a close friend of Silverstein, who was often taunted as a child because of his feminine-sounding name.

The song might also have been inspired by the male attorney Sue K. Hicks of Madisonville, Tennessee, a friend of John Scopes who agreed to be a prosecutor in what was to become known as the "Scopes Monkey Trial". Hicks was named after his mother, who died giving birth to him. Cash sent two autographed albums and photos of himself, all signed "To Sue, how do you do?"

In his autobiography, Cash wrote that he had just received the song and only read over it a couple of times. It was included in that concert to try it out—he did not know the words, and he can be seen regularly referring to a piece of paper on the filmed recording. Cash was surprised at how well the song went over with the audience. The rough, spontaneous performance with sparse accompaniment was included in the Johnny Cash At San Quentin album, ultimately becoming one of Cash's biggest hits. According to Cash biographer Robert Hilburn, neither the British TV crew filming the concert nor his band knew he planned to perform the song; he used a lyric sheet on stage while Carl Perkins and the band improvised the backing on the spot. While another song, "San Quentin", was expected to be the significant new song featured in the concert and subsequent album (so much so the album includes two performances of "San Quentin"), "A Boy Named Sue" ended up being the concert's major find.

Cash also performed it on his musical variety show, ending the song with the line, "And if I ever have a son, I think I'm gonna name him... John Carter Cash", referring to his newborn son. Cash also performed this variant at the White House in April 1970; in later years, however, he would restore the original "any name but Sue" ending, but change the wording to "if I ever have another son". When Cash performed with The Highwaymen in the 1980s and 1990s, he would end the song by saying, "if I ever have another boy, I think I'm gonna name him Waylon, or Willie, or Kris." referring to bandmates Waylon Jennings, Willie Nelson, and Kris Kristofferson.

According to Shel Silverstein's biographer Mitch Myers, June Carter Cash encouraged her husband to perform the song. Silverstein introduced it to them at what they called a "Guitar Pull," where musicians would pass a guitar around and play their songs.

Silverstein later wrote a follow-up named "The Father of a Boy Named Sue" in his 1978 Songs and Stories in which he tells the old man's point of view of the story. The only known recording of the song by a major artist is by Shel Silverstein himself. Various cover artists have covered this song since then.

Cash performed the song at the Nixon White House in 1970, at the request of an aide.

At the 12th Annual Grammy Awards in 1970, Cash won the "Best Country Vocal Performance, Male" award and Silverstein won "Best Country Song" for the song.

== Charts ==
=== Weekly charts ===
Chart (1969)	Peak position
Australia (Go-Set)	2
Canada Top Singles (RPM)	3
Canada Country Singles (RPM)	1
Canada Adult Contemporary (RPM)	1
Ireland (IRMA)	3
Netherlands (Single Top 100)	13
South Africa	13
UK Singles (Official Charts)	4
US Billboard Hot Country Singles	1
US Billboard Hot 100	2
US Billboard Hot Adult Contemporary Tracks	1
US Cash Box Top 100	2

=== Year-end charts ===
Chart (1969)	Rank
Canada	49
US Billboard Hot 100	36
US Adult Contemporary (Billboard)	40
US Cash Box	34

== Certifications ==
Region	Certification	Certified units/sales
United Kingdom (BPI)	Silver	200,000^{‡}
United States (RIAA)	Gold	1,000,000^{^}
^{^} Shipments figures based on certification alone.^{‡} Sales+streaming figures based on certification alone.

== Impact on popular culture ==
A number of parodies and covers of the song appeared in 1970. American–French artist Joe Dassin covered the song on his fourth studio album, released in 1970, as "Un Garçon Nommé Suzy"; the lyrics were translated to French by Pierre Delanoë. Comedian Martin Mull wrote a parody titled A Girl Named Johnny Cash which was recorded in 1970 by Jane Morgan and reached No. 61 on Billboard's country charts. MAD Magazine issue No. 137 (September 1970) included a parody titled A Boy Dog Named Lassie, based on the fact that the Lassie movies and TV series employed male Collies in the female title role.

The gender-bending implications of the title have been adapted to explore issues of sex and gender, another use of the popular song title that goes beyond its original scope. The 2001 documentary A Boy Named Sue features a transgender protagonist and uses the song in the soundtrack. A Boy Named Sue: Gender and Country Music is the title of a 2004 book about the role of gender in American country music.

Big John Bates did an uptempo cover of the song for a Johnny Cash compilation record in 2009.
