= A Johnny Cash Portrait: His Greatest Hits Volume II =

Greatest hits album by Johnny Cash
- Released: September 1971
- Recorded: August 8, 1958–July 10, 1970
- Genres: Country; rock and roll; rockabilly
- Length: 29:38
- Label: Columbia
- Producers: Don Law; Frank Jones; Bob Johnston

Johnny Cash chronology
| Man in Black (1971) | A Johnny Cash Portrait: His Greatest Hits Volume II (1971) | Sunday Morning Coming Down (1972) |

A Johnny Cash Portrait: His Greatest Hits Volume II, also called The Johnny Cash Collection, is a greatest hits compilation by country singer Johnny Cash, released on Columbia Records in 1971. It combines re-recordings of older songs from Cash's years with Sun Records (such as "Hey Porter" and "Folsom Prison Blues") with more recent hits like "A Boy Named Sue" from Cash's At San Quentin album and the Kris Kristofferson-penned "Sunday Mornin' Comin' Down". The album was certified Gold in 2000 and Platinum in 2003 by the RIAA.

== Track listing ==
| No. | Title | Writer(s) | Original album | Length |
|---|---|---|---|---|
| 1. | "A Boy Named Sue" (Live at San Quentin State Prison, February 24, 1969) | Shel Silverstein | Johnny Cash at San Quentin | 3:41 |
| 2. | "Hey Porter (re-recording)" | Johnny Cash | I Walk the Line | 2:19 |
| 3. | "Guess Things Happen That Way (re-recording)" | Jack Clement | Happiness Is You | 1:53 |
| 4. | "Blistered" | Billy Ed Wheeler | Hello, I'm Johnny Cash | 2:22 |
| 5. | "Big River (re-recording)" | Johnny Cash | I Walk the Line | 2:18 |
| 6. | "Long Legged Guitar Pickin' Man" | Marshall Grant | Carryin' On with Johnny Cash & June Carter | 2:34 |
| 7. | "Folsom Prison Blues (re-recording)" (Live at Folsom State Prison, January 13, 1968) | Johnny Cash | Johnny Cash at Folsom Prison | 2:45 |
| 8. | "Sunday Mornin' Comin' Down" | Kris Kristofferson | The Johnny Cash Show | 4:08 |
| 9. | "If I Were a Carpenter" | Tim Hardin | Hello, I'm Johnny Cash | 3:00 |
| 10. | "Frankie's Man Johnny" | Johnny Cash | The Fabulous Johnny Cash | 2:15 |
| 11. | "Daddy Sang Bass" | Carl Perkins | The Holy Land | 2:23 |

== Charts ==
| Chart (1971) | Peak position |
|---|---|
| US Top LP's (Billboard) | 94 |
| US Hot Country LP's (Billboard) | 5 |
