= Hang On to a Dream: The Verve Recordings =

Compilation album by Tim Hardin
- Released: February 22, 1994
- Recorded: 1964–1966
- Genre: Folk
- Length: 134:07
- Label: Polydor
- Producer: Erik Jacobsen, Charles Koppelman, Don Rubin

Tim Hardin chronology
Reason to Believe (The Best of) (1990)	Hang On to a Dream: The Verve Recordings (1994)	Simple Songs of Freedom: The Tim Hardin Collection (1996)

Hang On to a Dream: The Verve Recordings is a compilation album by folk artist Tim Hardin, released in 1994. It includes all Hardin's studio recordings for the Verve label as well as alternate takes, unreleased tracks, and demos.

The songs include all tracks from the albums Tim Hardin 1, Tim Hardin 2 and Tim Hardin 4 (last track not included), the latter a release of demos done by Hardin for Columbia in 1964 which were ultimately rejected at that time.

== Reception ==
Professional ratings
Review scores
Source	Rating
Allmusic	4.5/5 stars
No Depression	(no rating)
Encyclopedia of Popular Music	5/5 stars

Writing for Allmusic, music critic Richie Unterberger's review referred to Hardin's "expressive, blues-inflected vocals and confessional songwriting..." In his review for No Depression, critic John Morthland wrote "The pain was palpable in nearly every word Tim Hardin sang, and the pleasure didn't feel all that much better... That said, Hardin can be hard to take for long — junkie self-pity, which eventually gets tedious, was never far from even his greatest efforts — and two full discs (including demos) is likely too much of a good thing. But everybody should hear at least some Hardin..."

== Track listing ==
All songs by Tim Hardin unless otherwise noted.

=== Disc one ===
1. "Don't Make Promises" – 2:23
2. "Green Rocky Road" – 2:16
3. "Smugglin' Man" – 1:54
4. "How Long" – 4:33
5. "While You're on Your Way" – 2:14
6. "It'll Never Happen Again" – 2:34
7. "Reason to Believe" – 1:57
8. "Never Too Far" – 2:12
9. "Part of the Wind" – 2:15
10. "Ain't Gonna Do Without" – 3:40
11. "Misty Roses" – 1:57
12. "How Can We Hang On to a Dream?" – 2:01
13. "If I Were a Carpenter" – 2:40
14. "Red Balloon" – 2:32
15. "Black Sheep Boy" – 1:53
16. "The Lady Came from Baltimore" – 1:48
17. "Baby Close Its Eyes" – 1:51
18. "You Upset the Grace of Living When You Lie" – 1:45
19. "Speak Like a Child" – 3:13
20. "See Where You Are and Get Out" – 1:10
21. "It's Hard to Believe in Love for Long" – 2:15
22. "Tribute to Hank Williams" – 3:08
23. "While You're on Your Way" (alternate take) – 2:34
24. "It'll Never Happen Again" (alternate take) – 2:06

=== Disc two ===
1. "Airmobile" – 2:19
2. "Whiskey, Whiskey" – 5:39
3. "Seventh Son" (Willie Dixon) – 2:05
4. "Danville Dame" – 2:46
5. "House of the Rising Sun" (Traditional) – 3:39
6. "Bo Diddley (McDaniel) 2:52
7. "I Can't Slow Down" – 2:28
8. "Hello Baby" – 5:20
9. "Rolling Stone" (Muddy Waters) – 2:38
10. "You Got a Reputation" – 2:26
11. "Keep Your Hands Off Her" (Traditional) – 3:00
12. "Nobody Knows You When You're Down and Out" (Jimmy Cox) – 4:03
13. "(I'm Your) Hoochie Coochie Man" (Dixon) – 5:02
14. "So Glad You're Mine" (Arthur Crudup) – 4:02
15. "You Can't Judge a Book" (Dixon) – 3:13
16. "She Ain't Home" – 2:17
17. "You Say You Love Me" – 2:10
18. "How Time Flies" – 3:45
19. "You Can Ruin a Man" – 2:31
20. "If I Knew" – 2:41
21. "She's Up to Something New" – 4:04
22. "Who'll Be the Man" (Traditional) – 2:01
23. "First Love Song" – 3:54

== Personnel ==
- Tim Hardin – vocals, guitar, piano
- Gary Burton – vibraphone
- Bob Bushnell – bass
- Phil Kraus – vibraphone
- Earl Palmer – drums
- Felix Pappalardi – bass
- Walter Yost – bass
- Buddy Saltzman – drums
- Sticks Evans – drums
- John Sebastian – harmonica

Production notes:

- Erik Jacobsen – producer
- Don Rubin – producer
- Charles Koppelman – producer
- Artie Butler – string arrangements
- Lisa Law – photography
- David Gahr – photography
- Bill Levenson – executive producer
- Dan Loggins – associate producer
- Jerry Rappaport – compilation producer
- Terri Tierney – coordination
- Colin Escott – liner notes
