= The Essential Johnny Cash (2002 album) =

Greatest hits album by Johnny Cash
- Released: February 2002
- Recorded: September 1954 – May 1993
- Genres: Country; outlaw country; gospel
- Length: 103:53
- Labels: Legacy; Columbia
- Producers: Sam Phillips; Jack Clement; Don Law; Frank Jones; Bob Johnston; Johnny Cash; Charlie Bragg; Brian Ahern; Earl Ball; Flood; Brian Eno; The Edge

Johnny Cash chronology
| Return to the Promised Land (2000) | The Essential Johnny Cash (2002) | 20th Century Masters – The Millennium Collection: The Best of Johnny Cash (2002) |

Professional ratings
Review scores
| Source | Rating |
|---|---|
| AllMusic | 4.5/5 stars |
| Tom Hull | A |
| The Rolling Stone Album Guide | 4/5 stars |

The Essential Johnny Cash is a double-compact disc compilation by Johnny Cash released as part of Sony BMG's Essential series. It was compiled to commemorate Cash's 70th birthday. It is not to be confused with the three-CD box set of the same name released by Columbia Records in 1992.

The double album concentrates mainly on Cash's first 15 years as a recording artist with Sun Records and Columbia, contains only eight post-1970 selections, and no selections from Cash's work with Rick Rubin for American Recordings: Cash's final hit single, a cover of Nine Inch Nails' "Hurt", was released ten months later. The album was certified gold and platinum on February 5, 2005 and was certified 3× platinum on March 3, 2016 for sales of 1,500,000 copies by the RIAA. It has sold 1,845,400 copies in the US as of October 2019.

Amongst the 36 tracks on the compilation are two songs that feature Cash prominently but are from other artists' albums: "Girl from the North Country" from Bob Dylan's 1969 album Nashville Skyline, and "The Wanderer" from U2's 1993 album Zooropa, which makes its first appearance on an American Johnny Cash album with this release.

As a tribute to Cash's influence on country, rock, and other modern musics and his wide fan base, the liner notes feature testimonials and 70th birthday greetings from an array of artists – from friends and collaborators like Willie Nelson, Kris Kristofferson, Tom Petty, ex-stepson-in-law Nick Lowe, and wife June Carter Cash, and also from Keith Richards, Elvis Costello, Corey Taylor and Shawn Crahan of Slipknot, Metallica's Kirk Hammett, and Henry Rollins.

== Track listing ==
All tracks are written by Johnny Cash, except where noted.

Disc one
| No. | Title | Writer(s) | Album | Length |
|---|---|---|---|---|
| 1. | "Hey Porter" | | single B-side (1955) | 2:13 |
| 2. | "Cry! Cry! Cry!" | | single A-side (1955) | 2:23 |
| 3. | "I Walk the Line" | | single A-side (1956) and Johnny Cash with His Hot and Blue Guitar! (1957) | 2:43 |
| 4. | "Get Rhythm" | | single B-side (1956) | 2:13 |
| 5. | "There You Go" | | single A-side (1956) | 2:17 |
| 6. | "Ballad of a Teenage Queen" | Jack Clement | single A-side (1957) and Johnny Cash Sings the Songs That Made Him Famous (1958) | 2:11 |
| 7. | "Big River" | | Johnny Cash Sings the Songs That Made Him Famous | 2:31 |
| 8. | "Guess Things Happen That Way" | Jack Clement | single A-side (1957) and Johnny Cash Sings the Songs That Made Him Famous | 1:49 |
| 9. | "All Over Again" | | single A-side (1958) | 2:12 |
| 10. | "Don't Take Your Guns to Town" | | The Fabulous Johnny Cash (1958) | 3:02 |
| 11. | "Five Feet High and Rising" | | Songs of Our Soil (1959) | 1:46 |
| 12. | "The Rebel – Johnny Yuma" | Richard Markowitz; Andrew Fenady | single A-side (1961) | 1:52 |
| 13. | "Tennessee Flat Top Box" | | single A-side (1961) | 2:58 |
| 14. | "I Still Miss Someone" | Johnny Cash; Roy Cash Jr. | The Fabulous Johnny Cash (1958) | 2:34 |
| 15. | "Ring of Fire" | June Carter; Merle Kilgore | Ring of Fire: The Best of Johnny Cash (1963) | 2:35 |
| 16. | "The Ballad of Ira Hayes" | Peter LaFarge | Bitter Tears: Ballads of the American Indian (1964) | 4:07 |
| 17. | "Orange Blossom Special" | E.T. Rouse | Orange Blossom Special (1965) | 3:06 |
| 18. | "Were You There (When They Crucified My Lord)" (with The Carter Family) | traditional, arranged by Johnny Cash | single B-side (1962) | 3:51 |

Disc two
| No. | Title | Writer(s) | Album | Length |
|---|---|---|---|---|
| 1. | "It Ain't Me, Babe" (with June Carter Cash) | Bob Dylan | Orange Blossom Special (1965) | 3:03 |
| 2. | "The One on the Right Is on the Left" | Jack Clement | Everybody Loves a Nut (1966) | 2:47 |
| 3. | "Jackson" (with June Carter Cash) | Gaby Rodgers; Billy Edd Wheeler | Carryin' On with Johnny Cash & June Carter (1967) | 2:44 |
| 4. | "Folsom Prison Blues" (Live) | | At Folsom Prison (1968) | 2:44 |
| 5. | "Daddy Sang Bass" | Carl Perkins | The Holy Land (1969) | 2:20 |
| 6. | "Girl from the North Country" (with Bob Dylan) | Bob Dylan | Nashville Skyline (1969) | 3:42 |
| 7. | "A Boy Named Sue" (Live) | Shel Silverstein | At San Quentin (1969) | 3:46 |
| 8. | "If I Were a Carpenter" (with June Carter Cash) | Tim Hardin | Hello, I'm Johnny Cash (1969) | 2:59 |
| 9. | "Sunday Mornin' Comin' Down" | Kris Kristofferson | The Johnny Cash Show (1970) | 4:09 |
| 10. | "Flesh and Blood" | | I Walk the Line soundtrack (1970) | 2:36 |
| 11. | "Man in Black" | | Man in Black (1971) | 2:52 |
| 12. | "Ragged Old Flag" | | Ragged Old Flag (1974) | 3:09 |
| 13. | "One Piece at a Time" | Wayne Kemp | One Piece at a Time (1976) | 4:01 |
| 14. | "(Ghost) Riders in the Sky" | Stan Jones | Silver (1979) | 3:44 |
| 15. | "Song of the Patriot" (with Marty Robbins) | Marty Robbins; Shirl Milete | Encore (1980) | 3:24 |
| 16. | "Highwayman" (with Willie Nelson, Waylon Jennings, and Kris Kristofferson as The Highwaymen) | Jimmy Webb | Highwayman (1985) | 3:03 |
| 17. | "The Night Hank Williams Came to Town" (with Waylon Jennings) | Bobby Braddock; Charlie Williams | Johnny Cash Is Coming to Town (1987) | 3:24 |
| 18. | "The Wanderer" (with U2) | Bono; The Edge; Larry Mullen Jr.; Adam Clayton | Zooropa (1993) | 4:43 |

Disc three (3.0 version only)
| No. | Title | Writer(s) | Album | Length |
|---|---|---|---|---|
| 1. | "What Do I Care" | | single B-side (1958) | 2:09 |
| 2. | "I Got Stripes" | | single B-side (1959) | 2:05 |
| 3. | "Understand Your Man" | | I Walk the Line (1964) | 2:44 |
| 4. | "What Is Truth" | | single A-side (1970) | 2:39 |
| 5. | "Oney" | Jerry Chesnut | single A-side (1972) and Any Old Wind That Blows (1973) | 3:06 |
| 6. | "Any Old Wind That Blows" | Deena Kaye Rose | Any Old Wind That Blows | 2:47 |
| 7. | "A Thing Called Love" | Jerry Hubbard | A Thing Called Love (1972) | 2:34 |
| 8. | "Without Love" | Nick Lowe | Rockabilly Blues (1981) | 2:29 |

== 2015 vinyl reissue ==
A vinyl edition of The Essential Johnny Cash was released in 2015 as a double LP. The vinyl release reduces the track list to 28 songs, compared to the 36 on the standard CD release.

Side A
| No. | Title | Writer(s) | Length |
|---|---|---|---|
| 1. | "Hey Porter" | Johnny Cash | 2:14 |
| 2. | "Cry! Cry! Cry!" | Johnny Cash | 2:24 |
| 3. | "I Walk the Line" | Johnny Cash | 2:44 |
| 4. | "Get Rhythm" | Johnny Cash | 2:14 |
| 5. | "There You Go" | Johnny Cash | 2:17 |
| 6. | "Ballad of a Teenage Queen" | Jack Clement | 2:11 |
| 7. | "Big River" | Johnny Cash | 2:31 |
| 8. | "Guess Things Happen That Way" | Jack Clement | 1:50 |

Side B
| No. | Title | Writer(s) | Length |
|---|---|---|---|
| 1. | "All Over Again" | Johnny Cash |
| 2. | "Don't Take Your Guns to Town" | Johnny Cash |
| 3. | "Five Feet High and Rising" | Johnny Cash |
| 4. | "The Rebel - Johnny Yuma" | Richard Markowitz / Andrew Fenady |
| 5. | "Tennessee Flat Top Box" | Johnny Cash |
| 6. | "I Still Miss Someone" | Johnny Cash/Roy Cash Jr. |
| 7. | "Ring of Fire" | June Carter/Merle Kilgore |

Side C
| No. | Title | Writer(s) | Length |
|---|---|---|---|
| 1. | "The Ballad of Ira Hayes" | Peter LaFarge |
| 2. | "Orange Blossom Special" | E.T. Rouse |
| 3. | "It Ain't Me Babe" (with June Carter Cash) | Bob Dylan |
| 4. | "The One on the Right is on the Left" | Jack Clement |
| 5. | "Jackson" (with June Carter Cash) | Jerry Leiber [as Gaby Rodgers]/Billy Edd Wheeler |
| 6. | "Folsom Prison Blues" (Live) | Johnny Cash |

Side D
| No. | Title | Writer(s) | Length |
|---|---|---|---|
| 1. | "Daddy Sang Bass" | Carl Perkins |
| 2. | "Girl From the North Country" (with Bob Dylan) | Bob Dylan |
| 3. | "A Boy Named Sue" (Live) | Shel Silverstein |
| 4. | "If I Were a Carpenter" (with June Carter Cash) | Tim Hardin |
| 5. | "Sunday Morning Coming Down" | Kris Kristofferson |
| 6. | "Man in Black" | Johnny Cash |
| 7. | "One Piece at a Time" | Wayne Kemp |

== Testimonials ==
The following people provided testimonials and/or 70th birthday greetings for the CD's liner notes (in this order):

- June Carter Cash
- Willie Nelson
- Kris Kristofferson
- Merle Haggard
- George Jones
- Rosanne Cash
- Rodney Crowell
- Paul McCartney
- Bono (of U2)
- The Edge (of U2)
- Leonard Cohen
- John Mellencamp
- Raul Malo (of The Mavericks)
- Dave Matthews
- Tom Waits
- Chrissie Hynde
- Keith Richards
- Tom Petty
- Elvis Costello
- Ray Davies
- Nick Lowe
- Sam Shepard
- Billy Bob Thornton
- Matt McDonough (of Mudvayne)
- Shawn Crahan (of Slipknot)
- Corey Taylor (of Slipknot and Stone Sour)
- Kirk Hammett (of Metallica)
- Henry Rollins
- Shelby Lynne
- Al Gore
- Nick Cave
- Trisha Yearwood
- Steve Earle
- Tim Robbins

== Charts ==
=== Weekly charts ===
| Chart (2002–2013) | Peak position |
|---|---|
| US Billboard 200 | 35 |
| US Top Country Albums (Billboard) | 16 |

=== Year-end charts ===
| Chart (2003) | Position |
|---|---|
| US Top Country Albums (Billboard) | 64 |
| Chart (2017) | Position |
| US Top Country Albums (Billboard) | 52 |
| Chart (2018) | Position |
| US Top Country Albums (Billboard) | 81 |
| Chart (2020) | Position |
| US Top Country Albums (Billboard) | 24 |
| Chart (2021) | Position |
| US Top Country Albums (Billboard) | 38 |

== Certifications ==
| Region | Certification | Certified units/sales |
|---|---|---|
| Australia (ARIA) | 4× Platinum | 280,000^{^} |
| Canada (Music Canada) | 2× Platinum | 200,000^{‡} |
| United Kingdom (BPI) | Gold | 100,000^{‡} |
| United States (RIAA) | 3× Platinum | 1,845,400 |
^{^} Shipments figures based on certification alone.^{‡} Sales+streaming figures based on certification alone.
