= The Best of Tim Hardin =

Greatest hits album by Tim Hardin
- Released: 1969
- Recorded: 1966–1967
- Genre: Folk
- Label: Verve (FTS3078)
- Producer: Erik Jacobsen

Tim Hardin chronology
| Tim Hardin 4 (1969) | The Best of Tim Hardin (1969) | Suite for Susan Moore and Damion: We Are One, One, All in One (1969) |

The Best of Tim Hardin is a compilation album by folk artist Tim Hardin, released in 1969. All the songs are taken from Tim Hardin 1 and Tim Hardin 2.

The album was released again in 1974 on the Archetypes label and is out of print although all the songs are available on other Hardin compilations.

Professional ratings
Review scores
| Source | Rating |
|---|---|
| Allmusic | 3/5 stars |

== Track listing ==
All songs by Tim Hardin unless otherwise noted.

=== Side one ===
1. "Don't Make Promises" 2:22
2. "It'll Never Happen Again" 2:35
3. "Tribute to Hank Williams" 3:10
4. "Misty Roses" 1:59
5. "How Can We Hang On To a Dream" 2:06

=== Side two ===
1. "If I Were a Carpenter" 2:41
2. "Reason to Believe" 1:59
3. "Black Sheep Boy" 1:58
4. "Red Balloon" 2:37
5. "Smugglin' Man" 1:56
6. "Lady Came from Baltimore" 1:49

== Personnel ==
- Tim Hardin – vocals, guitar
