= The Homecoming Concert =

Live album by Tim Hardin
- Released: 1981
- Recorded: January 17, 1980
- Venue: The Community Center for the Performing Arts, Eugene, OR
- Genre: Folk
- Length: 39:10
- Label: Line Records, Germany (LICD 9.00040)
- Producer: Phil Freeman

Tim Hardin chronology
The Shock of Grace (1981)	The Homecoming Concert (1981)	Reason to Believe (1990)

The Homecoming Concert is a live album by Tim Hardin, released in 1981. It was recorded on January 17, 1980 in the city where he was born, Eugene, Oregon. Hardin died later that year.

== Background ==
Hardin had moved back to Seattle, Washington after living in England for a number of years. He performed infrequently and continued to struggle with his heroin addiction. A television special called The Homecoming Concert was filmed that included performances and interviews. Hardin died later that year, on December 29, 1980 of a drug overdose.

== Reception ==
Professional ratings
Review scores
Source	Rating
Allmusic	4/5 stars

In an uncredited review for Allmusic, the album was called "eminently rewarding" and "It shows that Hardin, who was at work on a new album at the time of his death, was the owner of a musical fire that was still burning brightly at that late date."

== Track listing ==
All songs by Tim Hardin except where noted.

1. "Black Sheep Boy" – 2:30
2. "Misty Roses" – 3:00
3. "Reason to Believe" – 2:37
4. "Lady Came from Baltimore" – 2:18
5. "Old Blue Jeans" – 3:46
6. "Hang on to a Dream" – 3:11
7. "If I Were a Carpenter" – 4:00
8. "Tribute to Hank Williams" – 3:49
9. "Smugglin' Man" – 2:10
10. "Speak Like a Child" – 2:31
11. "Red Balloon" – 2:33
12. "Amen" (Traditional) – 3:12

== Personnel ==
- Tim Hardin – vocals, guitar, piano
- Phil Freeman – producer
- Lori Borgman – photography
- Jennifer Luttow – design
