= Tim Hardin 3 Live in Concert =

Live album by Tim Hardin
- Released: November 1968
- Recorded: April 10, 1968
- Venue: The Town Hall, New York City
- Genre: Folk
- Length: 69:39
- Label: Verve Forecast
- Producer: Gary Klein

Tim Hardin chronology
This is Tim Hardin (1967)	Tim Hardin 3 Live in Concert (1968)	Tim Hardin 4 (1969)

Tim Hardin 3 Live in Concert is a live album by folk artist Tim Hardin, released in 1968. It was re-issued on CD in 1995 by Polydor, and in 2006 by Lilith Record with four bonus tracks.

== Reception ==
Professional ratings
Review scores
Source	Rating
Allmusic	4.5/5 stars
Rolling Stone	(neutral)

In his review for Allmusic, music critic Richie Unterberger wrote "The support crew is a bit tentative; it's evident that they hadn't played much with Hardin, and in places the tempo comes close to breaking down. It's still a good, effective performance; Hardin is in good voice (a condition which apparently couldn't be readily counted on, even in his early days), and on the songs that had already been released on his first two albums, the arrangements vary from the recorded versions in interesting fashions."

However, according to vibraphonist Mike Mainieri, the musicians had played with Hardin extensively:

In fact, Bernhardt, Donald and I moved up to Woodstock to be next to the talented poet and singer-songwriter and rehearsed with him constantly. I personally had played with Tim on and off for about two years.

The problem we encountered at the Town Hall performance, and in many of Tim's concerts, was that Tim was completely strung out which made his performances so inconsistent.

In musical terms, one never knew if Tim was going to add one bar or two to a phrase or skip a beat, or completely miss a verse or a chorus.

On this particular night at Town Hall, Tim was in terrible shape and what seemed like hesitancy on the part of us 'jazz' musicians was the result of us having to guess when he would strike the next chord or suddenly move to another section of the song.

We played his music hundreds of times over the years and knew the music intimately.

== Track listing ==
All songs by Tim Hardin.

1. "The Lady Came from Baltimore" – 2:40
2. "Reason to Believe" – 2:42
3. "You Upset the Grace of Living When You Lie" – 4:27
4. "Misty Roses" – 4:47
5. "Turn the Page" – 3:21 [*]
6. "Black Sheep Boy" – 2:15
7. "Lenny's Tune" – 6:57
8. "Don't Make Promises" – 4:10
9. "Danville Dame" – 6:29
10. "If I Were a Carpenter" – 3:41
11. "Red Balloon" – 3:33
12. "Tribute to Hank Williams" – 4:03
13. "Smugglin' Man" – 3:43
14. "If I Knew" – 4:48 [*]
15. "Last Sweet Moment" – 7:22 [*]
16. "First Love Song" – 4:32 [*]
- [*] denotes bonus tracks.

== Personnel ==
- Tim Hardin – vocals, guitar, piano on "Lenny's Tune"
- Eddie Gómez – bass
- Warren Bernhardt – piano, clavinet
- Daniel Hankin – guitar
- Mike Mainieri – vibraphone
- Donald "Beautiful" MacDonald - drums

== Production notes ==
- Brooks Arthur – engineer
- David Krieger – art direction
- Neal Teeman – recording
