= Johnny Cash at Madison Square Garden =

Live album by Johnny Cash
- Released: August 27, 2002
- Recorded: December 5, 1969
- Venue: Madison Square Garden
- Genres: Country; rock and roll; gospel
- Length: 76:56
- Labels: Legacy Records; Columbia
- Producers: Bob Johnston (original); Al Quagleri (for release)

Johnny Cash chronology
20th Century Masters – The Millennium Collection: The Best of Johnny Cash (2002)	Johnny Cash at Madison Square Garden (2002)	American IV: The Man Comes Around (2002)

Professional ratings
Review scores
Source	Rating
AllMusic	4/5 stars
The Rolling Stone Album Guide	4/5 stars

Johnny Cash at Madison Square Garden is a 1969 recording of a Johnny Cash concert at Madison Square Garden. It was released in 2002.

== Track listing ==
1. "Big River" (J. Cash) – 2:21
2. "I Still Miss Someone" (Cash, Roy Cash Jr.) – 1:37
3. "Five Feet High and Rising" (Cash) – 2:52
4. "Pickin' Time" (Cash) – 2:36
5. "Remember the Alamo" (Jane Bowers) – 2:48
6. "Last Night I Had the Strangest Dream" (Ed McCurdy) – 3:04
7. "Wreck of the Old 97" (Arranged by Cash, Norman George Blake, Robert Johnson) – 2:14
8. "The Long Black Veil" (Danny Dill, Marijohn Wilkin) – 3:01
9. "The Wall" (Harlan Howard) – 1:09
10. "Send a Picture of Mother" (Cash) – 2:36
11. "Folsom Prison Blues" (Cash) – 3:35
12. "Blue Suede Shoes" (C. Perkins) – 3:13 (Carl Perkins)
13. "Flowers on the Wall" (L. DeWitt) – 2:32 (The Statler Brothers)
14. "Wildwood Flower" (A.P. Carter) – 3:45 (The Carter Family)
15. "Worried Man Blues" (A.P. Carter) – 1:40 (The Carter Family)
16. "A Boy Named Sue" (Shel Silverstein) – 4:25
17. "Cocaine Blues" (T.J. Arnall) – 1:57
18. "Jesus Was a Carpenter" (C. Wren) – 3:40
19. "The Ballad of Ira Hayes" (Pete LaFarge) – 3:11
20. "As Long as the Grass Shall Grow" (LaFarge) – 3:50
21. "Sing a Traveling Song" (K. Jones) – 3:30
22. "He Turned the Water into Wine" (Cash) – 3:16
23. "Were You There (When They Crucifed My Lord)" (Traditional, Arranged by Cash) – 4:16
24. "Daddy Sang Bass" (Carl Perkins) – 2:15
25. "Finale Medley" – 4:45:
  1. "Do What You Do, Do Well" (N. Miller) (Tommy Cash & Johnny Cash)
  2. "I Walk the Line" (Cash) (The Carter Family)
  3. "Ring of Fire" (Cash, M. Kilgore) (The Statler Brothers)
  4. "Folsom Prison Blues" (Cash) (Carl Perkins)
  5. "The Rebel – Johnny Yuma" (R. Markowitz, A. Fenady)
  6. "Folsom Prison Blues" (Cash)
26. "Suppertime" (I. F. Stanphill) – 2:55

== Personnel ==
- Johnny Cash - vocal, guitar

=== Carter Family ===
- Maybelle Carter - vocals, guitar
- Robbie Harden - vocals, guitar
- Anita Carter - vocals, guitar
- Helen Carter - vocals, guitar

=== The Statler Brothers ===
- Phil Balsley — vocals
- Lew DeWitt — vocals
- Don Reid — vocals
- Harold Reid — vocals

=== Backing Band ===
- Carl Perkins - electric guitar
- Marshall Grant - bass guitar
- W.S. Holland - drums
- Bob Wootton - electric guitar
- Tommy Cash - PA announcer, acoustic guitar, vocals

== Additional personnel ==
- Original Recording Produced by: Bob Johnston
- Produced for Release by: Al Quaglieri
- Mixed By: Thom Cadley at Sony Music Studios, New York
- Assistant Engineer: John Hill
- Edited and Mastered by: Darcy Proper at Sony Music Studios, New York
- Legacy A&R: Steve Berkowitz
- Project Designer: John Jackson
- A&R Coordination: Darren Salmieru
- Art Direction: Howard Frizson
- Design: Roxanne Slimark

== Charts ==
Album - Billboard (United States)

Chart (2002)	Peak position
US Billboard 200	196
US Top Country Albums (Billboard)	39
