= Sunday Morning Coming Down (album) =

Compilation album by Johnny Cash
- Released: 1972
- Recorded: 1972
- Genres: Country; rockabilly; gospel
- Length: 32:28

Johnny Cash chronology
Greatest Hits, Vol. 2 (1971)	Sunday Morning Coming Down (1972)	A Thing Called Love (1972)

Professional ratings
Review scores
Source	Rating
Allmusic	3/5 stars

Sunday Morning Coming Down is a Johnny Cash album, released in 1972. It is a compilation of previously released tracks. It consists of songs previously recorded on albums made from prison concerts or live albums and has songs such as "Folsom Prison Blues", "Orange Blossom Special", "Understand Your Man", and "Sunday Morning Coming Down".

The album was re-issued in 1999 without adding any new songs.

== Track listing ==
No.	Title	Writer(s)	Length
1.	"Folsom Prison Blues"	Johnny Cash	2:47
2.	"Orange Blossom Special"	Ervin Rouse	3:11
3.	"It Ain't Me Babe"	Bob Dylan	3:05
4.	"Big River"	Johnny Cash	2:23
5.	"I'm Gonna Try to Be That Way"	Johnny Cash	3:26
6.	"Green, Green Grass of Home"	Curly Putman	2:34
7.	"Understand Your Man"	Johnny Cash	2:47
8.	"If I Were a Carpenter"	Tim Hardin	3:03
9.	"Long Black Veil"	Danny Dill, Marijohn Wilkin	3:09
10.	"Don't Think Twice, It's All Right"	Bob Dylan	3:00
11.	"Sunday Morning Coming Down"	Kris Kristofferson	4:10

== Charts ==
Album – Billboard (United States)

Year	Chart	Position
1973	Country Albums	35
