= The World of Johnny Cash =

Compilation album by Johnny Cash
- Released: May 1970
- Recorded: August 13, 1958–August 14, 1962
- Genres: Country; blues; folk
- Length: 34:17
- Label: Columbia
- Producers: Don Law; Frank Jones

Johnny Cash chronology
Hello, I'm Johnny Cash (1970)	The World of Johnny Cash (1970)	The Johnny Cash Show (1970)

Professional ratings
Review scores
Source	Rating
Allmusic	4.5/5 stars

The World of Johnny Cash is a 1970 compilation album released by country singer Johnny Cash on Columbia Records. It contains some of Cash's minor hits, as well as several songs that were never released as singles. The album reached number 2 on the Country charts. It was certified Gold on 1/23/1971 by the R.I.A.A.

== Track listing ==
No.	Title	Writer(s)	Length
1.	"I Still Miss Someone"	Johnny Cash, Roy Cash	2:36
2.	"Pickin' Time"	Cash	2:36
3.	"My Shoes Keep Walking Back to You"	Bob Wills, Lee Ross	2:25
4.	"I Want to Go Home"	Cash	1:58
5.	"I Feel Better All Over"	Kenny Rogers, Leon Smith	2:05
6.	"I'm So Lonesome I Could Cry"	Hank Williams	2:40
7.	"Suppertime"	Ira P. Stanphill	2:51
8.	"In Them Old Cottonfields Back Home"	Lead Belly	2:32
9.	"Delia's Gone"	Karl Silbersdorf, Dick Toops	2:00
10.	"One More Ride"	Bob Nolan	2:02
11.	"Accidentally on Purpose"	George Jones, Darrell Edwards	1:55
12.	"In the Jailhouse Now"	Jimmie Rodgers	2:22
13.	"I Forgot More Than You'll Ever Know"	Cecil Null	2:23
14.	"Casey Jones"	T. Lawrence Seibert, Eddie Newton	1:34
15.	"Frankie's Man Johnny"	Cash	2:18
16.	"The Legend of John Henry's Hammer"	Johnny Cash, June Carter Cash	7:08
17.	"When Papa Played the Dobro"	Cash	2:54
18.	"Busted"	Harlan Howard	2:23
19.	"Sing It Pretty, Sue"	Cash	2:00
20.	"Waiting for a Train"	Rodgers	2:08

== Charts ==
Album – Billboard (United States)

Year	Chart	Position
1970	Country Albums	2
1970	Top LPs	54
