= Suite for Susan Moore and Damion: We Are One, One, All in One =

Studio album by Tim Hardin
- Released: March 1969
- Genre: Folk
- Length: 42.40
- Label: Columbia (CS 9787)
- Producer: Gary Klein

Tim Hardin chronology
The Best of Tim Hardin (1969)	Suite for Susan Moore and Damion: We Are One, One, All in One (1969)	Bird on a Wire (1971)

Suite for Susan Moore and Damion: We Are One, One, All in One is an album by folk artist Tim Hardin, released in 1969. It was Hardin's first release on his new label, Columbia Records. It peaked at No. 129 on the Billboard Pop Album charts.

== Background ==
Hardin had been sent to Nashville to record his debut album on his new label, Columbia. None of the material was deemed acceptable and remained unreleased until 1996 when they were included in the compilation Simple Songs of Freedom: The Tim Hardin Collection. He began another attempt and the result was few conventional songs, some impromptu blues jams interspersed with spoken-word selections. The resulting Suite for Susan Moore and Damion was Hardin's attempt to celebrate his life with his wife and son. The songs were recorded at Hardin's home in Woodstock, New York.

== Reception ==
Professional ratings
Review scores
Source	Rating
Allmusic	4/5 stars

In his review for Allmusic, music critic Bruce Eder wrote of the reissue that included Bird on a Wire: "There's a lot of pain in this disc, to be sure — it's hard to find a Hardin song that didn't have some — but also a level of lyrical and musical excellence that one should feel privileged to partake of."

== Track listing ==
All songs by Tim Hardin.

=== Side one ===
- Implication I
1. "First Love Song" – 4:26
2. "Everything Good Became More True" – 3:51
- Implication II
1. "Question of Birth" – 3:34
2. "Once Touched by Flame" – 2:54
3. "Last Sweet Moments" – 6:12

=== Side two ===
- Implication III
1. "Magician" – 3:40
2. "Loneliness She Knows" – 3:15
- End of Implication
1. "The Country I'm Living In" – 4:12
2. "One, One, the Perfect Sum" – 9:55
3. "Susan" – 0:41

== Personnel ==
- Tim Hardin – vocals, guitar, keyboards, arrangements
- Warren Bernhardt – keyboards, arrangements
- Buzz – keyboards
- David – saxophone
- Monte Dunn – guitar
- Keith – trumpet
- Gary Klein – keyboards
- Donald McDonald – drums

Technical

- Lou Jannone – engineer
- Don Puluse – "minister" of engineering
