= Simple Songs of Freedom: The Tim Hardin Collection =

Compilation album by Tim Hardin
- Released: September 3, 1996
- Recorded: 1968–1972
- Genre: Folk
- Length: 66:17
- Label: Columbia/Legacy

Tim Hardin chronology
Hang on to a Dream: The Verve Recordings (1994)	Simple Songs of Freedom: The Tim Hardin Collection (1996)

Simple Songs of Freedom: The Tim Hardin Collection is a compilation album by folk artist Tim Hardin, released in 1996. It includes selections from his three Columbia albums and five previously unreleased tracks.

== Reception ==
Professional ratings
Review scores
Source	Rating
Allmusic	2.5/5 stars

In his review for Allmusic, music critic Richie Unterberger wrote "Although his best work was behind him, he was still capable of recording good material... Simple Songs is the one album of post-Verve Hardin music to own."

== Track listing ==
All songs by Tim Hardin unless otherwise noted.

1. "Simple Song of Freedom" (Bobby Darin) (3:51)
2. "Shiloh Town" (3:09) *
3. "Turn the Page" (2:57) *
4. "Playing Cards/The Magician" (2:42) *
5. "First Love Song" (4:23) * *
6. "Last Sweet Moments" (6:07) * *
7. "If I Knew" (3:51)
8. "Hoboin'" (John Lee Hooker, Joe Josea) (3:25)
9. "André Johray" (2:48)
10. "Southern Butterfly" (2:49)
11. "Bird on a Wire" (Leonard Cohen) (5:26)
12. "Midnight Caller" (Pete Ham) (3:06)
13. "Yankee Lady" (Jesse Winchester) (4:24)
14. "Till We Meet Again" (Neil Sheppard) (3:10)
15. "I'll Be Home" (Randy Newman) (5:39)
16. "If I Knew" (4:37) * *
17. "Thanks to Gideon" (3:53)

* Previously unreleased tracks

* * Live tracks

== Personnel ==
- Tim Hardin – vocals, guitar
- Don Brooks - harmonica
