= Mansion over the Hilltop =

Song by Elvis Presley
- Songwriter: Ira Stanphill

"Mansion over the Hilltop" is a Southern Gospel song written by Ira Stanphill, written in 1949. It was most notably performed by Elvis Presley on the album His Hand in Mine.
