= Nine (Tim Hardin album) =

Studio album by Tim Hardin
- Released: 1973
- Recorded: 1973
- Studio: IBC Studios, London
- Genre: Folk
- Length: 42:03 (re-issue)
- Label: Antilles (AN-7023)
- Producer: Jimmy Horowitz

Tim Hardin chronology
Painted Head (1972)	Nine (1973)	Unforgiven (1981)

Nine is an album by folk artist Tim Hardin, recorded in England and released in 1973. It was Hardin's final finished studio album.

== Background ==
After the termination of his contract with Columbia, Hardin signed with GM Records. He had attempted to record "Shiloh Town" during the aborted Nashville sessions in 1968. The song was based on a traditional song, recorded previously by Richie Havens. The track "Blues on My Ceiling" was erroneously credited to Hardin and "While You're on Your Way" and "Never Too Far" were re-workings of his songs from his first album. The album was his last complete studio recording and was not released in the US until 1976.

Nine was re-issued on CD on the See For Miles label in 1994 with extensive liner notes and the single "Judge and Jury".

== Reception ==
Professional ratings
Review scores
Source	Rating
Allmusic	3/5 stars

In his review for Allmusic, music critic Bruce Eder wrote "This proved to be Hardin's final finished studio album, and there is a real sense — for all of the thick electric band sounds all over this record — of someone singing his insides out. Some of what's here is a shadow of the kind of writing that he did a decade earlier, although none of it is dull or predictable... It's all surprisingly good listening, and that goes double for fans of Hardin, though they may also be disturbed by some of what they hear and read."

NME said the album was "a classic of the comfy and contemplative soul genre. Hardin's voice invites you to luxuriate in the caressing melodies.

== Track listing ==
All tracks composed by Tim Hardin; except where indicated

=== Side one ===
1. "Shiloh Town" – 3:00
2. "Never Too Far" – 3:05
3. "Rags and Old Iron" (Oscar Brown, Norman Curtis) – 4:53
4. "Look Our Love Over" – 5:01
5. "Person to Person" (Andy Bown, Tim Hardin) – 3:48

=== Side two ===
1. "Darling Girl" (Michael d'Albuquerque) – 4:25
2. "Blues on My Ceiling" (Fred Neil) – 3:05
3. "Is There No Rest for the Weary" (Domenic Troiano) – 3:18
4. "Fire and Rain" (James Taylor) – 4:37
5. "While You're on Your Way" – 3:39
  1994 re-issue bonus track:
6. "Judge and Jury" – 3:22

== Personnel ==
- Tim Hardin – vocals, guitar, keyboards
- Peter Frampton – guitar on "Never Too Far" and "Rags and Old Iron"
- Andy Bown – bass
- Bob Cohen – guitar
- Mike Driscoll – drums
- Jimmy Horowitz – organ, arrangements, conductor; piano on "Person to Person"
- David Katz – violin, strings
- John Mealing – piano, electric piano
- Liza Strike – background vocals
- Sue Glover – background vocals
- Madeline Bell – background vocals

== Production notes ==
- Produced by Jimmy Horowitz
- Engineered by Andy Knight and Hugh Jones
- Mike Gill - art direction
- Dave Field - sleeve design
- Steve Campbell - photography
