= The Johnny Cash Show =

American music variety show (1969–1971)

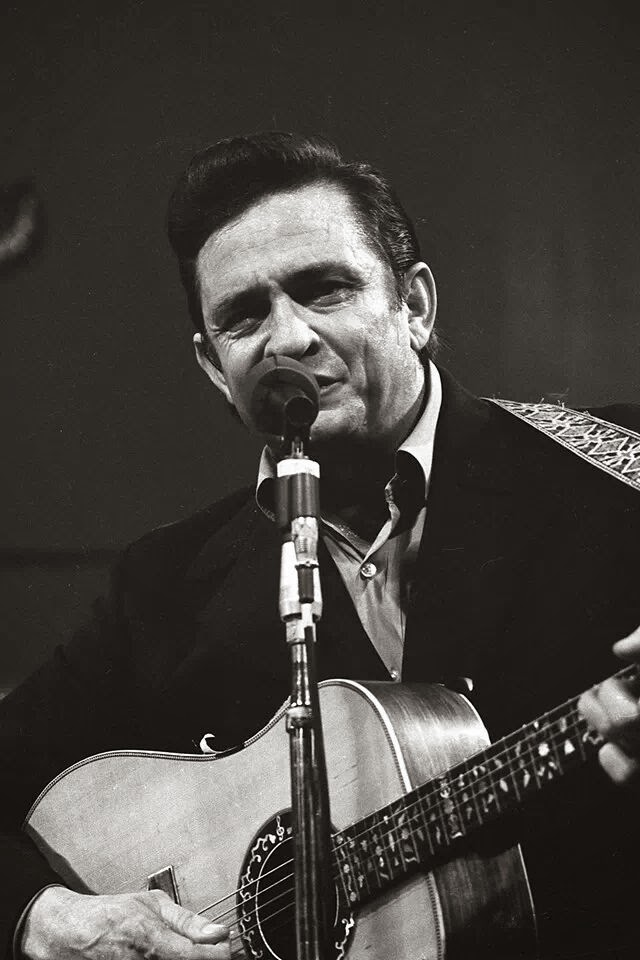
- Cash in 1969
- Genre: Music; Variety
- Starring: Johnny Cash; June Carter Cash; The Carter Family; Carl Perkins; The Statler Brothers; The Tennessee Three
- No. of seasons: 2
- No. of episodes: 58

Production
- Production company: Screen Gems

Original release
- Network: ABC
- Release: June 7, 1969 – March 31, 1971

The Johnny Cash Show is an American television music variety show that was hosted by Johnny Cash. The Screen Gems 58-episode series ran from June 7, 1969, to March 31, 1971, on ABC; it was taped at the Ryman Auditorium in Nashville, Tennessee. The show reached No. 17 in the Nielsen ratings in 1970.

Cash opened each show, invariably preceding the first number with his customary "Hello, I'm Johnny Cash" greeting, and its regulars included members of his touring troupe, June Carter Cash (his wife) and the Carter Family, The Statler Brothers, Carl Perkins, and The Tennessee Three, with Australian-born musical director-arranger-conductor Bill Walker. The Statler Brothers performed brief comic interludes. An instrumental version of "Folsom Prison Blues" was used for the opening credits.

It featured many folk, singer-songwriter and country musicians, such as Joni Mitchell, Bob Dylan, Waylon Jennings, Linda Ronstadt, Kris Kristofferson, Mickey Newbury, George Jones, Neil Young, Gordon Lightfoot, Merle Haggard, James Taylor, Tammy Wynette and Roy Orbison. It also featured other musicians such as jazz great Louis Armstrong, who died eight months after appearing on the show.

== Background ==
Cash had been approached by ABC to host a television show after the major success of his two live prison albums, At Folsom Prison and At San Quentin. The show started with an hour-long tryout offered by ABC as "a summer replacement for its Saturday night variety extravaganza The Hollywood Palace." While Cash had a large degree of freedom, he "had to accept some compromises by hosting showbiz royalty like Bob Hope, George Gobel, Kirk Douglas, Burl Ives, Peggy Lee and Lorne Greene. They gave the show gravitas that satisfied both advertisers and the network".

== Format ==
The show was recorded at Nashville's Ryman Auditorium, then home of the Grand Ole Opry. The show was conceived by Bill Carruthers, who also served as executive producer and director for the first season. Stan Jacobson was also a producer on the show. Myles Harmon was the program executive for ABC Television. The first show featured Joni Mitchell, Cajun fiddler Doug Kershaw, Fannie Flagg as a comic, and Bob Dylan.

The show included a "Country Gold" segment which featured legends rarely or never seen on network TV such as Bill Monroe and his Blue Grass Boys. Author Rich Kienzle suggests that as well as providing entertainment, the show operated as a "Country Music 101".

Cash persisted in the face of ABC "network anxieties" on several occasions. He refused to cut the word "stoned" from Kris Kristofferson's "Sunday Morning Coming Down", he stood by his Christian faith "despite network anxieties", and persisted in bringing on Pete Seeger whose anti-Vietnam War song on another network had "caused a firestorm". He premiered his "Man in Black" song on an episode taped at Nashville's Vanderbilt University campus.

In 1970, Columbia Records released The Johnny Cash Show, a live album, as a tie-in with the TV series, though the record is not considered a soundtrack. The release is unusual as Columbia was affiliated with competing network CBS. Cash's version of Kris Kristofferson's "Sunday Morning Coming Down", included on the series, is included on the album and was released as a single, which was a major hit for Cash.

One unusual taping occurred in 1971. Cash began the program assuming it was a regular episode. Moments after Cash greeted the audience, June Carter Cash came on stage and said she had a special guest. Ralph Edwards then joined the two on stage; as the audience erupted in a standing ovation, Cash realized that it was actually a taping for an installment of This Is Your Life honoring him.

== Series overview ==
Season	Episodes	Originally released		
Season	Episodes	First released	Last released	Network
1	32	June 7, 1969	May 13, 1970	ABC
2	26	September 23, 1970	March 31, 1971	ABC

== List of episodes ==
=== Season 1 (1969–1970) ===
32 episodes

#	Airdate	Guests
1.1	June 7, 1969	Bob Dylan; Joni Mitchell; Doug Kershaw
1.2	June 14, 1969	Gordon Lightfoot; Dan Blocker; Joey Scarbury; Evie Sands; The Carter Family; The Statler Brothers
1.3	June 21, 1969	Eddie Albert; Jerry Reed; Linda Ronstadt
1.4	July 5, 1969	Buffy Sainte-Marie; Doug McClure; The Cowsills
1.5	July 12, 1969	Jeannie C. Riley; Glen Campbell; Joe Tex
1.6	July 19, 1969	Ed Ames; Joni Mitchell; The Monkees; Roy Clark
1.7	July 26, 1969	Dale Robertson; Marty Robbins; Lynn Kellogg
1.8	August 2, 1969	O.C. Smith; Merle Haggard; Merrilee Rush; Carl Perkins
1.9	August 9, 1969	Diana Trask; Pat Boone; Tom T. Hall
1.10	August 16, 1969	O.C. Smith; Kenny Rogers and The First Edition; Melanie; Grandpa Jones
1.11	August 23, 1969	Chet Atkins; Lulu
1.12	August 30, 1969	Roger Miller; Odetta; Carl Perkins
1.13	September 6, 1969	Charley Pride; Ian & Sylvia
1.14	September 20, 1969	Cass Elliot; Ramblin' Jack Elliot; The Staple Singers; Tommy Cash
1.15	September 27, 1969	Roy Orbison; Creedence Clearwater Revival; Phil Harris; Bobbi Martin
1.16	January 21, 1970	Arlo Guthrie; Jose Feliciano; Bobbie Gentry
1.17	January 28, 1970	Glen Campbell; Marty Robbins; Nancy Ames
1.18	February 4, 1970	Dusty Springfield; Rod McKuen; Kirk Douglas
1.19	February 11, 1970	Ray Charles; Neil Diamond; Tammy Wynette
1.20	February 18, 1970	Vikki Carr; Pete Seeger
1.21	February 25, 1970	Cass Elliot; Kenny Rogers and The First Edition
1.22	March 4, 1970	Brenda Lee; Roger Miller; Carl Perkins; Pete Seeger
1.23	March 11, 1970	O.C. Smith; Hank Williams Jr.; Linda Ronstadt
1.24	March 18, 1970	George Gobel; Merle Haggard; Jeannie C. Riley
1.25	March 25, 1970	Waylon Jennings; Jackie DeShannon; Michael Parks; Statler Brothers; Carl Perkins
1.26	April 1, 1970	Kenny Rogers and The First Edition; Roy Orbison; Shel Silverstein
1.27	April 8, 1970	Patti Page; Tony White
1.28	April 15, 1970	George Jones; Bobby Goldsboro; Judy Collins
1.29	April 22, 1970	Lynn Anderson; Burl Ives
1.30	April 29, 1970	Chet Atkins; Kris Kristofferson; Ricky Nelson; Loretta Lynn; Doug Kershaw
1.31	May 6, 1970	Merle Haggard; Brenda Lee; Charley Pride
1.32	May 13, 1970	Tex Ritter; Roy Acuff; Marty Robbins; Danny Davis & the Nashville Brass

=== Season 2 (1970–1971) ===
26 episodes

#	Airdate	Guests
2.1	September 30, 1970	Ray Charles; Liza Minnelli; Arlo Guthrie
2.2	September 23, 1970	Jackie DeShannon; Dennis Hopper; Statler Brothers
2.3	October 7, 1970	Joni Mitchell; Joe South; George Lindsey
2.4	October 14, 1970	José Feliciano; Bobby Bare; Linda Ronstadt; Mac Davis
2.5	October 21, 1970	Peggy Lee; The Guess Who; Marty Robbins; Tommy Cash
2.6	October 28, 1970	Louis Armstrong; Tennessee Ernie Ford; Kenny Rogers and The First Edition
2.7	November 4, 1970	Burl Ives; Statler Brothers
2.8	November 11, 1970	George Gobel; Stevie Wonder; Ian & Sylvia; Bill Monroe
2.9	November 18, 1970	Kris Kristofferson; Cass Elliot; Statler Brothers; Lorne Greene
2.10	November 25, 1970	Glen Campbell; Stoneman Family; Tony Joe White
2.11	December 2, 1970	Homer & Jethro; Statler Brothers; Merle Haggard; Bonnie Owens; Anne Murray
2.12	December 16, 1970	Jackie DeShannon; Hank Snow; Carl Perkins; Al Hirt
2.13	December 25, 1970	"The Johnny Cash Christmas Show": Statler Brothers; Everly Brothers; Roy Orbison
2.14	January 6, 1971	Derek and the Dominos; Eric Andersen
2.15	January 13, 1971	Gordon Lightfoot; Bill Anderson; Statler Brothers; Homer & Jethro
2.16	January 21, 1971	"The History of Country Music: Part 1": Roy Acuff; Eddy Arnold; Carl Perkins; Marty Robbins; Buck Owens; Merle Haggard
2.17	January 28, 1971	"The History of Country Music: Part 2": Chet Atkins; Merle Haggard; Sonny James; Gordon Lightfoot; Webb Pierce; Takahiro Saito; B.J. Thomas; Kitty Wells; Tammy Wynette; Minnie Pearl; Faron Young; Carl Perkins
2.18	February 3, 1971	Ballads Of The True West
2.19	February 10, 1971	Comedy, Country Style
2.20	February 17, 1971	James Taylor; Linda Ronstadt; Neil Young; The Dillards; Tony Joe White
2.21	February 24, 1971	Make A Joyful Noise: Mahalia Jackson; Edwin Hawkins; Staple Singers; Blackwood Brothers; The Oak Ridge Boys; Stuart Hamblen; Billy Graham
2.22	March 3, 1971	"Circus for Children Of All Ages"
2.23	March 10, 1971	Conway Twitty; Statler Brothers
2.24	March 17, 1971	Statler Brothers
2.25	March 24, 1971	The Carpenters; Red Lane; Charley Pride; Bob Luman; Tommy Cash
2.26	March 31, 1971	Merle Travis

== Cancellation ==
The show was canceled in 1971 in response to the Prime Time Access Rule, which eliminated a half-hour of network prime time programming from all of the major networks' nightly schedules. Cash's show was one of many that had strong rural followings that were canceled across the networks in what came to be known as the "rural purge."

== Revival ==
In 1976, CBS ran a revival of the show, Johnny Cash and Friends, as a replacement series for four weeks from August 29 to September 20, 1976. The new show was taped at the newly constructed Grand Ole Opry House in Nashville. Aside from musical performances, this series also featured a greater emphasis on comedy, with Steve Martin and Jim Varney appearing as regulars, and with June Carter Cash performing several comedy routines as "Aunt Polly" (reviving a character she had performed early in her career).

Following Johnny Cash and Friends, an annual Johnny Cash Christmas Special series was launched, starting in 1976, with specials airing almost every year until 1985.

== The Best of The Johnny Cash TV Show ==
A DVD set featuring 66 live performances from the show, called The Best of The Johnny Cash TV Show, was released in Region 1 on September 18, 2007. The DVD set was hosted by Kris Kristofferson and directed by Michael B. Borofsky, and was produced by Reverse Angle Productions for Sony Pictures Entertainment and Legacy Recordings, Sony Music Entertainment's catalog division. An accompanying CD, featuring selected numbers from the show (some of them not on the DVD set), was also released.

=== DVD track list ===
==== DVD 1 ====
1. Johnny Cash – "Ring Of Fire"
2. Bob Dylan – "I Threw It All Away
  - From Season 1, Episode 1, originally aired June 7, 1969.
3. Bob Dylan and Johnny Cash – "Girl From The North Country
  - From Season 1, Episode 1, originally aired June 7, 1969.
4. Kris Kristofferson – "Loving Her Was Easier (Than Anything I'll Ever Do Again)
5. Louis Armstrong and Johnny Cash – "Blue Yodel No. 9
  - From Season 2, Episode 6, originally aired October 28, 1970.
6. Stevie Wonder – "Heaven Help Us All
  - From Season 2, Episode 8, originally aired November 11, 1970.
7. Creedence Clearwater Revival – "Bad Moon Rising
  - From Season 1, Episode 15, originally aired September 27, 1969.
8. Linda Ronstadt and Johnny Cash – "I Never Will Marry
9. George Jones – Medley ("White Lightning" with Johnny Cash, "She Thinks I Still Care", "Love Bug", "The Race Is On")
10. Johnny Cash – "Hey Porter"
11. Waylon Jennings – Medley ("Only Daddy That'll Walk The Line", "The Singing Star's Queen", "Brown Eyed Handsome Man")
12. Tammy Wynette – "Stand By Your Man"
  - From Season 2, Episode 17, originally aired January 28, 1971.
13. Marty Robbins – Medley ("Big Iron", "Running Gun", "El Paso")
  - From Season 1, Episode 17, originally aired January 28, 1970.
14. Johnny Cash – "Come Along And Ride This Train"
15. Johnny Cash – "As Long As The Grass Shall Grow"
16. Johnny Cash – "Man in Black"
17. James Taylor – "Sweet Baby James"
  - From Season 2, Episode 20, originally aired February 17, 1971.
18. Pete Seeger and Johnny Cash – "Cripple Creek"
19. Pete Seeger and Johnny Cash – "Worried Man Blues"
20. Johnny Cash – "Sunday Morning Coming Down"
21. Johnny Cash – "Old Time Religion"
22. Johnny Cash, The Carter Family, The Statler Brothers, Carl Perkins and The Tennessee Three – "Daddy Sang Bass"
23. Mother Maybelle and The Carter Sisters – "Wildwood Flower"
24. Neil Young – "The Needle and the Damage Done"
  - From Season 2, Episode 20, originally aired February 17, 1971.
25. Johnny Cash and The Tennessee Three – "Tennessee Flat Top Box"
26. Joni Mitchell and Johnny Cash – "The Long Black Veil"
  - From Season 1, Episode 6, originally aired July 19, 1969.
27. Johnny Cash and The Tennessee Three with Carl Perkins – "Big River"

==== DVD 2 ====
1. Johnny Cash – "I Walk The Line"
2. June Carter Cash – "A Good Man"
3. Derek and the Dominos – "It's Too Late"
  - From Season 2, Episode 14, originally aired January 6, 1971.
4. Derek and the Dominos with Johnny Cash and Carl Perkins – "Matchbox"
5. Charley Pride – "Able Bodied Man"
6. Chorus & Johnny Cash – "Country Gold Intro"
7. Bill Monroe And His Blue Grass Boys – "Blue Moon Of Kentucky"
  - From Season 2, Episode 8, originally aired November 11, 1970.
8. Loretta Lynn – "I Know How"
  - From Season 1, Episode 30, originally aired April 29, 1970.
9. Jerry Lee Lewis – "Whole Lotta Shakin' Goin' On"
10. Johnny Cash – "Ride This Train"
11. Johnny Cash – "America The Beautiful"
12. Johnny Cash – "This Land Is Your Land"
13. The Everly Brothers with Ike Everly and Johnny and Tommy Cash – "That Silver Haired Daddy Of Mine"
14. Ray Charles – "Ring Of Fire"
15. Johnny Cash – "A Boy Named Sue"
16. Conway Twitty – "Hello Darlin'"
17. Mother Maybelle Carter – "Black Mountain Rag"
18. Tony Joe White and Johnny Cash – "Polk Salad Annie"
19. Glen Campbell – "Wichita Lineman"
  - From Season 2, Episode 10, originally aired November 25, 1970.
20. Neil Diamond – "Cracklin' Rosie"
21. Ray Price – "For The Good Times"
22. Roy Orbison – "Cryin'"
  - From Season 1, Episode 15, originally aired September 27, 1969.
23. Roy Orbison and Johnny Cash – "Pretty Woman"
  - From Season 1, Episode 15, originally aired September 27, 1969.
24. Johnny Cash – "Wanted Man"
25. Chet Atkins and Johnny Cash – "Recuerdo De La Alhambra"
26. Chet Atkins – "Medley ("Back Home in Indiana", "Country Gentleman", "Mister Sandman", "Wildwood Flower", Freight Train)"
  - From Season 1, Episode 30, originally aired April 29, 1970.
27. June Carter Cash with Homer And Jethro – "Baby, It's Cold Outside"
28. Merle Haggard – "No Hard Times"
29. Merle Haggard and Johnny Cash – "Sing Me Back Home"
30. Carl Perkins – "Blue Suede Shoes"
  - From Season 2, Episode 16, originally aired January 21, 1971.
31. Johnny Cash, Carl Perkins, The Carter Family and The Statler Brothers – "The Old Account Was Settled Long Ago"
32. Roy Clark – "Medley ("In The Summertime", "12th Street Rag")
  - From Season 1, Episode 6, originally aired July 19, 1969.
33. The Statler Brothers – "Flowers on the Wall"
34. Johnny Cash – "Working Man Blues"
35. Johnny Cash and June Carter Cash – "Jackson"
36. Johnny Cash and June Carter Cash – "Turn Around"
37. Johnny Cash and June Carter Cash – "I Love You Because"
38. Hank Williams Jr. – Medley ("You Win Again", "Cold Cold Heart", "I Can't Help It If I'm Still in Love With You", "Half As Much")
39. Johnny Cash – "A Wonderful Time Up There"

=== CD track list ===
1. Johnny Cash – "I Walk the Line"
2. Johnny Cash – "Flesh and Blood"
3. Tammy Wynette – "Stand by Your Man"
4. George Jones – "She Thinks I Still Care", "Love Bug", "The Race Is On"
5. Johnny Cash – "I've Been Everywhere"
6. Bobby Bare – "Detroit City"
7. Ray Charles – "Ring of Fire"
8. Derek and the Dominoes – "It's Too Late"
9. Kris Kristofferson – "Loving Her Was Easier (Than Anything I'll Ever Do Again)"
10. Roy Orbison – "Only the Lonely", "Oh, Pretty Woman"
11. Johnny Cash with The Carter Family and The Statler Brothers – "Belshazzar"
12. Waylon Jennings – "Brown Eyed Handsome Man"
13. Johnny Cash and Joni Mitchell – "Girl From the North Country"
14. James Taylor – "Fire and Rain"
15. Johnny Cash, The Carter Family, The Statler Brothers, Carl Perkins and The Tennessee Three – "Daddy Sang Bass"
16. Johnny Cash – Closing Monologue – "I Walk the Line" (reprise)
