= Hello, I'm Johnny Cash =

Studio album by Johnny Cash
- Released: January 26, 1970
- Recorded: February 17 – September 10, 1969
- Genres: Country rock; talking blues
- Length: 37:10
- Label: Columbia
- Producer: Bob Johnston

Johnny Cash chronology
More of Old Golden Throat (1969)	Hello, I'm Johnny Cash (1970)	The World of Johnny Cash (1970)

Singles from Hello, I'm Johnny Cash
- 1. "Blistered / See Ruby Fall" Released: October 21, 1969; 2. "If I Were a Carpenter" Released: December 22, 1969

Professional ratings
Review scores
Source	Rating
AllMusic	link

Hello, I'm Johnny Cash is a 1970 album by American country singer Johnny Cash, released on Columbia Records. It includes a range of songs recorded from February to September the previous year, 1969, two of which had been successful as singles: "If I Were a Carpenter", a duet with Cash's wife, June Carter Cash, which gained the couple a Grammy Award for Best Country Performance by a Duo or Group with Vocal in 1971, and reached No. 2 on the Country charts; and "Blistered" with "See Ruby Fall" which charted as a double-A-side, reaching No. 4. On the Hot 100, "Blistered" reached No. 50, and "See Ruby Fall" No. 75. (according to some sources, both songs reached No. 50)..

This album includes "To Beat the Devil", the first Kris Kristofferson song covered by Cash. The album reached No. 1 on the country charts and No. 6 on the pop charts. It was certified Gold on January 29, 1970 by the RIAA. The album has been released on CD (Sony Music, Original Album Classics, along with The Johnny Cash Show and Man In Black) and it has been made available on official download sites. This album is not to be confused with a 1977 Columbia Special Products compilation LP (issued on CD in 1992) with the same name.

== Track listing ==
No.	Title	Writer(s)	Length
1.	"Southwind"	Johnny Cash	3:15
2.	"Devil to Pay"	Merle Travis, Leon Rusk	3:28
3.	"'Cause I Love You" (duet with June Carter Cash)	Johnny Cash	2:34
4.	"See Ruby Fall"	Johnny Cash, Roy Orbison	2:52
5.	"Route No. 1, Box 144"	Johnny Cash	2:28
6.	"Sing a Traveling Song"	Ken Jones	3:08
7.	"If I Were a Carpenter" (duet with June Carter Cash)	Tim Hardin	3:00
8.	"To Beat the Devil"	Kris Kristofferson	4:22
9.	"Blistered"	Billy Edd Wheeler	2:25
10.	"Wrinkled Crinkled Wadded Dollar Bill"	Vincent Matthews	2:32
11.	"I've Got a Thing About Trains"	Jack Clement	2:50
12.	"Jesus Was a Carpenter"	Chris Wren	3:57

== Personnel ==
- Johnny Cash - vocals, guitar
- Carl Perkins, Bob Wootton, Jerry Shook, Fred Carter, Jr. - guitar
- Norman Blake - dobro, guitar
- Marshall Grant - bass guitar
- W.S. Holland - drums
- Bill Pursell - piano on "See Ruby Fall" and "If I Were a Carpenter"
- George Tidwell, Bob Phillips, William Pippin - trumpet
- The Carter Family - backing vocals

Technical

- Charlie Bragg - engineer
- Joel Baldwin - cover photograph

== Charts ==
=== Weekly charts ===
Chart (1970)	Peak position
US Billboard 200	6
US Top Country Albums (Billboard)	1

=== Year-end charts ===
Chart (1970)	Position
US Billboard 200	54
US Top Country Albums (Billboard)	5

=== Singles ===
Year	Single	Chart	Position
1969	"Blistered"	Country Singles	4
1969	"Blistered"	Pop Singles	50
1969	"See Ruby Fall"	Country Singles	4
1969	"See Ruby Fall"	Pop Singles	75
1969	"If I Were a Carpenter"	Country Singles	2
1969	"If I Were a Carpenter"	Pop Singles	36

== Certifications ==
Region	Certification	Certified units/sales
United States (RIAA)	Gold	500,000^{^}
^{^} Shipments figures based on certification alone.
