= Unforgiven (Tim Hardin album) =

Studio album by Tim Hardin
- Released: 1981
- Recorded: Shangri La Studios, Brydclyffe, Tim Hardin's Home, Phantom Studios
- Genre: Folk
- Label: San Francisco Sound (SFS 10810)
- Producer: Don Rubin, Caroline Rubin

Tim Hardin chronology
Nine (1973)	Unforgiven (1981)	The Tim Hardin Memorial Album (1981)

Unforgiven is the album folk artist Tim Hardin was recording in 1980 but failed to complete due to his death from a drug overdose.

Portions of the album are incomplete studio tracks with vocals. Other songs are from home cassette demos recorded by Hardin prior to his death.

The original version of "Judge and Jury" was his last single, released in 1973 in the UK only.

== Track listing ==
=== Side one ===
1. "Unforgiven"
2. "Luna Cariba"
3. "Mercy Wind"
4. "If I Were Still With You"

=== Side two ===
1. "Judge and Jury"
2. "Partly Yours"
3. "Sweet Feeling"
4. "Secret"

== Personnel ==
- Tim Hardin – vocals, guitar, keyboards
- Nicky Hopkins – piano
- Jim Cuomo – piano, dombra
- Ken Lauber – piano
- Johnny Lee – guitar
- Pete Grant – pedal steel guitar
- Reginald Butler – bass
- Ricky Fataar – drums
- Denny Seiwell – drums
- Lisa Bialac – background vocals

== Production notes ==
- Produced by Rob Fraboni
- Executive Producers: Don Rubin, Caroline Rubin
- Tim Kramer – engineer
- Matthew Katz – cover concept
- Pompa – cover art
