= Tim Hardin 4 =

Studio album by Tim Hardin
- Released: February 1969
- Recorded: May 1964
- Genre: Folk
- Length: 35:21
- Label: Verve (FTS 3064)
- Producer: Erik Jacobsen

Tim Hardin chronology
Tim Hardin 3 Live in Concert (1968)	Tim Hardin 4 (1969)	The Best of Tim Hardin (1969)

Tim Hardin 4 is an album by folk and blues artist Tim Hardin, released in 1969.

Producer Erik Jacobsen recorded these blues songs as an audition demo with Tim, John Sebastian, Sticks Evans, and Bob Bushnell for Columbia Records in 1964. They were not issued until 1969 when Verve Forecast released them as if they were newly recorded. The songs are in a straightahead blues style. Hardin recorded a similar set of much better songs about the same time which Atco released as This is Tim Hardin.

== Reception ==
Professional ratings
Review scores
Source	Rating
Allmusic	2/5 stars

In his review for Allmusic, music critic Jim Newsom wrote "... the album holds some interest as a historical document... This is not essential listening by any means, but it's pleasant enough to hear on a lazy, cloud-covered afternoon."

== Track listing ==
All songs by Tim Hardin unless otherwise noted.

1. "Airmobile" – 2:19
2. "Whiskey, Whiskey" – 5:39
3. "Seventh Son" (Willie Dixon) – 2:05
4. "How Long" – 4:30
5. "Danville Dame" – 2:45
6. "Ain't Gonna Do Without" (Part I) – 2:08
7. "Ain't Gonna Do Without" (Part II) – 1:30
8. "House of the Rising Sun" (author unknown) – 3:35
9. "Bo Diddley" (Bo Diddley) – 2:45
10. "I Can't Slow Down" – 2:27
11. "Hello Baby" – 5:23

== Personnel ==
- Tim Hardin – vocals, guitar
- John Sebastian – harmonica
- Bob Bushnell – bass
- Sticks Evans – drums
