= 20th Century Masters – The Millennium Collection: The Best of Johnny Cash =

Compilation album by Johnny Cash
- Released: May 21, 2002
- Genre: Country
- Length: 34:42
- Label: Mercury

Johnny Cash chronology
The Essential Johnny Cash (2002)	20th Century Masters – The Millennium Collection: The Best of Johnny Cash (2002)	At Madison Square Garden (2002)

20th Century Masters – The Millennium Collection: The Best of Johnny Cash is a compilation album by the American country singer Johnny Cash. It mostly contains re-recordings of Cash's music from his 1988 album Classic Cash: Hall of Fame Series.

== Reception ==
Professional ratings
Review scores
Source	Rating
AllMusic	2/5 stars
The Rolling Stone Album Guide	3/5 stars
Tom Hull	B+

In a review of the album for AllMusic, William Ruhlmann stated that "there is a reasonable compilation to be constructed from this material, a collection that, for example, might include Cash's version of Elvis Costello's "The Big Light" (from 1987's Is Coming to Town) and the Paul McCartney collaboration "New Moon Over Jamaica" (from 1988's Water From the Wells of Home), but this isn't it," and that "the compilers of this discount-priced compilation have pulled nine of 12 tracks from that album. So, instead of being a collection that would accurately represent Cash's stint at Mercury, this is just an attempt to fool consumers into buying a bunch of re-recordings."

PopMatters critic Andrew Gilstrap states that "Sure, 20th Century Masters has “I Walk the Line”, “Folsom Prison Blues”, and a handful of other familiar Cash tunes, but they come from a 1987 CD called Classic Cash: Hall of Fame Series, which found Cash re-recording some of his classic songs." and that it "isn’t a proper document of those Mercury years, though. It’s reliance on reworked versions of songs Cash originally performed for other labels falsely implies that he really didn't do anything interesting for Mercury. It’s true that Cash’s Mercury years will never stand up to his years at Sun or Sony, but they weren’t a complete washout. In that sense, 20th Century Masters does a disservice not only to Cash, but to fans who might unwittingly pick up this flawed collection."

== Track listing ==
1. The Night Hank Williams Came to Town (featuring Waylon Jennings) – 3:25
2. Cry! Cry! Cry! – 2:27
3. Long Black Veil – 3:16
4. I Walk the Line – 2:35
5. Tennessee Flat Top Box – 3:08
6. Get Rhythm – 2:32
7. I Still Miss Someone – 03:00
8. Blue Train – 2:06
9. Folsom Prison Blues – 2:47
10. Home of the Blues – 3:16
11. Cat's in the Cradle – 3:18
12. Wanted Man – 2:52

== Charts ==
Chart performance for 20th Century Masters – The Millennium Collection: The Best of Johnny Cash
Chart (2003)	Peak position
US Top Country Albums (Billboard)	47
