= Blistered =

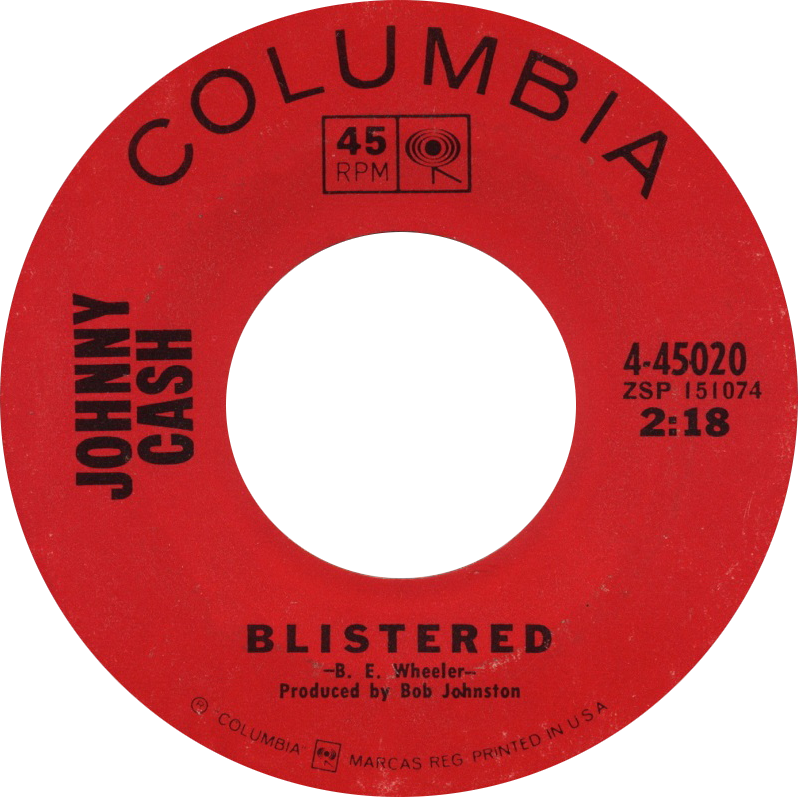
- Side A of US vinyl single

Single by Johnny Cash

from the album Hello, I'm Johnny Cash
- B-side: "See Ruby Fall"
- Released: October 1969
- Recorded: 1969
- Genre: Country, rock and roll
- Length: 2:25
- Label: Columbia
- Songwriter: Billy Ed Wheeler
- Producer: Bob Johnston

Johnny Cash singles chronology
"Get Rhythm" (1969)	"Blistered" (1969)	"If I Were a Carpenter" (1969)

"Blistered" is a song recorded by American country music artist Johnny Cash. It was released in October 1969, and would later be included on his album Hello, I'm Johnny Cash, released in January the following year. The song peaked at #4 on the Billboard Hot Country Singles chart. It also reached #1 on the RPM Country Tracks chart in Canada. The song was written by Billy Ed Wheeler.

"Blistered" was also featured as an album track on "And Then Along Comes...The Association" (Valiant Records, June, 1966). This version featured Russ Giguere on vocals and had a quick-tempo rock and roll sound.

== Chart performance ==
Chart (1969–1970)	Peak position
US Hot Country Songs (Billboard)	4
US Billboard Hot 100	50
Canadian RPM Country Tracks	1
