= Kenneth Jones (songwriter) =

American song writer

- Born: Kenneth Burton Jones; 1952
- Died: 1969 (aged 16–17)
- Occupation: Songwriter
- Known for: Member of the Carter Family
- Parents: Glenn Jones (father); Helen Carter (mother)

Kenneth Burton Jones (1952–1969), was the second son of Helen Myrl Carter (of country music's Carter Family) and of Glenn Jones. He is best remembered for a song he wrote called "Sing a Traveling Song" which appeared on Johnny Cash's albums Hello, I'm Johnny Cash (1970) and Johnny Cash at Madison Square Garden (1969). Kenneth was Cash's nephew-in-law. Cash's second wife, June Carter Cash, was Helen's sister. Kenneth, or Kenny as he was also known, wrote many songs and was a talented musician. At the time of his death, he was under contract with Monument Records and appeared destined for a highly successful career. Following his death the Carter Family recorded one of his songs, 2001 Ballad to the Future. A few have noted the lyrics as being eerily prophetic of the September 11 attacks on the United States which took place more than thirty years after the song was written.

During the introduction to "Sing A Traveling Song" on the Johnny Cash at Madison Square Garden album, Cash says, "One of the songs in the new album Hello, I'm Johnny Cash was written by a young man, 15 years old [sic], Kenny Jones, who was the son of Helen Carter. We do this song tonight as a tribute to Kenny Jones who was killed in an automobile accident at the age of 16. And to give you an idea of the talents of this young man while he was with us, here was a song that he wrote when he was 14."
