= Two Tickets and a Candy Heart =

- US 7-inch single

Single by Johnny Mathis
- B-side: "Saturday Sunshine"
- Released: 1967
- Recorded: August 31, 1964
- Genre: Pop
- Length: 2:12
- Label: Mercury
- Songwriters: Leon Carr; Paul Vance

Johnny Mathis singles chronology
"So Nice (Samba de Verão)" (1966)	"Two Tickets and a Candy Heart" (1967)	"Don't Talk to Me" / "Misty Roses" (1967)

Music video
- "Two Tickets and a Candy Heart" on YouTube

"Two Tickets and a Candy Heart" is a popular song written by Paul Vance and Leon Carr that was recorded by Johnny Mathis in 1964. It charted in 1967.

== Recording ==
Johnny Mathis recorded "Two Tickets and a Candy Heart" on August 31, 1964, with an orchestra conducted by Quincy Jones. The music was arranged by Torrie Zito. The only production credit provided on the original 7-inch single reads, "A Global Records, Inc. Production". When Mathis signed with Mercury Records in 1963, Global Records was the imprint created for him to record under. The song that became the B-side, "Saturday Sunshine", was written by Burt Bacharach and Hal David and recorded for the Johnny Mathis Sings album on October 28, 1966.

== Chart performance ==
"Two Tickets and a Candy Heart" debuted on Billboard magazine's Easy Listening chart in the issue dated March 4, 1967, and got as high as number 38 during its two weeks there.

== Critical reception ==
In their review column, the editors of Cash Box magazine featured the single as one of their Best Bets, which was their equivalent to a letter grade of A for "Saturday Sunshine". "Two Tickets and a Candy Heart" received a B+ and was described as a "[f]lowing, lyrical love ode". The editors of Billboard only predicted that "Saturday Sunshine" would reach the magazine's Hot 100 pop chart.

== Charts ==
Weekly chart performance for "Two Tickets and a Candy Heart"
Chart (1967)	Peak position
US Billboard Easy Listening	38
