= Return to the Promised Land =

Soundtrack album by Johnny Cash and June Carter Cash
- Released: November 21, 2000
- Recorded: March 14, 1991–August 1992
- Studios: LST Recording Studio (Nashville); Music Mill Studio (Nashville); Bob Cummings Productions (Nashville); LSI Recording Studio (Nashville)
- Genre: Gospel
- Length: 60:39
- Label: Renaissance
- Producer: Hugh Waddell

Johnny Cash chronology
American III: Solitary Man (2000)	Return to the Promised Land (2000)	The Essential Johnny Cash (2002)

Return to the Promised Land is a gospel music soundtrack and 80th overall album by American country singer Johnny Cash and his wife, June Carter Cash. The album was released in 2000 as the soundtrack to the 45-minute VHS video of the same title released in 1992 by Rev. Billy Graham's World Wide Pictures.

== Track listing ==
All tracks by Johnny Cash except as noted.

No.	Title	Writer(s)	Length
1.	"News Conference"		0:51
2.	"Return to the Promised Land"		3:01
3.	"Opening Dialogue"		0:14
4.	"When I Look"		2:57
5.	"Dialogue"		0:55
6.	"Over the Next Hill We'll Be Home"		2:09
7.	"Dialogue" (Tour Guides)		1:18
8.	"The Old Rugged Cross"	George Bennard	0:57
9.	"Interlude and Monologue"		0:34
10.	"I Won't Have to Cross Jordan Alone"	Charles E. Durham, Tom Ramsey	0:47
11.	"Dialogue"		0:54
12.	"Far Side Banks of Jordan"	Terry Smith	2:10
13.	"Monologue"		1:04
14.	"Let Me Help You Carry This Weight"	Johnny Cash, June Carter Cash	2:24
15.	"Dialogue"		1:31
16.	"Lord Take These Hands"		3:43
17.	"Monologue"		1:43
18.	"Fishers of Men"		0:47
19.	"Dialogue"		1:48
20.	"The Old Gospel Ship"		2:25
21.	"What on Earth Will You Do (For Heaven's Sake)"		2:03
22.	"Interlude"		1:10
23.	"God's Hands"		2:25
24.	"Return to the Promised Land" (instrumental)		1:50

Bonus tracks
No.	Title	Length
25.	"Hello Out There"	2:44
26.	"Like a Soldier Getting over the War"	2:48
27.	"Poor Valley Girl"	2:15
28.	"Soldier Boy"	2:53
29.	"Untitled interview with Carrie Cash" (Cash, Cash, John Carter Cash)	10:11
