= Misty Roses (song) =

1966 song by Tim Hardin

Song
- Released: 1966
- Genre: Easy listening
- Songwriter: Tim Hardin

"Misty Roses" is a popular song written by Tim Hardin that originally appeared on his debut album, Tim Hardin 1, in 1966. The song was a minor Easy Listening hit for Johnny Mathis in 1967 and was covered by several other artists.

== Tim Hardin version ==
"Misty Roses" and another song from Tim Hardin 1, "Don't Make Promises", were produced by Erik Jacobsen and released as a single. The editors of Billboard magazine predicted that "Don't Make Promises" would reach the Hot 100, but neither song charted. "Misty Roses" was also paired on a single with "Black Sheep Boy", a song from his 1967 album Tim Hardin 2. Again, neither song charted.

=== Critical reception ===
In their review of the "Black Sheep Boy" single, the editors of Cash Box magazine described "Misty Roses" as a "shuffling blueser". In a retrospective review, Matthew Greenwald of AllMusic wrote,

"Misty Roses" seems to be an attempt by Tim Hardin to write a "standard", although his organic writing habits were never contrived or pointed at a style. Either way, the end result is certainly a successful jazz/bossa nova fusion, resulting in a song that is not unlike Antonio Carlos Jobim's classic work, crossed with a folk vibe.

"Misty Roses"

Single by Johnny Mathis

from the album Up, Up and Away
- A-side: "Don't Talk to Me"
- Released: August 15, 1967
- Recorded: May 15, 1967
- Genre: Easy Listening
- Label: Columbia
- Songwriter: Tim Hardin
- Producer: Robert Mersey

Johnny Mathis singles chronology
"Two Tickets and a Candy Heart" (1967)	"Don't Talk to Me" / "Misty Roses" (1967)	"Venus" (1968)

Music video
- "Misty Roses" on YouTube

== Johnny Mathis version ==
Johnny Mathis recorded "Misty Roses" on May 15, 1967, with an orchestra conducted by Robert Mersey, who also produced the recording. It was paired with another song from the session, "Don't Talk to Me", and released as a single three months later, on August 15. "Misty Roses" was included on his 1967 album Up, Up and Away.

=== Chart performance ===
Mathis's recording of the song debuted on Billboard magazine's Easy Listening chart in the issue dated September 16, 1967, and got as high as number 40 during its two weeks there.

=== Critical reception ===
In their review column, the editors of Cash Box magazine gave the song a letter grade of B+. Following similar comments in their review of "Don't Talk to Me", they wrote, "More lush, loving sound." In their review of the Up, Up and Away album, the editors of Billboard wrote that "Misty Roses" was one of the songs that was "soothed and coated with Mathis's seamless style – music running together like prefabricated daydreams padded with a feeling of luxury".

In his 2022 book Misty: The Music of Johnny Mathis, Jacob Baekgaard wrote,

If "Misty" was the iconic song of his classic pop sound, then "Misty Roses", written by the folk singer/songwriter Tim Hardin, proved that Mathis was ready to change with the times and explore a modern pop expression, which nevertheless kept his sophisticated approach to songs intact.

=== Charts ===
Weekly chart performance for "Misty Roses" by Johnny Mathis
Chart (1967)	Peak position
US Billboard Easy Listening	40

== Cover versions ==
"Misty Roses" was one of Hardin's most covered songs. Cash Box magazine editors highlighted various versions in reviews of the albums or singles on which they appear. Sonny Bono's recording received a B+ from the editors, who described it as "[s]low, soft samba". Regarding the 5th Dimension's album Up, Up and Away, they wrote, "Powerful vocals with groovy backing make tracks like … 'Misty Roses' Grade-A." In their review of the Misty Roses album by the Sandpipers, the editors of Billboard described the title song as "a winner".

AllMusic critics praised renditions of the song retrospectively. Matthew Greenwald described Bobby Darin's version on his 1966 album If I Were a Carpenter as a "standout" in the list of covers. Richie Unterberger reviewed Astrud Gilberto's 1967 album Beach Samba and wrote that "some of the pop choices work well, particularly Tim Hardin's gorgeous 'Misty Roses'". In a review of Colin Blunstone's Live at the BBC, Robin Platts wrote of the 1971 recording, "This 'Misty Roses' is actually superior to the studio take (on One Year)." Michael G. Nastos wrote that the Modern Jazz Quartet's 1972 album The Legendary Profile included "a long, tender, Latin flavored version of Tim Hardin's 'Misty Roses' in as foggy a mood as possible".

== Bibliography ==
- Baekgaard, Jacob (2022), Misty: The Music of Johnny Mathis, Sonicbond Publishing Limited, ISBN 978-1-789-52247-1
