= The Holy Land (album) =

Studio album by Johnny Cash
- Released: January 6, 1969
- Recorded: 1968
- Venue: Various Holy Land sites
- Studio: Columbia (Nashville, Tennessee)
- Genre: Gospel; country gospel
- Length: 43:43
- Label: Columbia
- Producer: Bob Johnston

Johnny Cash chronology
Heart of Cash (1968)	The Holy Land (1969)	At San Quentin (1969)

Singles from The Holy Land
- 1. "Daddy Sang Bass" Released: November 6, 1968

The Holy Land is a concept album, the third gospel album and eighteenth overall album by country singer Johnny Cash, released on Columbia Records in 1969. He recorded the album inspired by a visit to Israel and the West Bank (the Holy Land of the title) with his wife, June Carter Cash and in fact most of the album consists of on-site recordings made by Cash using a portable tape recorder during a visit describing what he sees as he visits holy sites in and around Jerusalem. The remainder of the album consists of gospel songs. The album was completed at Columbia Studios in Nashville, Tennessee, where overdubs were added to some of the on-site recordings and remaining songs were recorded. This album features the final Cash recordings made with original Tennessee Two lead guitarist Luther Perkins before Perkins' death.

All but three of the songs were written by Cash, though the sole single, "Daddy Sang Bass", which reached No. 1 on the Country charts and remained that spot for six weeks, was penned by Carl Perkins.

The cover has a picture of Cash standing in front of the chapel on top of the Mount of Beatitudes, immediately north of the Sea of Galilee. Some versions of the album had a 3-D picture on the cover.

The album has been released on CD through Harmony Records in 1999 and later by Columbia as part of the Johnny Cash: The Complete Columbia Album Collection box set in 2012.

The concept of Cash visiting Biblical locations and combining storytelling with music would be revisited twice more in his career for the 1973 soundtrack album The Gospel Road and the 2000 release Return to the Promised Land.

Professional ratings
Review scores
Source	Rating
Allmusic	link

== Track listing ==
All tracks composed by Johnny Cash, except where indicated.

No.	Title	Writer(s)	Length
1.	"Prologue" (narrative)		0:54
2.	"Land of Israel"		2:50
3.	"Mother's Love" (narrative)		1:32
4.	"This Is Nazareth" (narrative)		0:43
5.	"Nazarene"		2:03
6.	"Town of Cana" (narrative)		1:36
7.	"He Turned the Water into Wine"		2:47
8.	"My Wife June at the Sea of Galilee" (narrative by June Carter Cash)		1:32
9.	"Beautiful Words" (narrative with sung interjection by Cash)		1:52
10.	"Our Guide Jacob at Mount Tabor" (narrative interview)		1:54
11.	"The Ten Commandments"	Lew DeWitt	3:59
12.	"Daddy Sang Bass"	Carl Perkins	2:19
13.	"At the Wailing Wall" (narrative)		0:46
14.	"Come to the Wailing Wall"		2:49
15.	"In Bethlehem" (narrative)		1:46
16.	"In Garden of Gethsemane" (narrative)		1:57
17.	"The Fourth Man"	Arthur "Guitar Boogie" Smith	2:08
18.	"On the Via Delorosa" (narrative)		3:54
19.	"Church of the Holy Sepulchre" (narrative)		1:06
20.	"At Calvary" (narrative)		3:33
21.	"God is Not Dead"		2:45

== Personnel ==
- Johnny Cash - vocals, guitar
- The Carter Family, Jan Howard, The Statler Brothers - backing vocals
- Luther Perkins, Carl Perkins - electric guitar
- Marshall Grant - bass guitar
- W.S. Holland - drums

=== Additional personnel ===
- Charlie Bragg - engineer
- Bob Johnston - producer

== Charts ==
Album – Billboard (United States)

Year	Chart	Position
1969	Country Albums	6
1969	Top LPs	54

Singles – Billboard (United States)

Year	Single	Chart	Position
1968	"Daddy Sang Bass"	Country Singles	1
