= See Ruby Fall =

Song by Johnny Cash

Single by Johnny Cash

from the album Hello, I'm Johnny Cash
- A-side: "See Ruby Fall" "Blistered"
- Released: 1969
- Genre: country
- Label: Columbia 4-45020
- Songwriters: Johnny Cash or Johnny Cash and Roy Orbison
- Producer: Bob Johnston

Audio
- "See Ruby Fall" on YouTube

"See Ruby Fall" is a song co-written by Johnny Cash and Roy Orbison. The title is a play on the phrase "See Ruby Falls", which is painted on some Southern barn roofs to direct potential tourists to a well-known waterfall in Chattanooga.

Recorded by Cash at the Columbia Studios in Nashville, Tennessee, on August 20, 1969, the song was released as a single (Columbia 4-45020, with "Blistered" that was recorded two days earlier on the opposite side) in October.

On U.S. Billboard's country chart, the single charted as a double-A-side, reaching #4. On the Hot 100, "Blistered" reached #50, and "See Ruby Fall" #75. (according to some sources, both songs reached #50).

Both "Blistered" and "See Ruby Fall" were later included on Johnny Cash's album Hello, I'm Johnny Cash, released in January 1970.

== Analysis ==
Cash and Roy Orbison collaborated on "See Ruby Fall," from Cash's Hello, I'm Johnny Cash album, after seeing a billboard in Tennessee that read "See Ruby Falls." Ruby Falls is a waterfall in Chattanooga, Tennessee. They took that hook and turned it into a song of frustration, as you watch someone you love drift further and further away from you. The narrator admits that he knew someday Ruby would leave him for a more exciting life than the one he could provide for her. She certainly did, as he explains that she can now be found under the red light downtown. It's a brutally frank song without a happy ending for the singer. It was released as the B-side of "Blistered."

— John M. Alexander. The Man in Song: A Discographic Biography of Johnny Cash

The B-side of the first single ("Blistered") [from the album Hello, I'm Johnny Cash (1970)] was a song Cash co-wrote with Roy Orbison called "See Ruby Fall." Inspired by signs they saw painted on barn roofs in Chattanooga urging travelers to visit the local attraction Ruby Falls, Cash and Orbison used the phrase to weave together the story of a love gone wrong. The singer knows his other half is on her way out of the door, so he lets her go, only to tell someone else where he can find her. It's classic country love-gone-wrong, covered up a bit by the almost ragtime piano that lessens the emotional impact of the song.

— C. Eric Banister. Johnny Cash FAQ: All That's Left to Know About the Man in Black

== Track listing ==
7" single (Columbia 4-45020, 1969)
No.	Title	Writer(s)	Length
1.	"See Ruby Fall"	J. Cash	2:48
2.	"Blistered"	B. E. Wheeler	2:18

== Charts ==
Chart (1969)	Peak position
ERROR in "Billboardhot100": Invalid position: 50 or 75. Expected number 1–200 or dash (–).
US Hot Country Songs (Billboard)	4
