= This Is Tim Hardin =

Studio album by Tim Hardin
- Released: September 1967
- Recorded: c. 1964
- Genre: Folk
- Label: Atco
- Producer: Daniel N. Flickinger

Tim Hardin chronology
| Tim Hardin 2 (1967) | This Is Tim Hardin (1967) | Tim Hardin 3 Live in Concert (1968) |

This Is Tim Hardin is an album by folk and blues artist Tim Hardin released in 1967 in mono and stereo by Atco Records, a subsidiary of Atlantic Records which released it on cd in 1998.

These recordings from 1963 and 1964 predate his better known Verve albums and were not issued until after the success of those albums. The songs are in a more straight forward blues style than his later folk, rock and pop styles and are a mix of traditional songs, contemporary blues and his own songs including the driving "Fast Freight" and "I Can't Slow Down".

== Reception ==
Professional ratings
Review scores
| Source | Rating |
|---|---|
| Allmusic | 4.5/5 stars |

In his review for Allmusic, music critic Richie Unterberger wrote "The material isn't nearly as distinctive as the best of Hardin's work, but the performances rank with Dave Van Ronk and Fred Neil as the best white blues/acoustic folk to emerge from the early-'60s Greenwich scene. It's still well worth tracking down."

== Track listing ==
=== Side one ===
1. "I Can't Slow Down" (Tim Hardin) – 3:28
2. "Blues on the Ceilin'" (Fred Neil) – 3:56
3. "Stagger Lee" (author unknown) – 3:11
4. "(I'm Your) Hoochie Coochie Man" (Willie Dixon) – 4:20
5. "I've Been Working on the Railroad" (author unknown) – 1:51

=== Side two ===
1. "House of the Rising Sun" (author unknown) – 4:09
2. "Fast Freight" (Terry Gilkyson, Hardin) – 4:05
3. "Cocaine Bill" (author unknown) – 2:55
4. "You Got to Have More Than One Woman" (Tim Hardin) – 2:01
5. "Danville Dame" (Hardin, Steve Weber) – 2:05

== Personnel ==
- Tim Hardin – vocals and guitar
