= Don't Talk to Me =

- Sheet music cover (1967)

Single by Johnny Mathis
- B-side: "Misty Roses"
- Released: August 15, 1967
- Recorded: May 15, 1967
- Genre: Easy listening
- Length: 3:14
- Label: Columbia
- Songwriters: Bert Kaempfert; Herbert Rehbein; Milt Gabler
- Producer: Robert Mersey

Johnny Mathis singles chronology
"Two Tickets and a Candy Heart" (1967)	"Don't Talk to Me" / "Misty Roses" (1967)	"Venus" (1968)

Music video
- "Don't Talk to Me" on YouTube

"Don't Talk to Me" is a popular song written by Bert Kaempfert, Herbert Rehbein and Milt Gabler that was recorded by Johnny Mathis in 1967. It was a moderate Easy Listening hit.

== Recording and release ==
Johnny Mathis recorded "Don't Talk to Me" on May 15, 1967, with an orchestra conducted by Robert Mersey, who also produced the recording. It was released as a single three months later, on August 15.

== Chart performance ==
"Don't Talk to Me" debuted on Billboard magazine's Easy Listening chart in the issue dated September 9, 1967, and got as high as number 21 during its five weeks there.

== Critical reception ==
The reviews in the music industry trade magazines noted that this was Mathis's first single for Columbia Records upon his return from a four-year stay at Mercury. In their review column, the editors of Cash Box magazine featured the single as one of their Best Bets, which was their equivalent to a letter grade of A for "Don't Talk to Me". They wrote, "Back to his old romantic stylings, Johnny Mathis makes a solid debut under his old banner with a gorgeous ballad from the winning pen of Bert Kaempfert." The editors of Billboard wrote, "The return to Columbia for Mathis is an exceptional one. The beautiful Bert Kaempfert ballad serves as strong commercial material with the feel and flavor of the early Mathis success."

== Charts ==
Weekly chart performance for "Don't Talk to Me"
Chart (1967)	Peak position
US Billboard Easy Listening	21
