= Ira Stanphill =

American gospel music songwriter

Ira F. Stanphill
- Born: Ira Forest Stanphill; February 14, 1914; Bellview, New Mexico
- Died: December 30, 1993 (aged 79); Overland Park, Kansas
- Occupations: Composer evangelist minister singer
- Known for: Writing hymns and Southern gospel songs

Ira Forest Stanphill (February 14, 1914 – December 30, 1993) was a well-known American gospel music songwriter of the mid-twentieth century.

== Early years ==
Ira Stanphill was born in Bellview, New Mexico. Stanphill's parents were Andrew Crittenton Stanphill and Maggie Flora Engler Stanphill. He and his family spent most of his younger years in Coffeyville, Kansas. He was saved when he was 12, and he graduated high school in 1932. He was called to preach soon after graduating Chillicothe (Missouri) Junior College at age 22.

== Ministry ==
On April 28, 1939, the Southern Missouri District Council of the Assemblies of God ordained Stanphill to the gospel ministry.

=== Churches ===
Stanphill began preaching when he was 22, first in a summer traveling ministry with Christ Ambassadors (CA’s) of the Assemblies of God, then becoming director of youth and music at a church in Breckenridge, Texas. He later became music director at Faith Tabernacle in Oklahoma City, then became pastor of Trinity Assembly of God in Orange, California. In the early 1940s, he served as associate pastor at Full Gospel Tabernacle in Bakersfield, California. In 1949, he became music director at Bethel Temple in Fort Worth, Texas.

In 1956, he was the founding pastor of Bethel Assembly of God Church in Lake Worth, Florida. In September 1962, he became pastor of the Assembly of God Church in Lancaster, Pennsylvania. In 1968, he was pastor of Rosen Heights Assembly of God Church in Fort Worth, Texas where he oversaw the construction of a new building and the re-naming of the church to Rockwood Park Assembly of God. After serving 13 years as pastor of Rockwood Park, he resigned to devote more time to evangelism and concerts.

=== Evangelistic activities ===
Stanphill was an evangelist, traveling to churches and Bible camps around the country, sometimes accompanied by his wife. They played and sang some of his compositions in addition to his preaching. In 1941, they joined the team of evangelist Raymond T. Richey. An ad for a crusade Stanphill held in 1964 described him as "Preacher of Old Time Religion." In addition to traveling throughout the United States, he preached in 40 other countries.

Occasionally as part of his crusades, he would ask members of the congregation to suggest titles for songs. Selecting one title from the suggestions, he would write words and music for a song during the service.

=== Broadcasting ===
In the 1970s, Stanphill's ministry included a 30-minute weekly television program originally produced in 1973 by the Christian Broadcasting Network at KXTX-TV (channel 33) in Dallas and later called "Young at Heart" produced by WCFC in Chicago. In the 1990s, he appeared on several Southern gospel music videos produced by Bill Gaither. Those episodes (and others) included some of Stanphill's songs.

=== Book ===
Stanphill was the author of the book This Side of Heaven.

== Movie ==
The independent film This Side of Heaven, based on Stanphill's life, was produced in 1987 and was shot in and around the Dallas, Texas area.

== Music ==
By the age of 10, Stanphill had already become a fluent musician, having learned to play the piano, organ, ukulele, and accordion. He went on to learn to play xylophone, guitar, saxophone, and clarinet. At 17, he was composing and performing his own music for church services, revival campaigns, and prayer meetings.

As a singer evangelist, Stanphill traveled the United States and Canada extensively and around the world to 40 countries over his career to preach and perform his music. Many famous secular singers have performed his works, such as Elvis Presley ("Mansion Over the Hilltop") and Johnny Cash ("Suppertime"). "I Know Who Holds Tomorrow", "I Walk with His Hand in Mine", and "We'll Talk It Over" are a few of his titles that are familiar and still performed today.

Stanphill composed more than 500 gospel songs. Recordings of his composition Mansion Over the Hilltop sold more than 2 million copies, and some of his songs have been translated into other languages. “Room at the Cross” is still sung and is in many hymnals.

Stanphill founded Hymntime Publishers, Inc., and was the company's president.

== Songs by Ira Stanphill ==
| Year | Title |
|---|---|
| 1946 | Room At The Cross For You |
| | God Can Do Anything But Fail |
| | Jesus And Me |
| 1949 | Mansion Over The Hilltop |
| | Thirty Pieces Of Silver |
| | We'll Talk It Over |
| 1950 | I Know Who Holds Tomorrow |
| | Suppertime (Note: Your explanatory text hereOriginally recorded and released as a single in 1953 by Jimmie Davis with Anita Kerr Singers. The song has been artists such as Johnny Cash (in 1958), Jim Reeves (1959), Faron Young (1959), Porter Wagoner (1968), Burl Ives (1969), Conway Twitty (1973), and Pat Boone (1973).) |
| 1951 | Beyond Tomorrow |
| 1952 | A Crown Of Thorns |
| 1953 | Follow Me |
| | Just Tell Them When You Saw Me I Was On My Way |
| 1954 | Inside Those Pearly Gates |
| 1955 | He Washed My Eyes With Tears |
| 1958 | I Walk With His Hand In Mine |
| 1959 | Unworthy |
| 1961 | The Choice Is Mine |
| 1968 | Happiness Is The Lord |
| 1972 | If I've Forgotten Today |
| 1975 | Give Me A Love Like This |
| | Someone Forgot |
| 1977 | Rocky Road |

Source: Christian Copyright Licensing (CCLI) website, searched 6 March 2018

== Honors ==
Stanphill was inducted into the Gospel Music Hall of Fame (GMA) in 1981, and the Southern Gospel Music Association (SGMA) Hall of Fame in 2001. He also received an honorary PhD from Hyles-Anderson College in Hammond, Indiana.

== Family ==
On April 23, 1939, Stanphill married Zelma Lawson, a minister's daughter who "played piano by ear and accompanied her parents on a local radio program." That marriage ended in divorce October 7, 1948. Stanphill and Zelma had a son, Ray. On June 7, 1951, following Zelma's death in an automobile accident, he married his second wife, Gloria Holloway. They had two daughters, Judy and Cathy.

Stanphill’s daughter Cathy married Rick Cole, a pastor and son of prominent Pentecostal leader Glen D. Cole. Together, they had three children: sons Nate Cole and Travis, and a daughter, Laine. Nate, the eldest, became notable in the contemporary Christian music scene as a member of the Billboard-charting, gold-certified Christian pop boy band Plus One. The group, signed to Atlantic Records in the early 2000s, gained widespread recognition in both Christian and mainstream pop music circles. With multiple chart-topping singles and albums, Plus One toured internationally and was often compared to secular acts like NSYNC and Backstreet Boys for their vocal harmonies and broad appeal. Nate Cole’s contributions as a lead vocalist helped bring Christian-themed pop music to a younger, wider audience during the band’s peak.

In 2025, Nate honored his grandfather’s musical legacy by covering several of Ira Stanphill’s classic hymns. His album ‘‘The Biblical Way’’ featured a rendition of “Suppertime,” while his version of “Room at the Cross” (shortened from its original title, Room at the Cross for You) was released as a single a few weeks later. Through these recordings, Nate introduced a new generation to the enduring power of his grandfather’s gospel songwriting.

== Brain tumor ==
In 1976, Stanphill was diagnosed with "a malignant tumor in the right front quadrant of the brain." He underwent successful surgery, living for 17 more years.

== Death ==
Stanphill died of a heart attack December 30, 1993, in Overland Park, Kansas, less than two months shy of his 80th birthday. He was interred in Johnson County Memorial Gardens, Johnson County, Kansas.
