= Tim Hardin 1 =

Studio album by Tim Hardin
- Released: July 1966
- Recorded: May & November 1964, December 1965
- Genre: Folk rock
- Length: 27:21
- Label: Verve Forecast
- Producer: Erik Jacobsen

Tim Hardin chronology
Tim Hardin 1 (1966)	Tim Hardin 2 (1967)

Tim Hardin 1 is the debut album by folk artist Tim Hardin, released in 1966 on Verve Records.

== History ==
Tim Hardin 1 contains one of his most well-known and frequently covered songs, "Reason to Believe"—a notable hit for Rod Stewart in 1971. Some of the songs were demos that ended up on the final release. After principal recording was completed, string arrangements were overdubbed onto some of the tracks without Hardin's consent. Hardin said he was so upset that he cried when he first heard the recordings.

The album photography was shot by Lisa Law (credited as Lisa Bachelis) in the garden of her home, which was known as "The Castle" and where Bob Dylan was staying at the time. One of the outtakes of this shoot was used for the retrospective, Hang on a to a Dream: The Verve Recordings.

Tim Hardin 1 was re-released on CD in 1998 by Repertoire along with Tim Hardin 2.

It was voted number 711 in the third edition of Colin Larkin's All Time Top 1000 Albums (2000).

== Reception ==
Professional ratings
Review scores
Source	Rating
AllMusic	4.5/5 stars
Encyclopedia of Popular Music	5/5 stars

Allmusic stated in their review: "Tim Hardin 1 is one of the most powerful and compelling records of its era... The result is a seminal folk-rock album, every bit as exciting and urgent as it was in 1966, and as important a creative effort as Bob Dylan's Bringing It All Back Home and Highway 61 Revisited. And this wasn't even Hardin's best album, though it set the pattern for everything he did after."

== Track listing ==
All songs written by Tim Hardin; except where noted

Side one

1. "Don't Make Promises" – 2:26
2. "Green Rocky Road" (Traditional, with lyrics by Len Chandler and Robert Kaufman) – 2:18
3. "Smugglin' Man" – 1:57
4. "How Long" – 2:54
5. "While You're On Your Way" – 2:17
6. "It'll Never Happen Again" – 2:37

Side two

1. "Reason to Believe" – 2:00
2. "Never Too Far" – 2:16
3. "Part of the Wind" – 2:19
4. "Ain't Gonna Do Without" – 2:13
5. "Misty Roses" – 2:00
6. "How Can We Hang On to a Dream" – 2:04

== Personnel ==
- Tim Hardin – vocals, guitar, keyboards
- Bob Bushnell, Walter Yost – bass guitar
- Earl Palmer, Buddy Saltzman, Jon Wilcox – drums
- Gary Burton, Phil Kraus – vibraphone
- John Sebastian – harmonica
- Artie Butler – string arrangements

Technical

- Val Valentin – engineer
- Lisa Bachelis – photography
