= Suppertime (Jimmie Davis song) =

1953 song by Jimmie Davis

"Supper-Time"

Single by Jimmie Davis with Anita Kerr Singers
- B-side: "To My Mansion in the Sky"
- Released: 1953
- Genre: Gospel
- Label: Decca 28799
- Songwriter: Ira Stanphill

"Supper-Time" (alternatively written "Suppertime" and "Supper Time") is a song written by American evangelist Ira Stanphill and popularized by Jimmie Davis.

== Content ==
It is a sentimental gospel song. In the words of Colin Edward Woodward, the author of the book Country Boy: The Roots of Johnny Cash, the lyrics speak about "the 'great suppertime' in the afterlife, where families break bread with Jesus."

The song has been characterized as "meaningful and simple".

== Release ==
The song was originally recorded and released as a single in 1953 by Jimmie Davis, with Anita Kerr Singers. Davis's version has been called a classic. He counted it among his favorites and frequently performed.

Moreover, American Songwriter credits this song for Davis's interest in the gospel genre. According to the magazine, when Davis found that "songs like [this] appealed to gospel listeners", "he began recording and releasing sacred songs."

== Covers ==
"Suppertime"

Song by Johnny Cash

from the album The Fabulous Johnny Cash
- Released: 1958
- Recorded: 1958
- Label: Columbia

Audio
- "Suppertime" on YouTube

The song has been covered by many artists, including Johnny Cash (in 1958), Jim Reeves (1959), Faron Young (1959), Porter Wagoner (1968), Burl Ives (1969), Conway Twitty (1973), and Pat Boone (1973).

As noted by Colin Edward Woodward in his book Country Boy: The Roots of Johnny Cash, Cash effectively made the song his own. He performed it live "for years", and in his interpretation it sounded like he wrote it himself. He explains that Cash preferred to conclude his live performances "with a tune that was not only nostalgic but spiritual", and this song, "with its message of the goodness of going home", suited well for this purpose.

== Charts ==
Jimmie Davis version

Chart (1953)	Peak position
US Billboard Most Programed Sacred Records	9
