= Daddy Sang Bass =

Song

Single by Johnny Cash

from the album The Holy Land
- B-side: "He Turned the Water Into Wine"
- Released: 6 November 1968
- Studio: Columbia (Nashville, Tennessee)
- Genre: Country, gospel
- Length: 2:19
- Label: Columbia, 4-44689
- Songwriter: Carl Perkins
- Producer: Bob Johnston

Johnny Cash singles chronology
"Folsom Prison Blues" (1968)	"Daddy Sang Bass" (1968)	"A Boy Named Sue" (1969)

"Daddy Sang Bass" is a song written by Carl Perkins, with lines from the chorus of "Will the Circle Be Unbroken?" and recorded by American country music singer Johnny Cash. It was released in November 1968 as the first single from the album The Holy Land. The song was Cash's sixty-first release on the country chart, going on to No. 1 on the Billboard country chart for 6 weeks and spending a total of 19 weeks there. The single reached No. 56 on the Cashbox pop singles chart in 1969. "Daddy Sang Bass" was also released on the Columbia Records Hall of Fame Series as a 45, #13-33153, b/w "Folsom Prison Blues" (live version). The record was nominated in the CMA awards category of Single of the Year by the Country Music Association (CMA) in 1969.

"Daddy Sang Bass" was Cash's thirty-sixth entry on the pop charts and the last before his "A Boy Named Sue" became his first and only top ten hit there. No other act has ever started off a pop career with a longer such drought, as regards the number of singles on the pop charts, that was finally broken. For comparison, Bobby Helms currently has the longest drought, as regards the time length between first appearance on the Hot 100 and first top ten there, achieved on January 5, 2019, after waiting 60 years, four months and two weeks.

The song appeared originally on the 1969 album The Holy Land, the 1971 Johnny Cash: Greatest Hits, Vol. 2 collection, the 1999 Johnny Cash greatest hits compilation 16 Biggest Hits, and the 2002 The Essential Johnny Cash collection.

According to Johnny Cash's book, The Man in Black, the singer overcame his amphetamine addiction by finding God and then helped his friend and frequent tour-mate Carl Perkins to overcome his alcoholism. Feeling inspired, Perkins wrote the song "Daddy Sang Bass" in 1967. Cash says the line "Me and little brother will join right in there" was written about Cash's brother Jack, who died when they were both boys. In the song the line is sung by Don Reid and Lew DeWitt of The Statler Brothers who are uncredited on the record, as is Jan Howard, who sang the line "Mama sang tenor" also in the song's chorus. Howard's part is frequently incorrectly credited to June Carter, who would sing the line in concert with Cash.

Carl Perkins also recorded the song for his 1969 Greatest Hits compilation album on Columbia Records, which became a Top 40 hit on the Billboard country album chart that year.

The line "Daddy sang bass" is sampled in They Might Be Giants' song "Boat of Car" from their self-titled debut album.

== Chart performance ==
Chart (1968–1969)	Peak position
US Hot Country Songs (Billboard)	1
US Billboard Hot 100	42
U.S. Cashbox Top 100 Singles	56
Canadian RPM Country Tracks	1
Canadian RPM Top Singles	49

== Cover versions ==
- Rex Allen
- Glen Campbell on the 1970 Capitol album Oh Happy Day.
- Dolly Parton, Mel Tillis, and Porter Wagoner on a 1969 episode of The Porter Wagoner Show
- Kitty Wells on the 1969 album Guilty Street.
- Skeeter Davis on the 1969 album Mary Frances.
- The Statler Brothers (who also performed the song on The Johnny Cash Show with Johnny Cash and June Carter Cash)
- The Oak Ridge Boys
- Homer and Jethro released a parody of the song entitled "Daddy Played First Base" which was nominated for a Grammy for Best Comedy Recording in 1970
- Maury Finney as a 45 single on Boss Records, 225.
- Gospel Echoes Quartet
- Linda Gail Lewis with Carl Perkins on The Jerry Lee Lewis Show TV special, 1971
- The Rhythm Masters
- Dailey & Vincent on the 2012 album "The Gospel Site of Dailey and Vincent"
- Leon Russell on the 1998 album Legend in My Time - Hank Wilson Vol. III
- J. D. Sumner and the Stamps on the 1974 Vintage Gospel album (Skylite Records/SLP-6144)
- Sego Brothers and Naomi as a 45 single on Songs of Faith Records, 2001.
- Jean Shepard
- Connie Smith
- Carl Story on his 1969 eponymous LP, Starday Records, SLP 438
- Nat Stuckey
- Jackie Thompson as a 45 single on Columbia Records, 4-44842.
- Mel Tillis, Who's Julie (1969), Big 'n Country (1970), Detroit City (1973)
- Bryan Chalker's New Frontier as a 45 single on the UK Chapter 1 label, SCH170.
- Voiceplay as a single in 2018.
- Jason Mraz, Grandma's Gospel Favorites, 2026
