= The Johnny Cash Show (album) =

Live album by Johnny Cash
- Released: October 19, 1970
- Recorded: July 10, 1970
- Venue: Ryman Auditorium, Nashville, Tennessee
- Genre: Country
- Length: 28:32
- Label: Columbia
- Producer: Bob Johnston

Johnny Cash chronology
The World of Johnny Cash (1970)	The Johnny Cash Show (1970)	I Walk the Line (1970)

Singles from The Johnny Cash Show
- 1. "Sunday Morning Coming Down" Released: July 29, 1970

Professional ratings
Review scores
Source	Rating
Allmusic	4/5 stars

The Johnny Cash Show is a 1970 live album by American country singer Johnny Cash, recorded at the Grand Ole Opry House and released on Columbia Records in 1970 as a tie-in with Cash's then-current TV series of the same title. Though one of Cash's lesser-known live records, it spawned the highly successful single "Sunday Mornin' Comin' Down", which helped kickstart the career of singer-songwriter Kris Kristofferson. The song and album reached number 1 on the Country charts. It was Cash's final chart entry in Australia, going no higher than number 35. The album was certified Gold on February 16, 1995, by the RIAA.

== Track listing ==
1. "Sunday Morning Coming Down" (Kris Kristofferson) – 4:04
2. "Come Along and Ride This Train" (Cash) – 6:16
  "Six Days on the Road" (Earl Green, Carl Montgomery)
  "There Ain't No Easy Run" (Tom T. Hall, Dave Dudley)
  "Sailor on a Concrete Sea" (Merle Travis)
3. "These Hands" (Eddie Noack) – 3:45
4. "I'm Gonna Try to Be That Way" (Cash) – 3:24
5. "Come Along and Ride This Train" (Cash) – 8:04
  "Mississippi Delta Land" (Harlan Howard)
  "Detroit City" (Mel Tillis, Danny Dill)
  "Uncloudy Day" (Joshua K. Alwood)
  "No Setting Sun" (Ruth Davis)
  "Mississippi Delta Land"
6. "Here Was a Man" (Johnny Bond, Tex Ritter) – 2:56

== Personnel ==
- Johnny Cash – vocals, acoustic guitar
- The Carter Family – background vocals
- The Statler Brothers – background vocals
- Marshall Grant – bass guitar
- W. S. Holland – drums
- Bob Wootton – electric guitar
- Carl Perkins – electric guitar
- Norman Blake – acoustic guitar
- Bill Walker – orchestra leader

== Additional personnel ==
- Produced by Bob Johnston
- Arranged and conducted by Bill Walker
- "These Hands" Arranged by Barry McDonald
- Engineering: Neil Wilburn
- Cover Photo: John Burg

== Charts ==
Album – Billboard (United States)

Year	Chart	Position
1970	Country Albums	1
1970	Top LPs	44

Singles – Billboard (United States)

Year	Single	Chart	Position
1970	"Sunday Mornin' Comin' Down"	Country Singles	1
1970	"Sunday Mornin' Comin' Down"	Pop Singles	46
