= Tim Hardin 2 =

Studio album by Tim Hardin
- Released: April 1967
- Recorded: November 1964 – August 1966
- Genre: Folk
- Length: 22:38
- Label: Verve Forecast
- Producer: Charles Koppelman, Don Rubin

Tim Hardin chronology
Tim Hardin 1 (1966)	Tim Hardin 2 (1967)	This Is Tim Hardin (1967)

Tim Hardin 2 is the second album by folk artist Tim Hardin, released in 1967.

== History ==
The original LP release has a long poem on the back cover by Hardin titled "A Question of Birth..."

Tim Hardin 2 contains Hardin's most popular and much-covered composition "If I Were a Carpenter", most notably by Bobby Darin, whose version peaked at No. 8 in the US and No. 9 in the UK in 1966.

Tim Hardin 2 was re-released on CD in 1998 by Repertoire along with Tim Hardin 1.

== Reception ==
Professional ratings
Review scores
Source	Rating
AllMusic	4.5/5 stars
Encyclopedia of Popular Music	5/5 stars

In his review for AllMusic, music critic Richie Unterberger wrote "Tim Hardin 2 is probably his best single album, on which he eschewed blues nearly entirely and forged a distinctive folk-rock voice..."

It was voted number 430 in the third edition of Colin Larkin's All Time Top 1000 Albums (2000).

== Track listing ==
All songs written by Tim Hardin.

=== Side one ===
1. "If I Were a Carpenter" – 2:41
2. "Red Balloon" – 2:37
3. "Black Sheep Boy" – 1:58
4. "The Lady Came from Baltimore" – 1:49
5. "Baby Close Its Eyes" – 1:52

=== Side two ===
1. "You Upset the Grace of Living When You Lie" – 1:47
2. "Speak Like a Child" – 3:15
3. "See Where You Are and Get Out" – 1:12
4. "It's Hard to Believe in Love for Long" – 2:17
5. "Tribute to Hank Williams" – 3:10

== Personnel ==
- Tim Hardin – vocals, guitar, keyboards
- Don Peake – arranger
- Other musicians uncredited

== Production notes ==
- Produced by Charles Koppelman and Don Rubin
- Jerry Schoenbaum – production supervision
- Val Valentin – director of engineering
- Engineered by Doc Siegel
- Cover design by David Krieger
- Cover photo by Marshall Harmon
