= The Lady Came from Baltimore =

1967 song by Tim Hardin

"The Lady Came from Baltimore" (sometimes shown as "Lady Came from Baltimore") is a song written by American singer-songwriter Tim Hardin who recorded and released it as a track on his album Tim Hardin 2 in 1967. The song was inspired by Hardin's relationship with his wife, Susan Yardley Morss, who acted under the name Susan Yardley and who came from a prosperous family in Baltimore who disapproved of the relationship; Hardin's lyrics refer to "Susan Moore".

== Other versions ==
Bobby Darin recorded the song before Hardin's own version was released. Darin's recording reached number 62 on the Billboard Hot 100 in April 1967. Other artists who recorded the song include Rick Nelson, on his 1969 album Live at The Troubador. Joan Baez, on her 1967 album Joan, and Scott Walker, on his debut solo album Scott. The song was also performed by Bob Dylan on tour in 1992 and 1994.

=== Johnny Cash version ===
"The Lady Came from Baltimore"

Single by Johnny Cash

from the album John R. Cash
- B-side: "Lonesome to the Bone"
- Released: 1974
- Genre: Country
- Label: Columbia 3-10066
- Songwriter: Tim Hardin
- Producer: Gary Klein

Johnny Cash singles chronology
"Father and Daughter (Father and Son)" (1974)	"The Lady Came from Baltimore" (1974)	"My Old Kentucky Home (Turpentine and Dandelion Wine)" (1975)

Audio
- "The Lady Came from Baltimore" on YouTube

Johnny Cash's cover of the song was released as a single in 1974 and was subsequently included on his 1975 album John R. Cash. The song on the B side was "Lonesome to the Bone" penned by Cash himself. The single peaked at number 14 on US Billboard's country chart for the week of February 8, 1975.

==== Track listing ====
7" single (Columbia 3-10066, 1974)
No.	Title	Writer(s)	Length
1.	"The Lady Came from Baltimore"	T. Hardin	2:44
2.	"Lonesome to the Bone"	J. Cash	2:27

==== Charts: Johnny Cash version ====
Chart (1974)	Peak position
US Hot Country Songs (Billboard)	14
