= If I Were a Carpenter (song) =

1960s song by Tim Hardin

- 1970 Norwegian re-release

Song by Tim Hardin

from the album Tim Hardin 2
- Released: April 1967
- Genre: Folk
- Length: 2:41
- Label: Verve Forecast
- Songwriter: Tim Hardin
- Producers: Charles Koppelman, Don Rubin

"If I Were a Carpenter" is a folk song written by Tim Hardin in the 1960s, and re-recorded with commercial success by various artists including Bobby Darin, The Four Tops and Johnny Cash. Hardin's own recording of the piece appeared on his 1967 album Tim Hardin 2. It was one of two songs from that release (the other being "Misty Roses") performed by Hardin at Woodstock in 1969. The song, believed by some to be about male romantic insecurity, is rumored to have been inspired by his love for actress Susan Morss, as well as the construction of Hardin's recording studio (in the home of Lenny Bruce).

== Bobby Darin version ==
"If I Were a Carpenter"

Single by Bobby Darin

from the album If I Were a Carpenter
- B-side: "Rainin'"
- Released: September 1966
- Genre: Folk rock
- Length: 2:22
- Label: Atlantic
- Songwriter: Tim Hardin
- Producers: Charles Koppelman, Don Rubin

Bobby Darin singles chronology
"Merci Cherie" (1966)	"If I Were a Carpenter" (1966)	"The Girl Who Stood Beside Me" (1966)

The first notable version of "If I Were a Carpenter" was released by Bobby Darin in September 1966. The song was produced by Charles Koppelman and Don Rubin at Darin's insistence. Darin played the acoustic guitar on the recording. Darin took some time to record the song in his recording session, and did not finish the recording until 7 o'clock in the morning. The song was released by Atlantic Records, whose executives were reluctant to release the song until it received enthusiastic response by the radio audience on the West Coast when Koppelman managed to get the song played there.

The song became the biggest hit for Darin since his 1963 song "You're the Reason I'm Living", reaching No. 8 on the Billboard Hot 100. It also peaked at No. 9 in the UK. Darin's recording received a Grammy nomination for Best Contemporary Rock and Roll Solo Vocal Performance at the 9th Annual Grammy Awards, but lost to Paul McCartney’s vocal performance on The Beatles’ "Eleanor Rigby".

The song is the title track of Darin's album If I Were a Carpenter, also produced by Koppelman and Rubin. Darin later wrote "Simple Song of Freedom" (1969) for Hardin.

=== Charts ===
Chart (1966)	Peak position
Canada (CHUM Chart)	7
Canada Top Singles (RPM)	8
US Billboard Hot 100	8
Netherlands (Dutch Top 40)	8
Netherlands (Single Top 100)	7
New Zealand (Listener)	8
UK Singles (Official Charts)	9

== Four Tops version ==
"If I Were a Carpenter"

Single by Four Tops

from the album Reach Out
- B-side: "Wonderful Baby"
- Released: April 11, 1968
- Genre: Folk, soul
- Length: 2:47
- Label: Motown
- Songwriter: Tim Hardin
- Producers: Brian Holland, Lamont Dozier

Four Tops singles chronology
"Walk Away Renée" (1968)	"If I Were a Carpenter" (1968)	"Yesterday's Dreams" (1968)

In 1968, The Four Tops hit the Top 20 on both the pop and soul charts with their version, released as the seventh and final single from their 1967 studio album, Reach Out. It also reached No. 7 in the UK charts in 1968 staying in the charts for 11 weeks. It reached No. 4 in the Netherlands.

Cash Box said that "Excellent arrangements put a punch into the rhythmic serving, and the vocal brilliance of the quartet transforms the ballad into molten blues with monster potential."

=== Personnel ===
- Lead vocals by Levi Stubbs
- Background vocals by Duke Fakir, Obie Benson and Lawrence Payton
- Additional background vocals by The Andantes
- Instrumentation by The Funk Brothers

=== Charts ===
Chart (1968)	Peak position
Belgium (Ultratop 50 Flanders)	12
Canada Top Singles (RPM)	21
Ireland (IRMA)	6
Netherlands (Single Top 100)	4
UK Singles (Official Charts)	7
US Billboard Hot 100	20
West Germany (GfK)	34

== Johnny Cash and June Carter Cash’s duet version ==
"If I Were a Carpenter"

Single by Johnny and June Carter Cash

from the album Hello, I'm Johnny Cash
- B-side: "'Cause I Love You"
- Released: December 22, 1969
- Recorded: 1969
- Genre: Folk, country
- Length: 3:00
- Label: Columbia
- Songwriter: Tim Hardin
- Producer: Bob Johnston

Johnny Cash singles chronology
"See Ruby Fall" (1969)	"If I Were a Carpenter" (1969)	"Rock Island Line" (1970)

June Carter Cash singles chronology
"Long-Legged Guitar Pickin' Man" (1967)	"Don't Know Much" (1969)	"A Good Man" (1971)

In 1969, Johnny Cash and June Carter recorded a duet of the song which went to No. 2 on the country chart and No. 36 on pop. Later included on Cash's 1970 album, Hello, I'm Johnny Cash, it won Cash and June a Grammy Award for Best Country Performance by a Duo or Group at the 1971 Grammys.

=== Charts ===
Chart (1970)	Peak position
Canada Top Singles (RPM)	13
Canada Adult Contemporary (RPM)	11
Canada Country Singles (RPM)	1
US Adult Contemporary (Billboard)	9
US Billboard Hot 100	36
US Hot Country Songs (Billboard)	2

== Robert Plant version ==
"If I Were a Carpenter"

Single by Robert Plant

from the album Fate of Nations
- B-side: "Ship of Fools" (Live from Montreaux) "Tall Cool One" (Live from Montreaux)
- Released: 6 December 1993
- Genre: Rock
- Length: 3:45
- Label: Fontana; Es Paranza
- Songwriter: Tim Hardin
- Producers: Chris Hughes; Robert Plant

Robert Plant singles chronology
"Calling To You" (1993)	"If I Were a Carpenter" (1993)	"The Battle of Evermore" (1994)

In 1993 former Led Zeppelin vocalist Robert Plant released a version on his studio album Fate of Nations, released as the fourth and final single off that record. Plant's version reached No. 63 on the UK Singles Chart.

Personnel

- Robert Plant – lead vocals
- Kevin Scott MacMichael – guitar
- Charlie Jones – bass guitar
- Chris Hughes – drums
- Phil Johnstone – harmonium
- Maartin Allcock – mandolin
- Lynton Naiff – string arrangement

Charts

Chart (1993)	Peak position
UK Singles Chart	63

== Johnny Hallyday version (in French) ==
"Si j'étais un charpentier"

Single by Johnny Hallyday
- Language: French
- Released: December 7, 1966
- Recorded: late 1966
- Genre: Progressive rock
- Length: 2:15
- Label: Philips
- Songwriter: French adaptation: Long Chris
- Producer: Lee Hallyday

Johnny Hallyday singles chronology
"Noir c'est noir" (1966)	"Si j'étais un charpentier" (1966)	"Hey Joe" (1967)

French singer Johnny Hallyday covered the song in French in December 1966. His version, titled "Si j'étais un charpentier", reached No. 3 in Wallonia (French Belgium).

=== Track listings ===
7-inch EP Philips 437.281 BE (1966)

A1. "Si j'étais un charpentier" – 2:15
A2. "On s'est trompé" – 2:40
B1. "Je veux te graver dans ma vie" – 2:50
B2. "La fille à qui je pense" – 2:57

=== Charts ===
"Si j'étais un charpentier" / "Je veux te graver dans ma vie" / "La fille à qui je pense"

Chart (1966–1967)	Peak position
Belgium (Ultratop 50 Wallonia)	3

== Other well-known versions ==
- Bob Dylan and The Band recorded a cover of the song in the Basement Tapes in 1967.
- In 1969, Yugoslav band Crveni Koralji released a Serbo-Croatian version, entitled "Da sam drvosječa", on their EP Sam, the song becoming a nationwide hit for the band.
- In 1970, Lee Dorsey released a version on his album Yes We Can
- In 1972, a cover by Bob Seger reached No. 76 on the Billboard Hot 100. The single was released from his album Smokin' O.P.'s.
- In 1974, Leon Russell released a version with a funk tempo and his own rewritten lyrics from the perspective of a "rock star". His single reached No. 73 on the Billboard Hot 100 and was included on his album Stop All That Jazz.
- In 1982, Swanee released a version. It peaked at number 5 on the Kent Music Report and was the 33rd biggest selling single in Australia in 1981.
