= Tim Hardin =

American singer-songwriter (1941–1980)

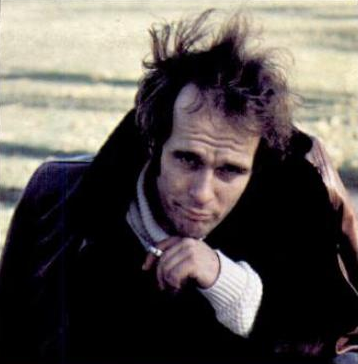
- Hardin in 1969

Background information
- Born: James Timothy Hardin; December 23, 1941; Eugene, Oregon, U.S.
- Died: December 29, 1980 (aged 39) Los Angeles, California, U.S.
- Genre: Folk
- Occupations: Singer, songwriter
- Instruments: Vocals, guitar, piano
- Years active: 1964–1980
- Labels: Verve, Columbia

James Timothy Hardin (December 23, 1941 – December 29, 1980) was an American folk music and blues singer-songwriter and guitarist. In addition to his own success, his songs "If I Were a Carpenter", "Reason to Believe", "Misty Roses" and "The Lady Came from Baltimore" were hits for other artists.

Hardin was raised in Oregon and had no interest in school, withdrawing before graduating from high school, and joining the Marines. After his discharge, he moved to Greenwich Village and Cambridge, where he played and recorded several albums. He also performed at the Newport Folk Festival and at Woodstock. He struggled with drug abuse throughout most of his adult life and his live performances were sometimes erratic. He was planning a comeback when he died in late 1980 from an accidental heroin overdose.

== Early life and career ==
Tim Hardin was born in Eugene, Oregon, to Hal and Molly Hardin, who both had musical backgrounds. His mother was a violinist and concertmaster of the Portland Symphony Orchestra and his father played bass in jazz bands in the Army and in college.

While a student at South Eugene High School, Hardin first learned to play the guitar. When he was 18, he dropped out and joined the Marines, improving his guitar skills and building a repertoire of folk songs. He first tried heroin while stationed with the Marines in Southeast Asia.

After his discharge in 1961, Hardin moved to New York City, where he briefly attended the American Academy of Dramatic Arts. He was eventually dropped for poor attendance and began to focus on his music, performing around Greenwich Village playing folk songs and blues. During this time, he became friends with fellow musicians Cass Elliot, John Sebastian and Fred Neil. He moved to Boston in 1963 and became part of a growing folk music scene there. In Boston, he was discovered by upcoming record producer Erik Jacobsen (later the producer for the Lovin' Spoonful), who arranged a meeting with Columbia Records. The next year, Hardin returned to Greenwich Village to record for Columbia and recorded several demos as an audition that the label did not release. Columbia soon terminated his contract. Verve Forecast would release these tracks six years later as Tim Hardin 4.

After moving to Los Angeles in 1965, Hardin met actress Susan Yardley Morss (known professionally as Susan Yardley) and returned to New York with her. He signed with Verve Forecast and released his first album, Tim Hardin 1, in 1966, which included "How Can We Hang On to a Dream", "Reason to Believe" and the ballad "Misty Roses" to critical acclaim and mainstream radio airplay. That same year, he played at a Saturday afternoon workshop of contemporary and protest songs at the Newport Folk Festival.

Hardin was admired for his singing voice, described by a Los Angeles Times reviewer as "a voice which quavers between the tugs of the blues and the tender side of joy. He can sing nasty, but his forte is gentle songs whose case allows him to slip and slide through a rainbow of emotions." However, Hardin said in another interview: "I think of myself more as a singer than a songwriter and always did. It happened to be that I wrote songs. I'm a jazz singer, really, writing in a different vocabulary mode but still with a jazz feel. I don't ever sing one song the same way. I'm an improvisational singer and player.”

He recorded "Black Sheep Boy" in 1966, a song about his drug use and the alienation from his family. Bobby Darin, Ronnie Hawkins, Bill Staines, Joel Grey, Scott Walker, and Don McLean recorded cover versions of the song.

In 1967, Verve released Tim Hardin 2, which contained one of Hardin's most famous songs, "If I Were a Carpenter". That same year, Atco, a subsidiary of Atlantic Records, released an album of earlier material called This Is Tim Hardin, featuring covers of "The House of the Rising Sun", Fred Neil's "Blues on the Ceiling" and Willie Dixon's "Hoochie Coochie Man" as well as the original songs "Fast Freight" and "Can't Slow Down". The album's liner notes state that Hardin recorded the songs in 1963–1964, well before the release of Tim Hardin 1.

By 1967, after critical acclaim for Hardin's first album and the release of This Is Tim Hardin, a wide variety of artists were covering his songs and he was in demand to tour Europe and the United States. However, the quality of his work was in decline partly because of "his own combativeness in the studio, his addiction to heroin, his drinking problems and his frustration with his lack of commercial success". He began performing poorly and missing shows, reportedly falling asleep on stage at London's Royal Albert Hall in 1968. At the time, he was viewed as enigmatic, with one journalist stating that while "his position as one of the best songwriters of his generation is unquestioned ... [he] ... courted the scene in the most fumbling manner imaginable". The same writer noted Hardin's "uninspired stage presence" and seemingly ambivalent relationship with his audience, as he often ignored them, just singing "at times badly, at times beautifully ... somehow always fascinating". The tour was cut short after Hardin contracted pleurisy.

In 1968, Verve released Tim Hardin 3 Live in Concert, a collection of live recordings along with remakes of earlier songs, followed by Tim Hardin 4. In September 1968, Hardin and Van Morrison shared a bill at the Cafe Au Go Go, each performing an acoustic set. In 1969, he signed with Columbia again, recording three albums for them, Suite for Susan Moore and Damion: We Are One, One, All in One, Bird on a Wire and Painted Head. He had one of his few commercial successes with a non-album single, a cover of Bobby Darin's "Simple Song of Freedom" that reached No. 50 in the U.S. as well as the Canadian charts. Because of his heroin use and stage fright, he was an unreliable live performer and he did not tour in support of the single.

In 1969, Hardin appeared at the Woodstock Festival, where he sang "If I Were a Carpenter" solo and played a set of his songs backed by a full band. None of his performances were included in the documentary film or the original soundtrack album. His performance of "If I Were a Carpenter" was included in the 1994 box set Woodstock: Three Days of Peace and Music.

== Later work and death ==
In the years that followed, Hardin traveled between Britain and the U.S. In 1969, he went to England for a program to treat heroin addiction but was unsuccessful and became addicted to the barbiturates that were administered during the withdrawal stage. His heroin addiction controlled his life by the time his last album, Nine, was released in 1973 (the album was not released in the U.S. until Antilles Records released it in 1976). He sold the rights to his songs, but accounts of how this happened differ.

In late November 1975, Hardin performed as a guest lead vocalist with the German experimental rock band Can for two UK concerts at Hatfield Polytechnic in Hertfordshire and at London's Drury Lane Theatre. According to author Rob Young in the book All Gates Open: The Story of Can, during an argument with Can after the London concert, Hardin threw a television set through a car's windshield.

After several years in Britain, Hardin returned to the U.S. in early 1980, writing ten new songs and recording them at home for a comeback. However, on December 29, his longtime friend Ron Daniels found him dead on the floor of his Hollywood apartment. The police determined that there was no evidence of foul play, and it was initially believed that Hardin had died from a heart attack. The Los Angeles coroner's office later confirmed that the cause of death was an accidental heroin overdose. Hardin was interred at Twin Oaks Cemetery in Turner, Oregon.

The following year, Columbia released his last work, eight unfinished tracks, on the posthumous album Unforgiven, along with a compilation of his previous work for the label titled The Shock of Grace.

== Covers ==
Among his successes, Tim Hardin wrote the top 40 hit "If I Were a Carpenter", covered by Bobby Darin, Bob Dylan, Bob Seger, Joan Baez, Johnny Cash, the Four Tops, Robert Plant, Small Faces, Johnny Rivers, Bert Jansch, Willie Nelson, Sheryl Crow, Smoke Fairies, Dolly Parton, Joe Nichols, The Free Design, Ernest Wilson, John Holt and others.

Many artists covered his song "Reason to Believe", such as the Carpenters, Neil Young and Rod Stewart, whose version became a No. 1 hit in the UK. "How Can We Hang On to a Dream" has been covered by Cliff Richard, Françoise Hardy, Marianne Faithfull, Fleetwood Mac, Peter Frampton, The Nice and Echo and the Bunnymen. Morrissey and Nico recorded versions of "Lenny's Tune". Bobby Darin and Johnny Cash both charted with covers of "The Lady Came from Baltimore". Astrud Gilberto sang "Misty Roses", as did Cilla Black and Colin Blunstone. Additionally, Johnny Mathis had a top 40 hit with a cover version of the song. Rick Nelson covered "Lady Came From Baltimore" on his 1969 live album, In Concert at The Troubadour,1969, as did Joan Baez on her 1967 album, Joan, and Scott Walker on his debut solo album, Scott.

== Tributes and legacy ==
In 2005, the indie rock band Okkervil River released a tribute album called Black Sheep Boy said to be based on Hardin's life. According to one reviewer, the concept of the album is a "collection that should go some way towards rekindling an interest in his life and work". Will Sheff from Okkervil River said: "There is something very disarming about how simple those songs are ..., a Tim Hardin song never outstays its welcome. It's very short and pretty: one verse, one chorus, second verse, the song is over and he's out of there. It's like a tiny, perfectly cut gem".

In January 2013, a tribute album, Reason to Believe: The Songs of Tim Hardin featuring indie and alternative rock bands from the U.K. and U.S. was released. Mark Lanegan, who sang Hardin's "Red Balloon" on the album, told Rolling Stone: "I've always been haunted by his devastating voice and beautiful songs ... I can't imagine anyone hearing him and not feeling the same". Another performer on the album, Canadian singer-songwriter Ron Sexsmith said of him that "you get what he's telling you without him spelling it out ... when it came time to make my first record, I kept that in mind". One music website initially described the album as appearing "surprisingly mainstream" but later acknowledged it in the article as a "comprehensive package ... [that] ... transcends its limitations ... [with the folkier songs] ... capturing the fragility of Hardin's original work without disrupting the moody, maudlin flow". The album was described as an opportunity to focus more on his music than his issues with drugs and his early death.

Roger Daltrey included "How Can We Hang On to a Dream" on a commemorative CD of his favorite music, which won the 2016 Music Industry Trusts Award. In the liner notes, Daltrey wrote: "I was a huge fan of Tim's".

On his third solo album, recorded in 2015, Pete Sando of the 1960s band Gandalf included a song called "Misty Roses on a Stone" that he cowrote as a dedication to Hardin after a visit to Hardin's grave. Sando acknowledged that he was greatly influenced by Hardin, noting "his lyrical economy and musical balance ... just the sheer simplicity and beauty of his songs was so appealing".

Bob Dylan reportedly said that Hardin was "the greatest living songwriter" after hearing his first album. In a 1980 interview when asked about the Dylan quote, Hardin recalled: "Yeah, I played him part of the album one night and he started flipping out, you know. Man, he got down on his knees in front of me and said: 'Don't change your singing style and don't bleep a blop...'". In the same interview, Hardin expressed some mixed feelings about Dylan, but in another article, Brian Millar concluded: "Dylan was right: for some years, Tim Hardin was the greatest songwriter alive. And just as no one sang Dylan like Dylan, no one sings Hardin like Hardin".

Hardin claimed to be either a distant relative of or direct descendant of John Wesley Hardin, the 19th century outlaw, and it has been said that this provided the inspiration for Dylan's album John Wesley Harding.

After his death, there was considerable reflection on his impact. Writers said that, along with Leonard Cohen, he was the only musician who could rival Bob Dylan in composing "deeply moving love songs" however critics also noted that he never gained the attention he deserved and by the time he died, not one of his albums was still in print. Jon Marlow writing in the Miami News said he was not about to "glorify yet another dead junkie's lifestyle" but held that the Tim Hardin Memorial album is an "unheralded but still beautiful record of 12 songs that deserve your attention and money ... and has nothing to do with dead hero worship ... it's simply here to remind us that via his first two albums Tim Hardin made a lot of promises he couldn't keep". Another reviewer wrote of the memorial album that it "firmly establishes him as an enduring and influential artist". Though his excesses came under scrutiny, one reviewer noted that "few people who have ever heard the poignant, often lonely, tone of [his] body of work would dispute the suggestion that he was one of the most affecting singer-songwriters of the modern pop era". The Los Angeles Weekly said' that his life showed that drugs, alcohol and creativity were not a long lasting or positive partnership, with the writer concluding: "I don't think Tim Hardin was ever really sure how good he was and he went from arrogance to despair, conscious of the promises he couldn't keep ... [He is] ... gone, but the songs aren't and they will last".

== Discography ==
- Tim Hardin 1 (1966)
- Tim Hardin 2 (1967)
- This Is Tim Hardin (1967)
- Tim Hardin 3 Live in Concert (1968)
- Tim Hardin 4 (1969)
- Suite for Susan Moore and Damion: We Are One, One, All in One (1969)
- Bird on a Wire (1971)
- Painted Head (1972)
- Nine (1973)
- Unforgiven (1981)
