= Michael Martin Murphey discography =

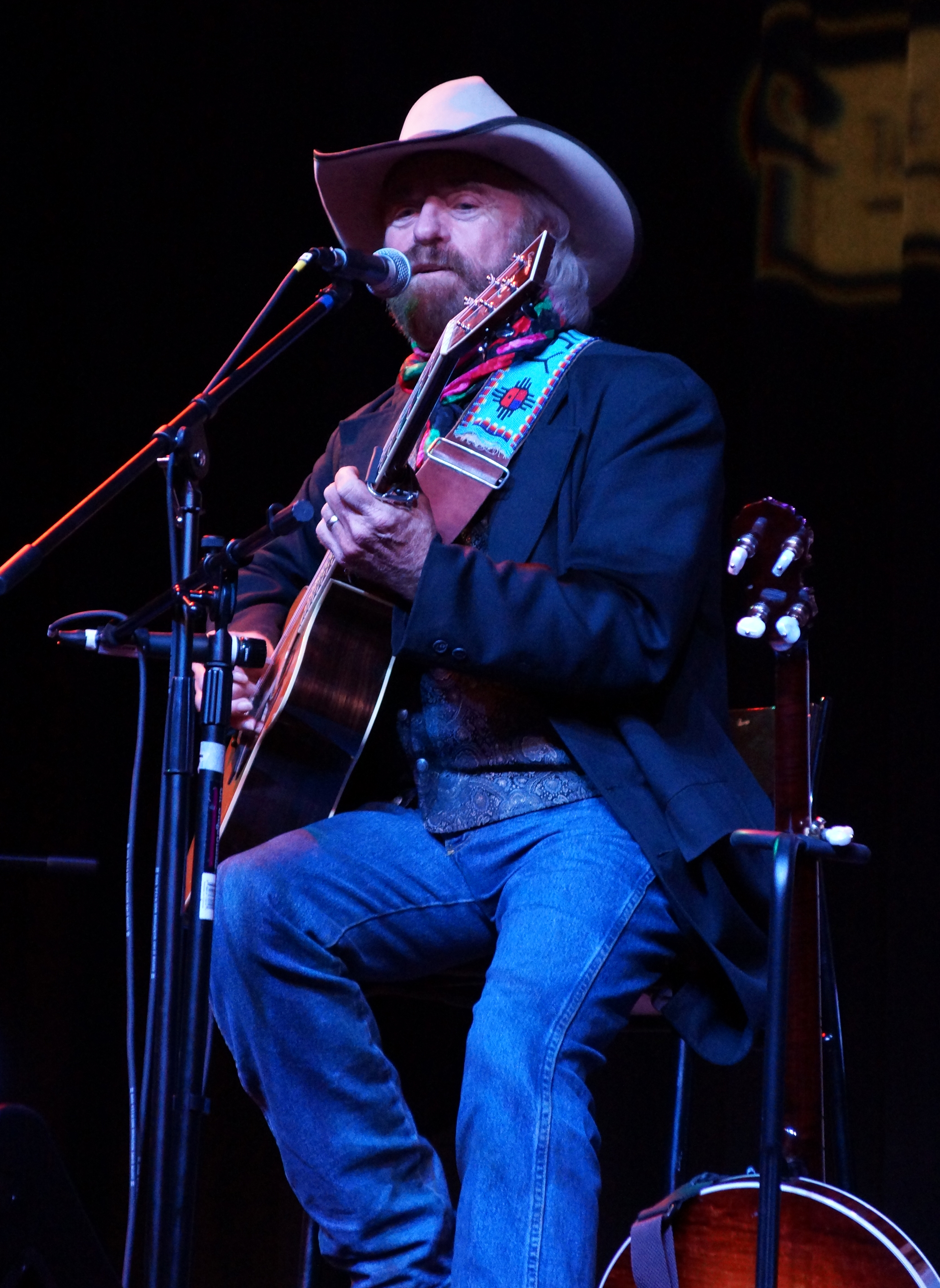
- Murphey in Plymouth, New Hampshire, 2012
- Studio albums: 34
- Compilation albums: 6
- Singles: 46
- Music videos: 13

The Michael Martin Murphey discography consists of 33 albums and 46 singles. Having first charted with "Geronimo's Cadillac" in 1972, he did not chart again until "Wildfire" three years later. Initially a pop singer, Murphey shifted to country music in 1982 with "What's Forever For", a number 1 country hit. On his earlier works he was billed as simply "Michael Murphey", adding his middle name with the 1982 album Michael Martin Murphey.

== Studio albums ==
=== 1970s ===
Title	Details	Peak chart positions			
Title	Details	US Country	US	AUS	CAN
Geronimo's Cadillac	Release date: May 25, 1972; Label: A&M Records	—	160	38	82
Cosmic Cowboy Souvenir	Release date: 1973; Label: A&M Records	—	196	—	—
Michael Murphey	Release date: April 1974; Label: Epic Records	—	—	—	—
Blue Sky – Night Thunder	Release date: 1975; Label: Epic Records	—	18	97	6
Swans Against the Sun	Release date: 1975; Label: Epic Records	47	44	—	92
Flowing Free Forever	Release date: 1976; Label: Epic Records	—	130	—	—
Lone Wolf	Release date: 1978; Label: Epic Records	—	99	—	—
Peaks, Valleys, Honky Tonks & Alleys	Release date: 1979; Label: Epic Records	—	206	—	—
"—" denotes releases that did not chart

=== 1980s ===
Title	Details	Peak chart positions	
Title	Details	US Country	US
Hard Country	Release date: 1981; Label: Epic Records	—	—
Michael Martin Murphey	Release date: 1982; Label: Liberty Records	14	69
The Heart Never Lies	Release date: 1983; Label: Liberty Records	27	187
Tonight We Ride	Release date: 1986; Label: Warner Bros. Records	46	—
Americana	Release date: 1987; Label: Warner Bros. Records	32	—
River of Time	Release date: 1988; Label: Warner Bros. Records	11	—
Land of Enchantment	Release date: 1989; Label: Warner Bros. Records	33	—
"—" denotes releases that did not chart

=== 1990s ===
Title	Details	Peak positions	Certifications (sales threshold)
Title	Details	US Country	Certifications (sales threshold)
Cowboy Songs	Release date: August 21, 1990; Label: Warner Bros. Records	25	US: Gold
Cowboy Christmas: Cowboy Songs II	Release date: September 10, 1991; Label: Warner Bros. Records	—	
Cowboy Songs III – Rhymes of the Renegades	Release date: October 12, 1993; Label: Warner Bros. Records	—	
Sagebrush Symphony	Release date: September 12, 1995; Label: Warner Bros. Records	—	
The Horse Legends	Release date: July 8, 1997; Label: Warner Bros. Records	—	
Cowboy Songs Four	Release date: July 14, 1998; Label: Valley Entertainment	—	
Acoustic Christmas Carols	Release date: August 4, 1999; Label: Valley Entertainment	—	
"—" denotes releases that did not chart

=== 2000s ===
Title	Details	Peak positions
Title	Details	US Grass
Playing Favorites	Release date: August 21, 2001; Label: Real West Production	—
Cowboy Classics: Playing Favorites II	Release date: May 14, 2002; Label: Real West Production	—
Cowboy Christmas III	Release date: 2002; Label: Wildfire Productions	—
Live at Billy Bob's Texas	Release date: March 16, 2004; Label: Smith Music Group	—
Heartland Cowboy: Cowboy Songs, Vol. 5	Release date: October 31, 2006; Label: West Fest	—
Buckaroo Blue Grass	Release date: February 10, 2009; Label: Rural Rhythm Records	6
"—" denotes releases that did not chart

=== 2010s ===
Title	Details	Peak chart positions	
Title	Details	US Country	US Grass
Lone Cowboy	Release date: January 12, 2010; Label: Western Jubilee Recording Co.	—	—
Buckaroo Blue Grass II	Release date: February 9, 2010; Label: Rural Rhythm Records	73	5
Tall Grass & Cool Water	Release date: June 28, 2011; Label: Rural Rhythm Records	—	4
Campfire on the Road	Release date: February 21, 2012; Label: Western Jubilee Recording Co.	—	—
Red River Drifter	Release date: July 9, 2013; Label: Red River Entertainment	48	2
High Stakes	Release date: April 22, 2016; Label: Murphey Kinship Recordings	—	—
Austinology - Alley of Austin	Release date: October 19, 2018; Label: Wildfire Productions	—	—
"—" denotes releases that did not chart

=== 2020s ===
Title	Details	Peak chart positions	
Title	Details	US Country	US Grass
Road Beyond the View - featuring Ryan Murphey	Release date: June 10, 2022; Label: Wildfire Productions	—	—
"—" denotes releases that did not chart

|}

== Compilation albums ==
Title	Details	Peak positions
Title	Details	US Country
The Best of Michael Martin Murphey	Release date: 1984; Label: Liberty Records	20
The Best of Country	Release date: 1990; Label: Curb Records	—
What's Forever For	Release date: 1992; Label: CEMA Records	—
Wildfire 1972–1984	Release date: 1998; Label: Raven Records	—
Ultimate Collection	Release date: 2001; Label: Hip-O Records	—
Cowboy Christmas Gift Set	Release date: 2006; Label: Wildfire Productions	—
"—" denotes releases that did not chart

== Singles ==
=== 1970s ===
Year	Title	Peak chart positions							Album
Year	Title	US	US AC	US Country	AUS	CAN	CAN AC	CAN Country	Album
1972	"Geronimo's Cadillac"	37	—	—	96	—	—	—	Geronimo's Cadillac
1973	"Calico Silver"	—	—	—	—	—	—	—	Geronimo's Cadillac
1973	"Cosmic Cowboy"	—	—	—	—	—	—	—	Cosmic Cowboy Souvenir
1974	"Holy Roller"	—	—	—	—	—	—	—	Michael Murphey
1974	"You Can Only Say So Much"	—	—	—	—	—	—	—	Michael Murphey
1975	"Wildfire"	3	1	—	22	1	1	—	Blue Sky – Night Thunder
1975	"Carolina in the Pines"	21	4	—	—	25	4	—	Blue Sky – Night Thunder
1976	"Renegade"	39	—	—	—	48	—	—	Swans Against the Sun
1976	"A Mansion on the Hill"	—	—	36	—	—	—	20	Swans Against the Sun
1976	"Rhythm of the Road"	—	—	—	—	—	—	—	Swans Against the Sun
1977	"Cherokee Fiddle"	—	—	58	—	—	—	—	Flowing Free Forever
1977	"Changing Woman"	—	—	—	—	—	—	—	Flowing Free Forever
1978	"Nothing Is Your Own"	—	—	—	—	—	—	—	Lone Wolf
1978	"Paradise Tonight"	—	—	—	—	—	—	—	Lone Wolf
1979	"Chain Gang"	—	—	93	—	—	—	—	Peaks, Valleys, Honky Tonks & Alleys
1979	"Backslider's Wine"	—	—	92	—	—	—	—	Peaks, Valleys, Honky Tonks & Alleys
"—" denotes releases that did not chart

=== 1980s and 1990s ===
Year	Title	Peak chart positions						Album
Year	Title	US	US AC	US Country	AUS	CAN AC	CAN Country	Album
1981	"Take It as It Comes" (with Katy Moffatt)	—	—	83	—	—	—	Hard Country (soundtrack)
1982	"The Two-Step Is Easy"	—	—	44	—	—	—	Michael Martin Murphey
1982	"What's Forever For"	19	4	1	36	7	1	Michael Martin Murphey
1982	"Still Taking Chances"	76	28	3	—	9	17	Michael Martin Murphey
1983	"Love Affairs"	—	—	11	—	—	18	Michael Martin Murphey
1983	"Don't Count the Rainy Days"	— (Note: "Don't Count the Rainy Days" did not enter the Hot 100, but peaked at number six on Bubbling Under Hot 100 Singles.)	16	9	92	—	22	The Heart Never Lies
1983	"Maybe This Time"	—	—	—	—	—	—	The Heart Never Lies
1984	"Will It Be Love by Morning"	—	—	7	—	—	5	The Heart Never Lies
1984	"Disenchanted"	—	12	12	—	22	11	The Heart Never Lies
1984	"Radio Land"	—	—	19	—	—	30	The Heart Never Lies
1984	"What She Wants"	—	39	8	—	—	6	The Best of Michael Martin Murphey
1985	"Carolina in the Pines" (re-recording)	—	—	9	—	—	11	The Best of Michael Martin Murphey
1986	"Tonight We Ride"	—	—	26	—	—	28	Tonight We Ride
1986	"Rollin' Nowhere"	—	—	15	—	—	14	Tonight We Ride
1986	"Fiddlin' Man"	—	—	40	—	—	—	Tonight We Ride
1987	"A Face in the Crowd" (with Holly Dunn)	—	—	4	—	—	7	Americana
1987	"A Long Line of Love"	—	—	1	—	—	1	Americana
1987	"I'm Gonna Miss You, Girl"	—	—	3	—	—	4	River of Time
1988	"Talkin' to the Wrong Man" (with Ryan Murphey)	—	—	4	—	—	1	River of Time
1988	"Pilgrims on the Way (Matthew's Song)"	—	—	29	—	—	—	River of Time
1988	"From the Word Go"	—	—	3	—	—	2	River of Time
1989	"Never Givin' Up on Love"	—	—	9	—	—	21	Land of Enchantment
1989	"Family Tree"	—	—	48	—	—	81	Land of Enchantment
1989	"Route 66"	—	—	67	—	—	44	Land of Enchantment
1990	"Cowboy Logic"	—	—	52	—	—	71	Cowboy Songs
1991	"Let the Cowboy Dance"	—	—	74	—	—	71	Cowboy Songs
1991	"What Am I Doing Here"	—	—	—	—	—	—	Cowboy Songs
1992	"I Don't Do Floors"	—	—	—	—	—	—	Non-album singles
1993	"Dancing with a Memory"	—	—	—	—	—	—	Non-album singles
1993	"Big Iron" (with Marty Robbins)	—	—	—	—	—	62	Cowboy Songs III
1998	"Born to Buck Bad Luck"	—	—	—	—	—	—	Cowboy Songs Four
"—" denotes releases that did not chart

== Music videos ==
Year	Video	Director
1983	"Disenchanted"	
1985	"What She Wants"	David Hogan
1987	"Long Line of Love"	Michael Merriman
1987	"I'm Gonna Miss You Girl"	
1989	"Never Giving Up on Love"	
1990	"Route 66"	
1990	"Cowboy Logic"	Michael Martin Murphey
1991	"Red River Valley"	Michael Merriman
1991	"Cowboy Christmas Ball" (with Suzy Bogguss)	
1992	"Dancing with a Memory"	Michael Martin Murphey
1993	"Big Iron"	Michael Merriman
1993	"The Wild West Is Gonna Get Wilder"	
1998	"Born to Buck Bad Luck"	Adrienne Thiele
