= Playing Favorites (Michael Martin Murphey album) =

Studio album by Michael Martin Murphey
- Released: August 21, 2001
- Studio: Omni Sound, Nashville, Tennessee
- Genre: Country, cowboy music
- Length: 48:10
- Label: Real West Production
- Producer: Joey Miskulin

Michael Martin Murphey chronology
Acoustic Christmas Carols (1999)	Playing Favorites (2001)	Cowboy Classics: Playing Favorites II (2002)

Playing Favorites is the twenty-third album by American singer-songwriter Michael Martin Murphey. Released August 21, 2001, the album features completely new recordings of eleven of the artist's country, cowboy, and popular crossover classics, as well as one new song. In his liner notes, Murphey writes that "songs are like children; they grow, evolve, change with time." The concept behind Playing Favorites was to document the growth and evolution of his best-loved tunes, using many new musicians and modern recording techniques not available when the original recordings were done.

== Critical reception ==
Professional ratings
Review scores
Source	Rating
AllMusic	4.5/5 stars

In his review on the Allmusic web site, Jonathan Widran gave the album four and a half out of five stars, praising the music's "warmth and familiarity" and the way the new recordings capture "the romance and adventurous Western spirit" of Murphey's career.

Listening to the songs on this disc is the musical equivalent of inviting a handful of old and dear friends over to dinner. They're a bit older and wiser since they were last seen, and the details of the stories they share have changed slightly with age, but their warmth and familiarity win listeners over instantly. More than simply an exciting greatest-hits project from one of contemporary music's most beloved and enduring artists, the collection features completely new recordings of 11 country, cowboy, and pop crossover classics that perfectly capture the romance and adventurous Western spirit of the singer/songwriter's 30-year recording career, including his best loved hits.

== Track listing ==
1. "Carolina in the Pines" (Murphey) – 4:35
2. "Adobe Walls" (Brown, Reed) – 3:43
3. "Cherokee Fiddle" (Murphey) – 4:08
4. "A Long Line of Love" (Overstreet, Schuyler) – 3:25
5. "All The Dancing Horses" (Murphey, Murphey) – 4:21
6. "Fiddlin' Man" (Murphey, Norman, Rains) – 3:57
7. "Cowboy Logic" (Cook, Rains) – 3:40
8. "I'm Gonna Miss You Girl" (Winchester) – 4:09
9. "From The Word Go" (Garvin, Waters) – 3:14
10. "Geronimo's Cadillac" (Murphey, Quarto) – 5:05
11. "What's Forever For" (Van Hoy) – 2:54
12. "Wildfire" (Murphey, Cansler) – 4:59

== Credits ==
Music

- Michael Martin Murphey – vocals, guitar, producer, liner notes
- Pat Flynn – guitar
- Chris Leuzinger – guitar
- Sonny Garrish – steel guitar
- Richard Bailey – banjo
- Sam Bush – mandolin
- Jonathan Yudkin – fiddle
- Joey Miskulin – accordion, producer
- David Hoffner – piano, synthesizer
- Craig Nelson – bass
- Bob Mater – drums, percussion
- Ryan Murphey – background vocals

Production

- Gary Paczosa – engineer
- Denny Purcell – mastering
- Keith Compton – mixing
- Eric Conn – editing
