= Buckaroo Blue Grass =

Studio album by Michael Martin Murphey
- Released: February 10, 2009
- Recorded: Omnisound Studios, Michael Card Studio, Nashville, Tennessee (Note: "Close to the Land" was recorded at Sound Strations Audio Productions in La Crosse, Wisconsin.)
- Genre: Country, bluegrass
- Label: Rural Rhythm Records
- Producer: Ryan Murphey

Michael Martin Murphey chronology
Heartland Cowboy: Cowboy Songs, Vol. 5 (2006)	Buckaroo Blue Grass (2009)	Lone Cowboy (2010)

Buckaroo Blue Grass is the twenty-eighth studio album by the American singer-songwriter Michael Martin Murphey, and his first album of bluegrass music.

== Track listing ==
1. "Lone Cowboy" (Murphey) – 3:12
2. "What Am I Doing Hangin' Round?" (Murphey) – 3:09
3. "Lost River" (Murphey) – 3:17
4. "Carolina in the Pines" (Murphey) – 4:36
5. "Cherokee Fiddle" (Murphey) – 4:21
6. "Dancing in the Meadow" (Murphey) – 3:45
7. "Healing Spring" (Murphey) – 4:57
8. "Fiddlin' Man" (Murphey, Norman, Rains) – 4:25
9. "Boy from the Country" (Murphey) – 4:23
10. "Wild Bird" (Murphey) – 2:56
11. "Close to the Land (America's Heartland)" (Murphey, Quist) – 4:26

== Credits ==
Music

- Michael Martin Murphey – vocals, acoustic guitar, executive producer
- Ryan Murphey – acoustic guitar, vocals, producer
- Rhonda Vincent – vocals
- Pat Flynn – guitar
- Rob Ickes – dobro
- Charlie Cushman – banjo
- Mike Stidolph – mandolin
- Ronnie McCoury – mandolin
- Clay Riness – mandolin
- Sam Bush – mandolin, fiddle
- Andy Leftwich – fiddle
- David Davidson – fiddle
- Matthew Wilkes – bass guitar
- Craig Nelson – bass guitar

Production

- Keith Compton – engineer
- Don Edwards – liner notes

== Chart performance ==
Chart (2009)	Peak position
U.S. Billboard Top Bluegrass Albums	6
