= Rio Grande Band =

The Rio Grande Band
- Genres: Country, Western music
- Years active: 1985–present
- Members: Gary Roller – bass and vocals Ryan Murphey – lead guitar and vocals Pat Flynn – guitar and vocals David Coe – fiddle and mandolin Troy Ingle – fiddle and mandolin Bobby Blazier – drums
- Website: www.michaelmartinmurphey.com

The Rio Grande Band is the touring band for American singer-songwriter Michael Martin Murphey. Gary Roller is the longest-standing member of the band, having joined Murphey in his live performances in 1985. David Coe joined the band in 1990, and in the late 1990s, Ryan Murphey began recording with his father and touring with the band. In recent years, Bobby Blazier and Troy Ingle were added to the lineup.

Guitarist Pat Flynn began recording with Murphey in 1993 on Cowboy Songs III, and began performing with the Rio Grande Band during the past decade. Flynn was inducted into the Frets "Gallery of Greats" alongside Chet Atkins, Doc Watson and Tony Rice. One of the great session guitarists in Country music, Flynn has appeared on over 400 albums, including 32 Gold and Platinum records. He has played on several CMA and Grammy award winning projects with a wide array of top artists.
