= High Stakes =

High Stakes may refer to:

== Film and television ==
- High Stakes (1918 film), an American film directed by Arthur Hoyt
- High Stakes (1931 film), an early talkie and the last film for silent actress Mae Murray
- High Stakes (1989 film), a thriller, debut film of Sarah Michelle Gellar
- High Stakes (1997 film), a TV movie starring Cynthia Gibb
- Sharpay's Fabulous Adventure (working title: High Stakes), a 2011 Disney film starring Ashley Tisdale
- High Stakes (game show), a 2011 British television game show
- High Stakes (TV series), a 2001 British television sitcom
- RevPro High Stakes, a series of professional wrestling events by Revolution Pro Wrestling

== Literature ==
- High Stakes (Nancy Drew/Hardy Boys), a 1996 young-adult mystery novel
- High Stakes (Cabot novel) or Ninth Key, a 2004 Mediator novel by Meg Cabot
- High Stakes, a 1975 novel by Dick Francis

== Music ==
- High Stakes (album), or the title song, by Michael Martin Murphey, 2016
- "High Stakes", a song by Bryson Tiller from True to Self
- "High Stakes", a song by Mob Figaz from C-Bo's Mob Figaz

== Sports and games ==
- High Stakes (video game), a 1986 PC booter game based on the Dick Francis novel
- Need for Speed: High Stakes, a 1999 racing video game
- PFC 12: High Stakes, a 2009 Palace Fighting Championship mixed martial arts event
