= Buckaroo Blue Grass II =

Studio album by Michael Martin Murphey
- Released: February 9, 2010
- Recorded: Omnisound Studios, Michael Card Studio, Nashville, Tennessee
- Genre: Country, bluegrass
- Length: 51:27
- Label: Rural Rhythm Records
- Producer: Ryan Murphey

Michael Martin Murphey chronology
Lone Cowboy (2010)	Buckaroo Blue Grass II (2010)	Tall Grass & Cool Water (2011)

Buckaroo Blue Grass II – Riding Song is the twenty-ninth album by American singer-songwriter Michael Martin Murphey, and his second album of bluegrass music.

== Track listing ==
All tracks are written by Michael Martin Murphey, except where indicated.

No.	Title	Writer(s)	Length
1.	"Blue Sky Riding Song"		4:42
2.	"Running Gun"	Jim Glaser; Tompall Glaser	2:44
3.	"Backslider’s Wine"		2:59
4.	"Rollin’ Nowhere"		3:26
5.	"Southwestern Pilgrimage"		4:28
6.	"Medicine Man"	Michael Martin Murphey; Jac Murphey	3:54
7.	"Cosmic Cowboy"		4:28
8.	"Desert Rat"		3:41
9.	"Running Blood"	Michael Martin Murphey; David Hoffner	3:49
10.	"Wildfire"	Michael Martin Murphey; Larry Cansler	5:53
11.	"Renegade"		7:34
12.	"Swans Against the Sun"		3:49
Total length:			51.27

== Credits ==
Music

- Michael Martin Murphey – vocals, acoustic guitar, executive producer
- Ryan Murphey – acoustic guitar, producer
- Pat Flynn – lead acoustic guitar
- Audie Blaylock – lead acoustic guitar
- Andy Hall – dobro
- Rob Ickes – dobro
- Charlie Cushman – banjo
- Ronnie McCoury – mandolin
- Sam Bush – mandolin
- Troy Engle – mandolin, fiddle
- Andy Leftwich – mandolin, fiddle
- Craig Nelson – acoustic bass
- Matt Pierson – bass

Production

- Keith Compton – engineer, mastering
- Benny Quinn – mastering
- Stoker White – assistant

== Chart performance ==
Chart (2010)	Peak position
U.S. Billboard Top Bluegrass Albums	5
U.S. Billboard Top Country Albums	73
