= Heartland Cowboy: Cowboy Songs, Vol. 5 =

Heartland Cowboy

Studio album by Michael Martin Murphey
- Released: October 31, 2006
- Recorded: Blazing Saddles Studios, Nashville, Tennessee
- Genre: Country, cowboy music
- Length: 45:15
- Label: Michael Martin Murphey
- Producer: Bobby Blazier; Jeremy Hunter; Ryan Murphey

Michael Martin Murphey chronology
Live at Billy Bob's Texas (2004)	Heartland Cowboy (2006)	Buckaroo Blue Grass (2009)

Heartland Cowboy: Cowboy Songs, Vol. 5 is the twenty-seventh album by American singer-songwriter Michael Martin Murphey, his fifth album of cowboy songs. The album includes the hit song "Long and Lonesome Ride to Dalhart", which won the 2006 Wrangler Award for Outstanding Original Western Composition. The album was inspired by Murphey's life on his ranch and his real experiences working as an activist and artist in American Ranching and Farming.

== Track listing ==
1. "Free Rein (Jessica's Song)" (Murphey) – 3:22
2. "Close to the Land" (Murphey, Quist) – 4:33
3. "Wheel Comes Around (Morgan's Song)" (Murphey, Riness) – 4:36
4. "Dry Lightning" (Springsteen) – 5:17
5. "Out of Line (Karen's Song)" (Murphey) – 4:43
6. "Long and Lonesome Ride to Dalhart" (Murphey) – 3:57
7. "Storm Over the Rangeland (The Ballad of Kit Laney)" (Murphey) – 4:15
8. "Ride out the Storm" (Murphey) – 5:17
9. "Bluebonnets" (Murphey) – 4:09
10. "My Country Under God (Sarah's Song)" (Murphey) – 3:39
11. "America's Heartland" (Reprise) / "Simple Gifts" – 1:27

== Personnel ==
- Michael Martin Murphey – vocals, acoustic guitar, banjo
- Pat Flynn – mando-guitar, 12-string acoustic guitar
- Ryan Murphey – slide guitar, acoustic guitar
- Chris Leuzinger – electric guitar
- Tim Laure – keyboards, Hammond organ, piano
- Jim Hoke – accordion
- David Davidson – fiddle
- Larry Franklin – fiddle
- Laura Wood – violin
- Ian Davidson – English horn
- Bobby Blazier – drums, percussion
- Ron Hemby – background vocals
- Sonya Isaacs – background vocals
- Kristen Wilkenson – orchestral arrangements
