= Live at Billy Bob's Texas =

Live at Billy Bob's Texas may refer to:

- Live at Billy Bob's Texas (Lynn Anderson album), 2000
- Live at Billy Bob's Texas (Janie Fricke album), 2002
- Live at Billy Bob's Texas (Stoney LaRue album)
- Live at Billy Bob's Texas (Michael Martin Murphey album)
- Live at Billy Bob's Texas (Willie Nelson album), 2004
- Live at Billy Bob's Texas (Randy Rogers Band album)
- Live at Billy Bob's Texas (Tanya Tucker album)

== See also ==
- Billy Bob's, a nightclub in Texas where these albums were recorded
