= Hard Country =

Hard Country may refer to:

- Hard Country (film), a 1981 film starring Jan-Michael Vincent and Kim Basinger
- Hard Country (album), a 1981 album by Michael Martin Murphey, the soundtrack to the film
