= Cowboy Christmas III =

Studio album by Michael Martin Murphey
- Released: 2002
- Recorded: Reggie's Attic, Upfront Studios, Nashville, Tennessee (Note: The poetry was recorded at Actual Sound, La Crosse, Wisconsin, and Taos Recording Studios, Taos, New Mexico.)
- Genre: Cowboy poetry, cowboy music
- Label: Wildfire Productions
- Producer: Reggie Smith; Michael Martin Murphey

Michael Martin Murphey chronology
Cowboy Classics: Playing Favorites II (2002)	Cowboy Christmas III (2002)	Live at Billy Bob's Texas (2004)

Cowboy Christmas III is the twenty-fifth album by American singer-songwriter Michael Martin Murphey and his third album of Christmas music. The album features traditional music and poetry performed by Michael Martin Murphy and cowgirl poet, Sarah Rische. Also included is a new Michael Martin Murphey song "The Kill Pen". All the poems were recited by Michael Martin Murphey except "Are You Going Home for Christmas", which was recited by Sarah Rische.

== Track list ==
1. "Are You Going Home for Christmas?" (Edgar Guest) – 2:17
2. "The Old Times Christmas" (Bruce Kiskaddon) – 2:47
3. "Draggin' in the Christmas Tree" (Doc Mayer) – 4:27
4. "The Kill Pen" (Michael Martin Murphey, Karen Murphey) – 3:49
5. "Doc's Morning Star Ranch Christmas Trilogy" (Doc Mayer) – 3:44
6. "The Cowboy's Christmas Prayer" (S. Omar Barker) – 3:34
7. "The Night Before Cowboy Christmas" (Michael Martin Murphey) – 3:24
8. "Riding the River Styx" (Doc Mayer) – 10:37

== Credits ==
Music

- Michael Martin Murphey – vocals
- Sarah Rische – vocals
- Ryan Murphey – guitar
- John McEuen – guitar
- Bea McTye – pipe organ
- Joey Miskulin – accordion
- Paul Sadler – backing tracks

Production

- Reggie Smith – producer
- Michael Martin Murphey – producer
- Alana Richstone – graphic design
- Jerry Riness – cover painting and back photo
