= Cowboy Songs (Michael Martin Murphey album) =

Studio album by Michael Martin Murphey
- Released: August 21, 1990
- Recorded: Omni Sound Studio, Nashville, Tennessee
- Genre: Country, western
- Length: 65:43
- Label: Warner Bros. Records
- Producer: Steve Gibson

Michael Martin Murphey chronology
Land of Enchantment (1989)	Cowboy Songs (1990)	Cowboy Christmas: Cowboy Songs II (1991)

Professional ratings
Review scores
Source	Rating
Allmusic	4.5/5 stars

Cowboy Songs is the sixteenth album by American singer-songwriter Michael Martin Murphey. The album peaked at number 25 on the Billboard Top Country Albums chart.

== Track listings ==
1. "Cowboy Logic" (Don Cook, Chick Rains) – 3:35
2. "I Ride an Old Paint" / "Whoopee Ti-Yi-Yo, Git Along Little Doggies" (Traditional) – 3:01
3. "Tumbling Tumbleweeds" (Nolan) – 2:20
4. "Tying Knots in the Devil's Tail" – 3:06
5. "The Old Chisholm Trail" – 4:46
6. "Home on the Range" – 3:31
7. "What Am I Doing Here" (Michael Martin Murphey, Cook, Raines) – 3:02
8. "Wild Ripplin' Waters" – 1:47
9. "The Yellow Rose of Texas" (Traditional) – 3:00
10. "Spanish is the Loving Tongue" (Clark, Simon) – 5:40
11. "Cowboy Pride" (Tyson) – 2:51
12. "Red River Valley" – 3:30
13. "Let the Cowboy Dance" (Murphey, Cook, Raines) – 3:01
14. "Jack of Diamonds" – 1:13
15. "Texas Rangers" – 3:21
16. "When the Work's All Done This Fall" (Traditional) – 3:18
17. "The Streets of Laredo" (Murphey, PD) – 4:06
18. "O Bury Me Not on the Lone Prairie" – 3:02
19. "Where Do Cowboys Go When They Die" / "Reincarnation" – 3:42
20. "Goodbye Old Paint" – 2:13
21. "Happy Trails" (Evans) – 2:16

== Credits ==
Music

- Michael Martin Murphey – vocals, guitar, producer, arranger
- Tammy Wynette – background vocals
- Steve Gibson – electric guitar, mandolin, background vocals, producer
- Biff Watson – guitar
- Mark Casstevens – guitar, harmonica
- Paul Franklin – steel guitar
- Sonny Garrish – steel guitar
- John McEuen – banjo, mandolin, fiddle
- Dennis Burnside – keyboards
- David Hoffner – keyboards, hammer dulcimer
- Mark O'Connor – fiddle
- Terry McMillan – harmonica
- Michael Rhodes – bass
- Craig Nelson – electric bass
- Eddie Bayers – drums
- Jerry Kroon – drums
- Don Edwards – background vocals
- Jack Hannah – background vocals
- Curtis Stone – background vocals
- Cactus Moser – background vocals
- Jack Daniels – background vocals
- Suzy Bogguss – background vocals
- Paulette Carlson – background vocals
- Red Steagall – background vocals
- Lon Hannah – background vocals
- Dennis Wilson – background vocals
- Curtis Young – background vocals

Production

- Steve Gibson – producer
- Rich Schirmer – recording, mixing,
- Carry Summers – assistant
- Steve Bishir – assistant
- Denny Purcell – mastering
- William Matthews – art direction, watercolor painting
- Steve Whatley – design

== Charts ==
=== Weekly charts ===
Chart (1990)	Peak position
US Top Country Albums (Billboard)	25

=== Year-end charts ===
Chart (1991)	Position
US Top Country Albums (Billboard)	53

== Certifications ==
Region	Certification	Certified units/sales
United States (RIAA)	Gold	500,000^{^}
^{^} Shipments figures based on certification alone.
