= Cowboy Christmas: Cowboy Songs II =

Studio album by Michael Martin Murphey
- Released: September 10, 1991
- Recorded: Omni Sound Studio, Nashville, Tennessee
- Genre: Country, cowboy music, Christmas music
- Length: 45:45
- Label: Warner Bros. Records
- Producer: Michael Martin Murphey

Michael Martin Murphey chronology
Cowboy Songs (1990)	Cowboy Christmas: Cowboy Songs II (1991)	Cowboy Songs III (1993)

Professional ratings
Review scores
Source	Rating
Allmusic	2.5/5 stars

Cowboy Christmas: Cowboy Songs II is the seventeenth album by American singer-songwriter Michael Martin Murphey and his first album of Christmas music.

== Track listing ==
1. "I Heard The Bells On Christmas" / "Old Time Christmas" (Caskin, Kiskaddon, Longfellow) – 2:24
2. "Jolly Old St. Nicholas" / "The Christmas Letter" (Mitchell) – 2:39
3. "The Creak of the Leather" (Kiskaddon) – 0:26
4. "Christmas on the Line (The Line Rider's Christmas)" (Murphey, Raines) – 3:08
5. "Sleigh Ride" / "Jingle Bells" (Anderson, Parish, Pierpont) – 2:39
6. "The Christmas Trail" (Clark, Edwards) – 3:13
7. "Merry Texas Christmas You All" (Harris, Miller) – 2:11
8. "Ridin' Home On Christmas Eve" (Green) – 2:46
9. "Corn, Water and Wood" (Elliott, Waldman) – 3:10
10. "The Cowboy Christmas Ball" (Chittenden) – 3:35
11. Polka Medley: "Good King Wenceslas" / "Under The Double Eagle" / "Redwing" / "Golden Slippers" – 1:48
12. "Christmas Cowboy Style" (Murphey, Quist) – 3:11
13. "Santa Claus Shottische" – 1:23
14. "Two-Step `Round The Christmas Tree" (Bogguss, Crider) – 2:33
15. Two Step Medley: "Cotton-Eyed Joe" / "Deck the Halls" / "Buffalo Gals" / "Soldier's Joy" / "The Girl I Left Behind" / "Deck the Halls" – 1:58
16. "Log Cabin Home in the Sky" (Heron) – 2:39
17. Waltz Medley: "O Christmas Tree (O Tannenbaum)" / "Put Your Little Foot (The Varsouvianna)" / "The Westfalia Waltz" / "Over the Waves (The Skaters' Waltz)" / "O Christmas Tree" – 2:30
18. "Pearls in the Snow" (Murphey, Quist, Dunn) – 3:08
19. "Good Night Ladies" / "Auld Lang Syne" – 1:17

== Credits ==
Music

- Michael Martin Murphey – vocals, arranger, producer, liner notes
- Debra Black – arranger, conductor
- Waddie Mitchell – speaking parts
- Suzy Bogguss – vocals (Two-Step 'Round The Christmas Tree)
- Riders in the Sky – vocals
- Don Edwards – arranger
- Steve Gibson – electric guitar, acoustic guitar, gut string guitar, mandolin, background vocals, producer, arranger
- Randy Scruggs – acoustic guitar
- Bruce Bouton – pedal steel
- Sonny Garrish – pedal steel
- David Schnaufer – hammer dulcimer
- Alisa Jones – hammer dulcimer
- Sam Bush – fiddle, mandolin, mandola
- Carl Jackson – banjo
- Vince Farsetta – claw hammer banjo
- Dennis Burnside – piano
- Phil Naish – synthesizer
- Joey Miskulin – accordion, arranger
- David Hungate – electric bass
- Craig Hungate – acoustic bass
- Craig Nelson – acoustic bass
- Lonnie Wilson – percussion, drums
- The Kid Connection – background vocals
- Emily Estes – background vocals
- Lori Casteel – background vocals
- Dionne McGuire – background vocals
- Gary Janney – background vocals
- Carrie Gardner – background vocals
- Bethany Wright – background vocals
- Tommy Gardner – background vocals
- Curtis Young – background vocals
- Rachel Howell – background vocals
- Dennis Wilson – background vocals

Production

- Carol Elliott – production coordination
- Eric Prestidge – engineer
- Keith Compton – engineer
- Patrick Kelly – assistant engineer
- Marshall Morgan – mixing
- Denny Purcell – mastering
- Steven Whatley – cover design, design
- William Matthews – watercolor artwork
