= Red River Drifter =

Studio album by Michael Martin Murphey
- Released: July 9, 2013
- Recorded: 2013
- Genres: Country, bluegrass, cowboy
- Length: 34:07
- Label: Red River Entertainment
- Producers: Ryan Murphey; Pat Flynn

Michael Martin Murphey chronology
Campfire on the Road (2012)	Red River Drifter (2013)	High Stakes (2016)

Red River Drifter is the thirty-third album by American singer-songwriter Michael Martin Murphey.

== Recording ==
Red River Drifter was recorded in 2013 at Bumpin' Heads Studio and Omnisound Studio in Nashville, Tennessee, and Mole End Studio in Franklin, Tennessee.

== Critical reception ==
In his review in Country Standard Time, Robert Wooldridge observed that "the western feel is still prominent, but Murphey also reveals bluegrass, country, pop and jazz influences on a collection of new compositions."

== Track listing ==
All songs were written by Michael Martin Murphey, Ryan Murphey, and Pat Flynn, except where noted.

1. "Peaceful Country" – 2:42
2. "Rolling Sky" – 3:27
3. "Secret Smile" – 3:06
4. "Faded Blue" – 3:45
5. "Shake It Off" – 3:53
6. "Hardscrabble Creek" – 4:12
7. "Mountain Storm" (Michael Martin Murphey and Ryan Murphey) – 3:33
8. "The Gathering" – 3:37
9. "New Old Love" – 2:44
10. "Unfinished Symphony" – 3:25

== Credits ==
Music

- Michael Martin Murphey – vocals, acoustic guitar, banjo
- Ryan Murphey – acoustic guitar, mandolin, background vocals
- Pat Flynn – lead acoustic guitar, background vocals
- Jason Mowry – fiddle
- Troy Engle – fiddle, banjo
- Matt Pierson – bass
- Bobby Blazier – drums, percussion
- Pauline Resse – duet vocals (5), background vocals

Production

- Ryan Murphey – producer
- Pat Flynn – producer
- Michael Martin Murphey – executive producer, self-portrait
- Keith Compton – engineer
- Glenn Sweitzer – photography, album design

== Chart performance ==
Chart (2013)	Peak position
US Top Bluegrass Albums (Billboard)	2
US Top Country Albums (Billboard)	48
