= Sounds Like Love =

Single by Johnny Lee

from the album Sounds Like Love
- B-side: "The Deeper We Fall"
- Released: January 24, 1983
- Genre: Country
- Length: 2:52
- Label: Asylum
- Songwriter(s): Tommy Rocco, Charlie Black
- Producer(s): Jim Ed Norman

Johnny Lee singles chronology
"Cherokee Fiddle" (1982)	"Sounds Like Love" (1983)	"Hey Bartender" (1983)

"Sounds Like Love" is a song written by Tommy Rocco and Charlie Black, and recorded by American country music artist Johnny Lee. It was released in January 1983 as the second single and title track from the album Sounds Like Love. The song reached number 6 on the Billboard Hot Country Singles & Tracks chart.

== Chart performance ==
Chart (1983)	Peak position
US Hot Country Songs (Billboard)	6
Canadian RPM Country Tracks	9
