= Flowing Free Forever =

Studio album by Michael Martin Murphey
- Released: 1976
- Genre: Country, cowboy music
- Length: 41:37
- Label: Epic
- Producer: Jeff Guercio

Michael Martin Murphey chronology
Swans Against the Sun (1975)	Flowing Free Forever (1976)	Lone Wolf (1978)

Professional ratings
Review scores
Source	Rating
Allmusic	3.5/5 stars

Flowing Free Forever is the sixth album by American singer-songwriter Michael Martin Murphey. The album establishes Murphey's love of wide open spaces and his "desire to let his soul roam freely." The album was not as commercially successful as a few of his earlier releases, but "Murphey's visions and persona remain intact." The album contains the song "Cherokee Fiddle", which was later recorded by Johnny Lee for the film soundtrack for Urban Cowboy. Flowing Free Forever peaked at number 130 on the Billboard 200.

== Track listing ==
1. "Flowing Free Forever" (Murphey, Murphey) – 4:15
2. "North Wind and a New Moon" (Murphey, Murphey) – 3:55
3. "Cherokee Fiddle" (Murphey) – 3:34
4. "See How All the Horses Come Dancing" (Murphey) – 4:36
5. "Yellow House" (Broussard) – 5:15
6. "Changing Woman" (Murphey, McKinney) – 4:05
7. "High Country Caravan" (Fromholtz) – 4:38
8. "Running Wide Open" (Murphey) – 3:26
9. "Our Lady of Sante Fe" (Murphey, Weisberg) – 2:28
10. "Wandering Minstrel" (Murphey) – 5:25

== Credits ==
Music

- Michael Martin Murphey – vocals, guitar, piano, harmonica, percussion, producer
- Sam Broussard – guitar, background vocals
- John McEuen – banjo, guitar, mandolin, fiddle
- Peter Maunu – electric guitar
- John Macy – steel guitar
- Jack Murphy – piano, synthesizer
- James Murphy – keyboards, synthesizer
- David Luell – alto sax, tenor sax, baritone sax
- Ray Bonneville – harmonica
- Michael McKinney – bass, background vocals
- Harry Wilkinson – drums, percussion
- Victor Feldman – percussion
- Deborah McColl – background vocals
- Steven Fromholz – background vocals

Production

- Jeff Guercio – producer
