= Sagebrush Symphony =

Live album by Michael Martin Murphey
- Released: September 12, 1995
- Recorded: Majestic Theater, San Antonio, Texas
- Genre: Country, cowboy music
- Length: 60:23
- Label: Warner Bros. Records
- Producer: Jim Ed Norman

Michael Martin Murphey chronology
Cowboy Songs III (1993)	Sagebrush Symphony (1995)	The Horse Legends (1997)

Professional ratings
Review scores
Source	Rating
Allmusic	2/5 stars

Sagebrush Symphony is the nineteenth album by American singer-songwriter Michael Martin Murphey, his second live album since his 1979 live/studio album Peaks, Valleys, Honkytonks and Alleys, and his first album with a symphony orchestra. Recorded live with the San Antonio Symphony Orchestra, this ambitious album, which presents cowboy songs and poems in a symphonic setting, contains a selection of Murphey's most popular songs, as well as traditional cowboy music. Murphey turns in "an impassioned performance" and the inclusion of guest artists Sons of the San Joaquin, Ric Orozco, Herb Jeffries, and Robert Mirabal "adds to the musical diversity and richness of the album."

== Track listing ==
1. "Sounds of the Range" by Michael Martin Murphey – 1:01
2. "Cowboy Overture" (Cansler) by San Antonio Symphony Orchestra, Larry Cansler – 4:17
3. "Cowboy Logic" (Cook, Rains) by Michael Martin Murphey – 4:43
4. "The Old Chisholm Trail" by Michael Martin Murphey – 2:54
5. "Down in the Valley" (Traditional) by Michael Martin Murphey – 1:49
6. "Red River Valley" by Michael Martin Murphey – 3:20
7. "Tumbling Tumbleweeds" (Nolan) by Michael Martin Murphey, Sons of the San Joaquin – 0:49
8. "Cool Water" (Nolan) by Michael Martin Murphey, Sons of the San Joaquin – 0:57
9. "Timber Trail" (Spencer) by Michael Martin Murphey, Sons of the San Joaquin – 2:22
10. "Back in the Saddle Again" (Autry, Whitley) by Herb Jeffries, Michael Martin Murphey – 3:37
11. "I'm a Happy Cowboy" (Jeffries) by Michael Martin Murphey, Herb Jeffries – 1:27
12. "Texas to a 'T'" (Foster, Pistilli) by Herb Jeffries, Michael Martin Murphey – 2:07
13. "Storm on the Prairie" (Hoffner) by Michael Martin Murphey – 0:59
14. "Riders in the Sky" (Jones) by Michael Martin Murphey – 2:49
15. "Wildfire" (Murphey, Cansler) by Michael Martin Murphey, Larry Cansler – 5:42
16. "Wind Message" (Hoffner, Mirabal) by Michael Martin Murphey, Robert Mirabal – 5:28
17. "Geronimo's Cadillac" (Murphey, Quarto) by Michael Martin Murphey – 3:15
18. "Adobe Walls" (Brown, Reed) by Michael Martin Murphey – 3:35
19. "The Yellow Rose of Texas" (Traditional) by Michael Martin Murphey – 1:12
20. "San Antonio Rose" (Wills) by Michael Martin Murphey, Rick Orozco – 3:33
21. "Happy Trails" (Evans) by Michael Martin Murphey – 4:27

== Credits ==
Music

- Michael Martin Murphey – vocals, acoustic guitar, piano, harmonica, arranger
- Christopher Wilkins – conductor
- Larry Cansler – orchestral arrangements and composer of "Cowboy Overture"
- Bergen White – orchestral arrangements
- Jack Hannah – speaking parts
- Sons of the San Joaquin – vocals
- Rick Orozco – vocals
- Herb Jeffries – vocals
- Mark Casstevens – acoustic guitar
- Chris Leuzinger – acoustic guitar, electric guitar
- Sonny Garrish – steel guitar
- Hank Singer – fiddle, mandolin
- Robert Mirabal – flute, percussion
- David Hoffner – keyboards, orchestral arrangements
- Dennis Burnside – piano, orchestral arrangements
- Joey Miskulin – accordion
- Craig Nelson – acoustic bass
- Tommy Wells – drums
- John Wesley Ryles – background vocals
- Dennis Wilson – background vocals
- Curtis Young – background vocals

Production

- Jim Ed Norman – producer
- David Hewitt – engineer
- Tim Roberts – assistant engineer
- Sean McClintock – assistant engineer
- Robert Tassi – assistant engineer
- Phil Gitomer – assistant engineer
- Jon "JD" Dickson – digital editing
- Marc Frigo – mixing assistant
- Denny Purcell – mastering
- Danny Kee – production coordination
- Jade Novak – design
- Simon Levy – art direction
- Don Cobb – digital editing
- Eric Prestidge – digital editing, mastering, mixing, producer, engineer
- William Matthews – watercolor artwork
- Wyatt McSpadden – photography
