= Never Givin' Up on Love =

Single by Michael Martin Murphey

from the album Land of Enchantment / Pink Cadillac (soundtrack)
- B-side: "Desperation Road"
- Released: April 18, 1989
- Genre: Country
- Length: 4:47
- Label: Warner Bros.
- Songwriter: Michael Smotherman
- Producer: Jim Ed Norman

Michael Martin Murphey singles chronology
"From the Word Go" (1988)	"Never Givin' Up on Love" (1989)	"Family Tree" (1989)

"Never Givin' Up on Love" is a song written by Michael Smotherman, and recorded by American country music artist Michael Martin Murphey. It was released in April 1989 as the lead single from the album Land of Enchantment. The song peaked at number 9 on the U.S. Billboard Hot Country Singles chart and at number 21 on the Canadian RPM Country Tracks chart. The song also appears on the soundtrack of the 1989 Clint Eastwood film Pink Cadillac.

== Chart performance ==
Chart (1989)	Peak position
Canada Country Singles (RPM)	21
US Hot Country Songs (Billboard)	9

=== Year-end charts ===
Chart (1989)	Position
US Country Songs (Billboard)	96
