= Cowboy Songs Four =

Studio album by Michael Martin Murphey
- Released: July 14, 1998
- Recorded: Omnisound, Nashville; Taos Recording Studio, Taos
- Genre: Country, cowboy music
- Length: 66:16
- Label: Valley Entertainment
- Producer: Ryan Murphey

Michael Martin Murphey chronology
The Horse Legends (1997)	Cowboy Songs Four (1998)	Acoustic Christmas Carols (1999)

Cowboy Songs Four is the twenty-first album by American singer-songwriter Michael Martin Murphey, his fourth album of cowboy songs, and his first album produced by his son, Ryan Murphey. The album features a guest performance by Lyle Lovett on "Farther Down the Line".

== Track listing ==
1. "Song from Lonesome Dove" (Murphey) – 4:58
2. Trail Song Medley: "Colorado Trail" / "Twilight on the Trail" / "Navaj Trail" / "Riding Down the Canyon" / "Blue Shadows on the Trail" (Note: "Colorado Trail" is public domain; "Twilight on the Trail" was written by Sidney D. Mitchell and Lewis Alter; "Navaj Trail" was written by Larry Markes, Dick Charles, and Eddie DeLang; "Riding Down the Canyon" was written by Smiley Burnett and Gene Autry; "Blue Shadows on the Trail" was written by Johnny Lang and Elliott Daniel.) – 5:47
3. "Born to Be a Cowboy" (Hampton) – 5:36
4. "Farther Down the Line" (Lovett, Goldsen) – 3:36
5. "Born to Buck Bad Luck" (Murphey) – 3:46
6. "Easy on the Pain" (Murphey, Westergen) – 3:51
7. "Utah Carroll" (Traditional) – 3:29
8. "Freewheeler" (Winchester) – 3:13
9. "Rangeland Rebel" (Murphey) – 4:46
10. "Run Toward the Light" (Murphey, Murphey) –4:10
11. "The Bunkhouse Orchestra" (Murphey) – 2:05
12. "Little Joe, the Wrangler" (Thorp, Traditional) – 4:07
13. "Summer Ranges" (Murphey) – 3:37
14. "Old Horse" (Murphey) – 5:11
15. "Night Hawk" (Murphey) – 8:04

== Credits ==
Music

- Michael Martin Murphey – vocals, acoustic guitar, harmonica, background vocals, arranger
- Ryan Murphey – electric guitar, acoustic guitar, chart, background vocals, arranger, producer
- Pat Flynn – acoustic guitar
- Sonny Garrish – steel guitar
- Jonathan Yudkin – fiddle
- Hank Singer – fiddle
- David Coe – fiddle
- Dennis Burnside – piano
- Joey Miskulin – accordion
- David Hungate – electric bass
- Craig Nelson – acoustic bass
- Bob Mater – drums
- Todd D. Smith – shouts
- Lyle Lovett – vocals

Production

- Gary Paczosa – engineer
- Craig A. Wolf – engineer
- Steve Tveit – studio manager
- Vernell Hackett – photography
