= Acoustic Christmas Carols: Cowboy Christmas II =

Studio album by Michael Martin Murphey
- Released: August 4, 1999
- Studio: St. James Episcopal Church, Taos, New Mexico
- Genre: Country, cowboy music, Christmas
- Length: 45:37
- Label: Valley Entertainment
- Producer: Joey Miskulin; Michael Martin Murphey

Michael Martin Murphey chronology
Cowboy Songs Four (1998)	Acoustic Christmas Carols: Cowboy Christmas II (1999)	Playing Favorites (2001)

Professional ratings
Review scores
Source	Rating
AllMusic	3/5 stars

Acoustic Christmas Carols: Cowboy Christmas II is the twenty-second album by American singer-songwriter Michael Martin Murphey and his second album of Christmas music. Recorded at St. James Episcopal Church in Taos, New Mexico, the church Murphey attended at the time, the album consists of carols from the nineteenth century or earlier played on acoustic instruments, among them "Silent Night" and "Joy to the World". Murphey's arrangements feature his own finger-picked guitar, accompanied by John McEuen on banjo or mandolin, or Paul Sadler on hammer dulcimer. Murphey's sons, Ryan and Brennan, play blues guitar licks on "Go Tell It on the Mountain", and his daughter, Laura, sings a duet with her father on "Silent Night". This is a "spare and reverent Christmas album, appropriate for a rustic celebration in a Western church."

== Track listing ==
1. "Home Sweet Home" (Bishop, Paine) – 2:21
2. "O Little Town of Bethlehem" (Brooks, Redner) – 4:29
3. "The First Noël" (Sandys) – 4:41
4. "In the Bleak Midwinter" (Holst, Rossetti) – 3:39
5. "Twas in the Moon of Wintertime (Huron Carole)" (Middleton, Traditional) – 2:29
6. "Away in a Manger" (Murray, Traditional) – 2:40
7. "Joy to the World" (Mason, Watts) – 2:33
8. "It Came Upon a Midnight Clear" (Sears, Willis) – 2:48
9. "We Three Kings" (Hopkins) – 4:05
10. "Go Tell It on the Mountain" (Traditional) – 3:35
11. "Silent Night" (Gruber, Mohr) – 3:37
12. "What Child Is This?" (Dix, Traditional) – 4:34
13. "I Heard the Bells on Christmas Day" (Longfellow) – 2:40
14. "Home Sweet Home" (reprise) (Bishop, Paine) – 1:26

== Credits ==
Music

- Michael Martin Murphey – vocals, guitar, tambourine, harmony vocals, arranger, producer, liner notes
- John McEuen – banjo, Indian drums, mandolin, tambourine, guitar
- Joey Miskulin – accordion, producer
- Ryan Murphey – guitar
- Paul Sadler – hammer dulcimer

Production

- Craig A. Wolf – engineer
- Dan Rudin – engineer, mixing
- Denny Purcell – mastering
- John Work – adaptation
- John F. Young – translation
