= Cowboy Classics: Playing Favorites II =

Studio album by Michael Martin Murphey
- Released: May 14, 2002
- Studio: Soundstage, Omni Sound, Nashville, Tennessee
- Genre: Country, cowboy music
- Length: 51:14
- Label: Real West Production
- Producer: Ryan Murphey

Michael Martin Murphey chronology
Playing Favorites (2001)	Cowboy Classics: Playing Favorites II (2002)	Cowboy Christmas III (2002)

Professional ratings
Review scores
Source	Rating
AllMusic	3/5 stars

Cowboy Classics: Playing Favorites II is the twenty-fourth album by American singer-songwriter Michael Martin Murphey. It is Murphey's follow-up to his 2001 compilation Playing Favorites and contains rerecorded versions of many of his cowboy songs. Murphey's attraction to the cowboy's way of life is an attempt to preserve his own cultural heritage, breathing new life into classics like "I Ride an Old Paint", "Red River Valley", and "Yellow Rose of Texas". Among the highlights of the album is a stately six-minute version of "Streets of Laredo", arranged for fiddle and piano. In the liner notes, Murphey includes a short note concerning each of the song's origins.

== Track listing ==
1. "I Ride An Old Paint" (Traditional) – 3:36
2. "Whoopie Ti-Ti-Yo" – 2:26
3. "The Old Chisholm Trail" – 4:39
4. "Strawberry Roan" – 4:15
5. "Red River Valley" – 5:41
6. "Little Joe the Wrangler" (Thorp) – 4:10
7. "The Colorado Trail" – 3:42
8. "Tying Knots In the Devils Tail" – 3:09
9. "When the Work's All Done This Fall" – 4:15
10. "The Yellow Rose of Texas" (Traditional) – 2:50
11. "Utah Carroll" – 3:45
12. "The Bard of Armagh" / "Streets of Laredo" (Traditional) – 6:58
13. "I Ride An Old Paint" (reprise) (Traditional) – 1:48

== Credits ==
Music

- Michael Martin Murphey – vocals, acoustic guitar
- Ryan Murphey – acoustic guitar, nylon strings, producer
- Pat Flynn – acoustic guitar, nylon strings
- Chris Leuzinger – acoustic & electric guitars, nylon strings
- Jonathan Yudkin – mandolin, fiddle
- David Hoffner – piano
- Joey Miskulin – accordion
- Paul Sadler – hammered dulcimer
- Craig Nelson – upright bass
- Matt Pierson – upright bass
- Bobby Blazier – drums
- Daniel Marvel – drums

Production

- Keith Compton – engineer
- Michael Page – art direction
- John Sheppard – photography
- William Matthews – cover painting, watercolor art
