= Coyotes (song) =

American Western song

Coyotes is an American Western song written by Bob McDill and closely associated with cowboy singer Don Edwards. It appears on Edwards' 1993 album Goin' Back to Texas, and was featured at the end of the 2005 Werner Herzog documentary film Grizzly Man.

The Great American Country network named Coyotes as one of their Top 20 Cowboy and Cowgirl Songs; Members of the Western Writers of America chose it as one of the Top 100 Western Songs of all time. In a 2010 interview with Cowboys & Indians magazine, Edwards said "Bob McDill wrote the song in 1984 or '85 and couldn't pitch it to anyone. He put it in a drawer in his office and forgot about it until we started recording at Warner Brothers."

The song tells the story of a cowboy whose world (the American frontier as he knew it) begins to disappear. He lists fabled things from the past that he says "are gone", including: Pancho Villa, longhorns, drovers, Comanches, outlaws, Geronimo, Sam Bass, the lion, the red wolf, Quantrill, (Note: sounds like Quantro in the song. One version he says Quanah Parker, who was a Comanche, so what sounds like Quantro may be Quanah.) and Stand Watie. At the end, the protagonist is gone, but the coyotes are still heard.

The song can also be found on the Hinges album by The Matt Poss Band.

The song was one of the records selected by British politician Rory Stewart, as part of his Desert Island Discs.
