= The Horse Legends =

Studio album by Michael Martin Murphey
- Released: July 8, 1997
- Recorded: Loft, Doghouse, Audio Media Recorders, Omni Recording Studios, Nashville, Tennessee
- Genre: Country, cowboy music
- Length: 43:17
- Label: Warner Bros. Records
- Producer: Michael Martin Murphey; Jim Ed Norman; Joey Miskulin; Steve Gibson

Michael Martin Murphey chronology
Sagebrush Symphony (1995)	The Horse Legends (1997)	Cowboy Songs Four (1998)

Professional ratings
Review scores
Source	Rating
Allmusic	3/5 stars

The Horse Legends is the twentieth album by American singer-songwriter Michael Martin Murphey. This is Murphey's tribute to the horse and contains a duet with Johnny Cash on "Tennessee Stud", cover versions of Dan Fogelberg's "Run for the Roses" and Gordon Lightfoot's "The Pony Man", and re-recordings of Murphey's "Wildfire" and "The Running Blood". The Horse Legends was the last album Murphey recorded for Warner Bros. Records.

== Track listing ==
No.	Title	Writer(s)	Length
1.	"Tennessee Stud" (with Johnny Cash)	Driftwood	4:11
2.	"Running Shadow"	Murphey	4:36
3.	"Ponies"	Bullock	3:54
4.	"Wildfire"	Murphey, Cansler	5:09
5.	"The Running Blood"	Murphey, Hoffner	4:15
6.	"See How All the Horses Come Dancing"	Murphey	5:10
7.	"Palomino Days"	Murphey	3:47
8.	"Run for the Roses"	Fogelberg	4:24
9.	"The Pony Man"	Lightfoot	3:46
10.	"Quarter Horse Rider (America's Horse)"	Murphey	4:05

== Credits ==
Music

- Michael Martin Murphey – vocals, producer
- Johnny Cash – vocals
- Biff Watson – acoustic guitar
- Larry Byrom – acoustic guitar
- Brent Mason – electric guitar
- Steve Gibson – electric guitar, producer
- Chris Leuzinger – 12-string guitar, acoustic guitar, electric guitar
- Mark Casstevens – 12-string guitar, acoustic guitar
- Sonny Garrish – steel guitar, dobro
- Mark Howard – banjo, acoustic guitar
- Hank Singer – fiddle, mandolin
- Matt Rollings – piano
- David Hoffner – piano, synthesizer
- Joey Miskulin – accordion, producer
- Michael Rhodes – electric bass
- Craig Nelson – acoustic bass, electric bass
- Mike Brignardello – bass
- Eddie Bayers – drums
- Tommy Wells – drums
- Jerry Kroon – drums
- Kenny Malone – percussion
- John Wesley Ryles – background vocals
- Lisa Silver – background vocals
- Harry Stinson – background vocals
- Gary Janney – background vocals
- Dan Keen – background vocals
- Curtis Young – background vocals
- Dennis Wilson – background vocals

Production

- Jim Ed Norman – producer
- Bob Tassi – engineer
- Rich Schirmer – engineer
- Marshall Morgan – engineer, mixing
- Toby Seay – engineer, mixing assistant
- Scott "T-Bone" Stillman – assistant engineer
- Tim Roberts – assistant engineer
- Fred Mercer – assistant engineer
- Bob Wright – assistant engineer
- Jim Eaton – assistant engineer
- Denny Purcell – mastering
- Don Cobb – editing
