= Blue Sky – Night Thunder =

Studio album by Michael Murphey
- Released: February 1975
- Genres: Country, cowboy music
- Length: 34:52
- Label: Epic
- Producer: Bob Johnston

Michael Murphey chronology
| Michael Murphey (1974) | Blue Sky – Night Thunder (1975) | Swans Against the Sun (1976) |

Singles from Blue Sky – Night Thunder
- 1. "Wildfire" Released: February 1975; 2. "Carolina in the Pines" Released: August 4, 1975

Professional ratings
Review scores
| Source | Rating |
|---|---|
| Allmusic | 4.5/5 stars |

Blue Sky – Night Thunder is the fourth album by American singer-songwriter Michael Murphey and is considered one of the seminal albums of his career. Released in 1975, it produced two major hit singles—the platinum-certified "Wildfire" and "Carolina in the Pines"—and established him as a major force in popular music. Members of the Nitty Gritty Dirt Band provided backing on some of the tracks.

The album was Murphey's most successful and reached #18 on the Billboard album chart, eventually selling 800,000 US copies. It remains his most commercially successful album to date.

== Track listing ==
1. "Wildfire" (Murphey, Larry Cansler) – 4:47
2. "Carolina in the Pines" (Murphey) – 3:54
3. "Desert Rat" (Murphey) – 3:53
4. "Wild Bird" (Murphey) – 2:24
5. "Blue Sky Riding Song" (Murphey) – 3:32
6. "Medicine Man" (Murphey, Murphey) – 3:49
7. "Secret Mountain Hideout" (Murphey, Jac Murphey) – 3:56
8. "Without My Lady There" (Murphey) – 2:33
9. "Night Thunder" (Murphey) – 2:46
10. "Rings of Life" (Murphey, Gary P. Nunn) – 3:18

== Personnel ==
Music

- Michael Murphey – vocals, guitar, harmonica, piano
- John McEuen – banjo
- Jerry Mills – mandolin
- Sam Broussard – guitar
- Richard Dean – guitar, background vocals
- Jac Murphy – keyboards
- Tom Scott – saxophone
- Michael McKinney – bass, background vocals
- Harry Wilkinson – drums
- Tracy Nelson – background vocals
- Jeff Hanna – background vocals
- Jimmy Ibbotson – background vocals

Production

- Bob Johnston – producer
- Jeff Guercio – engineer

== Charts ==
=== Weekly charts ===
| Chart (1975) | Peak position |
|---|---|
| Australian Album (Kent Music Report) | 97 |
| Canada Top Albums/CDs (RPM) | 6 |
| US Billboard 200 | 18 |

=== Year-end charts ===
| Chart (1975) | Position |
|---|---|
| Canada Top Albums/CDs (RPM) | 42 |
| US Billboard 200 | 14 |
