= Campfire on the Road =

Live album by Michael Martin Murphey
- Released: February 21, 2012
- Recorded: February 28 and March 1, 2011, Western Jubilee; Warehouse Theater, Colorado Springs, Colorado
- Genre: Country, cowboy music
- Length: 49:39
- Label: Western Jubilee; Recording Company
- Producer: Scott O'Malley

Michael Martin Murphey chronology
Tall Grass & Cool Water (2011)	Campfire on the Road (2012)	Red River Drifter (2013)

Campfire on the Road is the thirty-second album by American singer-songwriter Michael Martin Murphey, his second solo performance album, and his fourth live album. The album was recorded live February 28 and March 1, 2011 at the Western Jubilee Warehouse Theater in Colorado Springs, Colorado, and was released February 21, 2012.

== Track listing ==
1. "Intro" – 0:22
2. "Campfire on the Road" (Williamson) – 4:52
3. "Boy from the Country" (Murphey, Castleman) – 4:19
4. "Lost River" (Murphey) – 3:33
5. "Crystal" (Murphey) – 5:13
6. "Texas Morning" (Murphey, Castleman) – 4:00
7. "West Texas Highway" (Murphey, Castleman) – 3:11
8. "Spanish is the Loving Tongue" (Clark) – 6:04
9. "Old Chisholm Trial" – 8:11
10. "Geronimo's Cadillac" (Murphey) – 3:56
11. "Red River Valley" / "Campfire Reprise" – 5:58

== Credits ==
Music

- Michael Martin Murphey – vocals, guitar, photography

Production

- Nick Abbott – concert producer
- Charles Belden – cover photo
- Kathleen Fox Collins – project coordinator
- Butch Hause – engineer, mastering, mixing, producer
- Inaiah Lujan – design
- Annie McFadin – concert producer
- Scott O'Malley – producer
- Tyler O'Malley – concert producer
- David Olsen – project coordinator
- Brendan O'Malley – concert producer
- Joe Ownbey – photography
- Donna Phillips – project coordinator
