= Land of Enchantment (album) =

Studio album by Michael Martin Murphey
- Released: June 6, 1989
- Recorded: 1988–89
- Genre: Country & Western
- Length: 38:43
- Label: Warner Bros. Records
- Producer: Jim Ed Norman

Michael Martin Murphey chronology
River of Time (1988)	Land of Enchantment (1989)	Cowboy Songs (1990)

Singles from Land of Enchantment
- 1. "Never Givin' Up on Love" Released: April 18, 1989

Professional ratings
Review scores
Source	Rating
Allmusic	2.5/5 stars

Land of Enchantment is the fifteenth studio album by American singer-songwriter Michael Martin Murphey. The album reached number 33 on the Billboard Top Country Albums chart.

== Track listing ==
No.	Title	Writer(s)	Length
1.	"Never Givin' Up on Love"	Micheal Smotherman	4:47
2.	"Got to Pay the Fiddler"	Michael Martin Murphey, Don Cook, Chick Rains	4:02
3.	"Route 66"	Bobby Troup	2:47
4.	"Land of Enchantment"	Murphey, Cook, Rains	3:11
5.	"Jukebox"	Murphey, David Hoffner	3:27
6.	"Woodsmoke in the Wind"	Murphey, Cook, Rains	4:18
7.	"The Heart Knows the Truth"	Murphey, Cook, Rains	3:57
8.	"Land of the Navajo"	Peter Rowan	4:25
9.	"Desperation Road"	Murphey, Cook, Rains	4:19
10.	"Family Tree"	Thom Schuyler	3:49

== Personnel ==
Music

- Michael Martin Murphey – vocals, guitar, piano, harmonica, concept
- Steve Gibson – arranger, dobro, guitar, mandolin, backing vocals, producer
- Mark Casstevens – banjo, guitar
- Sonny Garrish – steel guitar
- Jerry Douglas – dobro
- David Hoffner – piano, synthesizer
- Joey Miskulin – accordion
- Mark O'Connor – fiddle
- Stuart Duncan – fiddle
- Herbert Hester – fiddle
- Bill Miller – flute
- Dennis Burnside – piano, synthesizer
- Charlie McCoy – harmonica
- Roy M. "Junior" Huskey – bass
- Craig Nelson – bass
- Eddie Bayers – drums
- Farrell Morris – percussion
- Jim Photoglo – backing vocals
- John Wesley Ryles – backing vocals
- Ricky Skaggs – backing vocals
- Harry Stinson – backing vocals
- Gary Janney – backing vocals
- Curtis Young – backing vocals
- Dennis Wilson – backing vocals

Production

- Jim Ed Norman – producer
- Rich Schirmer – engineer
- Keith Compton – engineer
- Carry Summers – assistant engineer
- Steve Bishir – assistant engineer
- Jeanne Kinney – assistant engineer
- Marshall Morgan – engineer, mixing
- Warren Peterson – engineer, assistant engineer
- Denny Purcell – mastering
- Carl Marsh – arranger, synthesizer, fairlight
- Danny Kee – production assistant
- Laura LiPuma – art direction, design, concept

== Chart performance ==
Chart (1989)	Peak position
U.S. Billboard Top Country Albums	33
