= Swans Against the Sun =

Studio album by Michael Martin Murphey
- Released: 1975
- Genres: Country; country rock
- Length: 41:22
- Label: Epic
- Producer: Bob Johnston

Michael Martin Murphey chronology
Blue Sky – Night Thunder (1975)	Swans Against the Sun (1975)	Flowing Free Forever (1976)

Professional ratings
Review scores
Source	Rating
Allmusic	3/5 stars

Swans Against the Sun is the fifth album by American singer-songwriter Michael Martin Murphey released in late 1975. The album features performances by John Denver, Charlie Daniels, and Willie Nelson, and peaked at number 44 on the Billboard 200.

== Track listing ==
1. "Swans Against the Sun" (Murphey) – 3:52
2. "Renegade" (Murphey, Shaw) – 6:11
3. "Rhythm of the Road" (Murphey) – 2:10
4. "Pink Lady" (Murphey) – 4:56
5. "Mansion on the Hill" (Fred Rose, Hank Williams) – 2:57
6. "Dancing in the Meadow" (Murphey) – 3:28
7. "Temple of the Sun" (Murphey) – 3:52
8. "Buffalo Gun" (Murphey) – 3:19
9. "Wild West Show" (Murphey) – 3:12
10. "Natural Bridges" (Murphey) – 3:10
11. "Seasons Change" (Clark, Lewis) – 4:15

== Personnel ==
Music

- Michael Martin Murphey – vocals, guitar, mandolin, piano, banjo, harp, harmonica, autoharp, arranger
- John Denver – guitar, vocals
- Richard Dean – guitar
- Steve Weisberg – guitar
- John Goldthwaite – guitar
- Jerry Mills – mandolin
- Mickey Raphael – harmonica
- John McEuen – banjo, dobro, fiddle, slide guitar, violin, guitar
- Charlie Daniels – fiddle, guitar, violin, vocals
- Jac Murphy – harpsichord, piano, synthesizer, arranger
- James William Guercio – bass
- Michael McKinney – bass, vocals
- Harry Wilkinson – drums, percussion
- Earl Palmer – drums
- Tracy Nelson – vocals
- Jeff Hanna – vocals
- Willie Nelson – vocals

Production

- Bob Johnston – producer
- Tony Martell – executive producer
- Larry Cansler – arranger
- Jeff Guercio – engineer
- Vic Anesini – mastering
- Don Hummell – paintings
- Ron Coro – art direction
