= Peaks, Valleys, Honky Tonks & Alleys =

Live album by Michael Martin Murphey
- Released: 1979
- Recorded: September 19 & 20, 1978 (Live); 1978 (Studio)
- Venue: The Palomino (North Hollywood)
- Studios: Westlake Studios (Los Angeles); Woodland Sound Studios (Nashville); Western Recorders (Hollywood)
- Genres: Country, cowboy music
- Length: 45:05
- Label: Epic
- Producer: John Boylan

Michael Martin Murphey chronology
Lone Wolf (1978)	Peaks, Valleys, Honky Tonks & Alleys (1979)	Hard Country (1981)

Professional ratings
Review scores
Source	Rating
Allmusic	3/5 stars

Peaks, Valleys, Honky Tonks & Alleys is the eighth album by American singer-songwriter Michael Martin Murphey and his first live album. The first five tracks were recorded at the legendary Palomino Club in North Hollywood, Los Angeles, an important West Coast country music venue. The remaining five tracks are studio recordings. The live tracks showcase Murphey's early work with some interesting twists. His "Cosmic Cowboy" turns into a breakdown, while "Another Cheap Western" is coupled with The Olympics' 1958 hit, "Western Movies". The album produced the singles "Backslider's Wine" and "Chain Gang" that peaked at numbers 92 and 93 on the Billboard Hot Country Singles chart respectively.

It was the final album in which he was credited as "Michael Murphey"—all of his subsequent releases have been under his full name.

The woman featured on the album cover with Michael was his girlfriend and future wife (1980-2001), fashion model, Mary Maciukas

== Track listing ==
1. "Cosmic Cowboy" / "Cosmic Breakdown" (Murphey) – 6:08
2. "Another Cheap Western / Western Movies" (Murphey, Cliff Goldsmith, Fred Sledge Smith) – 4:08
3. "Years Behind Bars" (Murphey) – 3:11
4. "Backslider's Wine" (Murphey) – 3:25
5. "Geronimo's Cadillac" (Murphey, Charles Quarto) – 6:47
6. "South Coast" (Murphey) – 4:05
7. "Chain Gang" (Sam Cooke) – 3:57
8. "Once a Drifter" (Murphey) – 4:41
9. "Texas Morning" (Murphey, Castleman) – 4:12
10. "Lightning" (Murphey) – 4:31

== Personnel ==
=== Musicians ===
- Michael Martin Murphey – vocals, acoustic guitar
- Sam Broussard – electric and acoustic guitar, backing vocals
- Rod Phillips – keyboards
- Jai Winding – keyboards
- Bob Glaub – bass
- Michael Botts – drums
- Don Brooks – harmonica
- Byron Berline – fiddle
- Dan Dugmore – steel guitar
- Doug Dillard – banjo
- Gary Coleman – percussion
- Tom Kelly – backing vocals
- Katy Moffatt – backing vocals
- Timothy B. Schmit – backing vocals
- Bobby Kimball – backing vocals

=== Technical ===
- Produced by John Boylan
- Engineered by Paul Grupp
