= Lone Wolf (Michael Martin Murphey album) =

Studio album by Michael Martin Murphey
- Released: 1978
- Genre: Country, cowboy music
- Label: Epic
- Producer: John Boylan

Michael Martin Murphey chronology
| Flowing Free Forever (1976) | Lone Wolf (1978) | Peaks, Valleys, Honky Tonks & Alleys (1979) |

Lone Wolf is the seventh album by American singer-songwriter Michael Martin Murphey. The album peaked at number 99 on the Billboard 200.

== Track listing ==
All tracks written by Michael Martin Murphey.

1. "Nothing Is Your Own" – 4:38
2. "Paradise Tonight" – 4:21
3. "No Man's Land" – 4:44
4. "Loners" – 7:04
5. "Song Dog" – 2:53
6. "Arrows in the Darkness" – 3:21
7. "Hard to Live Together" – 4:29
8. "Night Patrol" – 4:17
9. "Loving Time" – 4:18
10. "Song Dog" – 1:45

== Credits ==
Music

- Michael Martin Murphey – vocals, guitar, piano, harmonica
- Sam Broussard – guitar, background vocals
- Jai Winding – keyboards
- Bill Payne – horn, synthesizer, keyboards
- Dick Hyde – horn
- Steve Madaio – horn
- Jerry Jumonville – horn
- Dennis Christianson – horn
- Earl Lon Price – horn
- Bob Glaub – bass
- Mike Botts – drums
- Robert Greenidge – percussion
- Victor Feldman – percussion
- Wendy Webb – background vocals
- Joey DeLauro – background vocals

Production

- John Boylan – producer, background vocals
- Steve Hodge – engineer
- Paul Grupp – engineer
- Deni King – engineer
