= Cowboy Songs III =

Studio album by Michael Martin Murphey
- Released: October 12, 1993
- Recorded: Nightingale Recording Studio; The Reflections, Nashville, Tennessee
- Genre: Country, cowboy music
- Length: 73:30
- Label: Warner Bros. Records
- Producer: Joey Miskulin; Michael Martin Murphey

Michael Martin Murphey chronology
| Cowboy Christmas: Cowboy Songs II (1991) | Cowboy Songs III (1993) | Sagebrush Symphony (1995) |

Professional ratings
Review scores
| Source | Rating |
|---|---|
| Allmusic | 3/5 stars |

Cowboy Songs III – Rhymes of the Renegades is the eighteenth album by American singer-songwriter Michael Martin Murphey. The album is devoted to cowboy folklore and true tales of the West and focuses on real-life outlaws, from Jesse James to Billy The Kid to Belle Starr. Murphey performs these songs "with a scholar's eye and a fan's heart."

== Track listing ==
1. "Big Iron" (with Marty Robbins) (Robbins) – 4:09
2. "Rhymes of the Renegades" (Murphey) – 4:35
3. "Riders in the Sky" (Jones) – 3:28
4. "El Paso" (Robbins) – 4:52
5. "Sonora's Death Row" (Farrell) – 4:30
6. "Ballad of Billy the Kid" – 4:03
7. "Billy Gray" (with Debbie Nims) (Blake) – 4:10
8. "Roses and Thorns" (with Ryan Murphey) (Murphey) – 4:18
9. "Strawberry Roan" (with Chris LeDoux) (Fletcher) – 3:44
10. "The Wild West Is Gonna Get Wilder" (Murphey) – 4:28
11. "The Ballad of Jesse James" – 4:18
12. "Frank James' Farewell" (with Hal Ketchum) (Burr, Ketchum) – 3:41
13. "Cole Younger" (with Hal Ketchum) (Traditional) – 3:57
14. "Belle Star" (with Bill Miller) (Murphey) – 6:02
15. "Queen of Heartaches" (Murphey, Rains) – 4:23
16. "Sam Bass" (Traditional) – 4:51
17. "Birmingham Jail" – 4:52

== Credits ==
Music

- Michael Martin Murphey – vocals, producer, liner notes
- Marty Robbins – vocals
- Debbie Nims – vocals
- Hal Ketchum – vocals
- Chris LeDoux – vocals
- Bill Miller – vocals
- Sam D. Bass – author
- Pat Flynn – acoustic guitar
- Chris Leuzinger – 6-string bass, 12-string guitar, acoustic guitar, electric guitar, bass
- Mark Casstevens – acoustic guitar, harmonica, jaw harp
- John McEuen – banjo
- David Coe – mandolin
- Sonny Garrish – dobro, steel guitar
- Alisa Jones Wall – hammer dulcimer
- Joey Miskulin – accordion, piano, producer
- Dennis Burnside – piano, synthesizer
- David Hoffner – synthesizer
- Rob Hajacos – fiddle
- Sam Bush – fiddle, mandolin
- Stuart Duncan – fiddle, mandolin
- George Tidwell – trumpet
- Ryan Murphey – background vocals
- Dennis Wilson – background vocals
- Roy M. "Junior" Husky – acoustic and electric bass
- Craig Nelson – acoustic and electric bass
- Roy Huskey, Jr. – acoustic and electric bass
- Lonnie Wilson – drums, percussion
- Tommy Wells – drums, percussion
- Sam Bacco – Percussion

Production

- Toby Seay – engineer
- Gary Paczosa – engineer
- Ed Simonton – engineer, assistant engineer
- John Kunz – assistant, assistant engineer
- Marshall Morgan – mixing
- Denny Purcell – mastering
- Patricia Miskulin – production coordination
- Laura LiPuma – art direction
- William Matthews – cover design
- Prof. Thomas Dimsdale – liner notes
- Garrett Rittenberry – design
- David Michael Kennedy – photography
- Willie Matthews – paintings
