= Larry Cansler =

- Born: May 9, 1940 (age 85); Dallas, Texas, United States
- Occupations: Composer; arranger; conductor; musical director; pianist
- Instrument: Piano

Larry Lee Cansler (born 9 May 1940 in Dallas, Texas) is an American composer, arranger, conductor, musical director, and pianist. Over a lengthy career he has collaborated with Kenny Rogers, Lionel Richie, Roger Miller, The Smothers Brothers, Michael Martin Murphey, Mason Williams, The Jackson Five, Pam Tillis, Collin Raye, and many others. Cansler has contributed scores to several films, dramatic television series, musical variety shows, and over 800 national television and radio commercials. He has conducted various major symphony orchestras and produced three albums of his own instrumental music.

== Career ==
Cansler started his musical career by majoring in music composition at North Texas State University. After attending college and serving in the army, he moved to Los Angeles. There he connected with fellow Texan Kenny Rogers, who had just formed the rock group The First Edition. Rogers asked Cansler to come on board as keyboardist, musical director, and arranger. During this time Cansler joined the writing staff at Screen Gems and began writing songs with Michael Martin Murphey. Cansler and Murphey composed an 18-song concept album, The Ballad of Calico, for The First Edition, and together penned the pop hit "Wildfire", which sold over five million copies.

During the 1970s Cansler arranged and conducted for many popular groups, including The Jackson Five and The Temptations. He began composing film scores and during the course of several years composed the scores for many movies and television shows including the Gambler series (starring Kenny Rogers), The Smothers Brothers Twentieth Reunion, and The Kenny Rogers and Dolly Parton Christmas Special. He scored Songwriter, starring Willie Nelson and Kris Kristofferson, composed the music for Robert Redford's short subject A Short Film On Solar Energy, and received an Emmy nomination for his main theme for the CBS Sports Spectacular.

In 1986 Cansler composed his first symphonic work after receiving a grant from the Foundation for New American Music. His symphony, entitled "Mojave", was inspired by his lifelong love of flying. The piece included a text written by John Stewart (formerly with the Kingston Trio) and was narrated by Mercury astronaut Scott Carpenter. "Mojave" was premiered at the Dorothy Chandler Pavilion in Los Angeles and has been performed at the Kennedy Center in Washington, D.C.

During this period Cansler, a longtime private pilot, joined the Rutan Voyager support team as a press spokesman. This role led to his announcing and producing airshows around the United States. He and Dick Rutan jointly produced an airshow at Langkawi Island, Malaysia, featuring American airshow pilots and skydivers and a MiG 29 demonstration team from the Russian Air Force.

== Personal life ==
Cansler resides in Arizona and California with his wife, a registered nurse. He has two daughters from a previous marriage.

== Discography ==
- Pacific Dreams (1988)
- Indian Paintbrush: Sketches of the Southwest (1990)
