= Tumbling Tumbleweeds =

1934 song by Bob Nolan

Single by Sons of the Pioneers
- B-side: "Moonlight on the Prairie"
- Written: 1929-1934
- Published: July 12, 1934 by Sam Fox Publishing Co., Cleveland, Ohio, Williamson Music, Inc.
- Released: November 10, 1934
- Recorded: August 8, 1934
- Studio: Decca Studios, Los Angeles
- Genre: Western Music
- Length: 2:48
- Label: Decca 5047
- Songwriter: Bob Nolan

"Tumbling Tumbleweeds" is a Western music song composed by Bob Nolan, a founding member of the Sons of the Pioneers. Nolan wrote the song in the early 1930s while he was working as a caddy and living in Los Angeles. It was first recorded by the Sons of the Pioneers in 1934, and it became one of the most famous songs associated with the group. Originally titled "Tumbling Leaves", the song was reworked into the title "Tumbling Tumbleweeds" and into more widespread fame with the 1935 film of the same name starring Gene Autry. Members of the Western Writers of America chose it as one of the Top 100 Western songs of all time.

== Cover versions ==
- The Sons of the Pioneers first recorded the song for Decca on August 8, 1934, and it enjoyed chart success that year. Their 1934 recording was selected by the Library of Congress as a 2010 addition to the National Recording Registry, which selects recordings annually that are "culturally, historically, or aesthetically significant". Their 1946 version of the song was featured in the 1998 film The Big Lebowski, though it did not appear on the soundtrack release.
- Gene Autry recorded his version on January 11, 1935, at ARC Studios, New York City.
- Bing Crosby recorded the song with John Scott Trotter's Orchestra in Los Angeles 9 February 1940. This version reached the No. 12 position in the charts of the day during a 7-week stay. Crosby recorded the song again in 1954 for his album Bing: A Musical Autobiography.
- Kate Smith recorded the song on June 1, 1945 for Columbia (36871) and it is available on her CD 16 Most Requested Songs.
- Jazz trombonist J. J. Johnson recorded a version of "Tumbling Tumbleweeds" in the 1956 album J Is for Jazz.
- Slim Whitman had a top twenty hit in the UK with "Tumbling Tumbleweeds" in 1956.
- Roger Williams (pianist) recorded his version of "Tumbling Tumbleweeds" that reached #60 in US in 1956.
- Pat Boone recorded a version of "Tumbling Tumbleweeds" with his wife Shirley Boone on their 1959 album "Side by Side".
- Johnnie Ray recorded his version for the 1959 album On the Trail.
- Jazz guitarist Grant Green recorded a version in 1962, which was released on the 1969 album Goin' West, and features Herbie Hancock on piano.
- Film actor Clint Eastwood recorded a version on his 1962 album Cowboy Favorites.
- Frankie Laine recorded a version on his 1962 album Call of the Wild.
- Lorne Greene recorded the song for his 1965 album American West.
- The Supremes covered the song on their 1965 album The Supremes Sing Country, Western & Pop, although it was recorded two years earlier. Diana Ross sings lead.
- Harry James recorded a version on his 1966 album Harry James & His Western Friends (Dot DLP 3735 and DLP 25735).
- In the song "Turn on, Tune in, Drop Out" by The Fugs on their 1968 album Tenderness Junction, the chorus of "Tumbling Tumbleweeds" is sung over part of the instrumental section.
- Don Everly recorded a version in 1970. It is the opening track on the album Don Everly.
- Michael Nesmith covered the song with his band The First National Band on their album Nevada Fighter, released in 1971.
- Marty Robbins recorded a version on his 1979 album All Around Cowboy.
- Leo Kottke recorded a version on his 1981 album Guitar Music.
- Meat Puppets recorded a cover on their 1982 self-titled debut album.
- Michael Martin Murphey recorded a version on his 1990 album Cowboy Songs.
- Element of Crime released a version of on their 1996 album Die schönen Rosen.
- Punch Brothers played the song live at New York City Town Hall in 2013 at a promotional concert for the film Inside Llewyn Davis. The concert was later released as an album.

== Film appearances ==
- 1935 – Tumbling Tumbleweeds
- 1943 – Silver Spurs – Performed by Roy Rogers and the Sons of the Pioneers
- 1944 – Hollywood Canteen – Sung by Sons of the Pioneers
- 1945 – Don't Fence Me In – Sung by Roy Rogers, Dale Evans and the Sons of the Pioneers
- 1978 – Happy Days – Sung by Anson Williams at the end of part three of "Westward Ho"
- 1982 – M*A*S*H "Pressure Points"
- 1991 – City Slickers
- 1998 – The Big Lebowski
- 2000 – Two of Us
- 2020 – Nomadland
- 2021 - Cry Macho
