= Tall Grass & Cool Water =

Studio album by Michael Martin Murphey
- Released: June 28, 2011
- Recorded: May 2008, June 2009; Omni Sound Studios, Nashville, Tennessee (Note: The James Gang Trilogy (tracks 8–10) was recorded and mixed at Bumpin' Heads Studio in Nashville, Tennessee in 2011.)
- Genre: Country, bluegrass, cowboy music
- Length: 51:52
- Label: Rural Rhythm Records
- Producer: Ryan Murphey

Michael Martin Murphey chronology
Buckaroo Blue Grass II (2010)	Tall Grass & Cool Water (2011)	Campfire on the Road (2012)

Tall Grass & Cool Water is the thirty-first album by American singer-songwriter Michael Martin Murphey.

== Track listing ==
1. "Texas Cowboy" (Murphey) – 2:56
2. "Cool Water" (Nolan) – 5:21
3. "Santa Fe Trail" (Murphey) – 4:01
4. "Way Out There" (Nolan) – 4:21
5. "The Railroad Corral" (Murphey) – 4:08
6. "Partner to the Wind" (Murphey) – 4:50
7. "Trusty Lariat" (Murphey) – 4:12
8. "Ballad of Cole Younger" (Murphey) – 4:56
9. "Ballad of Jesse James" (Murphey) – 4:34
10. "Frank James Farewell" (Burr, Ketchum) – 4:28
11. "Blue Prairie" (Nolan, Spencer, Taft) – 3:42
12. "Springtime in the Rockies" (Murphey) – 4:23

== Credits ==
Music

- Michael Martin Murphey – vocals, acoustic guitar, executive producer
- Ryan Murphey – acoustic guitar, mandolin, producer
- Carin Mari – vocals
- Pat Flynn – lead acoustic guitar
- Andy Hall – dobro
- Charlie Cushman – banjo
- Troy Engle – banjo, fiddle
- Sam Bush – mandolin, fiddle
- Andy Leftwich – mandolin, fiddle
- Craig Nelson – acoustic bass
- Matt Pierson – acoustic bass

Production

- Keith Compton – engineer
- Charles Engel – album art
- Joe Ownbey – photography

== Chart performance ==
Chart (2011)	Peak position
U.S. Billboard Top Bluegrass Albums	4
