= Michael Murphey (album) =

Studio album by Michael Martin Murphey
- Released: April 1974
- Recorded: Nashville, Tennessee
- Genre: Progressive country
- Length: 37:18
- Label: Epic
- Producer: Bob Johnston

Michael Martin Murphey chronology
Cosmic Cowboy Souvenir (1973)	Michael Murphey (1974)	Blue Sky – Night Thunder (1975)

Professional ratings
Review scores
Source	Rating
Allmusic	3/5 stars

Michael Murphey is the third album by American singer-songwriter Michael Martin Murphey and his first for Epic Records, released in 1974.

== Track listing ==
1. "Nobody's Gonna Tell Me How to Play My Music" (Murphey) – 4:19
2. "Healing Springs" (Murphey) – 5:24
3. "Rye by-the-Sea" (Murphey) – 3:10
4. "You Can Only Say So Much" (Murphey) – 3:24
5. "Observer" (Murphey) – 5:06
6. "Holy Roller" (Murphey) – 3:59
7. "Good Ol' Natural Habits" (Craig Hillis) – 3:17
8. "Fort Worth I Love You" (Murphey) – 1:47
9. "Ace in the Hole" (Murphey) – 3:02
10. "Southwestern Pilgrimage" (Murphey) – 3:43

== Personnel ==
Music

- Michael Martin Murphey – vocals, guitar, harmonica, piano, organ, concertina
- Herb Steiner – fiddle, mandolin, steel guitar
- Buddy Spicher – fiddle
- Craig Hillis – guitar
- Bill Farmer – piano
- Bob Holmes – organ
- Tommy Cogbill – bass
- Kenneth A. Buttrey – drums, percussion
- John Hill – drums
- Patricia Henderson – background vocals
- Pat Henderson – vocals
- Clydie King – vocals, background vocals
- Pat Powdrill – vocals, background vocals
- Andy Johnston – vocals, background vocals
- Merry Clayton – vocals, background vocals

Production

- Bob Johnston – producer
- Ben Tallent – engineer
