= Lone Cowboy =

Live album by Michael Martin Murphey
- Released: January 12, 2010
- Recorded: October 2008; Western Jubilee; Warehouse Theater, Colorado Springs, Colorado
- Genre: Country, cowboy music
- Length: 50:57
- Label: Western Jubilee Recording Co.
- Producer: Scott O'Malley

Michael Martin Murphey chronology
Buckaroo Blue Grass (2009)	Lone Cowboy (2010)	Buckaroo Blue Grass II (2010)

Professional ratings
Review scores
Source	Rating
Allmusic	3.5/5 stars

Lone Cowboy: Live & Solo is the twenty-ninth album by American singer-songwriter Michael Martin Murphey, his first solo album, and his third live album. The album was recorded live in October 2008 at the Western Jubilee Warehouse Theater in Colorado Springs, Colorado, and was released January 12, 2010.

== Track listing ==
1. "Lone Cowboy" / "Carolina in the Pines" (Murphey) – 6:04
2. "Partner to the Wind" / "Cool Water" (Murphey, Nolan) – 5:42
3. "Little Joe the Wrangler" / "Oh Bury Me Not on the Lone Prairie" – 6:17
4. "Long and Lonesome Road to Dalhart" (Murphey) – 4:49
5. "Wildfire" (Cansler, Murphey) – 3:36
6. "When the Work's All Done This Fall" – 4:01
7. "What Am I Doing Here?" (Cook, Murphey, Rains) – 2:56
8. "Vanishing Breed" (Hoffner, Murphey) – 3:50
9. "Cherokee Fiddle" (Murphey) – 4:31
10. "Close to the Land" (Murphey, Quist) – 5:39
11. "Summer Ranges" (Murphey) – 3:32

== Credits ==
Music

- Michael Martin Murphey – vocals, guitar, composer, liner notes

Production

- Hal Cannon – quotation author
- Kathleen Fox Collins – concert producer, design
- David Glasser – mastering
- Butch Hause – engineer, mixing, producer
- Donald Kallaus – design, photography
- Annie McFadin – concert producer
- Tyler O'Malley – concert producer
- Brendan O'Malley – concert producer
- Scott O'Malley – producer
- Jerry Riness – cover art, cover painting
- Victoria Ward – concert producer, design
- Woody Woodworth – concert producer
