= High Stakes (album) =

Studio album by Michael Martin Murphey
- Released: April 22, 2016
- Recorded: 2015
- Genre: Country, bluegrass, cowboy
- Label: Murphey Kinship Recordings
- Producer: Bobby Blazier

Michael Martin Murphey chronology
Red River Drifter (2013)	High Stakes (2016)

High Stakes is the thirty-fourth album by American singer-songwriter Michael Martin Murphey, released on April 22, 2016.

== Track listing ==
1. "High Stakes" – Michael Martin Murphey
2. "Campfire on the Road" – John Robert Williamson
3. "Running Gun" – Jim Glaser
4. "Emila Farewell" – Michael Martin Murphey
5. "Master's Call" – Marty Robbins
6. "The Drover Road to Amulree" – David John Wilkie
7. "The Betrayal of Johnnie Armstrong" – David John Wilkie
8. "Three Sons" – John Robert Williamson
9. "I've Got the Guns" – Roger William Creager
10. "Honor Bound" – Michael Martin Murphey
11. "The End of The Road" – Michael Martin Murphey

== Credits ==
=== Music ===
- Michael Martin Murphey – vocals, acoustic guitar, banjo
- Ryan Murphey – acoustic guitar, mandolin, background vocals
- Chris Leuzinger – electric guitar, acoustic guitar
- Tim Lauer – keyboards
- Jonathan Yudkin – fiddle, cello, bouzouki
- David Coe – fiddle
- Al Perkins – steel guitar
- Pat Flynn – acoustic guitar, 12-string guitar
- Jim Hoke – accordion
- Matt Pierson – electric and acoustic bass

=== Production ===
- Michael Martin Murphey – executive producer
- Bobby Blazier – producer
- Jeremy Hunter – engineer
- Brennan – album design
