= Hard Country (album) =

Soundtrack album by Michael Martin Murphey
- Released: 1981
- Genre: Country, soundtrack
- Label: Epic
- Producer: Michael Martin Murphey

Michael Martin Murphey chronology
Peaks, Valleys, Honky Tonks & Alleys (1979)	Hard Country (1981)	Michael Martin Murphey (1982)

Professional ratings
Review scores
Source	Rating
Allmusic	2/5 stars

Hard Country is the ninth album by American singer-songwriter Michael Martin Murphey and his first soundtrack album. The 1981 film Hard Country stars Jan-Michael Vincent and Kim Basinger.

== Track listing ==
1. "Cowboy Cadillac" (Murphey) by Michael Martin Murphey– 4:04
2. "Hard Country" (Murphey) by Michael Martin Murphey – 4:04
3. "Hard Partyin' Country Darlin'" (Murphey) by Michael Martin Murphey – 3:02
4. "Texas (When I Die)" (Bobby Borchers, Ed Bruce, Patsy Bruce) by Tanya Tucker – 4:48
5. "Cosmic Cowboy/Cowboy Breakdown" (Murphey) by Michael Martin Murphey – 3:50
6. "Break My Mind" (John D. Loudermilk) by Michael Martin Murphey – 2:18
7. "Take It As It Comes" (Murphey) by Michael Martin Murphey – 3:04
8. "Somebody Must Have Loved You Right Last Night" (Bell) by Tanya Tucker – 3:28
9. "I'm Gonna Love You Anyway" (Martine) by Tanya Tucker – 2:01
10. "I Love You So Much It Hurts" (Tillman) by Jerry Lee Lewis – 2:18
11. "West Texas Waltz" (Hancock) by Joe Ely – 4:57

== Credits ==
Music

- Michael Martin Murphey – vocals, guitar, piano, harmonica
- Tanya Tucker – vocals
- Joe Ely – vocals
- Jerry Lee Lewis – vocals
- Linda Ronstadt – vocals

Production

- Chip Young – producer (10)
- Jerry Crutchfield – producer (8)
- Jerry Goldstein – producer (3)
- Michael Murphey – producer (1, 2, 4–6)
- Mike Chapman – producer (7)
- Deni King – engineering
