= Wildfire (Michael Martin Murphey song) =

Single by Michael Murphey

from the album Blue Sky – Night Thunder
- B-side: "Night Thunder"
- Released: February 1975
- Studio: Ray Stevens Sound Laboratory, Nashville, Tennessee
- Genre: Country; soft rock
- Length: 3:15 (single edit); 4:47 (LP version)
- Label: Epic
- Songwriters: Michael Murphey, Larry Cansler
- Producer: Bob Johnston

Michael Murphey singles chronology
"Fort Worth I Love You" (1974)	"Wildfire" (1975)	"Carolina in the Pines" (1975)

"Wildfire" is a song written by Michael Murphey and Larry Cansler. It was originally recorded by Murphey, who had yet to add his middle name to his recorded work, and appears on his gold-plus 1975 album Blue Sky – Night Thunder.

Released in February 1975 as the album's lead single, "Wildfire" became Murphey's highest-charting pop hit in the United States. The somber story song hit No. 2 in Cash Box and No. 3 on the Billboard Hot 100 in June 1975. Additionally, it hit the top of the Billboard Adult Contemporary chart, displacing "Love Will Keep Us Together".

The single continued to sell, eventually receiving platinum certification from the RIAA, signifying sales of over two million US copies. In 2010, members of the Western Writers of America chose it as one of the Top 100 Western songs of all time.

Murphy re-recorded this song with American country singer Cody Johnson and released it on September 19, 2025.

== Background ==
Murphey and Cansler co-wrote "Wildfire" in 1968, the same year Murphey emerged as a solo artist. From earlier in the decade, he had been part of a duo known as the Lewis & Clark Expedition, with singer-songwriter Boomer Castleman. They appeared and performed in an episode of the TV sitcom I Dream of Jeannie.

When Murphey rerecorded "Wildfire" for a new album in 1997, he was quoted by Billboard as saying that what many consider his signature song "broke my career wide open and, on some level, still keeps it fresh. Because that song appeals to kids, and always has, it's kept my career fresh."

In a 2008 interview, Murphey talked about the origins of the song and the context in which it was written. He was a third-year student at UCLA, working on a concept album for Kenny Rogers (The Ballad of Calico). The work was demanding, sometimes taking more than 20 hours a day. One night, he dreamed the song in its totality, writing it up in a few hours the next morning. He believes the song came to him from a story his grandfather told him when he was a little boy – a prominent Native American legend about a ghost horse. Murphey did not have a horse named Wildfire until a few years before the interview, when he gave that name to a palomino mare.

== Content ==
The lyrics are those of a homesteader telling the story of a young Nebraska woman said to have died searching for her escaped pony, "Wildfire", during a blizzard. The homesteader finds himself in a similar situation, doomed in an early winter storm. A hoot owl has perched outside of his window for six nights, and the homesteader believes the owl is a sign that the ghost of the young woman is calling for him. He hopes to join her (presumably in heaven) and spend eternity riding Wildfire with her, leaving the difficulties of earthly life behind.

The song has a piano intro and outro which was edited out for radio. The introduction is based on a piece, Prelude in D-flat, Op. 11 No. 15, by the Russian classical composer Alexander Scriabin.

== Personnel ==
- Michael Murphey – vocals, piano
- Jac Murphy – piano (intro and outro)
- Sam Broussard – guitar
- Richard Dean – guitar, background vocals
- Michael McKinney – bass, background vocals
- Harry Wilkinson – drums
- Jeff Hanna – background vocals
- Jimmy Ibbotson – background vocals
- John McEuen – mandolin

== Chart performance ==
=== Weekly charts ===
Chart (1975)	Peak position
Australia (Kent Music Report)	22
Canada Top Singles (RPM)	1
Canada Adult Contemporary Tracks (RPM)	1
New Zealand (Recorded Music NZ)	12
U.S. Billboard Hot 100	3
U.S. Billboard Easy Listening	1
U.S. Cash Box Top 100	2

=== Year-end charts ===
Chart (1975)	Rank
Canada RPM Top Singles	33
U.S. Billboard Hot 100	39
U.S. Billboard Easy Listening	19
U.S. Cash Box	54

== In popular culture ==
In 2007, the host of The Late Show, David Letterman, developed a sudden fascination with "Wildfire", discussing the song and its lyrics — particularly the line about "leave sodbustin' behind" — with bandleader Paul Shaffer over the course of several weeks. This ultimately led to Murphey's being invited on the show to perform "Wildfire". Letterman described the song as "haunting and disturbingly mysterious, but always lovely," and surmised that the performance would leave the studio audience with "a palpable sense of ... mysticism, melancholy ... and uplifting well-being."

In a third-season episode of The Simpsons named "Lisa's Pony", Lisa played the song for her pony with her saxophone. She introduced the song by saying "This next song is also about a girl and her pony. It's called 'Wildfire'."

The song has occasionally appeared in "bad song" surveys, such as one by the humor columnist Dave Barry during the 1990s. He quoted one reader who, referring to the song's tale of the loss of a woman and a pony in a "killing frost", pointed out that "'killing' in 'killing frost' refers to your flowers and your garden vegetables, and when one is forecast you should cover your tomatoes ... Nobody ever got lost in a killing frost who wouldn't get lost in July as well.".

== See also ==
- List of number-one adult contemporary singles of 1975 (U.S.)
