= Carolina in the Pines =

Single by Michael Murphey

from the album Blue Sky – Night Thunder
- B-side: "Without My Lady There"
- Released: August 4, 1975 (original release); May 6, 1985 (re-release)
- Genre: Country
- Length: 4:08
- Label: Epic
- Songwriter: Michael Murphey
- Producer: Bob Johnston

Michael Murphey singles chronology
"Wildfire" (1975)	"Carolina in the Pines" (1975)	"Renegade" (1976)

"Carolina in the Pines" is a song written and recorded by American country music artist Michael Martin Murphey. It was released in August 1975 as the second and final single from the album Blue Sky - Night Thunder. It peaked at number 21 on the U.S. Billboard Hot 100 chart, number 4 on the Adult Contemporary chart, and number 25 on the Canadian RPM Top Singles chart in late 1975. The song was re-recorded with John McEuen on banjo and released in May 1985 from his compilation album The Best of Michael Martin Murphey. The re-release peaked at number 9 on the U.S. Billboard Hot Country Singles chart and at number 11 on the Canadian RPM Country Tracks chart in mid-1985. Bluegrass band The Special Consensus recorded the song on their 2002 album Route 10.

== Background ==
"Carolina in the Pines" describes Murphey's wife whose actual name was Caroline: "I tried to write a love song about my wife without trying to relegate her to a secondary position as a supporter of me. I tried to make it about her as an individual. That's what [she and I] try to do in life. Caroline Hogue was the second of Murphey's five wives: the couple had married in 1973 and would divorce in 1978.

== Critical reception ==
Billboard magazine reviewed the song favorably, calling it "a countryish tune in a distinct John Denver vein."

== Personnel ==
- Michael Murphey – vocals
- Jac Murphy – piano
- John McEuen - banjo

== Chart performance ==
=== Original release ===
Chart (1975)	Peak position
Canadian RPM Adult Contemporary	4

=== Re-release ===
Chart (1985)	Peak position
US Hot Country Songs (Billboard)	9
Canadian RPM Country Tracks	11
