= Don Edwards (cowboy singer) =

American singer and guitarist (1939–2022)

Background information
- Born: Donald Edward Hezlitt; March 20, 1939 (Note: The Santa Clarita Valley Signal reports that Edwards's age when he died on October 23, 2022, as 86, which would make his birth year 1935 or 1936. However, AllMusic reports Edwards's date of birth as March 20, 1939. The use of AllMusic for biographical details is not fully supported by Wikipedia editors (see WP:RSP), so it is not being used in this article to verify his date of birth unless subsequent reports clarify his birth date. AllMusic is, however, being used to verify his place of birth.); Boonton, New Jersey, U.S.
- Died: October 23, 2022 (aged 83) Hico, Texas, U.S.
- Genres: Country, Western, Americana
- Occupation: Singer-songwriter
- Instruments: Vocals, guitar
- Years active: 1961-2022
- Labels: Texas Skyline, Sevenshoux, Warner Bros., Shanachie, Western Jubilee,
- Website: donedwardsmusic.com

Don Edwards (March 20, 1939 – October 23, 2022) was an American cowboy singer, guitarist, and recording artist who specialized in Western music. Two of his albums, Guitars & Saddle Songs and Songs of the Cowboy, are included in the Folklore Archives of the Library of Congress.

Edwards released more than a dozen solo albums from 1980 through 2010, as well as a greatest hits collection. He also recorded the album High Lonesome Cowboy with Peter Rowan, Tony Rice, and Norman Blake, three leading bluegrass musicians.

== Biography ==
Edwards was born in Boonton, New Jersey, on March 20, 1939. He left home at the age of 16 to work on Texas oil fields and experience the western life. He made his professional debut in 1961 after he was hired as a singer, actor, and stuntman at the newly opened Six Flags Over Texas. He worked there for five years before moving to Nashville to seek a recording contract. In 1993, he appeared on Nanci Griffith's Grammy Award-winning album Other Voices, Other Rooms on which he accompanied Griffith on a Michael Burton song entitled "Night Rider's Lament".

In 2005, Edwards was inducted into the Western Music Association Hall of Fame.

Edwards died on October 23, 2022, at the age of 83.

== In popular culture ==
Edwards played the character Smokey in Robert Redford's The Horse Whisperer. Edwards also performed the song "Coyotes" that plays during the final minutes of the documentary Grizzly Man.

== Discography ==
- 1980 Happy Cowboy
- 1990 Desert Nights and Cowtown Blues
- 1991 Chant of the Wanderer
- 1992 Songs of the Trail
- 1993 Goin' Back To Texas
- 1994 The Bard and the Balladeer: Live from Cowtown (with Waddie Mitchell)
- 1996 West Of Yesterday
- 1997 Saddle Songs (a collection of the albums Guitars & Saddle Songs and Songs of the Cowboy)
- 1998 Best Of Don Edwards
- 1998 My Hero, Gene Autry: A Tribute
- 2000 Prairie Portrait
- 2001 On the Trail (with Waddie Mitchell)
- 2001 Kin To The Wind: Memories Of Martin Robbins
- 2004 Last Of The Troubadours: Saddle Songs Vol. 2
- 2004 High Lonesome Cowboy (with Peter Rowan)
- 2006 Moonlight & Skies
- 2009 Heaven on Horseback
- 2010 American
- 2013 Just Me and My Guitar
