= Cherokee Fiddle =

Single by Johnny Lee and Friends

from the album Sounds Like Love
- B-side: "You Know Me"
- Released: October 4, 1982
- Genre: Country
- Length: 3:59
- Label: Asylum
- Songwriter(s): Michael Martin Murphey
- Producer(s): Jim Ed Norman, John Boylan

Johnny Lee and Friends singles chronology
"When You Fall in Love" (1982)	"Cherokee Fiddle" (1982)	"Sounds Like Love" (1983)

"Cherokee Fiddle" is a song written by Michael Martin Murphey. Murphey's version of the song went to number 58 on the Hot Country Singles chart in 1977. The story is based on a fiddle player named "Scooter"; his real name was Dean Kirk. He was of Choctaw Indian and Irish descent. Having taken lessons as a child from Clayton McMichen, he played the fiddle his entire life. He once worked with the country music and movie star Rex Allen. In his later years he played at the narrow gauge train station in Silverton, Colorado.

In 1979, the song was recorded by American country music artist Johnny Lee. His version was included on the soundtrack album for the 1980 motion picture Urban Cowboy. A remixed version was re-released in October 1982 as the first single from Lee's album Sounds Like Love. This version reached number 10 on the Billboard Hot Country Singles chart. The 1982 remix features backing vocals from Murphey and Rosemary Butler and fiddle by Charlie Daniels, while the original 1979 mix features backing vocals from Butler, Marcy Levy and Tom Kelly and fiddle by Byron Berline. Furthermore, Lee did a complete re-recording of the song for his 1990 compilation "The Best of Johnny Lee".

== Chart performance ==
=== Michael Martin Murphey ===
Chart (1977)	Peak position
US Hot Country Songs (Billboard)	58

=== Johnny Lee ===
Chart (1982)	Peak position
US Hot Country Songs (Billboard)	10
Canadian RPM Country Tracks	24
