= Ryan Murphey =

American singer-songwriter

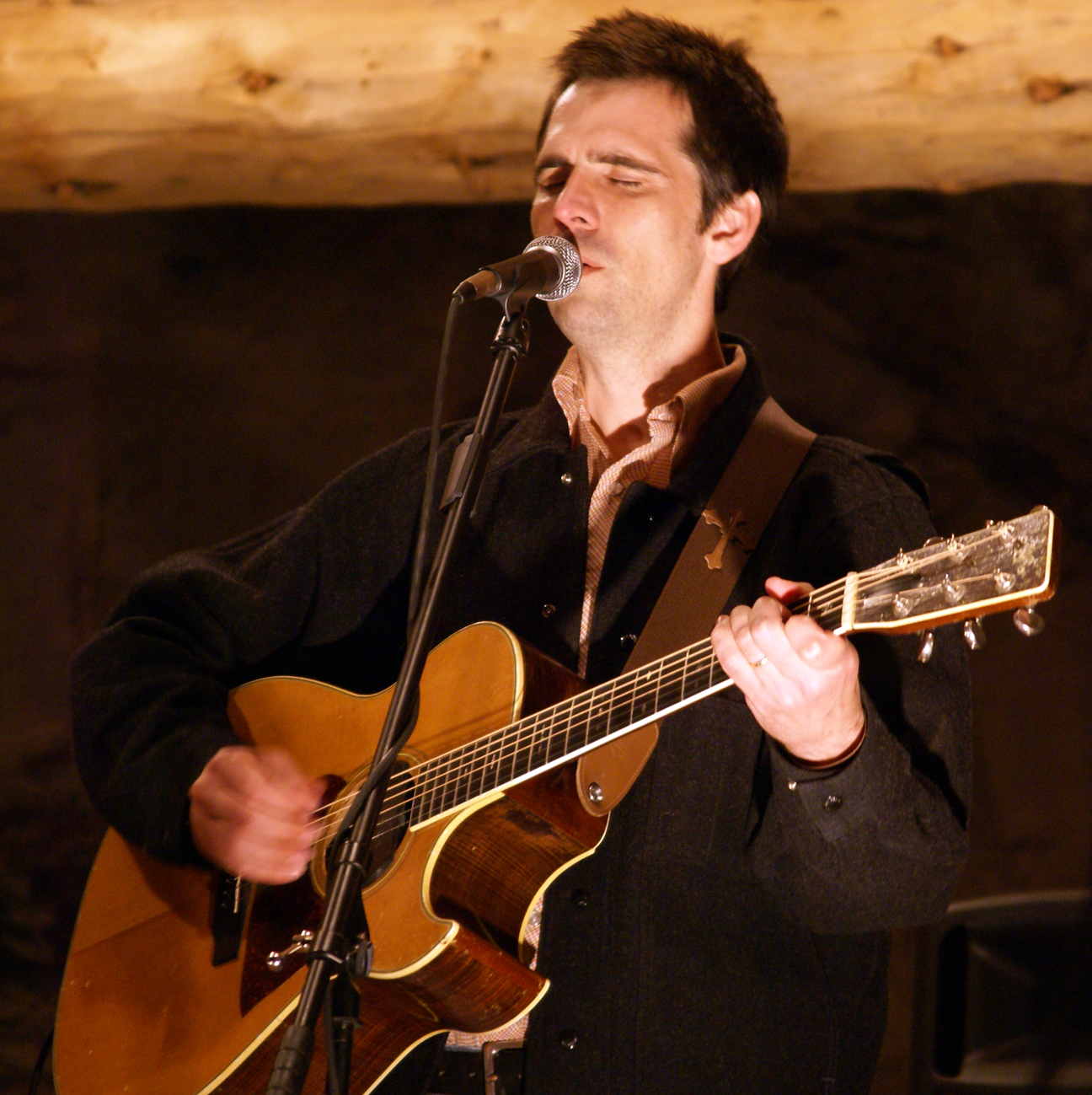
- Ryan Murphey at the Sportsman's Texaco in Lake City, Colorado on July 2, 2009

Background information
- Genres: Western, country, folk, pop, bluegrass
- Occupation(s): Record producer, guitarist, songwriter, singer, teacher
- Instrument(s): Guitar, mandolin
- Years active: 1988–present
- Labels: Warner Bros., Real West Productions, Wildfire Productions, Rural Rhythm

Ryan Murphey is a Grammy-nominated music producer, songwriter, guitarist, and vocalist. Since 1988, Ryan has toured with his father, Michael Martin Murphey, as lead guitarist and vocalist in the Rio Grande Band. Ryan is Michael's oldest son, and has worked with his father extensively throughout most of his career. In 1988, Ryan and Michael recorded the duet, "Talkin' to the Wrong Man", which was released on Michael's River of Time album.

Ryan produced several Michael Martin Murphey albums, including Buckaroo Blue Grass and Buckaroo Blue Grass II, which were both nominated for Grammy Awards. Ryan also produced Michael's latest album, Tall Grass & Cool Water, released in June 2011.

Ryan Murphey has released four albums of original songs: Good Eats Cafe, Ruby Red, Miracle Street, and New Old Song. He is currently working on music with a new trio, the Sawdust Brothers.

Ryan lives in Nashville, Tennessee with his wife Francie and two daughters, Fiona and Elle. In addition to his musical career, Ryan teaches English and is the Head of the Guitar Department at Nashville School of the Arts.

== Discography ==
=== Guest singles ===
Year	Single	Artist	Peak chart positions		Album
Year	Single	Artist	US Country	CAN Country	Album
1988	"Talkin' to the Wrong Man"	Michael Martin Murphey	4	1	River of Time
