= Bill Walker (music director) =

American composer and conductor (1927–2022)

- Born: April 28, 1927; Sydney, New South Wales, Australia
- Died: May 26, 2022 (aged 95) Nashville, Tennessee, U.S.
- Genres: Country, pop
- Occupations: Composer, arranger, producer, musical director
- Years active: 1959-2022

William Alfred Walker (April 28, 1927 – May 26, 2022) was an Australian-born American composer and conductor.

== Career ==
Born in Sydney, Australia, he attended the NSW State Conservatorium of Music before moving to South Africa.

In 1959, he began working at RCA Records in Johannesburg, South Africa. One of Walker's tasks was to arrange, conduct and record cover versions of songs that were popular in America. While there, he worked with many country stars who were touring Africa, including Jim Reeves. Reeves also filmed the movie Kimberley Jim in South Africa, for which Walker wrote the score. Reeves offered Walker the post of musical director on a new television series he was set to host. Walker moved to the United States and arrived in Nashville, TN just in time to learn that Reeves had died in a plane crash.

Walker decided to stay in the U. S. and apply for citizenship. Once settled in Nashville, he connected with Chet Atkins, who was working with artist Eddy Arnold. Atkins asked Walker to do orchestral arrangements for Arnold's album My World, which contained the No. 1 single "Make the World Go Away". That record became Walker's first gold. Walker also arranged orchestra scores for concerts and television appearances.

In the late 1960s, Walker got offered the position of musical director for the Johnny Cash Show on ABC. Cash would end every show by shouting, "Good night, Bill Walker!" The show lasted for 58 episodes. Walker continued as music director for other Johnny Cash television specials after the series was canceled, including Cash's Christmas specials.

The Bill Walker Orchestra was also featured on The Statler Brothers Show on TNN, for the show's entire seven-year run. The Statler Brothers Show was the top-rated show on TNN during its entire tenure. Walker also directed the music for three of the Statler Brothers' TV specials.

Walker's other TV credits include Music Hall America, Nashville Remembers Elvis on His Birthday, Ann-Margret...Rhinestone Cowgirl and the Music City News Awards, Country Music Association Awards for 15 years, Perry Como And His Nashville Friends, Nashville Remembers Elvis On His Birthday, the Grand Ole Opry At 50, Lynn Anderson & Tina Turner In Nashville, Ann-Margret’s Rhinestone Cowgirl, Opryland In Russia, That Great American Gospel Sound (with Tennessee Ernie Ford and Della Reese), Conway Twitty: On the Mississippi, The Tenth Anniversary Of The Reopening of Ford’s Theater, The Music City News Cover Awards Show (also for 15 years), A Celebration Of Country Music At Ford’s Theater (a two-hour special for President Jimmy Carter), Crystal Gayle In Sweden and George Burns In Nashville.

He also worked as a producer, with credits including Roy Rogers and Donna Fargo. He also earned gold records for Eddy Arnold's "Make the World Go Away", "Turn The World Around", "Misty Blue" and "What's He Doing in My World"; Bobby Vinton's "Roses Are Red (My Love)" and "My Elusive Dreams"; Roy Clark's "Come Live With Me"; Jim Reeves' "From a Jack to a King"; Sammi Smith's "Help Me Make It Through the Night"; Marty Robbins's "My Woman, My Woman, My Wife"; Johnny Cash 's "Sunday Morning Coming Down"; Bob Dylan's "Copper Kettle" and Nashville Skyline; and Donna Fargo 's "The Happiest Girl In The Whole U.S.A." and "Funny Face".

In the late 1970s, Walker started Con Brio Records with his son, Jeff Walker. The label won Best New Label from Billboard magazine in 1977. Walker handled A&R and production while his son handled operations. Later, in 2007, Jeff Walker founded the digital distribution label GMV Nashville, primarily as a way to re-release the Con Brio titles. Con Brio's roster included Don King, Terri Hollowell, and Dale McBride.

In 2015, Walker was inducted to the Country Music Hall of Fame's Nashville Cat for his contributions to country music.

Walker was married to the singer Jeanine Ogletree. He died in Nashville on May 26, 2022, aged 95.

== See also ==
- Con Brio Records
- GMV Nashville
