= C.O.U.N.T.R.Y. =

"C.O.U.N.T.R.Y." may refer to:

- "C.O.U.N.T.R.Y.", a song on American country music duo LoCash Cowboy's eponymous 2012 album
- "C.O.U.N.T.R.Y.", a song on American country music singer Tyler Farr's 2015 album Suffer in Peace
- "C-O-U-N-T-R-Y", a single from American country music singer Joe Diffie's 1995 album Life's So Funny

== See also ==
- Country
- Country (disambiguation)
- Country music
