= Country Party =

Country Party was the original 17th-century name of what developed into the British Whig Party. It may also refer to:

== Politics ==
- Australian Country Party (1920), now called the National Party of Australia
- Australian Country Party (2004), now called the Australian Federation Party
- Country Party (Britain), opponents of the Court Party and the government, late 17th and early 18th century
- Ultra-Tories, active 1829–32 in Great Britain
- Country Party (New Zealand), active in the 1920s and 1930s
- PNG Country Party, Papua New Guinea
- Country Party (Rhode Island), United States; active in the 1780s
- Wyoming Country Party, United States; see 2012 United States Senate election in Wyoming

== Other ==
- "Country Party" (song), a song by Johnny Lee

== See also ==
- Countryside Party (UK)
- New Country Party, Australia
- United Country Party (disambiguation)
