= Al Witcher =

American football player (born 1936)

No. 88
- Position: Linebacker

Personal information
- Born: September 28, 1936 (age 90); Burnet, Texas, U.S.
- Listed height: 6 ft 1 in (1.85 m)
- Listed weight: 200 lb (91 kg)

Career information
- High school: Lampasas (Lampasas, Texas)
- College: Baylor (1956–1959)
- NFL draft: 1959: 13th round, 152nd overall pick
- AFL draft: 1960

Career history
- Houston Oilers (1960)

Awards and highlights
- AFL champion (1960); First-team All-SWC (1959); Second-team All-SWC (1958)

Career AFL statistics
- Receptions: 4
- Receiving yards: 34
- Touchdowns: 1
- Stats at Pro Football Reference

Thomas Albert Witcher (born September 28, 1936) is an American former professional football player who was a linebacker for one season with the Houston Oilers of the American Football League (AFL). He played college football for the Baylor Bears.

== Early life and college ==
Thomas Albert Witcher was born on September 28, 1936, in Burnet, Texas. He attended Lampasas High School in Lampasas, Texas.

Witcher was a member of the Baylor Bears of Baylor University from 1956 to 1959 and a three-year letterman from 1957 to 1959. He earned Associated Press (AP) second-team All-Southwest Conference (SWC) honors in 1958 and AP first-team All-SWC honors in 1959. He was later inducted into Baylor's athletics hall of fame.

== Professional career ==
Witcher was selected by the Los Angeles Rams in the 13th round, with the 152nd overall pick, of the 1959 NFL draft. He was also selected by the Minneapolis AFL team in the 1960 AFL draft.

Witcher's AFL rights were later traded to the Houston Oilers. He played in fourteen games, starting seven, for the Oilers during the team's inaugural 1960 season, totaling one interception, one sack, and four receptions for 34 yards and one touchdown. He also started for the Oilers in the 1960 AFL Championship Game, a 24–16 victory over the Los Angeles Chargers.

== Personal life ==
Witcher retired from professional football to attend law school. He then became a lawyer in Texas.
