= Lampasas High School =

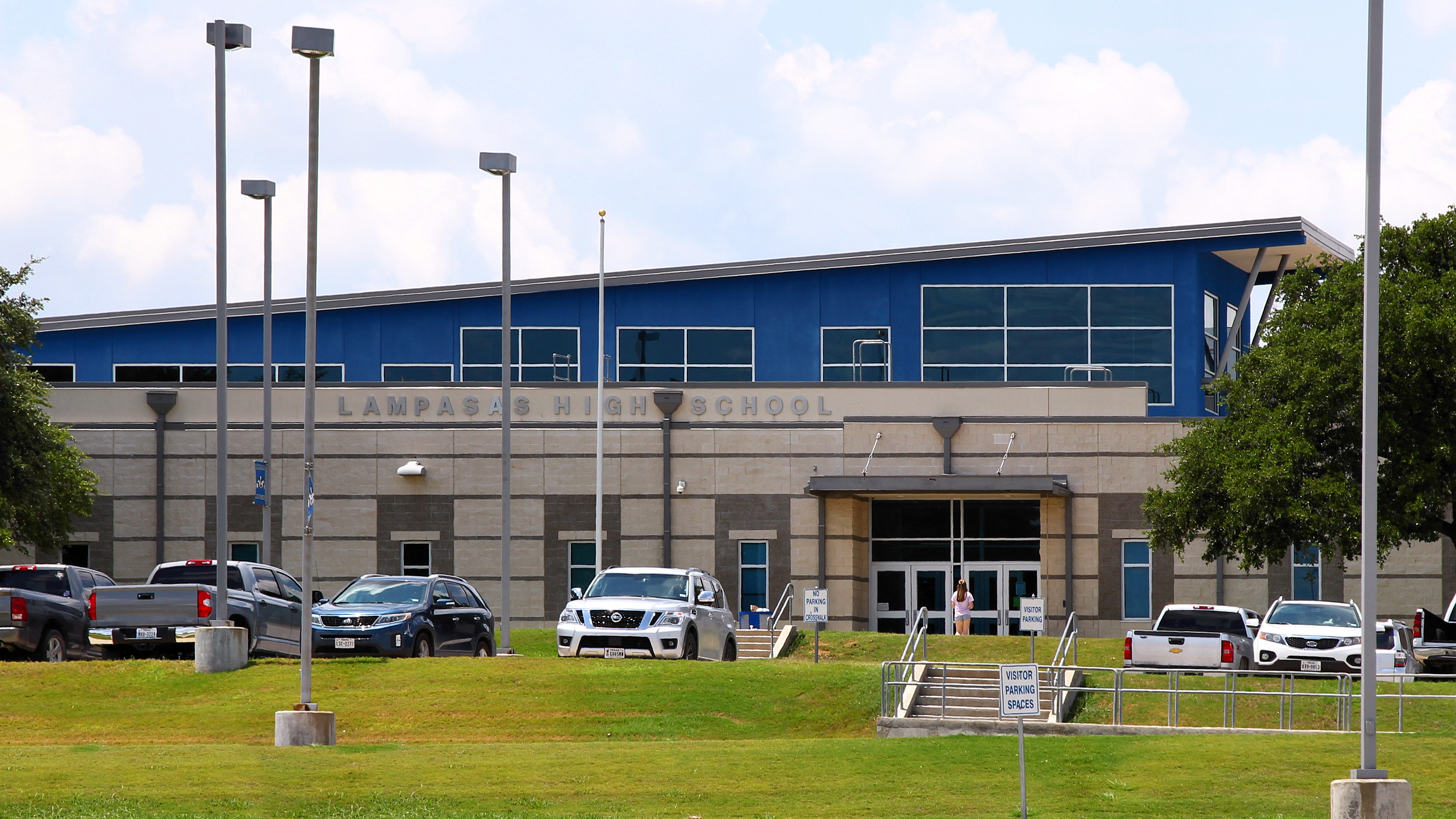

Location
- 2716 South Highway 281; Lampasas, Texas 76550-3142; United States; 31.039348°N 98.186125°W

Information
- School type: Public high school
- School district: Lampasas Independent School District
- Principal: Paul Weinheimer
- Teaching staff: 78.52 (FTE)
- Grades: 9-12
- Enrollment: 1,104 (2023–2024)
- Student to teacher ratio: 14.06
- Colors: Royal Blue & White
- Athletics conference: UIL Class AAAA
- Mascot: Badger
- Yearbook: The Badger
- Website: Lampasas High School

Lampasas High School or LHS is a public high school located in the city of Lampasas, Texas, United States and classified as a 4A school by the University Interscholastic League (UIL). It is a part of the Lampasas Independent School District located in south central Lampasas County. In 2015, the school was rated "Met Standard" by the Texas Education Agency.

== Fine Arts ==
Lampasas High School has found great success in their Fine Arts Department. Students can participate in UIL (One-Act Play), Band, Art, and Dance.

In 2013, the Lampasas Speech and Debate Team received the award of top Speech Team in the state, conference AAA. The members earning points towards the championship were Emily Kleinburg, earning 9 points through her 3rd-place finish in Lincoln Douglas Debate, as well as 8 points through her fourth-place finish in Persuasive Extemporaneous Speaking. Also with Brenden Dimmig, and his second-place finish in Informative Extemporaneous Speaking earning 12 points. Finally, the team of Brenden Dimmig and Tiffani Walthrop, with their second-place finish in the Cross Examination Debate Tournament, earned 16 points.

== Athletics ==
The Lampasas Badgers compete in these sports -

- Baseball
- Basketball
- Cross Country
- Football
- Golf
- Powerlifting
- Soccer
- Softball
- Tennis
- Track and Field
- Volleyball

=== State titles ===
- Girls Golf -
  - 1951(1A), 1952(1A)
- Boys Track -
  - 1976(3A)

==== State Finalist ====
- Girls Golf
  - 2011(3A)
- Tennis
  - 2011(3A)

== Notable alumni ==
- Johnny Lam Jones - Olympic Gold Medalist sprinter and former University of Texas star, and the number two overall selection in the NFL Draft, was a 1976 graduate of Lampasas.
- Keith Null - Former St. Louis Rams Quarterback was a 2003 graduate of Lampasas High School.
- Al Witcher - African American; football player
