= Amber Hayes =

American country music singer-songwriter

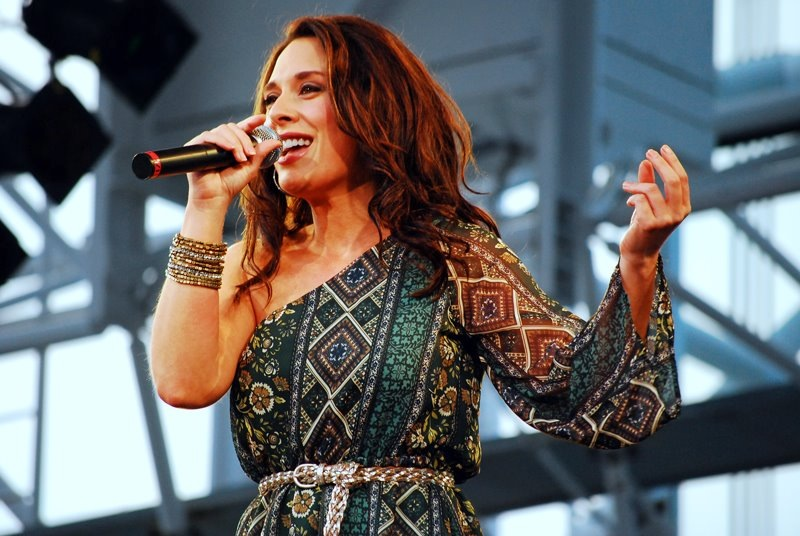
- Hayes in 2013

Background information
- Born: Weleetka, Oklahoma, U.S.
- Genres: Country
- Occupation: Singer-songwriter
- Instrument: Vocals
- Years active: 2009–present
- Labels: GMV Nashville

Amber Hayes is an American country music singer-songwriter. In 2008, she was cast as Kathy Twitty in the Conway Twitty production, Conway Twitty: The Man, The Music, The Legend... She was signed to FUNL Music in 2010 and released her debut album C'mon and video later that year. Also in 2014, Hayes signed with AristoMedia for publicity and GMV Nashville for digital distribution.

"C'mon" was the first of two singles off the album and went to 38 on the Music Row Country Breakout Chart. "Wait" was the second single and was released in February and went to number 35 on the Music Row Country Breakout Chart. It premiered on Yallwire on May 13, 2011.

Hayes' C'mon album release party was held at the Station Inn and was broadcast on WSM 650AM in late 2010.

Much of 2010 and 2011 was devoted to touring with label mate Ty Herndon and included international shows in China, Japan, and Sweden.

In 2012, Hayes' music ("C'mon", "Right As Rain", "Always There For Me") appeared in the major motion picture and soundtrack for Cowgirls 'n Angels, which starred Bailee Madison, James Cromwell, Frankie Faison, among others. In addition to Hayes' music being featured in the movie, she had a minor part in the film, dueting with Lonestar's Richie McDonald during one the scenes.

Also in 2012, Hayes' music "Wait", "C'mon", "Easy on Me" and "Right As Rain" appeared in the CW Network's Hart of Dixie which stars Rachel Bilson and Scott Porter.

On October 22, 2012 Hayes released Any Day Is A Good Day on GMV Nashville and A-OK Entertainment.

In January 2013, Billboard magazine's "The 615" named Hayes an "Artist to Watch" in 2013. Also in early 2013, she signed with noted booking agent Tony Conway of Conway Entertainment Group.

In April 2013, Hayes released single "Any Day Is A Good Day" co-written by Hayes, Bill DiLuigi and JP Williams. Also in 2013, Hayes’ released a lyric video for her single "Any Day Is A Good Day", which was shot and edited by Thomas Newton and illustrated by Christen Cole.

Hayes' song "Right As Rain" is featured in the documentary film Music City USA, which took home the Golden Drover for Best Feature Documentary at the 2014 Trail Dance Film Festival.

Hayes makes an appearance in the 2014 Cowgirls 'n Angels sequel, Cowgirls 'n Angels: Dakota's Summer, for a performance of her rendition of country classic "Cotton Eyed Joe." The track was produced and co-written by Charlie Kelley, and is featured on the Cowgirls 'n Angels: Dakota's Summer soundtrack along with her song “Home.” Later in 2014, Hayes released a music video for "Cotton Eyed Joe.”

In April 2014, Cowgirls 'n Angels: Dakota's Summer premiered at the 2014 Dallas International Film Festival. In the movie, Oscar winner Keith Carradine (Cowboys & Aliens) stars alongside a young, popular cast that includes Haley Ramm (X-Men: The Last Stand), Jade Pettyjohn (An American Girl: McKenna Shoots for the Stars) and Emily Bett Rickards (Arrow).

At the June 2014 CMA Music Festival, Hayes presented Sweet Sunday Singin’ with Amber Hayes and Friends, which was hosted by Philip Gibbons and sponsored by Gigi's Cupcakes and J. Alexander Home.

In November 2014, Hayes released a 5-song EP, titled Running Out of Memories through GMV Nashville/A-OK Entertainment, which features Hayes’ rendition of "Cotton Eyed Joe," a remix of her previously released "Me & Loretta," as well as three additional songs that were produced by Bobby Terry.

== Discography ==
=== Studio albums ===
Title	Album details
C'mon	Release date: August 31, 2010; Label: A-OK Entertainment/GMV Nashville; Format: CD, music download
Any Day Is a Good Day	Release date: October 1, 2012; Label: A-OK Entertainment/GMV Nashville; Format: CD, music download
Running Out Of Memories	Release date: November 11, 2014; Label: A-OK Entertainment/GMV Nashville; Format: CD, music download

=== Singles ===
Year	Single	Album
2010	"C'mon"	C'mon
2011	"Wait"	C'mon
2012	"Any Day Is a Good Day"	Any Day Is a Good Day
2015	"Running Out of Memories"	Running Out of Memories
2015	"A Hero's Heart"	TBD

=== Music videos ===
Year	Video	Director
2010	"C'mon"	Carl Diebold
2011	"Wait"	Steven Goldmann
2013	"Any Day Is A Good Day" Lyric Video	Thomas Newton & Christen Cole
2014	"Cotton Eyed Joe" Lyric Video	Karl Weidmann
2014	"Cotton Eyed Joe" Official	Ben Feingold
