= One in a Million (Johnny Lee song) =

Single by Johnny Lee

from the album Lookin' for Love
- Released: October 6, 1980
- Genre: Country
- Length: 2:48
- Label: Asylum
- Songwriter(s): Chick Rains
- Producer(s): Jim Ed Norman

Johnny Lee singles chronology
"Lookin' for Love" (1980)	"One in a Million" (1980)	"Pickin' Up Strangers" (1981)

"One in a Million" is a song written by Chick Rains, and recorded by American country music artist Johnny Lee. It was released in October 1980 as the second single from the album Lookin' for Love. The song was Lee's second number one on the country chart. The single stayed at number one for two weeks, and also spent a total of thirteen weeks on the country chart.

== Chart performance ==
Chart (1980–1981)	Peak position
US Hot Country Songs (Billboard)	1
US Bubbling Under Hot 100 (Billboard)	2
Canadian RPM Country Tracks	8
