= Pickin' Up Strangers =

Single by Johnny Lee

from the album Lookin' for Love
- B-side: "Never Lay My Lovin' Down"
- Released: January 1981
- Genre: Country
- Length: 2:23
- Label: Full Moon/Asylum
- Songwriter: Byron Hill
- Producer: Jim Ed Norman

Johnny Lee singles chronology
"One in a Million" (1980)	"Pickin' Up Strangers" (1981)	"Prisoner of Hope" (1981)

"Pickin' Up Strangers" is a song written by Byron Hill, and recorded by American country music artist Johnny Lee. It was released in January 1981 and recorded the soundtrack of the feature film Coast to Coast, and was also the third single from Lee's album Lookin' for Love. The song won an ASCAP Award for being among the most performed country songs of 1981.

== Chart performance ==
Chart (1981)	Peak position
US Hot Country Songs (Billboard)	3
Canadian RPM Country Tracks	4
