= Thom Bresh =

US country music guitarist and singer (1948–2022)

- Also known as: Tom Bresh
- Born: Thomas Charles Bresh; February 23, 1948; Hollywood, California, U.S.
- Died: May 23, 2022 (aged 74) Nashville, Tennessee, U.S.
- Genres: Country
- Occupations: Singer, songwriter, actor, stuntman
- Instruments: Vocals, guitar
- Years active: 1951–2022
- Labels: Kapp, Farr, ABC
- Website: Official website

Thomas Charles Bresh (February 23, 1948 – May 23, 2022), sometimes spelled Tom Bresh, was an American country music guitarist and singer. Active from the 1970s, Bresh charted multiple singles on the Billboard Hot Country Songs charts.

== Biography ==
Bresh was born on February 23, 1948, in Hollywood, California, as the son of country singer Merle Travis. As a child, Bresh began acting in films and recording his own music. He also worked as a movie stuntman at the Corriganville Movie Ranch.

In 1963, he was a member of the rock and roll band The Crescents featuring Chiyo when they recorded an instrumental track, "Pink Dominos". Producer Kim Foley issued this as a 45 rpm single with "Breakout" on the B-side. "Pink Dominos" peaked at No. 69 on the Billboard Hot 100 in early 1964.

He then released a solo single about D. B. Cooper which was withdrawn due to controversy over its subject matter.

Starting in 1972, Bresh recorded for Kapp Records. His first charted single, "Home Made Love", made number six on the Hot Country Songs charts in 1976. This was included on an album of the same name for Farr Records. Due to the song's success, Bresh was nominated by the Academy of Country Music as Top New Male Vocalist that year.

Bresh recorded two albums for ABC Records as well: Kicked Back in 1977 and Portrait a year later, both produced by Jimmy Bowen. Cash Box magazine reviewed Kicked Back favorably, saying that Bresh had "[a] perfectly mellow voice and vital tracks with excellent material and interpretation". Record World magazine published a positive review of Portrait, calling the album "versatile" and noting the variety of musical influences. Included on Portrait was a cover of "Smoke! Smoke! Smoke! (That Cigarette)" which featured Bresh performing thirteen different impersonations.

Bresh hosted a weekly television variety show of his own creation, Nashville Swing, was a regular on The Merv Griffin Show and Dinah!, and made a guest appearance on the TNN special A Salute to the Country Greats. As a producer, he has been employed by country legend Jerry Reed, classical guitarist Valerie DuChateau, and Merle Travis. As a videographer, Bresh has shot, produced, and edited projects for Hank Thompson, Lyle Lovett, Brooks & Dunn, George Jones, Tanya Tucker, Merle Haggard and Jerry Reed.

Bresh was diagnosed with esophageal cancer in 2021. He died in Nashville on May 23, 2022, at the age of 74.

== Discography ==
=== Albums ===
Year	Album	Label	Comment
1976	Homemade Love	Farr Records – FL-1000	
1977	Kicked Back	ABC Dot – DO-2084	
1978	Portrait	ABC Records – AB-1055	
?	Bresh and Brody Live!	Double B Ent. 0051	w/ Lane Brody
1993	Son Of A Guitar Pickin' Man	Belle Meade Records – BMCD-193	
?	Next Generation	Belle Meade Records – BMCD-494	
1992, 1993	Live & Pickin'!	Belle Meade Records – BMCD-195, DCM Digital Records – DCM100	
ca 1995	The World's Greatest Guitar Pickin' Entertainer In The World	Legend LR-109	live album, enhanced reissue of BMCD-195, feat. Buster B. Jones
1999	Wires To The Wood	DCM Digital Records – DCM101	
2001	Guts & Steel [Groovemasters vol. 5]	Solid Air Records – SACD2025	w/ Buster B. Jones
2002	Down & Not Too Dirty	Bresh Entertainment?	
2011?	@ Home	?	
ca 2013?	Guitar Boy	?	
2018?	Time	?	

=== Singles ===
Year	Single	US Country	US AC	Album
1976	"Homemade Love"	6	—	Homemade Love
1976	"Sad Country Love Song"	17	37	Homemade Love
1976	"Hey Daisy (Where Have All the Good Times Gone)"	33	—	Homemade Love
1977	"Until I Met You"	57	—	Kicked Back
1977	"That Old Cold Shoulder"	48	—	Kicked Back
1978	"Smoke! Smoke! Smoke! (That Cigarette)"	78	—	Portrait
1978	"Ways of a Woman in Love"	74	—	Portrait
1978	"First Encounter of a Close Kind"	84	—	singles only
1982	"When It Comes to Love" (with Lane Brody)	77	—	singles only
1983	"I'd Love You to Want Me"	—	—	singles only
1983	"Somebody Like You"	—	—	singles only
