= My Baby Don't Slow Dance =

Single by Johnny Lee

from the album Hey Bartender
- B-side: "You've Really Got a Hold on Me"
- Released: September 1983
- Genre: Country
- Length: 2:24
- Label: Warner Bros.
- Songwriter(s): Bill Lamb, Peter Wood
- Producer(s): Jimmy Bowen

Johnny Lee singles chronology
"Hey Bartender" (1983)	"My Baby Don't Slow Dance" (1983)	"The Yellow Rose" (1984)

My Baby Don't Slow Dance is a song written by Bill Lamb and Peter Wood, and recorded by American country music artist Johnny Lee. It was released in September 1983 as the second and final single from the album Hey Bartender. The song reached number 23 on the Billboard Hot Country Singles & Tracks chart and number 13 on the Canadian RPM Country Tracks chart.

== Chart performance ==
Chart (1983–1984)	Peak position
US Hot Country Songs (Billboard)	23
Canadian RPM Country Tracks	13
