= Polity =

Group of people with a collective identity

A polity is a group of people with a collective identity, who are organized by some form of political, institutionalized, social relations and have a capacity to mobilize resources. It is the unit or entity of a political community or body politic.

== Overview ==
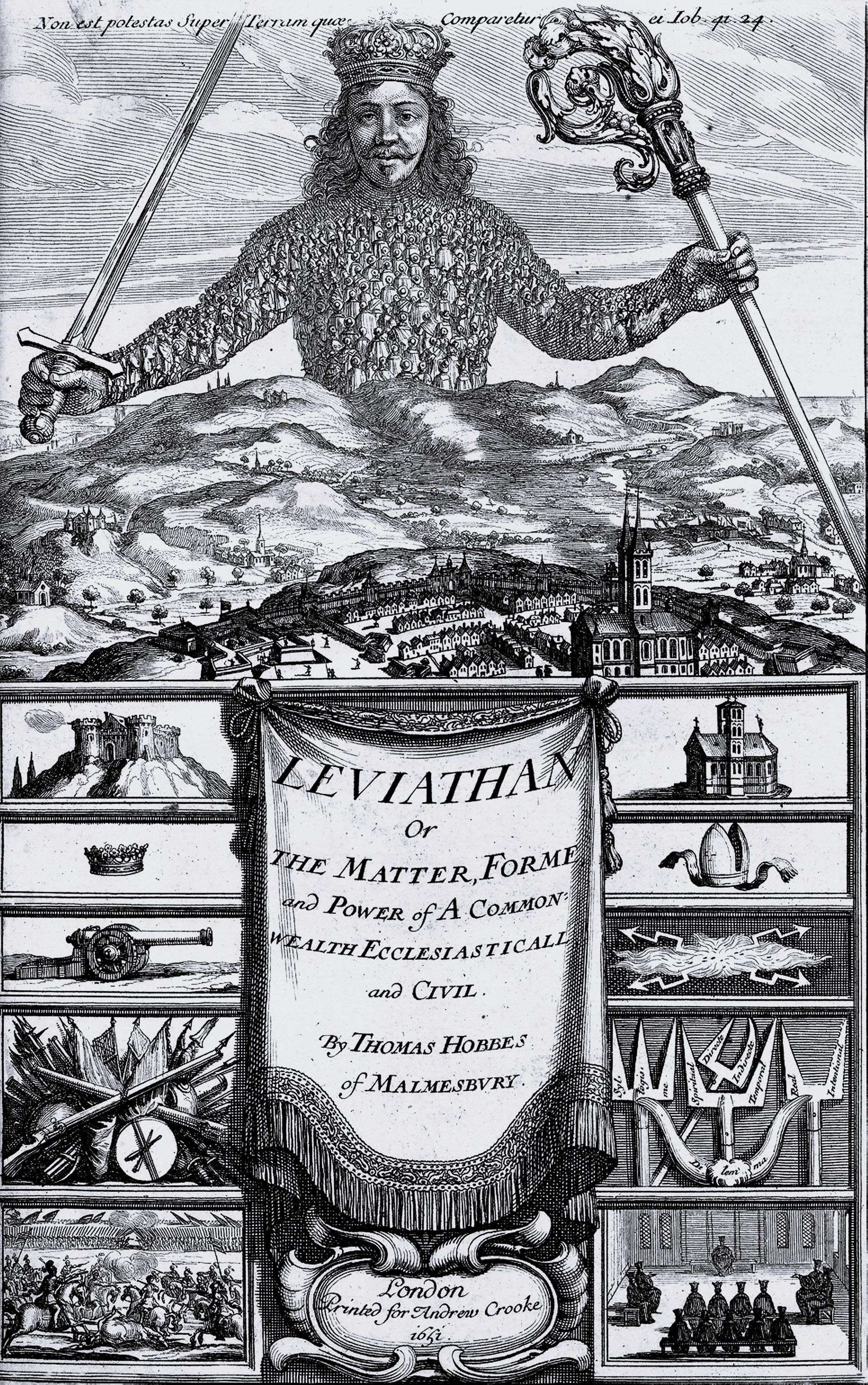
Frontispiece of Leviathan, 1690

In geopolitics, a polity can manifest in different forms such as a province, a nation, a state, an empire, an international organization, a political organization or another identifiable, resource-manipulating organizational structure. A polity, like a state, does not need to be a sovereign unit. The preeminent polities today are Westphalian states and nation-states, commonly referred to as countries. The term country may refer to a variety of types of polity: usually to a sovereign state, but also to a state with limited recognition, a constituent country of a sovereign state, or a dependent territory.

A polity may encapsulate a multitude of organizations. Many of these form (or are involved in) the administrative apparatus of contemporary nation states: such as their subordinate civil, regional, and local government authorities.

Thomas Hobbes was a highly significant figure in the conceptualisation of polities, in particular of states. Hobbes considered notions of the state and the body politic in Leviathan, his most notable work.

== See also ==
- Kokutai
- Nation
- Politeia
- Political system
