= Be There for Me Baby =

Single by Johnny Lee

from the album Bet Your Heart on Me
- B-side: "Finally Fallin'"
- Released: January 18, 1982
- Genre: Country
- Length: 2:26
- Label: Asylum
- Songwriter(s): Tommy Rocco, Charlie Black
- Producer(s): Jim Ed Norman

Johnny Lee singles chronology
| "Bet Your Heart on Me" (1981) | "Be There for Me Baby" (1982) | "When You Fall in Love" (1982) |

"Be There for Me Baby" is a song written by Tommy Rocco and Charlie Black, and recorded by American country music artist Johnny Lee. It was released in January 1982 as the second single from the album Bet Your Heart on Me. The song reached number 10 on the Billboard Hot Country Singles & Tracks chart.

== Chart performance ==
| Chart (1982) | Peak position |
|---|---|
| US Hot Country Songs (Billboard) | 10 |
| Canadian RPM Country Tracks | 5 |
