= Lane Brody =

American singer-songwriter

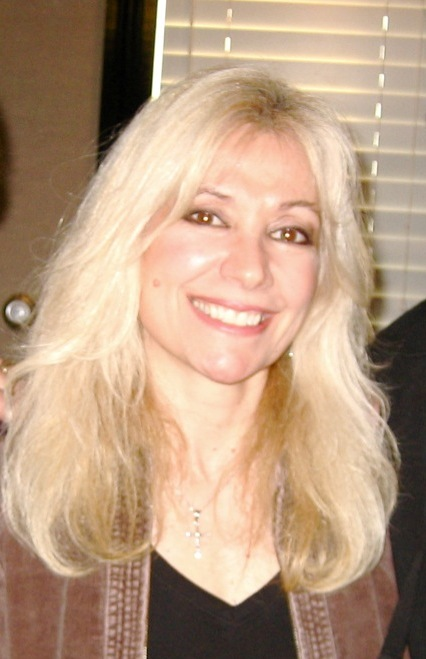
- Brody in 2008

Background information
- Born: Lynn Voorlas; September 24, 1955 (age 70)
- Origin: Oak Park, Illinois, U.S.
- Genres: Country
- Occupations: Recording artist, songwriter
- Instrument: Guitar
- Labels: Liberty; EMI; GMV Nashville
- Website: lanebrody.com

Lynne Connie Voorlas (born September 24, 1955), known professionally as Lane Brody, is an American country music singer-songwriter, active since the early 1980s, best known for her 1984 Billboard-topping country hit "The Yellow Rose" (a duet with country music singer Johnny Lee), and for the Oscar-nominated song "Over You" from the 1983 film Tender Mercies. Besides "The Yellow Rose", Brody has eleven other chart singles on the Billboard country charts.

== Biography ==
Brody was born Lynne Connie (Eleni Constantina) Voorlas on September 24, 1955, in Oak Park, Illinois, but calls Racine, Wisconsin her hometown. She graduated from Horlick High School in 1969. She started her music career by singing commercial jingles for many popular TV and radio commercials. In 1982, she co-wrote Anne Murray's song "The Hottest Night of the Year" with fellow songwriters Thomas Campbell and Kerry Chatter. Soon afterward, she began charting her own singles, including the No. 15 country hit "Over You", which was featured in the film Tender Mercies and received a nomination for Best Original Song at 56th Academy Awards in 1984. Brody and Johnny Lee wrote lyrics to and recorded the theme music for the 1983–1984 NBC television show, The Yellow Rose. The theme song of the same name became a No. 1 hit on the U.S. country singles chart on April 21, 1984.

In 1984, Brody was the voice of the XIV Olympics singing for Beatrice foods. During that year Brody also signed with GRT Records. Brody made her singular appearance on the PBS music television program Austin City Limits, where she sang duets with Thom Bresh, with whom she had been on tour through 1987. Lane has appeared on numerous shows such as NBC's Today, Crook & Chase and Taxi.

Lane was inducted to the Country Music Hall of Fame's Walkway of Stars in 1996.

Her song "All The Unsung Heroes" is the theme behind a documentary on the Vietnam War Memorial documentary. Brody is married to Nashville musician Eddie Bayers.

== Discography ==
=== Albums ===
Year	Album	US Country	Label
1985	Lane Brody	55	EMI
2001	Familiar Places	—	Records Records
2002	Pieces of Life	—	Scream
2010	On the Wings of Songs	—	GMV Nashville

=== Singles ===
Year	Title	Peak chart positions		Album
Year	Title	US Country	CAN Country	Album
1977	"You're Gonna Make Love to Me" (as Lynn Nilles)	93	—	—N/a
1982	"He's Taken"	60	—	—N/a
1982	"More Nights"	61	—	Tough Enough (soundtrack)
1982	"When It Comes to Love" (with Thom Bresh)	77	—	—N/a
1983	"Over You"	15	—	Tender Mercies (soundtrack)
1983	"It's Another Silent Night"	60	—	—N/a
1984	"Hanging On"	59	—	—N/a
1984	"Alibis"	81	—	—N/a
1985	"He Burns Me Up"	29	51	Lane Brody
1985	"Baby's Eyes"	51	39	Lane Brody
2002	"Plenty More Love"	—	—	Pieces of Life
2005	"Your Wildest Dreams"	—	—	On the Wings of Songs
2006	"That's Where Love Comes In"	—	—	On the Wings of Songs
2008	"Found in Each Other"	—	—	On the Wings of Songs
2010	"Thanks for What You Did"	—	—	On the Wings of Songs
2011	"Flame's Turned Blue"	—	—	On the Wings of Songs

=== Guest singles ===
Year	Title	Artist	Peak chart positions		Album
Year	Title	Artist	US Country	CAN Country	Album
1984	"The Yellow Rose"	Johnny Lee	1	1	'Til the Bars Burn Down
1986	"I Could Get Used to This"	Johnny Lee	50	—	—N/a

=== Music videos ===
Year	Video	Director
1984	"The Yellow Rose of Texas"	
2009	"That's Where Love Comes In"	
2010	"Thanks for What You Did"	Ross Wood
2011	"Flame's Turned Blue"	Ross Wood
2015	"Even More"	
