= Hey Bartender =

Single by Johnny Lee

from the album Hey Bartender
- Released: June 1983
- Genre: Country
- Length: 2:44
- Label: Full Moon
- Songwriter(s): Dossie Terry
- Producer(s): Jimmy Bowen

Johnny Lee singles chronology
"Sounds Like Love" (1983)	"Hey Bartender" (1983)	"My Baby Don't Slow Dance" (1983)

"Hey Bartender" is a song written by Dossie Terry, copyright filing EU389235 dated 10 March 1955 and renewed RE180048 on 11 March 1983.

It was first recorded by Floyd Dixon in 1955 on Cat Records 114; the label credits "Terry" as composer. A cover by "Blue Boo Boo" Blazer & Little Archie Taylor with Geechie Hicks & His Creole Combo was released as a B-side in 1959 and it was credited to "Blazer-Williams". A cover by Laurel Aitken in 1961 titled "Bar Tender" made the song a success, though the Blue Beat 45 label credited "L. Aitken" as composer. It was subsequently covered and recorded live by The Blues Brothers in 1978, although the composer credit on the Atlantic Records release indicated "Floyd Dickson".

It was also recorded by American country music artist Johnny Lee, though his release also credited "Floyd Dickson" as composer. It was released in June 1983 as the first single and title track from his album, Hey Bartender. The song reached number 2 on the Billboard Hot Country Singles chart and number 1 on the RPM Country Tracks chart in Canada.

== Charts ==
=== Weekly charts ===
Chart (1983)	Peak position
US Hot Country Songs (Billboard)	2
Canadian RPM Country Tracks	1

=== Year-end charts ===
Chart (1983)	Position
US Hot Country Songs (Billboard)	14
