= Bet Your Heart on Me =

- Dutch release picture sleeve

Single by Johnny Lee

from the album Bet Your Heart on Me
- B-side: "Highways Run On Forever"
- Released: September 28, 1981
- Genre: Country
- Length: 2:47
- Label: Full Moon/Asylum
- Songwriter: Jim McBride
- Producer: Jim Ed Norman

Johnny Lee singles chronology
"Rode Hard and Put Up Wet" (1981)	"Bet Your Heart on Me" (1981)	"Be There for Me Baby" (1982)

"Bet Your Heart on Me" is a song written by Jim McBride and recorded by American country music artist Johnny Lee. It was released in September 1981 as the lead single and title track from the album Bet Your Heart on Me. The song was Lee's third number one on the Country chart. The single stayed at number one for one week and spent a total of ten weeks on the chart.

== Charts ==
Chart (1981)	Peak position
US Hot Country Songs (Billboard)	1
US Billboard Hot 100	54
Canadian RPM Country Tracks	5
