= When You Fall in Love =

Single by Johnny Lee

from the album Bet Your Heart on Me
- B-side: "Crossfire"
- Released: May 10, 1982
- Genre: Country
- Length: 2:47
- Label: Asylum
- Songwriter(s): Steve Earle; John Scott Sherrill
- Producer(s): Jim Ed Norman

Johnny Lee singles chronology
"Be There for Me Baby" (1982)	"When You Fall in Love" (1982)	"Cherokee Fiddle" (1982)

"When You Fall in Love" is a song written by Steve Earle and John Scott Sherrill, and recorded by American country music artist Johnny Lee. It was released in May 1982 as the third and final single from the album Bet Your Heart on Me. The song reached No. 14 on the Billboard Hot Country Singles & Tracks chart and peaked at No. 46 on the Canadian RPM Country Tracks chart.

== Chart performance ==
Chart (1982)	Peak position
US Hot Country Songs (Billboard)	14
Canadian RPM Country Tracks	46
