= Lam Jones =

American football player and sprinter (1958–2019)

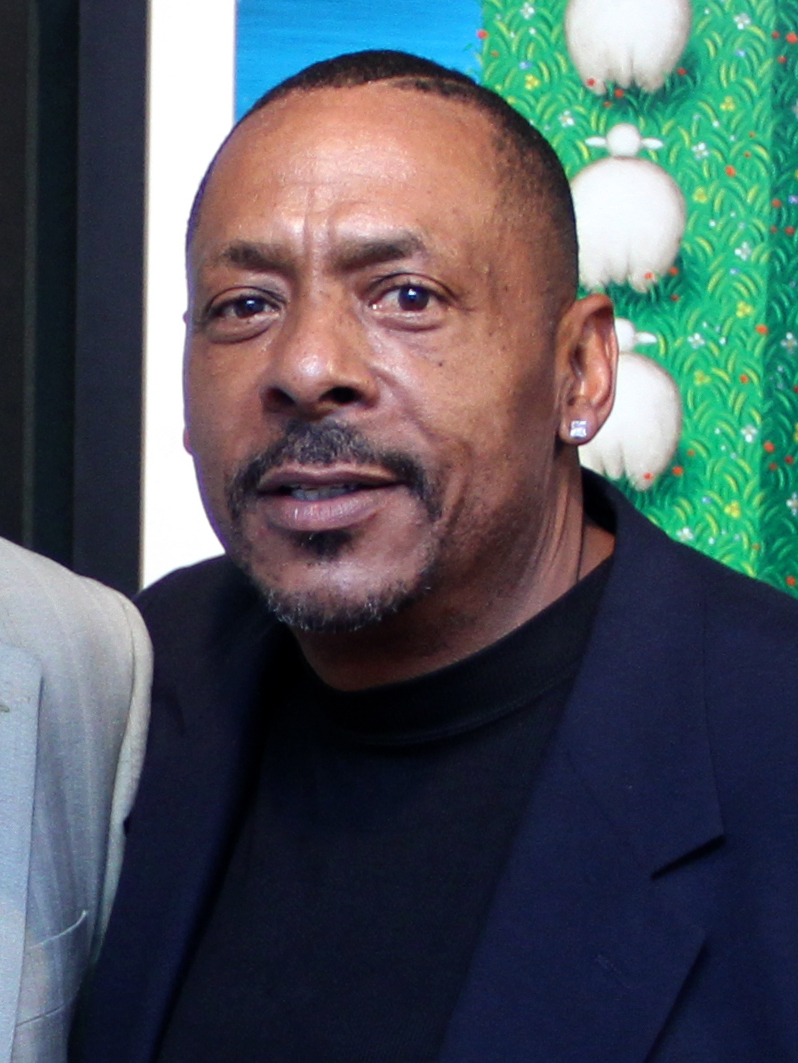
- Jones in 2011

No. 80
- Position: Wide receiver

Personal information
- Born: April 4, 1958; Lawton, Oklahoma, U.S.
- Died: March 15, 2019 (aged 60); Round Rock, Texas, U.S.
- Listed height: 5 ft 11 in (1.80 m)
- Listed weight: 190 lb (86 kg)

Career information
- High school: Lampasas (Lampasas, Texas)
- College: Texas
- NFL draft: 1980: 1st round, 2nd overall pick

Career history
- New York Jets (1980–1986); San Francisco 49ers (1987)*; Dallas Cowboys (1987)
- * Offseason or practice squad member only

Awards and highlights
- 2 × All-SWC (1978, 1979); TSN All-American (1979); 1978 Sun Bowl MVP and champion

Career NFL statistics
- Receptions: 138
- Receiving yards: 2,322
- Receiving touchdowns: 13
- Stats at Pro Football Reference

Medal record

Men's athletics

Representing the United States

Olympic Games
Gold medal – first place	1976 Montreal	4 × 100 metres relay

John Wesley "Lam" Jones (April 4, 1958 – March 15, 2019) was an American athlete who won a gold medal in the 4 × 100 meter relay at the 1976 Summer Olympics in Montreal and played professional football in the National Football League (NFL) as a wide receiver for the New York Jets and Dallas Cowboys. Prior to that, he played college football and ran track at the University of Texas.

== Early life ==
Jones attended Lampasas High School. In football, he became a regular starter at running back in a wishbone offense as a junior. He posted 9 carries for 197 yards (21.9-yard avg.) and 4 touchdowns against Fredericksburg High School. He had 12 carries for 154 yards (12.8-yard avg.) and 4 touchdowns against Llano High School. He finished the season with 1,330 rushing yards, an 11.6-yard average, 159 scored points and was named second-team Class AAA All-state.

As a senior, he tallied 257 yards and 4 touchdowns against Gainesville High School and was named All-state. He scored 45 touchdowns in 2 seasons.

In track as a junior, he was the state champion in the 440-yard dash with a time of 47.6 seconds.

He is considered legendary in Texas high school sports history for his performance in the mile relay at the 1976 U.I.L. State Track and Field Meet. Running anchor for Class 3A Lampasas High School, Jones took the baton in last place, reportedly 40 to 60 yards behind the leaders, and passed the entire field for victory. The run has taken on near-mythical status among those who saw it — or claim to have seen it. In 2015, CBS affiliate KEYE broadcast a segment on the existence of a film of the legendary event including Jones' reaction when he learned of it.

== 1976 Olympics ==
Before enrolling at the University of Texas, at the age of 18, Jones qualified for the 4 × 100 metres relay, becoming the youngest athlete from Texas to earn a berth on the U.S. Olympic track and field team. At the 1976 Summer Olympics in Montreal, he won a gold medal running the second leg of the 4 × 100 m team with a time of 38.33 seconds. Jones also replaced an injured Houston McTear in the 100 meters, finished sixth, and returned home as a national celebrity.

== College career ==
Jones accepted a football scholarship from the University of Texas to play under head coach Darrell Royal. In order to differentiate between two players named Johnny Jones on the team, Royal gave them nicknames based on their hometowns — Johnny "Lam" Jones from Lampasas, Texas, and Johnny "Ham" Jones from Hamlin, Texas.

As a freshman running back, Jones posted 118 carries for 624 yards (second on the team to Earl Campbell) with a 5.3-yard average and five touchdowns, and three receptions for 79 yards (third on the team). As a sophomore, new head coach Fred Akers changed the offense and Jones was moved to wide receiver. He led the team with 21 receptions for 543 yards (25.9-yard average) with seven touchdowns, and nine carries for 30 yards (3.3-yard average).

As a junior, Jones led the team with 25 receptions for 446 yards (17.8-yard average) with five touchdowns, and 15 carries for 128 yards (8.5-yard average) with one rushing touchdown. As a senior, he led the team with 36 receptions for 535 yards (14.9-yard average) with two touchdowns, and 14 carries for 68 yards (4.9-yard average).

Jones played wide receiver in run oriented offenses, usually being double-teamed and some times triple-teamed by opposing defenses. In his football career, he averaged 28 receptions per season and 18.9-yards per catch with 14 touchdowns. He ranks 10th on the school's all-time all-purpose yardage list (3,042). He also is one of only three players in Longhorn history to rush for 100 yards in a game and also have a 100-yard receiving game.

=== College statistics ===
Legend
	Led the SWC
	SWC record
	Led the NCAA
	NCAA record
**Bold**	Career high

College receiving and rushing statistics*
Season	School	Games	Rec	Yds	Avg	TD	Att	Yds	Avg	TD
Team		Receiving					Rushing			
1976	Texas	10	3	79	**26.3**	0	**118**	**624**	5.3	**5**
1977	Texas	**11**	21	**543**	25.9	**7**	9	30	3.3	0
1978	Texas	**11**	25	446	17.8	5	15	128	**8.5**	1
1979	Texas	**11**	**36**	535	14.9	2	14	68	4.9	0
Career		43	85	1,603	18.9	14	156	850	5.4	6

* Includes bowl games.

=== Track ===
In his freshman track season, Jones won the 100 metres in 9.85 seconds, which would have been a world record if it hadn't been hand-timed. When converted into automatic timing (10.14 seconds) it ranked as the fastest 100 metres in school history. His times of 9.21 seconds for the 100-yard dash and 20.14 seconds for 220-yard dash set records for Memorial Stadium. He also won four events (100, 220, 440 relay and mile relay) at the Southwest Conference meet. At the NCAA championships, Jones completed a grueling 16-month season by finishing second in the 100 metres with 10.27 seconds and seventh in the 200 metres in 20.85 seconds, with track observers noting he looked worn out.

As a sophomore in track, football injuries began to impact his performances. He ran a hand-timed 10.1 seconds in the 100 metres. He won his first-round heat at the NCAA championships in 10.14 seconds, but he failed to qualify for the NCAA final.

In 1994, he was inducted into the Texas Athletics Hall of Honor. He is considered to be one of the greatest athletes in school history.

== Professional career ==
=== New York Jets ===
In the 1980 NFL draft, the New York Jets were targeting offensive tackle Anthony Muñoz with the second overall pick they obtained from the San Francisco 49ers, but settled for Jones after their team physician recommended not to take Munoz, who failed a physical exam because he had undergone reconstructive knee surgery. The selection was acquired by trading two 1980 first round draft picks (#13-Earl Cooper and #20-Jim Stuckey). Jones was ranked as the best wide receiver in the draft.

The $2.1 million contract he received (equivalent to $8,200,000 in 2025) was the first in the NFL worth over a million dollars. There were reports in the media that the actual contract numbers may have been lower, which included a $250,000 signing bonus, plus a $200,000 loan, and a $300,000 deferred bonus, for a total package of $1.4 million.

As a rookie, he started 13 games, making 25 receptions for 482 yards (19.3-yard avg.) and 3 touchdowns. Since Jones was a world-class sprinter with elite speed, he could beat any coverage, but had trouble catching the football. He was viewed more as an athlete than a football player.

In 1981, he was a backup behind Derrick Gaffney, starting only 3 out of 15 games, while collecting 20 receptions for 342 yards (17.1-yard avg.) and 3 touchdowns.

In 1982, the season was reduced from a 16-game schedule to 9 contests because of the players' strike. He started 7 out of 8 games, finishing with 18 receptions for 294 yards (16.3-yard avg.) and 2 touchdowns.

In 1983, he had his best season with 7 starts out of 14 games, along with 43 receptions for 734 yards (17.1-yard avg.) and 4 touchdowns. He caught 31 of his career-high 43 passes in the final 8 contests.

In 1984, he was placed on the injured reserve list on August 28, spending 11 weeks there with a broken collarbone he suffered in the first preseason game against the Cincinnati Bengals. He was activated on October 26, starting 8 out of 8 games, but was platooned with Gaffney communicating plays from the sideline to quarterback Ken O'Brien. He made 32 receptions for 470 yards (14.7-yard avg.) and one touchdown.

In 1985, he re-injured his right index finger during a practice and was lost for the year after being placed on the injured reserve list on August 15. In 1986, he sat out the season with a hamstring injury after being placed on the injured reserve list on August 19.

On July 23, 1987, he was traded to the San Francisco 49ers in exchange for a 1988 fifth round draft pick (#131-Dennis Price). He left after playing in 61 games (37 starts), recording 138 receptions for 2,322 yards and 13 touchdowns. During his career, he was considered a first round disappointment, criticized for his inconsistency and inability to make catches across the middle of the field.

=== San Francisco 49ers ===
In 1987, the San Francisco 49ers acquired Jones to try him at both split end and flanker, looking to replace Dwight Clark and find a receiver to play alongside Jerry Rice. He was released on August 18.

=== Dallas Cowboys ===
On August 25, 1987, he was signed as a free agent by the Dallas Cowboys, who were experiencing multiple injuries in the receiving corps.

After the players went on strike in the third week of the 1987 season, those contests were canceled (reducing the 16-game season to 15) and the NFL decided that the games going forward would be played using replacement players. He crossed the picket line off the injured reserve to be a part of the Dallas replacement team that was given the mock name "Rhinestone Cowboys" by the media. On October 21, he was released after the strike ended. He didn't appear in any game or record any stat during his time with the team.

== NFL career statistics ==
Legend
**Bold**	Career high

=== Regular season ===
Year	Team	Games		Receiving				
Year	Team	GP	GS	Rec	Yds	Avg	Lng	TD
1980	NYJ	**16**	**13**	25	482	**19.3**	**55**	3
1981	NYJ	15	3	20	342	17.1	47	3
1982	NYJ	8	6	18	294	16.3	51	2
1983	NYJ	14	6	**43**	**734**	17.1	50	**4**
1984	NYJ	8	8	32	470	14.7	37	1
		61	36	138	2,322	16.8	55	13

=== Playoffs ===
Year	Team	Games		Receiving				
Year	Team	GP	GS	Rec	Yds	Avg	Lng	TD
1982	NYJ	3	2	7	109	15.6	38	0
		3	2	7	109	15.6	38	0

== Personal life ==
After his football career, Jones battled drug and alcohol addiction. Jones never had a drink of alcohol until his time in college. A hazing incident as an NFL rookie was an omen of things to come when veterans took him out drinking. The group started downing shots. Unbeknownst to Jones, the vets were drinking soft drinks while pouring him liquor. His troubles with drugs continued after his NFL career until a sexual molestation incident caused him to go to rehab. He recovered and went on to speak about addiction to high school athletes to help them avoid the same problems.

Jones became a motivational speaker for high school athletes, sharing his story as part of his message. He donated part of his speaking fees to the Texas Special Olympics, to which he also donated his Olympic medal in the late 1970s.

In 2005, Jones was diagnosed with myeloma, a cancer that affects bone marrow throughout the body. He died of myeloma March 15, 2019.

== Legacy ==
In 2008, he was inducted into the Texas High School Football Hall of Fame. In 2013, he was inducted into the Texas Track and Field Coaches Hall of Fame.

== See also ==
- List of Texas Longhorns football All-Americans
- List of New York Jets first-round draft picks
