= Prisoner of Hope =

Single by Johnny Lee

from the album Lookin' for Love
- Released: May 25, 1981
- Genre: Country
- Length: 3:11
- Label: Asylum
- Songwriter(s): Sterling Whipple, Gerald Metcalf
- Producer(s): Jim Ed Norman

Johnny Lee singles chronology
"Pickin' Up Strangers" (1981)	"Prisoner of Hope" (1981)	"Rode Hard and Put Up Wet" (1981)

"Prisoner of Hope" is a song written by Sterling Whipple and Gerald Metcalf, and recorded by American country music artist Johnny Lee. It was released in May 1981 as the fourth single from the album Lookin for Love. The song reached number 3 on the Billboard Hot Country Singles & Tracks chart.

== Chart performance ==
Chart (1981)	Peak position
US Hot Country Songs (Billboard)	3
Canadian RPM Country Tracks	4
