= Con Brio Records =

American record label

- Founded: 1976
- Founder: Bill Walker and Jeff Walker
- Genre: Country
- Country of origin: United States
- Location: Nashville, Tennessee
- Official website: http://www.gmvnashville.com

Con Brio Records was a record label active from 1975 to 1979 based in Nashville, Tennessee. Jeff Walker was co-founder and President of the label with his father Bill Walker. It was named Billboard Magazine's "Best New Country Label of the Year" in 1977. The main focus of the label was Country music. According to GMV Nashville, record producer Bill Walker was the arranger and producer in the late 1970s. Walker is well known for his role as musical director of the Johnny Cash television show (1969–1971), the Statler Brothers show on TNN (Nashville Network), and the CMA awards show from the 1970s through the early 1990s. Biff Collie and Johnny K. Covell were the radio promotions staff. The record label was dormant for many years until Jeff Walker of AristoMedia in 2007 released some of the artists' albums digitally on selective online outlets. The new label was called GMV Nashville.

== Artists ==
Reg Lindsay
Dale McBride
Terri Hollowell
Don King
Debbie Grebel
Jan Howard
Scott Summer
Lori Parker
Chester Lester
Sheila Tilton
Jim Jordan
