= Stanley Walker (editor) =

Stanley Walker (October 21, 1898 – November 25, 1962) was an editor of the New York Herald Tribune in the first half of the 20th century.

According to a roadside memorial at the site of his birth near Lampasas, Texas, Walker began his career in Austin and Dallas. He served as city editor of the Herald-Tribune, and also on the staff of the Philadelphia Ledger. Among his books was The Night Club Era. He spent his last years in the Lampasas area.

== Early life ==
Earl Stanley Walker was born to Walter Ferrell Walker (1875–1958), a one-time teacher turned farmer, and his wife Cora Jane Walker, née Stanley (1877–1946). The first of five sons, he grew up working on the family farm, later attending Lampasas High School where he was a member of the debate team. After graduating in 1915 he attended the University of Texas, pledging Sigma Nu fraternity. Walker interned on the Austin American newspaper until he left the university in 1918 to work full time on the Dallas News.

== Newspaper career ==
By 1919 Walker had left Dallas for New York City where he started as a beat reporter on a city paper. He earned his own byline with The Sun and New York Herald a year later, writing Sunday features. Walker married his college sweetheart Mary Louise Sandefer in January 1923; the couple had two children.

Besides working on the editorial staff of his newspaper, Walker wrote book reviews for the New York Times and freelance articles for other publications. One such essay, "The Fundamentalist Pope" for H.L. Mencken's American Mercury drew the ire of local clergy. Walker was also rumored to write "Wild West" fiction under a nom de plume.

Walker was appointed night editor of the New York Herald (later known as the Herald Tribune) in 1926. Two years later he became city editor, a position he held until 1934. He then left the Herald Tribune for short stints at the Daily Mirror, The New Yorker and the New York Woman, returning in 1937 to again hold the position of editor for another two years.

== Books ==
While still editor at the Herald Tribune, his first book, The Night Club Era, was published in 1933. A look at New York City's colorful nightlife in the Speakeasy age, it proved to be his most popular book. A year later he wrote another, this time about his own profession.

City Editor was published just as Walker left the Herald Tribune for the Daily Mirror. Its purpose, according to the author, was to describe the contemporary journalism scene in America, but it also gave the historical background of then-current newspaper trends, including the dawn of the tabloid age in the early 1920s and the ongoing consolidation of many local papers into a few daily giants. It described organizations that serviced newspapers such as the AP and UPI, and smaller local associations now lost to journalistic memory that covered the courthouses and port of New York. The book covered the perils of libel suits, the division of labor between reporters and re-write men, female journalists, the descent of good newspapermen into press agents, the role of photography and photographers, the birth of radio news, and the newly founded schools of journalism with their graduates "pestering city editors for jobs that do not exist".

Reviews were mildly enthusiastic, though one commentary decried Walker's provincialism centered on New York City and a tendency for name-dropping contemporaries. His stated intention to survey the newspaper scene didn't impress another reviewer who described the book instead as a survey of the author's prejudices hammered out as fast as a typewriter can go. One passage that escaped contemporary reviewer's notice concerned the future of newspapers in the radio age when television still existed only in the laboratory.

Some day... some sort of television device will bring a complete newspaper to the customer over the wire.

His third book, Mrs. Astor's Horse, published in 1935, was his last for nearly a decade. A return to the breezy anecdotal style of his first book, it recounted unusual personalities who made the news for a variety of bizarre and sometimes criminal circumstances.

== Later life ==
Walker finished his editorial career at the Philadelphia Evening Public Ledger in 1940. From then on he wrote freelance for magazines and newspapers. His first wife died in 1944, and he remarried two years later to a newspaperwoman named Ruth Alden Howell. He moved back to his hometown of Lampasas, Texas, in 1956, where he published two more books and was a frequent contributor to Texas newspapers.

On November 25, 1962, his body was found lying in a cabin he frequently used for writing; a shotgun lay nearby. The coroner's verdict ruled the death was "self-inflicted". His obituary noted rumors of ill-health and a needed operation were current just before his passing.

== "A good newspaperman" ==
Walker may be best known to modern audiences for his description of the ideal newspaper journalist:

What makes a good newspaperman? The answer is easy. He knows everything. He is aware not only of what goes on in the world today, but his brain is a repository of the accumulated wisdom of the ages.

He is not only handsome, but he has the physical strength which enables him to perform great feats of energy. He can go for nights on end without sleep. He dresses well and talks with charm. Men admire him; women adore him; tycoons and statesmen are willing to share their secrets with him.

He hates lies, meanness and sham but keeps his temper. He is loyal to his paper and to what he looks upon as his profession; whether it is a profession or merely a craft, he resents attempts to debase it.

When he dies, a lot of people are sorry, and some of them remember him for several days.

== Bibliography ==
- The Night Club Era, 1933, ISBN 978-0-8018-6291-5
- City Editor, 1934, ISBN 978-0-8018-6292-2
- Mrs. Astor's Horse, 1935, ISBN 978-1-4067-3888-9
- Dewey: An American of This Century, 1944, ISBN 978-1-4179-8819-8
- Journey toward the Sunlight: a Story of the Dominican Republic and Its People, 1947
- Home to Texas, 1956, Harper, New York
- Texas, 1962, Viking Press, ISBN 978-0-670-69749-6
