= Save the Last Chance =

Single by Johnny Lee

from the album Keep Me Hangin' On
- B-side: "It Ain't the Leaving"
- Released: April 29, 1985
- Genre: Country
- Length: 3:22
- Label: Warner Bros.
- Songwriter(s): Walt Aldridge; Robert Byrne
- Producer(s): Bud Logan, Rick McCollister

Johnny Lee singles chronology
"Rollin' Lonely" (1984)	"Save the Last Chance" (1985)	"They Never Had to Get Over You" (1985)

Save the Last Chance is a song written by Walt Aldridge and Robert Byrne, and recorded by American country music artist Johnny Lee. It was released in April 1985 as the lead single from the album Keep Me Hangin' On. The song reached number 12 on the Billboard Hot Country Singles & Tracks chart and number 12 on the Canadian RPM Country Tracks chart.

== Chart performance ==
Chart (1985)	Peak position
US Hot Country Songs (Billboard)	12
Canadian RPM Country Tracks	12
