= Keith Null =

American football player (born 1985)

No. 9
- Position: Quarterback

Personal information
- Born: September 24, 1985 (age 41); Lampasas, Texas, U.S.
- Listed height: 6 ft 4 in (1.93 m)
- Listed weight: 222 lb (101 kg)

Career information
- High school: Lampasas
- College: West Texas A&M
- NFL draft: 2009: 6th round, 196th overall pick

Career history
- St. Louis Rams (2009); Jacksonville Jaguars (2010)*; Carolina Panthers (2010)
- * Offseason or practice squad member only

Awards and highlights
- 2× All-Lone Star Conference (2007, 2008)

Career NFL statistics
- Passing attempts: 119
- Passing completions: 73
- Completion percentage: 61.3%
- TD–INT: 3–9
- Passing yards: 566
- Passer rating: 49.9
- Stats at Pro Football Reference

Keith Aaron Null (born September 24, 1985) is an American former professional football player who was a quarterback in the National Football League (NFL). He played college football for the West Texas A&M Buffaloes and was selected by the St. Louis Rams in the sixth round of the 2009 NFL draft. Null was also a member of the Jacksonville Jaguars and Carolina Panthers.

== College career ==
Null started in two seasons at West Texas A&M University, throwing for over 9,000 yards in his two seasons as a starter for the Buffaloes. He was awarded all-conference honors as a junior and senior. As a junior, Null threw for 4,134 yards with 41 touchdowns and 14 interceptions, including a 498-yard, six-touchdown outburst against Washburn. After settling in as a junior, Null exploded for one of the most prolific passing seasons at any collegiate level as a senior. He finished the season with 5,097 yards and 48 touchdowns with 15 interceptions.

== Professional career ==
=== St. Louis Rams ===
Null was selected by the St. Louis Rams in the sixth round of the 2009 NFL draft. In week 14, he made his first professional start, filling in for the injured Marc Bulger and Kyle Boller.

In his first regular season start, he completed 27-of-43 passes and threw for one touchdown and five interceptions in a 47–7 loss to the Tennessee Titans. He was the first quarterback to throw five interceptions in their career debut since 1950. Null was cut by the St. Louis Rams before the 2010 regular season campaign began.

=== Jacksonville Jaguars ===
Null was signed to the Jacksonville Jaguars' practice squad on September 27, 2010. He was released on September 30.

=== Carolina Panthers ===
Null joined the Carolina Panthers' practice squad on November 23, 2010. He was called up to the active roster December 3 following a season-ending injury to Tony Pike.

=== Statistics ===
Year	Team	GP	GS	Passing								Rushing			
Year	Team	GP	GS	Cmp	Att	Pct	Yds	Y/A	TD	Int	Rtg	Att	Yds	Avg	TD
2009	STL	4	4	73	119	61.3	566	4.8	3	9	49.9	5	6	1.2	0

== Personal life ==
Null is currently the Campus Pastor at Renew Life Church in Lubbock, Texas where he lives with his wife and three children. In 2014, he began to coach football to area kids at the Keith Null Quarterback and Receiver Mini Camp.
