= GMV Nashville =

Record label

- Founded: 2007
- Founder: Jeff Walker
- Genre: Country
- Country of origin: United States
- Location: Nashville, Tennessee
- Official website: www.gmvnashville.com

GMV Nashville is a digital record label based in Nashville, Tennessee, founded by Jeff Walker in 2007.

== History ==
Walker founded the label primarily to release digital versions of classic releases from Con Brio Records, which was founded by Walker and his father, Bill Walker. Con Brio Records was active from 1975 to 1979 and won Billboard Magazine's "Best New Label Of The Year" in 1977.

GMV Nashville's first releases included out-of-print material from Con Brio artists Terri Hollowell, Dale McBride, Lori Parker, and Don King. It later expanded its catalog to include contemporary artists such as Lane Brody, Maggie Sajak, Exile, Amber Hayes special releases from the Charlie Daniels Band, Toy Caldwell's only solo album, and compilations such as the This Is My America collection.

== Artists ==
- Adam Gregory
- Amber Hayes
- Bill Walker
- Bobby Cyrus
- Charlie Daniels Band
- Chelsea Field
- Chester Lester
- Craig Morrison
- Dale McBride
- Deborah Allen
- Don King
- Exile
- Jan Howard
- Jeanine Walker
- John Daly
- Lane Brody
- Lori Parker
- Maggie Sajak
- Scott Summer
- Sheila Tilton
- Terri Hollowell
- Toy Caldwell

== Series releases ==
- Country Hits You Missed series
- This Is My America compilation featuring Dolly Parton, Billy Dean, and Kathy Mattea

== See also ==
- Con Brio Records
- AristoMedia

== Notes ==
- "Country Artists Soundtrack The Holidays"
- "GMV Nashville Adds Classic Titles To Digital Catalog"
- "Iconic Golfer John Daly Releases New Album, 'I Only Know One Way'"
- "Lacy Green 'For The Summertime' on iTunes"
