= Rollin' Lonely =

Single by Johnny Lee

from the album Workin' for a Livin'
- B-side: "Rock It, Billy"
- Released: December 31, 1984
- Genre: Country
- Length: 3:16
- Label: Warner Bros.
- Songwriters: J.D. Martin, Gary Harrison
- Producer: Jimmy Bowen

Johnny Lee singles chronology
"You Could've Heard a Heart Break" (1984)	"Rollin' Lonely" (1984)	"Save the Last Chance" (1985)

"Rollin' Lonely" is a song written by J.D. Martin and Gary Harrison, and recorded by American country music artist Johnny Lee. It was released in December 1984 as the second single from the album Workin' for a Livin. The song reached number 9 on the Billboard Hot Country Singles & Tracks chart.

== Content ==
One of many songs in country music to pay homage to the American truck driver, the song focuses on the separation-from-family aspect of the profession. Here, a truck driver tells about how he has covered 400 miles since early morning and is determined to cover the remaining 300 miles to arrive home by evening to be with his wife, paying little-to-no heed to the then national speed limit of 55 mph and the weather (he's driving through a pouring rain) while reflecting on the sadness both he and his wife feel prior to his departing for a long trip.

== Chart performance ==
Chart (1984–1985)	Peak position
US Hot Country Songs (Billboard)	9
Canadian RPM Country Tracks	9
