= Johnny Lee (singer) =

American country music singer (born 1946)

Background information
- Born: John Lee Ham; July 3, 1946 (age 80); Texas City, Texas, U.S.
- Origin: Alta Loma, Texas, U.S.
- Genres: Country, countrypolitan
- Occupation: Singer
- Instruments: Vocals, guitar
- Years active: 1976–present
- Labels: Asylum Records; Warner Bros. Records; Curb Records
- Website: www.thejohnnyleemusic.com

Johnny Lee (born John Lee Ham; July 3, 1946) is an American country music singer. His 1980 single "Lookin' for Love" became a crossover hit, spending three weeks at number 1 on the Billboard country singles chart while also appearing in the top 5 on the Billboard Hot 100 chart and top 10 on Billboard's Adult Contemporary chart. He racked up 17 top 40 country hits in the early and mid-1980s.

== Biography ==
Lee was born in Texas City, Texas, and grew up on a dairy farm in nearby Alta Loma (now part of Santa Fe, Texas). In high school he formed a rock n' roll band, "Johnny Lee and the Roadrunners". After graduation, Lee enlisted in the United States Navy and served a tour of duty on the USS Chicago, a guided missile cruiser. After his discharge, he had his name legally changed from John Lee Ham to Johnny Lee. He played cover tunes in Texas nightclubs and bars throughout the late 1960s.

Lee worked 10 years with Mickey Gilley, both on tour and at Gilley’s Club in Pasadena, Texas. The soundtrack from the 1980 hit movie Urban Cowboy, which was largely shot at Gilley's, catapulted Lee to fame. The record spawned several hit singles, including "Lookin' for Love."

Lee also had five other songs reach the top of the Billboard Hot Country Singles chart: "One in a Million" (1980), "Bet Your Heart on Me" (1981), "The Yellow Rose" (1984, a duet with Lane Brody and the theme song to the NBC TV-series of the same name), and "You Could Have Heard a Heartbreak" (1984). His other hits include "Pickin' Up Strangers" (1981), "Prisoner of Hope" (1981), "Cherokee Fiddle" (1982), "Sounds Like Love" (1982), "When You Fall In Love" (1982), "Be There For Me Baby" (1981), "Hey Bartender" (1983), "Rollin' Lonely" (1984), and "Save the Last Chance" (1985).

From 1982 to 1984, Lee was married to Dallas actress Charlene Tilton, with whom he had a daughter, Cherish (born 1982). He married his second wife, Deborah Spohr Lee, in 1986. The couple had a son, Johnny Lee Jr., in 1990 and divorced years later. Deborah died November 7, 2002, after a long battle with prescription painkillers. After Johnny Lee Jr. died in 2014 at the age of 23 of a drug overdose, Lee became active in combating the illegal drug epidemic.

In late 2008, Lee began performing regularly in Branson, Missouri.

== Discography ==
=== Albums ===
Year	Album	Chart Positions		RIAA
Year	Album	US Country	CAN Country	RIAA
1974	For Lovers Only	—	—	—
1977	H-e-e-ere's Johnny!	—	—	—
1980	Lookin' for Love	8	6	Gold
1981	Bet Your Heart on Me	9	—	—
1982	Sounds Like Love	32	—	—
1983	Hey Bartender	15	—	—
1983	Greatest Hits	41	—	—
1984	Til' the Bars Burn Down	23	—	—
1985	Workin' for a Livin	23	—	—
1985	Keep Me Hangin' On	36	—	—
1989	New Directions	—	—	—
1989	Buckmasters Presents: Woods & Water	—	—	—
1990	Greatest Hits Volume 2	—	—	—
1990	The Best of Johnny Lee	—	—	—
1995	Country Party	—	—	—
1996	Ramblin' Rose	—	—	—
1999	Live at Gilley's	—	—	—
2001	At His Best	—	—	—
2002	Live at Billy Bob's Texas	—	—	—
2003	The 13th of July	—	—	—
2003	Greatest Hits	—	—	—
2005	Santa Claus Is Lookin' for Love	—	—	—
2006	Country Candy Store	—	—	—
2016	You Ain't Never Been To Texas	—	—	—
2021	Everything's Gonna Be Alright	—	—	—

=== Singles ===
Year	Single	Chart Positions			Album
Year	Single	US Country	US	CAN Country	Album
1975	"Sometimes"	59	—	—	—N/a
1975	"Red Sails in the Sunset"	22	—	—	H-e-e-ere's Johnny!
1976	"Ramblin' Rose" / "Congratulations"	37	—	—	H-e-e-ere's Johnny!
1977	"Country Party"	15	—	50	H-e-e-ere's Johnny!
1977	"Dear Alice"	58	—	—	H-e-e-ere's Johnny!
1978	"This Time"	43	—	—	H-e-e-ere's Johnny!
1980	"Lookin' for Love"^{[A]}	1	5	18	Lookin' for Love
1980	"One in a Million"	1	102	8	Lookin' for Love
1981	"Pickin' Up Strangers"	3	—	4	Lookin' for Love
1981	"Prisoner of Hope"	3	—	4	Lookin' for Love
1981	"Rode Hard and Put Up Wet"	52	—	—	Urban Cowboy 2
1981	"Bet Your Heart on Me"	1	54	5	Bet Your Heart on Me
1982	"Be There for Me Baby"	10	—	5	Bet Your Heart on Me
1982	"When You Fall in Love"	14	—	46	Bet Your Heart on Me
1982	"Cherokee Fiddle"	10	—	24	Sounds Like Love
1983	"Sounds Like Love"	6	—	9	Sounds Like Love
1983	"Hey Bartender"	2	—	1	Hey Bartender
1983	"My Baby Don't Slow Dance"	23	—	13	Hey Bartender
1984	"The Yellow Rose" (with Lane Brody)	1	—	1	'Til the Bars Burn Down
1984	"One More Shot"	42	—	26	'Til the Bars Burn Down
1984	"You Could've Heard a Heart Break"	1	—	2	Workin' for a Livin'
1985	"Rollin' Lonely"	9	—	9	Workin' for a Livin'
1985	"Save the Last Chance"	12	—	12	Keep Me Hangin' On
1985	"They Never Had to Get Over You"	19	—	57	Keep Me Hangin' On
1986	"The Loneliness in Lucy's Eyes (The Life Sue Ellen Is Living)"	56	—	—	Dallas: The Music Story
1986	"I Could Get Used to This" (with Lane Brody)	50	—	—	—N/a
1989	"Maybe I Won't Love You Anymore"	59	—	—	New Directions
1989	"I'm Not Over You"	69	—	—	New Directions
1989	"I Can Be a Heartbreaker Too"	53	—	—	New Directions
1989	"You Can't Fly Like an Eagle"	66	—	—	New Directions
1990	"Heart to Heart Talk"	—^{[A]}	—	—	New Directions
1990	"Dangerously Lonely"	—	—	—	The Best of Johnny Lee
1990	"Money in My Pocket"	—	—	—	The Best of Johnny Lee
2016	"Never Been to Texas"	—	—	—	You Ain't Never Been to Texas

=== Charted B-sides ===
Year	B-side	Chart Positions	Original A-side
Year	B-side	US Country	Original A-side
1984	"Say When"	flip	"The Yellow Rose"

Notes

- A "Lookin' for Love" also peaked at No. 20 on the RPM Adult Contemporary Tracks chart and No. 54 on the RPM Top Singles chart in Canada.
- B "Heart to Heart Talk" did not chart on Hot Country Songs, but peaked at No. 4 on Hot Country Radio Breakouts.

== Awards and nominations ==
=== Grammy Awards ===
Year	Nominee / work	Award	Result
1981	"Lookin' for Love"	Best Male Country Vocal Performance	Nominated

=== Music City News Country Awards ===
Year	Nominee / work	Award	Result
1981	Johnny Lee	Most Promising Male Artist	Nominated

=== Academy of Country Music Awards ===
Year	Nominee / work	Award	Result
1977	Johnny Lee	Most Promising Male Vocalist	Nominated
1981	Johnny Lee	Top New Male Vocalist	Won
1981	"Lookin' for Love"	Song of the Year	Nominated
1981	"Lookin' for Love"	Single Record of the Year	Nominated

== Other sources ==
- "Johnny Lee Biography". CMT.com. Retrieved May 27, 2005.
- "Johnny Lee - Biography". Official Johnny Lee Fan Club website. Retrieved May 27, 2005.
- Johnny Lee with Randy Wyles. 1989. Lookin' for love. Diamond Books.
- Smith, Tumbleweed (November 2014). "Johnny Lee Still Singing Those Hits". Ranch and Rural Living. 96 (2). San Angelo: 4. ProQuest 1624965880.
