= The Yellow Rose =

- Genre: Soap opera
- Created by: John Wilder; Michael Zinberg
- Starring: Sam Elliott; David Soul; Edward Albert; Cybill Shepherd
- Opening theme: "The Yellow Rose"; performed by Johnny Lee and Lane Brody
- Composers: Jerrold Immel; John Elizalde
- Country of origin: United States
- Original language: English
- No. of seasons: 1
- No. of episodes: 22

Production
- Running time: 60 minutes
- Production companies: John Wilder-Michael Zinberg Productions; Warner Bros. Television

Original release
- Network: NBC
- Release: October 2, 1983 – May 12, 1984

The Yellow Rose is an American soap opera television series that was broadcast on NBC from October 2, 1983, until May 12, 1984. The series was produced by Paul Freeman and was at least partly inspired by the more coltish elements of the soap opera Dallas, and dealt with the intrigues of the Texas-based Champion family who owned a 200,000-acre cattle and oil ranch called "The Yellow Rose".

The Yellow Rose was canceled after one season of 22 episodes. In 1990, the series was rerun again on NBC along with Bret Maverick starring James Garner.

== Cast and characters ==
- Sam Elliott as Chance McKenzie, an ex-convict and the illegitimate son of the ranch's late owner Wade Champion
- David Soul as Roy Champion, one of Wade's sons
- Susan Anspach as Grace McKenzie, the ranch's housekeeper (eps. 1–9)
- Edward Albert as Ramon "Quisto" Champion, one of Wade's sons
- Noah Beery, Jr. as Luther Dillard, ranch hand
- Ken Curtis as Hoyt Coryell, ranch hand
- Tom Schanley as Whit Champion, Roy's son
- Michelle Bennett as Love Child "L.C." Champion, Colleen's daughter
- Chuck Connors as Jeb Hollister, Roy's nemesis and former owner of the ranch (eps. 10–17; recurring 1–9)
- Cybill Shepherd as Colleen Champion, Wade's widow

Notable recurring characters include Will Sampson as ranch hand John Stronghart, Steve Sandor and Deborah Shelton as Jeb's children, Lenny and Juliette Hollister, Kerrie Keane as Jeb's personal assistant Caryn Cabrera and Jane Russell as Rose Hollister, Chance's mother and Jeb's sister, and Barney McFadden as Rudy Lansing.

== Episodes ==
No.	Title	Directed by	Written by	Original release date	Viewers (millions)
1	"The Yellow Rose"	Harvey Hart	John Wilder	October 2, 1983	16.1
2	"Divided We Fall"	Lee H. Katzin	Story by : John Wilder & Michael Zinberg; Teleplay by : Paul F. Edwards & John Wilder	October 15, 1983	11.2
3	"When Honor Dies"	Lee H. Katzin	Story by : John Wilder & Michael Zinberg; Teleplay by : Jeb Rosebrook & John Wilder	October 22, 1983	8.4
4	"Walls of Fear"	Burt Kennedy	Story by : John Wilder & Jeb Rosebrook; Teleplay by : Sean Meredith	October 29, 1983	10.1
5	"Sins of the Father"	Burt Kennedy	Story by : John Wilder & Michael Zinberg; Teleplay by : Paul Savage & Kathleen A. Shelley	November 5, 1983	8.7
6	"Breaking Trail"	Lee H. Katzin	Paul F. Edwards & John Wilder	November 12, 1983	11.8
7	"Moving Targets"	Lee H. Katzin	Story by : John Wilder & Jeb Rosebrook; Teleplay by : Paul F. Edwards	November 19, 1983	11.3
8	"Trail's End"	Lee H. Katzin	Story by : John Wilder; Teleplay by : John Wilder & Paul F. Edwards	November 26, 1983	8.9
9	"A Question of Love"	Lee H. Katzin	John Wilder	December 10, 1983	10.3
10	"Only the Proud"	Harry Falk	John Wilder	December 17, 1983	9.6
11	"Divide and Conquer"	Lee H. Katzin	Paul F. Edwards, Lew Hunter & John Wilder	January 7, 1984	9.6
12	"Hell Hath No Fury"	Jack Whitman	Colley Cibber & Paul Savage	January 14, 1984	11.5
13	"Deadline"	Lee H. Katzin	Colley Cibber & Paul Savage	January 21, 1984	11.8
14	"Land of the Free"	Lee H. Katzin	Paul Savage	February 11, 1984	10.4
15	"Sport of Kings"	Harry Falk	Jerry Ziegman	February 18, 1984	10.7
16	"Running Free"	Lee H. Katzin	Josef Anderson	February 25, 1984	10.5
17	"Sacred Ground"	Harry Falk	Gerald Di Pego & Janet Kapsin	March 10, 1984	10.8
18	"Debt of Honor"	William Wiard	Jeb Rosebrook	March 17, 1984	9.6
19	"Chains of Fear"	Paul Krasny	Paul F. Edwards	March 24, 1984	10.6
20	"Beyond Vengeance"	Bernard McEveety	Paul Savage	April 28, 1984	9.2
21	"Villa's Gold"	Paul Krasny	Garner Simmons	May 5, 1984	9.7
22	"The Far Side of Fear"	Gary Griffin	Cliff Gould	May 12, 1984	9.1

== US television ratings ==
Season	Episodes	Start date	End date	Nielsen rank	Nielsen rating
1983–84	22	October 2, 1983	May 12, 1984	90	10.1 (Note: Tied with Manimal)

== Theme song ==
The series' theme song "The Yellow Rose" — set to the tune of the traditional "The Yellow Rose of Texas" but with new lyrics referencing the setting of the show — was recorded by country singers Johnny Lee and Lane Brody. The song became a No. 1 hit on the Billboard Hot Country Singles chart on April 21, 1984.

== Home media ==
Warner Bros. released the complete series to DVD on May 3, 2011, via the Warner Archive Collection.
