= You Could've Heard a Heart Break =

1984 single by Johnny Lee

Single by Johnny Lee

from the album Workin' for a Livin'
- Released: August 20, 1984
- Genre: Country
- Length: 3:16
- Label: Warner Bros.
- Songwriter(s): Marc Rossi
- Producer(s): Jimmy Bowen

Johnny Lee singles chronology
"One More Shot" (1984)	"You Could've Heard a Heart Break" (1984)	"Rollin' Lonely" (1984)

"You Could've Heard a Heart Break" is a song written by Marc Rossi, and recorded by American country music artist Johnny Lee. It was released in August 1984 as the lead single from the album Workin' for a Livin. The song was Lee's fifth and final number one on the country chart. The single spent one week at number one and spent a total of fourteen weeks on the country chart.

== Chart performance ==
Chart (1984)	Peak position
US Hot Country Songs (Billboard)	1
Canadian RPM Country Tracks	2
