= The Yellow Rose (song) =

Single by Johnny Lee with Lane Brody

from the album 'Til the Bars Burn Down
- B-side: "Say When"
- Released: February 1984
- Genre: Country
- Length: 2:26
- Label: Warner Bros.
- Songwriter(s): Johnny Lee, Lane Brody, John Wilder
- Producer(s): Jimmy Bowen

Johnny Lee singles chronology
"My Baby Don't Slow Dance" (1983)	"The Yellow Rose" (1984)	"One More Shot" (1984)

Lane Brody singles chronology
"It's Another Silent Night" (1983)	"The Yellow Rose" (1984)	"Hanging On" (1984)

"The Yellow Rose" is a song co-written and recorded by American country music singers Johnny Lee and Lane Brody, set to the tune of the folk song "The Yellow Rose of Texas." It was recorded as the theme song to the NBC television series of the same name starring Cybill Shepherd, and was included on Lee's 1984 studio album ‘Til the Bars Burn Down. Released as a single in early 1984, "The Yellow Rose" was a Number One country hit in both the United States and Canada, and gave Brody her only Number One country hit and Lee his fourth.

== Content ==
"The Yellow Rose" is set to the same melody as the traditional American folk song "The Yellow Rose of Texas," but with newly-written lyrics by Johnny Lee, Lane Brody and John Wilder.

== In popular culture ==
The song was used for the theme song to the NBC television series The Yellow Rose, starring Cybill Shepherd. While the television show used only the song's first verse and chorus, the commercial single version included a second verse not heard on the program, with Lee's "Say When" on the B-side. Brody and Lee would later chart a second duet, "I Could Get Used to This," in 1986, although it was never included on an album.

== Chart performance ==
"The Yellow Rose" made its chart debut on the Billboard Hot Country Singles (now Hot Country Songs) charts dated for the week of February 4, 1984. The song spent twenty-two weeks on the charts, reaching Number One on the chart dated or April 21 and holding that position for one week. It gave Lee the fourth of five Number One hits in his career, and Brody her only Number One. It was also a Number One hit on the Canadian RPM Country Tracks charts, peaking on the week of May 5, 1984.

=== Weekly charts ===
Chart (1984)	Peak position
US Hot Country Songs (Billboard)	1
Canadian RPM Country Tracks	1

=== Year-end charts ===
Chart (1984)	Position
US Hot Country Songs (Billboard)	21
