= Don King (musician) =

American retired musician (born 1954)

- Born: Donald Alan King; May 4, 1954 (age 72)
- Origin: Fremont, Nebraska, U.S.
- Genres: Country, Nashville Sound
- Occupation: Singer-songwriter
- Instruments: Vocals, guitar, trumpet
- Years active: 1976–1981
- Labels: Con Brio, Epic, Readio Theatre

Donald Alan King (born May 4, 1954, in Fremont, Nebraska) is an American singer, songwriter, guitarist, and trumpeter. In the 1970s and 1980s, he recorded a total of four major label albums, and charted more than fifteen hit singles on the Billboard country music charts. He is not to be confused with Donny King, a Freddy Fender sideman who had several charting solo singles in 1975-76.

== Early career ==
His first job was at a Quality Inn club in Nashville in 1974, where he was able to make valuable connections. He signed with Con Brio Records and in 1976 his song "Cabin High (In the Blue Ridge Mountains)" placed him on the charts. In 1977 he reached the Top 20 with "I've Got You to Come Home To", after which he released his first album, Dreams 'n Things. His second album, Feelings So Right, (1978) yielded four Top 30 hits. In 1979, the single "Lonely Hotel" reached the Top 40. After two more hits in 1980 he began touring with well-known artists, such as Alabama, Reba McEntire, John Anderson, The Oak Ridge Boys, Conway Twitty, and Tammy Wynette. In 1981, he reached the Top 40 twice, first with his cover of Johnny Cash's "I Still Miss Someone" and then with "The Closer You Get." That same year he released his third album, Whirlwind.

Members of King's road band went on to become the country music group Sawyer Brown.

== Later years ==
By the end of 1981, he had launched the Don King Music Group, a recording studio, with his father. In 1985 they built a 24-track studio to record demos. In 1992, they added a video production company. In late 2007, GMV Nashville released two albums on King, and in 2008 they released two more, many including unreleased tracks.

Since 2007, Don King has been performing with The Road Crew 'America's Route 66 Band.' The Road Crew received the first Bobby Troup Artistic Achievement Award presented by the International Route 66 Association. The band are the official musical ambassadors of The Mother Road. The Road Crew bandmates are Woody Bomar, Jason Harmon and (songwriting partner) Joe Loesch.

Don King was inducted into The Old Time Country Music Hall of Fame by The National Traditional Country Music Association in 2015. This distinction honors his years of advancing traditional country music throughout his touring and recording career.

== Discography ==
=== Albums ===
Year	Album	US Country	Label
1975	Dreams 'n Things	42	Con Brio Records
1978	The Feelings So Right	—	Con Brio Records
1980	Lonely Hotel	—	Epic
1981	Whirlwind	—	Epic
2006	Hymns of Faith	—	Radio Theatre
2007	Don King Collection Vol.1	—	GMV Nashville
2007	Don King Collection Vol.2	—	GMV Nashville
2008	Thanks to You	—	GMV Nashville
2008	Days of You and Me	—	GMV Nashville

=== Singles ===
Year	Single	US Country	Album
1976	"Cabin High (In the Blue Ridge Mountains)"	78	Dreams and Things
1977	"I've Got You (To Come Home To)"	16	Dreams and Things
1977	"She's the Girl of My Dreams"	17	Dreams and Things
1977	"I Must Be Dreaming"	41	Dreams and Things
1978	"Music Is My Woman"	29	The Feelings So Right
1978	"Don't Make No Promises (You Can't Keep)"	29	The Feelings So Right
1978	"The Feelings So Right Tonight"	26	The Feelings So Right
1979	"You Were Worth Waiting For"	28	The Feelings So Right
1979	"Live Entertainment"	39	The Feelings So Right
1979	"I've Got Country Music in My Soul"	73	The Feelings So Right
1980	"Lonely Hotel"	40	Lonely Hotel
1980	"Here Comes That Feeling Again"	32	Lonely Hotel
1980	"Take This Heart"	44	Lonely Hotel
1981	"I Still Miss Someone"	38	Whirlwind
1981	"The Closer You Get"	27	Whirlwind
1982	"Running on Love"	40	Whirlwind
1982	"Maximum Security (To Minimum Wage)"	64	singles only
1986	"All We Had Was One Another"	71	singles only
1988	"Can't Stop the Music"	86	singles only

== Awards and nominations ==
Year	Organization	Award	Nominee/Work	Result
1981	Academy of Country Music Awards	Top New Male Vocalist	Don King	Nominated
