= Simon Keller =

New Zealand philosopher

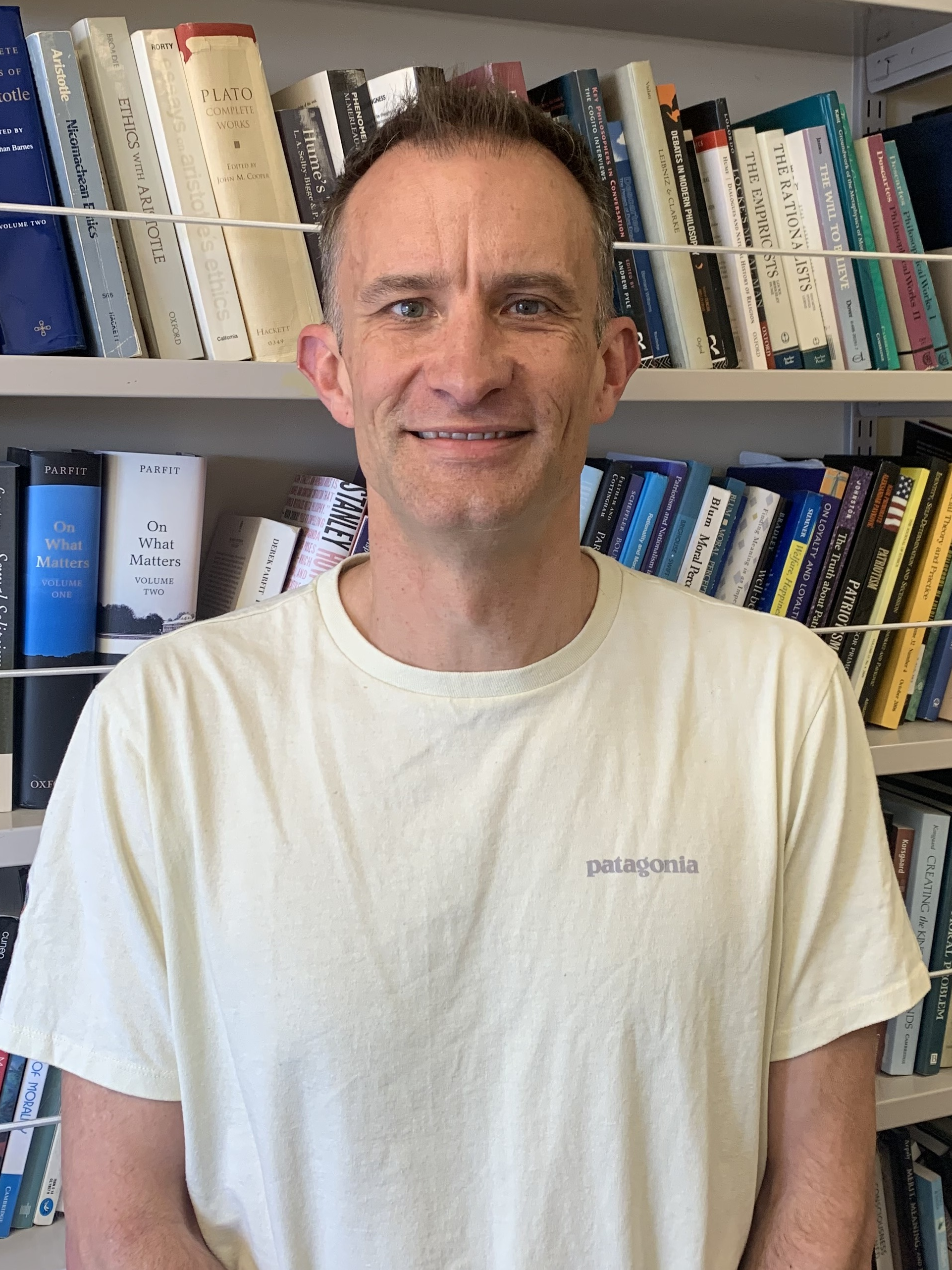
- Born: 1973 (age 52–53)

Academic background
- Education: Princeton University
- Thesis: On Welfare (2002)

Academic work
- Discipline: Philosopher
- Institutions: Boston University; University of Melbourne; Victoria University of Wellington
- Main interests: Ethics and the philosophy of mental health

Simon Tait Keller (born 1973) is a philosophy academic, and a full professor at Victoria University of Wellington in New Zealand. As at 2023, he is head of the School of History, Philosophy, Political Science and International Relations. His work focusses on political philosophy, ethics and the philosophy of mental health. He has published works on topics including family relationships, friendships, the moral and political dimensions of relationships, patriotism and the possibility of time travel.

In 2023, Keller was elected a Fellow of the Royal Society of New Zealand.

== Career ==
Keller completed under-graduate studies at Monash University in Melbourne, Australia, gaining a B.A. and B.Sc.

He subsequently studied at Princeton University and received a PhD in Philosophy in 2002. Keller held teaching positions at Boston University and the University of Melbourne, and was a visiting professor at Rice University. In 2009, he was appointed as associate professor of philosophy at Victoria University of Wellington, and became a full professor in 2014. As at 2023, he is head of the School of History, Philosophy, Political Science and International Relations.

Keller has appeared on the New Zealand national radio network RNZ on multiple occasions, covering topics including: the philosophy of vegetarianism, the ethical issues raised by the publication of the book Dirty Politics by Nicky Hager, political rebellion and revolution and the philosophy of mental health.

In 2015, Keller presented a talk on Patriotism in peace and war, as part of a series on conflict jointly organised by Victoria University of Wellington and the National Library of New Zealand.

In 2017, Keller wrote an opinion piece The dangerous ideal of mental health for a national news service. He argued that the modern concept of a healthy mind as a positive construction, and something to strive towards, should be treated with suspicion because of the lack of clarity about what good mental health looks like. Reactions included disagreement from the New Zealand Mental Health Foundation, who argued that mental health should not be seen only as a negative concept, and that treating it that way leads to stigma and barriers.

Keller was a Visiting Fellow at the Centre for Advanced Studies at LMU Munich from November 2017 to January 2018 and again in October 2019.

In 2022, Keller presented a talk at one of the new fellows seminars given by Royal Society Te Apārangi, entitled Mental health as an ethical concept.

== Selected publications ==
- Keller, Simon (2009). The Limits of Loyalty. Cambridge University Press. ISBN 978-0-51148759-0.
- Keller, Simon (2013). Partiality. Princeton University Press. ISBN 978-0-69115473-2.
- Kleinig, John; Keller, Simon; Primoratz, Igor (2015). The Ethics of Patriotism: A Debate. Wiley Blackwell. ISBN 978-0-470-65885-7.
- Keller, Simon (2018). "Fiduciary Duties and Moral Blackmail". Journal of Applied Philosophy. 35 (3): 481–495. doi:10.1111/japp.12234.
- Keller, Simon (2022). "Mental Health in Old Age". In C.S. Wareham (ed.), The Cambridge Handbook of the Ethics of Ageing (pp. 79–91). Cambridge University Press. ISBN 978-1-10881704-2.

== Honours and awards ==
In 2009, Keller's book The Limits of Loyalty was the winner of the American Philosophical Association Book Prize.

In 2018, his paper Fiduciary Duties and Moral Blackmail won the Journal of Applied Philosophy Essay Prize.

In 2023, Keller was elected a Fellow of the Royal Society of New Zealand.

== Personal life ==
Keller is an athlete, and competes in distance running events. He competes as an individual in regional and national events, and in team events for the club Wellington Scottish Athletics. He is also a regular author of items about running published on the club website.
