= AristoMedia =

AristoMedia(or The AristoMedia Group)
- Company type: Private
- Industry: Country Music
- Founded: 1980
- Founder: Jeff Walker
- Headquarters: Nashville, Tennessee, USA
- Website: http://www.aristomedia.com

The AristoMedia Group is a Nashville-based, independent entertainment marketing/media/promotion firm representing country music artists and industry clients. The company was founded in 1980 by former Con Brio Records Vice President, Jeff Walker. Primary services The AristoMedia Group provides include: Christian and Country video promotion, secondary radio promotion, dance club venue marketing and promotion, new media services, entertainment publicity and video content/EPK distribution.

The AristoMedia Group is comprised specifically of the following branded divisions and services: Aristo PR (publicity), AristoVision (Christian video promotion), AristoVideo (Country video promotion), AristoWorks (new media services), The Goodland Group (video reel distribution), Jeff Walker & Associates (international and domestic entertainment consultation), Marco Music Group (secondary radio promotion), Marco Club Connection (dance club venue marketing), The Goodland Group (music publishing) and DownCast (video content and EPK distribution service).

== History ==
Jeff Walker established The AristoMedia Group as a publicity and PR firm in April 1980. In 1984 the company established AristoVideo and started offering country music video promotion services. The company began offering Christian music video promotion services in 1989.

The Marco Music group and its radio promotion division, Marco Promotions, was established in 1991. The Goodland Group, a division of AristoMedia, was established in 1994, and in 1995, Jeff Walker and Associated was founded.

Walkerbout Music, the publishing arm of The AristoMedia Group, was re-launched in 2003. In 2004, Marco Club Connection, the dance venue promotion division of Marco Promotions, was established.

In 2005, the AristoMedia Group created and hosted the first Aristo Global Showcase, an international artist showcase held each year during CMA Music Festival week in downtown Nashville, Tennessee. In 2006, the group launched AristoWorks (new media), branded Christian video services division as AristoVision. GMV Nashville, an online record label offering digital downloads of classic and contemporary Country artists, was launched in 2007.

In 2009, in partnership with Travis Television Productions, AristoMedia co-developed the DownCast service, a video content and electronic press kit distribution service. In 2013, the group expanded JWA into international project management.
