= Dale McBride =

American singer-songwriter (1936–1992)

- Born: December 18, 1936
- Origin: Lampasas, Texas, United States
- Died: November 30, 1992 (aged 55)
- Genres: Country
- Occupation: Singer-songwriter
- Instruments: Vocals, guitar
- Years active: 1950s–1992
- Labels: Reprise; Thunderbird; Con Brio; GMV Nashville
- Website: www.dalemcbride.com

Dale McBride (December 18, 1936 – November 30, 1992) was an American country music singer. In the 1970s, he charted several singles on the Billboard country charts, including two Top 40 hits on the Con Brio Records label. His son is Terry McBride, who fronted the 1990s country band McBride & the Ride and has written singles for Brooks & Dunn. McBride died in 1992 of a brain tumor.

== Biography ==
Dale McBride was born in Lampasas, Texas, on December 18, 1936. He began recording in the 1950s, having several local rockabilly hits in Mississippi. In the late 1960s, McBride was discovered by Dean Martin, who signed him to a contract with Reprise Records. At the time, however, the label was focused mainly on the adult contemporary radio format, and McBride did not have significant success on the label. He later moved to Thunderbird Records, where he began recording country music cover songs and original material. This label also produced his first chart single in "Corpus Christi Wind".

Between 1976 and 1979, McBride recorded for Con Brio Records, charting several singles including two Top 40 country hits. After leaving the label, he continued to record into the 1980s, with his son Terry playing in his band. Terry McBride had several chart singles in the 1990s as lead singer of the band McBride & the Ride. Dale McBride died of a brain tumor in 1992.

In 2007, GMV Nashville released a remastered version of The Dale McBride Collection, an album originally released in 1992 following McBride's death. Soon after in 2008, the label also released Takin' A Long Look.

== Discography ==
=== Albums ===
Year	Album	Chart Positions	Label
Year	Album	US Country	Label
–	Dale McBride Sings I Can't Ever Free My Mind and Am I Easy To Forget	–	Teardrop Records
1967	The Shadow of Your Smile	–	Atom Records
1970	Hey! Won't You Play	–	a+r Records
–	Live	–	–
1970	My Kind of Country	–	Thunderbird Records
1977	The Ordinary Man Album	42	Con Brio Records
1978	Let's Be Lonely Together	–	Con Brio Records
–	So Let It Shine, Let It Shine	–	–
–	A New Song To Sing	–	–
–	Waking Up in the US	–	Concorde
2007	The Dale McBride Collection (Remastered)	–	GMV Nashville
2008	Takin' A Long Look	–	GMV Nashville

=== Singles ===
Year	Single	Chart Positions	Album
Year	Single	US Country	Album
1971	"Corpus Christi Wind"	70	Single only
1976	"Getting Over You Again"	90	The Ordinary Man Album
1976	"Ordinary Man"	26	The Ordinary Man Album
1977	"I'm Savin' Up Sunshine"	60	The Ordinary Man Album
1977	"Love I Need You"	53	The Ordinary Man Album
1977	"My Girl"	73	Singles only
1977	"Always Lovin' Her Man"	37	Singles only
1978	"A Sweet Love Song the World Can Sing"	56	Singles only
1978	"I Don't Like Cheatin' Songs"	45	Singles only
1978	"Let's Be Lonely Together"	72	Singles only
1979	"It's Hell to Know She's Heaven"	66	Singles only
1979	"Getting Over You Again" (re-release)	67	Singles only
1979	"Get Your Hands On Me Baby"	61	Singles only
