= Country (disambiguation) =

A country is a geopolitical area – often synonymous with a sovereign state.

The country, country or countries may also refer to:

- Rural area, the country or countryside, an area away from towns or cities
- Country (identity), a self-concept relating to an individual's attachment to a geographical location
- Country (Indigenous Australians), relating to the traditional lands of Indigenous Australian peoples

== Administrative divisions ==
- Countries of the Kingdom of Denmark, subdivisions of the Kingdom of Denmark
- Countries of the Kingdom of the Netherlands, subdivisions of the Kingdom of the Netherlands
- Countries of the United Kingdom, subdivisions of the United Kingdom
- Overseas country of France (French: Pays d'outre-mer au sein de la République), the specific statute – since 2004 – of French Polynesia within the French Republic

== Arts and entertainment ==
- Country (film), a 1984 U.S. film
- Country (2000 film), a British-Irish film starring Lisa Harrow
- Country (book), published by American Nick Tosches in 1977
- ABC Country, an Australian radio station

=== Music ===
- Country music, a genre of music
- Country (EP), a 2008 EP by Anaïs Mitchell and Rachel Ries
- Country (Anne Murray album), 1974
- Country (Tom Jones album), 1982
- "Country" (Mo Pitney song), released in 2014
- "Country", a song by SZA from See.SZA.Run (2012)
- "C-O-U-N-T-R-Y", a single from American country music singer Joe Diffie's 1995 album Life's So Funny
- "C.O.U.N.T.R.Y.", a song by LoCash Cowboys from the album LoCash Cowboys
- Country Joe McDonald (born 1942), an American musician and singer

== See also ==
- Country Party (disambiguation)
