= United Country Party =

United Country Party may refer to:

- United Country Party (Australia)
- United Country Party (Kenya)
- United Country Party (United Kingdom)
- United Country Party of New South Wales, the name of the New South Wales Branch of the Australian Country Party (now the Nationals) between 1931 and 1944.
