= Country Party (song) =

Single by Johnny Lee

from the album H-e-e-ere's Johnny!
- Released: May 9, 1977
- Genre: Country
- Label: GRT
- Songwriter(s): Rick Nelson

Johnny Lee singles chronology
| "Ramblin' Rose" (1977) | "Country Party" (1977) | "Dear Alice" (1977) |

Country Party is a song written by Rick Nelson and recorded by American country music artist Johnny Lee. It was released in May 1977 as the third single from the album, H-e-e-ere's Johnny!. It is a slight re-write of Rick Nelson's song, Garden Party. The song reached number 15 on the Billboard Hot Country Singles & Tracks chart and number 50 on the Canadian RPM Country Tracks chart.

== Chart performance ==
| Chart (1977) | Peak position |
|---|---|
| US Hot Country Songs (Billboard) | 15 |
| Canadian RPM Country Tracks | 50 |
