= Terri Hollowell =

American singer-songwriter

- Born: July 2, 1956 (age 70); Jeffersonville, Indiana, United States
- Genre: Country
- Occupation: Singer
- Years active: 1978–1980
- Labels: Con Brio Records; GMV Nashville

Terri Hollowell (born July 2, 1956, in Jeffersonville, Indiana), is an American singer. She had five nationally charted singles between 1978 and 1980, has toured internationally, and has appeared on numerous nationally televised programs.

== Career ==
Hollowell became interested in a full-time career in music during her high school days in her hometown of Jeffersonville, Indiana. She signed with Con Brio Records in May 1978 and in the following two years she had five nationally charted singles. Her release of "May I" broke her into the national country Top 40 in mid 1979,. and "It’s Too Soon To Say Goodbye" yielded her first ASCAP Award for chart longevity in October 1979. She recorded a remake of "Strawberry Fields Forever" by The Beatles. This release hit the national Billboard charts seven days after its release and remained for eight weeks. She performed on national television in three continents; namely, the United States, Australia, and the United Kingdom and her first album entitled Just You And Me was well received by critics in all three regions. The album had also been released in Canada and several Scandinavian countries. She made five trips to England between 1978 and 1980 and appeared in the Wembley Festival ( | ), toured with country singer Don Williams in a national sell-out tour, co-hosted four BBC TV Specials, headlined her own club tour, and appeared with such artists as Johnny Cash and Glen Campbell on the Portsmouth Festival in 1979.

In 1980, she retired to spend time with her family.

In 2007 GMV Nashville released several albums on Hollowell, including songs that never released.

== Albums ==
Year	Album	Label
1979	Just You And Me	Con Brio Records
2007	Terri Hollowell Collection	GMV Nashville
2007	Just Stay With Me	GMV Nashville
2008	Sunshine Love	GMV Nashville

== Singles ==
Year	Single	Chart Positions	Album
Year	Single	US Country	Album
1978	"Just Say With Me"	76	Just You And Me
1978	"Happy Go Lucky Morning"	81	Just You And Me
1978	"Strawberry Fields Forever"	76	Just You And Me
1979	"It's Too Soon To Say Goodbye"	56	Just You And Me
1979	"May I(See You Again)"	35	Just You And Me
