= Lampasas, Texas =

- City
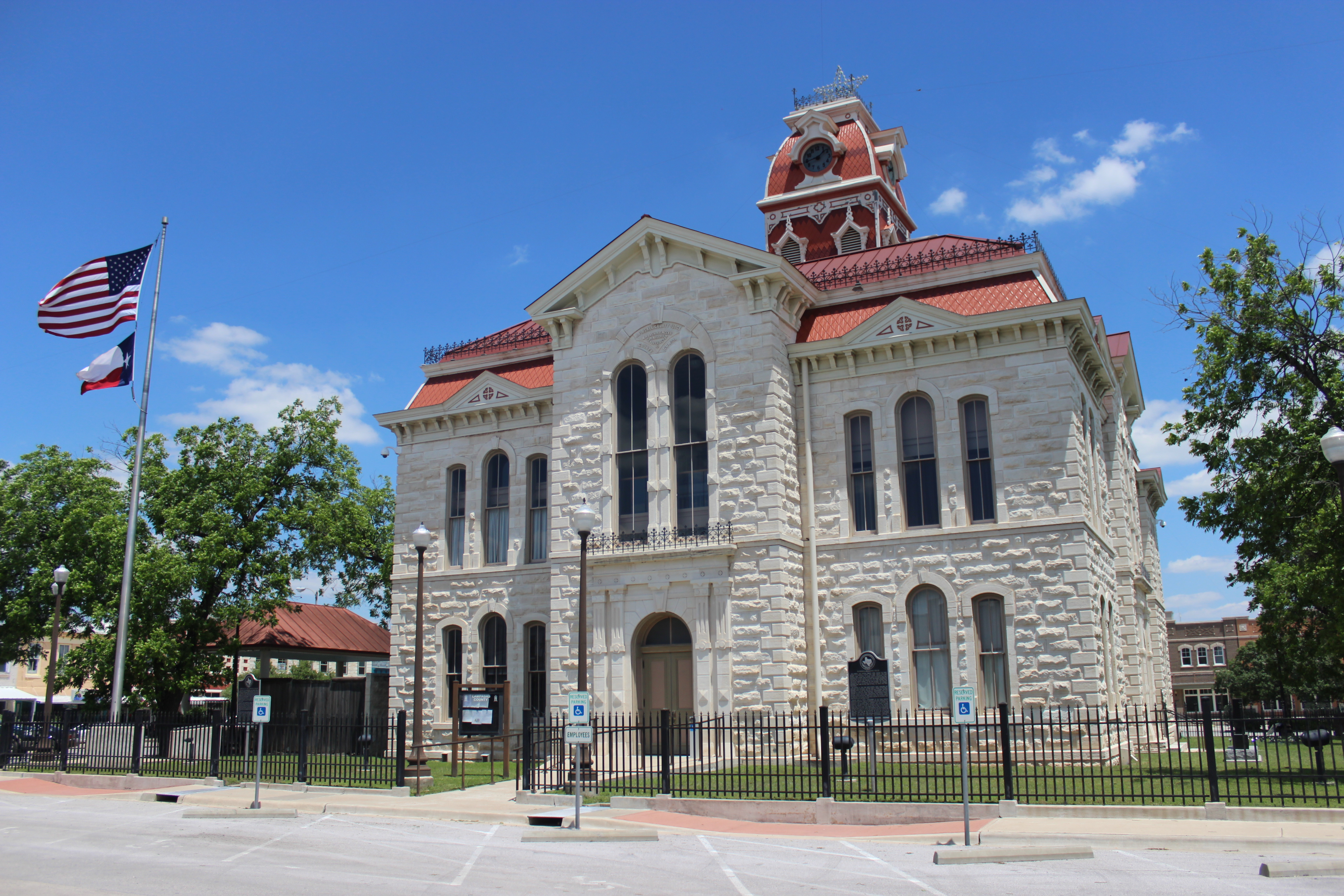
- The Lampasas County Courthouse was completed in 1884. The structure was added to the National Register of Historic Places on June 21, 1971.

- Location of Lampasas, Texas
- Coordinates: 31°03′51″N 98°10′58″W
- Country: United States
- State: Texas
- County: Lampasas
- Incorporated: 1883

Government
  - Mayor: TJ Monroe
  - City Manager: Finley deGraffenried
  - Police Chief: Jody Cummings

Area
  - Total: 7.33 sq mi (18.98 km^{2})
  - Land: 7.31 sq mi (18.94 km^{2})
  - Water: 0.015 sq mi (0.04 km^{2})
- Elevation: 1,030 ft (310 m)

Population (2020)
  - Total: 7,291
  - Density: 997.0/sq mi (385.0/km^{2})
- Time zone: UTC-6 (Central (CST))
  - Summer (DST): UTC-5 (CDT)
- ZIP code: 76550
- Area code: 512
- FIPS code: 48-41188
- GNIS feature ID: 2411619
- Website: www.lampasas.org

Lampasas (/læmˈpæsəs/ lam-PASS-əs) is a city in and the county seat of Lampasas County, Texas, United States. Its population was 7,291 at the 2020 census.

Lampasas is part of the Killeen – Temple – Fort Hood metropolitan area.

== History ==
For his services in the Texas Revolution, John Burleson received 1,280 acres (5.2 km^{2}) of land and established a permanent settlement in the 1850s. The city was first named Burleson, but the name was gradually changed to Lampasas Springs because of the existence of seven mineral springs. When the county was created in 1856, the law specified "The county seat shall be same name as the county." The city of Lampasas was officially incorporated in 1883.

Several theories attempt to explain how the name Lampasas came to be. The Texas Almanac states the word came from a Spanish word for "lilies" found in nearby streams. Another source states the word comes from the Spanish name Lampazos. The name was given to the local river by the Spanish Aquayo Expedition in 1721. It is believed the name was inspired by a Mexican town that also had beautiful springs. The town was also the location of the birth of the Farmers' Alliance, founded in 1876.

In 1952 the US military conducted an experimental drill in which Lampasas was supposedly conquered by a foreign adversary that flooded the town with propaganda, with local officials taking part. Military operations were conducted outside the town.

In the Mother's Day Flood of 1957, Sulphur Creek, a local river, struck the city in devastating flash flood that claimed five lives and destroyed many homes, businesses, and other property around downtown Lampasas. In the aftermath, a series of levees and reservoirs was constructed to prevent damage from future catastrophes.

Since 1972, Lampasas has held an annual fair called the Spring Ho festival each July.

== Geography ==
The most notable waterway is Sulphur Creek, which flows from the southwest to the northeast through the south-central part of the city.

According to the United States Census Bureau, the city has a total area of 6.3 square miles (16.1 km^{2}), of which 0.04 square miles (0.10 km^{2}) (0.64%) is covered by water.

=== Climate ===
The climate in this area is characterized by hot, humid summers and generally mild to cool winters. According to the Köppen climate classification, Lampasas has a humid subtropical climate, Cfa.

Climate data for Lampasas, Texas
Month	Jan	Feb	Mar	Apr	May	Jun	Jul	Aug	Sep	Oct	Nov	Dec	Year
Record high °F (°C)	95.0 (35.0)	99.0 (37.2)	100.0 (37.8)	103.0 (39.4)	104.0 (40.0)	108.0 (42.2)	112.0 (44.4)	112.0 (44.4)	108.0 (42.2)	104.0 (40.0)	93.0 (33.9)	90.0 (32.2)	112.0 (44.4)
Mean daily maximum °F (°C)	60.9 (16.1)	63.5 (17.5)	70.7 (21.5)	78.9 (26.1)	85.3 (29.6)	91.3 (32.9)	95.1 (35.1)	96.1 (35.6)	89.6 (32.0)	80.5 (26.9)	70.1 (21.2)	61.1 (16.2)	78.6 (25.9)
Mean daily minimum °F (°C)	35.6 (2.0)	38.8 (3.8)	45.7 (7.6)	54.0 (12.2)	63.1 (17.3)	69.7 (20.9)	72.3 (22.4)	71.8 (22.1)	65.8 (18.8)	55.8 (13.2)	45.6 (7.6)	36.0 (2.2)	54.5 (12.5)
Record low °F (°C)	−12.0 (−24.4)	−11.0 (−23.9)	12.0 (−11.1)	24.0 (−4.4)	32.0 (0.0)	47.0 (8.3)	42.0 (5.6)	38.0 (3.3)	33.0 (0.6)	20.0 (−6.7)	12.0 (−11.1)	−7.0 (−21.7)	−12.0 (−24.4)
Average precipitation inches (mm)	1.9 (48)	2.3 (58)	3.0 (76)	2.2 (56)	4.1 (100)	4.3 (110)	1.8 (46)	1.8 (46)	2.9 (74)	3.5 (89)	2.5 (64)	2.2 (56)	32.5 (823)
Average precipitation days (≥ 0.01 in)	6	6	7	5	7	6	4	4	5	6	6	6	68
Source 1: bestplace.net
Source 2: Weatherbase

== Demographics ==
Historical population
Census	Pop.	Note	%±
1880	653		—
1890	2,408		268.8%
1900	2,107		−12.5%
1910	2,119		0.6%
1920	2,107		−0.6%
1930	2,709		28.6%
1940	3,426		26.5%
1950	4,869		42.1%
1960	5,061		3.9%
1970	5,922		17.0%
1980	6,165		4.1%
1990	6,382		3.5%
2000	6,786		6.3%
2010	6,681		−1.5%
2020	7,291		9.1%
2021 (est.)	7,517		3.1%
U.S. Decennial Census

=== 2020 census ===
As of the 2020 census, there were 7,291 people, 2,974 households, and 1,782 families residing in the city. The population density was 1,097.3 inhabitants per square mile (423.7/km^{2}). The median age was 40.8 years. 23.4% of residents were under the age of 18 and 21.2% of residents were 65 years of age or older. For every 100 females there were 93.5 males, and for every 100 females age 18 and over there were 88.8 males.

There were 2,974 households in Lampasas, of which 31.4% had children under the age of 18 living in them. Of all households, 43.0% were married-couple households, 18.8% were households with a male householder and no spouse or partner present, and 31.2% were households with a female householder and no spouse or partner present. About 31.7% of all households were made up of individuals and 16.7% had someone living alone who was 65 years of age or older.

There were 3,280 housing units, of which 9.3% were vacant. The homeowner vacancy rate was 3.2% and the rental vacancy rate was 5.0%.

90.8% of residents lived in urban areas, while 9.2% lived in rural areas.

Racial composition as of the 2020 census
Race	Number	Percent
White	5,517	75.7%
Black or African American	112	1.5%
American Indian and Alaska Native	58	0.8%
Asian	55	0.8%
Native Hawaiian and Other Pacific Islander	7	0.1%
Some other race	640	8.8%
Two or more races	902	12.4%
Hispanic or Latino (of any race)	1,853	25.4%

=== 2010 census ===
Of the 2,554 households, 33.7% had children under 18 living with them, 48.4% were married couples living together, 13.9% had a female householder with no husband present, and 33.0% were not families. About 29.5% of all households were made up of individuals, and 16.1% had someone living alone who was 65 years of age or older. The average household size was 2.54, and the average family size was 3.13.

In the city, the population was distributed as 27.6% under the age of 18, 8.2% from 18 to 24, 25.2% from 25 to 44, 20.2% from 45 to 64, and 18.8% who were 65 or older. The median age was 36 years. For every 100 females, there were 88.9 males. For every 100 females 18 and over, there were 84.0 males.

=== 2000 census ===
The median income for a household in the city was $27,898, and for a family was $31,012. Males had a median income of $26,606 versus $19,959 for females. The per capita income for the city was $13,409. About 18.3% of families and 21.1% of the population were below the poverty line, including 28.5% of those under age 18 and 16.9% of those age 65 or over.

== Notable people ==
- The Horrell brothers, outlaws of the Old West
- John Wesley "Lam" Jones, former sprinter (gold medal at the 1976 Summer Olympics) and NFL football player
- Dale McBride, country singer, songwriter
- Terry McBride (McBride and the Ride), country singer, songwriter, son of Dale McBride
- Keith Null, former American football quarterback
- Stanley Walker, editor of New York Herald Tribune from 1928 to 1935
- Clayton Tucker, Texas Agriculture Commissioner

== Education ==
The city of Lampasas is served by the Lampasas Independent School District.

== References in pop culture ==
"Lampasas, Texas" is the title of the second episode of the CBS Western television series Trackdown, starring Robert Culp as Texas Ranger Hoby Gilman. The episode aired on October 11, 1957. In the story line, Gilman tries to block a town from carrying out the legal lynching of an innocent man.
