= Holly Dunn discography =

- Studio albums: 9
- Compilation albums: 1
- Singles: 26
- Music videos: 12

The discography of American country music artist Holly Dunn contains nine studio albums, one compilation album, 26 singles and 12 music videos. Originally a songwriter for MTM Records, she signed with the same label as a recording artist in 1985. Her debut single was 1985's "Praying for Keeps", which became a minor hit. In the same year she issued her self-titled debut album, her single "Daddy's Hands" became a major hit. The single peaked at number 7 on the Billboard Hot Country Songs chart. In 1987, her second album Cornerstone was issued. The record spawned three top ten country hits: "Love Someone Like Me", "Only When I Love" and "Strangers Again".

Her third studio album, Across the Rio Grande (1988), reached number 26 on the Billboard Top Country Albums chart. Among its singles was "That's What Your Love Does to Me", which became a top ten hit. In 1989, Dunn switched to Warner Bros. Records where she issued The Blue Rose of Texas. The album spawned the number one hit "Are You Ever Gonna Love Me". In 1990, she released her fifth studio record entitled Heart Full of Love. It spawned her second number one single, "You Really Had Me Going".

In 1991, her first compilation album was released entitled Milestones: Greatest Hits, which peaked at number 25 on the Billboard country albums chart. The album spawned two minor hits, including "Maybe I Mean Yes". Her final album with Warner Bros. appeared in 1992, Getting It Dunn, which did not reach any Billboard chart positions. In 1995, she returned with her seventh studio release, Life and Love and All the Stages. Its lead single, "I Am Who I Am", was her final chart appearance, reaching number 56 on the country singles chart. Her final studio album issued was a gospel record entitled Full Circle (2003).

== Albums ==
=== Studio albums ===
List of studio albums, with selected chart positions, and other relevant details
Title	Album details	Peak chart positions
Title	Album details	US Country
Holly Dunn	Released: May 1986; Label: MTM; Formats: LP, cassette, CD	29
Cornerstone	Released: May 1987; Label: MTM; Formats: LP, cassette, CD	22
Across the Rio Grande	Released: June 1988; Label: MTM; Formats: LP, cassette, CD	26
The Blue Rose of Texas	Released: July 10, 1989; Label: Warner Bros.; Formats: LP, cassette, CD	30
Heart Full of Love	Released: May 10, 1990; Label: Warner Bros.; Formats: Cassette, CD	47
Getting It Dunn	Released: June 16, 1992; Label: Warner Bros.; Formats: Cassette, CD	—
Life and Love and All the Stages	Released: April 18, 1995; Label: River North; Formats: Cassette, CD	—
Leave One Bridge Standing	Released: April 8, 1997; Label: River North; Formats: Cassette, CD	—
Full Circle	Released: June 2003; Label: OMS; Formats: CD	—
"—" denotes a recording that did not chart or was not released in that territory.

=== Compilation albums ===
List of studio albums, with selected chart positions, and other relevant details
Title	Album details	Peak chart positions		Certifications (sales thresholds)
Title	Album details	US	US Country	Certifications (sales thresholds)
Milestones: Greatest Hits	Released: July 23, 1991; Label: Warner Bros.; Formats: Cassette, CD	162	25	RIAA: Gold

== Singles ==
=== As lead artist ===
List of singles, with selected chart positions, and other relevant details
Title	Year	Peak chart positions		Album
Title	Year	US Country	CAN Country	Album
"Playing for Keeps"	1985	62	—	Non-album single
"My Heart Holds On"	1985	64	—	Holly Dunn
"Two Too Many"	1986	39	—	Holly Dunn
"Daddy's Hands"	1986	7	—	Holly Dunn
"Love Someone Like Me"	1987	2	2	Cornerstone
"Only When I Love"	1987	4	7	Cornerstone
"Strangers Again"	1987	7	36	Cornerstone
"That's What Your Love Does to Me"	1988	5	6	Across the Rio Grande
"(It's Always Gonna Be) Someday"	1988	11	13	Across the Rio Grande
"Are You Ever Gonna Love Me"	1989	1	8	The Blue Rose of Texas
"There Goes My Heart Again"	1989	4	8	The Blue Rose of Texas
"My Anniversary for Being a Fool"	1990	63	75	Heart Full of Love
"You Really Had Me Going"	1990	1	1	Heart Full of Love
"Heart Full of Love"	1990	19	12	Heart Full of Love
"Maybe I Mean Yes"	1991	48	45	Milestones: Greatest Hits
"No One Takes the Train Anymore"	1991	—	—	Milestones: Greatest Hits
"No Love Have I"	1992	67	—	Getting It Dunn
"As Long as You Belong to Me"	1992	68	—	Getting It Dunn
"Golden Years"	1992	51	62	Getting It Dunn
"I Am Who I Am"	1995	56	56	Life and Love and All the Stages
"Cowboys Are My Weakness"	1995	—	—	Life and Love and All the Stages
"It's Not About Blame"	1995	—	—	Life and Love and All the Stages
"Leave One Bridge Standing"	1997	—	—	Leave One Bridge Standing
"—" denotes a recording that did not chart or was not released in that territory.

=== As a featured artist ===
List of singles, with selected chart positions, and other relevant details
Title	Year	Peak chart positions		Album
Title	Year	US Country	CAN Country	Album
"A Face in the Crowd" (with Michael Martin Murphey with Holly Dunn)	1987	4	7	Americana
"Maybe" (Kenny Rogers with Holly Dunn)	1990	25	17	Something Inside So Strong
"Tomorrow's World" (Note: Multi-artist collaboration featuring Lynn Anderson, Butch Baker, Shane Barmby, Billy Hill, Suzy Bogguss, Kix Brooks, T. Graham Brown, The Burch Sisters, Holly Dunn, Foster & Lloyd, Vince Gill, William Lee Golden, Highway 101, Shelby Lynne, Johnny Rodriguez, Dan Seals, Les Taylor, Pam Tillis, Mac Wiseman, and Kevin Welch.)	1990	74	—	Non-album single
"—" denotes a recording that did not chart or was not released in that territory.

== Videography ==
=== Video albums ===
Title	Details
Milestones: Greatest Hits	Released: 1991; Label: Warner Bros. Records; Formats: VHS

=== Music videos ===
List of music videos, showing year released and director
Title	Year	Director(s)	Ref.
"Two Too Many"	1986	Coke Sams	
"Daddy's Hands"	1986	Jim May, Coke Cams	
"Strangers Again"	1988	Coke Sams	
"There Goes My Heart Again" (Live)	1989		
"You Really Had Me Going"	1990	Charley Randazzo	
"Maybe I Mean Yes"	1991	Clarke Sullivan	
"No One Takes the Train Anymore"	1991	Clarke Sullivan	
"As Long as You Belong to Me"	1992	Roger Pistole	
"I Am Who I Am"	1995	Thom Oliphant	
"Cowboys Are My Weakness"	1995	Thom Oliphant	
"Leave One Bridge Standing"	1997	Steven R. Monroe	
