= Milestones: Greatest Hits =

Greatest hits album by Holly Dunn
- Released: July 23, 1991
- Genre: Country
- Length: 35:36
- Label: Warner Bros. Nashville
- Producer: Dunn; Chris Waters

Holly Dunn chronology
Heart Full of Love (1990)	Milestones: Greatest Hits (1991)	Getting It Dunn (1992)

Professional ratings
Review scores
Source	Rating
Allmusic	4.5/5 stars

Milestones: Greatest Hits is a compilation album by American country music singer-songwriter Holly Dunn. It was released by Warner Bros. Nashville in July 1991.

Milestones contains eleven songs, all but one of which are previously released. Five of them, including Dunn's self-penned well-beloved hit "Daddy's Hands", were originally released in the late 1980s by independent label MTM Records. Four more, including her two #1 country hits "Are You Ever Gonna Love Me" and "You Really Had Me Going", were originally put out by Warner Bros. Nashville, which signed Dunn after MTM closed its doors in late 1988 and acquired her MTM masters. In addition, "A Face in the Crowd" — a duet with Michael Martin Murphey that appeared in the latter's thirteenth studio album Americana (1987), also released by Warner Bros. — and the controversial "Maybe I Mean Yes", a brand-new song, also make their appearances in Milestones.

Two singles were released from the album: "Maybe I Mean Yes" and "No One Takes the Train Anymore", which was previously an album track from Dunn's fourth studio album The Blue Rose of Texas (1989). The former peaked at #48 on the Billboard Hot Country Singles & Tracks chart.

Milestones peaked at #25 on the Top Country Albums chart and #162 on the Billboard 200 and was certified Gold by the Recording Industry Association of America.

== Track listing ==
No.	Title	Writer(s)	Producer(s)	Length
1.	"Daddy's Hands" (from Holly Dunn, 1986)	Holly Dunn	Tommy West	3:28
2.	"Only When I Love" (from Cornerstone, 1987)	Dunn, Tom Shapiro, Chris Waters	West	3:32
3.	"(It's Always Gonna Be) Someday" (from Across the Rio Grande, 1988)	Dunn, Shapiro, Waters	Dunn, Warren Peterson, Waters	2:58
4.	"Love Someone Like Me" (from Cornerstone, 1987)	Dunn, Radney Foster	West	3:14
5.	"A Face in the Crowd" (with Michael Martin Murphey; from Americana, 1987)	Gary Harrison, Karen Staley	Steve Gibson, Jim Ed Norman	4:09
6.	"Strangers Again" (from Cornerstone, 1987)	Dunn, Waters	West	3:14
7.	"Maybe I Mean Yes" (previously unreleased)	Dunn, Shapiro, Waters	Dunn, Waters	2:59
8.	"There Goes My Heart Again" (from The Blue Rose of Texas, 1989)	Joe Diffie, Wayne Perry, Lonnie Wilson	Dunn, Waters	2:42
9.	"Are You Ever Gonna Love Me" (from The Blue Rose of Texas, 1989)	Dunn, Shapiro, Waters	Dunn, Waters	2:40
10.	"No One Takes the Train Anymore" (from The Blue Rose of Texas, 1989)	Waters	Dunn, Waters	4:11
11.	"You Really Had Me Going" (from Heart Full of Love, 1990)	Dunn, Shapiro, Waters	Dunn, Waters	2:47

== Personnel ==
- Eddie Bayers – drums
- Pete Bordonali – acoustic guitar, electric guitar
- Mike Brignardello – bass guitar
- Dennis Burnside – keyboards
- Larry Byrom – acoustic guitar
- Mark Casstevens – acoustic guitar
- Beth Nielsen Chapman – background vocals
- Joe Diffie – background vocals
- Holly Dunn – lead vocals, background vocals
- Paul Franklin – steel guitar
- Sonny Garrish – steel guitar
- Steve Gibson – banjo, dobro, acoustic guitar, electric guitar
- Jon Goin – electric guitar
- Rob Hajacos – fiddle
- David Hoffner – keyboards
- Bill Hullet – acoustic guitar, electric guitar
- Roy Huskey Jr. – upright bass
- Tony King – background vocals
- Chris Leuzinger – acoustic guitar, electric guitar
- Bill Lloyd – acoustic guitar
- Larrie Londin – drums
- Terry McMillan – harmonica
- Brent Mason – electric guitar
- Michael Martin Murphey – duet vocals on "A Face in the Crowd"
- Mark O'Connor – fiddle
- Don Potter – acoustic guitar
- Tom Robb – bass guitar
- Brent Rowan – electric guitar
- Steve Schaffer – bass guitar
- Gary Smith – keyboards
- James Stroud – drums
- Chris Waters – acoustic guitar, background vocals
- Biff Watson – acoustic guitar, keyboards
- Tommy Wells – drums
- Dennis Wilson – background vocals
- Lonnie Wilson – drums, background vocals
- Glenn Worf – bass guitar
- Curtis Young – background vocals

== Chart performance ==
Chart (1991)	Peak position
U.S. Billboard Top Country Albums	25
U.S. Billboard 200	162
