= The People Next Door =

The People Next Door may refer to:

== Film and television ==
- "The People Next Door", Season 7, Episode 33 of Kraft Television Theatre
- "The People Next Door" (CBS Playhouse), an American CBS Playhouse production
- The People Next Door (1970 film), an American drama directed by David Greene
- "The People Next Door", Season 4, Episode 8 of Highway to Heaven
- The People Next Door (1996 film), an American crime drama television film starring Faye Dunaway
- The People Next Door (Australian TV series), a 1973 comedy-drama series
- The People Next Door (American TV series), a 1989 sitcom

== Literature ==
- The People Next Door: An Interpretive History of Mexico and the Mexicans, a 1926 non-fiction book by George Creel
- The People Next Door, a 2008 novel by Roisin Meaney
- The People Next Door, a 2017 non-fiction book by TCA Raghavan
- The People Next Door, a fictional television series in Therapy, a 1995 book by David Lodge

== Other uses ==
- The People Next Door, a 2003 stage play by Henry Adam

== See also ==
- Boy Next Door (disambiguation)
- Girl Next Door (disambiguation)
- The House Next Door (disambiguation)
- The Family Next Door (disambiguation)
- The Man Next Door (disambiguation)
- The Woman Next Door (disambiguation)
