= Next Door =

Next Door may refer to:

== Film ==
- Next Door (1975 film), a short film adaptation of a story by Kurt Vonnegut (see below)
- Next Door, a 1990 animated short film by Pete Docter
- Next Door (1994 film), an American black comedy TV movie
- Next Door (2005 film) (Naboer), a Norwegian psychological thriller
- Next Door (2021 film), a German black comedy-drama film

== Other uses ==
- "Next Door", a 1955 short story by Kurt Vonnegut
- Next Door, a 1983 EP by Boy, a band featuring Freddy Moore
- Next Door, an American convenience store chain owned by GPM Investments
- Nextdoor, a social networking service

== See also ==
- Two Doors Down (disambiguation)
- 3 Doors Down (disambiguation)
- Next (disambiguation)
- Neighbor (disambiguation)
- Boy Next Door (disambiguation)
- Girl Next Door (disambiguation)
