= That's What Your Love Does to Me =

Single by Holly Dunn

from the album Across the Rio Grande
- B-side: "Lonesome Highway"
- Released: June 25, 1988
- Genre: Country
- Length: 2:46
- Label: MTM
- Songwriter(s): Chick Rains, Bill Caswell
- Producer(s): Holly Dunn, Warren Peterson, Chris Waters

Holly Dunn singles chronology
"Strangers Again" (1988)	"That's What Your Love Does to Me" (1988)	"(It's Always Gonna Be) Someday" (1988)

"That's What Your Love Does to Me" is a song written by Chick Rains and Bill Caswell, and recorded by American country music artist Holly Dunn. It was released in June 1988 as the first single from the album Across the Rio Grande. The song reached #5 on the Billboard Hot Country Singles & Tracks chart.

== Other versions ==
- Michael Johnson originally recorded the song on his 1986 album Wings.
- The song was also recorded by The Forester Sisters on their 1987 album You Again.

== Charts ==
=== Weekly charts ===
Chart (1988)	Peak position
US Hot Country Songs (Billboard)	5
Canadian RPM Country Tracks	6

=== Year-end charts ===
Chart (1988)	Position
US Hot Country Songs (Billboard)	61
