= 3 Doors Down (disambiguation) =

3 Doors Down is an American rock band.

3 Doors Down may refer to:

- 3 Doors Down (album), 2008 eponymous album by 3 Doors Down
- 3 Doors Down Café and Lounge, an Italian restaurant in Portland, Oregon, US

== See also ==
- Two Doors Down (disambiguation)
- Next Door (disambiguation)
