= Judy (Judy Rodman album) =

Studio album by Judy Rodman
- Released: 1986
- Genre: Country
- Label: MTM
- Producer: Tommy West

Judy Rodman chronology
Judy (1986)	A Place Called Love (1987)

Singles from Judy
- 1. "I've Been Had by Love Before" Released: 1985; 2. "You're Gonna Miss Me When I'm Gone" Released: 1985; 3. "I Sure Need Your Lovin'" Released: 1986; 4. "Until I Met You" Released: 1986; 5. "She Thinks That She'll Marry" Released: 1987

Professional ratings
Review scores
Source	Rating
Allmusic	4/5 stars

Judy is the debut studio album of American country music artist. Judy Rodman. It was released by MTM Records in 1986. The album contained five singles that were released between 1985 and 1986, including the number one hit "Until I Met You."

== Background ==
After signing with MTM Records in 1985, Rodman released her first three singles between 1985 and 1986. It wasn't until 1986, when Rodman's fourth single, "Until I Met You" became a major hit (reaching #1 on the Hot Country Songs chart) that MTM released this debut album. It contains the four singles issued by Rodman between 1985 and 1986, including "Until I Met You." In addition, a fifth single was spawned from the album, "She Thinks That's She'll Marry", which placed in the Country Top 10 in 1987. "Come Next Monday" was later a Number One hit in 1990 for K.T. Oslin, who co-wrote it.

The album received a positive review from Allmusic, giving the album four out of five stars. Judy peaked at #23 on Top Country Albums chart after it release in 1986; it was her highest-peaking album on that chart.

== Track listing ==
No.	Title	Writer(s)	Length
1.	"I've Been Had by Love Before"	Tom Damphier	3:16
2.	"Until I Met You"	Hank Riddle	3:48
3.	"Do You Make Love as Well as You Make Music"	Judy Rodman	3:44
4.	"Our Love Is Fine"	Mike Ragogna	3:31
5.	"Over and Out"	Gary Burr	3:12
6.	"You're Gonna Miss Me When I'm Gone"	Hugh Prestwood	3:17
7.	"He's All I'll Ever Need"	Jesse Winchester	2:59
8.	"She Thinks That She'll Marry"	Rodman, DeWayne Orender	3:26
9.	"I Sure Need Your Lovin'"	Billy Aerts, Rodman	2:26
10.	"Come Next Monday"	Rory Bourke, Charlie Black, K. T. Oslin	2:50

== Chart performance ==
=== Album ===
Chart (1986)	Peak position
U.S. Billboard Top Country Albums	23

=== Singles ===
Year	Single	Peak positions
Year	Single	US Country
1985	"I've Been Had by Love Before"	40
1985	"You're Gonna Miss Me When I'm Gone"	33
1986	"I Sure Need Your Lovin'"	30
1986	"Until I Met You"	1
1987	"She Thinks That She'll Marry"	9
