= Terry Radigan =

American country music singer

- Born: Brooklyn, New York, U.S.
- Origin: Nashville, Tennessee, U.S.
- Genres: Country
- Occupation: Singer-songwriter
- Instruments: Vocals, guitar
- Years active: 1980s-present
- Labels: Asylum, Vanguard
- Formerly of: Grace Pool

Terry Radigan is an American country music singer. She has recorded one unreleased album for Asylum Records, and one album for Vanguard Records.

== Biography ==
Radigan was born in Brooklyn, New York. At age four, she was raised by her grandparents after her mother was diagnosed with cancer. In high school, Radigan formed her own band and performed in local clubs. Before beginning her country career, Radigan was guitarist in the band Grace Pool.

She released her debut single "Half a Million Teardrops" via Asylum Records in March 1995. The single was reviewed favorably by Billboard, which praised the "dreamy-but-gritty vocal" and compared Radigan favorably to Emmylou Harris, whose former producer, Brian Ahern, produced the track. Wally Wilson and Mike Henderson wrote the song, which was originally recorded by Holly Dunn on her 1992 album Getting It Dunn. The single was to have been included on an album titled Pawnbroker's Daughter, which was never released. It would have included seven songs that Radigan wrote, plus covers of Eric Carmen's "Never Gonna Fall in Love Again" and Bruce Springsteen's "Two Faces".

After leaving Asylum, Radigan wrote album tracks for Trisha Yearwood, Patty Loveless, and Trick Pony. On May 16, 2000, she released the album Radigan through Vanguard Records. She co-produced the album with Justin Niebank and guitarist Kenny Greenberg. People magazine reviewed Radigan favorably, praising Radigan's lyrics and her rendition of "When It Comes to You".

== Discography ==
=== Albums ===
Title	Album details
Radigan	Release date: May 16, 2000; Label: Vanguard Records; Format: CD

=== Singles ===
Year	Single	Album
1995	"Half a Million Teardrops"	Pawnbroker's Daughter (unreleased)

=== Music videos ===
Year	Video	Director
1995	"Half a Million Teardrops"	Pete DeLasho
