= Girls Ride Horses Too =

Single by Judy Rodman

from the album A Place Called Love
- B-side: "Heart of a Gentleman"
- Released: February 1987
- Genre: Country
- Length: 3:30
- Label: MTM
- Songwriter(s): Alice Randall, Mark D. Sanders
- Producer(s): Tommy West

Judy Rodman singles chronology
"She Thinks That She'll Marry" (1986)	"Girls Ride Horses Too" (1987)	"I'll Be Your Baby Tonight" (1987)

"Girls Ride Horses Too" is a song recorded by American country music artist Judy Rodman. It was released in February 1987 as the first single from the album A Place Called Love. The song reached #7 on the Billboard Hot Country Singles & Tracks chart. The song was written by Alice Randall and Mark D. Sanders. The "B Side" of this single does not appear on any LP.

== Chart performance ==
Chart (1987)	Peak position
US Hot Country Songs (Billboard)	7
Canadian RPM Country Tracks	10
