= A Place Called Love (Judy Rodman album) =

Studio album by Judy Rodman
- Released: 1987
- Genre: Country
- Label: MTM
- Producer: Tommy West

Judy Rodman chronology
Judy (1986)	A Place Called Love (1987)

Singles from A Place Called Love
- 1. "Girls Ride Horses Too" Released: 1987; 2. "I'll Be Your Baby Tonight" Released: 1987; 3. "I Want a Love Like That" Released: 1988

Professional ratings
Review scores
Source	Rating
Allmusic	3/5 stars

A Place Called Love is the second studio album by American country music artist Judy Rodman. It was issued under MTM Records in 1987, and was the final studio album Rodman would issue during her music career.

== Background ==
A Place Called Love was the second issued album Rodman made under MTM. It spawned three singles that each became major hits on the Billboard Country Chart. The first single, "Girls Ride Horses Too" reached the Top 10, as well as the second single, "I'll Be Your Baby Tonight" (a cover of the Bob Dylan song). The third single, "I Want a Love Like That" peaked within the Top 20, becoming her last Top 40 entry. The album was issued in 1987 following her previous album the year before entitled, Judy.

A Place Called Love peaked at #29 on the Top Country Albums chart following its release in 1987. The album was reviewed by Allmusic, who gave it three out of five stars. This was only one of two albums that Rodman would issue during her music career. Her third album, Goin' to Work was expected to be released in 1988, but was not released due to the label's closure.

== Track listing ==
No.	Title	Writer(s)	Length
1.	"A Place Called Love"	Judy Rodman, Tony Marty	2:43
2.	"I'll Be Your Baby Tonight"	Bob Dylan	3:20
3.	"I Want a Love Like That"	Thom Schuyler, Janis Ian	4:48
4.	"Girls Ride Horses Too"	Alice Randall, Mark D. Sanders	3:36
5.	"That Was Then, This is Now"	Hugh Prestwood	3:58
6.	"Early Fall"	Rodman, Dewayne Orender	4:47
7.	"What's a Broken Heart"	Pat Bunch, Pam Rose, Mary Ann Kennedy	3:17
8.	"Please Don't Take My Heart"	Rodman	4:15
9.	"Love Is a Winding Road"	Lisa Palas, Lisa Silver, Sanders	4:07
10.	"Love Comes from Inside of You"	Rodman, Casey Kelly	2:29

== Personnel ==
- George Binkley — violin
- Pete Bordonali —electric guitar, mandolin
- John Borg — viola
- Mark Casstevens — acoustic guitar
- Roy Christensen — viola, cello
- David Davidson — violin
- Al Delroy — strings arranger, conductor
- Sonny Garrish — pedal steel guitar
- Steve Gibson — acoustic guitar
- John Goin — acoustic guitar
- Carl Gorodetzky — violin
- Shane Keister — keyboards
- Janis Ian — background vocals
- Mary Ann Kennedy — background vocals
- Lee Larrison — violin
- Larrie Londin — drums
- Ted Madsen — violin
- Phyllis Mazza — violin
- Peter McHugh — violin
- Dennis Molchan — violin
- Farrell Morris — percussion
- Mark O'Connor — fiddle
- Judy Rodman — lead vocals, guitar
- Pam Rose — background vocals
- Brent Rowan — acoustic guitar
- Steve Schaffer — bass
- Thom Schuyler — background vocals
- Lisa Silver — background vocals
- Pamela Sixfin — violin
- James Stroud — drums
- Wendy Suits — background vocals
- Bobby Taylor — oboe
- Bergan White — strings arranger, conductor
- Tommy West — producer, guitar, background vocals

== Chart performance ==
=== Album ===
Chart (1987)	Peak position
U.S. Billboard Top Country Albums	29

=== Singles ===
Year	Single	Peak positions	
Year	Single	US Country	CAN Country
1987	"Girls Ride Horses Too"	7	10
1987	"I'll Be Your Baby Tonight"	5	9
1988	"I Want a Love Like That"	18	41
