= Tonight We Ride =

Studio album by Michael Martin Murphey
- Released: 1986
- Genre: Country
- Length: 40:54
- Label: Warner Bros.
- Producer: Jim Ed Norman

Michael Martin Murphey chronology
The Best of Michael Martin Murphey (1984)	Tonight We Ride (1986)	Americana (1987)

Singles from Tonight We Ride
- 1. "Rollin' Nowhere" Released: May 12, 1986; 2. "Fiddlin' Man" Released: August 30, 1986

Professional ratings
Review scores
Source	Rating
Allmusic	2.5/5 stars

Tonight We Ride is the twelfth studio album by American singer-songwriter Michael Martin Murphey and his first for Warner Bros. Records. Released in 1986, the album was produced by Jim Ed Norman and contains guest performances by Holly Dunn, Reggie Young, Mark O'Connor, Charlie McCoy, and JD Souther. The album's title track was also its first single. The album peaked at number 46 on the Billboard Top Country Albums chart.

== Track listing ==
No.	Title	Writer(s)	Length
1.	"Tonight We Ride"	Michael Martin Murphey, Jim Ed Norman	3:42
2.	"Rollin' Nowhere"	Murphey	2:53
3.	"Innocent Hearts"	Murphey	4:18
4.	"Close to My Heart"	Murphey, Norman	3:40
5.	"Face-to-Face with the Night"	Murphey	4:05
6.	"Building Bridges"	Murphey, Chick Rains	3:10
7.	"Fiddlin' Man"	Murphey	4:44
8.	"I'll Break Out Again Tonight"	A.L. "Doodle" Owens, Sanger D. Shafer	3:28
9.	"The One That Got Away"	Murphey, David Hoffner, Sonny Throckmorton	3:51
10.	"Santa Fe Cantina"	Murphey, Rains	3:52
11.	"Ghost Town (Message from the Ghost Ranch)"	Murphey	3:11

== Credits ==
Music

- Michael Martin Murphey – lead vocals, guitar, banjo
- Fred Carter Jr. – guitar
- Paul Worley – guitar
- Steve Gibson – guitar
- Reggie Young – electric guitar
- Josh Leo – guitar, mandolin
- Sonny Garrish – steel guitar
- Carmen Acciaioli – steel guitar
- Buddy Emmons – steel guitar
- Mitch Humphries – piano, synthesizer
- Barry Beckett – piano
- Dennis Burnside – piano, synthesizer
- John Jarvis – piano, synthesizer
- David Hoffner – synthesizer, piano
- Mark O'Connor – fiddle
- Charlie McCoy – harmonica
- Michael Rhodes – bass
- Michael Bowden – bass
- Eddie Bayers – drums
- Pam Tillis – vocals
- JD Souther – background vocals
- Gary Pigg – background vocals
- Robb Strandlund – background vocals
- Thomas Flora – background vocals
- Sonny Throckmorton – background vocals
- Michael Lund – background vocals

Production

- Nick DeCaro – arranger
- Bergen White – arranger
- Scott Hendricks – engineer
- Chris Hammond – assistant engineer
- Eric Prestidge – engineer, mastering, mixing
- Lee Groizsch – assistant engineer, mixing assistant
- Glenn Meadows – mastering
- Kurt Markus – photography
- W.C. Matthews – design

== Chart performance ==
Chart (1986)	Peak position
U.S. Billboard Top Country Albums	46
