= Across the Rio Grande =

Across the Rio Grande may refer to:

- Across the Rio Grande (album), a 1988 album by Holly Dunn
- Across the Rio Grande (film), a 1949 American western film
