= A Place Called Love =

A Place Called Love may refer to:

- A Place Called Love (Judy Rodman album), 1987
- A Place Called Love (Johnny Reid album), 2010
