= Girl Next Door =

Girl Next Door, or variants, may refer to:

- Girl next door, a young female stock character who is often used in romantic stories

== Film ==
- The Girl Next Door (1953 film), American musical comedy
- The Girl Next Door (2004 film), American romantic comedy
- The Girl Next Door (2007 film), American horror drama, based on Ketchum's novel
- The Girl Next Door, 1998 television film starring Tracey Gold
- The Girl Next Door, 1999 documentary featuring porn star Stacy Valentine
- The Girl Next Door, 1999 TV drama starring Henry Czerny and Polly Shannon

== Television ==
=== Episodes ===
- "The Girl Next Door" (Veronica Mars) (2004 episode)
- "Girl Next Door", Monster Farm episode 7a (1998)
- "Girls Next Door", 60 Days In season 6, episode 13 (2020)
- "The Girl Next Door", 21 Jump Street season 5, episode 8 (1990)
- "The Girl Next Door", 3 Roses episode 1 (2021)
- "The Girl Next Door", Bringing Up Buddy episode 2 (1960)
- "The Girl Next Door", Homicide Hunter season 8, episode 4 (2018)
- "The Girl Next Door", Hunter season 3, episode 16 (1987)
- "The Girl Next Door", Kirstie episode 5 (2014)
- "The Girl Next Door", Less than Perfect season 2, episode 10 (2003)
- "The Girl Next Door", Phua Chu Kang Pte Ltd season 5, episode 13 (2003)
- "The Girl Next Door", Second Chance episode 15 (1988)
- "The Girl Next Door", Stalked: Someone's Watching season 2, episode 10 (2012)
- "The Girl Next Door", Supernatural season 7, episode 3 (2011)
- "The Girl Next Door", The First 48 season 19, episode 11 (2018)
- "The Girl Next Door", The Love Boat season 4, episode 12c (1981)
- "The Girl Next Door", The Mindy Project season 2, episode 21 (2014)
- "The Girl Next Door", The Sentinel season 3, episode 3 (1997)
- "The Girl Next Door", The Upper Hand season 4, episode 5 (1992)
- "The Girls Next Door", My Three Sons season 2, episode 18 (1962)

=== Shows ===
- The Girls Next Door, an American reality TV series
- Girl Next Door (anime), a 2000 Japanese erotic original video animation based on the video game of the same name
- The Girl Next Door, a web series of The Office American TV series

== Literature ==
- The Girl Next Door (Ketchum novel), 1989 novel by Jack Ketchum
- The Girl Next Door (Rendell novel), 2014 novel by Ruth Rendell
- Flicka, Ricka, Dicka and the Girl Next Door, a 1940 book in the Flicka, Ricka, Dicka series by Maj Lindman
- Girl Next Door, a 2005 autobiography by Anne Diamond
- Girl Next Door, a 2009 novel by Alyssa Brugman
- The Girl Next Door, a 1917 novel by Augusta Huiell Seaman
- The Girl Next Door, a 1919 novel by Ruby M. Ayres
- The Girl Next Door, a 1949 novel by Peggy Gaddis
- The Girl Next Door ...and How She Grew, a 1988 autobiography by Jane Powell
- The Girl Next Door, a 1995 novel by Trisha Alexander
- The Girl Next Door, a 2000 novel by Caroline Anderson
- The Girl Next Door, a 2001 novel by Kate Welsh
- The Girl Next Door, a 2009 novel by Elizabeth Noble
- The Girl Next Door, a 2012 novel by Brad Parks
- The Girls Next Door, a 2018 non-fiction book by Paul Ruditis, a tie-in to the TV series

== Music ==
- Girls Next Door, an American country music group
- Girl Next Door (band), a Japanese music trio
- Girls Next Door, a South Korean pop group in Idol Drama Operation Team

=== Albums ===
- The Girls Next Door (album), by Girls Next Door, 1986
- The Girl Next Door (album), by Evelyn King, 1989
- Girl Next Door (Girl Next Door album), 2008
- Girl Next Door (Saving Jane album), 2005

=== Songs ===
- "The Girl Next Door", a variant of the 1944 popular song "The Boy Next Door"
  - "The Girl Next Door", a song from the 1954 film Athena
- "Girl Next Door" (Musiq Soulchild song), 2001
- "Girl Next Door", 2003, a song by Merril Bainbridge
- "Girl Next Door" (Saving Jane song), 2005
- "Girl Next Door" (MGK and Wiz Khalifa song), 2026
- "Girl Next Door", a song by Alessia Cara from the 2018 album The Pains of Growing
- "Girl Next Door", a song by Bobby Brown from the 1986 album "King of Stage"
- "Girl Next Door", a song by Brandy Clark from the 2016 album Big Day in a Small Town
- "Girl Next Door", a song by Lee Matthews from the 2015 album It's a Great Day to Be Alive
- "Girl Next Door", a 2013 song by Massad
- "Girl Next Door", the theme song for My Babysitter's a Vampire, 2011
- "The Girl Next Door", a song by Screeching Weasel from the 1995 album Kill the Musicians
- "The Girls Next Door", a song from the 1995 Pat Metheny Group album We Live Here
- "Girl Next Door", a 2021 track by Toby Fox from Deltarune Chapter 2 OST from the video game Deltarune
- "Girl Next Door", a song by Trixie Mattel from the 2020 album Barbara

== See also ==
- Boy Next Door (disambiguation)
- The House Next Door (disambiguation)
- The Family Next Door (disambiguation)
- The Man Next Door (disambiguation)
- The Woman Next Door (disambiguation)
