= Slow Boat to China =

1986 single by Girls Next Door

Single by Girls Next Door

from the album The Girls Next Door
- B-side: "Pretty Boy's Cadillac"
- Released: May 1986
- Genre: Country
- Length: 3:26
- Label: MTM
- Songwriter: Mike Ragogna
- Producer: Tommy West

Girls Next Door singles chronology
"Love Will Get You Through Times with No Money" (1986)	"Slow Boat to China" (1986)	"Baby I Want It" (1986)

"Slow Boat to China" is a song written by Mike Ragogna and recorded by American country music group Girls Next Door. It was released in May 1986 as the second single from their album The Girls Next Door. The song peaked at No. 8 on the Billboard Hot Country Singles chart.

== Critical reception ==
An uncredited review in Cash Box magazine was favorable, saying that the group "entertains with their strong vocals and tight harmony. The easy-flowing melody should help the Girls’ new single sail into the Top 10, creating waves all along the way." A review from Billboard was also positive, calling the song "a brisk, pop-flavored effort."

== Chart performance ==
Chart (1986)	Peak position
U.S. Billboard Hot Country Singles	8
