= Until I Met You =

Single by Judy Rodman

from the album Judy
- B-side: "Do You Make Love as Well as You Make Music"
- Released: April 1986
- Genre: Country
- Length: 3:51
- Label: MTM
- Songwriter(s): Hank Riddle
- Producer(s): Tommy West

Judy Rodman singles chronology
"I Sure Need Your Lovin'" (1985)	"Until I Met You" (1986)	"She Thinks That She'll Marry" (1986)

"Until I Met You" is a song written by Hank Riddle and recorded by American country music artist Loretta Lynn for her 1980 album Lookin' Good.

American country music artist Judy Rodman recorded and released a version in April 1986 as the fourth single from her album Judy. The single was Rodman's fourth-issued single and her only song to reach number one on the Billboard Hot Country Songs chart.

== Content ==
"Until I Met You" is slow tempo country ballad written by American songwriter, Hank Riddle. The song explains how a woman's life and everything she had previously known has changed since she has met her lover. Midway and towards the end of the song, a bridge explains how the woman's life has changed:

Now the stars don't shine the same
Everything's in a state of change
Twilight I knew
Until I met you

== Chart performance ==
"Until I Met You" was released as Rodman's third official single, as well as her first single of 1986. The song peaked at number one on the Hot Country Songs the week of July 19, becoming Rodman's only single to reach the top spot during her career. In addition, the single also peaked at number one on the Cashbox, Gavin Report, and Radio & Records country charts that same year. From this hit, Rodman was officially able to release her debut album that year entitled, Judy that also included her hits from the previous year, as well as Rodman's next single, "She Thinks That She'll Marry."

Chart (1986)	Peak position
US Hot Country Songs (Billboard)	1
