= She Thinks That She'll Marry =

Single by Judy Rodman

from the album Judy
- B-side: "Our Love Is Fine"
- Released: October 1986
- Genre: Country
- Length: 3:40
- Label: MTM
- Songwriter(s): Judy Rodman, DeWayne Orender
- Producer(s): Tommy West

Judy Rodman singles chronology
"Until I Met You" (1986)	"She Thinks That She'll Marry" (1986)	"Girls Ride Horses Too" (1987)

"She Thinks That She'll Marry" is a song by American country music artist Judy Rodman. It was released in October 1986 as the fifth single from the album Judy and reached #9 on the Billboard Hot Country Singles & Tracks chart. The song was written by Rodman and DeWayne Orender.

== Chart performance ==
Chart (1986–1987)	Peak position
US Hot Country Songs (Billboard)	9
