= Kevin Bailey =

Kevin Bailey may refer to:

- Kevin Bailey (poet) (born 1954), British poet
- Kevin Bailey (politician), Texas state representative, 1991–2009
- Kevin Bailey, vocalist in The Shoppe
