= River of Time (Michael Martin Murphey album) =

Studio album by Michael Martin Murphey
- Released: March 8, 1988
- Recorded: 1987
- Genre: Country, cowboy music
- Length: 40:15
- Label: Warner Bros. Records
- Producer: Steve Gibson

Michael Martin Murphey chronology
Americana (1987)	River of Time (1988)	Land of Enchantment (1989)

Singles from River of Time
- 1. "I'm Gonna Miss You, Girl" Released: October 1987; 2. "Talkin' to the Wrong Man" Released: February 1988; 3. "Pilgrims on the Way (Matthew's Song)" Released: September 10, 1988; 4. "From the Word Go" Released: December 17, 1988

Professional ratings
Review scores
Source	Rating
Allmusic	4.5/5 stars

River of Time is the fourteenth studio album by American singer-songwriter Michael Martin Murphey. The album contains a newly recorded version of "What Am I Doing Hangin' 'Round?" and a duet with his son, Ryan Murphey, on "Talkin' to the Wrong Man" which reached number 4 on the Billboard Hot Country Singles chart in July 1988 and number 1 on the RPM Country Singles chart in Canada. River of Time peaked at number 11 on the Billboard Top Country Albums chart.

== Track listing ==
No.	Title	Writer(s)	Length
1.	"From the Word Go"	Michael Garvin, Chris Waters	3:13
2.	"Talkin' to the Wrong Man" (duet with Ryan Murphey)	Michael Martin Murphey	3:24
3.	"River of Time"	Susan Longacre, Dennis Robbins	4:51
4.	"Vanishing Breed"	M. Murphey, David Hoffner	4:23
5.	"Pilgrims on the Way (Matthew's Song)"	Marcus Hummon	4:04
6.	"The Running Blood"	M. Murphey, Hoffner	4:28
7.	"Children of the Wild World"	Jamie O'Hara	4:48
8.	"I'm Gonna Miss You, Girl"	Jesse Winchester	3:51
9.	"What Am I Doing Hangin' 'Round?"	M. Murphey, Owen Castleman	3:16
10.	"Still Got the Fire"	M. Murphey, Steve Gibson	3:57

== Personnel ==
Music

- Michael Martin Murphey – lead vocals
- Steve Gibson – acoustic guitar, electric guitar
- Larry Byrom – acoustic guitar
- Mark Casstevens – acoustic guitar
- Paul Franklin – steel guitar
- Jerry Douglas – dobro
- Mark O'Connor – fiddle
- Mike Lawler – synthesizer
- Charlie McCoy – harmonica
- Gove Scrivenor – autoharp
- Dennis Burnside – keyboards, string arrangements on "I'm Gonna Miss You, Girl"
- David Hoffner – synthesizer
- Michael Rhodes – bass guitar
- Mike Brignardello – bass guitar
- James Stroud – drums
- Eddie Bayers – drums
- Monroe Jones – drum programming on "Pilgrims on the Way"
- Ryan Murphey – duet vocals on "Talkin' to the Wrong Man"
- Wayne Kirkpatrick – background vocals
- Chris Harris – backing vocals
- Gary Janney – backing vocals
- Take 6 – backing vocals
- Dennis Wilson – backing vocals
- Dan Keen – backing vocals
- The Nashville String Machine – strings on "I'm Gonna Miss You, Girl"

Production

- Ken Suesov – engineer
- Bruce Albertine – engineer
- Lee Groitasch – assistant engineer
- Carry Summers – assistant engineer
- Bob Wright – assistant engineer
- Marshall Morgan – engineer, mixing
- Denny Purcell – mastering
- Charles Collins – artwork, photography

== Chart performance ==
Chart (1988)	Peak position
U.S. Billboard Top Country Albums	11
