= From the Word Go (song) =

1988 single by Michael Martin Murphey

Single by Michael Martin Murphey

from the album River of Time
- B-side: "Vanishing Breed"
- Released: December 17, 1988
- Genre: Country
- Length: 3:13
- Label: Warner Bros.
- Songwriter(s): Michael Garvin, Chris Waters
- Producer(s): Steve Gibson

Michael Martin Murphey singles chronology
"Pilgrims on the Way (Matthew's Song)" (1988)	"From the Word Go" (1988)	"Never Givin' Up on Love" (1989)

"From the Word Go" is a song written by Michael Garvin and Chris Waters, and recorded by American country music artist Michael Martin Murphey. It was released in December 1988 as the fourth and final single from the album River of Time. The song peaked at number 3 on the U.S. Billboard Hot Country Singles chart.

== Chart performance ==
Chart (1988–1989)	Peak position
US Hot Country Songs (Billboard)	3
Canadian RPM Country Tracks	2

=== Year-end charts ===
Chart (1989)	Position
Canada Country Tracks (RPM)	53
US Country Songs (Billboard)	44
