= Cornerstone (Holly Dunn album) =

Studio album by Holly Dunn
- Released: 1987
- Genre: Country
- Label: MTM
- Producer: Tommy West

Holly Dunn chronology
Holly Dunn (1986)	Cornerstone (1987)	Across the Rio Grande (1988)

Singles from Cornerstone
- 1. "Love Someone Like Me" Released: May 2, 1987; 2. "Only When I Love" Released: August 29, 1987; 3. "Strangers Again" Released: January 16, 1988

Professional ratings
Review scores
Source	Rating
Allmusic	3/5 stars

Cornerstone is the second studio album by American country music artist Holly Dunn, released in 1987. Although it yielded no number 1 hits, as would some of her later albums, Cornerstone would attain the highest Billboard Top Country Albums rating in her career for Holly Dunn at number 22, based on three hits which made it into the Country Top Ten singles list: the number 2 "Love Someone Like Me," the number 4 "Only When I Love," and the number 7 "Strangers Again."

== Track listing ==
No.	Title	Writer(s)	Length
1.	"Cornerstone"	Dave Loggins, Don Schlitz	3:46
2.	"Small Towns (Are Smaller for Girls)"	Mark D. Sanders, Alice Randall, Verlon Thompson	3:10
3.	"Strangers Again"	Holly Dunn, Chris Waters	3:08
4.	"Only When I Love"	Dunn, Waters, Tom Shapiro	3:30
5.	"Fewer Threads Than These"	Bucky Jones, Kevin Welch, Gary Nicholson	2:58
6.	"Love Someone Like Me"	Dunn, Radney Foster	3:09
7.	"Lover's Cross"	Jim Croce	3:34
8.	"Why Wyoming"	Waters, Shapiro, Kix Brooks	4:20
9.	"Wrap Me Up"	Dunn, Foster	3:02
10.	"Little Frame House"	Dunn	2:43

== Chart performance ==
Chart (1987)	Peak position
U.S. Billboard Top Country Albums	22
