= The Girls Next Door (album) =

1986 studio album by Girls Next Door

Studio album by Girls Next Door
- Released: 1986
- Studio: Sound Stage, Emerald Sound Stage III, Master Mix, Nashville, Tennessee
- Genre: Country
- Label: MTM
- Producer: Tommy West

Girls Next Door chronology
The Girls Next Door (1986)	What a Girl Next Door Could Do (1987)

The Girls Next Door is the debut album of American country music group Girls Next Door. It was released in 1986 through MTM Records.

== Content ==
The Girls Next Door accounted for four singles on the Billboard Hot Country Songs charts. First was "Love Will Get You Through Times of No Money" at number fourteen, followed by the group's most successful single "Slow Boat to China" at number eight. After this were "Baby I Want It" at number 26 and "Walk Me in the Rain" at number 28.

== Critical reception ==
Jim Lewis of United Press International praised the group's vocal harmony, as well as the lyrics of "Love Will Get You Through Times of No Money".

== Track listing ==
1. "Made in America" (Mike Ragogna) - 3:07
2. "Sittin' in Your Stairwell" (Beth Nielsen Chapman) - 4:19
3. "Baby I Want It" (Chapman) - 2:54
4. "Walk Me in the Rain" (Tony Romeo) - 3:38
5. "Love Will Get You Through Times of No Money" (Sam Lorber, Tim DuBois, Jeff Silbar) - 3:20
6. "Slow Boat to China" (Ragogna) - 3:28
7. "Pretty Boy's Cadillac" (Radney Foster, Beckie Foster) - 3:12
8. "The Fool in Me" (Ragogna) - 3:50
9. "I Can't Say It on the Radio" (Chris Waters, Tom Shapiro) - 3:15
10. "All I Have to Do Is Dream" (Boudleaux Bryant) - 3:18

== Personnel ==
Girls Next Door

- Doris King - vocals
- Cindy Nixon - vocals
- Tammy Stephens - vocals
- Diane Williams - vocals

Musicians

- Pete Bordonali - acoustic guitar
- Sonny Garrish - steel guitar
- Steve Gibson - acoustic guitar, electric guitar
- Jon Goin - electric guitar
- Shane Keister - keyboards, Fairlight CMI
- Larrie Londin - drums
- Brent Rowan - acoustic guitar, electric guitar
- Steve Schaffer - bass guitar
- Dennis Solee - saxophone
- James Stroud - drums
- Tommy West - keyboards

Strings on "All I Have to Do Is Dream"

- John Borg
- John Catchings
- Roy Christensen
- Carl Gorodetzky
- Lennie Haight
- Lee Larrison
- Dennis Molchan
- Pam Sixfin
- Chris Teal
- Gary Vanosdale
- Stephanie Woolf

Technical

- Ken Criblez - assistant engineer
- Carlos Eguiguren - photography
- Vicki Hicks - production assistant, assistant engineer
- Kerry Kopp - assistant engineer
- Warren Peterson - recording, mixing, engineering
- Mike Ragogna - vocal arranger
- Tommy West - producer, vocal arranger
