= Are You Ever Gonna Love Me =

Single by Holly Dunn

from the album The Blue Rose of Texas
- B-side: "If I'd Never Loved You"
- Released: May 1989 (U.S.)
- Recorded: 1988
- Genre: Country
- Length: 2:38
- Label: Warner Bros. Nashville
- Songwriters: Holly Dunn, Tom Shapiro and Chris Waters
- Producers: Holly Dunn, Chris Waters

Holly Dunn singles chronology
"(It's Always Gonna Be) Someday" (1988)	"Are You Ever Gonna Love Me" (1989)	"There Goes My Heart Again" (1989)

"'Are You Ever Gonna Love Me" is a song co-written and recorded by American country music artist Holly Dunn. It was released in May 1989 as the first single from the album The Blue Rose of Texas. Written by Dunn, along with Tom Shapiro and her brother Chris Waters, the song was her first single released by Warner Bros. Records, to which she signed after her previous label, MTM Records, was disestablished.

In August 1989, "Are You Ever Gonna Love Me" became her first (of two) No. 1 songs on the Billboard Hot Country Singles chart. Its 14 weeks spent in the top 40 including a week at No. 1.

== Chart performance ==
Chart (1989)	Peak position
Canada Country Singles (RPM)	6
US Hot Country Songs (Billboard)	1

=== Year-end charts ===
Chart (1989)	Position
Canada Country Tracks (RPM)	89
US Country Songs (Billboard)	20
