= Getting It Dunn =

Studio album by Holly Dunn
- Released: June 16, 1992
- Genre: Country
- Label: Warner Bros. Nashville
- Producer: Holly Dunn, Paul Worley, Ed Seay, and Chris Waters

Holly Dunn chronology
Milestones: Greatest Hits (1991)	Getting It Dunn (1992)	Life and Love and All the Stages (1995)

Professional ratings
Review scores
Source	Rating
Allmusic	4.5/5 stars

Getting It Dunn is the sixth album by country music artist Holly Dunn. Released in 1992, it includes the singles "No Love Have I", "As Long as You Belong to Me" and "Golden Years". The Verlon Thompson/Beth Nielsen Chapman-written "You Say You Will" was almost simultaneously covered by Trisha Yearwood on her album Hearts in Armor, in the same year of 1992. Terry Radigan later released "Half a Million Teardrops" as a single in 1995.

Dunn produced the album with Paul Worley and Ed Seay, except for the track "Let Go", which she produced with her older brother, singer-songwriter Chris Waters.

== Track listing ==
No.	Title	Writer(s)	Length
1.	"No Love Have I"	Mel Tillis	2:16
2.	"If Your Heart Can't Do the Talking"	Lynn Langham, Craig Wiseman	3:47
3.	"Golden Years"	Sam Hogin, Gretchen Peters	3:38
4.	"You Say You Will"	Verlon Thompson, Beth Nielsen Chapman	3:58
5.	"I Laughed Until I Cried"	Michael Garvin, Tom Shapiro, Bucky Jones	3:21
6.	"As Long as You Belong to Me"	Holly Dunn, Chris Waters, Shapiro	3:04
7.	"Let Go"	Dunn, Waters, Shapiro	2:39
8.	"I've Heard It All"	Dunn, Waters, Shapiro	3:12
9.	"Half a Million Teardrops"	Wally Wilson, Mike Henderson	2:40
10.	"You Can Have Him"	Dunn, Waters, Shapiro	3:17
11.	"A Simple I Love You"	Karen Brooks, Randy Sharp	3:00

== Personnel ==
- Dennis Burnside - piano
- Larry Byrom - electric guitar
- Carol Chase - backing vocals
- Joe Chemay - bass guitar
- Sonny Garrish - steel guitar
- Rob Hajacos - fiddle
- Bill Hullett - acoustic guitar, electric guitar
- Wendy S. Johnson - backing vocals
- Anthony Martin - keyboards, backing vocals
- Brent Mason - electric guitar
- The Nashville String Machine - strings
- Steve Nathan - piano
- Deanie Richardson - fiddle
- Tom Robb - bass guitar
- Gary Smith - piano
- Biff Watson - acoustic guitar
- Dennis Wilson - backing vocals
- Paul Worley - acoustic guitar, electric guitar
- Curtis Young - backing vocals
- Rusty Young - steel guitar
