= Judy Rodman =

American musician

- Born: Judy Mae Robbins; May 23, 1951 (age 75)
- Origin: Riverside, California, United States
- Genres: Country
- Occupations: Singer, songwriter
- Instruments: Vocals, guitar, keyboards
- Years active: 1984–present
- Label: MTM
- Website: Judy Rodman Official Website

Judy Mae Rodman (née Robbins; May 23, 1951) is an American country music singer and songwriter. In the mid-1980s, she was a successful recording artist; making it all the way to number one on the Billboard Hot Country Singles Chart in 1986 with the song "Until I Met You." She also won the Academy of Country Music's "Top New Female Vocalist" award in 1985.

Today, Rodman is a singer, songwriter, producer and vocal instructor in Nashville, Tennessee. Her recorded songs include LeAnn Rimes's number-one hit "One Way Ticket (Because I Can)" (co-written with Keith Hinton). She has also developed Power, Path & Performance; a vocal technique she teaches and sells on CDs.

== Early life and rise to fame ==
Rodman was born Judy Mae Robbins on May 23, 1951, in Riverside, California. She was singing by the time she was four years old, and playing the guitar by age eight. Rodman's parents moved often. After living in so many places, Rodman's musical tastes included eclectic sounds like Cajun and Calypso music. When Rodman was 17 years old, she began singing advertising jingles. Her voice was heard nationally on a Jeno's Pizza commercial. Rodman left for college at eighteen to study music. Her college roommate was future female Country vocalist Janie Fricke. The two became fast friends and were hired as jingle singers for the Tanner Agency in Memphis, Tennessee. Rodman also sang with a local nightclub band called Phase II.

In the mid-1970s, Rodman worked primarily as a background vocalist. In 1980, Judy married drummer and professional fisherman, John Rodman and the couple moved to Nashville, Tennessee. Rodman continued to record radio and TV jingles for mainstream companies while trying to break into the country music business.

== Country music stardom in the 1980s ==
Soon, Rodman switched occupations and went back to singing background vocals. She backed Country stars Johnny Cash, Tammy Wynette and more. She also sang back up for legendary Blues performer Ray Charles. Rodman soon decided she wanted to become a Country singer. Success came when she was soon signed to MTM Records. She was the first artist to be signed to the fledgling record label.

Her debut single, "I've Been Had By Love Before," entered the Top forty of the Country singles chart (#40). Her next single, "You're Gonna Miss Me When I'm Gone," did as well (#33). By the end of 1985, she peaked at number thirty with her self-penned song "I Sure Need Your Lovin". Also that year, Rodman won the coveted Academy of Country Music's "Top New Female Vocalist" award.

Judy Rodman released her first album in 1986. It was simply titled Judy, and it contained the three previously released singles from 1985 as well as new material. One of the new songs, "Until I Met You," became a number one Country hit. The song spent the week of July 19 at the top of the Billboard Hot Country Singles chart list. Rodman had continuing chart success that year. "She Thinks That She'll Marry" was the next single released off of the Judy album. It became a top ten Country hit as well; peaking at number nine.

In 1987, Rodman's second album entitled A Place Called Love was released. The album spawned two top ten Country hits: "Girls Ride Horses Too" and a cover of Bob Dylan's "I'll Be Your Baby Tonight".

Several singles from Rodman's forthcoming third album proved modestly successful with radio, but the MTM Records label folded. Subsequently, the album was never released. The same proved true with her record labelmates, The Girls Next Door.

After MTM records liquidated, Rodman eventually faded away from the country music spotlight, but not out of the business altogether.

== New horizons ==
Soon, Rodman faded off Billboard's Country Music charts. This around the same time Neo-Traditional Country singers were entering Nashville and the Country market's taking up spots on the country music charts, and finding their way on the Top 10 and Top 20 on the charts. Singers like, George Strait, Randy Travis, Kathy Mattea, Patty Loveless, Ricky Van Shelton, Lyle Lovett, and Dwight Yoakam all found their way to making hits on the Country charts around this time. Country-Pop-styled vocalists, like Rodman, and her friend Janie Fricke to name a few, were soon finding less and less success on the Country charts.

However, Rodman found different ways to keep herself busy in the music industry. Around this time, Rodman worked in the recording studio as a track producer, vocal producer and background singer once again. As a new decade approached, she re-found success as a songwriter as well. She wrote songs for Warner-Chappell music, Chrysalis Music, and her own publishing company, Favorable Wind Songs. One of many successful compositions were LeAnn Rimes No. 1 hit, "One Way Ticket" and the Tammy Wynette/Wynonna Judd duet, "Girl Thang". She also developed her own vocal training method and began working with all kinds of genres of singers, including singer-songwriter Radney Foster, new pop artists Mat Kearney and Emil Bishaw and country artists Bryan White and Australian star Shea Fisher and musical theater projects like her own Runaway Home and We the People.

Rodman is a professional vocal coach, recording studio producer and songwriter, as well as continuing her recording session singing and live performances. Her trademarked vocal training method is called "Power, Path, and Performance". Rodman currently sells CD vocal training products available on her official website.

== Discography ==
=== Studio albums ===
Title	Album details	Peak positions
Title	Album details	US Country
Judy	Release date: 1986; Label: MTM	23
A Place Called Love	Release date: 1987; Label: MTM	29

=== Singles ===
Year	Single	Peak chart positions		Album
Year	Single	US Country	CAN Country	Album
1985	"I've Been Had by Love Before"	40	—	Judy
1985	"You're Gonna Miss Me When I'm Gone"	33	—	Judy
1985	"I Sure Need Your Lovin'"	30	—	Judy
1986	"Until I Met You"	1	—	Judy
1986	"She Thinks That She'll Marry"	9	—	Judy
1987	"Girls Ride Horses Too"	7	10	A Place Called Love
1987	"I'll Be Your Baby Tonight"	5	9	A Place Called Love
1987	"I Want a Love Like That"	18	41	A Place Called Love
1988	"Goin' to Work"	43	—	Goin' to Work (unreleased)
1988	"I Can Love You"	45	64	Goin' to Work (unreleased)
"—" denotes releases that did not chart.

=== Music videos ===
Year	Single	Director
1985	"You're Gonna Miss Me When I'm Gone"	
1985	"I Sure Need Your Lovin'"	
1986	"Until I Met You"	Byron Binkley
1986	"She Thinks That She'll Marry"	
1988	"Goin' to Work"	Mary Newman-Said
