= Alice Randall =

American author and songwriter (born 1959)

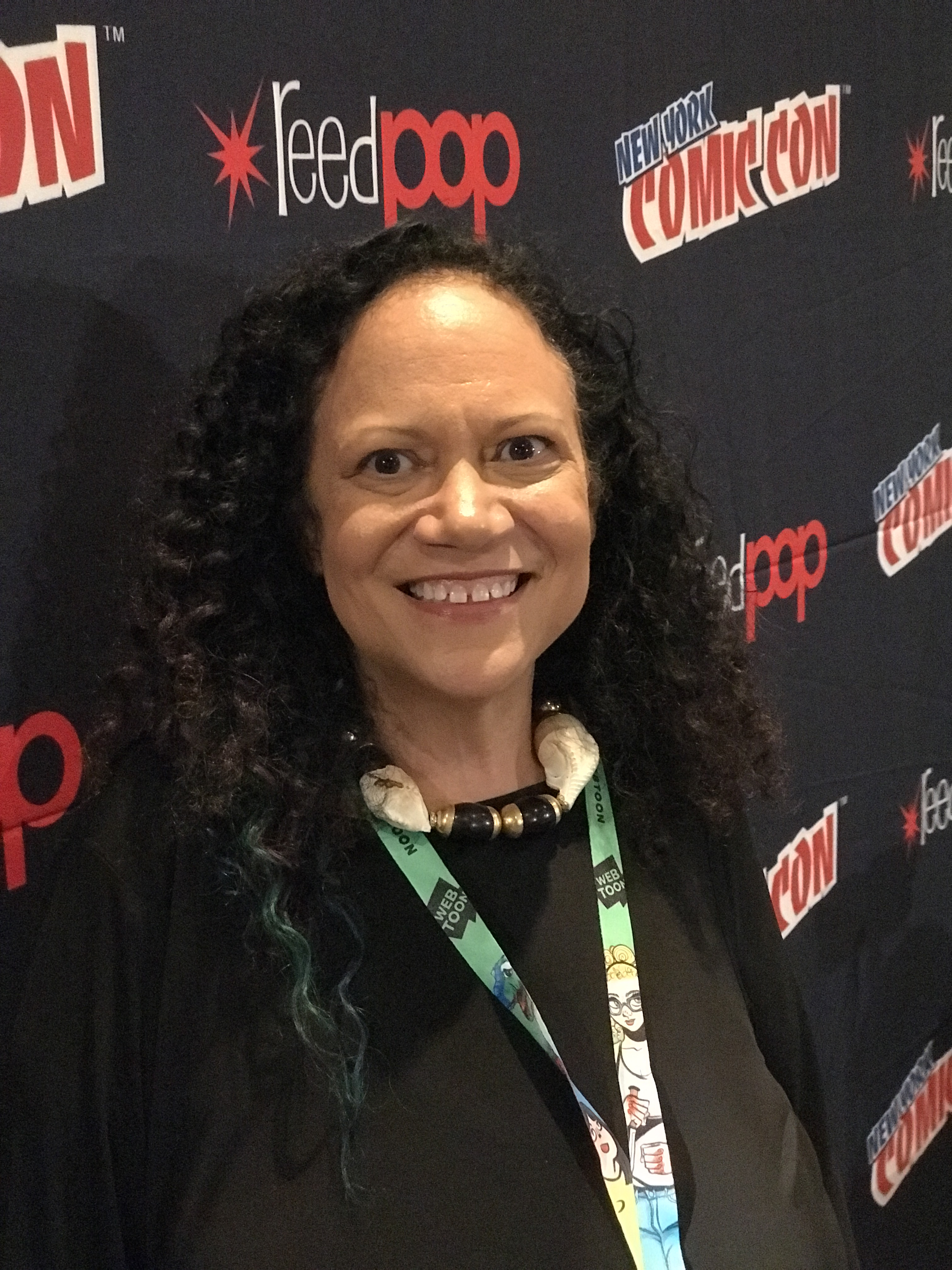
- Randall at the New York Comic Con
- Born: Mari-Alice Randall; May 4, 1959 (age 67); Detroit, Michigan, U.S.
- Education: Harvard University
- Occupations: Author; songwriter; screenwriter; educator
- Spouse: David Ewing (1997--2017)
- Children: Caroline Randall Williams
- Writing career
- Language: English
- Genres: Historical fiction, political fiction
- Website: www.alicerandall.com

Alice Randall (born May 4, 1959) is an American author, songwriter, producer, and lecturer. She is best known for her contributions to country music, in addition to her novel and New York Times bestseller The Wind Done Gone, which is a reinterpretation and parody of the 1936 novel Gone with the Wind.

== Early life ==
Mari-Alice Randall was born on May 4, 1959, in Detroit, Michigan, and was raised in Washington, D.C. She attended Harvard University, where she earned an honors bachelor's degree in English and American literature and graduated cum laude.

In 1983, she moved to Nashville, Tennessee, to become a country songwriter, where she still resides on the Vanderbilt University campus. Alice Randall was married until 1990 to Avon Nyanza Williams III, son of Avon N. Williams and together they had a daughter, Caroline. In 1997, She married David Ewing, a ninth-generation Nashvillian, historian and former lawyer. She is currently a writer-in-residence and Professor at Vanderbilt University.

== Career ==
=== Music ===
On her second night in Nashville in 1983, Alice Randall was discovered by Steve Earle at the Bluebird Cafe. Earle taught Randall how to be a country songwriter, beginning that evening. After starting her career in country music under the mentorship of Steve Earle, Randall founded her own music production company titled Midsummer Music in Nashville.

Randall co-wrote XXX's and OOO's (An American Girl), which was released as a single in 1994 by country music singer Trisha Yearwood. On September 10, 1994, it became the second song co-written by a Black songwriter to top Billboard’s Country Airplay chart (after Starting Over Again, co-written by Donna Summer). Over 20 of her songs have been recorded, including several top 10 and top 40 records; with many of her songs having been performed by Trisha Yearwood and Mark O'Connor. Additionally, she contributed to Johnny Cash's "The Chicken in Black", which was on the US Hot Country Songs by Billboard for twelve weeks.

In addition to her song writing, Randall also wrote the video of the year "Is There Life Out There" by Reba McEntire, which won at the 1992 Academy of Country Music Awards.

=== Writing ===
==== Fiction ====
Randall is the author of six fiction novels:

- The Wind Done Gone (Houghton Mifflin Company, 2001)
- Pushkin and the Queen of Spades (2004)
- Rebel Yell (2009)
- Ada's Rules: A Sexy Skinny Novel (2012)
- The Diary of B.B. Bright, Possible Princess (2013) winner of the Phillis Wheatley Award
- Black Bottom Saints (2020)

Her first novel The Wind Done Gone, is a reinterpretation and parody of Margaret Mitchell's 1936 novel Gone with the Wind. The Wind Done Gone retells Gone with the Wind from the viewpoint of Scarlett O'Hara's half-sister Cynara, a mulatto slave on Scarlett's plantation.

Randall and the publishing company of The Wind Done Gone, Houghton Mifflin, were sued in April 2001 by the Mitchell Estate on the grounds that The Wind Done Gone infringed the copyright of Gone with the Wind. The lawsuit, Suntrust v. Houghton Mifflin Co., was settled, allowing The Wind Done Gone to be published on the condition of a label of "An Unauthorized Parody". In addition, Houghton Mifflin agreed to make a financial contribution to the Morehouse College, a historically black education institution in Atlanta supported by the Mitchell estate. The novel became a New York Times bestseller.

Randall's second novel, Pushkin and the Queen of Spades, was named as one of The Washington Post's "Best Fiction of 2004."

==== Non-fiction ====
Published by Random House in 2015, the cookbook "Soul Food Love" was co-written by Randall and her daughter, Caroline Randall Williams, an author and poet. Alice Randall and Caroline Randall Williams wrote the cookbook to inspire healthy living in their lives and in the African American community, by reducing fats and sugars, while paying homage to traditional soul food. In February 2016, the book received the 2016 NAACP Image Award for Literature (Instructional).

In 2006, Alice Randall also wrote My Country Roots, alongside Carter and Courtney Little. She published this non-fiction piece in Nashville, by Naked Ink.

In 2024, Alice Randall released *My Black Country: A Journey Through Country Music's Black Past, Present, and Future through Atria/Black Privilege Publishing. A companion album, *My Black Country - The Songs of Alice Randall - Various Artists - CD was released by Oh Boy Records.

=== Production ===
Randall wrote and produced the pilot of the television movie XXX's and OOO's, a film about four ex-wives of country music singers, on CBS in 1994. The 1 hour and 50 minute film was directed by Allan Arkush and co-written by John Wilder.

=== Education ===
Randall is now a professor at Vanderbilt University, where she resides as a writer-in-residence and serves as the Andrew W. Mellon Chair in the Humanities. At Vanderbilt, she specializes in soul food, African American children's literature, African American film, and creative writing. She teaches courses including lectures on "Country Lyric in American Culture" and "Soul Food as Text and In Text". While at Vanderbilt, she is working on using the arts in the American health disparity as well as the international health disparity.

== Awards ==
Randall received the Al Neuharth Free Spirit Award in 2001 and the Literature Award of Excellence from the Memphis Black Writers Conference in 2002. She was a finalist for an NAACP Image Award in 2002. Randall was also accepted for a prestigious writing residency at the famed Yaddo artist's community from June 23, 2011, to July 24, 2011. Randall and her daughter, Caroline Randall Williams, received the 2016 NAACP Image Award for Literature (Instructional) for their book, Soul Food Love.

Randall was inducted into the Silver Circle in 2008, in honor of working in the country music industry for a quarter of a century. She was inducted alongside 10 other nominees, notably Reba McEntire, whose video of the year she wrote in 1992.

== Songs ==
- The Ballad of Sally Anne – Mark O'Connor, River City Ramblers
- Big Dream – Samantha Mathis
- Blinded By Stars – Adrienne Young
- Get the Hell Out of Dodge – Walter Hyatt
- Girls Ride Horses Too – Judy Rodman
- I'll Cry for Yours (Will You Cry for Mine) – Tamra Rosanes
- Many Mansions – Moe Bandy
- Reckless Night – The Forester Sisters
- Small Towns (Are Smaller for Girls) – Holly Dunn
- Solitary Hero – Carol Elliot
- The Resurrection – The Nitty Gritty Dirt Band
- Went for a Ride – Radney Foster
- Who's Minding the Garden – Glen Campbell
- XXX's and OOO's (An American Girl) – Trisha Yearwood

== See also ==
- Black veganism
- Soul food
- Healthcare in the United States
- Global health
- Songwriter
- Country music
