= Two Doors Down =

Two Doors Down may refer to:

== Music ==
- "Two Doors Down" (Dolly Parton song), a 1977 song by Dolly Parton off the album Here You Come Again
- "Two Doors Down" (Mystery Jets song), a 2008 song by Mystery Jets off the album Twenty One
- "Two Doors Down", a 1993 song by Dwight Yoakam off the album This Time

== Television ==
- Two Doors Down (TV series), a BBC Scotland television sitcom set in Glasgow
- "Two Doors Down", a 2019 episode of Dolly Parton's Heartstrings
- "Two Doors Down", a 2016 episode of Cops

== Other uses ==
- Two Doors Down, a UK radio programme; see List of UK radio programmes

== See also ==
- 3 Doors Down (disambiguation)
- Next Door (disambiguation)
