= Caroline Randall Williams =

American writer

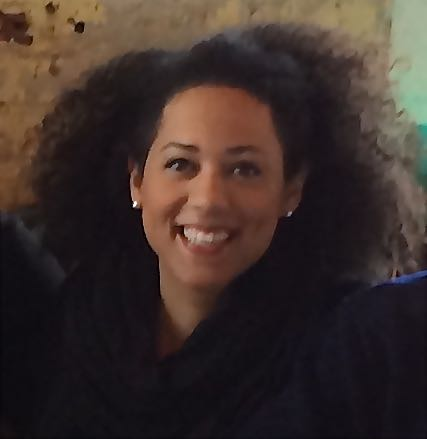
- Williams in December 2013
- Born: August 24, 1987 (age 39); Nashville, Tennessee, U.S.
- Education: St. Paul's School; Harvard University; University of Mississippi (MFA)
- Known for: Soul Food Love
- Awards: NAACP Image Award

Caroline Randall Williams (born August 24, 1987) is an American author, poet and academic best known for the 2015 cookbook Soul Food Love, co-written with her mother, author Alice Randall, and published by Random House. In February, 2016, Soul Food Love received the NAACP Image Award in Literature (Instructional).

In 2015, her book of poetry, Lucy Negro, Redux was published by Ampersand Books. Lucy Negro, Redux was adapted as a ballet by the Nashville Ballet.

== Biography ==
Williams is a native of Nashville, Tennessee. She graduated from St. Paul's School in 2006 and from Harvard University in 2010. After graduation, she spent two years as an instructor in the Teach for America program. She received an MFA in creative writing from the University of Mississippi in 2015. She is the daughter of Alice Randall and Avon Williams III.

She is the great-granddaughter of Arna Bontemps, the African-American poet, novelist and noted member of the Harlem Renaissance, and the granddaughter of Avon Williams, the Nashville lawyer and key leader of the city's civil rights movement. One of her great-great-grandfathers was Edmund Pettus, a white US senator of Alabama, senior officer of the Confederate States Army and grand dragon of the Ku Klux Klan. Pettus and his enslaved black servant were the parents of her great-grandfather Will. She has stated, "The black people I come from were owned and raped by the white people I come from."

In January 2015, she was named by Southern Living magazine as one of the "50 People Changing the South in 2015." In 2015, she joined the faculty of West Virginia University as an assistant professor. In 2016 she was appointed Writer-In-Residence at Fisk University. In the Fall of 2019, she joined the faculty of Vanderbilt University. as the Writer-In-Residence of Medicine, Health, and Society.

== Books ==
=== Soul Food Love ===
Published by Random House in 2015, Soul Food Love: Healthy Recipes Inspired by One Hundred Years of Cooking in a Black Family is co-authored by Williams and her mother, the novelist Alice Randall. According to the publisher, the book relates the authors’ family history (which mirrors that of much of black America in the 20th century), explores the often fraught relationship African-American women have had with food, and forges a powerful new way forward that honors their cultural and culinary heritage.

=== Lucy Negro, Redux ===
Williams' debut book of poetry was published in 2015 by Ampersand Books. The collection explores William Shakespeare's love life, theorizing that the Dark Lady in his sonnets was a woman of African descent. In a review for the Nashville Scene, Erica Wright stated that the collection "does so with such grit, music and honesty that readers will find themselves rooting for the poet's theory — that Shakespeare once had a black lover and immortalized her in verse — to be true." Lucy Negro, Redux was adapted as a ballet by Nashville Ballet.

==== Attitude: Lucy Negro Redux ====
Lucy Negro, Redux has been adapted as a ballet titled Attitude: Lucy Negro Redux, choreographed by Paul Vasterling. It was premiered by the Nashville Ballet at the Polk Theater of the Tennessee Performing Arts Center on February 8, 2019. Kayla Rowser danced the role of Lucy and Rhiannon Giddens scored and performed the music.

=== The Diary of B. B. Bright, Possible Princess ===
Co-written by Williams and Randall, the book was published by Turner Publishing Company in 2012. According to the publisher, the middle-grade fantasy book is the tale of one young woman's adventure to pass her Official Princess Test, discover a means of escape from her island, and reveal her true destiny.

The book received the following accolades: The NAACP Image Award for Youth Literature, 2013 (nomination), Cybils Award in Middle Grade Fantasy, 2012 (nomination) and the Harlem Book Fair's Phillis Wheatley Award for Young Adult Readers, 2013 (winner).

== Essays ==
=== New York Times opinion piece ===
In 2020, amidst the national discussions around removing statues of Confederate generals and renaming of U.S. military bases, Williams wrote an opinion piece for the New York Times, titled "You Want a Confederate Monument? My Body Is A Confederate Monument." She argued for the removal of Confederate monuments, using her existence and family history to make her point. In that essay, she stated, "modern DNA testing has allowed me to confirm, I am the descendant of black women who were domestic servants and white men who raped their help." She opened the piece by writing: "I have rape-colored skin. My light-brown-blackness is a living testament to the rules, the practices, the causes of the Old South."

== Bibliography ==
- Randall, Alice; Williams, Caroline Randall (2012). The Diary of B. B. Bright, Possible Princess. Turner. ISBN 978-1-61858-015-3.
- Randall, Alice; Williams, Caroline Randall (2015-02-03). Soul Food Love. Clarkson Potter. ISBN 978-0-8041-3793-5.
- Williams, Caroline Randall (2019). Lucy Negro, Redux. Third Man Books. ISBN 978-0-9974578-2-7.
