= Maybe I Mean Yes =

1991 single by Holly Dunn

Single by Holly Dunn

from the album Milestones: Greatest Hits
- B-side: "Daddy's Hands"
- Released: July 1991
- Genre: Country
- Length: 2:59
- Label: Warner Bros. Nashville
- Songwriters: Dunn; Chris Waters; Tom Shapiro
- Producers: Dunn; Waters

Holly Dunn singles chronology
"Heart Full of Love" (1991)	"Maybe I Mean Yes" (1991)	"No One Takes the Train Anymore" (1991)

"Maybe I Mean Yes" is a song by American country music singer Holly Dunn. It was a new song from her 1991 compilation Milestones: Greatest Hits, from which it was released as a single in July 1991. Dunn wrote and produced the song with her brother Chris Waters. The song debuted on the Billboard Hot Country Songs chart on July 14, was quickly (but not instantly) withdrawn from airplay per Dunn's request to broadcasters on July 25, while climbing the chart, due to controversy over the song's lyrics.

== Content ==
Written by Dunn along with her brother Chris Waters and songwriter Tom Shapiro, the song is about a flirtatious woman. Dunn herself described the song as a "lighthearted look at one couple's attempt at dating, handled in an innocent, nonsexual, flirtatious way."

== Critical reception ==
Kimmy Wix of Cash Box wrote that the song "drives her scorching vocals to an all-time-high performance" and that it "also ranks high on the list with commanding lyrics, spicy instrumentation and a barreling tempo that conjures up a musical storm."

== Controversy ==
The song was the subject of controversy at the time of its release concerning the lyric "When I say 'no' I mean 'maybe', or maybe I mean 'yes'." Due to negative feedback from listeners who perceived this lyric as condoning date rape, Dunn sent letters to radio stations and television stations, asking for the single to be withdrawn from rotation. Dunn also stated that "My co-writers and I stand by our original intent 100%." Dunn also agreed to stop performing the song in concert.

== Chart performance ==
The song peaked at No. 48 on the Hot Country Songs chart dated August 10, 1991, after only five weeks on the charts. Despite Dunn's decision to withdraw the song having already been enacted, it increased in airplay for that week, rising from the No. 53 position.

Chart (1991)	Peak position
US Hot Country Songs (Billboard)	48
