= The Man Next Door =

The Man Next Door may refer to:

== Literature ==
- The Man Next Door, a 1916 novel by Emerson Hough
- The Man Next Door, a 1919 non-fiction book by Algernon B. Jackson
- The Man Next Door (novel), a 1943 American spy thriller by Mignon G. Eberhart
- The Man Next Door, a 1991 novel by Alexandra Sellers
- The Man Next Door, a 2008 novel by Gina Ferris Wilkins
- The Man Next Door, a 2014 novel by Ann Diamond

== Film and television ==
- The Man Next Door (1923 film), American silent comedy drama film directed by Victor Schertzinger
- The Man Next Door (1996 film), American television film directed by Lamont Johnson
- The Man Next Door (1997 film), American film starring Karen Carlson
- The Man Next Door (2010 film), Argentine film
- "The Man Next Door", Dennis the Menace (1959) season 3, episode 30 (1962)

== See also ==
- Boy Next Door (disambiguation)
- Girl Next Door (disambiguation)
- The House Next Door (disambiguation)
- The Family Next Door (disambiguation)
- The People Next Door (disambiguation)
- The Woman Next Door (disambiguation)
