= Rollin' Nowhere =

Single by Michael Martin Murphey

from the album Tonight We Ride
- B-side: "Santa Fe Cantina"
- Released: May 12, 1986
- Genre: Country
- Length: 2:58
- Label: Warner Bros.
- Songwriter(s): Michael Martin Murphey
- Producer(s): Jim Ed Norman

Michael Martin Murphey singles chronology
"Tonight We Ride" (1986)	"Rollin' Nowhere" (1986)	"Fiddlin' Man" (1986)

"Rollin' Nowhere" is a song written and recorded by American country music artist Michael Martin Murphey. It was released in May 1986 as the second single from the album Tonight We Ride. The song peaked at number 15 on the U.S. Billboard Hot Country Singles and at number 14 on the Canadian RPM Country Tracks chart.

== Chart performance ==
Chart (1986)	Peak position
US Hot Country Songs (Billboard)	15
Canadian RPM Country Tracks	14
