= Across the Rio Grande (album) =

Studio album by Holly Dunn
- Released: 1988
- Genre: Country
- Label: MTM
- Producer: Holly Dunn, Warren Peterson, Chris Waters

Holly Dunn chronology
Cornerstone (1987)	Across the Rio Grande (1988)	The Blue Rose of Texas (1989)

Singles from Across the Rio Grande
- 1. "That's What Your Love Does to Me" Released: June 25, 1988; 2. "(It's Always Gonna Be) Someday" Released: November 5, 1988

Professional ratings
Review scores
Source	Rating
Allmusic	4.5/5 stars

Across the Rio Grande is the third studio album by American country music artist Holly Dunn released in 1988. It did not do quite as well as the preceding Cornerstone. The only hits were the #5 "That's What Your Love Does to Me", and "(It's Always Gonna Be) Someday," which logged in at Billboard Top Country Singles #11. The album itself was at #26 on the Country albums charts.

== Track listing ==
No.	Title	Writer(s)	Length
1.	"City Limit"	Holly Dunn, Tom Shapiro, Chris Waters	3:00
2.	"The Stronger the Tie"	Shapiro, Waters	3:17
3.	"Just Across the Rio Grande"	Don Cook, Chick Rains	4:16
4.	"Have a Heart"	Dunn, Shapiro, Waters	2:41
5.	"If Nobody Knew My Name"	Dunn, Shapiro, Waters	3:15
6.	"That's What Your Love Does to Me"	Chick Rains, Bill Caswell	2:43
7.	"(It's Always Gonna Be) Someday"	Dunn, Shapiro, Waters	2:56
8.	"Lonesome Highway"	Dunn, Earl Bud Lee	3:29
9.	"Travelin' Prayer"	Billy Joel	4:56
10.	"On the Wings of an Angel"	Dunn, Don Schlitz	4:09

== Chart performance ==
Chart (1988)	Peak position
U.S. Billboard Top Country Albums	26
