= (It's Always Gonna Be) Someday =

Single by Holly Dunn

from the album Across the Rio Grande
- B-side: "On the Wings on an Angel"
- Released: November 5, 1988
- Genre: Country
- Length: 2:57
- Label: MTM
- Songwriters: Holly Dunn, Tom Shapiro, Chris Waters
- Producers: Holly Dunn, Warren Peterson, Chris Waters

Holly Dunn singles chronology
| "That's What Your Love Does to Me" (1988) | "(It's Always Gonna Be) Someday" (1988) | "Are You Ever Gonna Love Me" (1989) |

"(It's Always Gonna Be) Someday" is a song co-written and recorded by American country music artist Holly Dunn. It was released in November 1988 as the second single from the album Across the Rio Grande. The song reached #11 on the Billboard Hot Country Singles & Tracks chart. The song was written by Dunn, Tom Shapiro and Chris Waters.

== Chart performance ==
| Chart (1988–1989) | Peak position |
|---|---|
| US Hot Country Songs (Billboard) | 11 |
