= The House Next Door =

The House Next Door may refer to:

== Film ==
- The House Next Door, a 2002 film directed by Joey Travolta
- The House Next Door (2006 film), a made-for-television film produced by the Lifetime Network
- The House Next Door (2017 film), an Indian trilingual film
- The House Next Door: Meet the Blacks 2, a 2021 American parody black comedy horror film
- The House Next Door, a 2022 documentary about the foreclosure crisis of 2008 in Cleveland

== Television ==
=== Episodes ===
- "The House Next Door", As Time Goes By series 6, episode 6 (1997)
- "The House Next Door", Bob Hope Presents the Chrysler Theatre season 1, episode 6 (1963)
- "The House Next Door", ITV Television Playhouse season 4, episode 27 (1959)
- "The House Next Door", NBC Matinee Theater season 2, episode 19 (1956)
- "The House Next Door", Pete and Gladys season 1, episode 18 (1961)
- "The House Next Door", Queens Supreme episode 10 (2003)
- "The House Next Door", The First 48 season 13, episode 4 (2012)

=== Shows ===
- The House Next Door (telenovela), a 2011 Telemundo telenovela

== Literature ==
- The House Next Door (German: Die von Hochsattel), an early 20th Century theatre production written by Leo Stein, published in 1907
- The House Next Door, a 1912 play by J. Hartley Manners
- The House Next Door, a 1932 novel by Burton E. Stevenson
- The House Next Door, a 1946 novel by Ethel Nokes
- The House Next Door: Utah 1896, a 1954 novel by Virginia Sorensen
- The House Next Door, a 1956 novel by Lionel White
- The House Next Door (novel), a 1976 novel by Anne Rivers Siddons
- The House Next Door: Seattle's Neighborhood Architecture, a 1981 coffee table book by Lila Gault featuring photographs of the residential architecture of Seattle by Mary Randlett
- Mary Poppins and the House Next Door, a 1988 novel by P. L. Travers, the eighth installment in the Mary Poppins series
- The House Next Door, a 2002 novel by Richie Tankersley Cusick
- Mr Birdsnest and the House Next Door, a 2012 children's book by Julia Donaldson
- The House Next Door, a 2017 novel by Darcy Coates
- The House Next Door, a 2017 YA novel by Joel A. Sutherland, the first volume of the Haunted fiction series
- The House Next Door (short story collection), a 2019 book of three stories by James Patterson and three lesser known authors

== Other uses ==
- The House Next Door (Big Brother), a series of rooms connected to the 2006 Big Brother House for the UK television series
- The House Next Door, the official blog of Slant magazine, which is "home" to columns about media, the arts and current events

== See also ==
- The Next-Door House, an 1892 novel by Mary Louisa Molesworth
- Boy Next Door (disambiguation)
- Girl Next Door (disambiguation)
- The Family Next Door (disambiguation)
- The Man Next Door (disambiguation)
- The People Next Door (disambiguation)
- The Woman Next Door (disambiguation)
