= Fiddlin' Man =

Single by Michael Martin Murphey

from the album Tonight We Ride
- B-side: "Ghost Town (Messages from the Ghost Ranch)"
- Released: August 30, 1986
- Genre: Country
- Length: 4:48
- Label: Warner Bros.
- Songwriter(s): Michael Martin Murphey
- Producer(s): Jim Ed Norman

Michael Martin Murphey singles chronology
| "Rollin' Nowhere" (1986) | "Fiddlin' Man" (1986) | "A Face in the Crowd" (1987) |

"Fiddlin' Man" is a song written and recorded by American country music artist Michael Martin Murphey. It was released in August 1986 as the third single from the album Tonight We Ride. The song reached No. 40 on the Billboard Hot Country Singles & Tracks chart.

== Chart performance ==
| Chart (1986) | Peak position |
|---|---|
| US Hot Country Songs (Billboard) | 40 |
