= The Ballad of Sally Anne =

"The Ballad of Sally Anne" is a song with lyrics written by Alice Randall to a traditional tune. Its topic is unusual among country songs - a race lynching. The song was recorded by Mark O'Connor's band project New Nashville Cats.
