= Talkin' to the Wrong Man =

Single by Michael Martin Murphey with Ryan Murphey

from the album River of Time
- B-side: "What Am I Doin' Hangin' Around"
- Released: February 1988
- Genre: Country
- Length: 3:24
- Label: Warner Bros.
- Songwriter(s): Michael Martin Murphey
- Producer(s): Steve Gibson

Michael Martin Murphey singles chronology
"I'm Gonna Miss You, Girl" (1987)	"Talkin' to the Wrong Man" (1988)	"Pilgrims on the Way (Matthew's Song)" (1988)

"Talkin' to the Wrong Man" is a song written and recorded by American country music artist Michael Martin Murphey as a duet with his son Ryan Murphey. It was released in February 1988 as the second single from Murphey's album River of Time. The song reached number 4 on the Billboard Hot Country Singles chart in July 1988 and number 1 on the RPM Country Tracks chart in Canada.

== Charts ==
=== Weekly charts ===
Chart (1988)	Peak position
US Hot Country Songs (Billboard)	4
Canadian RPM Country Tracks	1

=== Year-end charts ===
Chart (1988)	Position
Canadian RPM Country Tracks	38
US Hot Country Songs (Billboard)	47
