= Pilgrims on the Way (Matthew's Song) =

Single by Michael Martin Murphey

from the album River of Time
- B-side: "Still Got the Fire"
- Released: September 10, 1988
- Genre: Country
- Length: 4:04
- Label: Warner Bros.
- Songwriter(s): Marcus Hummon
- Producer(s): Steve Gibson

Michael Martin Murphey singles chronology
"Talkin' to the Wrong Man" (1988)	"Pilgrims on the Way (Matthew's Song)" (1988)	"From the Word Go" (1988)

"Pilgrims on the Way (Matthew's Song)" is a song recorded by American country music artist Michael Martin Murphey. It was released in September 1988 as the third single from the album River of Time. The song reached No. 29 on the Billboard Hot Country Singles & Tracks chart. The song was written by Marcus Hummon.

== Chart performance ==
Chart (1988)	Peak position
US Hot Country Songs (Billboard)	29
