= Strangers Again (song) =

Single by Holly Dunn

from the album Cornerstone
- B-side: "Wrap Me Up"
- Released: January 16, 1988
- Genre: Country
- Length: 3:14
- Label: MTM
- Songwriter(s): Holly Dunn, Chris Waters
- Producer(s): Tommy West

Holly Dunn singles chronology
"Only When I Love" (1987)	"Strangers Again" (1988)	"That's What Your Love Does to Me" (1988)

"Strangers Again" is a song co-written and recorded by American country music artist Holly Dunn. It was released in January 1988 as the third single from the album Cornerstone. The song reached #7 on the Billboard Hot Country Singles & Tracks chart. Dunn and Chris Waters wrote the song.

== Charts ==
=== Weekly charts ===
Chart (1988)	Peak position
US Hot Country Songs (Billboard)	7
Canadian RPM Country Tracks	36

=== Year-end charts ===
Chart (1988)	Position
US Hot Country Songs (Billboard)	82
