= The Woman Next Door =

The Woman Next Door may refer to:

== Film ==
- The Woman Next Door (1915 film), a lost silent film drama directed by Walter Edwin
- The Woman Next Door (1919 film), an American silent drama film directed by Robert G. Vignola
- The Woman Next Door (1981 film), a French romantic drama film directed by François Truffaut

== Literature ==
- The Woman Next Door, a 1981 novel by T. M. Wright
- The Woman Next Door, a 2001 novel by Barbara Delinsky
- The Woman Next Door, a 2016 novel by Liz Byrski
- The Woman Next Door (novel), a 2016 novel by Yewande Omotoso

== See also ==
- Boy Next Door (disambiguation)
- Girl Next Door (disambiguation)
- The House Next Door (disambiguation)
- The Family Next Door (disambiguation)
- The Man Next Door (disambiguation)
- The People Next Door (disambiguation)
