= Holly Dunn (album) =

Studio album by Holly Dunn
- Released: 1986
- Genre: Country
- Label: MTM
- Producer: Tommy West, Holly Dunn

Holly Dunn chronology
Holly Dunn (1986)	Cornerstone (1987)

Singles from Holly Dunn
- 1. "Daddy's Hands" Released: August 23, 1986

Holly Dunn is the debut studio album by American country music artist Holly Dunn, released in 1986 through MTM Records. It includes her breakthrough hit, "Daddy's Hands".

== Track listing ==
No.	Title	Writer(s)	Length
1.	"Two Too Many"	Holly Dunn	3:26
2.	"Your Memory (Won't Let Go of Me)"	Dunn, Earl Bud Lee	2:59
3.	"Burnin' Wheel"	Radney Foster, Billy Aerts, Mickey Cates	3:02
4.	"The Sweetest Love I Never Knew"	Aerts, Casey Kelly	3:38
5.	"It'll Be All Right"	Dunn	3:47
6.	"Daddy's Hands"	Dunn	3:26
7.	"My Heart Holds On"	Hugh Prestwood	3:40
8.	"That's a Real Good Way to Get Yourself Loved"	Chris Waters, Michael Garvin, Tom Shapiro	2:49
9.	"Hideaway Heart"	Dunn, Mac Gayden, David Malloy	3:57
10.	"Someone Carried You"	Gary Burr	3:40

== Chart performance ==
Chart (1986)	Peak position
U.S. Billboard Top Country Albums	29
