= Heart Full of Love =

Studio album by Holly Dunn
- Released: May 10, 1990
- Genre: Country
- Label: Warner Bros. Nashville
- Producer: Holly Dunn and Chris Waters

Holly Dunn chronology
The Blue Rose of Texas (1989)	Heart Full of Love (1990)	Milestones: Greatest Hits (1991)

Singles from Heart Full of Love
- 1. "You Really Had Me Going" Released: September 1, 1990; 2. "Heart Full of Love" Released: January 5, 1991

Heart Full of Love is the fifth studio album by American country music singer Holly Dunn. It includes the singles "You Really Had Me Going" and "Heart Full of Love," which respectively reached number 1 and number 19 on the Hot Country Songs charts. Also included is a cover of Marty Robbins's 1961 single "Don't Worry."

== Critical reception ==
Stereo Review praised Dunn's "maturing vocal control" and said that "her songwriting, too, shows growing versatility".

== Track listing ==
No.	Title	Writer(s)	Length
1.	"Heart Full of Love"	Kostas	3:23
2.	"Don't Worry"	Marty Robbins	3:19
3.	"Temporary Loss of Memory"	Holly Dunn, Lonnie Wilson, Chris Waters	3:04
4.	"The Light in the Window Went Out"	Dunn, Waters, Ron Hellard	3:04
5.	"Home"	Karla Bonoff	3:41
6.	"My Anniversary for Being a Fool"	Dunn	3:36
7.	"You Really Had Me Going"	Dunn, Waters, Tom Shapiro	2:49
8.	"My Old Love in New Mexico"	Charlie Black, Waters, Shapiro	3:18
9.	"When No Place Is Home"	Dunn, Waters, Shapiro	3:36
10.	"Broken Heartland"	Sam Lorber, Bill LaBounty	3:24

== Personnel ==
- Grace Mihi Bahng - cello on "When No Place Is Home"
- Eddie Bayers - drums on all tracks except "You Really Had Me Going"
- Holly Dunn - lead vocals, background vocals
- Pat Flynn - acoustic guitar
- Paul Franklin - steel guitar, dobro, pedabro, "The Box"
- Steve Gibson - acoustic guitar, electric guitar, fretted dobro, gut string guitar
- Rob Hajacos - fiddle
- Connie Heard - violin on "When No Place Is Home"
- Bill Hullet - acoustic guitar, lap steel guitar
- Roy Huskey Jr. - upright bass
- The Jordanaires - background vocals on "Don't Worry"
- Chris Leuzinger - acoustic guitar, 12-string guitar
- Brent Mason - electric guitar on "You Really Had Me Going"
- Terry McMillan - harmonica
- Edgar Meyer - string arrangements on "When No Place Is Home"
- Farrell Morris - marimba
- Mark O'Connor - violin on "When No Place Is Home"
- Don Potter - acoustic guitar
- Brent Truitt - mandolin, mandola
- Chris Waters - acoustic guitar, background vocals
- Kris Wilkinson - viola on "When No Place Is Home"
- Lonnie Wilson - drums on "You Really Had Me Going", background vocals on "Temporary Loss of Memory"
- Glenn Worf - bass guitar, tic-tac bass
- Bob Mayo-Assistant Engineer on "You Really Had Me Going"

== Chart performance ==
Chart (1990)	Peak position
U.S. Billboard Top Country Albums	47
