= Heart Full of Love (song) =

1991 single recorded by Holly Dunn

Single by Holly Dunn

from the album Heart Full of Love
- B-side: "Temporary Loss of Memory"
- Released: January 5, 1991
- Genre: Country
- Length: 3:24
- Label: Warner Bros. Nashville
- Songwriter: Kostas
- Producers: Holly Dunn, Chris Waters

Holly Dunn singles chronology
"You Really Had Me Going" (1990)	"Heart Full of Love" (1991)	"Maybe I Mean Yes" (1991)

"Heart Full of Love" is a song written by Kostas, and recorded by American country music artist Holly Dunn. It was released in January 1991 as the second single and title track from the album Heart Full of Love. The song reached #19 on the Billboard Hot Country Singles & Tracks chart.

== Chart performance ==
Chart (1991)	Peak position
Canada Country Singles (RPM)	12
US Hot Country Songs (Billboard)	19
