= A Long Line of Love =

Single by Michael Martin Murphey

from the album Americana
- B-side: "Worlds Apart"
- Released: April 1987
- Recorded: ca. October 1986
- Genre: Country
- Length: 3:27
- Label: Warner Bros.
- Songwriter(s): Paul Overstreet and Thom Schuyler
- Producer(s): Jim Ed Norman

Michael Martin Murphey singles chronology
"A Face in the Crowd" (1987)	"A Long Line of Love" (1987)	"I'm Gonna Miss You, Girl" (1987)

"A Long Line of Love" is a song written by Paul Overstreet and Thom Schuyler, and recorded by American country music artist Michael Martin Murphey. It was released in April 1987 as the second single from his album Americana. The song reached number one on the U.S. and Canadian country charts in August 1987.

== Charts ==
=== Weekly charts ===
Chart (1987)	Peak position
US Hot Country Songs (Billboard)	1
Canadian RPM Country Tracks Chart	1

=== Year-end charts ===
Chart (1987)	Position
US Hot Country Songs (Billboard)	35
