= Only When I Love =

Single by Holly Dunn

from the album Cornerstone
- B-side: "Little Frame House"
- Released: August 29, 1987
- Genre: Country
- Length: 3:32
- Label: MTM
- Songwriter(s): Holly Dunn, Tom Shapiro, Chris Waters
- Producer(s): Tommy West

Holly Dunn singles chronology
| "Love Someone Like Me" (1987) | "Only When I Love" (1987) | "Strangers Again" (1988) |

"Only When I Love" is a song co-written and recorded by American country music artist Holly Dunn. It was released in August 1987 as the second single from the album Cornerstone. The song reached #4 on the Billboard Hot Country Singles & Tracks chart. It was written by Dunn, Tom Shapiro and Chris Waters.

== Chart performance ==
| Chart (1987) | Peak position |
|---|---|
| US Hot Country Songs (Billboard) | 4 |
| Canadian RPM Country Tracks | 7 |
