= I'm Gonna Miss You, Girl =

Single by Michael Martin Murphey

from the album River of Time
- B-side: "Talkin' to the Wrong Man"
- Released: October 1987
- Genre: Country
- Length: 3:43
- Label: Warner Bros.
- Songwriter(s): Jesse Winchester
- Producer(s): Steve Gibson

Michael Martin Murphey singles chronology
| "A Long Line of Love" (1987) | "I'm Gonna Miss You, Girl" (1987) | "Talkin' to the Wrong Man" (1988) |

"I'm Gonna Miss You, Girl" is a song written by Jesse Winchester, and recorded by American country music artist Michael Martin Murphey. It was released in October 1987 as the lead single from the album River of Time, peaking at number 3 on the U.S. Billboard Hot Country Singles chart and at number 4 on the Canadian RPM Country Tracks chart.

== Charts ==
=== Weekly charts ===
| Chart (1987–1988) | Peak position |
|---|---|
| US Hot Country Songs (Billboard) | 3 |
| Canadian RPM Country Tracks | 4 |

=== Year-end charts ===
| Chart (1988) | Position |
|---|---|
| US Hot Country Songs (Billboard) | 41 |
