= The Blue Rose of Texas =

Studio album by Holly Dunn
- Released: July 10, 1989
- Genre: Country
- Label: Warner Bros. Nashville
- Producer: Holly Dunn; Chris Waters

Holly Dunn chronology
Across the Rio Grande (1988)	The Blue Rose of Texas (1989)	Heart Full of Love (1990)

Singles from The Blue Rose of Texas
- 1. "Are You Ever Gonna Love Me" Released: May 1989; 2. "There Goes My Heart Again" Released: September 23, 1989

Professional ratings
Review scores
Source	Rating
Allmusic	3/5 stars

The Blue Rose of Texas is the fourth studio album by American country music artist Holly Dunn, and the first with the Warner Bros. Records label. A single from this album, "Are You Ever Gonna Love Me", was her first number 1 Billboard country single. Another major hit from the album was the fourth track, "There Goes My Heart Again". Dolly Parton provides supporting vocals on her own "Most of All, Why" and Joe Diffie provides backing vocals on "There Goes My Heart Again" a song he had a part in writing. Dunn co-produced the album with her brother, Chris Waters.

== Track listing ==
No.	Title	Writer(s)	Length
1.	"Are You Ever Gonna Love Me"	Holly Dunn, Tom Shapiro, Chris Waters	2:38
2.	"You're Still Keeping Me Up at Night"	Dunn, Shapiro, Waters	3:32
3.	"Most of All, Why"	Dolly Parton	3:05
4.	"Thunder and Lightnin'"	Val & Birdie, Vince Melamed	2:59
5.	"No One Takes the Train Anymore"	Waters	4:07
6.	"The Blue Rose of Texas"	Dunn, Shapiro, Waters	2:43
7.	"Sometime Today"	Dunn, Shapiro, Waters	3:18
8.	"There Goes My Heart Again"	Lonnie Wilson, Wayne Perry, Joe Diffie	2:42
9.	"If I'd Never Loved You"	Dunn	2:41
10.	"There's No Heart So Strong"	Paul Overstreet, Don Schlitz	3:36

== Personnel ==
Compiled from the liner notes.

Musicians

- Eddie Bayers – drums
- Mark Casstevens – acoustic guitar, mandolin, harmonica
- Holly Dunn – lead vocals
- Paul Franklin – pedal steel guitar, lap steel guitar, Dobro, Pedabro
- Steve Gibson – electric guitar, acoustic guitar, mandolin
- Rob Hajacos – fiddle
- Roy Huskey, Jr. – upright bass
- Chris Leuzinger – acoustic guitar, electric guitar
- Farrell Morris – marimba
- Phil Naish – keyboards
- Glenn Worf – bass guitar

Background vocalists

- Joe Diffie, Holly Dunn, Dolly Parton, Lee Satterfield, Chris Waters, Dennis Wilson, Curtis Young, Liana Young

Technical

- Holly Dunn – production
- Mike Psanos – engineering, mixing
- Chris Waters – production
- Hank Williams – mastering

== Chart performance ==
Chart (1989)	Peak position
U.S. Billboard Top Country Albums	30
