= Love Someone Like Me =

Single by Holly Dunn

from the album Cornerstone
- B-side: "Burnin' Wheel"
- Released: May 2, 1987
- Genre: Country
- Length: 3:14
- Label: MTM
- Songwriter(s): Holly Dunn, Radney Foster
- Producer(s): Tommy West

Holly Dunn singles chronology
"A Face in the Crowd" (1987)	"Love Someone Like Me" (1987)	"Only When I Love" (1987)

"Love Someone Like Me" is a song co-written and recorded by American country music artist Holly Dunn. It was released in May 1987 as the first single from the album Cornerstone. The song reached #2 on the Billboard Hot Country Singles & Tracks chart. The song was written by Dunn and Radney Foster.

== Charts ==
=== Weekly charts ===
Chart (1987)	Peak position
US Hot Country Songs (Billboard)	2
Canadian RPM Country Tracks	2

=== Year-end charts ===
Chart (1987)	Position
US Hot Country Songs (Billboard)	26
