= The Family Next Door =

The Family Next Door may refer to:

== Film and television ==
- The Family Next Door (1912 film), directed by Romaine Fielding
- The Family Next Door (1939 film), directed by Joseph Santley
- "The Family Next Door", a 1979 episode of the TV series All in the Family
- "The Family Next Door", an episode of the Evangelical Christian radio series Adventures in Odyssey
- The Family Next Door (Australian TV series), 2025 Australian TV series based on the novel by Sally Hepworth

== Literature ==
- The Family Next Door, a 2008 book by Jackie Diamond Hyman
- The Family Next Door, a 2018 book by Sally Hepworth
- The Family Next Door, a 2019 book by John Glatt

== Other uses ==
- The Family Next Door, a comic strip created by Bob Satterfield (cartoonist) (1875–1958)
- "The Family Next Door", a track on the 1994 album Buddha by American rock band Blink-182

== See also ==
- Boy Next Door (disambiguation)
- Girl Next Door (disambiguation)
- The House Next Door (disambiguation)
- The Man Next Door (disambiguation)
- The Woman Next Door (disambiguation)
