= 3 Doors Down Café and Lounge =

Italian restaurant in Portland, Oregon, U.S.

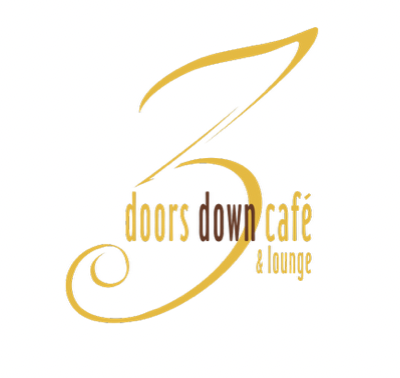

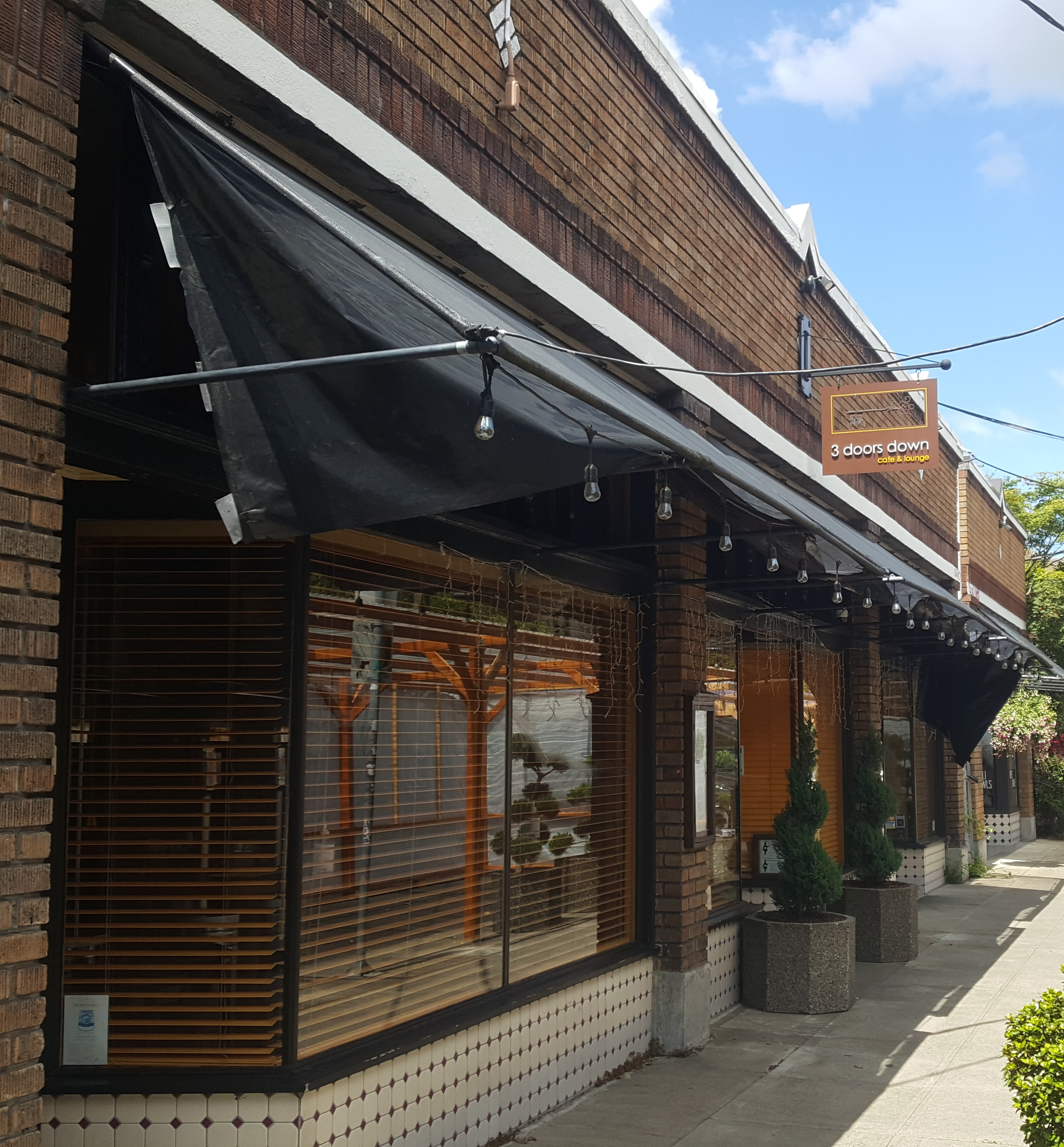
- The restaurant's exterior and enclosed patio in 2021, during the COVID-19 pandemic
- Interactive map of 3 Doors Down Café and Lounge

Restaurant information
- Established: 1994
- Owners: Michael Galloway; Jeff Saulsbury; Jason Stratton
- Previous owners: Kathy Bergin; Dave Marth
- Food type: Italian
- Location: 1429 Southeast 37th Avenue, Portland, Multnomah, Oregon, 97214, United States
- Coordinates: 45.5123°N 122.6260°W
- Website: 3doorsdowncafe.com

3 Doors Down Café and Lounge, or simply 3 Doors Down, was an Italian restaurant in Portland, Oregon, United States. It closed in 2024, before reopening in 2025. The business closed permanently in 2026.

== Description ==
3 Doors Down was an Italian restaurant on 37th Avenue in southeast Portland's Sunnyside neighborhood, just north of Hawthorne Boulevard. Alex Frane of Eater Portland described the restaurant as "an Italian mainstay in the city for decades", with a large enclosed patio, as of late 2021. He wrote in 2021, "The restaurant sticks to playful, comforting takes on familiar styles, including its baked orecchiette with eggplant ragu, aromatic shellfish fettucini, and creamy, slightly spicy ziti with sweet Italian sausage." According to Thrillist, 3 Doors Down had a large menu and "an extensive and dynamic" wine list.

Fodor's said, "Three doors down a side street from the bustling Hawthorne Boulevard, this small restaurant is known for its high-quality Italian food and extensive happy hour list. The intimate, unpretentious trattoria has built a reliable clientele with consistently well-crafted plates like lemon-zest-and-ricotta-stuffed eggplant with marinara, panko-crusted Oregon fried oysters and aioli, and a risotto of sautéed kale, sweet corn, and aged Gouda. There's a good list of reasonably priced wines, too."

== History ==
3 Doors Down opened in 1994. Kathy Bergin and Dave Marth owned and operated the restaurant for approximately 25 years. The business was sold to Michael Galloway and Jeff Saulsbury in 2019. Jason Stratton became a third partner in 2019.

Zach Beach was the chef de cuisine in 2021. The restaurant offered a three course dinner for New Year's Eve in 2021; menu options included roasted beets and arugula or radicchio salad, duck confit with ricotta cavatelli and braised kale, butternut squash gnocchi, New York strip, and pan-seared scallops.

The restaurant closed in 2024. In May 2025, Marth confirmed plans for 3 Doors Down to reopen later in the year. In February 2026, the business announced plans to close permanently.

== Reception ==
Portland Monthly said: "Let's cut to the chase: The veal, beef, and pork meatballs served every Sunday with bucatini at this hidden (but always crowded) Italian eatery just off SE Hawthorne boulevard are the star of the show. Also try the ricotta and spinach dumplings—tiny balls of poached dough drizzled with a light, lemony cream sauce—or the roasted chicken with polenta." Alex Frane included 3 Doors Down in Eater Portland's 2022 list of fifteen "stellar" Italian restaurant in the city. He wrote, "3 Doors Down may not be as trendy as some of Portland's more recognizable Italian restaurants, but its dedicated following regularly returns for its old school-charm, sizable pasta dishes, and the deep wine list that made it a wine-industry hangout for years... Its gnocchi is a sleeper hit and the perfect way to kick off a meal." Michael Russell included 3 Doors Down in The Oregonian's list of the 21 "most painful" restaurant and bar closures of 2024.

== See also ==
- List of defunct restaurants of the United States
- List of Italian restaurants
