= The Shoppe =

American country music group

- Origin: Dallas, Texas, USA
- Genres: Country
- Years active: 1968 - 1998, 2012, 2013, 2018
- Labels: Rainbow Sound, NSD, American Country, MTM
- Past members: Mark Cathey; Kevin Bailey; Roger Ferguson; Clarke Wilcox; Mike Caldwell; Jack Wilcox; Lou Chavez

The Shoppe was an American country music group from Dallas, Texas, composed of Mark Cathey (vocals), Kevin Bailey (vocals), Roger Ferguson (guitar), Clarke Wilcox (banjo), Mike Caldwell (harmonica), Jack Wilcox (bass), and Lou Chavez (drums).

The band's highest-charting single, "Doesn't Anybody Get High on Love Anymore," reached the Top 40 on the Billboard Hot Country Singles chart in 1981. They were signed to MTM Records in 1985 and released one album, The Shoppe, which charted on the Billboard Top Country Albums chart and led to appearances on The Nashville Network.

For nearly three decades, The Shoppe toured extensively throughout the United States before disbanding in 1998.

For many years The Shoppe was a mainstay at the Puyallup Fair, performing several times a day.

In 2012 The Shoppe reunited for a reunion run at the Puyallup Fair, from September 17 to September 23. They would also reunite for the Puyallup fair in 2013, and one final time in 2018 to celebrate their 50th anniversary.

== Limited discography ==
=== Albums ===
Year	Album	Peak positions	Label
Year	Album	US Country	Label
1980	Tryin' to Get It Straight	—	Rainbow Sound (R-5059)
1985	The Shoppe	70	MTM (ST-71051)
1986	The Shoppe	—	The Shoppe Records (S-86)
1998	Along for the Ride	—	Midwest Records (SHP-1008)

=== Singles ===
Year	Single	Peak positions	Album
Year	Single	US Country	Album
1980	"Three Way Love"	76	Tryin' to Get It Straight
1980	"Star Studded Nights"	78	Tryin' to Get It Straight
1981	"Doesn't Anybody Get High on Love Anymore"	33	Single-only releases
1981	"Dream Maker"	61	Single-only releases
1984	"If You Think I Love You Now"	74	Single-only releases
1985	"Hurts All Over"	79	Single-only releases
1985	"Holdin' the Family Together"	56	The Shoppe
1985	"While the Moon's in Town"	47	The Shoppe
