= There Goes My Heart Again =

Single by Holly Dunn

from the album The Blue Rose of Texas
- B-side: "The Blue Rose of Texas"
- Released: September 23, 1989
- Genre: Country
- Length: 2:38
- Label: Warner Bros. Nashville
- Songwriters: Joe Diffie, Lonnie Wilson, Wayne Perry
- Producers: Holly Dunn, Chris Waters

Holly Dunn singles chronology
"Are You Ever Gonna Love Me" (1989)	"There Goes My Heart Again" (1989)	"Maybe" (1990)

"There Goes My Heart Again" is a song recorded by American country music artist Holly Dunn. It was released in September 1989 as the second single from the album The Blue Rose of Texas. The song reached #4 on the Billboard Hot Country Singles & Tracks chart. Joe Diffie, who co-wrote the song with Lonnie Wilson and Wayne Perry, sings backing vocals on it.

== Chart performance ==
Chart (1989)	Peak position
Canada Country Singles (RPM)	8
US Hot Country Songs (Billboard)	4
