= Kate Welsh =

American novelist

- Born: United States
- Occupation: Novelist
- Writing career
- Period: 1998–present
- Genre: Romance

Kate Welsh is an American author of contemporary romance novels.

Welsh suffers from eye muscle problems that gave her difficulties in reading. Although she had never read a book for pleasure, her husband encouraged her to try to write a book. In reading over what she had written, Welsh exercised her eye muscles, helping them to become strong and resolving many of her reading issues.

While working to become published, Welsh joined the Romance Writers of America. Because of her own difficulties in reading, Welsh was interested in working on literacy projects. In 1996, she chaired the RWA's Readers for Life Literacy book signing. The same year, she received the RWA regional service award for her work on literacy issues.

Welsh's first novel, For the Sake of Her Child, was published in 1998 by Harlequin's Steeple Hill imprint in their Love Inspired line of category romances. She has been nominated four times for Romantic Times Reviewers' Choice Awards.

== Bibliography ==
=== Novels ===
- For the Sake of Her Child (1998)
- Never Lie to an Angel (1999)
- A Family for Christmas (1999)
- Small-Town Dreams (2000)
- Their Forever Love (2000)
- The Girl Next Door (2001)
- Silver Lining (2002)
- Mountain Laurel (2002)
- A Love Beyond (2003)
- Her Perfect Match (2003)
- Substitute Daddy (2003)
- Home to Safe Harbor (2003)
- Abiding Love (2004)
- Autumn Promises (2004)
- Redeeming Travis (2004)
- Joy in His Heart (2005)
- The Doctor's Secret Child (2006)
- A Bargain Called Marriage (2007)
- For Jessie's Sake (2008)

=== Omnibus ===
- Where the Heart Is (2003) (with Irene Brand, Marta Perry)
