= You Really Had Me Going =

Single by Holly Dunn

from the album Heart Full of Love
- B-side: "Where No Place Is Home"
- Released: September 1, 1990
- Genre: Country
- Length: 2:49
- Label: Warner Bros. Nashville
- Songwriters: Holly Dunn; Chris Waters; Tom Shapiro
- Producers: Holly Dunn; Chris Waters

Holly Dunn singles chronology
"My Anniversary for Being a Fool" (1990)	"You Really Had Me Going" (1990)	"Heart Full of Love" (1991)

"You Really Had Me Going" is a song co-written and recorded by American country music artist Holly Dunn. It was released in September 1990 as the first single from the album Heart Full of Love. The song was Dunn's second and final number one on the country chart. The single went to number one for one week and spent a total of 20 weeks on the country chart. The song was written by Dunn, Tom Shapiro and Chris Waters.

== Chart performance ==
Chart (1990)	Peak position
Canada Country Singles (RPM)	1
US Hot Country Songs (Billboard)	1

=== Year-end charts ===
Chart (1990)	Position
Canada Country Tracks (RPM)	22
