= Girls Next Door =

American country music group

- Origin: Nashville, Tennessee, United States
- Genres: Country
- Years active: 1982–1991, 2011, 2023–present
- Labels: MTM, Atlantic
- Members: Diane Williams Austin; Doris King Merritt; Cindy Nixon Psanos; Tammy Stephens Smith

Girls Next Door are an American country music vocal group formed in Nashville, Tennessee, in 1982. The group consists of vocalists Doris King Merritt, Cindy Nixon Psanos, Diane Williams Austin, and Tammy Stephens Smith. The quartet recorded between 1982 and 1991, issuing two albums on MTM Records and one on Atlantic Records. They disbanded in 1991 and briefly reunited in 2011 before reuniting a second time in 2023.

== History ==
Girls Next Door was founded in 1982 by record producer Tommy West, best known for working with Jim Croce. West was a friend of session vocalist Doris King, and suggested that she form an all-female vocal group due to the concept being uncommon in country music at the time. The other members chosen for the group were Cindy Nixon, Diane Williams, and Tammy Stephens. All four of the members had met through mutual connections at Opryland USA, a former theme park in Nashville, Tennessee, which often employed musicians to perform there. They originally wanted to call themselves Belle and Wildflower, but after finding that other groups existed with those names, West suggested "Girls Next Door" after a song he wrote.

The four began rehearsing in Williams's basement and went on to record several songs with West. Despite not having a record deal at the time, they also began performing in local bars around Nashville. In 1984, the quartet was signed to MTM Records, a record label division of actress Mary Tyler Moore's MTM Enterprises. MTM released the group's self-titled debut album The Girls Next Door in 1984, with West producing. It charted four singles on the Billboard Hot Country Songs charts. First was "Love Will Get You Through Times of No Money" at number fourteen, followed by their most successful, "Slow Boat to China" at number eight. "Baby I Want It" and "Walk Me in the Rain" were also issued as singles. Girls Next Door's second album What a Girl Next Door Could Do charted singles with its title track and "Easy to Find", but neither made top 40 on the country charts. A seventh single for MTM, "Love and Other Fairy Tales", was never put on an album due to MTM closing soon afterward.

In 1989, Girls Next Door signed with Atlantic Records for their third album How 'Bout Us under the production of Nelson Larkin. It charted the singles "He's Gotta Have Me" and "How 'Bout Us", a cover of Champaign's 1981 single. These singles also failed to make top 40 on the country charts. Girls Next Door retired in 1991, after a performance on the talk show Nashville Now. All four members stated at the time that they wanted to raise their families.

The original four members reunited for one concert in 2011. In 2023, the original four members reunited to release a new album titled Now or Never, which they funded through Kickstarter. The album contains the single "What's This Thing You've Got About Leaving", released that same year.

== Discography ==
=== Albums ===
Year	Album	US Country	Label
1986	The Girls Next Door	30	MTM
1987	What a Girl Next Door Could Do	42	MTM
1990	How 'Bout Us	69	Atlantic
2023	Now or Never	—	Self-released

=== Singles ===
Year	Single	Peak positions	Album
Year	Single	US Country	Album
1986	"Love Will Get You Through Times of No Money"	14	The Girls Next Door
1986	"Slow Boat to China"	8	The Girls Next Door
1986	"Baby I Want It"	26	The Girls Next Door
1987	"Walk Me in the Rain"	28	The Girls Next Door
1987	"What a Girl Next Door Could Do"	43	What a Girl Next Door Could Do
1987	"Easy to Find"	57	What a Girl Next Door Could Do
1988	"Love and Other Fairy Tales"	73	—N/a
1989	"He's Gotta Have Me"	54	How 'Bout Us
1990	"Maybe You Wouldn't Be Missin' Me Tonight"	—	How 'Bout Us
1990	"How 'Bout Us"	71	How 'Bout Us
2023	"What's This Thing You've Got About Leaving"	—	Now or Never
"—" denotes releases that did not chart

=== Music videos ===
Year	Single	Director
1986	"Slow Boat to China"	
1986	"Baby I Want It"	Coke Sams
