= Boy Next Door =

Boy Next Door or variants may refer to:

== Film ==
- The Boy Next Door (film), a 2015 erotic thriller
- The Boys Next Door (1985 film), starring Charlie Sheen
- The Boys Next Door (1996 film), a television drama based on the eponymous 1988 play

== Television ==
- "Boy Next Door", Ally McBeal season 6, episode 16 (2000)
- "Le Boy Next Door", Fancy Nancy season 2, episode 15a (2020)
- "The Boy Next Door", ALF season 2, episode 14 (1988)
- "The Boy Next Door", Double Trouble season 2, episode 6 (1985)
- "The Boy Next Door", Empty Nest season 3, episode 8 (1990)
- "The Boy Next Door", For the Record season 10, episode 1 (1985)
- "The Boy Next Door", Joe Forrester episode 22 (1976)
- "The Boy Next Door", Medium season 3, episode 15 (2007)
- "The Boy Next Door", On the Case with Paula Zahn season 1, episode 13 (2010)
- "The Boy Next Door", Private Secretary season 3, episode 26 (1955)
- "The Boy Next Door", Star of the Family episode 8 (1982)
- "The Boy Next Door", Tales of Little Women episode 15 (1987)
- "The Boy Next Door", The Bob Newhart Show season 4, episode 23 (1976)
- "The Boy Next Door", The Patty Duke Show season 2, episode 6 (1964)
- "The Boy Next Door", To Rome with Love season 2, episode 11 (1970)
- "The Boys Next Door", Family Ties season 6, episode 25 (1988)
- "Ze Boy Next Door", Sophie season 1, episode 8 (2008)

== Literature ==
- The Boy Next Door, a 1944 novel by Enid Blyton
- The Boy Next Door, a 1956 novel by Betty Cavanna
- The Boy Next Door, a 1995 novel by Janet Quin-Harkin
- "The Boy Next Door", a 1991 short story by Ellen Emerson White from Thirteen in the Point Horror series
- The Boy Next Door, a 1995 novel by Sinclair Smith from the Point Horror series
- The Boy Next Door, a Fear Street book by R. L. Stine
- The Boy Next Door (novel), by Meg Cabot, 2002
- The Boys Next Door, a 2007 novel by Jennifer Echols
- The Boy Next Door, a 2009 novel by Irene Sabatini
- The Boy Next Door, a 2016 novel by Kate McMurray
- Boy's Next Door, a 1998 one-volume manga by Kaori Yuki
- The Boys Next Door (play), a 1988 play by Tom Griffin

== Music ==
- BoyNextDoor, a South Korean boy group
- The Boy Next Door (DJ), Dutch DJ and record producer
- The Boys Next Door, later The Birthday Party, an Australian band
- "Boy Next Door" (song), by Jamelia, 2000
- The Boy Next Door (album), by Stacey Kent, 2003
- "The Boy Next Door" (song), by Hugh Martin and Ralph Blane, 1944

== Other uses ==
- Boy next door (stock character), similar to Girl next door

== See also ==
- Girl Next Door (disambiguation)
- The House Next Door (disambiguation)
- The Family Next Door (disambiguation)
- The Man Next Door (disambiguation)
- The Woman Next Door (disambiguation)
- Not the Boy Next Door, a 1983 album and its title track by Peter Allen
  - Peter Allen: Not the Boy Next Door, a 2015 Australian TV mini-series
