= A Face in the Crowd (Michael Martin Murphey and Holly Dunn song) =

Single by Michael Martin Murphey with Holly Dunn

from the album Americana
- B-side: "You're History"
- Released: January 1987
- Genre: Country
- Length: 4:09
- Label: Warner Bros.
- Songwriter(s): Karen Staley, Gary Harrison
- Producer(s): Steve Gibson

Michael Martin Murphey singles chronology
"Fiddlin' Man" (1986)	"A Face in the Crowd" (1987)	"A Long Line of Love" (1987)

Holly Dunn singles chronology
"Daddy's Hands" (1986)	"A Face in the Crowd" (1987)	"Love Someone Like Me" (1987)

"A Face in the Crowd" is a song written by Karen Staley and Gary Harrison, and recorded by American country music artists Michael Martin Murphey and Holly Dunn. It was released in January 1987 as the first single from Murphey's album Americana. The song reached number 4 on the Billboard Hot Country Singles & Tracks chart and number 7 on the Canadian RPM Country Tracks chart.

== Chart performance ==
Chart (1987)	Peak position
US Hot Country Songs (Billboard)	4
Canadian RPM Country Tracks	7
