= Americana (Michael Martin Murphey album) =

Studio album by Michael Martin Murphey
- Released: March 4, 1987
- Recorded: 1986
- Genre: Country
- Length: 37:18
- Label: Warner Bros.
- Producer: Jim Ed Norman

Michael Martin Murphey chronology
Tonight We Ride (1986)	Americana (1987)	River of Time (1988)

Singles from Americana
- 1. "A Face in the Crowd" Released: January 1987; 2. "A Long Line of Love" Released: April 1987

Americana is the thirteenth studio album by American singer-songwriter Michael Martin Murphey and his second for Warner Bros. Records. Murphey found a receptive home with the label and began a long association with the label's president and resident producer, Jim Ed Norman. Unlike his previous albums, Americana contains material written mainly by other writers—Murphey only wrote or co-wrote three of the songs. The album's notable tracks include the #1 hit "A Long Line of Love" and the #4 "Face in the Crowd", the latter a duet with singer Holly Dunn. The album peaked at number 32 on the Billboard Top Country Albums chart.

== Track listing ==
No.	Title	Writer(s)	Length
1.	"A Face in the Crowd" (duet with Holly Dunn)	Gary Harrison, Karen Staley	4:09
2.	"A Long Line of Love"	Paul Overstreet, Thom Schuyler	3:27
3.	"Once Upon a Time"	Michael Martin Murphey, David Hoffner	5:24
4.	"Out of Touch"	Wayland Holyfield, Peter McCann	2:52
5.	"Almost Free"	Hugh Prestwood	3:27
6.	"Worlds Apart"	Murphey	3:56
7.	"No One Else But You"	Hoffner, Bill Miller	3:55
8.	"You're History"	Murphey, Hoffner	3:22
9.	"My Darling Wherever You Are"	Bob DiPiero, Michael Mugrage, John Scott Sherrill	4:01
10.	"I'm Never Gonna Let You Go"	Bob Corbin	3:04

== Credits ==
Music

- Michael Martin Murphey – lead vocals, acoustic guitar
- Lloyd Green – steel guitar
- Reggie Young – electric guitar
- Josh Goin – electric guitar
- Larry Byrom – acoustic guitar
- Billy Joe Walker, Jr. – acoustic guitar, electric guitar
- Mark Casstevens – acoustic guitar
- Josh Leo – electric guitar
- Steve Gibson – banjo, producer, acoustic guitar, electric guitar
- John Jarvis – piano
- Dennis Burnside – piano, synthesizer
- David Hoffner – piano, synthesizer
- Mike Lawler – synthesizer
- Dave Innis – synthesizer
- Barry Green – trombone
- George Tidwell – trumpet
- Buddy Skipper – clarinet
- Jim Horn – saxophone
- Michael Rhodes – bass
- Mike Brignardello – bass
- Eddie Bayers – drums
- Tommy Wells – drums
- Holly Dunn – vocals on “A Face in the Crowd”
- Gary Musick – background vocals
- Thomas Flora – background vocals
- Jim Photoglo – background vocals
- Ned Wimmer – background vocals
- Michael Lunn – background vocals
- Gary Janney – background vocals

Production

- Jim Ed Norman – producer

== Chart performance ==
Chart (1987)	Peak position
U.S. Billboard Top Country Albums	32
