= Bill Caswell =

American singer-songwriter

Bill Caswell was a country music singer-songwriter and musician active since the early 1980s. Together with his wife Rosi Caswell, the duo from Bartlesville, Oklahoma perform on rare old style instruments including the ukelin, mandolin-guitar, bell-harp, and tremoloa. In the 1980s he performed his music on television in Hee Haw and on live radio in A Prairie Home Companion. The two together performed at Dollywood in Gatlinburg, Tennessee for five seasons.

Bill began his career in the early 1980s as a songwriting protégé of Rodney Crowell and developed a reputation as one of the best songwriters in the business. Working for Tree Record, as a staff writer. He co-wrote KENTUCKY HOMEMADE CHRISTMAS with Kin Vassy. Kenny Rogers included the song on his first Christmas album. It went "Platinum" in 3 weeks.

His recent albums include Oklahoma Backroads and Love Lost and Found.

In 1983, Bill Caswell appeared along with Crowell on the PBS music television program Austin City Limits for a "Songwriters Showcase" episode.

Bill co-wrote some songs with other top country songwriters, such as Alan Rhody, with "Just When" which was recorded by George Jones on his 1985 album Who's Gonna Fill Their Shoes?, and "Somebody To Care", recorded by Tanya Tucker on her 1986 album Girls Like Me.

In recent years, Bill and Rosi Caswell performed at the September 30 to October 2, 1999, annual Oklahoma International Bluegrass Festival in Guthrie, Oklahoma.

Died February 16, 2023 in Bartlesville Oklahoma.
