= Daddy's Hands =

Single by Holly Dunn

from the album Holly Dunn
- B-side: "Hideaway Heart"
- Released: August 23, 1986
- Genre: Country
- Length: 3:29
- Label: MTM
- Songwriter: Holly Dunn
- Producer: Tommy West

Holly Dunn singles chronology
"Two Too Many" (1986)	"Daddy's Hands" (1986)	"A Face in the Crowd" (1987)

"Daddy's Hands" is a song written and recorded by American country music artist Holly Dunn. It was released in August 1986 as the third and final single from the album Holly Dunn. The song reached #7 on the Billboard Hot Country Singles & Tracks chart.

== Content ==
The song is a tribute to Dunn's father, who was a minister. The song is composed in the key of D major with a moderate tempo in cut time. The main chord pattern is D-A-Bm-G, with a vocal range of A_{3} to B_{4}. Dunn noted that she did not seek to make anything beyond a Father's Day gift for her father, but she "tapped into a well of emotion". She also noted that the song received very positive reception from fans and listeners, and observed from the song's success that "people like hearing about a family relationship that's stable and loving."

Dunn received two Grammy Award nominations in 1987 for the song: for Grammy Award for Best Female Country Vocal Performance, and for Grammy Award for Best Country Song.

The song was also recorded by The Whites on their 1985 album Whole New World.

== Chart performance ==
Chart (1986)	Peak position
US Hot Country Songs (Billboard)	7
