= Holly Dunn =

American singer-songwriter (1957–2016)

- Promotional image of Holly Dunn, 1995
- Born: Holly Suzette Dunn; August 22, 1957; San Antonio, Texas, U.S.
- Died: November 14, 2016 (aged 59); Albuquerque, New Mexico, U.S.
- Education: Abilene Christian College
- Occupations: Singer; songwriter
- Spouse: Melissa Taylor
- Relatives: Chris Waters (brother)
- Musical career
- Genres: Country
- Years active: 1985–2003
- Labels: MTM; Warner Bros.; River North; Oms

Holly Suzette Dunn (August 22, 1957 – November 14, 2016) was an American country music singer and songwriter. Dunn recorded for MTM Records between 1985 and 1988, Warner Bros. Records between 1988 and 1993, and River North Records between 1995 and 1997. She released 10 albums and charted 19 singles, plus two duets on the Hot Country Songs charts. Two of her single releases, "Are You Ever Gonna Love Me" and "You Really Had Me Going", went to No. 1 on that chart. Other songs for which she is known include "Daddy's Hands" and "Maybe I Mean Yes". Dunn's brother, Chris Waters, is a songwriter and record producer, having worked with both his sister and other artists in these capacities. Dunn retired from music in 2003, and died of ovarian cancer in 2016.

== Biography ==
=== Early years and MTM Records ===
Holly Suzette Dunn was born August 22, 1957. Her parents were a Church of Christ preacher and a landscape painter.

While attending high school, Dunn performed in a band called Freedom Folk Singers, which toured the Southern United States. She attended Abilene Christian University and performed in a school-sponsored group called The Hilltoppers. Dunn also wrote songs with her brother, Chris Waters, who later became a prolific songwriter in Nashville, Tennessee. One of their collaborations, "Out of Sight, Not Out of Mind", was recorded by Cristy Lane. After graduating from college, Dunn moved to Nashville, where she worked as a demo singer before both Waters and she became songwriters at CBS Records, and then MTM Records. Louise Mandrell had a top-10 hit in 1984 with "I'm Not Through Loving You Yet", which the two co-wrote. By 1985, Dunn was signed to a record contract with MTM.

Dunn's first two releases — "Playing for Keeps" and "My Heart Holds On" — both failed to make the Top 40 on the Hot Country Songs charts, while "Two Too Many" peaked at No. 39. Her first Top 10 hit came in 1986, when "Daddy's Hands", a tribute to her father, peaked at No. 7 on that chart. Dunn, who wrote "Daddy's Hands" single-handedly, noted that the song's success led to many fans sharing positive experiences about their own fathers with her. The song was included on her self-titled debut, from which it served as the final single. Following this song, she sang guest vocals on Michael Martin Murphey's Top 5 hit "A Face in the Crowd", from his album Americana. She was named the Academy of Country Music's Top New Female Vocalist in 1986, and then the winner of Country Music Association's Horizon Award in 1987.

Her second MTM album, Cornerstone, produced three straight top-10 hits in "Love Someone Like Me", "Only When I Love", and "Strangers Again". Across the Rio Grande in 1988 included the singles "That's What Your Love Does to Me" and "(It's Always Gonna Be) Someday", before MTM Records filed for bankruptcy and closed.

=== Warner Bros. Records, Grand Ole Opry, River North Records ===
In 1989, Dunn moved to Warner Bros. Records' Nashville division. Her first release for the label, The Blue Rose of Texas, produced her first number-one hit in "Are You Ever Gonna Love Me", followed by "There Goes My Heart Again" at number four. The latter was co-written by a then-unknown Joe Diffie, who also sang backing vocals on it. She also became a member of the Grand Ole Opry in 1989. She also sang on Kenny Rogers' late 1990 hit "Maybe", from his album Something Inside So Strong.

Dunn's second Warner Bros. album, Heart Full of Love, was released in 1990. Although its lead single "My Anniversary for Being a Fool" failed to make the top 40, the followup "You Really Had Me Going" became her second and final number-one hit, while the title track was a top-20 hit.

In 1991, Dunn released her first greatest hits package, Milestones: Greatest Hits. It included the new release "Maybe I Mean Yes", which became controversial due to some listeners interpreting the song as condoning date rape. As a result, Dunn asked for the single to be withdrawn from rotation. Her final Warner Bros. release, Getting It Dunn, failed to produce a top-40 hit, and she exited the label in 1993.

Dunn signed to River North Records in 1995 and released two albums for the label: Life and Love and All the Stages in 1995 and Leave One Bridge Standing two years later. The former produced her final chart entry in "I Am Who I Am". Shortly before the release of Leave One Bridge Standing, she joined country music radio station WWWW in Detroit, Michigan, as morning show co-host. It was not her first time behind the radio mike, as she had served as a DJ during her college years. However, the decision forced her to give up touring for a time. Later, she co-hosted Opry Backstage on the Nashville Network in 1999–2002.

=== Retirement and death ===
In 2003, Dunn announced her retirement from her musical career and released her final album, Full Circle, which was her only gospel album, to devote full-time to her other passion, art. Her paintings deal primarily with subjects from the Southwestern United States.

On November 14, 2016, Dunn died of ovarian cancer in Albuquerque, New Mexico, at age 59. At the time of her death, Dunn was married to Dr. Melissa Taylor.

== Discography ==
Studio albums

- Holly Dunn (1986)
- Cornerstone (1987)
- Across the Rio Grande (1988)
- The Blue Rose of Texas (1989)
- Heart Full of Love (1990)
- Getting It Dunn (1992)
- Life and Love and All the Stages (1995)
- Leave One Bridge Standing (1997)
- Full Circle (2003)

== Awards and nominations ==
=== Grammy Awards ===
Year	Nominee / work	Award	Result
1987	"Daddy's Hands"	Best Female Country Vocal Performance	Nominated
1987	"Daddy's Hands"	Best Country Song	Nominated
1988	"A Face in the Crowd"	Best Country Collaboration with Vocals	Nominated

=== TNN/Music City News Country Awards ===
Year	Nominee / work	Award	Result
1988	Holly Dunn	Female Artist of the Year	Nominated
1988	Holly Dunn	Star of Tomorrow	Nominated
1989	Holly Dunn	Star of Tomorrow	Nominated

=== Academy of Country Music Awards ===
Year	Nominee / work	Award	Result
1987	Holly Dunn	Top New Female Vocalist	Won

=== Country Music Association Awards ===
Year	Nominee / work	Award	Result
1987	"Daddy's Hands"	Song of the Year	Nominated
1987	Holly Dunn	Horizon Award	Won
1987	Holly Dunn and Michael Martin Murphy	Vocal Duo of the Year	Nominated
