= MTM Records =

Defunct American country music record label

- Parent company: MTM Enterprises
- Founded: 1984
- Founder: Mary Tyler Moore
- Defunct: 1988
- Status: Absorbed into RCA Nashville
- Distributor: Capitol Records
- Genre: Country, rock
- Country of origin: U.S.
- Location: Nashville, Tennessee

MTM Records was an American independent record label specializing in country music. It was founded in 1984 as a subsidiary of the production company of the same name owned by actress Mary Tyler Moore.

Alan Bernard was the label's CEO, Howard Stark was the label's President, and Tommy West, originally of the musical duo Cashman and West, was Senior Vice President (both Stark and West worked together at ABC Records in the 1970s); staff songwriters included Radney Foster and Bill Lloyd of Foster & Lloyd, as well as Larry Boone and Hugh Prestwood.

In its four years of existence, fifty-one singles on the MTM label charted on the Billboard country singles chart. The label also signed three rock music acts: The Metros from Minneapolis, Minnesota, who were discovered on Star Search; In Pursuit, a New Wave rock group, and The Voltage Brothers, a family R&B act from Rochester, NY. None of those groups' output charted.

After MTM Enterprises was sold to Britain's Television South PLC in July 1988, the label was purchased by and absorbed into RCA Nashville. Becky Hobbs, Paul Overstreet, and Judy Rodman were then transferred to RCA's roster. Holly Dunn signed with Warner Bros. Nashville, and her MTM masters went with her (Warner Bros. re-released the original MTM hit version of Dunn's hit, "Daddy's Hands," as the B-side of her 1991 single "Maybe I Mean Yes", and also Warner issued the Milestones: Greatest Hits compilation in 1991 featuring a mix of MTM and Warner Bros. hits, and in 2024, Warner released her MTM and Warner Bros. catalog to music streaming services and online music stores). The Girls Next Door signed with Atlantic Records, but their MTM hits were still owned by RCA, although the group had would briefly acquire the rights to their MTM recordings in 2024 and sell MP3 downloads on their website.

== Artist roster ==
- The Almost Brothers
- The Debonaires
- Holly Dunn
- Girls Next Door
- Marty Haggard
- Hege V
- Becky Hobbs
- In Pursuit
- The Metros
- Paul Overstreet
- Judy Rodman
- Ronnie Rogers
- S-K-O
- The Shoppe
- The Voltage Brothers
