= Chris Waters =

American singer-songwriter

- Born: Christopher Waters Dunn; San Antonio, Texas, U.S.
- Genre: Country
- Occupations: Singer-songwriter; culinary writer

Christopher Waters Dunn, known professionally as Chris Waters, is an American singer and songwriter, record producer, and culinary writer. He is the brother of the late country music singer Holly Dunn. Waters wrote and produced many of his sister's singles, and has written for acts such as Lonestar, Terri Clark, Rhett Akins, and Billy Dean among others.

== Biography ==
Christopher Waters Dunn was raised in San Antonio, Texas, and holds a master's degree in creative writing from the University of Denver. After graduation, he worked in Nashville, Tennessee, as a songwriter and record producer for over 25 years. He retired from the music business in 2005 to pursue other areas of creative writing. He graduated top of his class from the San Antonio campus of the Culinary Institute of America in May 2007. He is now a freelance culinary writer and adjunct instructor at the Culinary Institute of America in San Antonio.

== Songwriter ==
Known as Chris Waters in the music business, he co-wrote "Sexy Eyes" for Dr. Hook, which was certified gold by the RIAA.

He also co-wrote the number-one country songs "She Never Lets it Go to Her Heart" recorded by Tim McGraw, "You're Easy on the Eyes" and "When Boy Meets Girl" recorded by Terri Clark, "If Your Heart Ain't Busy Tonight" recorded by Tanya Tucker, "What I Really Meant to Say" recorded by Cyndi Thomson, and "You Really Had Me Going", which Waters co-wrote and co-produced with his sister, Holly Dunn.

Other BMI Award-winning songs he co-wrote include "Tequila Talkin'" recorded by Lonestar, "That Ain't My Truck" recorded by Rhett Akins, "Better Things to Do" recorded by Terri Clark, "Cadillac Ranch" recorded by Chris LeDoux, "Meant to Be" recorded by Sammy Kershaw, and "You Don't Count the Cost" by Billy Dean.

He co-produced Terri Clark's first two albums for Mercury Records, Terri Clark and Just the Same, which were both certified platinum by the RIAA.

He was named Sony/ATV Music Publishing, Nashville, Writer of the Year in 1997 and a BMI Writer of the Century in 1999.

== Culinary writer ==
As Chris Waters Dunn, he writes articles as the "Chef's Secrets" writer who regularly appears in the San Antonio Express-News.

He has written a book, with Cappy Lawton, entitled, Enchiladas: Aztec to TexMex, published by Trinity University Press.
