= Marty Robbins discography =

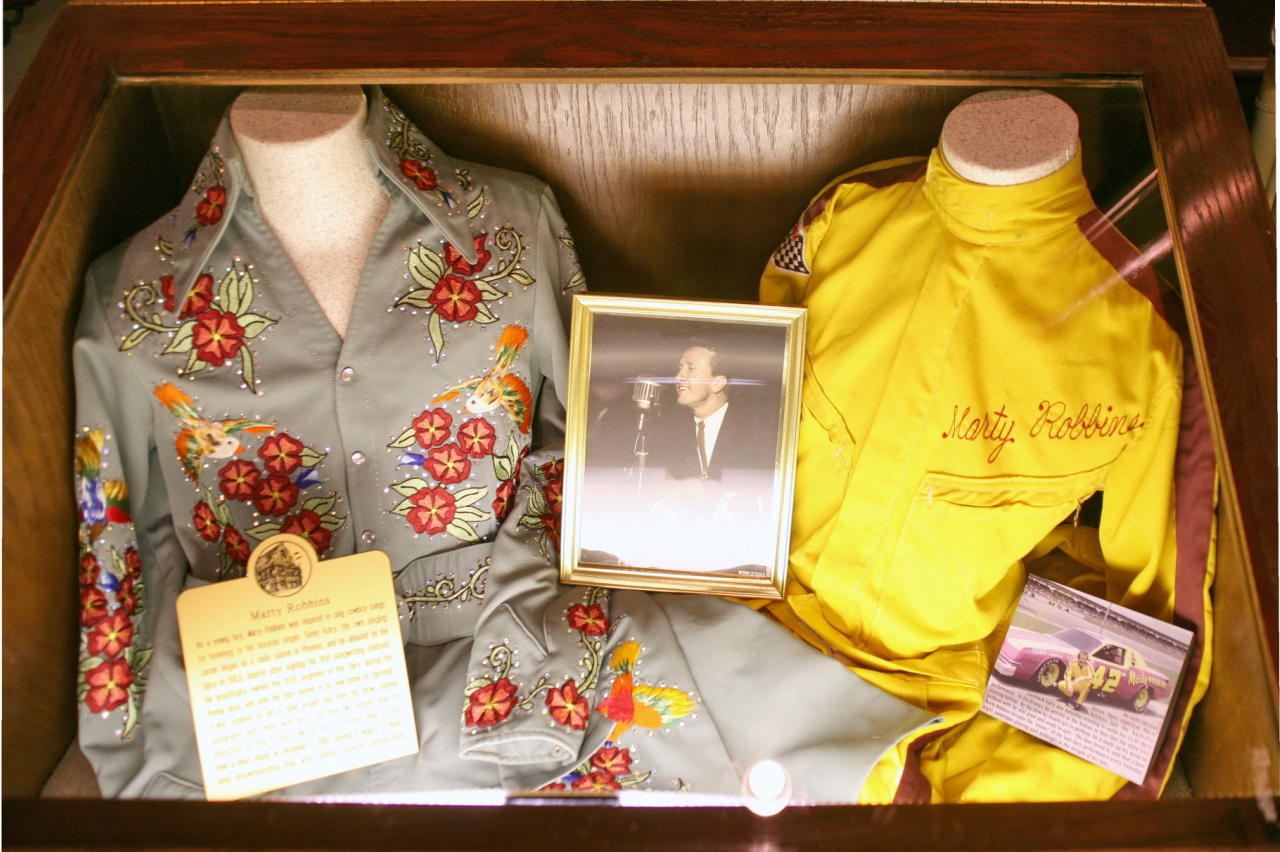
- Exhibit at Ryman Auditorium
- Studio albums: 52
- Compilation albums: 13
- Singles: 100
- No.1 Single: 17

The discography of American country music singer Marty Robbins consists of 52 studio albums, 13 compilation albums, and 100 singles. In his career, he charted 17 number-one singles on the Billboard Hot Country Songs charts as well as 82 top 40 singles.

Robbins' highest-charting album is 1959's Gunfighter Ballads and Trail Songs. It charted at number 6 on the Billboard 200 and was certified platinum by the RIAA. The album's first single, "El Paso", became a hit on both the country and pop charts, topping the Hot Country Songs and Billboard Hot 100 charts. While that was his only pop number-one hit, in 1957, "A White Sport Coat" charted at number 2, and in 1961, "Don't Worry" charted at number 3. His final top 10 single was "Honkytonk Man" in 1982, which is the title of the film Robbins had starred in. However, he died shortly before the release of the film. Since his death in 1982, four posthumous studio albums have been released, although they did not make an impact on the charts.

== Studio albums ==
=== 1950s albums ===
Title	Album details	Peak chart positions		Certifications (sales threshold)
Title	Album details	US	UK	Certifications (sales threshold)
Rock'n Roll'n Robbins	Release date: 1956; Label: Columbia Records	—	—	
The Song of Robbins	Release date: 1957; Label: Columbia Records	—	—	
Song of the Islands	Release date: 1957; Label: Columbia Records	—	—	
Marty Robbins	Release date: 1958; Label: Columbia Records	—	—	
Gunfighter Ballads and Trail Songs	Release date: September 1959; Label: Columbia Records	6	20	US: Platinum
"—" denotes releases that did not chart

=== 1960s albums ===
Title	Album details	Peak chart positions	
Title	Album details	US Country	US
More Gunfighter Ballads and Trail Songs	Release date: 1960; Label: Columbia Records	—	21
Just a Little Sentimental	Release date: 1961; Label: Columbia Records	—	—
Marty After Midnight	Release date: 1962; Label: Columbia Records	—	—
Portrait of Marty	Release date: 1962; Label: Columbia Records	—	—
Devil Woman	Release date: 1962; Label: Columbia Records	—	35
Hawaii's Calling Me	Release date: 1963; Label: Columbia Records	—	—
Return of the Gunfighter	Release date: 1963; Label: Columbia Records	6	—
Island Woman	Release date: 1964; Label: Columbia Records	—	—
R.F.D.	Release date: 1964; Label: Columbia Records	4	—
Turn the Lights Down Low	Release date: 1965; Label: Columbia Records	—	—
Saddle Tramp	Release date: 1966; Label: Columbia Records	—	—
What God Has Done	Release date: 1966; Label: Columbia Records	26	—
The Drifter	Release date: 1966; Label: Columbia Records	6	—
My Kind of Country	Release date: 1967; Label: Columbia Records	9	—
Tonight Carmen	Release date: 1967; Label: Columbia Records	4	—
By the Time I Get to Phoenix	Release date: 1968; Label: Columbia Records	8	—
The Bend In The River	Release date: 1968; Label: Columbia Musical Treasury	—	—
I Walk Alone	Release date: 1968; Label: Columbia Records	2	160
Singing the Blues	Release date: 1969; Label: Columbia Records	—	—
Country	Release date: 1969; Label: Columbia Records	20	—
It's a Sin	Release date: 1969; Label: Columbia Records	6	194
"—" denotes releases that did not chart

=== 1970s albums ===
Title	Album details	Peak chart positions		
Title	Album details	US Country	US	CAN Country
Story of My Life	Release date: 1970; Label: Columbia Records	—	—	—
El Paso	Release date: 1970; Label: Columbia Records	—	—	—
My Woman, My Woman, My Wife	Release date: 1970; Label: Columbia Records	2	117	—
From the Heart	Release date: 1971; Label: Columbia Records	—	—	—
Today	Release date: 1971; Label: Columbia Records	15	175	—
The World	Release date: 1971; Label: Columbia Records	32	—	—
Own Favorites	Release date: 1972; Label: Columbia Records	—	—	—
Bound for Old Mexico	Release date: 1972; Label: Columbia Records	32	—	—
I've Got Woman's Love	Release date: 1972; Label: Columbia Records	32	—	—
Have I Told You Lately That I Love You?	Release date: 1972; Label: Columbia Records	45	—	—
This Much a Man	Release date: 1972; Label: MCA Records	3	—	—
Marty Robbins	Release date: 1973; Label: MCA Records	22	—	—
Good'n Country	Release date: 1974; Label: MCA Records	7	—	—
Two Gun Daddy	Release date: 1975; Label: MCA Records	—	—	—
No Signs of Loneliness Here	Release date: 1975; Label: Columbia Records	31	—	—
El Paso City	Release date: 1976; Label: Columbia Records	1	—	—
Adios Amigo	Release date: 1977; Label: Columbia Records	5	—	—
Don't Let Me Touch You	Release date: 1977; Label: Columbia Records	24	—	—
The Performer	Release date: 1979; Label: Columbia Records	47	—	7
All Around Cowboy	Release date: 1979; Label: Columbia Records	45	—	—
"—" denotes releases that did not chart

=== 1980s albums ===
Title	Album details	Peak chart positions		
Title	Album details	US Country	CAN Country	CAN
With Love	Release date: 1980; Label: Columbia Records	—	5	—
Everything I've Always Wanted	Release date: 1981; Label: Columbia Records	—	—	—
Come Back to Me	Release date: 1982; Label: Columbia Records	25	—	—
Some Memories Just Won't Die	Release date: 1983; Label: Columbia Records	25	—	30
Lifetime of Song	Release date: 1983; Label: Columbia Records	36	—	—
Twentieth Century Drifter	Release date: 1983; Label: MCA Records	—	—	—
Long Long Ago	Release date: 1984; Label: CBS Records (CBS 39575)	—	—	—
"—" denotes releases that did not chart

== Compilation albums ==
Title	Album details	Peak chart positions		Certifications (sales threshold)
Title	Album details	US Country	US	Certifications (sales threshold)
Marty's Greatest Hits	Release date: 1959; Label: Columbia Records	—	—	US: Gold
More Greatest Hits	Release date: 1961; Label: Columbia Records	—	—	
Greatest Hits 3	Release date: 1971; Label: Columbia Records	5	143	US: Gold
All-Time Greatest Hits	Release date: 1972; Label: Columbia Records	25	—	US: Gold
Greatest Hits 4	Release date: 1978; Label: Columbia Records	44	—	
Encore	Release date: 1981; Label: Columbia Records	—	—	
The Legend	Release date: 1981; Label: Columbia Records	—	—	
Biggest Hits	Release date: 1982; Label: Columbia Records	17	170	US: Gold
A Lifetime of Song 1951-1982	Release date: 1983; Label: Columbia Records	—	—	
Super Hits	Release date: 1985; Label: TRC	—	—	US: Gold
The Essential Marty Robbins: 1951-1982	Release date: 1991; Label: Sony Columbia			
"—" denotes releases that did not chart

== Reissue ==
- A Lifetime of Song (1988)
- Gunfighter Ballads And Trail Songs (1989)(1999)
- American Originals (1990)
- Rockin' Rollin' Robbins, vol. 1 (1990)
- Rockin' Rollin' Robbins, vol. 2 (1990)
- Hawaii's Calling Me (1990)
- Musical Journey to Caribbean And Mexico (1990)
- Country(1951-1958) (1990)
- Rockin' Rollin' Robbins, vol. 3 (1991)
- All-Time Greatest Hits (1991)
- More Greatest Hits (1991)
- All-Time Greatest Hits (1992)
- Legendary Marty Robbins (1993)
- Lost And Found (1994)
- Song of Robbins (1995)
- Super Hits (1995)
- Under Western Skies (1995)
- Country(1960-1966) (1995)
- All American Country (1995)
- Singin' the Hits (1995)
- No. 1 Cowboy (1996)
- Story of My Life (1996)
- Best of Marty Robbins (1996)
- Rock'n Roll Robbins (1996)
- Marty After Midnight (1997)
- The Drifter (1997)
- 16 Biggest Hits (1998)
- What God Has Done (2001)
- Live Classics (2001)
- Just a Little Sentimental/Turn the Lights Down (2002)
- Reflections (2004)
- All Around Cowboy (2004)
- Early Years (2004)
- Love Songs (2004)
- Pretty Words (2005)
- Best of Marty Robbins (2006)
- Sing Me Something Sentimental (2006)
- Castle In the Sky (2006)
- Knee Deep in the Blues (2007)
- Rockin' Robbins (2007)
- Country Music Legends (2007)
- Grande Ole Opry (2007)
- Legend Lives On (2008)
- Mister Teardrop (2008)
- Essential Gunfighter Ballads And More (2008)
- Have I Told You Lately That I Love You?/I've Got a Woman's Love (2010)
- Singing Gunfighter (2010)
- I Walk Alone/It's a Sin (2010)
- El Paso: Greatest Hits And Favorites (2010)
- El Paso: Marty Robbins Story;1952-1960 (2012)
- My Woman, My Woman, My Wife/Marty After Midnight (2012)
- Rocks (2012)
- Return to Me : Columbia Country Hits; 1959-1982 (2013)
- Legends/Come Back to Me (2013)
- El Paso City/Adios Amigo (2013)
- 101 Devil Woman: Best of Marty Robbins (2013)
- Just a Little Sentimental/Devil Woman (2013)
- By the Time I get to Phoenix/Tonight Carmen (2013)
- Devil Woman: 30 Greatest Hits (2014)
- Six Classic Albums Plus Bonus Tracks (2014)
- 20 the Century Drifter: MCA Years (2014)
- Songs From a Gunfighter (2015)
- Today/Don't Let Me Touch You (2016)
- All Around Cowboy/Everything I Always Wanted (2016)
- RFD/My Kind of Country (2016)
- Marty Robbins (2016)
- Devil Woman: Four Lps And Six Singles; 1961-1962 (2017)
- Devil Woman/Portrait of Mary (2017)
- Complete Recordings: 1952-1960 (2017)
- Four Classic Albums (2018)
- The Drifter/Saddle Tramp/What God Has Done/Christmas With Marty Robbins (2018)

== Holiday albums ==
Title	Album details	Peak positions
Title	Album details	US
Christmas with Marty Robbins	Release date: 1967; Label: Columbia Records	Christmas Chart#21
Joy of Christmas featuring Marty Robbins And His Friends	Release date: 1972; Label: Columbia Records	—
A Christmas Remembered	Release date: 1986; Label: Columbia Records	—
"—" denotes releases that did not chart

== Singles ==
=== 1952–1960 ===
Year	Single	Peak chart positions					Certifications (sales threshold)	Album
Year	Single	US Country	US	UK	AU	CAN	Certifications (sales threshold)	Album
1952	"I'll Go On Alone"	1	—	—	—	—		—N/a
1953	"I Couldn't Keep from Crying"	5	—	—	—	—		—N/a
1954	"Pretty Words"	12	—	—	—	—		—N/a
1954	"Call Me Up (And I'll Come Calling on You)"	14	—	—	—	—		—N/a
1955	"Time Goes By"	14	—	—	—	—		—N/a
1955	"That's All Right"	7	—	—	—	—		Rock'n Rollin' Robbins
1955	"Maybellene"	9	—	—	24	—		Rock'n Rollin' Robbins
1956	"Singing the Blues"	1	17	—	—	—		Marty's Greatest Hits
1957	"Knee Deep in the Blues"	3	—	—	—	—		Marty's Greatest Hits
1957	"A White Sport Coat"	1	2	—	1	7		Marty's Greatest Hits
1957	"Please Don't Blame Me"	11	—	—	52	22		—N/a
1957	"The Story of My Life"	1	15	—	2	2		Marty's Greatest Hits
1958	"Just Married"	1	26	—	2	38		—N/a
1958	"She Was Only Seventeen (He Was One Year More)"	4	27	—	2	7		Marty's Greatest Hits
1958	"Ain't I the Lucky One"	23	—	—	72	31		Marty's Greatest Hits
1959	"The Hanging Tree"	15	38	—	—	33		Marty's Greatest Hits
1959	"Cap and Gown"	—	45	—	—	—		—N/a
1959	"El Paso"	1	1	19	18	1		Gunfighter Ballads and Trail Songs
1960	"Big Iron"	5	26	48	67	10	UK: Silver; NZ: Gold	Gunfighter Ballads and Trail Songs
1960	"Is There Any Chance"	—	31	—	86	20		More Greatest Hits
1960	"Five Brothers"	26	74	—	87	29		More Gunfighter Ballads and Trail Songs
1960	"Ballad of the Alamo"	—	34	—	29	12		More Greatest Hits
"—" denotes releases that did not chart

=== 1961–1970 ===
Year	Single	Peak chart positions								Album
Year	Single	US Country	US	US AC	CAN Country	CAN	CAN AC	UK	AU	Album
1961	"Don't Worry"	1	3	—	—	6	—	—	17	More Greatest Hits
1961	"I Told the Brook"	—	81	19	—	—	—	—	91	—N/a
1961	"Jimmy Martinez"	24	51	—	—	24	—	—	42	—N/a
1961	"It's Your World"	3	51	12	—	—	—	—	—	—N/a
1962	"Sometimes I'm Tempted"	12	109	—	—	—	—	—	—	—N/a
1962	"Love Can't Wait"	12	69	18	—	—	—	—	—	—N/a
1962	"Devil Woman"	1	16	—	—	4	—	5	4	Devil Woman
1962	"Ruby Ann"	1	18	4	—	14	—	24	21	—N/a
1963	"Cigarettes and Coffee Blues"	14	93	—	—	—	—	—	—	—N/a
1963	"Not So Long Ago"	13	115	—	—	—	—	—	—	—N/a
1963	"Begging to You"	1	74	—	—	—	—	—	—	—N/a
1964	"Girl from Spanish Town"	15	106	—	—	—	—	—	—	Island Woman
1964	"The Cowboy in the Continental Suit"	3	103	—	3	—	—	—	56	Saddle Tramp
1964	"One of These Days"	8	105	—	—	—	—	—	—	—N/a
1965	"Turn the Lights Down Low"	—	—	—	—	—	6	—	—	Turn the Lights Down Low
1965	"Ribbon of Darkness"	1	103	—	—	—	—	—	—	—N/a
1965	"Old Red"	50	—	—	—	—	—	—	—	Return of the Gunfighter
1965	"While You're Dancing"	21	—	—	—	—	—	—	—	—N/a
1966	"Count Me Out"	14	—	—	—	—	—	—	—	—N/a
1966	"The Shoe Goes on the Other Foot Tonight"	3	—	—	—	—	—	—	—	—N/a
1966	"Mr. Shorty"	16	—	—	—	—	—	—	—	The Drifter
1967	"No Tears Milady"	16	—	—	—	—	—	—	—	—N/a
1967	"Tonight Carmen"	1	114	—	—	—	—	—	—	Tonight Carmen
1967	"The Girl With Gardenias in Her Hair"	9	—	—	1	—	—	—	—	Tonight Carmen
1968	"Love Is in the Air"	10	—	—	11	—	—	—	—	By the Time I Get to Phoenix
1968	"I Walk Alone"	1	65	—	3	96	—	—	—	I Walk Alone
1969	"It's a Sin"	5	—	—	1	—	—	—	—	It's a Sin
1969	"I Can't Say Goodbye"	8	—	—	5	—	—	—	—	It's a Sin
1969	"Camelia"	10	—	—	2	—	—	—	—	—N/a
1970	"My Woman, My Woman, My Wife"	1	42	23	1	35	38	—	98	My Woman, My Woman, My Wife
1970	"Jolie Girl"	7	108	—	7	—	—	—	—	Greatest Hits 3
1970	"Padre"	5	113	—	3	—	—	—	—	Greatest Hits 3
"—" denotes releases that did not chart

=== 1971–1980 ===
Year	Single	Peak chart positions			Album
Year	Single	US Country	US	CAN Country	Album
1971	"The Chair"	7	121	6	Today
1971	"Early Morning Sunshine"	9	—	12	Today
1972	"The Best Part of Living"	6	—	6	I've Got a Woman's Love
1972	"I've Got a Woman's Love"	32	—	33	I've Got a Woman's Love
1972	"This Much a Man"	11	—	12	This Much a Man
1973	"Laura (What's He Got That I Ain't Got)"	60	—	44	—N/a
1973	"Walking Piece of Heaven"	6	—	5	Marty Robbins
1973	"A Man and a Train"	40	—	40	Marty Robbins
1973	"Love Me"	9	—	3	Marty Robbins
1974	"Twentieth Century Drifter"	10	—	9	Good'n Country
1974	"Don't You Think"	12	—	13	Good'n Country
1974	"Two Gun Daddy"	39	—	—	Two Gun Daddy
1975	"Life"	23	—	38	Two Gun Daddy
1975	"Shotgun Rider"	55	—	—	—N/a
1976	"El Paso City"	1	—	1	El Paso City
1976	"Among My Souvenirs"	1	—	3	El Paso City
1977	"Adios Amigo"	4	—	3	Adios Amigo
1977	"I Don't Know Why (I Just Do)"	10	108	7	Adios Amigo
1977	"Don't Let Me Touch You"	6	—	5	Don't Let Me Touch You
1978	"Return to Me"	6	—	8	Don't Let Me Touch You
1978	"Please Don't Play a Love Song"	17	—	17	The Performer
1979	"Touch Me with Magic"	15	—	18	The Performer
1979	"All Around Cowboy"	16	—	32	All Around Cowboy
1979	"Buenos Dias Argentina"	25	—	17	All Around Cowboy
1980	"She's Made of Faith"	37	—	35	With Love
1980	"One Man's Trash (Is Another Man's Treasure)"	72	—	—	With Love
1980	"An Occasional Rose"	28	—	—	Everything I've Always Wanted
"—" denotes releases that did not chart

=== 1981–1983 ===
Year	Single	Peak chart positions		Album
Year	Single	US Country	CAN Country	Album
1981	"Completely Out of Love"	47	38	Everything I've Always Wanted
1981	"Jumper Cable Man"	83	—	The Legend
1981	"Teardrops in My Heart"	45	—	The Legend
1982	"Some Memories Just Won't Die"	10	1	Come Back to Me
1982	"Tie Your Dream to Mine"	24	17	Come Back to Me
1982	"Honkytonk Man"	10	2	Some Memories Just Won't Die
1983	"Change of Heart"	48	—	Some Memories Just Won't Die
1983	"Love Me" (re-issue; with Jeanne Pruett)	58	—	—N/a
1983	"What If I Said I Love You"	57	—	Some Memories Just Won't Die
"—" denotes releases that did not chart

== B-sides ==
Year	B-side	Peak chart positions				Original A-side
Year	B-side	US Country	US	AU	CAN	Original A-side
1956	"I Can't Quit (I've Gone Too Far)"	7	—	—	—	"Singing the Blues"
1957	"The Same Two Lips"	14	—	—	—	"Knee Deep in the Blues"
1957	"Teen-Age Dream"	15	—	52	16	"Please Don't Blame Me"
1958	"Stairway of Love"	2	68	81	31	"Just Married"
1958	"Sittin' In a Tree House"	—	—	27	—	"She Was Only Seventeen (He Was One Year More)"
1966	"Private Wilson White"	21	—	—	—	"Count Me Out"
1967	"Fly Butterfly Fly"	34	—	—	—	"No Tears Milady"
1971	"Seventeen Years"	flip	—	—	—	"The Chair"
1973	"Crawling on My Knees"	flip	—	—	—	"Love Me"
1975	"It Takes Faith"	76	—	—	—	"Life"
"—" denotes releases that did not chart
