= All-Time Greatest Hits (Marty Robbins album) =

Compilation album by Marty Robbins
- Released: 1972
- Genre: Country; western
- Length: 59:19 (CD)
- Label: Columbia

Marty Robbins chronology
Today (1971)	All-Time Greatest Hits (1972)	This Much a Man (1972)

Professional ratings
Review scores
Source	Rating
AllMusic	5/5 stars

All-Time Greatest Hits is a compilation album of songs by Marty Robbins, released on Columbia Records in 1972. It contains 20 songs covering the years 1957 through 1970. It's the AllMusic "album pick" for compilations of Robbins.

== Track listing ==
1991 CD reissue
No.	Title	Writer(s)	Original album	Length
1.	"El Paso"	Marty Robbins	Gunfighter Ballads and Trail Songs, 1959	4:19
2.	"Streets of Laredo"	Traditional	More Gunfighter Ballads and Trail Songs, 1960	2:47
3.	"Ribbon of Darkness"	Gordon Lightfoot	non-album single 1965	2:30
4.	"Love Is Blue"	André Popp / Brian Blackburn / Pierre Cour	By the Time I Get to Phoenix, 1968	2:24
5.	"Big Iron"	Marty Robbins	Gunfighter Ballads and Trail Songs	3:56
6.	"Devil Woman"	Marty Robbins	Devil Woman, 1962	2:51
7.	"Don't Worry"	Marty Robbins	More Greatest Hits, 1961	3:15
8.	"Tonight Carmen"	Marty Robbins	Tonight Carmen, 1967	2:45
9.	"You Gave Me a Mountain"	Marty Robbins	It's a Sin, 1969	4:02
10.	"Kaw-Liga"	Hank Williams and Fred Rose	Marty Robbins, 1958	2:30
11.	"My Woman, My Woman, My Wife"	Marty Robbins	My Woman, My Woman, My Wife, 1971	3:31
12.	"Padre"	Jacques Larue and Alain Romans	non-album single 1970; collected on Greatest Hits 3, 1971	3:18
13.	"The Hanging Tree"	Max Steiner / Mack David / Jerry Livingston	non-album single 1959; bonus track on 1999 reissue of Gunfighter Ballads and Trail Songs	2:50
14.	"Red River Valley"	Traditional	More Greatest Hits, 1961	2:24
15.	"Jolie Girl"	Marty Robbins	non-album single 1970; collected on Greatest Hits 3, 1971	2:43
16.	"The Girl with Gardenias in Her Hair"	Marty Robbins	Tonight Carmen, 1967	2:35
17.	"It's a Sin"	Zeb Turner and Fred Rose	It's a Sin, 1969	2:33
18.	"Maria (If I Could)"	Marty Robbins	My Woman, My Woman, My Wife, 1971	2:33
19.	"I Walk Alone"	Herbert Wilson	I Walk Alone, 1968	3:01
20.	"Aloha ʻOe"	"Lydia" Lili'uokalani	Song of the Islands, 1957	2:30
