= Tonight Carmen =

Tonight Carmen may refer to:

- Tonight Carmen (song), a 1967 single by Marty Robbins
- Tonight Carmen (album), a 1967 album by Marty Robbins
