= I Walk Alone (Marty Robbins album) =

Studio album by Marty Robbins
- Released: October 1968
- Genre: Country
- Label: Columbia Records
- Producer: Bob Johnston

Marty Robbins chronology
By the Time I Get to Phoenix (1968)	I Walk Alone (1968)	It's a Sin (1969)

I Walk Alone is a studio album by country music singer Marty Robbins. It was released in 1968 by Columbia Records.

The album debuted on Billboard magazine's country album chart on November 16, 1968, peaked at No. 2, and remained on the chart for a total of 26 weeks. The album included two Top No. 1 singles: "I Walk Alone" and "Begging to You".

AllMusic gave the album a rating of two stars.

== Track listing ==
Side A

1. "I Walk Alone"
2. "Today I Started Loving You Again"
3. "I Can't Help It (If I'm Still in Love with You)
4. "They'll Never Take Her Love from Me"
5. "Begging to You"
6. "She Thinks I Still Care"

Side B

1. "The Last Letter"
2. "Lily of the Valley"
3. "I Feel Another Heartbreak Coming On"
4. "Windows Have Pains"
5. "Let Me Live in Your World"
