= Moe Bandy Salutes the American Cowboy =

Studio album by Moe Bandy
- Released: 1982
- Genre: Country
- Label: CSP / Warwick

Moe Bandy chronology
She's Not Really Cheatin' (She's Just Gettin' Even) (1982)	Moe Bandy Salutes the American Cowboy (1982)	I Still Love You in the Same Ol' Way (1982)

Moe Bandy Salutes the American Cowboy (titled Moe Bandy Sings 20 Great Songs of the American Cowboy in the UK) is the 18th album by country singer Moe Bandy, released in 1982.

== Track listing ==
1. "When It's Springtime In The Rockies" - (R. Sauer/Mary Hale Woolsey)
2. "Red River Valley" - (Trad. Arr. Ray Baker)
3. "Take Me Back To Tulsa" - (Bob Wills/Tommy Duncan)
4. "Bury Me Not on the Lone Prairie" - (Trad. Arr. Moe Bandy)
5. "Don't Fence Me In" - (Cole Porter)
6. "Tumbling Tumbleweeds" - (Bob Nolan)
7. "San Antonio Rose" - (Bob Wills)
8. "I'm An Old Cowhand" - (Johnny Mercer)
9. "Oklahoma Hills" - (Woody Guthrie/Jack Guthrie)
10. "Old Faithful" - (A. Holzman)
11. "Home on the Range" - (Trad. Arr. Ray Baker)
12. "Sioux City Sue" - (Ray Freeman/Dick Thomas)
13. "Deep in the Heart of Texas" - (Swander/Hershey)
14. "Cool Water" - (Bob Nolan)
15. "Good Old Paint" - (Trad. Arr. Moe Bandy)
16. "Back In The Saddle Again" - (Gene Autry/Ray Whitley)
17. "Streets of Laredo" - (Trad. Arr. Ray Baker)
18. "High Noon (Do Not Forsake Me)" - (Dimitri Tiomkin/Ned Washington)
19. "The Strawberry Roan" - (Curley Fletcher)
20. "The Old Chisholm Trail" - (Trad. Arr. Moe Bandy)
