= Western Swing & Waltzes and Other Punchy Songs =

Studio album by Colter Wall
- Released: August 28, 2020
- Genre: Country; Americana; neotraditional country; Western
- Length: 33:34
- Label: La Honda; Thirty Tigers
- Producer: Colter Wall

Colter Wall chronology
Songs of the Plains (2018)	Western Swing & Waltzes and Other Punchy Songs (2020)	Little Songs (2023)

Professional ratings
Review scores
Source	Rating
AllMusic	3/5 stars
Exclaim!	8/10
Pitchfork	7.6/10

Western Swing & Waltzes and Other Punchy Songs is the third album by Canadian country and western artist Colter Wall. It was released on August 28, 2020, through La Honda Records and Thirty Tigers.

== Track listing ==
Western Swing & Waltzes and Other Punchy Songs track listing
No.	Title	Writer(s)	Length
1.	"Western Swing & Waltzes"	Colter Wall	3:13
2.	"I Ride an Old Paint / Leavin' Cheyenne"	traditional	3:10
3.	"Big Iron"	Marty Robbins	4:24
4.	"Henry and Sam"	Wall	2:42
5.	"Diamond Joe"	traditional	3:12
6.	"High & Mighty"	Lewis Martin Pedersen III	2:41
7.	"Talkin' Prairie Boy"	Wall	3:50
8.	"Cowpoke"	Stan Jones	3:12
9.	"Rocky Mountain Rangers"	Wall	2:08
10.	"Houlihans at the Holiday Inn"	Wall	4:57
Total length:			33:34

== Charts ==
Chart performance for Western Swing & Waltzes and Other Punchy Songs
Chart (2020)	Peak position
Australian Country Albums (ARIA)	31
Canadian Albums (Billboard)	63
UK Country Albums (OCC)	1
US Billboard 200	103
US Independent Albums (Billboard)	17
US Top Country Albums (Billboard)	8
US Top Folk Albums (Billboard)	3

== Release history ==
Release formats for Western Swing & Waltzes and Other Punchy Songs
Country	Date	Format	Label	Ref.
Various	August 28, 2020	Compact disc; digital download; streaming; vinyl	La Honda Records; Thirty Tigers	
