= Five Brothers =

Five Brothers or The Five Brothers may refer to:

- "Five Brothers", The Unit episode
- "Five Brothers", jazz standard by Gerry Mulligan
- "Five Brothers", western song first recorded on More Gunfighter Ballads and Trail Songs by Marty Robbins
- Five Brothers, official blog of Mitt Romney presidential campaign, 2008
- Five Brothers, a brand of pasta sauces introduced by Unilever, now sold by Bertolli
- The Five Brothers, a boat built by Harry Clasper

== See also ==
- Brothers Five, 1970 wuxia film
- The Five Chinese Brothers, 1938 children's book
