= Colter Wall =

Canadian country musician (born 1995)

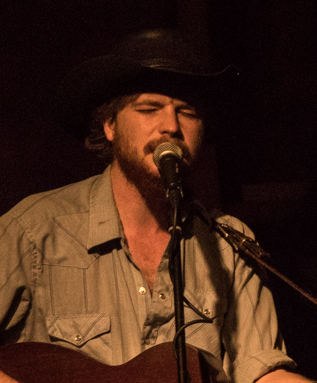
- Wall in October 2018

Background information
- Born: June 27, 1995 (age 31); Swift Current, Saskatchewan, Canada
- Origin: Canada
- Genres: Western; country; folk
- Occupations: Singer; songwriter; musician; rancher
- Instruments: Vocals; guitar
- Years active: 2014–present
- Labels: RCA; La Honda / Black Hole; Thirty Tigers; Young Mary's
- Member of: the Scary Prairie Boys
- Relatives: Brad Wall (father)
- Website: colterwall.com

Colter Wall (born June 27, 1995) is a Canadian singer, songwriter, and musician. Known for his deep, gruff baritone voice and narrative songwriting, Wall's music encompasses country, folk, and western styles. Wall is the son of former Canadian politician Brad Wall.

In June 2015 he released the EP Imaginary Appalachia. His self-titled debut album was released in May 2017, and his second album Songs of the Plains in October 2018. His third album, Western Swing & Waltzes and Other Punchy Songs, was released in August 2020. His fourth album Little Songs was released on July 14, 2023. Wall's fifth release, Memories and Empties, was released on November 14, 2025.

== Early life ==
Colter Wall was born in Swift Current, Saskatchewan, on June 27, 1995, the son of Tami and Brad Wall. His father served as the 14th premier of Saskatchewan. He has an older sister named Megan and a younger sister named Faith. He attended Swift Current Comprehensive High School and graduated in 2013. He then studied at the University of Saskatchewan in Saskatoon. He made demos of his songs while he was a student, and in 2015, he decided to take a break from his studies at the university to focus on his music career when his first EP was released.

== Career ==
Wall recorded a seven-song EP, Imaginary Appalachia, with Jason Plumb as producer in 2015 at Studio One in Regina, Saskatchewan. He collaborated on the EP with other artists from Regina such as Belle Plaine and The Dead South. He described his music as a blend of blues, folk and Americana. The EP was released on March 9, 2015, and "The Devil Wears a Suit and Tie" was released as his first single. His music gained more attention in late 2015 when professional wrestler Brock Lesnar mentioned him as a favorite artist during an interview with "Stone Cold" Steve Austin. The track "Sleeping on the Blacktop" from the EP was featured in the films Hell or High Water and Three Billboards Outside Ebbing, Missouri and the television shows Dog the Bounty Hunter and The Peripheral.

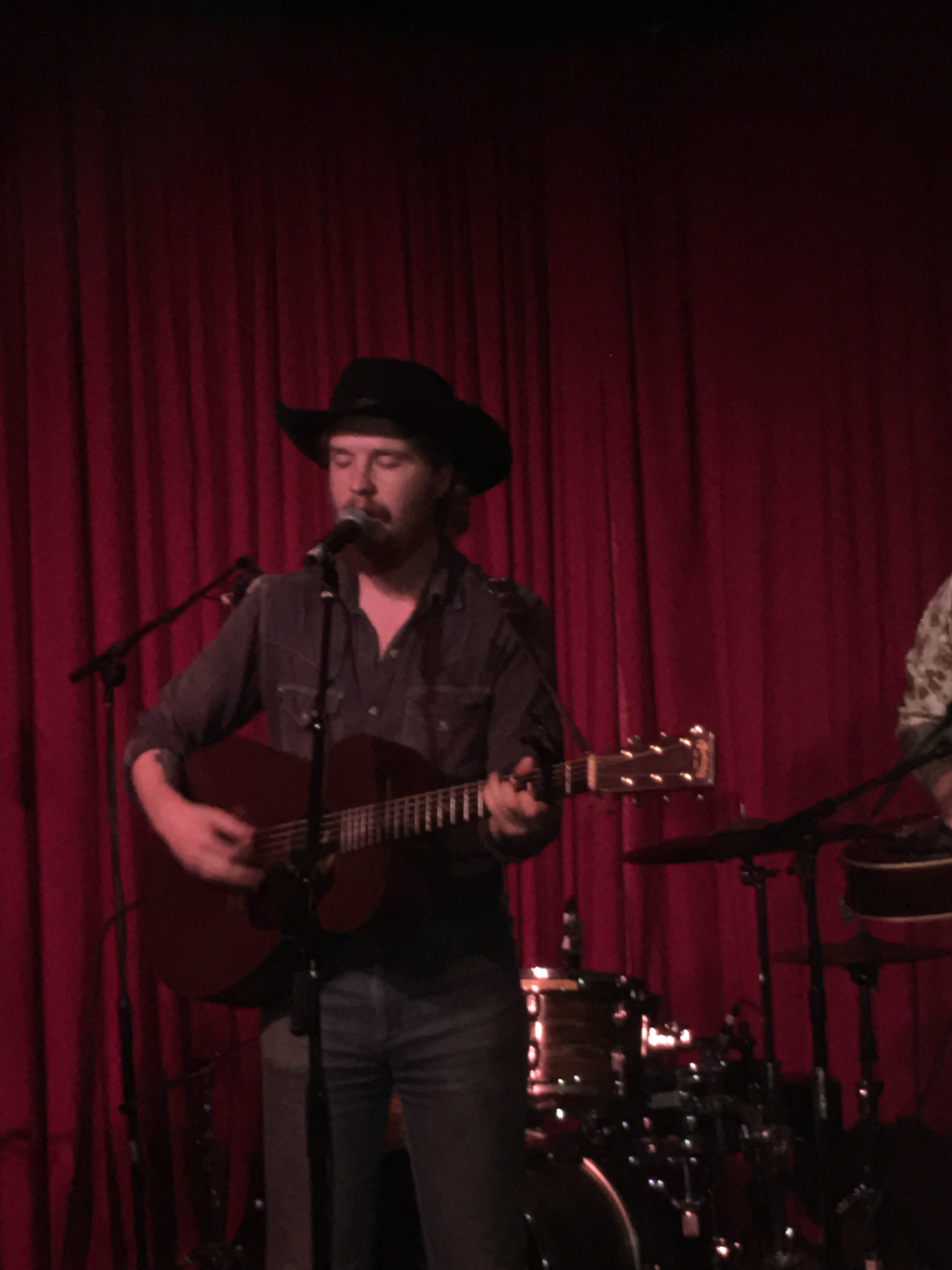
Wall in 2017

In 2016, Wall opened for Lucinda Williams at the Ryman Auditorium in Nashville. He was signed to Rick Rubin's American Songs publishing company. His first full-length album, self-titled Colter Wall, was produced by Dave Cobb at the RCA Studio A in Nashville. Wall was accompanied by Cobb on acoustic guitar, Chris Powell on drums, Mike Webb on piano, and Robby Turner on pedal steel. The album was released on May 12, 2017 and according to Wall, most of the songs on the album are autobiographical. His second album, Songs of the Plains, was announced in July 2018 and was released on October 12, 2018. In June 2020, Wall announced his third album, Western Swing & Waltzes and Other Punchy Songs which was released on August 28 with independent label, La Honda Records. Three of Wall's songs are featured in the fourth season of the Paramount series Yellowstone, including a rendition of Rex Allen's 1951 classic "Cowpoke", plus Wall's own "Plain to See Plainsman" and "Sleeping on the Blacktop". "Caroline" is also featured at the end of a season three episode. In 2023, Wall released two singles, entitled "Evangelina" and "Coralling the Blues" ahead of his third album Little Songs, which released on July 14, 2023. The song "Sleeping on the Blacktop" has been featured in two different Netflix series: it plays in the fourth episode of the 2024 series Kaos, and the 2025 episode "Gold Rush" of the series Untamed.

In March 2026, Colter Wall announced that he was taking an "indefinite hiatus" from performing live due to mental health concerns. He was quoted as saying: "The truth is that I'm mentally unwell. Despite this, I have pushed myself to continue with touring. As a result my mental health has only further declined."'

== Influences ==
Wall was familiar with country music growing up, as country artists such as Johnny Cash were played at home. He started learning guitar at the age of 13, playing music of rock bands such as AC/DC and Black Sabbath and Led Zeppelin. Later he became interested in old blues artists, and then started to listen to folk music. According to Wall, he first heard Bob Dylan's song "Don't Think Twice, It's All Right" around grade 10 or 11 (aged 15 or 16), and he was inspired to start writing and singing songs instead of only playing guitar. Other early musical influences he cited include Woody Guthrie and Ramblin' Jack Elliott, and he had also expressed interest in country singers such as Gram Parsons, Townes Van Zandt, George Jones, Waylon Jennings, Willie Nelson, and Hank Williams. He also covered Marty Robbins's hit Big Iron on his album Western Swing & Waltzes and Other Punchy Songs.

== Discography ==
=== Studio albums ===
List of studio albums, with selected details, chart positions and sales
Title	Album details	Peak chart positions								Sales	Certifications
Title	Album details	CAN	AUS Country	UK Country	US	US Country	US Folk	US Heat	US Indie	Sales	Certifications
Colter Wall	Release date: May 12, 2017; Label: Young Mary's; Formats: CD, digital download, vinyl	90	—	—	—	50	16	2	11	US: 2,600	MC: Gold
Songs of the Plains	Release date: October 12, 2018; Label: Young Mary's; Formats: CD, digital download, vinyl	36	—	—	180	17	7	2	9	US: 18,800	
Western Swing & Waltzes and Other Punchy Songs	Release date: August 28, 2020; Label: La Honda / Thirty Tigers; Formats: CD, digital download, vinyl, streaming	63	31	1	103	8	3	1	17		
Little Songs	Release date: July 14, 2023; Label: Black Hole / La Honda / RCA; Formats: CD, digital download, vinyl, streaming	82	25	9	75	17	4	—	—		
Memories and Empties	Release date: November 14, 2025; Label: Black Hole / La Honda / RCA; Formats: CD, digital download, vinyl, streaming	—	—	4	136	21	—	—	—		
"—" denotes releases that did not chart

=== Extended plays ===
List of extended plays, with selected details and chart positions
Title	EP details	Peak chart positions	Certifications
Title	EP details	US Heat	Certifications
Imaginary Appalachia	Release date: June 2, 2015; Label: Young Mary's; Formats: CD, digital download, vinyl	22	MC: Platinum; RIAA: Gold

=== Singles ===
Title	Year	Certifications	Album
"The Devil Wears a Suit and Tie"	2015	MC: 2× Platinum; RIAA: Platinum	Imaginary Appalachia
"Calgary Round-Up"	2018		Songs of the Plains
"Bob Fudge" / "Happy Reunion"	2019		non-album single
"Western Swing & Waltzes"	2020		Western Swing & Waltzes and Other Punchy Songs
"Cypress Hills and the Big Country" / "Let's All Help the Cowboys (Sing the Blues)"	2022		non-album single
"Evangelina"	2023		Little Songs
"Corraling the Blues"	2023		Little Songs
"For a Long While"	2023		Little Songs
"Little Songs"	2023		Little Songs
"1800 Miles"	2025		Memories and Empties

=== Other certified songs ===
Title	Year	Certifications	Album
"Sleeping on the Blacktop"	2015	RIAA: 2× Platinum; RMNZ: Platinum	Imaginary Appalachia
"Johnny Boy's Bones" (featuring the Dead South)	2015	MC: Gold	Imaginary Appalachia
"Caroline" (featuring Belle Planne)	2015	MC: Gold; RIAA: Gold	Imaginary Appalachia
"Thirteen Silver Dollars"	2017	MC: Gold	Colter Wall
"Motorcycle"	2017	MC: Gold; RIAA: Gold	Colter Wall
"Kate McCannon"	2017	RIAA: Gold	Colter Wall
"Fraulein" (featuring Tyler Childers)	2017	MC: Gold; RIAA: Gold	Colter Wall
"Saskatchewan in 1881"	2018	MC: Gold	Songs on the Plains
"Cowpoke"	2020	MC: Gold; RIAA: Gold	Western Swing & Waltzes and Other Punchy Songs
