= You Gave Me a Mountain (album) =

Studio album by Frankie Laine
- Released: 1969
- Label: ABC
- Producer: Jimmy Bowen

Frankie Laine chronology
Take Me Back to Laine Country (1968)	You Gave Me a Mountain (1969)	A Brand New Day (1971)

Singles from You Gave Me a Mountain
- 1. "You Gave Me a Mountain" Released: January 1969

Professional ratings
Review scores
Source	Rating
AllMusic	4.5/5 stars
Billboard	Positive

You Gave Me a Mountain is a studio album by Frankie Laine released in 1969 on ABC Records.

It was recorded with the Jimmy Bowen Orchestra and Chorus.

== Track listing ==
Side one
No.	Title	Writer(s)	Length
1.	"You Gave Me a Mountain"	Marty Robbins	3:58
2.	"Born to Be with You"	Don Robertson	2:52
3.	"The Secret of Happiness"	Larry Kusik, Eddie Snyder, Frankie Laine	2:06
4.	"Sing an Italian Song"	Baxter, Pober	2:25
5.	"A Place in the Shade"	Baker Knight	2:50

Side two
No.	Title	Writer(s)	Length
1.	"The Story of My Life"	David, Bacharach	3:10
2.	"Walk Out of My Mind"	Red Lane	3:00
3.	"Fresh Out of Tears"	Frankie Laine, Morgan	2:15
4.	"Allegra"	Matt Dennis, Dunham, Frankie Laine	2:50
5.	"Don't Make Promises"	Tim Hardin	2:49

== Charts ==
Chart (1969)	Peak position
US Top LPs (Billboard)	55
