= Gunfighter Ballads and Trail Songs =

Studio album by Marty Robbins
- Released: September 1959
- Recorded: April 7, 1959
- Studios: Bradley Studios, Nashville, Tennessee
- Genres: Country; western
- Length: 35:25 (1959 LP); 44:44 (1999 CD)
- Label: Columbia
- Producer: Don Law

Marty Robbins chronology
Marty's Greatest Hits (1959)	Gunfighter Ballads and Trail Songs (1959)	More Gunfighter Ballads and Trail Songs (1960)

Singles from Gunfighter Ballads and Trail Songs
- 1. "El Paso" Released: October 26, 1959; 2. "Big Iron" Released: February 22, 1960

Gunfighter Ballads and Trail Songs is the fifth studio album by Marty Robbins, released on the Columbia Records label in September 1959 and peaking at number six on the U.S. pop albums chart. It was recorded in a single eight-hour session on April 7, 1959, and was certified gold by the RIAA in 1965 and platinum in 1986.

It is an early concept album, with songs centered around themes of outlaws and cowboy life. The album contains what is perhaps Robbins's most successful single, "El Paso," a major hit on both the country and pop music charts. The album also includes the song "Big Iron", which gained a resurgence in popularity online as an Internet meme after its inclusion in the 2010 video game Fallout: New Vegas.

A follow-up album of cowboy songs, More Gunfighter Ballads and Trail Songs, was released in 1960. In 2017, Gunfighter Ballads and Trail Songs was selected for preservation in the National Recording Registry by the Library of Congress as being "culturally, historically, or aesthetically significant."

== Reception ==
Professional ratings
Review scores
Source	Rating
AllMusic	4.5/5 stars
Rolling Stone	Positive

AllMusic gave the album four-and-a-half stars, calling it "the single most influential album of Western songs in post-World War II American music." It is included in every revision of the list of 1001 Albums You Must Hear Before You Die.

Years after the album's release, members of the Western Writers of America chose six of its songs as being among the Top 100 Western Songs of all time. Three of them were written by Robbins: "El Paso," "Big Iron," and "The Master's Call." Three were written and previously recorded by others: "Cool Water," "Billy the Kid," and "The Strawberry Roan."

In 1999 the album was reissued for compact disc on the Legacy Records label with the tracks resequenced and with three bonus tracks: the full length version of "El Paso," the B-side "Saddle Tramp" and the film song "The Hanging Tree." It was part of Sony's American Milestones reissue series for classic country and western albums including, among others, At Folsom Prison by Johnny Cash and Red Headed Stranger by Willie Nelson.

In 2010, "Big Iron" was featured in Obsidian Entertainment's role-playing video game Fallout: New Vegas as a track on the in-game radio. The inclusion of the song in the game led to a resurgence in its popularity in the 2010s, with players rediscovering the album and creating Internet memes such as parodies and edits of the album cover and edits/mashups of "Big Iron".

== Track listing ==
=== Side one ===
No.	Title	Writer(s)	Length
1.	"Big Iron"	Marty Robbins	3:56
2.	"Cool Water"	Bob Nolan	3:09
3.	"Billy the Kid"	Traditional	2:19
4.	"A Hundred and Sixty Acres"	David Kapp	1:40
5.	"They're Hanging Me Tonight"	James Low, Art Wolpert	3:05
6.	"The Strawberry Roan"	Curley Fletcher	3:25

=== Side two ===
No.	Title	Writer(s)	Length
1.	"El Paso"	Marty Robbins	4:19
2.	"In the Valley"	Marty Robbins	1:48
3.	"The Master's Call"	Marty Robbins	3:05
4.	"Running Gun"	Tompall Glaser, Jim Glaser	2:10
5.	"The Little Green Valley"	Carson Robison	2:26
6.	"Utah Carol"	Traditional	3:13

=== 1999 reissue track listing ===
The reissue adds the tracks "The Hanging Tree" (a non-album single), "Saddle Tramp" (B-side of "Big Iron"), and the unedited monaural single version of "El Paso."

No.	Title	Writer(s)	Length
1.	"Big Iron"	Marty Robbins	3:56
2.	"A Hundred and Sixty Acres"	David Kapp	1:40
3.	"They're Hanging Me Tonight"	James Low, Art Wolpert	3:05
4.	"Cool Water"	Bob Nolan	3:09
5.	"Billy the Kid"	traditional	2:19
6.	"Utah Carol"	traditional	3:13
7.	"The Strawberry Roan"	Curley Fletcher	3:25
8.	"The Master's Call"	Marty Robbins	3:05
9.	"Running Gun"	Tompall Glaser, Jim Glaser	2:10
10.	"El Paso"	Marty Robbins	4:19
11.	"In the Valley"	Marty Robbins	1:48
12.	"The Little Green Valley"	Carson Robison	2:26
13.	"The Hanging Tree"	Jerry Livingston, Mack David	2:50
14.	"Saddle Tramp"	Marty Robbins	2:03
15.	"El Paso" (full length version)	Marty Robbins	4:38

== Personnel ==
- Marty Robbins – lead vocals, guitar
- Grady Martin, Jack Pruett, Hillous Butrum – guitar
- Floyd Chance, Bob Moore – bass
- Louis Dunn – drums, fiddle (uncredited on original release)
- Tompall & the Glaser Brothers – backing vocals

== Charts ==
Chart performance for Gunfighter Ballads and Trail Songs
Chart (1960)	Peak position
UK Albums (Official Charts)	20
US Top Stereo LPs (Billboard)	6

== Certifications ==
Certifications for Gunfighter Ballads and Trail Songs
Region	Certification	Certified units/sales
United States (RIAA)	Platinum	1,000,000^{^}
^{‡} Sales+streaming figures based on certification alone.
