= Ain't I Right =

1966 single by Marty Robbins

Single by Marty Robbins
- Released: June 1966
- Genre: Country
- Length: 3:18
- Songwriter: Marty Robbins
- Producer: Marty Robbins

Marty Robbins singles chronology
| "Count Me Out" (1966) | "Ain't I Right" (1966) | "The Show Goes On The Other Foot Tonight" (1966) |

"Ain't I Right" is a political country song written, produced, and performed by Marty Robbins in June 1966. Heavily anti-communist in nature, the song criticizes the counterculture of the 1960s and anti-war movements, opposition to the Vietnam War, and the American Left.

== Lyrical content ==
Written during the rise of American counterculture and opposition to the Vietnam War, "Ain't I Right" accuses counterculture activists and anti-war protestors of being communists and socialists (which the song states are essentially the same thing) intent on undermining and disrupting American life and values, especially the American war effort in Vietnam, and argues their intent is not to "help the people", but rather to maximize suffering and misery among them.

Robbins describes counterculture and anti-war activists as "a bearded bathless bunch" and "tramps", including "a minister or two" and "a priest, a nun, a rabbi, and an educated man" converted to leftism. Robbins alleges they are supported by "two-faced politicians" that promote draft-card burning and disagreeing with the U.S. government; he makes specific mention of a certain politician suggesting Americans "send some blood" and support North Vietnam, and suggests that the politician "keep the blood" and go to Vietnam himself to fight instead. Robbins argues these politicians make the United States weak, and proposes that they be removed from office in favor of "strong and able leaders" capable of leading the US to victory.

Robbins frames the first half of the song around a loose plot detailing leftist activists visiting a town in the Southern United States in an attempt to convert Southerners to leftist ideologies, only to cause trouble and misery before leaving with little care for the town's denizens.

== Reception ==
When the song was made, Columbia Records refused to release it, stating that it was too provocative and political. Other artists published covers of the song, such as Robbins's backup singer Bobby Sykes, who recorded it under the name of Johnny Freedom; and Autry Inman.
