= Songs of the Plains =

Studio album by Colter Wall
- Released: October 12, 2018
- Genre: Americana; Folk music; Country music
- Length: 34:08
- Label: Thirty Tigers
- Producer: Dave Cobb

Colter Wall chronology
Colter Wall (2017)	Songs of the Plains (2018)	Western Swing & Waltzes and Other Punchy Songs (2020)

Songs of the Plains is the second studio album by Canadian singer-songwriter Colter Wall. It was released on October 12, 2018 under Thirty Tigers.

== Commercial performance ==
Songs of the Plains has sold 18,800 copies in the United States as of March 2020.

== Critical reception ==
Professional ratings
Aggregate scores
Source	Rating
Metacritic	79/100
Review scores
Source	Rating
AllMusic	3.5/5 stars
American Songwriter	3.5/5 stars
Exclaim!	8/10
Pitchfork	7.6/10
Rolling Stone	3.5/5 stars

Songs of the Plains was met with "generally favorable" reviews from critics. At Metacritic, which assigns a weighted average rating out of 100 to reviews from mainstream publications, this release received an average score of 79, based on 8 reviews. Aggregator Album of the Year gave the release a 78 out of 100 based on a critical consensus of 7 reviews.

Stephen Thomas Erlewine of AllMusic said: "Throughout Songs of the Plains, Wall relies on stories and sketches designed to conjure ghosts of the Canadian prairies he calls home. As alluring as his spooky, skeletal arrangements are -- steel guitars are used as howling accents, not solos; he occasionally gooses his band to follow a train track rhythm".

=== Accolades ===
Accolades for Songs of the Plains
Publication	Accolade	Rank
American Songwriter	American Songwriter's Top 25 Albums of 2018	21
The A.V. Club	The A.V. Club's Best Country Albums of 2018	N/A
Digital Trends	Digital Trends' Top 50 Albums of 2018	26
Glide Magazine	Glide's Top 20 Albums of 2018	N/A
The Independent	The Independent's Top 40 Albums of 2018	6
Rolling Stone	Rolling Stone's Top 40 Country and Americana Albums of 2018	39
Vinyl Me, Please	Vinyl Me, Please's Top 40 Albums of 2018	14

== Track listing ==
Songs of the Plains track listing
No.	Title	Writer(s)	Length
1.	"Plain to See Plainsman"		3:49
2.	"Saskatchewan in 1881"		2:51
3.	"John Beyers (Camaro Song)"		2:01
4.	"Wild Dogs"	Billy Don Burns	4:52
5.	"Calgary Round-Up"	Wilf Carter	3:34
6.	"Night Herding Song"	Harry Stephens	2:20
7.	"Wild Bill Hickok"		2:39
8.	"The Trains Are Gone"		2:08
9.	"Thinkin' on a Woman"		3:20
10.	"Manitoba Man"		3:58
11.	"Tying Knots in the Devil's Tail"	Gail I. Gardner	2:36

== Personnel ==
Musicians

- Colter Wall – guitar, vocals
- Billy Don Burns – featured artist
- Wilf Carter – featured artist
- Dave Cobb – guitar, producer
- Corb Lund – vocals
- Blake Berglund - vocals
- Chris Powell – drums
- Mickey Raphael – harmonica
- Jason Simpson – bass

Production

- Gena Johnson – engineer

== Charts ==
Chart performance for Songs of the Plains
Chart (2018)	Peak position
Canadian Albums (Billboard)	36
UK Americana Albums (OCC)	12
US Independent Albums (Billboard)	9
US Top Country Albums (Billboard)	17
US Top Folk Albums (Billboard)	7
