= Return of the Gunfighter (album) =

Studio album by Marty Robbins
- Released: October 1963
- Genres: Country; western
- Length: 33:03
- Label: Columbia Records
- Producers: Don Law; Frank Jones

Marty Robbins chronology
Hawaii's Calling Me (1963)	Return of the Gunfighter (1963)	R.F.D. (1964)

Return of the Gunfighter is a studio album by country music singer Marty Robbins. It was released in 1963 by Columbia Records.

The album was released before Billboard magazine established its country album chart. When the chart was created at the beginning of 1964, the album was still on the chart, registered at No. 8, and remained on the chart for 12 weeks.

Two of the album's tracks, "San Angelo" and "The Master's Call", were re-recordings of songs originally appearing on Robbins' earlier Gunfighter Ballads albums. AllMusic gave the album a rating of four-and-a-half stars.

== Track listing ==
Side A

1. "San Angelo" – 5:32
2. "Man Walks Among Us" – 3:03
3. "Tall Handsome Stranger" – 2:05
4. "Dusty Winds" – 1:51
5. "The Master's Call" – 2:53
6. "The Fastest Gun Around" – 1:45

Side B

1. "Old Red" – 3:09
2. "The Bend in the River" – 2:32
3. "Johnny Fedavo" – 3:01
4. "Abilene Rose" – 2:59
5. "Doggone Cowboy" – 2:08
6. "The Red Hills of Utah" – 2:05

== Charts ==
Chart performance for Return of the Gunfighter
Chart (1964)	Peak position
US Top Country Albums (Billboard)	6
