= I Still Love You in the Same Ol' Way =

Studio album by Moe Bandy
- Released: 1982
- Genre: Country
- Label: Columbia
- Producer: Ray Baker

Moe Bandy chronology
Salutes The American Cowboy (1982)	I Still Love You in the Same Ol' Way (1982)	Greatest Hits (1982)

I Still Love You in the Same ol' Way is the 19th album by country singer Moe Bandy, released in 1982 on the Columbia label, although given as issued in 1983 on the UK album from which the following track listing was taken.

== Track listing ==
1. "I Still Love You The Same Ol' Way" (V. Warner) - 2:51
2. "I Took The Princess Home With Me" (J. Dickens/D. Whitaker) - 3:06
3. "City Boy" (R. Roden/C. Blake/A. Pessis) - 2:17
4. "One Lonely Heart Leads To Another" (S. Collom) - 2:19
5. "Early Nancy" (D. Lee/M. Sameth) - 2:25
6. "I Lost Her To A Dallas Cowboy" (L. Green/J. Green) - 2:24
7. "What Chicago Took From Me" (J. Dickens/D. Whitaker) - 2:43
8. "Leave The Honky Tonks Alone" (S. Milete/R. Wade) - 2:37
9. "Drivin' My Love Back To You" (J. Dickens/D. Whitaker) - 2:21
10. "Monday Night Cheatin'" (J. M. Roberson/A. R. Fleetwood) - 2:21

== Musicians ==
- Piano - David Briggs
- Fiddle - Johnny Gimble, Buddy Spicher
- Lead guitar - Gregg Galbraith
- Rhythm guitar - Leo Jackson, Ray Edenton
- Drums - Larrie Londin, Jerry Kroon
- Bass - Henry Strzelecki
- Steel guitar - Weldon Myrick, Hal Rugg
- Harmonica - Terry McMillan

== Backing ==
The Jordanaires with Laverna Moore

== Production ==
- Sound engineers - Ron Reynolds, Billy Sherrill
- Photography - Alan Messer
