= My Woman, My Woman, My Wife =

1970 country song written and released by Marty Robbins

Single by Marty Robbins

from the album My Woman, My Woman, My Wife
- B-side: "Martha Ellen Jenkins"
- Released: January 23, 1970
- Genre: Country
- Length: 3:31
- Label: Columbia
- Songwriter: Marty Robbins
- Producer: Bob Johnston

Marty Robbins singles chronology
| "Carmella" (1969) | "My Woman, My Woman, My Wife" (1970) | "Jolie Girl" (1970) |

"My Woman, My Woman, My Wife"

Single by Dean Martin

from the album My Woman, My Woman, My Wife
- B-side: "Here We Go Again"
- Released: 1970
- Recorded: 1970
- Genre: Country
- Length: 3:29
- Label: Reprise
- Producer: Jimmy Bowen

Dean Martin singles chronology
| "For the Love of a Woman" (1970) | "My Woman, My Woman, My Wife" (1970) | "Detroit City" (1970) |

"My Woman, My Woman, My Wife" is a song written and recorded by American country music artist Marty Robbins. It was released in January 1970 as the first single and title track from the album My Woman, My Woman, My Wife.

== Overview ==
The song was Robbins's 14th number one on the country chart. The single spent a single week at number one and spent a total of 15 weeks on the country charts. The song won the Grammy Award for Best Country Song in 1971. The single was also his last single to chart on Cash Box, reaching No. 38 and staying on the chart for 8 weeks.

== Charts ==
=== Weekly charts ===
| Chart (1970) | Peak position |
|---|---|
| Australia (Kent Music Report) | 98 |
| Canadian RPM Top Singles | 35 |
| Canadian RPM Country Tracks | 1 |
| Canadian RPM Adult Contemporary | 38 |
| US Billboard Hot 100 | 42 |
| US Hot Country Songs (Billboard) | 1 |
| US Cashbox Top Singles | 38 |

=== Year-end charts ===
| Chart (1970) | Position |
|---|---|
| US Hot Country Songs (Billboard) | 11 |

== Dean Martin version ==
In the middle of 1970 Dean Martin recorded the song. It "bubbled under" the Hot 100, reaching No. 10 and peaked at No. 97 on the Cashbox 100 Top Singles chart. It also charted in Australia, reaching No. 96.

| Chart (1970) | Peak position |
|---|---|
| US Bubbling Under the Hot 100 | 10 |
| US Cashbox Top Singles | 97 |
| Australia Top Singles (Kent Music Report) | 96 |
