= Give Thankx =

Studio album by Jimmy Cliff
- Released: 1978
- Recorded: Aquarius, Kingston, Jamaica
- Genre: Reggae
- Label: Warner Bros.
- Producer: Bob Johnston

Jimmy Cliff chronology
In Concert: The Best of Jimmy Cliff (1976)	Give Thankx (1978)	I Am the Living (1980)

Give Thankx is an album by the Jamaican musician Jimmy Cliff, released in 1978. Many of its songs were influenced by Cliff's travels in Africa. The album was produced by Bob Johnston.

== Critical reception ==
Professional ratings
Review scores
Source	Rating
AllMusic	2/5 stars
Christgau's Record Guide	B−
The Encyclopedia of Popular Music	2/5 stars
The Rolling Stone Album Guide	3/5 stars

The Calgary Herald opined that the album "seems to be directed at the disco crowd rather than the Natty Dread followers."

AllMusic commented that "Cliff's eclectic nature proves to be an asset throughout this fine LP." The Rolling Stone Album Guide called the album "pleasantly breezy."

== Track listing ==
All tracks written by Jimmy Cliff; except where indicated

1. "Bongo Man" – 5:03
2. "Stand Up and Fight Back" – 3:16 (Rebop Kwaku Baah)
3. "She Is a Woman" – 4:08
4. "You Left Me Standing by the Door" – 3:21
5. "Footprints" – 3:57
6. "Meeting in Afrika" 3:37
7. "Wanted Man" – 3:41 (Jimmy Cliff, Leonard Smith)
8. "Lonely Streets" – 4:21
9. "Love I Need" – 3:36
10. "Universal Love (Beyond the Boundaries)" – 4:10

== Personnel ==
- Jimmy Cliff – vocals
- Earl "Chinna" Smith, Ernest Ranglin – lead and rhythm guitar
- Leonard Smith – rhythm guitar, percussion
- Leebert "Gibby" Morrison – bass
- Paul "Pablo" Smith – keyboards
- Ansel Collins, Keith Sterling, Leslie Butler – additional keyboards
- Ronald "Ronnie" Murphy – drums
- Rebop Kwaku Baah – congas, percussion
- Uziah "Sticky" Thompson – percussion
- Babi Floyd, Cheryl Lynn, Debby, Diema, Janice Pendarvis, Ken Williams, Pam – backing vocals
- The Meditations – backing vocals on "Bongo Man"
- Ras Michael and the Sons of Negus – Nyabinghi drums on "Bongo Man"
- Dave Wolfert, Steve Lukather – electric guitar on "You Left Me Standing By the Door"
- Will Lee – bass on "You Left Me Standing By the Door"
- Neil Larsen – piano on "You Left Me Standing By the Door"
- Jay Winding – organ on "You Left Me Standing By the Door"
- Jim Keltner – drums on "You Left Me Standing By the Door"

Technical

- Engineer – Boris Gardner, Mervyn Williams
- Assistant engineers – Jay Krugman, Julie Last, Steve Fontano
- Mastered by – Jo Hansch
- Mixed by and recorded by – John Stronach
- Bob Himmel – artwork
- Photography – Ruiko Yoshida

"You Left Me Standing by the Door"

Recorded at Cherokee Recording Studios, Hollywood
