= Little Songs (Colter Wall album) =

Studio album by Colter Wall
- Released: July 14, 2023
- Recorded: 2020–2023
- Studio: Yellowdog Studios (Wimberley, Texas)
- Length: 32:33
- Label: La Honda; RCA
- Producer: Colter Wall; Patrick Lyons

Colter Wall chronology
| Western Swing & Waltzes and Other Punchy Songs (2020) | Little Songs (2023) | Memories and Empties (2025) |

Singles from Little Songs
- 1. "Evangelina" Released: April 27, 2023; 2. "Corralling the Blues" Released: June 1, 2023; 3. "For a Long While" Released: June 27, 2023

Little Songs is the fourth studio album by Canadian country and western artist Colter Wall. It was released on July 14, 2023, through La Honda Records and RCA.

== Background and singles ==
The album was recorded at Yellowdog Studios in Wimberley, Texas and produced by Patrick Lyons. Wall revealed that majority of the songs were created in the "last three years". He also stated that he "penned most of them from home" and believes that the songs reflect that.

On September 21, 2022, over two years after the release of his third studio album Western Swing & Waltzes and Other Punchy Songs (2020), Wall released two songs titled "Cypress Hills and the Big Country" featuring Lyons and a cover version of "Let's All Help the Cowboys (Sing the Blues)". However, both songs would not appear on the tracklist for the album. Wall continued to tease the record through snippets and previews over the following eight months.

Wall announced the album on April 27, 2023, and shared a cover of Hoyt Axton's "Evangelina". He had previously performed the song during several of his live sets. The album is set to feature eight original and two cover songs. On June 2, Wall shared a new original song titled "Coralling the Blues", described as a "sad, slow sway full of harmonica and dobro".

== Critical reception ==
Professional ratings
Review scores
| Source | Rating |
|---|---|
| Paste | 7.7/10 |
| Pitchfork | 7.1/10 |
| Slant Magazine | 4/5 stars |

Jeremy Winograd of Slant Magazine stated that only when somebody learns Wall works as a rancher can the album "be fully appreciated as not just a charming batch of old-fashioned country-western tunes, but as something more personal and carefully considered". Winograd also felt that it "eschews familiar folk-based influences like Bob Dylan and Townes Van Zandt in pursuit of capturing a more novel and idiosyncratic style". Ben Salmon of Paste found Wall's voice to be "as rugged and resonant as ever", also calling the cover of "The Coyote & the Cowboy" by Ian Tyson "a passing of the torch", with the album "prov[ing] he's ready to grab that torch and run". Pitchfork's Amanda Wicks wrote that listening to Little Songs "can feel like dropping a coin into the local nickelodeon and watching the past flicker to life, and much of that movement comes from Wall's band", who she said gave "radiant performances".

== Track listing ==
All tracks are written by Colter Wall, except where noted.

Little Songs track listing
| No. | Title | Writer(s) | Length |
|---|---|---|---|
| 1. | "Prairie Evening/Sagebrush Waltz" | | 3:35 |
| 2. | "Standing Here" | | 2:42 |
| 3. | "Corralling the Blues" | | 2:27 |
| 4. | "The Coyote & the Cowboy" | Ian Tyson | 3:20 |
| 5. | "Honky Tonk Nighthawk" | | 4:32 |
| 6. | "For a Long While" | | 3:19 |
| 7. | "Cow/Calf Blue Yodel" | | 2:53 |
| 8. | "Little Songs" | | 2:25 |
| 9. | "Evangelina" | Hoyt Axton; Kenneth Higginbotham | 3:47 |
| 10. | "The Last Loving Words" | | 3:33 |
| Total length: | | | 32:33 |

== Personnel ==
Credits adapted from the album's liner notes.

- Colter Wall – vocals, acoustic guitar, production
- Patrick Lyons – pedal steel guitar, mandolin, electric bass guitar, archtop guitar, Dobro, flatpick acoustic guitar, fretted Dobro, baritone guitar, electric guitar, electric mandolin, classical guitar, tic-tac bass, production
- Mike Stankiewicz – mixing
- Mike Monseur – mastering
- Jason Simpson – bass
- Jake Groves – harmonica
- Russell Patterson – drums
- Doug Moreland – fiddle
- Connie Collingsworth – album design
- Little Jack Films – photography

== Charts ==
Chart performance for Little Songs
| Chart (2023) | Peak position |
|---|---|
| Australian Country Albums (ARIA) | 25 |
| Canadian Albums (Billboard) | 82 |
| UK Album Downloads (OCC) | 84 |
| UK Country Albums (OCC) | 9 |
| US Billboard 200 | 75 |
| US Americana/Folk Albums (Billboard) | 4 |
| US Top Country Albums (Billboard) | 17 |
