= R.F.D. (Marty Robbins album) =

Studio album by Marty Robbins
- Released: August 1964
- Genre: Country
- Length: 29:30
- Label: Columbia Records
- Producer: Don Law, Frank Jones

Marty Robbins chronology
| Return of the Gunfighter (1963) (1966) | R.F.D. (1964) | What Has God Done (1966) |

R.F.D. is a studio album by country music singer Marty Robbins, which was released in 1964 by Columbia Records. The album debuted on Billboard magazine's country album chart on September 5, 1964, peaked at No. 4, and remained on the chart for 28 weeks.

== Track listing ==
Side A

1. "Melba from Melbourne" – 2:10
2. "Change That Dial" – 2:16
3. "Only a Picture Stops Time" – 2:47
4. "Southern Dixie Flyer" – 3:28
5. "Everybody's Darlin' Plus Mine" – 2:16
6. "She Means Nothing to Me Now" – 2:25

Side B

1. "Making Excuses" – 2:09
2. "Rainbow" – 2:11
3. "I Lived a Lifetime in a Day" – 2:33
4. "You Won't Have Her Long" – 2:31
5. "The Things That I Don't Know" – 2:14
6. "Urgently Needed" – 2:30
