= My Woman, My Woman, My Wife (Marty Robbins album) =

Studio album by Marty Robbins
- Released: 1970
- Genre: Country
- Label: Columbia Records
- Producer: Bob Johnston

My Woman, My Woman, My Wife is a studio album by country music singer Marty Robbins. It was released in 1970 by Columbia Records.

The album debuted on Billboard magazine's country album chart on May 30, 1970, peaked at No. 2, and remained on the chart for a total of 22 weeks. The album included the No. 1 hit single, "My Woman, My Woman, My Wife".

== Track listing ==
Side A

1. "My Woman, My Woman, My Wife"
2. "Can't Help Falling in Love"
3. "Love Me Tender"
4. "I've Got a Woman's Love"
5. "Three Little Words"
6. "Maria (If I Could)"

Side B

1. "The Master's Touch"
2. "My Happy Heart Sings"
3. "Without You to Love"
4. "A Very Special Way"
5. "Martha Ellen Jenkins"

== Charts ==
=== Weekly charts ===
Chart (1970)	Peak position
US Billboard 200	117
US Top Country Albums (Billboard)	2

=== Year-end charts ===
Chart (1970)	Position
US Top Country Albums (Billboard)	10
