= Memories and Empties =

2025 album by Colter Wall

- Standard edition cover

Studio album by Colter Wall
- Released: November 14, 2025
- Studio: RCA Studio A (Nashville, Tennessee)
- Genre: Country
- Length: 32:27
- Label: Black Hole; La Honda; RCA
- Producer: Colter Wall; Patrick Lyons

Colter Wall chronology
Little Songs (2023)	Memories and Empties (2025)

Alternative cover

Singles from Memories and Empties
- 1. "1800 Miles" Released: September 26, 2025; 2. "Back to Me" Released: October 17, 2025; 3. "The Longer You Hold On" Released: October 31, 2025

Memories and Empties is the fifth studio album by Canadian singer-songwriter Colter Wall, released via La Honda Records and RCA Records on November 14, 2025.

== Background ==
On August 27, 2025, Wall took to Instagram to make a post showcasing a Private Q multichannel headphone system from inside a recording booth at RCA Studio A. On September 6, Wall posted to Instagram stating "Management suggested getting a billboard to promote the upcoming single. A cheaper option was selected.", poking fun by showcasing a swinging wooden board with "Music Row 1800 Miles" written on it.

On September 25, 2025, Wall, officially unveiled the album, with the first single "1800 Miles" coming at midnight on the 26th, and revealed the album would be released on November 14 with 11 tracks.

== Track listing ==
All tracks are written by Colter Wall, except where noted.

Memories and Empties track listing
No.	Title	Writer(s)	Length
1.	"1800 Miles"		3:24
2.	"My Present Just Gets Past Me"		3:04
3.	"Like the Hills"		2:21
4.	"Memories and Empties"		3:22
5.	"It's Getting So (That a Man Can't Go into Town Just to Have Him a Drink)"		2:46
6.	"Living by the Hour"		2:29
7.	"4/4 Time"		4:59
8.	"The Longer You Hold On"		2:50
9.	"Back to Me"		3:01
10.	"Summer Wages"	Ian Tyson	4:32
11.	"Like the Hills (alt. take)"

== Personnel ==
Credits adapted from Tidal.

- Colter Wall – vocals, acoustic guitar, production
- Patrick Lyons – production (all tracks), electric guitar (tracks 1–3, 5, 9, 10), acoustic guitar (2, 4–8), Dobro (8), background vocals (10)
- Phillip Smith – mixing, engineering
- Mike Monseur – mastering
- Brady Henrie – pedal steel guitar
- Josh Shilling – piano (1–9), organ (7, 9)
- Russ Patterson – drums (1–8, 10), percussion (3)
- Matthew Menke – fiddle (1, 2, 4, 5, 10)
- Geoff Henderson – bass (1, 2, 5)
- Nikki Lake – background vocals (1, 2)
- Jake Groves – harmonica (3–5, 8, 9)
- Jason Simpson – bass (3, 4, 6–9)
- Noeline Hofmann – background vocals (10)

== Charts ==
Chart performance for Memories and Empties
Chart (2025)	Peak position
UK Album Downloads (OCC)	98
UK Americana Albums (OCC)	17
UK Country Albums (OCC)	4
US Billboard 200	136
US Top Country Albums (Billboard)	21
