= Song of the Islands (Marty Robbins album) =

Songs of the Islands

Studio album by Marty Robbins
- Released: 1957
- Genre: Country, Hawaiian
- Label: Columbia Records

Song of the Islands is a studio album by country music singer Marty Robbins. It was released in 1957 by Columbia Records. The album was inspired by his service during World War II. He was stationed in the Solomon Islands in the Pacific theater. To pass the time during the war, he learned to play the guitar, started writing songs, and came to love Hawaiian music.

In the annual poll of country music disc jockeys by Billboard magazine, Song of the Islands was rated No. 5 among the "Favorite C&W Albums" of 1958.

AllMusic gave the album a rating of four-and-a-half stars. Reviewer Timothy Monger called it "one of the terrific curiosities of [Robbins'] lengthy career."

== Track listing ==
Side A

1. "Song of the Islands" (Charles E. King)
2. "Don't Sing Aloha When I Go"
3. "Beyond the Reef"
4. "Crying Steel Guitar Waltz"
5. "My Isle of Golden Dreams" (Walter Blaufuss / Gus Kahn)
6. "Now Is the Hour"

Side B

1. "Sweet Leilani"
2. "Down Where the Trade Winds Blow" (Harry Owens)
3. "Constancy"
4. "Island Echoes"
5. "Moonland"
6. "Aloha ʻOe"
