= Tonight Carmen (song) =

Single by Marty Robbins

from the album Tonight Carmen
- B-side: "Waiting in Reno"
- Released: May 1, 1967
- Genre: Country
- Label: Columbia
- Songwriter(s): Marty Robbins
- Producer(s): Bob Johnston

Marty Robbins singles chronology
| "No Tears Milady" (1967) | "Tonight Carmen" (1967) | "Gardenias in Her Hair" (1967) |

"Tonight Carmen" is a song written and recorded by American country music artist Marty Robbins. It was released in May 1967 as the first single and title track from the album Tonight Carmen. The song was Robbins' twelfth number one on the country charts, spending one week at number one and total of twelve weeks on the charts.

== Chart performance ==
| Chart (1967) | Peak position |
|---|---|
| US Hot Country Songs (Billboard) | 1 |
| US Bubbling Under Hot 100 Singles (Billboard) | 14 |
