= The Hanging Tree (Marty Robbins song) =

1959 song performed by Marty Robbins

"The Hanging Tree" is a western ballad from the 1959 movie The Hanging Tree. It was scored by Max Steiner and written by Mack David and Jerry Livingston, who received nominations for the Laurel Awards and the Academy Awards in 1960. The text is a short reference to the film's story.

== Marty Robbins recording ==
"The Hanging Tree" was performed by Marty Robbins in the film's opening credits. It was featured on the 1999 CD reissue of Robbins' album, Gunfighter Ballads and Trail Songs. "The Hanging Tree" peaked at number 15 on the US, Hot C&W Sides chart. Crossing over to the US, Hot 100, it peaked at number 38.

== Accolades ==
- Members of the Western Writers of America chose it as one of the Top 100 Western songs of all time.

== Cover versions ==
- Frankie Laine did a cover, and he performed the song at the 32nd Academy Awards.
