= This Much a Man =

Studio album by Marty Robbins
- Released: 1972
- Genre: Country
- Label: Decca Records

Marty Robbins chronology
The World of Marty Robbins (1971)	This Much a Man (1972)	I've Got a Woman's Love (1972)

This Much a Man is a studio album by country music singer Marty Robbins. It was released in 1972 by Decca Records.

The album debuted on Billboard magazine's country album chart on December 16, 1972, peaked at No. 3, and remained on the chart for a total of 15 weeks.

AllMusic gave the album a rating of three stars.

== Track listing ==
Side A

1. "This Much a Man"
2. "Funny Face"
3. "Franklin, Tennessee"
4. "She's Too Good to Be True"
5. "You Don't Really Know" written by Jim Easterling
6. "Leaving Is a Whole Lot Harder"

Side B

1. "Overhurt and Underloved"
2. "It's Not Love (But It's Not Bad)"
3. "Eyes"
4. "Making the Most of a Heartache"
5. "Guess I'll Just Stand Here Looking Dumb"
