= I Walk Alone (Marty Robbins song) =

Single by Marty Robbins

from the album I Walk Alone
- B-side: "Lily of the Valley"
- Released: August 27, 1968
- Genre: Country
- Length: 3:17
- Label: Columbia
- Songwriter(s): Herbert W. Wilson
- Producer(s): Bob Johnston

Marty Robbins singles chronology
"Love Is in the Air" (1968)	"I Walk Alone" (1968)	"It's a Sin" (1969)

"I Walk Alone" is a song written by Herbert Wilson. and recorded by American country music artist, Eddy Arnold and was the B-side of his 78 rpm single "Did You See My Daddy Over There" (1945), and later for his compilation album Eddy Arnold Sings Them Again (1960).

== Marty Robbins recording ==
- Marty Robbins, recorded a version which was released in August 1968 as the first single and title track from the album I Walk Alone. It was Robbins' thirteenth number one on the U.S. country singles chart. The single spent two weeks at number one and a total of fifteen weeks on the chart.

== Chart performance ==
Chart (1968)	Peak position
US Hot Country Songs (Billboard)	1
US Billboard Hot 100	65
Canadian RPM Country Tracks	3
Canadian RPM Top Singles	96

== Other versions ==
- Ernest Tubb recorded the song during a May 24, 1945 session; but it was unreleased until 1996, when it was included in the CD box set Walking the Floor Over You.
- Don Gibson released his version about the same time as Marty Robbins, on the 1968 album More Country Soul.
- Following the success of the Marty Robbins single, at least four other country artists recorded "I Walk Alone" for albums released in 1969: Loretta Lynn's Your Squaw Is on the Warpath, Kitty Wells' Guilty Street, David Houston's Where Love Used to Live, and Willie Nelson's My Own Peculiar Way. Nelson had earlier recorded the song for Liberty Records, but that version wasn't released until 1975 on the compilation album Country Willie under the title "I'll Walk Alone."
