= Curley Fletcher =

American cowboy songwriter and poet (1892–1954)

Carmen William "Curley" Fletcher (1892—1954), also known as Curley W. Fletcher and Curley Fletcher, was an American composer of cowboy songs and cowboy poetry. A prolific creator of this material, he is best remembered for the classic cowboy song "The Strawberry Roan", written in 1915, and for his 1931 book Songs of the Sage.

== Career ==
Like many similar artists, Fletcher had numerous occupations, including cowboy/cowhand, mineral prospector, poet, champion rodeo rider as well as promoter, musician, publisher, movie actor, and advisor for Hollywood films. His songs and poems are regarded as strong material that comes across beautifully with or without music. They have been recorded by many musicians, particularly Marty Robbins and Michael Martin Murphey. He appeared as a rancher in the 1947 movie Gunsmoke.

== Personal life ==
Fletcher was born on September 22, 1892, in San Francisco to an Italian immigrant Benedetta Rossi and English Sailor William Henry "Harry" Fletcher Sr. The Fletchers moved to Bishop, California where Curley grew up with his three brothers and two sisters. Around 1914, Curley was wed to his childhood sweetheart, Minnie Edna Flesher. However, she died about ten years later, in 1926, leaving Curley heartbroken. In 1931 or 1932 Curley married Marie Alice Welch, daughter of Canadian mural artist Guy Martin Welch. They had one child, Dawn Eden Fletcher, born October 21, 1933. They later divorced. Curley married Joan Putters in 1945. The two stayed together until Curley's death, September 5, 1954.
