= You Gave Me a Mountain =

Single by Frankie Laine

from the album You Gave Me a Mountain
- B-side: "The Secret of Happiness"
- Released: 1969
- Recorded: 1968
- Genre: Country
- Length: 3:45
- Label: ABC 11174
- Songwriter: Marty Robbins
- Producer: Jimmy Bowen

Frankie Laine singles chronology
"Please Forgive Me" (1968)	"You Gave Me a Mountain" (1969)	"Dammit Isn't God's Last Name" (1969)

"You Gave Me a Mountain" (sometimes credited as "Lord, You Gave Me a Mountain") is a song written by country singer-songwriter Marty Robbins during the 1960s. It has been recorded by many artists, including Robbins himself for his 1969 album It's a Sin, but the highest-charting version of the song was by Frankie Laine in 1969. This version was included on Laine's album of the same name. The Rock and Roll legend, Elvis Presley, also recorded Robbins's tune. A live rendition is featured on the documentary Elvis On Tour, released in 1972.

== History ==
In Laine's autobiography That Lucky Old Son, he stated that, "Marty Robbins once told me that he'd been trying to bring 'You Gave Me a Mountain' to my attention for several years before he finally succeeded in November 1968. I wish he'd been quicker about it. There were many times in the mid-60s when I longed for a song of its quality."

The lyrics to the song detail a series of challenges that the singer has endured in his life, including the death of his mother while giving birth to him, Deprived of the love of his father was like time spent in prison "for something that I never done" and the singer's wife taking their child and leaving. He describes these setbacks as hills that he has scaled in the past, but then states that "this time, Lord, you gave me a mountain / A mountain you know I may never climb". The original third line of Robbins' song mentioned that he was "despised and disliked from my father", but Laine requested that this line be changed to "deprived of the love of my father" when he recorded his version, since Laine's father had died shortly before the recording took place.

== Reception ==
Released as a single in early 1969, Laine's version of the song was a hit single for the 55-year-old singer on U.S. singles charts. It peaked at #24 on the Billboard Hot 100 chart in March of that year, remaining in the Top 40 for seven weeks, and was the final Top 40 hit of Laine's long career. That same month, the song spent two weeks atop the Billboard Easy Listening chart.

== Charts ==
=== Frankie Laine version ===
Chart (1969)	Peak position
CAN RPM 100	13
CAN RPM AC	3
U.S. Billboard Hot 100	24
U.S. Billboard Easy Listening	1

== Other versions ==
Robbins recorded a version of his song, and although it wasn't released as a single, it is included on his 1969 album It's a Sin as well as some of his "greatest hits" compilation albums. Country music singer Johnny Bush also recorded a version of this song in 1969, and his version reached #7 on the Billboard Hot Country Singles chart that year. Also recording this song was Elvis Presley, who performed the song at his 1973 Honolulu concert Aloha from Hawaii being included on the subsequent live album Aloha from Hawaii: Via Satellite. Presley's version was included in many of his other releases throughout the 1970s.

Other artists who have recorded versions of "You Gave Me a Mountain" or performed it live include Brendan Bowyer, Don McLean, Eddy Arnold, Ray Price, Jerry Vale, Margie Singleton, Gene Watson, Jim Nabors, Dean Martin and Christer Sjögren.

== See also ==
- List of number-one adult contemporary singles of 1969 (U.S.)
