= It's a Sin (album) =

Studio album by Marty Robbins
- Released: 1969
- Genre: Country
- Label: Columbia Records

Marty Robbins chronology
| I Walk Alone (1968) | It's a Sin (1969) | Marty's Country (1969) |

It's a Sin is a studio album by country music singer Marty Robbins. It was released in 1969 by Columbia Records.

The album debuted on Billboard magazine's country album chart on July 12, 1969, peaked at No. 6, and remained on the chart for a total of 29 weeks. The album included two Top 10 singles: "It's a Sin" (No. 5) and "I Can't Say Goodbye" (No. 8).

AllMusic gave the album a rating of three stars.

== Track listing ==
Side A

1. "I Can't Say Goodbye"
2. "It's a Sin"
3. "Hello Daily News" written by Jim Easterling
4. "If I Want to Go"
5. "You Gave Me a Mountain"

Side B

1. "When My Turn Comes Around"
2. "We're Getting Mighty Close"
3. "Rainbows"
4. "Times Have Changed"
5. "This Song"
6. "Fresh Out of Tears"
