= Big Iron =

- 45 Single cover

Single by Marty Robbins

from the album Gunfighter Ballads and Trail Songs
- B-side: "Saddle Tramp"
- Released: February 22, 1960
- Recorded: April 7, 1959
- Studio: Bradley Studios, Nashville, Tennessee
- Genre: Country; Western; Tex-Mex
- Length: 3:57
- Label: Columbia
- Songwriter: Marty Robbins
- Producer: Don Law

Marty Robbins singles chronology
"El Paso" (1959)	"Big Iron" (1960)	"Is There Any Chance" (1960)

"Big Iron" is a Western ballad song written and performed by Marty Robbins. Originally released as an album track on Gunfighter Ballads and Trail Songs in September 1959, it was released as a single in February 1960 with the song "Saddle Tramp" as the B-side single. In 2010, members of the Western Writers of America chose it as the 11th-best Western song of all time.

The song tells the story of an Arizona Ranger's duel with a 24-year-old outlaw named Texas Red. Taking place in the "town of Agua Fria", (Note: The "town of Agua Fria" is suggested to be Agua Fria, New Mexico; see "Research - Big Iron The Book". Archived from the original on 2015-06-16.) the townspeople predict the death of the ranger, as Texas Red has already killed 20 men, but the ranger kills the outlaw with the titular "big iron" gun.

The song reached number five on the Billboard Country chart and number 26 on the Billboard Hot 100 chart in April 1960. The B-side, "Saddle Tramp" was not included on Gunfighter Ballads, but was later placed on Robbins' 1966 LP The Drifter.

"Big Iron" is featured in the 2010 video game Fallout: New Vegas on the in-game radio station. The success of the game helped spur a revival of interest in Robbins' music in the 21st century. In the decade following Fallout: New Vegas's release, "Big Iron" became an Internet meme, gaining popularity through remixes and parodies. The song received renewed praise when it was featured in "The Innovator," the second season premiere of the Fallout television series.

== Personnel ==
- Marty Robbins - lead vocals
- The Glaser Brothers - backing vocals
- Bob Moore - bass
- Grady Martin - lead guitar
- Jack H. Pruett - guitar
- Louis Dunn - drums
- Don Law - production
- M.C. Rather - sound mastering
- Hollis Flatt - sound mastering

== Charts ==
Weekly chart performance for "Big Iron"
Chart (1960–1961)	Peak position
Australia (ARIA)	67
UK Singles (Official Charts)	48
US Billboard Hot 100	26
US Hot Country Songs (Billboard)	5

== Certifications ==
Region	Certification	Certified units/sales
New Zealand (RMNZ)	Gold	15,000^{‡}
United Kingdom (BPI)	Silver	200,000^{‡}
^{‡} Sales+streaming figures based on certification alone.

== Cover versions ==
Michael Martin Murphey covered the song on his 1993 album Cowboy Songs III. With the Robbins family's blessing, the song was recorded as a duet with Robbins' original vocals. It was released as a single and peaked at number 62 on the RPM Country Tracks chart in Canada.

Other covers of the song include:

- Kingfish (1976) by Kingfish
- Gun Shot a Cry (1983) by Eek-A-Mouse
- Under the Influences (1999) by Mike Ness
- Big Iron (2001) by Carol Noonan
- Johnny Cash, in American IV: The Man Comes Around (2002). Also included in Unearthed (2003).
- Colter Wall in Western Swing & Waltzes and Other Punchy Songs (2020)
- Big Iron (2023) by The Longest Johns
- Big Iron (2024) by Garth Brooks
