= By the Time I Get to Phoenix (Marty Robbins album) =

Studio album by Marty Robbins
- Released: May 1968
- Genre: Country, traditional pop
- Label: CBS
- Producer: Bob Johnston

Marty Robbins chronology
Tonight Carmen (1967)	By the Time I Get to Phoenix (1968)	The Bend in the River (1968)

By the Time I Get to Phoenix is an album by Marty Robbins, produced by Bob Johnston and arranged by Robert Mersey. It was released in May 1968 by CBS Records. It reached #8 on the US Country Chart. The song 'Virginia' was released as a single in 1969.

== Track listing ==
1. "By the Time I Get to Phoenix" (Jimmy Webb)
2. "Am I That Easy to Forget" (Carl Belew/W.S Stevenson)
3. "Love Is Blue" (André Popp/Brian Blackburn/Pierre Cour)
4. "Virginia" (Marty Robbins)
5. "Until We Meet Again" (Robbins/Robert Mersey)
6. "Yesterday" (John Lennon/Paul McCartney)
7. "Love Is in the Air" (Robbins)
8. "As Time Goes By" (Herman Hupfeld)
9. "That Old Feeling" (Lew Brown/Sammy Fain)
10. "To Be in Love with Her" (Robbins)
11. "You Made Me Love You" (James V. Monaco/Joseph McCarthy)
