= The Strawberry Roan (song) =

American cowboy song by Curley Fletcher

Single by Paul Hamblin
- B-side: "Under Dakota's Cross"
- Written: 1915
- Published: 1915
- Released: July 3, 1930
- Recorded: March 21, 1930
- Genre: Western
- Length: 2:30
- Label: Victor
- Songwriter: Curley Fletcher

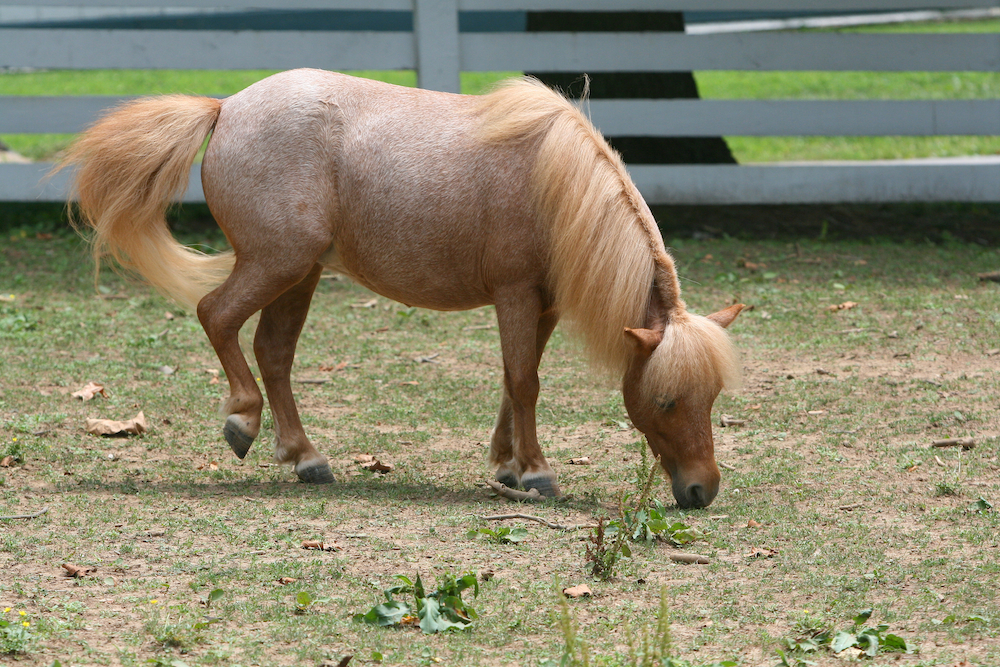
A miniature strawberry roan

"The Strawberry Roan" is a classic American cowboy song, written by California cowboy Curley Fletcher and first published in 1915, as a poem called The Outlaw Broncho. By the early 1930s, the song had become famous; in 1931 it was sung by a cowboy in the Broadway play Green Grow the Lilacs. It has become one of the best-known cowboy songs, found in dozens of collections of American folk music and performed on numerous recordings. Members of the Western Writers of America chose it as one of the Top 100 Western songs of all time.

The song tells the story of a bragging horse breaker who meets his match in a picturesque strawberry roan.

== In popular culture ==
American singer Chappell Roan, born Kayleigh Amstutz, chose her stage name in honor of her grandfather, Dennis K. Chappell, whose favorite song was "The Strawberry Roan".
