= Today (Marty Robbins album) =

Studio album by Marty Robbins
- Released: 1972
- Genre: Country
- Label: Columbia
- Producer: Marty Robbins

Marty Robbins chronology
From the Heart (1971)	Today (1972)	The World (1971)

Today (also titled Marty Robbins Today on the album disc label) is a studio album by American country music singer Marty Robbins (Martin David Robinson, September 26, 1925 – December 8, 1982) released in 1971 on the Columbia Records label (1972 in the UK). It reached No. 15 in the US country charts and No. 175 in the US album charts. The sleeve artwork was a reference to Robbins's passion for driving NASCAR racing cars.

== Track listing ==
Side one

1. "Early Morning Sunshine" (Jack Marshall) – 2:44
2. "The Late and Great Lover" (Bud D. Johnson) – 2:09
3. "I’m Not Blaming You" (Billy Mize) – 2:30
4. "Another Day Goes By" (Don Winters Jr., Dennis Winters) – 2:56
5. "Thanks, But No Thanks, Thanks to You" (Coleman Harwell II) – 2:36
6. "Quiet Shadows" (Cheryl Blanchard, Barbara Blanchard) – 2:36

Side two

1. "Too Many Places" (Don Winters) – 3:03
2. "You Say It’s Over" (Jimmy Sweeney) – 2:24
3. "Put a Little Rainbow in Your Pocket" (Bob Binkley, Phoebe Binkley) – 2:16
4. "Seventeen Years" (Marty Robbins) – 2:30
5. "The Chair" (Marty Robbins) – 4:11

== Production ==
- Produced by Marty Robbins
- Arranged by Bill McElhiney
- Album design by Ron Coro
- Album photography by Pal Parker
