= Tonight Carmen (album) =

Studio album by Marty Robbins
- Released: August 1967
- Genre: Country
- Length: 28:47
- Label: Columbia Records
- Producer: Bob Johnston

Marty Robbins chronology
My Kind of Country (1967)	Tonight Carmen (1967)	By the Time I Get to Phoenix (1968)

Tonight Carmen is a studio album by country music singer Marty Robbins. It was released in 1967 by Columbia Records.

The album debuted on Billboard magazine's country album chart on September 2, 1967, peaked at No. 4, and remained on the chart for a total of 25 weeks. The album included two hit singles: "Tonight Carmen" (No. 1) and "Gardenias in Her Hair" (No. 9).

AllMusic gave the album a rating of two stars.

== Track listing ==
Side A

1. "Tonight Carmen" – 2:45
2. "Waiting in Reno" – 2:26
3. "Is There Anything Left I Can Say" – 1:59
4. "Love Has Gone Away" – 2:13
5. "Bound for Old Mexico" – 3:00
6. "Don't Go Away Señor" – 2:37

Side B

1. "The Girl with Gardenias in Her Hair" – 2:35
2. "In the Valley of the Rio Grande" – 2:23
3. "The Mission in Guadalajara" – 2:35
4. "Chapel Bells Chime" – 2:51
5. "Spanish Lullaby" – 3:23
