= More Gunfighter Ballads and Trail Songs =

Studio album by Marty Robbins
- Released: July 1960
- Studio: Bradley Studios, Nashville, Tennessee
- Genre: Country; western
- Length: 32:45
- Label: Columbia Records
- Producer: Don Law

Marty Robbins chronology
Gunfighter Ballads and Trail Songs (1959)	More Gunfighter Ballads and Trail Songs (1960)	Just a Little Sentimental (1961)

More Gunfighter Ballads and Trail Songs is a studio album by country music singer Marty Robbins. It was released in 1960 by Columbia Records as a sequel to Robbins's 1959 hit album Gunfighter Ballads and Trail Songs.

In Billboard magazine's annual poll of country music disc jockeys, More Gunfighter Ballads was rated No. 9 among the "Favorite C&W Albums" of 1960. The Pensacola News-Journal in September 1960 called it "one of the better releases of recent months."

AllMusic gave the album a rating of four-and-a-half stars. Reviewer Bruce Eder noted that "it is similar to the earlier album, with the sound a little more stripped down in the vocal department and perhaps less romanticized than the earlier record.."

The opening track is "San Angelo". Columbia representative F. W. Stubblefield traveled to San Angelo, Texas, in July 1960, to present Mayor Paul Hudman with a copy of the album.

== Track listing ==
Side A

1. "San Angelo" (Marty Robbins) – 5:41
2. "Prairie Fire" (Joe Babcock) – 2:14
3. "Streets of Laredo" – 2:47
4. "Song of the Bandit" (Bob Nolan) – 2:30
5. "I've Got No Use for the Women" – 3:21

Side B

1. "Five Brothers" (Tompall Glaser) – 2:13
2. "Little Joe the Wrangler" – 4:07
3. "Ride, Cowboy Ride" (Lee Emerson) – 3:15
4. "This Peaceful Sod" (Jim Glaser) – 1:54
5. "She Was Young and She Was Pretty" (Marty Robbins) – 2:58
6. "My Love" (Marty Robbins) – 1:45

== Personnel ==
- Marty Robbins — lead vocals and guitar
- Grady Martin, Jack Pruett, Jim Glaser, Hank Garland — guitar
- Joseph Zinkan, Bob Moore — bass
- Floyd Cramer — piano
- Louis Dunn — drums
- Karl Garvin, Bill McElhiney — trumpet
