= Bob Johnston =

American record producer and musician (1932–2015)

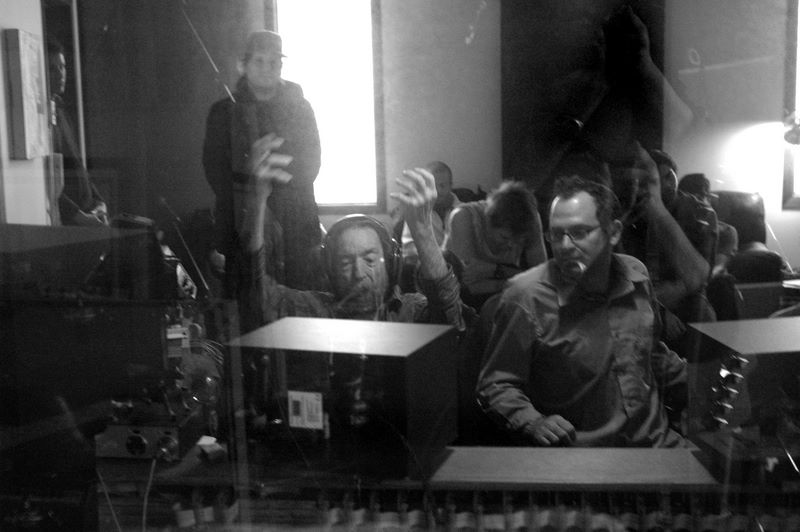
- At Hotel2Tango Studio in Montreal (left) with Howard Bilerman (right)

Background information
- Born: May 14, 1932; Hillsboro, Texas, US
- Died: August 14, 2015 (aged 83) Nashville, Tennessee, US
- Genres: Rock, folk, folk rock, blues, country, gospel
- Occupation: record producer
- Formerly of: Bob Dylan, Leonard Cohen, Johnny Cash, The Byrds, Simon & Garfunkel

Donald William "Bob" Johnston (May 14, 1932 – August 14, 2015) was an American record producer, best known for his work with Bob Dylan, Johnny Cash, Leonard Cohen, and Simon & Garfunkel.

== Early life and career ==
Johnston was born into a professional musical family. His grandmother, Mamie Jo Adams, was a songwriter, as was his mother Diane Johnston. Diane wrote songs for Gene Autry in the 1950s and scored a hit in 1976 when Asleep at the Wheel covered her 1950 demo "Miles and Miles of Texas". After serving in the U.S. Navy, Johnston returned to Fort Worth, Texas, where he and his mother collaborated on songwriting for rockabilly artist Mac Curtis and others. From 1956 to 1961, Johnston recorded a few rockabilly singles under the name Don Johnston.

He married songwriter Joy Byers with whom he began to collaborate. In later years, Johnston claimed that songs still credited to his wife Joy Byers were actually co-written, or solely written by himself. He has cited old "contractual reasons" for this situation. The songs in question include Timi Yuro's 1962 hit "What's A Matter Baby", plus at least 16 songs for Elvis Presley's films between 1964 and 1968, including "It Hurts Me", "Let Yourself Go", and "Stop, Look and Listen". Two songs credited to Byers, the aforementioned "Stop, Look and Listen" and "Yeah, She's Evil!" were recorded by Bill Haley & His Comets (the latter song was titled "The Meanest Girl in Town" when Presley recorded it). Presley recorded "The Meanest Girl in Town" on June 10, 1964, while Bill Haley recorded his version a week later, on June 16, 1964.

By 1964, he had moved into production work at Kapp Records in New York, freelance arranging for Dot Records, and signed as a songwriter to music publisher Hill and Range.

== Columbia Records: Dylan, Cash, and Cohen ==
Johnston began working for Columbia Records in New York, where he began producing Patti Page and the Pozo-Seco Singers. In 1965 he was successful in gaining the assignment to produce Bob Dylan, followed by Simon & Garfunkel, Johnny Cash, Flatt & Scruggs, and then Leonard Cohen. His style of production varied from a 'documentary' approach capturing a fleeting moment (exemplified by Dylan's albums and Cash's live albums) to providing subtle arrangements with strings, background vocals and seasoned session musicians (exemplified by Cohen's studio albums).

After a couple of years in New York, Johnston became head of Columbia in Nashville, Tennessee, where he had known many of the session musicians, such as Charlie Daniels, for years. He produced three of Cohen's albums, toured with him and also composed music to the Cohen lyric "Come Spend the Morning", recorded by both Lee Hazlewood and Engelbert Humperdinck.

Bob Johnston was very sophisticated. His hospitality was extremely refined. It wasn't just a matter of turning on the machines. He created an atmosphere in the studio that really invited you to do your best, stretch out, do another take, an atmosphere that was free from judgment, free from criticism, full of invitation, full of affirmation. Just the way he'd move while you were singing: He'd dance for you. So, it wasn't all just as laissez-faire as that. Just as art is the concealment of art, laissez-faire is the concealment of tremendous generosity that he was sponsoring in the studio.

— Leonard Cohen quoted in The Stranger Music of Leonard Cohen by William Ruhlmann, Goldmine

At the beginning of "To Be Alone with You" on Nashville Skyline, Bob Dylan asks Johnston "Is it rolling, Bob?"

== Independent producer ==
Dissatisfied with his salary earnings as a Columbia staff producer, particularly after several hit albums which earned him no royalties, Johnston became an independent producer, most successfully with Lindisfarne on Fog on the Tyne, which topped the British album chart in 1972.

In 1972, he toured with Leonard Cohen as a keyboard player and produced the resulting live album Live Songs.

In 1978, he produced Jimmy Cliff's Give Thankx album, featuring "Bongo Man". In 1979, Johnston produced an album with the San Francisco band Reggae Jackson, titled Smash Hits that featured Jimmy Foot, Cheryl Lynn, Kenneth Nash, and Wayne Bidgell (the low voice heard on Jimmy Cliff's "Bongo Man" track).

In 1985, Johnston produced an album Walking in the Shadow by the San Francisco band The Rhyth-O-Matics, for engineer Fred Catero's newly formed Catero label. Billboard magazine's "Pop Pick of The Week", the album's release was plagued with distribution difficulties.

During a period of financial difficulty, when he was under scrutiny from the IRS, Johnston moved to Austin, Texas, and did no record production for some time. He eventually returned with work on Willie Nelson's 1992 album The IRS Tapes: Who'll Buy My Memories? (Nelson had his own financial difficulties at the time).

In the mid 1990s, Johnston produced Carl Perkins' album Go Cat Go! which featured numerous guest stars including Paul Simon, George Harrison and Ringo Starr, as well as unreleased recordings of Perkins' "Blue Suede Shoes" by John Lennon and Jimi Hendrix. This album's release was delayed until 1996.

Towards the end of his life Johnston returned to working with fresh talent including singer-songwriters Natalie Pinkis (USA), Eron Falbo (Brazil), and indie rock band Friday's Child (USA). Falbo's album 73 was released in 2013. The final project Johnston worked on was Evolution: Live at the Saxon Pub which he co-produced for Austin band Hector Ward and The Big Time in 2015, which was released in 2016.

== Death ==
Johnston was in a memory facility and a hospice in Nashville for the last week of his life before dying on August 14, 2015. His wife Joy Johnston (née Byers) died in May 2017.

== Selective discography as producer ==
- Patti Page: "Hush, Hush, Sweet Charlotte" US #8 (1965), Patti Page Sings America's Favorite Hymns (1966)
- Bob Dylan: Highway 61 Revisited (with the exception of "Like a Rolling Stone") (1965), Blonde on Blonde (1966), John Wesley Harding (1967), Nashville Skyline (1969), Self Portrait (1970), New Morning (1970)
- Simon & Garfunkel: Sounds of Silence (1966), Parsley, Sage, Rosemary and Thyme (1966)
- Marty Robbins: Tonight Carmen (1967), Christmas with Marty Robbins (1967), By the Time I Get to Phoenix (1968), I Walk Alone (1968), It's A Sin (1969), Today (1971), No Signs of Loneliness Here (1975)
- Flatt and Scruggs: Changin' Times (1967), The Story of Bonnie and Clyde (1968), Nashville Airplane (1968), Final Fling (1969), Flatt Out (Lester Flatt solo LP, 1970), Nashville's Rock (Earl Scruggs solo LP, 1970)
- Johnny Cash: At Folsom Prison (1968); The Holy Land (1969); At San Quentin (1969); Hello, I'm Johnny Cash (1970); The Johnny Cash Show (1970); I Walk the Line (1970); Little Fauss and Big Halsy (1971)
- Burl Ives: The Times They Are A-Changin' (1968)
- Leonard Cohen: Songs from a Room (1969), Songs of Love and Hate (1971), Live Songs (1973)
- The Byrds: Dr. Byrds & Mr. Hyde (1969)
- Dan Hicks and his Hot Licks: Dan Hicks & His Hot Licks (aka Original Recordings)(1969)
- Lindisfarne: Fog on the Tyne (1972), Dingly Dell (1972)
- Esther Ofarim: Esther Ofarim (1972), He is also credited as the composer of "You're Always Looking for the Rainbow" on this album.
- Graham Bell: Graham Bell (1972)
- Michael Murphey: Geronimo's Cadillac (1973), Cosmic Cowboy Souvenir (1973), Michael Murphey (1973), Blue Sky - Night Thunder (1975), Swans Against the Sun (1976)
- Hoyt Axton: Less Than the Song (1973), Road Songs (1977)
- Pete Seeger: Rainbow Race (1973), Link in the Chain (1996)
- Loudon Wainwright III: Attempted Mustache (1973)
- Tracy Nelson: Tracy Nelson (1974), Sweet Soul Music (1975)
- New Riders of the Purple Sage: Oh, What a Mighty Time (1975), New Riders (1976), Who Are Those Guys? (1977)
- Alvin Lee: Rocket Fuel (1978)
- Jimmy Cliff: Give Thankx (1978)
- Joe Ely: Down on the Drag (1979)
- John Mayall: Bottom Line (1979)
- The Waterboys: Fisherman's Blues (1988) (on 2013 box set Johnston produced 15 tracks)
- Willie Nelson: The IRS Tapes: Who'll Buy My Memories? (1992)
- Carl Perkins: Go Cat Go! (1996)
- Eron Falbo: 73 (2013)
- Hector Ward and The Big Time: Evolution: Live at the Saxon Pub (2016)
