= Marty Robbins =

American country singer (1925–1982)

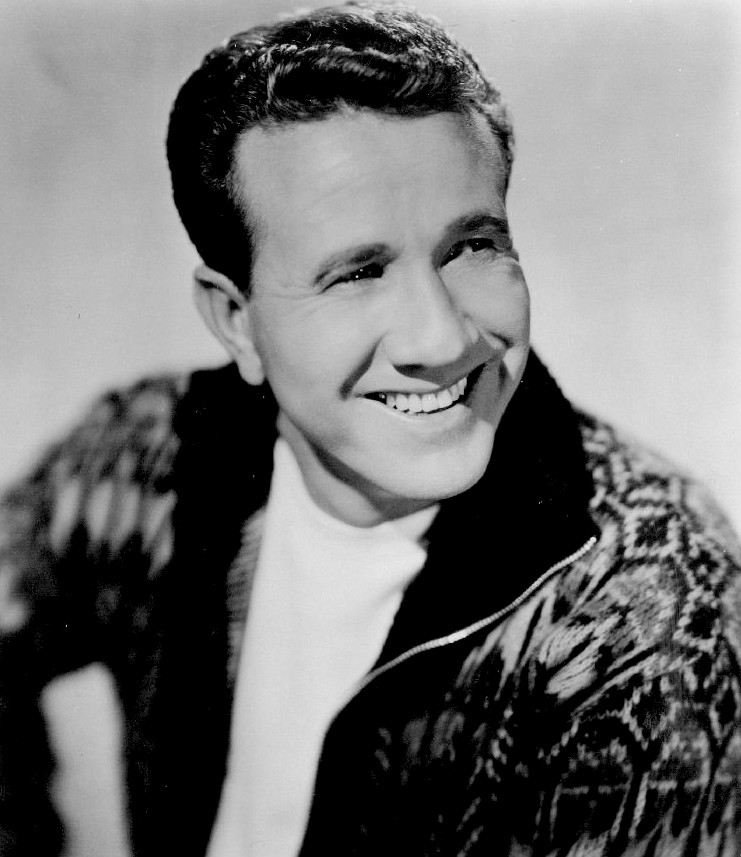
- Robbins in 1966
- Born: Martin David Robinson; September 26, 1925; Glendale, Arizona, U.S.
- Died: December 8, 1982 (aged 57); Nashville, Tennessee, U.S.
- Occupations: Singer; musician; songwriter; racecar driver
- Years active: 1948–1982
- Spouse: Marizona Baldwin (m. 1948)
- Children: 2
- Musical career
- Genres: Country; western; traditional pop; rockabilly
- Instruments: Vocals; guitar
- Works: Marty Robbins discography
- Labels: Columbia; Decca
- Website: martyrobbins.com
Marty Robbins
NASCAR Cup Series career
- 35 races run over 13 years
- Best finish: 48th (1974)
- First race: 1966 1966 Nashville 400 (Nashville)
- Last race: 1982 Atlanta Journal 500 (Atlanta)
Wins	Top tens	Poles
0	6	0
NASCAR Grand National East Series career
- 1 race run over 1 year
- First race: 1972 Gamecock 200 (Columbia)
Wins	Top tens	Poles
0	1	0
ARCA Menards Series career
- 1 race run over 1 year
- Best finish: 72nd (1981)
- First race: 1981 Talladega ARCA 200 (Talladega)
Wins	Top tens	Poles
0	0	0
- Statistics up to date as of September 6, 2026.

Martin David Robinson (September 26, 1925 – December 8, 1982), known professionally as Marty Robbins, was an American country and western singer and songwriter, as well as a professional stock car racing driver and team owner. He was one of the most popular and successful singers of his genre for most of his nearly four-decade career, which spanned from the late 1940s to the early 1980s. He was also an early outlaw country pioneer.

Born in Glendale, Arizona, Robbins taught himself guitar while serving in the U.S. Navy during World War II, and subsequently drew fame performing in clubs in and around his hometown. In 1952, he released his first number-one country song, "I'll Go On Alone". Four years later, he released his second number-one hit "Singing the Blues", and one year later, released two more number-one hits, "A White Sport Coat" and "The Story of My Life". In 1959, Robbins released his signature song, "El Paso", for which he won the Grammy Award for Best Country and Western Recording. The song began Robbins' association with Western balladry, a style that became a staple of his career. His later releases that drew critical acclaim include "Don't Worry", "Big Iron", "Devil Woman", and "Honkytonk Man", the last for which the 1982 Clint Eastwood film is named, and in which Robbins made his final appearance before his death.

Over the course of his career, Robbins recorded more than 500 songs and 60 albums, and won two Grammy Awards, was elected to the Country Music Hall of Fame and Nashville Songwriters Hall of Fame, and was named the 1960s Artist of the Decade by the Academy of Country Music. His songs "El Paso" and "Big Iron" were ranked by the Western Writers of America among the top-100 Western songs of all time. Robbins was a commercial success in both the country and pop genres, and his songs were covered by many other famous artists, including Johnny Cash, the Grateful Dead, and Elvis Presley. Johnny Cash noted, "there's no greater country singer than Marty Robbins." His music continues to have an influence in pop culture today, featuring prominently in several films, television shows, and video games.

== Early life ==
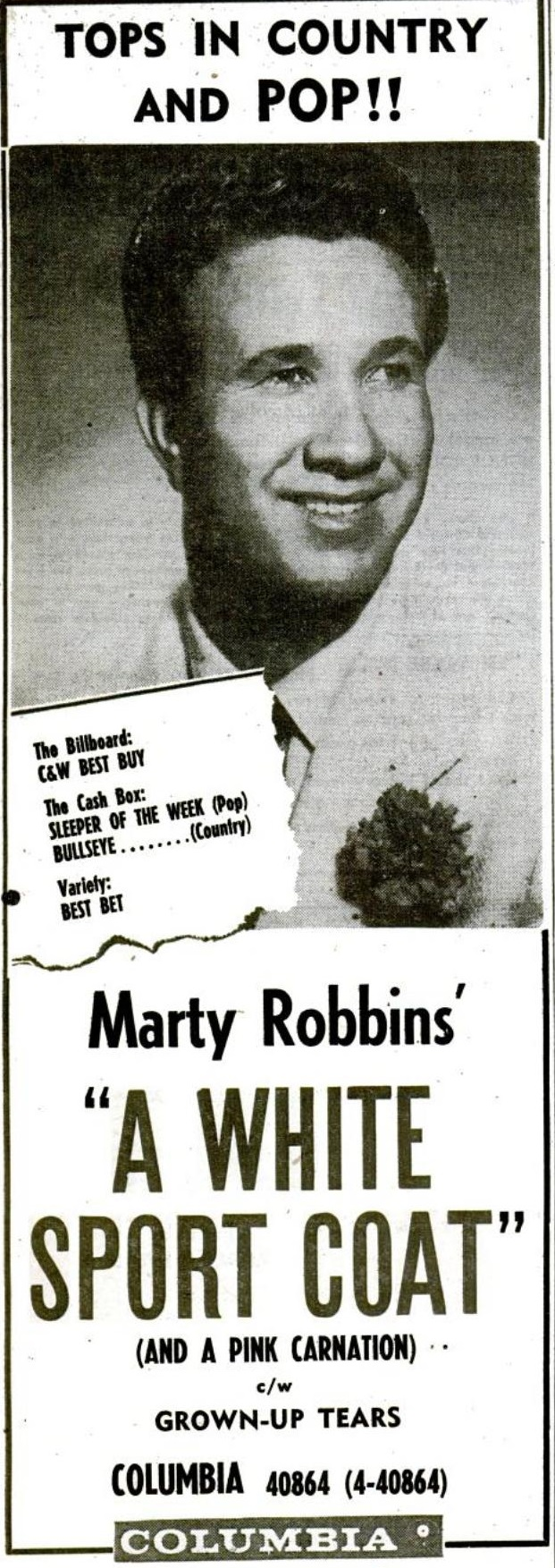
Billboard advertisement, April 20, 1957

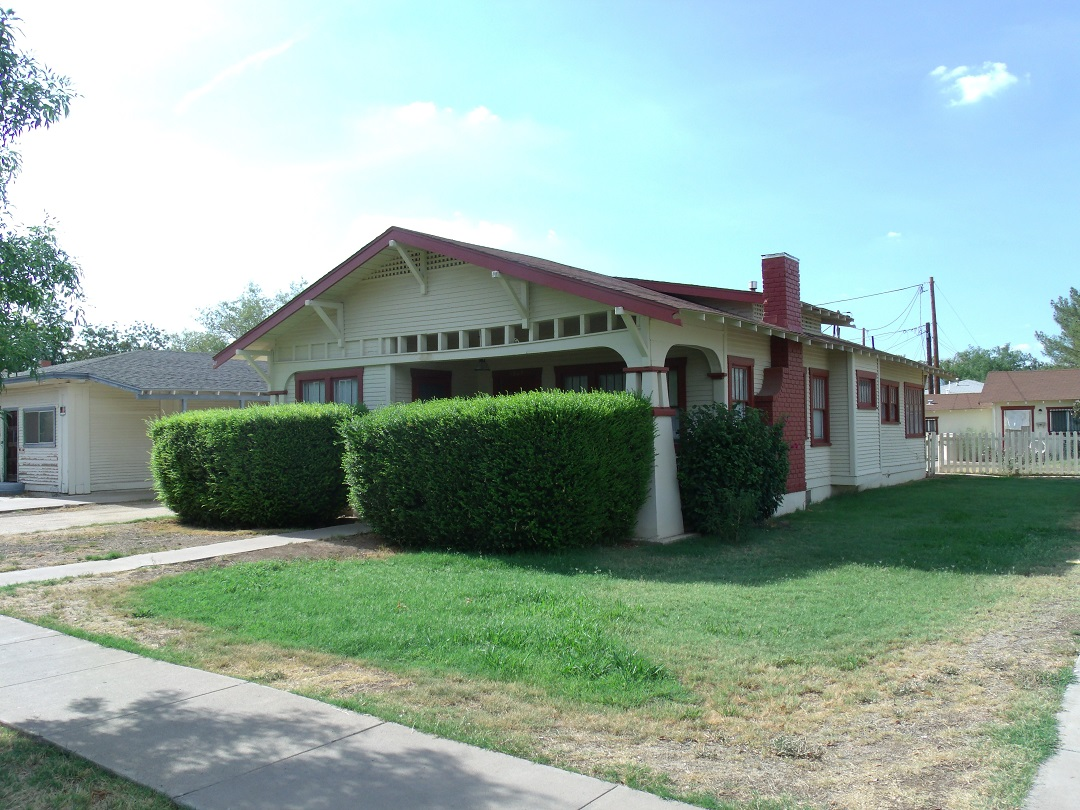
The F. M. Staggs / Marty Robbins House in Glendale, Arizona

Robbins was born Martin David Robinson on September 26, 1925, in Glendale, a suburb of Phoenix in Maricopa County. His parents, John "Jack" Robinson (1889–1975) and Emma Heckle (1889–1970), divorced in 1937 when Robbins was 12 years old.

Among the warmer memories of his childhood, Robbins recalled having listened to stories of the American West told by his maternal grandfather, "Texas Bob" Heckle, who was a traveling salesman, raconteur, and local medicine man. Robbins later recalled: "He had two little books of poetry he would sell. I used to sing him church songs and he would tell me stories. A lot of the songs I've written were brought about because of stories he told me. Like 'Big Iron' I wrote because he was a Texas Ranger. At least he told me he was."

Robbins dropped out of high school in Glendale before his time in the Navy, and worked as an amateur boxer, dug ditches, drove trucks, delivered ice, and served as a mechanic's helper.

At 17, Robbins left home to serve in the U.S. Navy as an LCT coxswain during World War II. He was stationed in the Solomon Islands in the Pacific theater. To pass the time during the war, he learned to play the guitar, started writing songs, and came to love Hawaiian music.

After his discharge from the military in 1947 and his marriage the following year, Robbins began to play at local venues in Phoenix, In the early 1950s, Marty moved on to host his own show on KTYL and then his own television show Western Caravan on KPHO-TV in Phoenix. After Little Jimmy Dickens made a guest appearance on Robbins' TV show, Dickens got Robbins a record deal with Columbia Records.

== Career ==
Robbins became known for his appearances on the Grand Ole Opry in Nashville. Music journalist Mary Harron wrote this about him in The Guardian:

Robbins was a symbol of the Nashville establishment that younger country fans abandoned in the '70s for the bleached-denim "outlaw school" of Waylon Jennings and Willie Nelson. Robbins belonged to the Jim Reeves era, and wore his embroidered cowboy suits proudly. Best known for the Western ballad, "El Paso", his career also touched the rock 'n' roll side of country in songs like "White Sport Coat and a Pink Carnation", and he kept a touch of the dude about him to the end.

In 1980, Robbins appeared on the PBS music program Austin City Limits (season five). In addition to his recordings and performances, Robbins was an avid race car driver, competing in 35 career NASCAR Grand National Series races with six top-10 finishes, including the 1973 Firecracker 400. In 1967, Robbins played himself in the car-racing film Hell on Wheels. Robbins was partial to Dodges prepared by NASCAR Hall-of-Famer Cotton Owens, and owned and raced Chargers and then a 1978 Dodge Magnum. He was also the driver of the 60th Indianapolis 500 Buick Century pace car in 1976. His last race was in a Junior Johnson-built 1982 Buick Regal in the Atlanta Journal 500 on November 7, 1982, a month before his death.

== Music and honors ==
Although by 1960, Robbins' output was largely Western (and some country) music, his initial hits, such as "Singing the Blues", "Knee Deep in the Blues", "The Story of My Life", "She Was Only Seventeen", and "A White Sport Coat and a Pink Carnation", were generally regarded as more pop/teen idol material than his hits from 1960 onwards ("El Paso", etc.). In 1957, he wrote and recorded "A White Sport Coat and a Pink Carnation" which sold over one million copies, and was awarded a gold record. His musical accomplishments include the Grammy Award for his 1959 hit and signature song "El Paso", taken from his album Gunfighter Ballads and Trail Songs. "El Paso" was his first song to hit number one on the pop chart in the 1960s. It was followed up, successfully, by "Don't Worry", which reached number three on the pop chart in 1961, becoming his third, and last, top-10 pop hit. "El Paso" was followed by one prequel and one sequel: "Faleena (From El Paso)" and "El Paso City". Also in 1961, Robbins wrote the words and music and recorded "I Told the Brook", a ballad later recorded by Billy Thorpe.

He won the Grammy Award for the Best Country and Western Recording 1961 for his follow-up album More Gunfighter Ballads and Trail Songs, and was awarded another Grammy, for Best Country Song, in 1970, for "My Woman, My Woman, My Wife". Robbins was named Artist of the Decade (1960–1969) by the Academy of Country Music, was elected to the Country Music Hall of Fame in 1982, was given three awards at the 17th Annual Music City News Country Awards in 1983, and was given a Grammy Hall of Fame Award in 1998 for "El Paso".

When Robbins was recording his 1961 hit "Don't Worry" at the Bradley Studios in Nashville, session guitarist Grady Martin accidentally created the electric guitar "fuzz" effect – his six-string bass was run through a faulty channel in the studio's mixing console. Robbins decided to keep it in the final version. The song reached number one on the country chart, and number three on the pop chart. Robbins was inducted into the Nashville Songwriters Hall of Fame in 1975. For his contribution to the recording industry, Robbins has a star on the Hollywood Walk of Fame at 6666 Hollywood Boulevard.

Robbins has been honored by many bands, including the Grateful Dead, who covered "El Paso" and Bob Weir and Kingfish, who covered "Big Iron". The Who's 2006 album Endless Wire includes the song "God Speaks of Marty Robbins". The song's composer, Pete Townshend, explained that the song is about God deciding to create the universe just so he can hear some music, "and most of all, one of his best creations, Marty Robbins." The Beasts of Bourbon released a song called "The Day Marty Robbins Died" on their 1984 debut album The Axeman's Jazz. Both Frankie Laine and Elvis Presley, among others, recorded versions of Robbins' song "You Gave Me a Mountain", with Laine's recording reaching the pop and adult contemporary charts in 1969. Though Elvis never recorded any of Robbins' songs in the studio, he was a big fan and recorded "You Gave Me a Mountain" live in concert several times; it appeared on 15 Presley albums. Johnny Cash recorded a version of "Big Iron" as part of his American Recordings series, which is included in the Cash Unearthed box set. Cash also recorded other songs by Robbins, including "I Couldn't Keep from Crying", "Kate", and "Song of the Patriot". He held Robbins in high esteem, having him guest-star several times on his network TV show. "Big Iron" was also covered by Mike Ness on his album Under the Influences, on which he paid homage to country music artists. The song, originally released on Robbins' 1959 album Gunfighter Ballads and Trail Songs, gained renewed popularity following its use in the 2010 video game Fallout: New Vegas.

His song "El Paso" was featured in the series finale of the AMC TV series Breaking Bad. "El Paso" was also featured in the Only Fools and Horses prequel made by the BBC.

Robbins was awarded an honorary degree by Northern Arizona University.

In 2001, singer-songwriter Don McLean released his album, Sings Marty Robbins, which features a collection of songs recorded by Robbins in his career.

In 2016, a portion of Glendale Avenue in Robbins' hometown of Glendale, Arizona, was renamed "Marty Robbins Boulevard".

Before Robbins died, he held a performance at the White House, alongside famous American singer Frank Sinatra.

He was named Man of the Decade by the Academy of Country Music in 1970.

== Political views ==
Robbins was a staunch conservative and anti-communist, and his political views remained firmly conservative during his lifetime. He supported Barry Goldwater in his 1964 United States presidential election campaign as a southern director for "Stars for Barry". As the opposition to the Vietnam War strengthened beginning in 1965, Robbins became an increasingly outspoken conservative voice. Two of his songs, "Ain't I Right" and "My Own Native Land", written in the same decade, later became popular songs during the conservative resurgence in the 1980s. The lyrics of "Ain't I Right" describe antiwar protesters as fifth columnists and communists. After Columbia Records refused to publish his more politically charged songs, Robbins' band member Bobby Sykes recorded the songs for Sims Records under the name Johnny Freedom.

== Racing career ==
Robbins loved NASCAR racing. With his musical successes, he was able to finance his avocation. Robbins always tried to run at the big racetracks (Talladega Superspeedway, Daytona International Speedway) every year and a smattering of the smaller races when time permitted. Robbins had six top-ten finishes in his career, with a personal-best top-five finish at the 1974 Motor State 360 in Michigan.

Robbins' cars were built and maintained by Cotton Owens. They were painted two-toned magenta and chartreuse, usually carrying car number 42 (though 6, 22, and 777 were also used). Over the years, he ran a few makes and models (Plymouths, Dodges, or Fords) before buying a 1972-bodied Dodge Charger from Owens. Robbins had a few major wrecks during the 1970s, and he had Owens rebuild the car to update the sheet metal to the 1973–1974 Charger specifications, and then finally 1978 Dodge Magnum sheet metal, which he raced until the end of 1980. Robbins' final NASCAR race car was a 1981 Buick Regal that he rented and drove in a few races in 1981 and 1982.

In 1972, at the Winston 500, Robbins stunned the competition by turning laps that were 15 mph faster than his qualifying time. After the race, NASCAR tried to bestow the Rookie of the Race award, but he would not accept it. He had knocked the NASCAR-mandated restrictors out of his carburetor and admitted he "just wanted to see what it was like to run up front for once."

Robbins is credited with possibly saving Richard Childress' life at the 1974 Charlotte 500 by deliberately crashing into a wall rather than T-bone (broadside) Childress's car that was stopped across the track.

In 1983, one year after Robbins' death, NASCAR honored him by naming the annual race at Fairgrounds Speedway the Marty Robbins 420.

Robbins' Dodge Magnum was restored by Owens and donated to the Talladega Museum by his family, and was displayed there from 1983 to 2008. The car is now in private hands in Southern California and raced on the Vintage NASCAR club circuit.

In 2014, Robbins' 1969 Dodge Charger Daytona was featured on an episode of Discovery Channels TV show Fast and Furious: Rolling Thunder. In that same year, an episode of Velocity's AmeriCarna featured ex-race team owner Ray Evernham spearheading the restoration of another of Robbins' NASCAR racers, a 1964 Plymouth Belvedere.

For the 2016 Darlington throwback weekend, Kyle Larson's number 42 NASCAR Xfinity Series car was painted purple and gold in honor of Robbins. For the 2021 Goodyear 400, Tyler Reddick's RCR number 8 NASCAR Cup car carries Robbins' signature magenta and chartreuse livery. For the 2022 running, Corey LaJoie's Spire Motorsports number 7 ran a throwback to Robbins' infamous 777 car that he ran in his career.

== Personal life and death ==
In 1948, Robbins married Marizona Baldwin, who claimed she had always wanted to marry a singing cowboy. They had a son, Ronnie, and a daughter, Janet.

Robbins developed cardiovascular disease early in life, and suffered his first heart attack at age 43 in 1969. After his third heart attack on December 2, 1982, he underwent quadruple coronary artery bypass surgery. He did not recover, and died on December 8 at St. Thomas Hospital in Nashville. He was 57 years old.

== Legacy ==
The city of Glendale, Arizona, honored Marty Robbins in various ways. In 2015, a bronze plaque was placed along the amphitheater walkway. In 2016, the 1-mile stretch of Glendale Avenue, between 59th and 51st Avenues, was renamed to Marty Robbins Boulevard. Following the release of Fallout: New Vegas, Robbins' song "Big Iron" substantially increased in popularity and inspired internet memes.

== Discography ==
Robbins' discography consists of 52 studio albums, 13 compilation albums, and 100 singles. In his career, Robbins charted 17 number-one singles on the Billboard Hot Country Songs charts, as well as 82 top-40 singles.

Robbins' highest-charting album is 1959's Gunfighter Ballads and Trail Songs. It charted to number six on the all-genre Billboard 200, and was also certified platinum by the Recording Industry Association of America. The album's first single, "El Paso", became a hit on both the country and pop charts, charting to number one on the Hot Country Songs, as well as the Billboard Hot 100. While that would be his only pop number one, in 1957, "A White Sport Coat" charted to number two, and in 1961, "Don't Worry" charted to number three.

His final top-10 single was "Honkytonk Man" from the 1982 eponymous film in which Robbins had a role. He died shortly before its release. Since his death, four posthumous studio albums have been released, but they made no impact on the charts.

== Filmography ==
- The Badge of Marshal Brennan (1957) as Felipe, a Mexican outlaw
- Raiders of Old California (1957) as Timothy Voyle
- Buffalo Gun (1958, released in 1961) as Marty Robbins, a lawman
- The Ballad of a Gunfighter (1963) as Marty Robbins, an outlaw
- Country Music Caravan (1964) as Himself, singing
- Tennessee Jamboree (1964) as Himself, singing
- The Road to Nashville (1966) as Himself, singing
- Hell on Wheels (1967) as Marty, a race car driver
- From Nashville With Music (1969) as Himself, singing
- Country Music (1972) as Himself, touring as singer, and as a race car driver
- Guns of a Stranger (1973) as Mathew Roberts
- Honkytonk Man (1982) as Smoky, a recording session singer

== Motorsports career results ==
=== NASCAR ===
(key) (Bold – Pole position awarded by qualifying time. Italics – Pole position earned by points standings or practice time. * – Most laps led.)

==== Grand National Series ====
NASCAR Grand National Series results
Year	Team	Number	Make	1	2	3	4	5	6	7	8	9	10	11	12	13	14	15	16	17	18	19	20	21	22	23	24	25	26	27	28	29	30	31	32	33	34	35	36	37	38	39	40	41	42	43	44	45	46	47	48	49	NGNC	Pts	Ref
1966	David Warren	53	Ford	AUG	RSD	DAY	DAY	DAY	CAR	BRI	ATL	HCY	CLB	GPS	BGS	NWS	MAR	DAR	LGY	MGR	MON	RCH	CLT	DTS	ASH	PIF	SMR	AWS	BLV	GPS	DAY	ODS	BRR	OXF	FON	ISP	BRI	SMR	NSV; 25	ATL	CLB	AWS	BLV	BGS	DAR	HCY	RCH	HBO	MAR	NWS	CLT	CAR	122nd	20	
1968	Dick Behling	32	Dodge	MGR	MGY	RSD	DAY	BRI	RCH	ATL	HCY	GPS	CLB	NWS	MAR	AUG	AWS	DAR	BLV	LGY	CLT	ASH	MGR	SMR	BIR	CAR	GPS	DAY	ISP	OXF	FDA	TRN	BRI	SMR	NSV	ATL	CLB	BGS	AWS	SBO	LGY	DAR	HCY	RCH	BLV	HBO	MAR	NWS	AUG	CLT; 12	CAR	JFC	78th	0	
1970	Robbins Enterprises	42	Dodge	RSD	DAY	DAY	DAY	RCH	CAR	SVH	ATL	BRI	TAL	NWS	CLB	DAR	BLV	LGY	CLT	SMR	MAR	MCH	RSD	HCY	KPT	GPS	DAY	AST	TPN	TRN	BRI	SMR	NSV	ATL	CLB	ONA	MCH	TAL	BGS	SBO	DAR	HCY	RCH	DOV	NCF	NWS	CLT; 32	MAR	MGR	CAR	LGY		94th	57	
1971	Robbins Enterprises	42	Dodge	RSD	DAY	DAY	DAY	ONT	RCH	CAR	HCY	BRI	ATL	CLB	GPS	SMR	NWS	MAR	DAR	SBO	TAL	ASH	KPT	CLT; 15	DOV	MCH	RSD	HOU	GPS	DAY	BRI	AST	ISP	TRN	NSV	ATL; 13	BGS	ONA	MCH	TAL	CLB	HCY	DAR; 7	MAR	CLT; 37	DOV	CAR	MGR	RCH	NWS	TWS; 25		69th	120	

==== Winston Cup Series ====
NASCAR Winston Cup Series results
Year	Team	No.	Make	1	2	3	4	5	6	7	8	9	10	11	12	13	14	15	16	17	18	19	20	21	22	23	24	25	26	27	28	29	30	31	NWCC	Pts	Ref
1972	Robbins Racing	42	Dodge	RSD	DAY	RCH	ONT; 8	CAR	ATL	BRI	DAR	NWS	MAR	TAL; 50	CLT	DOV	MCH	RSD	TWS; 40	DAY	BRI	TRN	ATL	TAL	MCH	NSV	DAR; 9	RCH	DOV	MAR	NWS	CLT	CAR; 26	TWS	54th	860.8	
1973	Robbins Racing	42	Dodge	RSD	DAY; 34	RCH	CAR	BRI	ATL	NWS	DAR	MAR	TAL	NSV	CLT	DOV	TWS; 29	RSD	MCH	DAY; 8	BRI	ATL	TAL; 36	NSV	DAR	RCH	DOV	NWS	MAR	CLT	CAR				83rd	828.80	
1974	Robbins Racing	42	Dodge	RSD	DAY	RCH	CAR	BRI	ATL	DAR	NWS	MAR	TAL; 15	NSV	DOV	CLT	RSD	MCH; 5	DAY	BRI	NSV	ATL	POC	TAL; 9	MCH	DAR	RCH	DOV	NWS	MAR	CLT; 42	CAR	ONT		48th	23.78	
1975	Robbins Racing	42	Dodge	RSD	DAY; 39	RCH	CAR	BRI	ATL	NWS	DAR	MAR	TAL; 31	NSV	DOV	CLT	RSD	MCH	DAY	NSV	POC	TAL	MCH	DAR	DOV	NWS	MAR	CLT	RCH	CAR	BRI	ATL	ONT		81st	121	
1976	Robbins Racing	42	Dodge	RSD	DAY	CAR	RCH	BRI	ATL	NWS	DAR	MAR	TAL	NSV	DOV	CLT	RSD	MCH	DAY	NSV	POC	TAL	MCH	BRI	DAR	RCH	DOV	MAR	NWS	CLT	CAR	ATL	ONT; DNQ		NA	–	
1977	Robbins Racing	42	Dodge	RSD	DAY	RCH	CAR	ATL	NWS	DAR	BRI	MAR	TAL	NSV	DOV	CLT	RSD	MCH; 13	DAY	NSV	POC	TAL; 38	MCH	BRI	DAR	RCH	DOV	MAR	NWS	CLT	CAR	ATL	ONT		77th	173	
1978	Robbins Racing	42	Dodge	RSD	DAY	RCH	CAR	ATL	BRI	DAR	NWS	MAR	TAL	DOV	CLT	NSV	RSD	MCH	DAY	NSV	POC	TAL; 18	MCH	BRI	DAR	RCH	DOV	MAR	NWS	CLT	CAR	ATL	ONT		85th	109	
1979	Robbins Racing	42	Dodge	RSD	DAY	CAR	RCH	ATL	NWS	BRI	DAR	MAR	TAL	NSV	DOV	CLT	TWS	RSD	MCH; 35	DAY	NSV	POC													70th	207	
1979	Robbins Racing	36	Dodge																				TAL; 32												70th	207	
1979	Robbins Racing	6	Dodge																					MCH; 27	BRI	DAR	RCH	DOV	MAR	CLT	NWS	CAR	ATL	ONT	70th	207	
1980	Robbins Racing	6	Dodge	RSD	DAY	RCH	CAR	ATL	BRI	DAR	NWS	MAR	TAL; 33	NSV	DOV	CLT	TWS	RSD	MCH				TAL; 13	MCH	BRI	DAR	RCH	DOV	NWS	MAR					71st	204	
1980	Warren Racing	79	Dodge																	DAY; 30	NSV	POC													71st	204	
1980	M.C. Anderson Racing	6	Chevy																												CLT; 32	CAR	ATL	ONT	71st	204	
1982	Robbins Racing	22	Buick	DAY	RCH	BRI	ATL	CAR	DAR	NWS	MAR	TAL	NSV	DOV	CLT	POC	RSD	MCH	DAY; 37	NSV	POC	TAL	MCH; DNQ	BRI	DAR	RCH	DOV	NWS	CLT	MAR	CAR	ATL; 33	RSD		79th	116	

==== Daytona 500 ====
Year	Team	Manufacturer	Start	Finish
1973	Robbins Racing	Dodge	37	34
1975	Robbins Racing	Dodge	28	39

== Sources ==
- Pruett, Barbara J. Marty Robbins: Fast Cars and Country Music. Lanham, MD: Scarecrow Press. 2007. ISBN 0-8108-6036-8
- Diekman, Diane. Twentieth Century Drifter: The Life of Marty Robbins (Music in American Life). 2012.
- Fallout: New Vegas – Big Iron is used on Radio New Vegas, Mojave Music Radio, and Black Mountain Radio.
