= Van Ronk Sings =

Studio album by Dave Van Ronk
- Released: July 1961
- Genre: Folk
- Label: Folkways (FA 2383)

Dave Van Ronk chronology
Dave Van Ronk and the Ragtime Jug Stompers (1960)	Van Ronk Sings (1961)	Folksinger (1963)

Alternative Cover
- Cover of the 1965 LP reissue as Dave Van Ronk Sings the Blues.

Van Ronk Sings is an album by American folksinger Dave Van Ronk, released in July 1961.

It was also released on LP as Dave Van Ronk Sings the Blues and Dave Van Ronk Sings Earthy Ballads and Blues. All these versions are out of print, but most of the songs can be found on the 1991 Smithsonian Folkways CD release The Folkways Years, 1959–1961 and A Chrestomathy, released on CD in 1992.

== Reception ==
Professional ratings
Review scores
Source	Rating
Allmusic	3.5/5 stars

Writing for Allmusic, critic William Ruhlman wrote of the album "Dave Van Ronk's approach to performing traditional folk songs and blues tunes is sufficiently unusual to require a sleeve note from the singer to justify it. Unlike other white, Northern, urban folksingers, who perform such material but do so in their own natural voices, Van Ronk takes much of his style from the black, Southern, rural singers who have performed it before him... he can sing in a way that serves the material and, despite the attempt at imitation, comes off as his own individual sound."

== Track listing ==
=== Side one ===
1. "Bed Bug Blues" – 2:43
2. "Yas-Yas-Yas" (Traditional) – 2:05
3. "See That My Grave Is Kept Clean" (Blind Lemon Jefferson) – 2:54
4. "Tell Old Bill"
5. "Georgie on the IRT" – 3:28
6. "Hesitation Blues" (Rev. Gary Davis) – 2:32
7. "Hootchy Kootchy Man"
8. "Sweet Substitute"

=== Side two ===
1. "Dink's Song"
2. "River Come Down" – 3:43
3. "Just a Closer Walk With Thee (Traditional) – 3:00
4. "Come Back Baby" (Walter Davis) – 3:51
5. "Spike Driver's Moan" – 3:11
6. "Standing By My Window"
7. "Willie the Weeper" (Marty Bloom, Walter Melrose, Grant Rymal) – 2:47

== Personnel ==
- Dave Van Ronk - guitar, vocals
