= Van Ronk =

Studio album by Dave Van Ronk
- Released: August 1971
- Recorded: December 1970 – May 1971
- Studio: Sound Exchange Studios, New York City
- Genre: Folk
- Label: Polydor
- Producer: Dave Woods

Dave Van Ronk chronology
Dave Van Ronk and the Hudson Dusters (1967)	Van Ronk (1971)	Songs for Ageing Children (1973)

Van Ronk is an album by folk music artist Dave Van Ronk, released in 1971.

== History ==
Van Ronk features some of his most elaborate recordings with many backing musicians. It includes English language versions of songs by non-English speaking composers (Bertold Brecht and Jacques Brel).

Another release titled Van Ronk was issued as a double LP in 1972 by Fantasy Records by pairing Dave Van Ronk, Folksinger and Inside Dave Van Ronk. That collection was later released on CD as Inside Dave Van Ronk.

== Reception ==
Professional ratings
Review scores
Source	Rating
Christgau's Record Guide	B+

Village Voice critic Robert Christgau wrote of Van Ronk: "He shoots his shot at big-label production here, and now and then the orchestration (not to mention the material) turns surprisingly schmaltzy, but for the most part this shouted melee of song collection is a riot."

== Track listing ==
=== Side one ===
1. "Bird on the Wire" (Leonard Cohen) – 3:55
2. "Fox's Minstrel Show" (Michael Small) – 3:05
3. "Port of Amsterdam" (Jacques Brel, Eric Blau, Mort Shuman) – 3:25
4. "Fat Old John" (Peter Stampfel) – 1:06
5. "Urge for Going" (Joni Mitchell) – 4:37

=== Side two ===
1. "Random Canyon" (Peter Stampfel) – 2:05
2. "I Think It's Going to Rain Today" (Randy Newman) – 3:50
3. "Gaslight Rag" (Dave Van Ronk) – 2:55
4. "Honey Hair" (Van Ronk) – 3:15
5. "Legend of the Dead Soldier" (Bertolt Brecht, Eric Bentley) – 4:05
6. "Ac-Cent-Tchu-Ate the Positive" (Johnny Mercer, Harold Arlen) – 2:30

== Personnel ==
- Dave Van Ronk – vocals, guitar

== Production notes ==
- All Songs Arranged by Dave Woods except "Gaslight Rag" by Dave Van Ronk
- Produced by Dave Woods
- Engineered by Steve Katz
- Cover Art by Anne Friedman
- Morale by Joanne Grace
- Manager – Ron Shelley
- Spiritual – John Jameson
- Polydor: Karen Austin, Jon Sagen
