= Hesitation Blues (album) =

Compilation album by Dave Van Ronk
- Released: 1988
- Genre: Folk
- Label: Big Beat

Dave Van Ronk chronology
Going Back to Brooklyn (1985)	Hesitation Blues (1988)	Inside Dave Van Ronk (compilation) (1989)

Hesitation Blues is a compilation album by American folk and blues singer Dave Van Ronk, released in 1988.

== History ==
The 16 songs in the compilation come from three '60s Prestige LPs — Dave Van Ronk, Folksinger, In the Tradition, and the original Inside Dave Van Ronk. Most of the songs appear on the Fantasy compilation CD Inside Dave Van Ronk.

== Reception ==
Professional ratings
Review scores
Source	Rating
Allmusic	4.5/5 stars

Writing for Allmusic, critic Richie Unterberger wrote of the album "Good compilation of 16 songs from three '60s Prestige LPs... that probably represent his peak as a recording artist."

== Track listing ==
1. "Samson and Delilah" (Traditional) – 2:35
2. "Fixin' to Die" (White) – 2:52
3. "Long John" (Traditional) – 2:08
4. "Motherless Children" (Traditional) – 3:48
5. "I Buyed Me a Little Dog"
6. "Poor Lazarus" (Traditional) – 5:08
7. "Cruel Ship's Captain Traditional)
8. "Kansas City Blues" (Jackson) – 2:10
9. "House Carpenter" (Traditional)
10. "Fair and Tender Ladies" (Traditional)
11. "Hesitation Blues" (Davis) – 3:32
12. "Hang Me, Oh Hang Me" (Traditional)
13. "Come Back Baby" (Davis)
14. "Sprig of Thyme" (Traditional)
15. "Silver Dagger" (Traditional)
16. "Death Letter Blues" (Traditional)

== Personnel ==
- Dave Van Ronk – vocals, guitar
