= I Wish I Could Shimmy Like My Sister Kate =

1922 jazz dance song by Armand J. Piron

"I Wish I Could Shimmy Like My Sister Kate", often simply "Sister Kate", is an up-tempo jazz dance song written by Armand J. Piron and published in 1922. The lyrics are narrated in the first person by Kate's sister, who sings about Kate's dancing and her wish to emulate it. She laments that she's not quite "up to date", but believes that dancing the Shimmy like "Sister Kate" will rectify this and let her impress "all the boys in the neighborhood" as well.

== Authorship dispute ==
Kid Ory recorded the song with alternative lyrics by Louis Armstrong in Denmark on November 13, 1959, though these lyrics were never used in the US. Armstrong claimed he had written the song and sold it for $50. According to Armstrong, Kate was a murdered brothel madame named Katie Townsend.

== Early recordings ==
Early recordings listed at Discogs include 1922 sides by Mary Straine and Joseph Smith's Jazz Band on Black Swan Records; The Virginians on Victor; and The Original Memphis Five, as an instrumental, on Pathé Actuelle. Vocalist Anna Jones recorded it accompanied by Fats Waller on piano in 1923. Arrangements ranged from big-band jazz to the Alabama Jug Band in the 1930s, a precursor to jug-band revival versions in the 1960s by Dave Van Ronk and Jim Kweskin.

== Folk and jug-band revival ==
The song arrived in the 1960s and 1970s folk scene thanks to Dave Van Ronk, who recorded it twice — on In the Tradition and on Dave Van Ronk and the Ragtime Jug Stompers — and Jim Kweskin, who made it part of a "Sister Kate's Night Out" medley on his Relax Your Mind album with Mel Lyman and Fritz Richmond. In 1967, the Nitty Gritty Dirt Band included it on their eponymous album, The Nitty Gritty Dirt Band (album).

== Other recordings and cover versions ==
The song has been performed and recorded by many artists over the years, including:

- Frances Faye and Rusty Warren
- Shel Silverstein (1959)
- The Olympics (1960, released as "Shimmy Like Kate")
- the Red Onion Band
- The Remo Four, a beat version (1964)
- The Beatles, performed live in 1962, with a recording appearing on Live! at the Star-Club in Hamburg, Germany; 1962
- Judith Durham, on her album Judith Durham and The Hottest Band in Town (1974)
- The Blue Rags, on their 1997 album Rag-N-Roll
- The Ditty Bops and The Livin' Blues (a 1960s Dutch blues band), both on self-titled 2004 releases
- Cécile McLorin Salvant, in a 2014 video

== In film and television ==
- Performed by Betty Grable in the 1950 film Wabash Avenue; a clip appears in the 1956 film The Girl Can't Help It.
- Featured on The Carol Burnett Show (Episode 7.6, 1973)
- Featured on All in the Family during its final season (1978), in which Edith and Stephanie plan to sing it for a school talent show
- Heard in the background of the season 4 finale of Boardwalk Empire
- Performed in "The Good Old Days" episode of The Danny Thomas Show (Season 5, Episode 25)

== Influence ==
David Bowie used to pair this song with an updated version of the Flares' 1960 doo-wop song "Foot Stompin'" during the Diamond Dogs Tour, as heard on the compilation Rarestonebowie. Guitarist Carlos Alomar blessed the update with a riff that became Bowie's hit "Fame", co-written with John Lennon. A passage from the song is also used in the poem Interview, written by Vijay Seshadri.
