= Live at Sir George Williams University =

Live album by Dave Van Ronk
- Released: November 18, 1997
- Recorded: January 27, 1967
- Genre: Folk
- Length: 41:48
- Label: Just a Memory
- Producer: Michael Nerenberg

Dave Van Ronk chronology
From... Another Time & Place (1995)	Live at Sir George Williams University (1997)	Sweet & Lowdown (2001)

Live at Sir George Williams University is a live album by Dave Van Ronk, re-released in 1997. This recording was done live as a joint concert of the folk music societies of McGill and Sir George Williams Universities in 1967, at Sir George Williams University, in Montreal, Quebec, Canada, and also featured Rev. Gary Davis on the same bill.

== Reception ==
Professional ratings
Review scores
Source	Rating
Allmusic	4/5 stars
The Penguin Guide to Blues Recordings	3/4 stars

Writing for Allmusic, critic Lindsay Planer wrote of the album "Van Ronk's amenable nature is also evident in his interaction with the audience as he tells short jokes between numbers — especially notable is his "W.C. Fields Routine," proving yet again that this is no standard folky. Dave Van Ronk comes from a dying breed of entertainers who were adept at weaving a continuity into whatever they doing... Much of this set mirrors both the music he chose for inclusion on his long-players as well as tunes he would continue to perform throughout the remainder of his career. Van Ronk steers the show through a seemingly infinite maze of musical genres and influences."

== Track listing ==
1. "Gambler's Blues" (Traditional) – 4:41
2. "That Will Never Happen No More" (Blind Blake) – 4:17
3. "The Old Man" (Bob Dylan) – 2:05
4. "St. Louis Tickle" (Barney, Seymour) – 3:06
5. "Frankie and Albert" (Traditional) – 4:07
6. "Down and Out" (Traditional) – 2:39
7. "W.C. Fields Routine" (Traditional) – :48
8. "Mack the Knife" (Marc Blitzstein, Bertolt Brecht, Kurt Weill) – 3:26
9. "Song of the Wandering Angus" (Judy Collins, William Butler Yeats) – 4:48
10. "Mean World Blues" (Miller) – 2:57
11. "Keep It Clean" (Charley Jordan) – 2:38
12. "Statesboro Blues" (McTell) – 2:06
13. "Cocaine" (Davis) – 4:10

== Personnel ==
- Dave Van Ronk – vocals, guitar

== Production notes ==
- Michael Nerenberg – engineer, liner notes, reissue producer, photography
- Jim West – executive producer
