= St. James Infirmary (album) =

- Original St. James Infirmary LP cover.

Live album by Dave Van Ronk
- Released: 1983
- Recorded: April 5–6, 1983
- Venue: Théâtre Du Forum Des Halles, Paris
- Studio: Anagramme Studios, Paris
- Genre: Folk
- Length: 42:20
- Label: Paris (DKB 3359)

Dave Van Ronk chronology
Your Basic Dave Van Ronk (1982)	St. James Infirmary (1983)	Dave Van Ronk in Rome (1983)

Alternative Cover
- Cover of the 1996 reissue as Statesboro Blues.

St. James Infirmary is a partially live album by American folk and blues singer Dave Van Ronk, released in 1983. It was re-released on CD in 1996 as Statesboro Blues by EPM Musique.

The first seven tracks were recorded live at Théâtre Du Forum Des Halles, Paris and recorded on April 5, 1983.

== Track listing ==
1. "Intro" (Van Ronk) – :30
2. "Green Green Rocky Road" (Robert Kaufman) – 3:25
3. "Jesus Met the Woman at the Well" (Reverend Gary Davis) – 6:30
4. "Somebody Else But Me" (Van Ronk) – 3:40
5. "Come Back Baby (Let's Talk It over One More Time)" (Walter Davis) – 3:20
6. "The Boll Weevil" (Brook Benton) – 2:24
7. "St. James Infirmary" (Traditional) – 4:36
8. "Blood Red Moon" (Van Ronk) – 4:40
9. "Baby, Let Me Lay It on You" (Walter Coleman, Reverend Gary Davis) – 2:25
10. "Statesboro Blues" (Blind Willie McTell) – 2:41
11. "Dry Land Blues" (Furry Lewis) – 2:31
12. "Keep It Clean" (Charley Jordan) – 2:42
13. "Left Bank Blues" (Van Ronk) – 2:56

== Personnel ==
- Dave Van Ronk – vocals, guitar
