= Dave Van Ronk Sings Ballads, Blues, and a Spiritual =

Dave Van Ronk Sings Ballads, Blues and a Spiritual

Studio album by Dave Van Ronk
- Released: May 1959
- Genres: Folk, blues
- Label: Folkways
- Producer: Kenneth S. Goldstein

Dave Van Ronk chronology
| Dave Van Ronk Sings Ballads, Blues and a Spiritual (1959) | Dave Van Ronk and the Ragtime Jug Stompers (1960) |

Alternative Cover
- Cover of 1965 Verve reissue as Gambler's Blues

Dave Van Ronk Sings Ballads, Blues and a Spiritual is an album by the American folksinger Dave Van Ronk, released in May 1959 on Folkways Records.

It was also released on LP as Gambler's Blues and as Black Mountain Blues. Some of the songs can be found on the 1991 Smithsonian Folkways CD release The Folkways Years, 1959–1961.

== Track listing ==
=== Side one ===
1. "Duncan and Brady" – 3:00
2. "Black Mountain Blues" – 4:00
3. "In the Pines" – 3:04
4. "My Baby's So Sweet" – 2:32
5. "Twelve Gates to the City" – 3:12
6. "Winin' Boy Blues" – 2:35
7. "If You Leave Me Pretty Mama"

=== Side two ===
1. "Backwater Blues"
2. "Careless Love" (W.C. Handy, Martha E. Koenig, Spencer Williams) – 3:56
3. "Betty And Dupree"
4. "K. C. Moan"
5. "Gambler's Blues"
6. "John Henry"
7. "How Long"

== Personnel ==
- Dave Van Ronk - guitar, vocals
- David Gahr - photography
- Ronald Clyne - cover design
