= A Cottage for Sale =

Song by The Revelers
- Published: 1929
- Composer: Willard Robison
- Lyricist: Larry Conley

"A Cottage for Sale" is a popular song, with music by Willard Robison and lyrics by Larry Conley. It was published in 1929, and has been recorded over 100 times; the first ones to be released were by The Revelers in January 1930 and by Bernie Cummins with the New Yorker Orchestra in March 1930.

== Lyrics and themes ==
The song uses an empty cottage as a metaphor of a failed relationship or the end of a long relationship perhaps in death.

Our little dream castle
With every dream gone
Is lonely and silent
The shades are all drawn
And my heart is heavy
As I gaze upon
A cottage for sale

The lawn we were proud of
Is waving in hay
Our beautiful garden has
Withered away.
Where we planted roses
The weeds seem to say...
A cottage for sale

Through every window
I see your face
But when I reach (the) window
There's (only) empty space

The key's in the mailbox
The same as before
But no one is waiting for me anymore
The end of our story
Is there on the door
A cottage for sale.

== Recordings ==
The song has become a standard, with artists from a variety of genres creating many notable recordings. A partial list follows:

- 1930: Victor vocal quartet The Revelers
- 1930: Ruth Etting
- 1930: Grey Gull Studio Dance Band with vocalist Jack Parker (Piccadilly 616 / 3990-B)
- 1930: Guy Lombardo
- 1945: Billy Eckstine and His Orchestra went to number three on the Most-Played Juke Box Race Records chart and number eight on the pop chart.
- 1947: Mel Torme
- 1956: Dinah Washington (Dinah! album)
- 1957: Nat King Cole (Just One of Those Things album)
- 1957: Coleman Hawkins with an orchestra arranged and conducted by Glenn Osser (The Gilded Hawk album)
- 1958: Tony Bennett with Frank De Vol and his Orchestra (Long Ago and Far Away album)
- 1958: Frankie Laine
- 1959: Frank Sinatra (No One Cares album)
- 1959: Roy Hamilton (Have Blues Must Travel album)
- 1959: Chris Connor (Nina Simone and Her Friends album)
- 1960: Little Willie John (Sure Things album)
- 1960: Billy Eckstine (Once More with Feeling album)
- 1961: Howard McGhee (Dusty Blue album)
- 1963: Julie London (Love on the Rocks album Liberty Records LST 7249)
- 1963: Judy Garland
- 1965: Jack Teagarden (Think Well Of Me Verve Records V6 8465 album)
- 1968: Kay Starr and Count Basie (How About This album)
- 1968: James Brown (Thinking About Little Willie John and a Few Nice Things album)
- 1969: Bette McLaurin (The Masquerade Is Over album)
- 1978: Bill Farrell (Lush Life album)
- 1987: Chuck Berry sings the song, accompanied Johnnie Johnson on piano, in an intimate moment during rehearsal in his concert film Hail! Hail! Rock 'n' Roll
- 1992: Buddy Montgomery (Live at Maybeck Recital Hall, Volume Fifteen album)
- 1995: Etta Jones (At Last album)
- 1996: Jackie McLean (Hat Trick album)
- 2001: Dave Van Ronk (Sweet & Lowdown album)
- 2003: Jerry Jeff Walker (Jerry Jeff Jazz album)
- 2003: Holly Cole (Shade album)
- 2005: Les Deux Love Orchestra (King Kong album, featuring Bobby Woods on vocals and Page Cavanaugh on piano)
- 2005: Johnny Mathis (Isn't It Romantic: The Standards Album)
- 2010: Freddy Cole (Freddy Cole Sings Mr. B album)
- 2017: The Newfangled Four (The Newfangled Four album)
- 2021: Willie Nelson (That's Life album, Nelson's second tribute album to Frank Sinatra)

Other performances, date unknown:

- Teresa Brewer
- Vic Dickenson
- Jackie Gleason
- Jack Hylton
- Peggy Lee
- Della Reese
- Tiny Tim
