= Dave Van Ronk: ...And the Tin Pan Bended and the Story Ended... =

Dave Van Ronk: ...and the tin pan bended and the story ended...

Live album by Dave Van Ronk
- Released: June 29, 2004
- Recorded: October 22, 2001 in Takoma Park
- Genre: Folk
- Label: Smithsonian Folkways
- Producer: Christine Lavin, Andrea Vuocolo

Dave Van Ronk chronology
Two Sides of Dave Van Ronk (2002)	Dave Van Ronk: ...and the tin pan bended and the story ended... (2004)	The Mayor of MacDougal Street (2005)

...and the tin pan bended and the story ended... is a live album by American folksinger Dave Van Ronk, released in 2004. It was his last concert before his death in 2002 of colon cancer.

== Reception ==
Professional ratings
Review scores
Source	Rating
Allmusic	4/5 stars
No Depression	(no rating)

Writing for Allmusic, critic Steve Leggett noted Van Ronk's illness and wrote of the album "Van Ronk's deliberate jazz phrasing is still there, as are the signature guitar skills, but the gruff power in his voice is all but gone, replaced by a soft, hoarse whisper, and there are many times when you can hear his difficulty drawing breath in the spaces between singing. All of this brings a tremendous intimacy and poignancy to several of the songs here... Newcomers to Van Ronk's music should probably sample his earlier albums first, since they give a clearer version of this performer in his prime." Critic Luke Torn of No Depression wrote of the album "This remarkable recording of Van Ronk’s last concert (recorded in October 2001) is the fondest of goodbyes. Generous of spirit, with lots of crazy stories and a full repertoire played with verve and passion, Van Ronk touches on the full spectrum of the American songbook."

== Track listing ==
1. "Down South Blues" (Traditional) – 4:20
2. "Dave Speaks" – 7:34
3. "You've Been a Good Old Wagon" (Henry) – 2:04
4. "Dave Speaks" – 2:28
5. "Don't You Leave Me Here" – 3:18
6. "Dave Speaks" – 1:53
7. "Did You Hear John Hurt?" (Paxton) – 2:34
8. "Dave Speaks" – 5:21
9. "Green, Green Rocky Road" (Chandler, Kaufman) – 3:42
10. "Dave Speaks" – 0:28
11. "Jelly Jelly" (Eckstine, Hines) – 2:49
12. "Nobody Knows You (When You're Down and Out)" (Cox) – 3:58
13. "Dave Speaks" – 4:41
14. "One Meatball" (Singer, Zaret) – 1:56
15. "Buckets of Rain" (Bob Dylan) – 4:01
16. "Dave Speaks" – 1:31
17. "Sometime (Whatcha Gonna Do)" (White) – 2:37
18. "Sportin' Life Blues" (Brownie McGhee) – 4:07
19. "Dave Speaks" – 3:29
20. "Ace in the Hole" (Dempsey, Mitchell, Van Ronk) – 4:17
21. "Dave Speaks" – 2:57
22. "St. James Infirmary" (Primrose, Traditional) – 3:50
23. "Thank You" – 0:21
24. "Urge for Going" (Joni Mitchell) – 4:29

== Personnel ==
- Dave Van Ronk - vocals, guitar

== Production notes ==
- Produced by Christine Lavin, Andrea Vuocolo
- Mitch Greenhill – executive producer
- Engineered by David Eisner and David W. Richardson
- Assistant engineer – Norman van der Sluys
- Mastered by Phil Klum
- Photography by Joe Deuel, John Isaac, Joel Katz, Aaron Rennert, Dave Peabody, Raymond Sullivan, Sharon Seidel Vargas, Andrea Vuocolo
- Liner notes, annotation by Tom Paxton, Elijah Wald
- Design, Layout Design – Sonya Cohen Cramer
- Archivist – Jeff Place
