= No Dirty Names =

Studio album by Dave Van Ronk
- Released: 1966
- Genre: Folk
- Label: Verve Forecast
- Producer: Jerry Schoenbaum

Dave Van Ronk chronology
| Just Dave Van Ronk (1964) | No Dirty Names (1966) | Dave Van Ronk and the Hudson Dusters (1967) |

No Dirty Names is a 1966 album by artist Dave Van Ronk. It features the first recorded version of Bob Dylan's song "The Old Man".

== Reception ==
Professional ratings
Review scores
| Source | Rating |
|---|---|
| Allmusic | 3/5 stars |

Writing for Allmusic, critic Richie Unterberger wrote about the album "While this is certainly among the more obscure of Dave Van Ronk's early LPs (none of which were exactly big sellers), it's one of the better ones. It's not radically different from most of the folk-blues albums he made in his early career. But there's a little more variety to the arrangements and repertoire than usual, with just as much of Van Ronk's growling gruff voice as always".

== Track listing ==
1. "One Meatball" (Josh White) – 3:04
2. "One Of These Days" (Mose Allison) – 2:55
3. "Song Of The Wandering Aengus" (words by William Butler Yeats, music by Travis Edmonson; mistakenly attributed to Judy Collins) – 5:25
4. "Keep It Clean" (Charley Jordan; not credited on the album) – 2:27
5. "Zen Koans Gonna Rise Again" (Dave Van Ronk) – 3:39
6. "Freddie" (Mance Lipscomb) – 2:05
7. "Statesboro Blues" (Blind Willie McTell) – 2:12
8. "Midnight Hour" Blues (Leroy Carr) – 4:55
9. "Bout A Spoonful" (Gary Davis) – 2:18
10. "Mean World Blues" (Niela Horn) – 2:19
11. "Blues Chante" (Dizzy Gillespie) – 2:40
12. "The Old Man" (Bob Dylan) – 1:33
13. "Alabama Song" (Bertold Brecht, Kurt Weill, arr. Dave Van Ronk) – 5:19

All tracks arranged by Van Ronk

== Personnel ==
- Dave Van Ronk – vocals, guitar
- Dave Woods – guitar
- Chuck Israels – bass
- Barry Kornfield – organ
- Terri Van Ronk – scream
- John Court – scream

== Production notes ==
- Val Valentin – engineer
- Jack Anesh – cover design
- Charles Stewart – cover photograph
- Jerry Schoenbaum – production supervisor
