= Your Basic Dave Van Ronk =

Studio album by Dave Van Ronk
- Released: 1982
- Genre: Folk
- Label: Kicking Mule
- Producer: Karl Dallas

Dave Van Ronk chronology
Somebody Else, Not Me (1980)	Your Basic Dave Van Ronk (1982)	St. James Infirmary (1983)

Alternative Cover
- Cover of the UK Sonet issue of the LP

Your Basic Dave Van Ronk is an album by American folk and blues singer Dave Van Ronk, released in 1982.

Your Basic Dave Van Ronk was recorded in one single night session in London in 1981. It is out-of-print but was re-released along with In the Tradition in 2002 by Fantasy Records as Two Sides of Dave Van Ronk. The reissue does not include "In the Midnight Hour" and "Stagolee".

== Track listing ==
1. "God Bless the Child" (Arthur Herzog, Jr., Billie Holiday) – 4:25
2. "Sunday Street" (Van Ronk) – 3:20
3. "In the Midnight Hour"
4. "Stagolee" (Traditional)
5. "Sportin' Life" (Brownie McGhee) – 4:56
6. "Cocaine" (Reverend Gary Davis) – 4:30
7. "St. James Infirmary" (Joe Primrose, Traditional) – 5:00
8. "You've Been a Good Ole Wagon" (Henry) – 2:52
9. "Spike Driver Blues" (Mississippi John Hurt) – 4:15
10. "Gaslight Rag" (Van Ronk) – 2:13
11. "Candy Man" (Davis) – 3:04

== Personnel ==
- Dave Van Ronk – vocals, guitar
