= Peter and the Wolf (Dave Van Ronk album) =

Studio album by Dave Van Ronk
- Released: 1990
- Genre: Folk

Dave Van Ronk chronology
Hummin' to Myself (1990)	Peter and the Wolf (1990)	The Folkways Years, 1959–1961 (1991)

Dave van Ronk presents Peter and the Wolf with Uncle Moose and the Kazoo-O-Phonic Jug Band is a 1990 album by Dave Van Ronk.

== Track listing ==
1. "Peter and the Wolf" (18:57)
  a) Introduction (5:39)
  b) Story (13:18)
2. "Swing on a Star" (Jimmy Van Heusen, Johnny Burke) (2:59)
3. "I'm Proud To Be a Moose" (Willy Nininger) (3:08)
4. "Fooling Frog" (traditional) (3:17)
5. "Mairzy Doats" (Drak, Hoffman, Livingston) (3:02)
6. "Teddy Bear's Picnic" (Lyrics: Jimmy Kennedy, Music: John W. Bratton) (3:04)
7. "Green, Green Rocky Road" (Len Chandler) (3:55)

== Details ==
=== Track 1 ===
- Uncle Moose (Dave Van Ronk)- narrator
- Billy Novlck - pennywhistle. clarinet, wolf, kazoo. Jaw harp
- Jay Ungar - fiddle, mandolin
- Luke Faust - Jug, Jaw harp
- Mark Greenberg - guitar, mandolin, banjo, washtub bass
- Gordon Stone - hot banjo solo

=== Other tracks ===
- Dave Van Ronk - all vocals, guitar on #1,2,6, kazoo on #5
- Billy Novlck - pennywhistle, clarinet, harmony vocal on #/, kazoo on #5
- Jay Ungar - fiddle, mandolin
- Luke Faust - Jug, harmony vocal on #7
- Mark Greenberg - banjo, guitar on #3,4.5,6 with
- Jeff Salisbury - washboard on #3, wood blocks on #4 The Kazoo-o-phonfc Chorus on #5;
- Emily Bond, Mlchaela Page, Brlgld Houton, Katherlne Manock, Emily Dill, Maribeth Long, Kim Sudol, Cathy Elwert, Leah Greenberg. And Ms. A. Nonny Moose - Interjection on #3 ' from AMERICAN CHILDREN - Alacazam! 1002
- All material, except 'MOOSE", recorded and mixed at TKO Studio, Stowe, Vermont and Charles Eller Studio, Burlington, Vermont by Chuck Eller. "MOOSE' recorded and produced by Marc Black and Ed Bialek / Black Market
