= Dink's Song =

Song
- Written: Unknown
- Genre: Folk
- Songwriter: Unknown

"Dink's Song" (sometimes known as "Fare Thee Well" or "Dink's Blues") is an American folk song played by many folk revival musicians such as Pete Seeger, Fred Neil, Bob Dylan, Joan Baez, Dave Van Ronk, Kate & Anna McGarrigle, and Cisco Houston as well as more recent musicians like Jeff Buckley and Waylon Jennings. The song tells the story of a woman deserted by her lover when she needs him the most.

== History ==
The first historical record of the song was made by ethnomusicologist John Lomax in 1909, who recorded it as sung by an African American woman called Dink, as she washed her husband's clothes in a tent camp of migratory levee-builders on the bank of the Brazos River, a few miles from Houston, Texas. According to Lomax, Dink was initially unwilling to sing, but was convinced in exchange for a bottle of gin.

The text of the song was first published by Lomax in a 1917 article in the magazine The Nation, while the music was first published in 1934 in the book American Ballads and Folk Songs by John Lomax and his son, Alan. The text was additionally published in Folk song U.S.A.: the 111 best American ballads by John and Alan Lomax in 1947.

English folksinger and songwriter Cyril Tawney, while serving in the Royal Navy aboard the HMS Indefatigable, found the song in the Lomaxes' book American Ballads and Folk Songs. He was struck by the first verse, and incorporated it into the second verse of his song about the navy, "The Grey Funnel Line".

== Lyrics ==
As with many traditional songs, there are numerous versions of the lyrics. The version published in American Ballads and Folk Songs is rendered in an approximation of African American vernacular English.

Ef I had wings like Norah's dove,
I'd fly up the river to the man I love.
Fare thee well, O Honey, fare thee well.

Ise got a man, an' he's long and tall,
Moves his body like a cannon ball,
Fare thee well, O Honey, fare thee well.

One o' dese days, an' it won't be long,
Call my name an' I'll be gone.
Fare thee well, O Honey, fare thee well.

'Member one night, a-drizzlin' rain,
Roun' my heart I felt a pain.
Fare thee well, O Honey, fare thee well.

When I wo' my ap'ons low,
Couldn't keep you from my do'.
Fare thee well, O Honey, fare thee well.

Now I wears my ap'ons high,
Sca'cely ever see you passin' by.
Fare thee well, O Honey, fare thee well.

Now my ap'on's up to my chin,
You pass my do' an' you won' come in,
Fare thee well, O Honey, fare thee well.

Ef I had listened to whut my mama said,
I'd be at home in my mama's bed.
Fare thee well, O Honey, fare thee well.

== Notable versions ==
Libby Holman recorded "Dink's Song" (as "Fare Thee Well") with guitar accompaniment by Josh White in 1942.

White also recorded the song as "Fare Thee Well" in 1945. It appeared on his first album, Songs by Josh White, for Asch Records (A 348). (Asch Records was the predecessor of Folkways Records). Like the rest of the songs on the album, it was performed solo, with guitar. White re-recorded the song at least once later in his career, as "Dink's Blues". It appears on the 1957 Mercury album, Josh White's Blues (MG 20203).

In the 1946 film Cloak and Dagger, the character played by Lilli Palmer sings a verse of the song to Gary Cooper's character, explaining she learned it from an American airman from "New Arizona" and adding she didn't have the chance to learn the rest of it.

Burl Ives also recorded the song as “Fare Thee Well” on Return of the Wayfaring Stranger (1960).

The song was performed by Mary "Mississippi" Brown (Peggy Castle) on the television show Cheyenne, in the episode "Fury at Rio Hondo", which aired April 17, 1956.

Ken Curtis crooned an abbreviated version of the song on the show Have Gun - Will Travel, in the episode "Love's Young Dream" (Season 4, Episode 2).

Bob Dylan recorded a driving rendition of the song on the 1961 "Minnesota Hotel Tape" (actually recorded in the home of Bonnie Beecher). After his performance, he suggests he had originally heard the song from Dink, personally. The recording was released in 2005 on The Bootleg Series Vol. 7: No Direction Home: The Soundtrack.

The song was also recorded by Burl Ives (circa 1965).

Dave Van Ronk recorded the song in 1961 for his album Van Ronk Sings. He then went on to record a new version of the song in 1967 for his album Dave Van Ronk and the Hudson Dusters, where it was credited to John Lomax and his first wife, Bess Brown Lomax. In the liner notes to the album, Van Ronk writes that he considers the tune "probably the best piece of singing as such I've ever done on record." He goes on to explain, "I had a nasty flu when we cut this one, and my voice had gone pre-laryngitic. This had the effect of opening up an octave valve I didn't even know I had. The next day I couldn't talk, let alone sing."

Jeff Buckley recorded an 11-minute version live in a New York café in 1993 that was posthumously released in 2003 on his album Live at Sin-é (Legacy Edition).

Gloria Lynne recorded the song for a concept album created and produced by Harry Belafonte in 2001, titled The Long Road to Freedom: An Anthology of Black Music. In Lynne's version the song is called "Fare Thee Well, Oh Honey."

In 2005 Joan Baez included it on her album Bowery Songs, calling it “Dink’s Song”.

A different arrangement of the song was written and performed by Frank Black on his 2006 album Fast Man Raider Man. Puerto Rican singer Gabriel Ríos included the song on the limited edition 2-disc release of his album Angelhead.

Oscar Isaac and Marcus Mumford's performance of "Dink's Song" is featured in the Coen Brothers's film Inside Llewyn Davis, as well as a solo acoustic version by Isaac. Both versions are included on the original soundtrack album.

The song was also performed by Chuck/God (Rob Benedict) on the television show Supernatural, at the end of the episode "Don't Call Me Shurley."

The British folk musical group The Longest Johns included a rendition of the song on their 2023 album C-Sides.

Joni Mitchell performed "Fare Thee Well (Dink's Song)" early in her career and it was recorded when she appeared on radio station CFQC, circa 1963. This rendition was released in 2020 on Joni Mitchell Archives – Vol. 1: The Early Years (1963–1967).

The song would be the closing track to Waylon Jennings' 2025 album Songbird.

== Notes ==
- Heylin, Clinton (2003). Bob Dylan: Behind the Shades Revisited. Perennial Currents. ISBN 0-06-052569-X
- Lomax, John A (1971) [1947]. Adventures of a Ballad Hunter. Macmillan. ISBN 0-02-848480-0
- Lomax, John A., Alan Lomax, and John William Thompson, eds (1934). American Ballads and Folk Songs. Macmillan. (Dover rpt., 1994) ISBN 0-486-28276-7
