= The Unfortunate Rake (album) =

Compilation album by Various Artists
- Released: 1960
- Genre: Folk
- Length: 50:30
- Label: Folkways
- Producer: Kenneth S. Goldstein

The Unfortunate Rake is an album released by Folkways Records in 1960, containing 20 different variations from what is sometimes called the 'Rake' cycle of ballads. The album repeats a claim made by Phillips Barry in 1911 that the song is Irish in origin, a claim made on the basis of a fragment called "My Jewel My Joy" collected in Ireland in 1848. The song is incorrectly said to have been heard in Dublin, when the cited source states it was collected and had been heard in Cork. However, the notes to the album make no mention of what is now thought to be the oldest written version of the song, one called "The Buck's Elegy".

The album contains what appears to be claimed to be one of the earliest-known written versions of the whole song, a "19th century broadside text", sung by A L Lloyd. No source reference is given for this song. The liner notes refer the reader to an article written by Lloyd for "Sing" magazine in 1956. In this article, Lloyd refers to the 19th century broadside published by Such, which is a song called "The Unfortunate Lad". However, the words sung by Lloyd are not identical to those on the Such broadside. Significantly, in view of the research later done on the origin of the song St James' Infirmary, and in view of attempts to find a British hospital with the name St James', some of which research cites this LP as a source, the words St James' Hospital do not feature on the Such broadside, nor in "The Buck's Elegy".

The album also includes the variations that evolved from the earliest song, including the American standards "St. James Infirmary Blues" and "The Streets of Laredo". The album also contains songs written for humorous and political purposes, like "The Ballad of Sherman Wu" and "The Professor's Lament".

== Track listing ==
1. "The Unfortunate Rake" - A. L. Lloyd and Alf Edwards – 2:59
2. "The Trooper Cut Down in His Prime" - Ewan MacColl and Peggy Seeger – 4:30
3. "The Young Sailor Cut Down in His Prime" - Harry Cox – 1:57
4. "Noo I'm a Young Man Cut Down in My Prime" - Willie Mathieson – 2:17
5. "The Bad Girl's Lament" - Wade Hemsworth – 2:49
6. "One Morning in May" - Hally Wood – 2:36
7. "Bright Summer Morning" - Viola Penn – 2:24
8. "The Girl in the Dilger Case" - D. K. Wilgus – 1:08
9. "The Cowboy's Lament" - Bruce Buckley – 2:39
10. "Streets of Laredo" - Harry Jackson – 4:59
11. "St. James Hospital" - Alan Lomax – 3:33
12. "Gambler's Blues" - Dave Van Ronk – 2:44
13. "I Once Was a Carman" - "I Once Was a Carman in the Big Mountain Con" - Guthrie T. "Gus" Meade – 1:12
14. "The Lineman's Hymn" - Rosalie Sorrels – 1:49
15. "The Wild Lumberjack" - Kenneth S. Goldstein – 1:51
16. "A Sun Valley Song" - Jan Brunvand and Ellen Stekert – 1:28
17. "The Ballad of Bloody Thursday" - John Greenway – 3:44
18. "Streets of Hamtramck" - Bill Friedland, Mark Newman, and Morris Howarth – 2:23
19. "The Ballad of Sherman Wu" - Pete Seeger – 2:07
20. "The Professor's Lament" - Roger Abrahams – 3:25
