= Hummin' to Myself =

Hummin' to Myself may refer to:

- Hummin' to Myself (Linda Ronstadt album), 2004
- Hummin' to Myself (Dave Van Ronk album), 1990
