= Somebody Else, Not Me =

- Original LP album cover.

Studio album by Dave Van Ronk
- Released: 1980
- Genre: Folk
- Label: Philo
- Producer: Mitch Greenhill, Charles Eller

Dave Van Ronk chronology
Sunday Street (1976)	Somebody Else, Not Me (1980)	Your Basic Dave Van Ronk (1982)

Alternative Cover
- Cover of the reissue of Someone Else, Not Me.

Somebody Else, Not Me is a 1980 album by American folk and blues singer Dave Van Ronk.

Somebody Else, Not Me continues Van Ronk's return to basic blues, folk and jazz accompanying himself on guitar. It was reissued (with a slight change of name) as Someone Else, Not Me on CD by Philo in 1999. It was originally to be released in the late 1970s as the follow-up to Sunday Street. The cover of Bob Dylan's "Song to Woody" was the second original Dylan song Van Ronk recalled hearing, at the Gaslight Cafe.

== Reception ==
Professional ratings
Review scores
Source	Rating
AllMusic	3/5 stars
The Penguin Guide to Blues Recordings	2.5/4 stars

The Boston Globe called the album "a powerful, if unfocused, assortment of traditional blues and ragtime, plus a dose of whimsy and more current material."

For AllMusic, critic William Ruhlman wrote: "If the result was not quite the equal of Sunday Street, it was in the same league and continued Van Ronk's mature renaissance."

== Track listing ==
1. "Michigan Water Blues" (Clarence Williams) – 3:05
2. "Somebody Else, Not Me" (Van Ronk, Bert Williams) – 4:04
3. "Old Hannah" (Traditional) – 5:41
4. "The Entertainer" (Scott Joplin) – 4:57
5. "Did You Hear John Hurt?" (Tom Paxton) – 3:12
6. "Old Blue" (Traditional; arranged by Dave Van Ronk) – 3:50
7. "Sportin' Life" (Brownie McGhee) – 3:42
8. "Casey Jones" (Furry Lewis) – 4:46
9. "Pastures of Plenty" (Woody Guthrie) – 4:27
10. "Song to Woody" (Bob Dylan) – 3:57

== Personnel ==
- Dave Van Ronk – vocals, guitar

Production

- Produced by Mitch Greenhill & Charles Eller
- Mastered by Matt Murman
- Liner notes by Dave Van Ronk
- Photography by David Gahr
- Design by Francisco Gonzalez
- Reissue liner notes by Elijah Wald
