= Willard Robison =

American songwriter (1894–1968)

Background information
- Born: September 18, 1894; Shelbina, Missouri, U.S.
- Died: June 24, 1968 (aged 73) United States
- Genres: Jazz
- Occupations: Composer, songwriter, vocalist, pianist
- Labels: Perfect Records; Pathé Records; Columbia Records; Harmony Records; Victor Records; Master Records

Willard Robison (September 18, 1894 – June 24, 1968) was an American vocalist, pianist, and composer of popular songs, born in Shelbina, Missouri. His songs reflect a rural, melancholy theme steeped in Americana and their warm style has drawn comparison to Hoagy Carmichael. Many of his compositions, notably "A Cottage for Sale", "Round My Old Deserted Farm", "Don't Smoke in Bed", "'Taint So, Honey, 'Taint So" and "Old Folks", have become standards and have been recorded countless times by jazz and pop artists including Peggy Lee, Nina Simone, Nat King Cole, Billy Eckstine, Bing Crosby and Mildred Bailey. "A Cottage for Sale" alone has been recorded over 100 times.

== Life and career ==
In the early 1920s, Robison led and toured with several territory bands in the Southwest. He met Jack Teagarden in this period, whom he befriended. In the late 1920s, Robison organized the Deep River Orchestra, later hosting a radio show entitled The Deep River Hour in the early 1930s.

During the 1920s, Robison recorded extensively for Perfect Records, with scores of vocal recordings accompanying himself on piano (displaying his rather eccentric stride piano style), as well as "Deep River Orchestra" recordings using standard stock arrangements (including many popular and obscure songs) One recording was his fox trot arrangement of George Gershwin's Rhapsody In Blue on both sides of Perfect 14825 and Pathe 36644.

In Alec Wilder's definitive study, American Popular Song: The Great Innovators, 1900–1950, the songwriter and critic writes of Robison:

He, if ever there was one, was the maverick among song writers. Everyone loved him and many tried to help him, among them John Mercer. Mildred Bailey revered him and sang every song of his she could lay her hands on...He did manage, during his almost euphoric life, to write a few successful songs--A Cottage for Sale, and 'Taint so, My Honey, 'Taint So--but generally his songs were known only to a few singers and lovers of the off-beat and the non-urban song. He had a special flair for gentleness and childhood, the lost and the religious.

Wilder concludes that although Robison's songs may not have significantly influenced the development of American popular song, "[I]f they could so much bolster John Mercer's conviction that there was more to write lyrics about than city life, that the world of memory, of remembered sayings and scenes, was as evocative as the whispered words of lovers, then he did make a contribution."

=== American Suite songs ===
In 1926-1927, Robison recorded a series of eight jazz songs under name of American Suite:

- "After Hours" (American Suite No. 1) (Perfect 14728/Pathe 36547) 10/1/26
- "Piano Tuner's Dream" (American Suite No. 2) (Perfect 14743/Pathe 36562) 10/22/26
- "Darby Hicks" (American Suite No. 3) (Perfect 14744/Pathe 36563) 10/22/26
- "The Music Of A Mountain Stream" (American Suite No. 4) (Perfect 14755/Pathe 36574) 11/22/26
- "Tampico" (American Suite No. 5) (Perfect 14755/Pathe 36574) 11/22/26
- "Mobile Mud" (American Suite No. 6) (Perfect 14756/Pathe 36575) 10/22/26
- "Deep River" (American Suite No. 7) (Perfect 14774/Pathe 36593) 11/22/26
- "Harlem Blues" (American Suite No. 8) (Perfect 14821/Pathe 36640) 4/20/27

He recorded for Perfect Records and Pathé Records from 1926 to 1928. Between 1928 and 1930, he recorded for Columbia, Harmony (and associated Diva and Velvet Tone labels) and Victor. He also recorded a session in 1937 for Master Records.

Jack Teagarden recorded a critically praised album of Robison's songs in 1962 entitled Think Well of Me. Robison died in Peekskill, New York in 1968, aged 73.

== List of notable compositions ==
- "'Round My Old Deserted Farm"
- "'Tain't So, Honey, 'Tain't So"
- "Jubilee"
- "A Cottage for Sale"
- "Don't Smoke in Bed"
- "Down to Steamboat, Tennessee"
- "Guess I'll Go Back Home (This Summer)"
- "Harlem Lullaby"
- "I'm a Fool About My Mama"
- "In A Little Waterfront Cafe"
- "Barrel-House Music"
- "It's Never Too Late to Pray"
- "Old Folks"
- "The Devil is Afraid of Music"
- "Deep Elm (You Tell 'Em I'm Blue)"
- "(Like a Bird That's On The Wing) I'm Wingin' Home"
- "Peaceful Valley"
- "Dem Deming Blues" ("The Sandstorm Division is Coming") (1918) OCLC 10186775
