= Dave Van Ronk and the Hudson Dusters =

Studio album by Dave Van Ronk
- Released: 1967
- Genre: Rock
- Label: Verve Forecast
- Producer: Barry Kornfeld, Jerry Schoenbaum

Dave Van Ronk chronology
No Dirty Names (1966)	Dave Van Ronk and the Hudson Dusters (1967)	Van Ronk (1971)

Dave Van Ronk and the Hudson Dusters is a 1967 album featuring Dave Van Ronk.

== Van Ronk on the album ==
"The six Dusters cuts on this disc make me think that we were probably too eclectic for the market we were courting, and that a thinking man's rock and roll is a bit like a white blackbird. Even so, I think they represent one of the high points of my recording career. They are: "Alley Oop" - by The Hollywood Argyles out of W. C. Fields, through Frank Zappa. "Chelsea Morning" - Joni Mitchell. I may have been the first New Yorker to fall in love with her. She was still living in Detroit when we met. "Clouds" - Joni didn't like my tampering with her title for this one. She insisted (justifiably) that the original title (Both Sides Now) be included. Still, though, she did entitle her next album "Clouds." :Swing on a Star" -I learned from Bing Crosby in Going My Way, but it never occurred to me to perform it until I saw Luke Faust do his Buster Keatonish reading. "Dink's Song" - probably the best piece of singing as such I've ever done on record. I had a nasty flu when we cut this one, and my voice had gone pre-laryngitic. This had the effect of opening up an octave valve I didn't even know I had. The next day I couldn't talk, let alone sing. "Romping Through the Swamp" - by Peter Stampfel. Peter once told me that my version of this had a bit more dignity than his, and, God help us, I think he's right." --

== Reception ==
Professional ratings
Review scores
Source	Rating
Allmusic	4/5 stars

Writing for Allmusic, music critic Richard Meyer wrote that "Dave Van Ronk always brings his enthusiastic roar to his material and makes it his own. His rendition of "Swing on a Star" is but one example. The Hudson Dusters seem to be a combination electric jugband, folk orchestra and bubblegum band, as on "Mr. Middle." A strange collection."

== Track listing ==
=== Side one ===
1. "Alley Oop" (Dallas Frazier) – 3:38
2. "Head Inspector" (Van Ronk) – 2:06
3. "Swing on a Star" (Johnny Burke, Jimmy Van Heusen) – 2:37
4. "Mr. Middle" (Stephen Bogardus, Dave Woods) – 3:02
5. "Chelsea Morning" (Joni Mitchell) – 2:33
6. "Clouds (From Both Sides Now)" (Joni Mitchell) – 4:37

=== Side two ===
1. "Keep Off the Grass" (Dave Woods, Doris Woods) – 2:08
2. "Dink's Song" (Bess B. Lomax, John A. Lomax) – 3:34
3. "New Dreams" (Dave Woods, Doris Woods) – 2:22
4. "Cocaine" (Reverend Gary Davis) – 4:58
5. "Romping Through the Swamp" (Peter Stampfel) – 1:58

== Personnel ==
- Dave Van Ronk - guitar, vocals
- Dave Woods - electric guitar
- Phillip Namenworth (aka Pot) - keyboards
- Ed Gregory - electric bass
- Rick Henderson - drums

== Production notes ==
- Produced by Barry Kornfeld
- Production Supervisor Jerry Schoenbaum
- All songs arranged by David Woods except "Head Inspector" by Dave Van Ronk
- Director of Engineering: Val Valentin
- Cover Photo: Harry Schwartz
- Liner Photo: Chuck Stewart
- Cover Design: David Krieger
