= Two Sides of Dave Van Ronk =

Compilation album by Dave Van Ronk
- Released: 2002
- Recorded: July 11, 1963–March 10, 1981
- Genre: Folk
- Label: Fantasy
- Producer: Paul Rothchild (reissue producer)

Dave Van Ronk chronology
Sweet & Lowdown (2001)	Two Sides of Dave Van Ronk (2002)	...and the tin pan bended and the story ended... (2004)

Two Sides of Dave Van Ronk is a compilation album by American folksinger Dave Van Ronk, released in 2002. It includes the complete 1963 LP, In the Tradition and all of 1982’s Your Basic Dave Van Ronk except for "In the Midnight Hour" and "Stagolee".

== Reception ==
Professional ratings
Review scores
Source	Rating
Allmusic	3/5 stars
The Penguin Guide to Blues Recordings	2/4 stars

Writing for Allmusic, critic Richie Unterberger wrote of the album " Van Ronk's powers as an excellent folk-blues interpreter were fully intact, and it did include two original Van Ronk compositions in "Sunday Street" and "Gaslight Rag," the latter an homage to the famed Gaslight club in Greenwich Village."

== Track listing ==
1. "Cake Walkin' Babies From Home" (Smith, Troy, Williams) – 2:59
2. "Ace in the Hole" (Dempsey, Mitchell) – 2:53
3. "St. Louis Tickle" (Barney, Seymour) – 3:25
4. "Death Letter Blues" (Traditional) – 4:48
5. "All Over You" (Bob Dylan) – 3:33
6. "Whoa Back Buck" (Huddie Ledbetter, Alan Lomax) – 3:39
7. "Sister Kate" (Piron) – 3:04
8. "Kansas City Blues" (Jackson) – 2:10
9. "Green, Green Rocky Road" (Chandler, Kaufman) – 3:39
10. "See See Rider" (Rainey) – 5:18
11. "Rocks and Gravel" (Traditional) – 4:27
12. "Hesitation Blues" (Traditional) – 3:32
13. "God Bless the Child" (Herzog, Holiday) – 4:25
14. "Sunday Street" (Van Ronk) – 3:20
15. "Sportin' Life" (Brownie McGhee) – 4:56
16. "Cocaine" (Reverend Gary Davis) – 4:30
17. "St. James Infirmary" (Primrose, Traditional) – 5:00
18. "You've Been a Good Ole Wagon" (Henry) – 2:52
19. "Spike Driver Blues" (Hurt) – 4:15
20. "Gaslight Rag" (Van Ronk) – 2:13
21. "Candy Man" (Davis) – 3:04

== Personnel ==
- Dave Van Ronk - vocals, guitar
