= The Mayor of MacDougal Street =

Compilation album by Dave Van Ronk
- Released: April 19, 2005
- Recorded: 1957–1969
- Genre: Folk
- Label: Rootstock Recordings
- Producer: Elijah Wald

Dave Van Ronk chronology
...and the tin pan bended and the story ended... (2004)	The Mayor of MacDougal Street (2005)

The Mayor of MacDougal Street: Rarities 1957-1969 is a compilation album by American folksinger Dave Van Ronk, released in 2005.

== History ==
The Mayor of MacDougal Street contains previously unreleased songs and is presented in chronological order. It contains both solo material and songs recorded with session musicians and bands that either backed Van Ronk or he was a member of. It was included with the memoir of the same title before being released as a separate CD. The title refers to MacDougal Street in Greenwich Village.

== Reception ==
Professional ratings
Review scores
Source	Rating
Allmusic	3.5/5 stars

Writing for Allmusic, critic Steve Leggett wrote of the album "Van Ronk was never a part of the tradition-at-all-costs wing of the folk movement, and he readily embraced the young songwriters of the day, frequently covering their songs, as evidenced by the hushed, nuanced version of Leonard Cohen's "Bird on the Wire" that is included here. A skilled raconteur, Van Ronk had the timing of a jazz hornman, and that timing and his wide-ranging musical interests are everywhere apparent on this lovingly assembled look behind the curtains."

== Track listing ==
1. "New Orleans Hop Scop Blues" (Thomas) – 2:08
2. "On Top of Old Smoky" (Traditional) – 3:31
3. "All My Trials" (Traditional) – 3:48
4. "Buddy Bolden's Blues" (Morton) – 2:48
5. "The Butcher Boy" (Traditional) – 2:56
6. "Salty Dog" (Jackson) – 3:21
7. "Two Trains Running" (Muddy Waters) – 3:34
8. "Way Down in Lubyanka Prison" (Berkeley) – 4:00
9. "Willie the Weeper" (Traditional) – 3:07
10. "Shaving Cream" (Bell) – 3:11
11. "The Cruel Ship's Captain" (Traditional) – 2:39
12. "As You Make Your Bed" (Bertolt Brecht, Kurt Weill) – 4:21
13. "Bird on the Wire" (Leonard Cohen) – 3:29
14. "Both Sides Now" (Joni Mitchell) – 5:14
15. "In Conditional Support of Beauty" (Van Ronk) – 4:00
16. "W.C. Fields Routine [Spoken]" (Traditional) – 1:36
17. "Romping Through the Swamp" (live) (Stampfel) – 2:03

== Personnel ==
- Dave Van Ronk - vocals, guitar

== Production notes ==
- Produced by Elijah Wald
- Mastered by Geoff Brumbaugh
- Editing and pre-mastering by Mark Greenberg
- Compilation and annotation by Elijah Wald
- Digital transfers by Dave Palmater
- Executive producers - Nick Fritsch and Stephen McArthur
- Graphic design by Nick Fritsch
