= Just Dave Van Ronk =

Studio album by Dave Van Ronk
- Released: 1964
- Recorded: 1964
- Studios: Van Gelder Studio, Englewood Cliffs, NJ
- Genre: Folk
- Length: 34:31
- Label: Mercury
- Producer: Frank Fried

Dave Van Ronk chronology
Inside Dave Van Ronk (1964)	Just Dave Van Ronk (1964)	No Dirty Names (1966)

Just Dave Van Ronk is a 1964 album by folk/blues singer Dave Van Ronk. It has not been released on CD.

== History ==
It is probably this arrangement of "House Of The Risin' Sun" that was developed by Dave Van Ronk that Bob Dylan — who was a close friend of Van Ronk's at the time — used on his 1962 debut album Bob Dylan. Van Ronk discusses this in Martin Scorsese's documentary No Direction Home. In the interview, Van Ronk said that he was intending to record it at that time, and that Dylan copied his version of the song.

== Reception ==
Professional ratings
Review scores
Source	Rating
Allmusic	4/5 stars

Writing for Allmusic, music critic Richard Meyer wrote "... Van Ronk's understated guitar style is perfect for these intimate performances. His naturally rough voice allows him to sing these songs believably without any ethnic affectation or false energy."

== Track listing ==
1. "Candy Man" (Gary Davis) – 2:29
2. "Frankie's Blues" (Traditional; arranged by Dave Van Ronk) – 4:36
3. "Bad Dream Blues", (Dave Van Ronk) – 4:57
4. "Pastures of Plenty" (Woody Guthrie) – 3:25
5. "'Didn't it Rain" (Traditional) – 3:00
6. "Wanderin'" (Sammy Kaye) – 2:33
7. "God Bless the Child" (Billie Holiday, Arthur Herzog Jr.) – 4:22
8. "Blue Monday" (Fats Domino, Dave Bartholomew) – 1:59
9. "Baby, Let Me Lay It on You" (Reverend Gary Davis) – 1:35
10. "The House of the Rising Sun" (Arranged by Dave Van Ronk) – 5:35

== Personnel ==
- Dave Van Ronk – vocals, acoustic guitar

== Production notes ==
- Frank Fried – producer
- Rudy Van Gelder – engineer
