= Inside Dave Van Ronk (compilation) =

- 1989 CD cover

Compilation album by Dave Van Ronk
- Released: 1989
- Recorded: April 1962
- Genre: Folk
- Length: 75:46
- Label: Fantasy

Dave Van Ronk chronology
Hesitation Blues (1988)	Inside Dave Van Ronk (1989)	Let No One Deceive You (1990)

Inside Dave Van Ronk is a compilation album by American folk and blues singer Dave Van Ronk, originally released in 1972 on a double LP called Van Ronk. It has subsequently been reissued on CD, the first reissue in 1989.

The songs in the compilation consist of the 1960s Prestige albums Dave Van Ronk, Folksinger and Inside Dave Van Ronk in their entirety.

== Reception ==
Professional ratings
Review scores
Source	Rating
Allmusic	4.5/5 stars

Writing for Allmusic, critic Richie Unterberger wrote of the album "... this is certainly Van Ronk's most enduring work, and indeed one of the few relics of the early-'60s traditional folk boom that holds up well today... One of the few white folkies who could sing acoustic blues without embarrassment, Van Ronk was also an accomplished acoustic guitar picker; instrumentally and vocally, he brought an intensity to his covers that made the songs his own."

== Track listing ==
Songs from Dave Van Ronk, Folksinger

1. "Samson and Delilah" (Traditional) – 2:35
2. "Cocaine Blues" (Luke Jordan) – 4:16
3. "You've Been a Good Old Wagon" (Henry) – 2:19
4. "Fixin' to Die" (White) – 2:52
5. "Hang Me, Oh Hang Me" (Traditional) – 3:07
6. "Long John" (Traditional) – 2:08
7. "Chicken Is Nice" (Traditional) – 2:30
8. "He Was a Friend of Mine" (Traditional) – 3:29
9. "Motherless Children" (Traditional) – 3:48
10. "Stackerlee" (Traditional) – 3:35
11. "Mr. Noah" (Traditional) – 1:26
12. "Come Back Baby" (Davis) – 3:49
13. "Poor Lazarus" (Traditional) – 5:08
  Songs from the original Inside Dave Van Ronk
14. "House Carpenter" (Traditional) – 3:30
15. "The Cruel Ship's Captain" (Traditional) – 1:55
16. "Sprig Of Thyme" (Traditional) – 2:35
17. "Talking Cancer Blues" (Rhodes) – 1:45
18. "I Buyed Me A Little Dog" (Traditional) – 3:59
19. "Lady Gay" (Traditional) – 3:40
20. "Fair And Tender Ladies" (Traditional) – 5:40
21. "Brian O'Lynne" (Traditional) – 1:15
22. "Shanty Man's Life" (Traditional) – 3:20
23. "Silver Dagger" (Traditional) – 2:20
24. "Kentucky Moonshiner" (Traditional) – 2:35
25. "He Never Came Back" (Traditional) – 2:10

== Personnel ==
- Dave Van Ronk – vocals, guitar
