= Sweet & Lowdown =

Studio album by Dave Van Ronk
- Released: June 26, 2001
- Recorded: January 15–24, 2001
- Genre: Folk
- Label: Justin Time
- Producer: Dave Van Ronk, Keith Ingham

Dave Van Ronk chronology
Live at Sir George Williams University (1997)	Sweet & Lowdown (2001)	Two Sides of Dave Van Ronk (2002)

Sweet & Lowdown is an album by folk musician and singer Dave Van Ronk, released in 2001. It was the last studio album released in his lifetime. In this album, Van Ronk returns to recording pop and jazz standards.

== Reception ==
Professional ratings
Review scores
Source	Rating
Allmusic	4/5 stars

Writing for Allmusic, critic Travis Dageset wrote of the album "The tunes swing along with Van Ronk's mildly Louis Armstrong-flavored rasp, which holds up throughout... for the most part, this is indispensable Van Ronk, whose forte, apart from his gift for songwriting, has always been classic interpretation that contains as much of his own distinct personality as it does respect for whatever form of American music he is delving into."

== Track listing ==
1. "I'll See You in My Dreams" (Isham Jones, Gus Kahn) – 2:44
2. "Comes Love" (Brown, Stept, Tobias) – 3:44
3. "Zoot Suit" (Gilbert, O'Brien) – 3:41
4. "As Time Goes By" (Herman Hupfeld) – 5:08
5. "Some of These Days" (Brooks) – 4:00
6. "Thanks for the Memory" (Ralph Rainger, Leo Robin) – 6:00
7. "Puttin' on the Ritz" (Irving Berlin) – 2:49
8. "Blues in the News" (Ingham) – 2:56
9. "I'd Rather Charleston" (Carter, Gershwin) – 3:18
10. "I Can't Get Started" (Duke, Gershwin) – 6:29
11. "Sweet and Low Down" (George Gershwin, Ira Gershwin) – 3:37
12. "I Wonder Where Our Love Has Gone" (Johnson) – 5:17
13. "Your Feet's Too Big" (Benson, Fisher) – 3:33
14. "Bye Bye Blackbird" (Mort Dixon, Ray Henderson) – 4:05
15. "A Cottage for Sale" (Conley, Robison) – :29

== Personnel ==
- Dave Van Ronk – vocals, guitar
- Frank Christian – guitar
- Vince Giordano – banjo, saxophone
- Keith Ingham – piano
- Jon-Erik Kellso – trumpet
- Arnie Kinsella – drums
- Sarah Partridge – background vocals
- Scott Robinson – clarinet, tenor and alto saxophone
- Andrea Vuocolo – background vocals
- Murray Wall – double bass

== Production notes ==
- Produced by Dave Van Ronk and Keith Ingham
- Engineered by Arthur Steuer
- Mastered by Renée Marc-Aurèle and Ian Terry
- Photography by Jack Vartoogian
- Graphic design by Reid Morris
- Production assistant and assistant producer – Jean-Pierre Leduc
- Executive producer – Jim West
