= Pilgrim Travelers =

American gospel group

The Pilgrim Travelers
- Origin: Houston, Texas, United States
- Genres: Gospel, Christian music
- Years active: 1936–1956, 1956–present
- Members: James Wafer; Bill Bufkin; Lawrence Hambrick; Bill White; Ben Peters
- Past members: Keith Barber; Kylo Turner; Jesse Whitaker; J.W. Alexander; George McCurn; Lou Rawls; Raphael Taylor; Willie Davis; Joe Johnson; Lonnie Hill; Dempsey Evans; Henry Bottes; Ernest Booker

The Pilgrim Travelers were an American gospel group, popular in the late 1940s and early 1950s.

== Musical career ==
Formed in 1936 in Houston, Texas, United States, they achieved popularity after moving to Los Angeles in 1942, where their new manager, J. W. Alexander, helped the Travelers develop a vocal style that went beyond imitating the Soul Stirrers and the Golden Gate Quartet, the other reigning quartet of the era. The Pilgrim Travelers traded the lead between their two singers, Kylo Turner, who had the same facility as a note-bending falsetto as R.H. Harris of the Soul Stirrers, and Keith Barber, who changed from being a sweet-voiced tenor to a hard gospel shouter. They added Jesse Whitaker — whom Ray Charles credited as one of his models when he adapted hard gospel style to secular themes to create soul music in the 1950s — as a baritone in 1947.

Alexander also changed the Travelers' performance style from the "flat-footed" style of early quartets to the church-wrecking style of other groups of their era. The singers would punctuate their singing by jumping off stage and running up the aisles in order, in Alexander's words, "to pull the sisters out of their seats".

The Travelers began recording their material with a microphone picking up the sound of their percussive foot-tapping; Specialty's early press for the group proclaimed "Something New — Walking Rhythm Spirituals," and the unique sound quickly caught on with female gospel fans. In 1948, the group issued six singles, followed by three the next year. In 1950, Specialty released ten Pilgrim Travelers sides, all of them garnering strong sales (particularly "Jesus Met the Woman at the Well" and "Mother Bowed").

The Plgrim Travelers gradually fell apart in the 1950s, however, as accidents and drinking caused both Barber and Turner to leave the group. While the group continued to tour and record, adding Lou Rawls in the 1950s, it lost its hit-making power after leaving Specialty Records in 1956. The group disbanded in 1956. Rawls left the group; although he returned to record another album with the group after that, it soon faded from the scene. James Wafer formed new Pilgrim Travelers in 1956.

== See also ==
- Dixie Hummingbirds
