= To All My Friends in Far-Flung Places =

Studio album by Dave Van Ronk
- Released: 1994
- Recorded: June 1993–August 1994
- Genre: Folk
- Length: 95:27
- Label: Gazell
- Producer: Sam Charters

Dave Van Ronk chronology
A Chrestomathy (1992)	To All My Friends in Far-Flung Places (1994)	From... Another Time & Place (1995)

To All My Friends in Far-Flung Places is a 1994 album by the American musician Dave Van Ronk. He performed versions of songs written by people he knew. Van Ronk spent 18 months working on the album. Christine Lavin sang on To All My Friends in Far-Flung Places.

== Reception ==
Professional ratings
Review scores
Source	Rating
AllMusic	4/5 stars
Robert Christgau	(neither)

Writing for AllMusic, critic Bruce Eder praised the album and wrote: "Van Ronk does remarkably well with this material—he holds a tune less effectively than Dylan, but he also imparts a special rawness and seriousness to the songs, his voice overflowing with the sound of seemingly bitter experience... Not all of it works — his voice is sometimes way too rough even by folk-blues standards for what he's trying to do — but most of it is extremely valuable. And his cover of 'Soon My Work Will All Be Done' is one of Van Ronk's greatest performances ever."

== Track listing ==
Disc one

1. "Subterranean Homesick Blues" (Bob Dylan)
2. "Where Were You Last Night" (Frank Christian)
3. "Simon Smith and the Amazing Dancing Bear" (Randy Newman)
4. "Ramblin' Boy" (Tom Paxton)
5. "My Name Joe" (David Massengill)
6. "Outside of a Small Circle of Friends" (Phil Ochs)
7. "Entering Marion" (John Forster)
8. "The Drinking Song" (Jack Hardy)
9. "Amoeba Hop" (Christine Lavin)
10. "Things " (Mitch Greenhill)
11. "Stone Sober Blues" (Paul Geremia)
12. "Joshua Gone Barbados" (Eric Von Schmidt)
13. "Soon My Work Will Be All Done" (Reverend Gary Davis)
14. "To All My Friends in Far Flung Places" (Jane Voss)

Disc two

1. "Wrap the World Around Your Finger" (Judy Mayhan)
2. "Jersey Girl" (Tom Waits)
3. "Punky's Dilema" (Paul Simon)
4. "I'm Hip" (Dave Frishberg, Bob Dorough)
5. "Harbour of Love" (Erik Frandsen, Michael Garin, Robert Hipkens, Paula Lockhart)
6. "Awful Kind of Blues" (Gary White, John F. Hammond)
7. "Why the Blues Don't Worry Me" (Steve James)
8. "A Sailor's Prayer" (Rod MacDonald)
9. "Many a Mile" (Patrick Sky)
10. "Four Strong Winds" (Ian Tyson)
11. "The Simple Things We Said" (Les Choses Les Plus Simple)" (Gabriel Yacoub) (English Translation: Ellen Hinsey, Nikki Matheson, Gabriel Yacoub)
12. "Song to a Seagull" (Joni Mitchell)
13. "Heart on the Run" (Tom Intondi, Frank Rossini)
14. "All My Friends in Far Flung Places (Reprise)" (Jane Voss)

== Personnel ==
- Dave Van Ronk – vocals, guitar
- Samuel Charters – background vocals, washboard, jug
- Frank Christian – guitar, vocals
- Dave Conrad – bass
- Anne DeMarinis – accordion
- Ada Dyer – background vocals
- Bill Ferns – harmonica
- Erik Frandsen – guitar, background vocals
- Paul Geremia – guitar
- Dakota Dave Hull – guitar
- Keith Ingham – piano, organ
- Arnie Kinsella – drums
- Christine Lavin – background vocals
- Chris Lowe – background vocals
- Peri Lyons – background vocals
- David Massengill – background vocals
- Tom Paxton – background vocals
- Britt Savage – background vocals
- Jenny Schuessler – background vocals
- Eve Silber – background vocals
- Shelly Thompson – background vocals
- Andrea Vuocolo – background vocals
- Murray Wall – bass
- Heather Wood – background vocals

Production

- Produced by Samuel Charters
- Engineered by Arthur Steuer and Steve Rosenthal
- Photography by Samuel Charters and Nora Charters
