= The Unfortunate Rake =

Anglo-American folk song, also called "The Unfortunate Lad"

"The Unfortunate Rake" is a ballad (Roud 2, Laws Q26), which through the folk process has evolved into a large number of variants, including allegedly the country and western song "Streets of Laredo".

The Roud Broadside Index contains exactly two songs with the title "The Unfortunate Rake": "Jenny Gordon or The Unfortunate Rake" from the Madden collection, and another printed in Gateshead, England, whose first line is "Attend to the tale of a wand’rer forlorn". These do not seem to be connected with the songs that came to be seen as part of an "Unfortunate Rake" cycle. There are also several tunes named "The Unfortunate Rake".

== Synopsis ==
In nineteenth-century broadside versions, the narrator meets a comrade outside a hospital for sexually transmitted diseases, known as a lock hospital. The comrade is wrapped up in flannel. When asked why, he replies that it is because his body is injured, 'disordered'. He has received this 'injury' from a woman, referred to as "my own heart's delight". She failed to warn him when she "disordered" him, so he was unable to obtain the medication that would have saved him ("salts and the pills of white mercury", an obsolete treatment for syphilis). As a result he is dying, "cut down in his prime". He had ignored his father’s frequent rebukes and warnings about his wicked ways. He asks the narrator to arrange his funeral. He requests that his coffin be carried by six "jolly fellows", his "pall" by six "pretty maidens". They should carry "bunches of roses" to cover the smell of the corpse. His coffin should be strewn with roses and lavender. He further instructs that they should "muffle their drums" but "play their pipes merrily", specifying the "dead march" as music, and asking for "guns" to be fired "right over my coffin".

== Title and origins ==
The term "The Unfortunate Rake" is sometimes used as a generic name for types of variant, or for all variants, irrespective of the titles and/or the lyrics of the source material. For example, writing in the United States, Lodewick (1955), referring to a group of early variants that involve a soldier and a camp follower, as opposed to a group of versions that involve a prostitute, writes, "For identification, I shall call this by its most popular title, 'The Unfortunate Rake'. A follow-up piece by Goldstein (1959) in the same journal refers to "The Rake Cycle".

The variant or variants on which these writers base their use of the title "The Unfortunate Rake" are not cited. Early twentieth century British references to this title are references to a tune, not to song lyrics, with the idea that the tune may have originally been used for a song called "The Unfortunate Lad" being offered as a conjecture.

According to Bishop and Roud (2014), the earliest-known variant, a late eighteenth-century or early nineteenth-century broadside in the Madden Collection, is called "The Buck's Elegy". This is the lament of a young man about town, set in Covent Garden, a well-known haunt of London prostitutes. The moribund young man bewails the fact that he did not know what was wrong with him in time, in which case he could have taken mercury to treat the ailment, and he makes requests about his funeral. This version includes what Bishop and Roud refer to as "explicit clues" that the persona has a sexually transmitted disease, likely advanced syphilis, in the form of references to mercury and other treatments for that disease.

Bishop and Roud state: "Despite the number and variety of collected versions, the early history of the song is still unclear, and surprisingly few nineteenth-century broadside copies have survived." They state that the song probably dates from 1740 or earlier, but that "at present we have no evidence to support such a theory". Some versions, they explain, provide clues to a sexually transmitted disease as the cause of the persona's woes; others "manage to avoid or disguise this element". They also comment that many versions incorporate a "military-style" funeral, with pipes, drums, and rifles. They describe it as "one of the most versatile songs in the Anglo-American tradition, as it seems able to adapt itself to any group or situation."

A nineteenth-century broadside published by the printer Such of London is referred to in some twentieth-century literature on the song. This version, and several others of that time, is called "The Unfortunate Lad". The first line of this song is "As I was a walking down by the Lock Hospital." This term, which referred to a hospital for the treatment of sexually transmitted diseases, is another item referred to by Bishop and Roud as an "explicit hint". Several digitised images of broadside version of this song may be found online.

In 1911, Phillips Barry, who had studied folklore at Harvard, published an article claiming that the origins of "The Unfortunate Lad", which he incorrectly termed ‘The Unfortunate Rake’, were to be found in a fragment called "My Jewel, My Joy". His argument was based on a one-verse fragment provided with a tune of the same name. This had been collected by William Forde in Cork and published in 1909 by P W Joyce. The single verse is as follows:

My jewel, my joy, don't trouble me with the drum,
Play the dead march as my corpse goes along;
And over my body throw handfuls of laurel,
And let them all know that I'm going to my rest.

The many variants feature various young soldiers, sailors, maids, and cowboys, being "cut down in their prime" and contemplating their deaths.

It has been claimed that a similar story set to a different tune become the standard "St. James Infirmary Blues". This claim has been disputed on various grounds. Kenneth Lodewick commented: "No folk connection has been shown, but the composer of the hit tune apparently knew the tradition – and used it."

In the 2018 Katharine Briggs Memorial Lecture, Professor Richard Jenkins discusses several aspects of what he calls the "folkloristic narrative" relating to these songs. He asserts that several aspects of this narrative may be shown to be "dubious, if not incorrect", and suggests that the way in which a "misleading tale" became accepted as "conventional knowledge" has implications for those engaged in the study of folklore.

== Variants ==
Lists of variants appear both online and in the literature on the song. One source of documentation is the Vaughan Williams Memorial Library at the English Folk Dance and Song Society. The Broadside Index and the Folk Song Index are both compiled by Steve Roud and are searchable online.

=== Tunes ===
English folk song collectors in the early twentieth century found different tunes being used for variants, but a number of variants use the same melody, including the sub-family known as "The Cowboy's Lament", of which "Streets of Laredo" is perhaps the best known. This tune is also used for a different song, "The Bard of Armagh".

The nineteenth century broadsheet versions from the British Isles were printed without tunes.

In 1904, it was conjectured that words of the song "The Unfortunate Lad" had originally been sung to an Irish tune called "The Unfortunate Rake", which had been printed with different words, or no words, in two collections of Irish tunes, one by Crosby, the other by Belden. For example, the words provided for the air "The Unfortunate Rake" by Crosby are about a wandering harpist from Connaught, who is seeking pity and hospitality from his listeners.

The melody for a variant called "The Unfortunate Lad", set in Rippleton Gardens, was published in 1904.

Another melody, this one to a variant called "The Young Girl Cut Down in Her Prime", was collected in 1909 and published in 1913. The tune is noted as "mixolydian with dorian influence". In a note to this article, Cecil Sharp reported that he had collected six different tunes for this song, and he published the ones he stated were the "two best tunes - both of the Henry Martin type". The first is labelled "dorian", the second "aeolian/dorian".

In 1915, yet another tune was published in the Journal of the Folk Song Society; this time stated to be similar to one used for rush-cart Morris dancing at Moston, Manchester, England.

In 1918, English folk song collector Cecil Sharp, who was visiting the US, collected a version which used the phrase "St James' Hospital" in Dewey, Virginia. This song was called "The Sailor Cut Down in His Prime". Sharp's field notes were available for researchers, though the song was not published until after Sharp's death, when his collaborator, Maud Karpeles, produced a second volume of songs from the Southern Appalachians.

By 1937, the English Folk Song Society had become the English Folk Dance and Song Society, and in that year, another tune was published, this time to accompany a variant beginning with a reference to "Bath Hospital". The tune is described as "dorian".

In the 1950s a version sung by A L Lloyd and called "The Unfortunate Rake" was released, with Kenneth Goldstein as editor of the LP called "Street Songs of England", and the same version was included on Goldstein's later Folkways LP, "The Unfortunate Rake". Though this version is described on the liner notes as a nineteenth-century broadside version, and is often taken as such in subsequent literature, Lloyd's practice in the past had been to publish "composite" versions of songs, to give what he called "greater continuity or higher dramatic interest". The liner notes to the second LP are often cited as a source of historical information about this song, though their reliability is questionable as they were compiled by Goldstein, who had a business education and was in the business of selling recorded folk music. The version sung, and possibly devised, by Lloyd appears to be the earliest available variant using the title "The Unfortunate Rake" for which there is clear evidence.

These liner notes are the main origin of an often repeated incorrect idea that an early version of the song was collected in Dublin, Ireland. In those notes Goldstein cites an article by Kenneth Lodewick as a source. In that article, Lodewick incorrectly substitutes "Dublin" for "Cork", which is the place of collection given in the source material he cites. That same source material is where A L Lloyd obtained the tune he uses on the LP. It is a collection of Irish tunes gathered by William Forde in Ireland, and published by P W Joyce, of the Royal Society of Antiquaries of Ireland in 1909. The tune in question is called "My Jewel, My Joy", and not "The Unfortunate Rake". Lloyd's rationale for selecting this tune is outlined in the essay cited by Goldstein in the liner notes to the second LP.

None of these versions, with the exception of the 1950s version by A L Lloyd, and the version collected in Virginia, includes a reference to the "St James" hospital or "infirmary", though some refer to a differently named hospital.

== Lyrics ==
In most variants the narrator is a friend or parent who meets the song's dying subject; in other variants the narrator is the one dying.

The 1960 Folkways Records album also titled The Unfortunate Rake features 20 different variations of the ballad. The liner notes of this album claim that A L Lloyd is singing a nineteenth-century broadsheet version, but does not specify which. The notes refer to an article by A L Lloyd. This article explicitly refers to the Such version, and the last two verses are quoted accurately, but despite this, the words sung by Lloyd are not those in the Such broadside.

Variants not in this album include a number of nineteenth-century broadsheet versions, including:

- "The Buck's Elegy"
- "The Unfortunate Lad" – Printed for John Carrots. The digital version was published online by the National Library of Scotland, which dates the version as around 1850. The opening line refers to "The Lock Hospital".
- "The Unfortunate Lad" – Printed by H P Such in London. Several digital version have been published online by the Bodleian, which dates them as being produced between 1863 and 1885. The opening line refers to "The Lock Hospital". This version is similar to the Carrots version, with minor differences.

Other versions include:

- "Only the Heartaches/Only the Hangman is Waiting For Me" – Belonging to the cowboy branch of the family, the narrator contemplates murdering his lover and the consequences of such an act; recorded by Rex Allen.
- "Young Girl Cut Down in Her Prime".
- "When I Was on Horseback" – Recorded by Steeleye Span.
- "Dyin' Crapshooter's Blues" – This song bears a few similarities to the more famous "St. James Infirmary Blues". Similarly chronicling an amoral life gone wrong, this song's most famous interpretation was done by Blind Willie McTell, but is based around the life of gambler Jesse Williams. McTell sings of a cold hearted gambler, who becomes distressed about a relationship with "Sweet Lorene", he comes into conflict with the police, and is shot down. Like in "St. James Infirmary Blues", Williams wants "six crapshooters to be my pallbearers". Lyrical similarities signify that the song shares "The Unfortunate Rake" with "St. James Infirmary Blues" as a common ancestor.

A later song that draws on elements from the ballad is the Eric Bogle song "No Man's Land".

A version of the song, renamed to "A Young Trooper Cut Down", was recorded on the 2016 Harp and a Monkey album War Stories. This version tells of the song being used as First World War military propaganda warning soldiers of the dangers of syphilis.

In 2018 the song was prominently featured in "The Mortal Remains," the final episode of the Coen Brothers The Ballad of Buster Scruggs under the title "The Unfortunate Lad." The song was performed a capella by the actor Brendan Gleeson.
