= Dave Van Ronk in Rome =

Live album by Dave Van Ronk
- Released: 1983
- Genre: Folk
- Label: Folkstudio

Dave Van Ronk chronology
St. James Infirmary (1982)	Dave Van Ronk in Rome (1983)	Going Back to Brooklyn (1985)

Dave Van Ronk in Rome is a live album by Dave Van Ronk, released in 1983. It was released on the Italian label Folkstudio.

The Dave Van Ronk discography states it was re-issued as From... Another Time & Place. The track list is the same.

== Track listing ==
=== Side one ===
1. "Kansas City Blues" (Traditional)
2. "Down South Blues" (Traditional)
3. "Bad Dream Blues" (Van Ronk)
4. "Losers" (Van Ronk)
5. "Long John" (Traditional)
6. "He Was a Friend of Mine" (Bob Dylan)

=== Side two ===
1. "Another Time & Place" (Van Ronk)
2. "Lovin' Spoonful" (Davis)
3. "Hoochie Coochie Man" (Willie Dixon)
4. "The Old Man" (Dylan)
5. "Frankie's Blues" (Van Ronk)
6. "Honey Hair" (Van Ronk)

== Personnel ==
- Dave Van Ronk – vocals, guitar
