= Songs for Ageing Children =

Studio album by Dave Van Ronk
- Released: 1973
- Studio: Advantage Sound, New York
- Genre: Folk
- Length: 35:10
- Label: Cadet; CA-50044
- Producer: Michael Brovsky

Dave Van Ronk chronology
Van Ronk (1971)	Songs for Ageing Children (1973)	Sunday Street (1976)

Songs for Ageing Children (sub-titled Let the Feeling Talk to You) is an album by American folk and blues performer Dave Van Ronk, released in 1973. The album has not been released on CD, but a needle drop of the album has appeared on digital download platforms such as YouTube and iTunes.

== Reception ==
Professional ratings
Review scores
Source	Rating
Allmusic	3.5/5 stars

Allmusic stated in their review "This is a varied set, as if Van Ronk were trying to cover a lot of bases against the chance that he might not get another opportunity to record again soon."

== Track listing ==
=== Side one ===
1. "Duncan & Brady" (Traditional; arranged by Dave Van Ronk) – 3:48
2. "Green Rocky Road" (Len Chandler) – 4:08
3. "As You Make Your Bed" (Bertolt Brecht, Kurt Weill) – 4:21
4. "Teddy Bears' Picnic" ( John Walter Bratton, Jimmy Kennedy) – 2:22
5. "Song for Joni" (Dave Van Ronk) – 2:02

=== Side two ===
1. "Work with Me Annie" (Hank Ballard) – 2:30
2. "River" (Joni Mitchell) – 2:45
3. "My Little Grass Shack in Kealakekua, Hawaii" (Bill Cogswell, Tommy Harrison, Johnny Noble) – 3:35
4. "Sail Away" (Randy Newman) – 2:54
5. "Candy Man" (Rev. Gary Davis) – 2:43
6. "Last Call" (Van Ronk) – 3:07

== Personnel ==
Produced by Michael Brovsky for GRT Corporation. A Free Flow Production in association with Dave Van Ronk

- Arrangements – Dave Van Ronk & Barry Kornfeld
- Engineer – Martin Nyles Lennard
- Recorded & Remixed at Advantage Studios, New York
- Album Graphics & Design – Jon Shaheen-Yellow Studio
- Woodcut – Luke Faust
