= Sunday Street (album) =

- The original LP album cover.

Studio album by Dave Van Ronk
- Released: 1976
- Genre: Folk
- Length: 43:16
- Label: Philo
- Producer: Dave Van Ronk

Dave Van Ronk chronology
| Songs for Ageing Children (1973) | Sunday Street (1976) | Somebody Else, Not Me (1980) |

Alternative Cover
- Cover of the 1999 CD reissue of Sunday Street.

Sunday Street is an album by American folk and blues singer Dave Van Ronk, released in 1976.

== History ==
Sunday Street is Van Ronk and his guitar only. He takes on some ragtime with favorites such as The Pearls and Maple Leaf Rag as well as a return to more traditional folk and blues.

Sunday Street was re-released on CD in 1999.

== Reception ==
Professional ratings
Review scores
| Source | Rating |
|---|---|
| Allmusic | 4.5/5 stars |
| The Penguin Guide to Blues Recordings | 2.5/4 stars |

Allmusic stated in their review "Van Ronk never hid his influences, but he never sounded exactly like them, either, and on this album he was very much himself. Maybe it is his greatest single album; it is certainly one of his most representative."

== Track listing ==
1. "Sunday Street" (Van Ronk) – 3:27
2. "Jesus Met the Woman at the Well" (Traditional) – 5:34
3. "Nobody Knows the Way I Feel This Morning" (Traditional) – 3:51
4. "Maple Leaf Rag" (Scott Joplin) – 3:59
5. "Down South Blues" (Traditional) – 4:35
6. "Jivin' Man Blues" (Traditional) – 3:03
7. "That Song About the Midway" (Joni Mitchell) – 3:33
8. "The Pearls" (Jelly Roll Morton) – 4:29
9. "That'll Never Happen No More" (Blind Blake) – 3:48
10. "Mamie's Blues" (Traditional) – 4:19
11. "Swinging on a Star" (Johnny Burke, Jimmy Van Heusen) – 2:38

== Personnel ==
- Dave Van Ronk – vocals, guitar
