= Jesus Met the Woman at the Well =

Gospel song

"Jesus Met the Woman at the Well" is a traditional gospel song. It relates the story of the meeting between Jesus and the Samaritan Woman, found in the Gospel of John at 4:4-26.

One of the earliest recordings, by The Pilgrim Travelers (1950), credits the song as "Traditional, arranged by J. W. Alexander". The recording by Nick Cave and the Bad Seeds (1986) credits the song as "Traditional, arranged by The Alabama Singers". (Some sources suggest that The Pilgrim Travelers and The Alabama Singers are alternative names for the same people.) The song has also been attributed to Reverend (Blind) Gary Davis.

== Lyrics ==
As with many traditional songs, the lyrics differ from one performer to another. The following are typical:

Jesus met the woman at the well, (x3)
And He told her everything she'd ever done.

He said, "Woman, woman, where is your husband?" (x3)
"I know everything you've ever done."

She said, "Jesus, Jesus, I ain't got no husband" (x3)
"And You don't know everything I've ever done."

He said, "Woman, woman, you've got five husbands" (x3)
"And the one you have now, he's not your own."

She said, "This man, this man, He must be the prophet" (x3)
"He done told me everything I've ever done."

Jesus met the woman at the well, (x3)
And He told her everything she'd ever done.

== Recordings ==
Several artists have recorded the song. Recordings by people with Wikipedia articles include:

- 1947 – Two Gospel Keys, 78 rpm single for Apollo Records
- 1949 – The Fairfield Four, 78 rpm single
- 1950 – The Pilgrim Travelers, 78 rpm single
- 1954 – Sonny Terry and Blind Gary Davis, on the album The Singing Reverend
- 1955 – Mahalia Jackson, 45 rpm single and on the album The World's Greatest Gospel Singer
- 1958 – Mahalia Jackson, on the album Live at Newport 1958
- 1962 – Reverend Gary Davis, on the album Live at Gerde's Folk City 1962
- 1963 – C. L. Franklin, 45 rpm single Battle Records 6119 (a re-release of J.V.B. Records 106, of unknown date)
- 1964 – Ian & Sylvia, on the album Four Strong Winds
- 1964 – Peter, Paul and Mary, on the album In Concert, allegedly written by group members Peter Yarrow, Milton T. Okun and Mary Allin Travers
- 1969 – Sister Rosetta Tharpe. Included on the compilation albums How Sweet It Was (2010) and Good Feeling (2011)
- 1976 – Dave Van Ronk, on the album Sunday Street
- 1981 – Cleophus Robinson, on the album The Lord Takes Care of Everybody
- 1983 – Dave Van Ronk, on the album St. James Infirmary
- 1986 – Nick Cave and the Bad Seeds, on the album Kicking Against the Pricks
- 2011 – Charlie Parr, on the album Keep Your Hands on the Plow
- 2011 – The Versiteers, on the compilation album Shall We Gather At The River (Song was recorded in 1995 and the album (2011) was a Florida Folklife Collection release)
- 2017 – Bob Dylan, on Trouble No More: The Bootleg Series Vol. 13 / 1979-1981
- 2020 – Sister Thea Bowman, FSPA, in Songs of My People: The Complete Collection, a digital re-release of the recording done in 1988.

== See also ==
- Lift Him Up That's All, a different gospel song which relates to the same Biblical story, first recorded in 1927 by Washington Phillips
- "Jesus Gave Me Water," a Sam Cooke song, recorded with the Soul Stirrers for Specialty Records in 1951, based on the same Biblical story
