= Pastures of Plenty =

Song by Woody Guthrie
- Language: English
- Published: 1941
- Songwriter: Woody Guthrie

"Pastures of Plenty" is a 1941 composition by Woody Guthrie. Describing the travails and dignity of migrant workers in North America, it is evocative of the world described in John Steinbeck's The Grapes of Wrath. The tune is based on the ballad "Pretty Polly", a traditional English-language folk song from the British Isles that was also well known in the Appalachian region of North America; and/or on the tune to Nottamun Town.

"Pastures of Plenty" was also the title of a book about Guthrie by Dave Marsh, including material written by Woody Guthrie, Pastures of Plenty: A Self-Portrait, published in 1990.

The tune may have been borrowed by Bob Dylan for his 1963 song "Masters of War" on the album The Freewheelin' Bob Dylan, even though some say that Dylan borrowed directly from the older song Nottmun Town.

== Recorded versions ==
- Woody Guthrie
- Harry Belafonte
- Bob Dylan
- Peter Tevis (The instrumental version of this song composed by Ennio Morricone was later used as the theme to A Fistful of Dollars)
- Peter, Paul and Mary
- Dave Van Ronk (on Just Dave Van Ronk)
- Ramblin' Jack Elliot
- John McCutcheon
- Alison Krauss & Union Station
- Karl Denver

== Published versions ==
- Rise Up Singing page 55

== Popular culture ==
The phrase is used in a different context in the song "Talking Vietnam Pot-Luck Blues" by Tom Paxton.

The line "we come with the dust and we go with the wind" reappears as "that come with the dust and are gone with the wind" in Bob Dylan's "Song to Woody".
