= From... Another Time & Place =

Studio album by Dave Van Ronk
- Released: Aug 8, 1995
- Genre: Folk
- Length: 38:15
- Label: Alcazar

Dave Van Ronk chronology
To All My Friends in Far-Flung Places (1994)	From... Another Time & Place (1995)	Live at Sir George Williams University (1997)

From... Another Time & Place is an album, released in 1995, by folk singer and guitarist Dave Van Ronk.

The album is described as a new release by Allmusic, but the Dave Van Ronk discography states it is a re-issue of Dave Van Ronk in Rome, which is supported by the identical track list.

Van Ronk received a Grammy nomination for From... Another Time & Place in the Best Traditional Folk Album catgegory at the Grammy Awards of 1996.

== Reception ==
Professional ratings
Review scores
Source	Rating
Allmusic	3/5 stars

Writing for Allmusic, critic William Ruhlman wrote of the album "Always gruff-voiced, Van Ronk in his 60th year has lost nothing and perhaps even gained a more subtle expressiveness."

== Track listing ==
1. "Another Time & Place" (Van Ronk) – 4:15
2. "Lovin' Spoonful" (Davis) – 3:15
3. "(I'm Your) Hoochie Coochie Man" (Willie Dixon) – 3:50
4. "The Old Man" (Bob Dylan) – 1:40
5. "Frankie's Blues" (Van Ronk) – 4:20
6. "Honey Hair" (Van Ronk) – 3:10
7. "Kansas City Blues" (Traditional) – 2:10
8. "Down South Blues" (Traditional) – 3:45
9. "Bad Dream Blues" (Van Ronk) – 3:35
10. "Losers" (Van Ronk) – 2:40
11. "Long John" (Traditional) – 2:05
12. "He Was a Friend of Mine" (Dylan) – 3:30

== Personnel ==
- Dave Van Ronk – vocals, guitar
