= Let No One Deceive You =

Let No One Deceive You: Songs of Bertolt Brecht

Studio album by Dave Van Ronk, Frankie Armstrong
- Released: 1992
- Genre: Folk
- Length: 41:39
- Label: Flying Fish (FF 70557)
- Producer: Gary Cristall

Dave Van Ronk chronology
Inside Dave Van Ronk (1989)	Let No One Deceive You: Songs of Bertolt Brecht (1992)	Hummin' to Myself (1990)

Let No One Deceive You: Songs of Bertolt Brecht (or simply Let No One Deceive You) is an album by American folk and blues singer Dave Van Ronk and vocalist Frankie Armstrong, released in 1992. It consists completely of songs by Bertolt Brecht.

== Reception ==
Professional ratings
Review scores
Source	Rating
Allmusic	3.5/5 stars

Writing for Allmusic, critic William Ruhlman wrote of the album "These are songs that have been translated from the original German many times, and listeners familiar with them will recognize minor variations from, for example, Marc Blitzstein's English adaptations for The Threepenny Opera. It's actually some of the more obscure songs with music by Hanns Eisler... that are more interesting, since, while often recorded, they are rarely performed in English."

== Track listing ==
All songs by Bertolt Brecht and Kurt Weill unless otherwise noted.

1. "Mack the Knife" – 2:30
2. "The Love Market" (Brecht, Hanns Eisler) – 2:40
3. "We All Make the Bed That We Lie In – 3:37
4. "Song Of A German Mother" (Brecht, Eisler) – 3:58
5. "Lullabies I, II, III/To My Countrymen/Lullaby IV" (Brecht, Eisler) – 3:30
6. "A Man Is a Man" (Brecht) – 3:20
7. "The Song of the Little Wind" (Brecht, Eisler) – 2:04
8. "Let No One Deceive You" – 1:56
9. "Song of the Moldau" (Brecht, Eisler) – 1:16
10. "The Legend of the Dead Soldier" (Brecht) – 3:30
11. "Pirate Jenny" – 4:03
12. "Alabama Song" – 5:10
13. "What Keeps a Man Alive?" – 2:47
14. "Tango Ballad" – 4:37

== Personnel ==
- Dave Van Ronk – vocals, guitar
- Frankie Armstrong – vocals
- Paul Blaney – bass
- J. Douglas Dodd – piano
- Eric Frandsen – guitar
- Leon Rosselson – guitar, piano

== Production notes ==
- Produced by Gary Cristall
- Engineered by Simon Garber
- Design by Dugg Simpson
- Liner notes by John Brazier and Elijah Wald
