= Going Back to Brooklyn =

Studio album by Dave Van Ronk
- Released: 1985
- Genre: Folk
- Length: 41:12
- Label: Reckless
- Producer: Dave Van Ronk

Dave Van Ronk chronology
Dave Van Ronk in Rome (1983)	Going Back to Brooklyn (1985)	Hesitation Blues (1988)

Going Back to Brooklyn is an album by American folk and blues singer Dave Van Ronk, released in 1985.

== History ==
Although Van Ronk was primarily an interpretive singer of traditional folk and blues songs along with covers of the songs of others, he still wrote a number of songs over his long career. Going Back to Brooklyn is the only album he made that is devoted entirely to his own compositions. Many of the songs were written, and some recorded, years and even decades previous to this release; however, all of the songs on this release were re-recorded specially for this album.

Going Back to Brooklyn was re-released on CD twice, in 1991 by Gazell Records and in 2006 by Hightone Records.

== Reception ==
Professional ratings
Review scores
Source	Rating
AllMusic	4.5/5 stars
Robert Christgau	

AllMusic's William Ruhlman wrote: "Van Ronk is primarily an interpretive singer with a repertoire of traditional folk-blues songs along with covers of the songs of his peers... Even when he writes a well-developed original, he basically adapts one of his favorite folk-blues fingerpicking patterns to accompany a lyric idea... Van Ronk uses his raspy, expressive voice, which contrasts with the sweetness of his guitar playing, to get across harsh, bitter feelings... Going Back to Brooklyn is unique among Dave Van Ronk albums for the portrait it provides of the artist, even if on the surface it sounds like many of this other records." Music critic Robert Christgau gave the album a one-star honorable mention indicating "a worthy effort consumers attuned to its overriding aesthetic or individual vision may well like" and called Van Ronk "the most steadfast of the folkies—and the funniest."

== Track listing ==
All songs by Dave Van Ronk.

1. "Losers" – 3:14
2. "Blood Red Moon" – 4:06
3. "Honey Hair" – 3:22
4. "Head Inspector" – 2:29
5. "Luang Prabang" – 1:36
6. "Antelope Rag" – 5:21
7. "Tantric Mantra" – 0:39
8. "Gaslight Rag" – 2:06
9. "Last Call" – 2:37
10. "Garden State Stomp" – 3:30
11. "Zen Koans Gonna Rise Again" – 3:42
12. "The Whores of San Pedro" – 0:33
13. "Left Bank Blues" – 3:39
14. "Another Time and Place" – 4:37

== Personnel ==
- Dave Van Ronk – vocals, guitar

=== Production ===
- Design by Johnny Bartlett
- Engineered by Bruce Bartone and Alan Mattes
- Back Cover by Nora Charters
- Photography by John W. Seraphin
- Liner Notes by Rosalie Sorrels
- Photography, Cover Design, Cover Art by Andrea Vuocolo
