= A Chrestomathy =

Compilation album by Dave Van Ronk
- Released: 1992
- Recorded: 1960–1991
- Genre: Folk
- Label: Gazell
- Producer: Dave Van Ronk

Dave Van Ronk chronology
The Folkways Years, 1959–1961 (1991)	A Chrestomathy (1992)	To All My Friends in Far-Flung Places (1994)

A Chrestomathy is a retrospective two-CD compilation of songs by Dave Van Ronk released in 1992. Its liner notes explain the title: "CHRES-TO-MA-THY: a selection of choice passages. WHICH MEANS THIS IS A SELECTION OF CHOICE WORKS FROM MORE THAN THIRTY YEARS OF DAVE'S MUSIC ON RECORDS."

Van Ronk recorded for many record labels. This compilation was released by Gazell Records.

== Reception ==
Professional ratings
Review scores
Source	Rating
Allmusic	4/5 stars

Writing for Allmusic, critic William Ruhlman wrote of the album "his affection for the pop music of his childhood ("Two Sleepy People," sung with Christine Lavin, "Swinging on a Star"), makes for a more varied chrestomathy than those who think of Dave Van Ronk simply as a folksinger might expect. It's hard to summarize more than three decades in the career of a steadily working musician in less than two hours, even one who recorded in as piecemeal a fashion as this one, but this compilation does a good job."

== Track listing ==
=== Disc 1 ===
No.	Title	Writer(s)	Length
1.	"Tell Old Bill"	Traditional	4:24
2.	"Cocaine Blues"	Luke Jordan	4:19
3.	"Motherless Children"	Traditional	3:51
4.	"Poor Lazarus"	Traditional	5:11
5.	"Mr Noah"	Traditional	1:32
6.	"Come Back Baby"	Traditional	3:52
7.	"If I Had to Do It All Over Again"	Bob Dylan	3:34
8.	"Kentucky Moonshiner"	Traditional	2:40
9.	"Fair and Tender Ladies"	Traditional	5:42
10.	"Alley Oop"	Frazier, Kaverin	3:39
11.	"Chelsea Morning"	Joni Mitchell	2:37
12.	"Clouds"	Mitchell	4:38
13.	"Swinging on a Star"	Johnny Burke, Jimmy Van Heusen	2:37
14.	"Dink's Song"	Traditional	3:34
15.	"Romping Through the Swamp"	Stampfel	1:59

- Tracks 10–15 originally on The Hudson Dusters

=== Disc 2 ===
No.	Title	Writer(s)	Length
1.	"My Little Grass Shack"	Cogswell, Harrison, Nobel	3:39
2.	"You's a Viper"		2:35
3.	"Temptation Rag"	Lodge	3:10
4.	"Stealin'"	Shade	3:15
5.	"John Hurt"	Paxton	3:14
6.	"Sunday Street"	Van Ronk	3:29
7.	"The Entertainer"	Scott Joplin	4:57
8.	"Candy Man"	Davis	3:05
9.	"Teddy Bear's Picnic"	Bratton, Kennedy	3:07
10.	"Mack the Knife"	Brecht, Weill	2:36
11.	"Tango Ballad"	Bratton, Kennedy	4:44
12.	"Losers"	Van Ronk	3:14
13.	"Garden State Stomp"	Van Ronk	3:33
14.	"Two Sleepy People"	Carmichael, Frank Loesser	3:38
15.	"The Fresno Shuffle"	Frandsen	2:47

- Track 1 originally on Songs for Ageing Children
- Tracks 2–4 originally on The Ragtime Jug Stompers
- Track 9 originally on Peter and the Wolf
- Tracks 10–11 originally on Let No One Deceive You
