= Inside Dave Van Ronk =

Studio album by Dave Van Ronk
- Released: October 1964
- Recorded: April 1962
- Genre: Folk
- Length: 35:35
- Label: Prestige/Folklore
- Producer: Samuel Charters

Dave Van Ronk chronology
Dave Van Ronk and the Ragtime Jug Stompers (1964)	Inside Dave Van Ronk (1964)	Just Dave Van Ronk (1964)

Professional ratings
Review scores
Source	Rating
The Penguin Guide to Blues Recordings	2/4 stars

Inside Dave Van Ronk is a 1964 album by the American folksinger Dave Van Ronk.

Inside Dave Van Ronk was recorded in April 1962 during the same sessions that produced Dave Van Ronk, Folksinger and that all ended up on the Fantasy Records 1989 CD release Inside Dave Van Ronk.

== Track listing ==
1. "House Carpenter" (Traditional) – 3:30
2. "The Cruel Ship's Captain" (Traditional) – 1:55
3. "Sprig of Thyme" (Traditional) – 2:35
4. "Talking Cancer Blues" (Rhodes) – 1:45
5. "I Buyed Me a Little Dog" (Traditional) – 3:59
6. "Lady Gay" (Traditional) – 3:40
7. "Fair and Tender Ladies" (Traditional) – 5:40
8. "Brian O'Lynne" (Traditional) – 1:15
9. "Shanty Man's Life" (Traditional) – 3:20
10. "Silver Dagger" (Traditional) – 2:20
11. "Kentucky Moonshiner" (Traditional) – 2:35
12. "He Never Came Back" (Traditional) – 2:10

== Personnel ==
- Dave Van Ronk – vocals, 6 and 12-string guitar, dulcimer, banjo, autoharp, harmonica
- Samuel Charters – producer
- Don Schlitten – cover photograph

== See also ==
- Inside Llewyn Davis, 2013 film inspired in part by Van Ronk's memoir, The Mayor of MacDougal Street, written with Elijah Wald, and taking its title and promo poster image from this record jacket.
