= Fixin' to Die Blues =

Traditional Delta blues song

Single by Bukka White
- B-side: "Black Train Blues"
- Released: 1940
- Recorded: May 8, 1940
- Studio: Chicago
- Genre: Blues
- Length: 2:47
- Label: Okeh
- Songwriter: Bukka White
- Producer: Lester Melrose

"Fixin' to Die Blues" is a song by American blues musician Bukka White. It is performed in the Delta blues style with White's vocal and guitar accompanied by washboard rhythm. White recorded it in Chicago on May 8, 1940, for record producer Lester Melrose. The song was written just days before, along with eleven others, at Melrose's urging.

== History ==
White was resuming his recording career, which had been interrupted by his incarceration for two years at the infamous Parchman Farm prison in Mississippi. While there, White witnessed the death of a friend and "got to wondering how a man feels when he dies". His lyrics reflect his thoughts about his children and wife:

I'm looking funny in my eyes, an' I b'lieve I'm fixin' to die (2×)
I know I was born to die, but I hate to leave my children cryin' ...
So many nights at the fireside, how my children's mother would cry (2×)
'Cause I ain't told their mother I had to say good-bye

White provides the vocal and acoustic slide guitar (which was borrowed from Big Bill Broonzy) with backing by Washboard Sam. Despite the somber lyrics, "the music throbs with a restless energy" with White's "bottleneck guitar crying in urgent counterpoint to his imagery". Music historian Ted Gioia notes that these recordings of White "come as close to art song as traditional blues has ever dared to go, but without losing any of the essential qualities of the Delta heritage". However, as with his other songs from the session, "Fixin' to Die Blues" did not capture the record buying public's interest. As a result, White largely retired from performing music, until a resurgence of interest in the early 1960s and the American folk music revival.

=== Resurgence and cover versions ===
In 1959, White's recording was included on The Country Blues, an album compiled by Samuel Charters.

In 1961, folksinger Bob Dylan recorded "Fixin' to Die" for his debut album, released the following year. The album liner notes indicate that it "was learned from an old recording by Bukka White". However, Dylan's arrangement uses a different melody line and some new lyrics. It is one of three blues songs on the album that deal with the theme of death. Dave Van Ronk (Dave Van Ronk, Folksinger) and Buffy Sainte-Marie (Many a Mile) are among Dylan's folk contemporaries who also recorded versions of the song.

Stretch recorded it for You Can't Beat Your Brain For Entertainment in 1976. Spacemen 3 adapted the lyrics for their song "Amen", alternatively titled "Hey Man" on the album Sound of Confusion. In 2002, Robert Plant recorded a version titled "Funny In My Mind (I Believe I'm Fixin' To Die)" for the Dreamland album. His former group, Led Zeppelin sometimes included it in live medleys with "Whole Lotta Love" (Led Zeppelin BBC Sessions). A live version by Chuck Ragan of Hot Water Music was included on Los Feliz in 2007. Valley Entertainment issued Miss Blues'es Child in 2007, which included Eli Cook's version. In 2010, G. Love and The Avett Brothers recorded the song as the title track of Fixin' to Die. Widespread Panic, accomp. on vocals by Col. Bruce Hampton, Ret., included a rendition on the band's 2012 double live album Wood.

== See also ==
- I-Feel-Like-I'm-Fixin'-to-Die Rag
