= In the Tradition (Dave Van Ronk album) =

Studio album by Dave Van Ronk
- Released: August 1963
- Genre: Folk
- Label: Prestige Folklore

Dave Van Ronk chronology
Folksinger (1962)	In the Tradition (1963)	Dave Van Ronk and the Ragtime Jug Stompers (1964)

In the Tradition is a 1963 album by the American folksinger Dave Van Ronk and The Red Onion Jazz Band. It is unusual in that the tracks are evenly split between Van Ronk and the Red Onions.

In the Tradition is out-of-print, but is included in the 2002 Fantasy Records CD reissue Two Sides of Dave Van Ronk which also contains most of Your Basic Dave Van Ronk. Some songs are also included in the Big Beat compilation Hesitation Blues.

== Reception ==
Professional ratings
Review scores
Source	Rating
Allmusic	3/5 stars

Writing for Allmusic, critic Richie Unterberger wrote of the album "a little strange for an early Dave Van Ronk LP, with the album split evenly between tracks on which the singer is backed by the Dixieland jazz-style combo the Red Onions and by more customary acoustic folk-blues solo guitar. Both of those styles were part of his persona, though it's the more somber acoustic folk-blues that stand out more. It's a reasonably strong album, not too much different from much of the rest of his catalog, other than in the balanced mixture between jazz and folk approaches."

== Track listing ==
1. "Cake Walkin' Babies From Home" (Smith, Troy, Williams) – 2:59
2. "Ace in the Hole" (Dempsey, Mitchell) – 2:53
3. "St. Louis Tickle" (Barney, Seymour) – 3:25
4. "Death Letter Blues" (Traditional) – 4:48
5. "If I Had To Do It All Over Again, I'd Do It All Over You" (Bob Dylan) – 3:33
6. "Whoa Back Buck" (Huddie Ledbetter, Alan Lomax) – 3:39
7. "Sister Kate" (Piron) – 3:04
8. "Kansas City Blues" (Jackson) – 2:10
9. "Green Rocky Road" (Chandler, Kaufman) – 3:39
10. "See See Rider" (Rainey) – 5:18
11. "Rocks and Gravel" (Traditional) – 4:27
12. "Hesitation Blues" (Traditional) – 3:32

== Personnel ==
- Dave Van Ronk - vocals, guitar
