= Phil Baxter =

American musician (1896–1972)

Phil Baxter (né Philip Kerley Baxter; 5 September 1896 Rural Shade, Texas (Note: The American Big Bands reference book gives Navarro, Texas as Baxter's birthplace.) – 21 November 1972 Dallas) was an American songwriter, singer and band leader.

== Early years ==
Baxter was born September 5, 1896, in Rural Shade, Texas — which after World War II became part of Kerens. He was raised in Marshall, Texas.

At age 14, Baxter played piano at a roller skating rink. He knew only one tune, but "the skaters didn't mind, for the noise of their rollers was louder than the piano music."

== Military service ==
During World War I, Baxter served at the Mare Island Naval Base in California. Violinist Paul Whiteman was also assigned to that base, and the two often entertained other sailors with musical performances.

== Compositions ==
Baxter is perhaps best known for his novelty song, "Piccolo Pete", a notable hit for Ted Weems and His Orchestra. Another song, "I'm a Ding Dong Daddy from Dumas" was successfully recorded by many artists, including Sidney Bechet, Bennie Moten, Arthur Godfrey, Bob Wills and Louis Armstrong.

== Career ==
Baxter led his own orchestra in the 1920s through the mid-1930s, leading two recording sessions, the first in October 1925 in St. Louis, Missouri, and the second in October 1929, in Dallas, Texas.

In the 1920s, Baxter formed an orchestra in Pine Bluff, Arkansas, but by 1925 the group was spending its winters playing in Little Rock, Arkansas.

In June 1927, (Note: An article in the Kansas City Times on May 4, 1966, says, "Phil Baxter and his Texas Tommies orchestra came to Kansas City in 1926. They played at the Submarine ballroom, and on December 15, 1927, they opened at El Torreon ballroom ...") Phil Baxter and His Texas Tommies performed at the just-opened El Torreon Ballroom in Kansas City, Missouri, becoming, as Phil Baxter and His El Torreon Orchestra, the ballroom's house band from 1927 to 1933. Baxter would open and close each night with the band's theme song, "El Torreon", and their nightly performances were frequently broadcast by KMBC in Kansas City. Additionally, he was a staff musician at WDAF in Kansas City.

Baxter enjoyed close ties with fellow bandleaders in the hot dance idiom, Ted Weems and Joe Haymes. As arranger for Weems, Haymes scored Baxter's jazz novelties such as "Piccolo Pete" and "The One Man Band," carrying on playing many Baxter songs with his own orchestra. Haymes and Baxter co-composed the 1932 Haymes hit "Let's Have A Party".

Phil Baxter ultimately suspended much of his musical activity due to difficulties stemming from arthritis.

== Other activities ==
In addition to his musical involvement, Baxter owned "a cleaning and dyeing establishment in Dallas, Texas".

== Personal life ==
Baxter and his wife, Ouida, had a son, Phil Baxter, Jr., who was a captain in the U.S. Air Force and was killed in an air attack over France in 1942.

== Death ==
Baxter died in Dallas, Texas, on November 21, 1972.

== Selected compositions ==
- "Piccolo Pete" (© 1929; renewed 1956)
- "Going, Going, Gone"
- "The One Man Band"
- "'Leven Miles from Leavenworth"
- "Smile For Me"
- "A Faded Summer Love"
- "Five Piece Band"
- "Let's Have a Party"
- "Harmonica Harry"
- "You're the Sweetest Girl"
- "Have a Little Dream on Me"
- "I'm a Ding Dong Daddy from Dumas" (© 1928; renewed 1955)
- "I've Got A Gal Seven Feet Tall" (© 1925; renewed 1953)
- "I've Got a Gal "Thousand Mile Blues" Arr. by F.R. Fuller (© 1921; Majestic Music Publishing Co, Dallas, TX)

Phil Baxter & Jack Rogers (words)
Earl Elleson McCoy (nl) (1884–1934) (music)
