= Folksinger (Dave Van Ronk album) =

1962 studio album by Dave Van Ronk

Studio album by Dave Van Ronk
- Released: November 1962
- Recorded: April 1962
- Studio: Van Gelder Studio
- Genres: Folk; folk jazz
- Length: 41:51
- Label: Prestige
- Producer: Shel Kagan

Dave Van Ronk chronology
Van Ronk Sings (1961)	Folksinger (1962)	In the Tradition (1963)

Folksinger is a studio album by the American folk musician Dave Van Ronk. It was released in November 1962 on the Prestige International label.

== History ==
Folksinger (Prestige International PR- INT 13056 [1962] reissued as Prestige Folklore FL 14012 [1963]) was recorded in April 1962. Inside Dave Van Ronk (Prestige Folklore FL 14025) would combine with it and all end up on the Fantasy Records 1989 CD release, Inside Dave Van Ronk. That combination was released as a double LP set in 1972 as Van Ronk (not the 1969 album of the same name). Songs from Folksinger along with selections from Inside Dave Van Ronk and In the Tradition were also released on the Big Beat label in the compilation Hesitation Blues.

== Reception ==
Professional ratings
Review scores
Source	Rating
Allmusic	5/5 stars

Allmusic gave it a 5 of 5 stars in their review and stated "This is a vital touchstone of Americana and likewise is highly recommended as a key component of any serious collection of 20th century folk music." It is the only Van Ronk album to have received 5/5 stars from Allmusic.

== Track listing ==
1. "He Was a Friend of Mine" - 3:29
2. "Motherless Children" - 3:45
3. "Stackerlee" - 3:32
4. "Mr. Noah" - 1:28
5. "Come Back, Baby" - 3:48
6. "Poor Lazarus" - 5:06
7. "Samson and Delilah" - 3:35
8. "Cocaine Blues" - 4:13
9. "You've Been a Good Old Wagon" - 2:16
10. "Fixin' to Die" - 2:50
11. "Hang Me, Oh Hang Me" - 3:07
12. "Long John" - 2:10
13. "Chicken is Nice" - 2:29

== Personnel ==
- Dave Van Ronk - guitar, vocals

== Production notes ==
- Engineered by Rudy Van Gelder
