= Dave Van Ronk and the Ragtime Jug Stompers =

Studio album by Dave Van Ronk
- Released: January 1964
- Genre: Jug band, blues, folk
- Label: Verve

Dave Van Ronk chronology
In the Tradition (1963)	Dave Van Ronk and the Ragtime Jug Stompers (1964)	Inside Dave Van Ronk (1964)

Dave Van Ronk and the Ragtime Jug Stompers is an album featuring Dave Van Ronk playing with a jug band.

== History ==
From The Mayor of MacDougal Street: "As for the jug band, that came about more or less by accident. One weekend Max Gordon, the owner of the Village Vanguard, was in Cambridge for some reason, and he walked by the Club 47 and saw this huge line of people waiting to get in to see the Jim Kweskin Jug Band. In his mind's eye he transposed this queue to 7th Avenue South, where he had his room, and visions of sugarplums started dancing in his head. So when he got back to New York, he called Robert Shelton and said, "Are there any jug bands around town?" Bob said, "Well, yeah, but what you really ought to do is get hold of Dave Van Ronk and have him put one together." So he did, and I did. I called up a bunch of friends, and we formed the Ragtime Jug Stompers. Sam Charters was back in town, so he was our Pooh-Bah and Lord High Everything Else—he sang, arranged, and played washtub bass, washboard, jug, and occasionally would lend a hand on guitar. Barry Kornfeld played banjo and guitar. Artie Rose was on mandolin, and also played some fine Dobro. Finally, Danny Kalb, who had been a student of mine, played lead guitar and some very nice harmonica. (We also made him sing bass on "K.C. Moan," because he was the youngest and none of us wanted to do it.) It was a very flexible band because the musicians were all good enough to double or triple on various instruments, plus it had all the possibilities offered by kazoos and that sort of thing, so it was capable of more than one kind of sound."

It was re-released on CD in Japan in 2003 by Universal.

== Reception ==
Professional ratings
Review scores
Source	Rating
Allmusic	3/5 stars

Writing for Allmusic, music critic Richard Meyer wrote "This wild and unrestrained collection of blues, jazz and blues standards makes Van Ronk's Red Onion album sound positively subdued. The rave-up of "Everybody Loves My Baby" is an acoustic equivalent of garage bands-to-come for sheer energy... it's a record brimming with an energetic spirit."

== Track listing ==
Arranged by Dave Van Ronk and the Jug Stompers.

1. "Everybody Loves My Baby" (Spencer Williams, Jack Palmer) – 2:53
2. "Stealin' (long version)" (Will Shade) – 3:13
3. "Saint Louis Tickle" (James O'Dea, Barney, Seymore) – 3:33
4. "Sister Kate" (Armand Piron, Clarence Williams) – 2:17
5. "Take it slow and easy" (Jesse Fuller) – 2:25
6. "Mack the Knife" (Kurt Weill, Bertold Brecht, Marc Blitzstein) – 2:35
7. "Diggin' my Potatoes" (Sonny Terry) – 2:A3
8. "Temptation Rag" (Henry Lodge, Louis Weslyn) – 3:09
9. "Shake that Thing" (Papa Charlie Jackson) – 2:50
10. "K.C. Moan" (Tewee Blackman) – 3:36
11. "Georgia Camp Meeting" (Traditional) – 2:45
12. "You's a Viper" (Thomas "Fats" Waller) – 2:32

== Personnel ==
- Dave Van Ronk - guitar, vocals
- Danny Kalb - guitar
- Barry Kornfeld - banjo
- Artie Rose - mandolin
- Samuel Charters - jug, washtub bass, backing vocals
