= Hummin' to Myself (Dave Van Ronk album) =

Studio album by Dave Van Ronk
- Released: 1990
- Recorded: Home Base Studios, New York, NY
- Genre: Folk
- Length: 48:32
- Label: Gazell
- Producer: Sam Charters

Dave Van Ronk chronology
Let No One Deceive You (1990)	Hummin' to Myself (1990)	Peter and the Wolf (1991)

Hummin' to Myself is a 1990 album of jazz and pop classics recorded by Dave Van Ronk.

== Track listing ==
1. "Wrap Your Troubles in Dreams (And Dream Your Troubles Away)" (Harry Barris, Ted Koehler, Billy Moll) – 3:31
2. "Makin' Whoopee" (Walter Donaldson, Gus Kahn) – 3:15
3. "I Can't Give You Anything But Love" (Dorothy Fields, Jimmy McHugh) – 4:21
4. "Sweet Georgia Brown" (Ben Bernie, Kenneth Casey, Maceo Pinkard) – 3:14
5. "Hummin' to Myself" (Sammy Fain, Herb Magidson, Monty Siegel) – 5:24
6. "Hong Kong Blues" (Hoagy Carmichael) – 3:30
7. "I'm Just a Lucky So and So" (Duke Ellington, Mack David) – 4:32
8. "The Fresno Shuffle" (Erik Frandsen) – 2:45
9. "Gee Baby, Ain't I Good to You" (Andy Razaf, Don Redman) – 4:22
10. "Two Sleepy People" (Carmichael, Frank Loesser) – 3:35
11. "It Ain't Necessarily So" (George Gershwin, Ira Gershwin) – 3:28
12. "Do You Know What It Means to Miss New Orleans?" (Louis Alter, Eddie DeLange) – 3:45
13. "Jack, You're Dead!" (Walter Bishop, Dick Miles) – 2:50

== Personnel ==
- Dave Van Ronk – vocals, guitar
- Christine Lavin – additional vocals
- Keith Ingham – piano & studio arrangements
- John Pizzarelli – guitar
- Earl May – bass guitar
- Link Milliman – bass guitar on 6 & 11
- Harry Allen – tenor saxophone

== Production notes ==
- Produced by Sam Charters
- Warren Bruleigh – engineer
- Erik Behrend – assistant
- Cover Photo by Raymond Ross
- Session Photos by Sam Charters
