= The Folkways Years, 1959–1961 =

Compilation album by Dave Van Ronk
- Released: 1991
- Recorded: 1959–1961
- Genre: Folk
- Length: 60:15
- Label: Smithsonian Folkways
- Producer: Dave Van Ronk

Dave Van Ronk chronology
Hummin' to Myself (1990)	The Folkways Years, 1959–1961 (1991)	A Chrestomathy (1992)

The Folkways Years, 1959–1961 is a compilation album of songs by Dave Van Ronk released in 1991.

== Reception ==
Professional ratings
Review scores
Source	Rating
Allmusic	5/5 stars
The Penguin Guide to Blues Recordings	2.5/4 stars

Writing for AllMusic, critic William Ruhlman wrote of Van Ronk's musical background and that he continued to "... play and sing hard, as if still trying to be heard over Dixieland arrangements. That sounded unusual to the more polite folk audiences of the time, in contrast to singers who played tame versions of traditional folk and blues tunes. But more than three decades later, it keeps Van Ronk's performances from sounding as dated as those of many of his peers do. Nobody worries much anymore about an articulate, urban white man trying to sound like an unlettered, rural black man, and these recordings have proven very influential... If he was imitating the originators at the time, now he sounds like a master whose work has been emulated by the rock musicians who followed him (and who made a lot more money doing so than he ever did)."

== Track listing ==
1. "Duncan and Brady" – 3:00
2. "Hesitation Blues" (Davis) – 2:32
3. "In the Pines" – 3:04
4. "Willie the Weeper" (Bloom, Melrose, Rymal) – 2:47
5. "Twelve Gates to the City" – 3:12
6. "River Come Down" – 3:43
7. "Careless Love" (Handy, Koenig, Williams) – 3:56
8. "Betty and Dupree" (McGhee) – 3:34
9. "Bed Bug Blues" – 2:43
10. "Leave Her Johnny" – 1:26
11. "Yas-Yas-Yas" (Traditional) – 2:05
12. "Please See That My Grave Is Kept Clean" – 2:54
13. "Winin' Boy" – 2:35
14. "Just a Closer Walk With Thee" (Traditional) – 3:00
15. "Gambler's Blues" (Traditional) – 2:42
16. "Spike Driver's Moan" – 3:11
17. "Georgie on the IRT" – 3:28
18. "Come Back Baby" (Davis) – 3:51
19. "Black Mountain Blues" – 4:00
20. "My Baby's So Sweet" – 2:32
