= Charley Jordan =

American blues singer, songwriter and guitarist (1890–1954)

- Born: Charles Jordan Jr. July 11, 1890; Memphis, Tennessee, U.S.
- Died: November 15, 1954 (aged 64) St. Louis, Missouri, U.S.
- Genres: St. Louis blues
- Occupations: Singer-songwriter; Guitarlist; Scout
- Instruments: Vocal; Guitar

Charley Jordan (July 11, 1890 – November 15, 1954) was an American St. Louis blues singer, songwriter and guitarist, as well as a talent scout, originally from Mabelvale, Arkansas, United States. He was known for a unique style that drew on his rural roots.

== Life and career ==
Jordan recorded numerous singles for Vocalion and Decca between 1930 and 1937, and also performed with some well-regarded bluesmen from the 1920s to the 1940s. Jordan played with Peetie Wheatstraw, Roosevelt Sykes, Casey Bill Weldon and Memphis Minnie. Noted for his "crisply firm guitar", he had most of his biggest hits, including "Keep It Clean", in the early to mid-1930s. Later in that decade and into the 1940s, he worked frequently with Big Joe Williams.

== Spinal injury ==
In 1928, Jordan was shot in the spine, this was due to his extramusical career as a bootlegger. This gave him a long term disability and caused him to walk with crutches thereafter (which can be seen in the few photographs of Jordan available).

Jordan died of pneumonia or violence in 1954 in St. Louis, Missouri. The Killer Blues Headstone Project placed a headstone for Charley Jordan.

== Discography ==
A partial discography is available online.

=== Songs ===
- "Big Four Blues"
- "Got Your Water On Blues"
- "Crazy With the Blues"
- "Dollar Bill Blues"
- "Honeysucker Blues"
- "Hunkie Tunkie Blues"
- "I Couldn't Stay Here"
- "Just a Spoonful"
- "Keep It Clean"
- "Raidin' Squad Blues"
- "Stack O'Dollars Blues"

=== Compilations ===
- 1992 - Charlie Jordan Vol. 1, 1930 - 1931 - Document
- 1992 - Charlie Jordan Vol. 2, 1931 - 1934 - Document
- 1992 - Charlie Jordan Vol. 3, 1935 - 1937 - Document
- 2004 - The Essential Charley Jordan - Classic Blues

== Other sources ==
- "Christmas Blues Notes Vol. 2". Bad Dog Blues. Archived from the original on 2006-10-20.
- Charlie Jordan Vol. 1, 1930 - 1931 : sleeve notes on Charley Jordan
