= St. James Infirmary Blues =

American blues song and jazz standard

Single by Louis Armstrong
- B-side: "Save It Pretty Mama"
- Recorded: December 12, 1928
- Genre: jazz
- Length: 3:12
- Label: OKeh
- Composer: Don Redman or Joe Primrose

Audio sample
- "St. James Infirmary" on tenor sax: file; help

"St. James Infirmary" is an American blues and jazz standard that emerged, like many others, from folk traditions. Louis Armstrong brought the song to lasting fame through his 1928 recording, on which Don Redman is named as composer; later releases credit "Joe Primrose", a pseudonym used by musician manager, music promoter and publisher Irving Mills. The melody is eight bars long, unlike songs in the classic blues genre, where there are 12 bars. It is in a minor key, and has a 4/4 time signature, but has also been played in 3/4.

== 20th century authorship history ==
The perennially popular song known today as "St. James Infirmary" (also known as "Gambler's Blues") originated as an American folk song.

- Carl Moore and Phil Baxter published copyrighted sheet music for the song, entitled "Gambler's Blues", under Baxter's own imprint and through Harry D. Squires, Inc. in 1925.
- Poet Carl Sandburg's renowned 1927 compilation of folksongs he had collected across the country over the previous 20 years, The American Songbag, included lyrics and music notation for the two principal versions of the song later popularized, the song therein called "Those Gambler's Blues".
- In 1927, Fess Williams and his Royal Flush Orchestra released the first recording of the song under the title "Gambler's Blues", crediting Moore and Baxter.
- Louis Armstrong and his Savoy Ballroom Five recorded the song in December 1928. Okeh Records released Armstrong's recording, entitled "St. James Infirmary", crediting the composition solely to noted jazzman Don Redman, who had joined Armstrong's band for this session. Nonetheless, the second and subsequent releases of this recording credited the composition to one Joe Primrose.
- Beginning in 1929, Mills Music, Inc. published, advertised and promoted the sheet music for its arrangement of the song under the title "St. James' Infirmary", crediting its composition to Irving Mills's nom de plume, "Joe Primrose". Despite losing a New York State unfair competition lawsuit it brought against a rival music publisher on appeal, Mills Music somehow retained effective control over rights to the song, thereby profiting from it for decades, as though the song had not been in the public domain.

== Recording history ==
The tune first appears as "Charleston Cabin", on a 1924 disc by the California Ramblers, in which it is intermixed with another tune reminiscent of "Swannee River", suggesting a possible inspiration.

In 1927, Fess Williams and his Royal Flush Orchestra became the first to record the song (under the name "Gambler's Blues") crediting Carl Moore and Phil Baxter. As "St. James' Infirmary", the song became all the more popular after Armstrong's recording and the promotional efforts of Mills Music, Inc. By 1930 at least twenty different recordings had been released, many of the early hit recordings were by clients of Mills Artists, Inc. The Duke Ellington Orchestra recorded the song multiple times under names like "The Ten Black Berries", "The Harlem Hot Chocolates", and "The Jungle Band". In 1933, Cab Calloway's version anchored a classic Betty Boop cartoon and his instrumental version introduced another that featured Calloway's related hit song, "Minnie the Moocher". Irving Mills managed the careers of both Calloway and Ellington, and Mills Music published them both.

The country music singer Jimmie Rodgers recorded the song in 1930 (as "Those Gambler's Blues"). In 1932 Rodgers recorded "Gambling Bar Room Blues", co-written with Shelly Lee Alley, with a similar melody but new lyrics and themes of alcohol abuse, violence and despair. Cajun string band the Dixie Ramblers recorded "Barroom Blues" in 1935, with lyrics largely matching Rodgers' "Those Gambler's Blues".

In 1961, Bobby "Blue" Bland released a version of "Saint James Infirmary" on the flip side of his No. 2 R&B hit "Don't Cry No More" and included it in his album Two Steps from the Blues. In 1967, the French-American singer Joe Dassin recorded the song. In 1968, Don Partridge released a version on his self-named album, as did Eric Burdon and the Animals on their album Every One of Us. Dock Boggs recorded a version of the song entitled "Old Joe's Barroom" (1965).

More recently, the song has been performed by cabaret surrealists the Mystic Knights of the Oingo Boingo in Southern California; the band's vocalist and songwriter, Danny Elfman, citing Cab Calloway as his inspiration. The White Stripes included the song on their self-titled debut album; the White's first encounter with the song having been the Betty Boop cartoon. In 2012, Trombone Shorty and Booker T. Jones performed the song (with musical references to "Minnie the Moocher") for President Obama and guests at the White House "Red, White, and Blues" concert.

Other notable recordings include (among hundreds):

- The Hokum Boys - "Gambler's Blues" (1929)
- Artie Shaw and His Orchestra, with Hot Lips Page providing vocals (1941)
- Josh White (1944)
- Turk Murphy (1951)
- Kid Ory's Creole Jazz Band - Kid Ory's Creole Jazz Band 1953 (1953)
- Johnny Duncan - Johnny Duncan's Tennessee Song Bag (1958)
- Snooks Eaglin – New Orleans Street Singer (Folkways, 1959)
- Dave Van Ronk - "Gambler's Blues", on Dave Van Ronk Sings Ballads, Blues, and a Spiritual (1959)
- Lou Rawls – Black and Blue (1963)
- Colette Magny - "St. James Infirmary Blues" (1964)
- The Standells – Try It (1967)
- Joe Dassin – St. James Infirmary Blues (1967)
- Eric Burdon & The Animals - Every One Of Us (1968)
- Jerry Reed - Jerry Reed Explores Country Guitar (1969)
- Kenny Ball - King of the Swingers (1969)
- The Doors - Performed Live (1969-1970)
- Joe Cocker – Joe Cocker (1972)
- Geordie - "Goin' Down", on Don't Be Fooled by the Name (1974)
- Lily Tomlin - Saturday Night Live (1975)
- The Triffids - Raining Pleasure (1984)
- Canadian Brass – Basin Street (1987)
- Doc Watson and Richard Watson – Third Generation Blues (1999)
- Toshiyuki Honda – Metropolis original motion picture soundtrack (2001)
- Isobel Campbell and Mark Lanegan (2005)
- The Devil Makes Three – A Little Bit Faster and a Little Bit Worse (under the title St James) (2006)
- Arlo Guthrie with the University of Kentucky Symphony Orchestra – In Times Like These (2007)
- Rising Appalachia – The Sails of Self (2010)
- Hugh Laurie – Let Them Talk (2011)
- Rickie Lee Jones – The Devil You Know (2012)
- Jon Batiste and Stay Human, Social Music; (2013)
- Dalice Marie – Twenty Eight (2016)
- Yo-Yo Ma's Silkroad Ensemble with Rhiannon Giddens – Sing Me Home (2016)
- Jon Batiste – Hollywood Africans (2018)
- The Bridge City Sinners - Bridge City Sinners (2016)
- Liquor Beats Winter - Lost In The Sauce (2018)

== Lyrical variations ==
There are over twenty versions of the lyrics, but most fall broadly into under the versions identified by Sandburg as A and B. The Louis Armstrong on a 1928 Okeh Records release is the exemplar of the shorter, A version:

I went down to St. James Infirmary,
Saw my baby there,
Stretched out on a long white table,
So cold, so sweet, so fair.
Let her go, let her go, God bless her,
Wherever she may be,
She can look this wide world over,
But she'll never find a sweet man like me.

The B-type versions, including Moore & Baxter's "Gambler's Blues", begin and end with a framing backstory, in which a narrator encounters a patron of "Joe's bar room", named Joe McKinney, or similar, and tells the song's story in the very words he said, with the song ending back in the bar room, drinking another shot of booze.

The hallmark of nearly all the variants is the uncanny pivot from the visitor initially mourning his deceased victim, to boasts about himself and how she'll miss him, to instructions for his own grand funeral:

Let her go, let her go, God bless her
Wherever she may be
She can search this world wide over
But she'll never find a sweet man like me.
When I die, bury me in straight-lace shoes,
I want a box-back coat and a Stetson hat.
Put a twenty-dollar gold piece on my watch chain,
So the boys'll know that I died standin' pat.

Many versions include additional funeral instructions:

Sixteen coal-black horses,
All hitch to a rubber-tired hack,
Carried seven girls to the graveyard,
And only six of 'em coming' back.
Six crap shooters as pall bearers
Let a chorus girl sing me a song
With a jazz band on my hearse
To raise hell as we go along.

The funeral instructions echo some verses characteristic of "The Unfortunate Rake" song cycle. Blind Willie McTell's "Dying Crapshooter's Blues", contains parallel verses as well. Bob Dylan's 1981 homage, "Blind Willie McTell", contained musical references to both "Dyin' Crapshooter's Blues" and "St. James Infirmary".

== Theories about historical sources ==
Like many traditional songs, this one represents a confluence of many sources. Different commentators have differing view of the importance of their respective contributions to the song we know today.

Some, following A.L. Lloyd, attempt to connect the St. James Infirmary to an 18th-century folk song, known by many names, including "The Unfortunate Rake", although their theme, music and lyrics bear little resemblance to St. James' Infirmary at all. The Rake is about a soldier dying in the hospital from a venereal disease. The earliest known form of this song was called "The Buck's Elegy" and is set in Covent Garden, London. This song is known as "The Unfortunate Lad", "The Young Man Cut Down in His Prime", and "the Buck's Elegy",

According to Robert W. Harwood, who rejects Lloyd's conclusions, A. L. Lloyd was the first to attempt to connect "St. James Infirmary" with "The Unfortunate Lad/Rake". Harwood points to Lloyd's 1947 article in English music magazine Keynote. and his 1956 revised article published in Sing magazine. In both articles Lloyd refers to an English broadside song entitled "The Unfortunate Lad", commenting that the song is sometimes known as "The Unfortunate Rake", but with no date or source for the latter title given. The opening line of this version of the song refers to a "lock hospital", with no mention of St. James. The term "lock hospital" was the name of an institution in Southwark, London, where lepers were isolated and treated. The term "lock hospital" referred to a facility in which first lepers and later people suffering from venereal disease were isolated and confined.

Lloyd deems a song collected by Cecil Sharp in the Appalachians in 1918 which references a "St. James Hospital" to be the parent song of both St. James Infirmary and the Streets of Laredo" (a.k.a. "The Dying Cowboy"). The opening of that song, as quoted by Lloyd, is:

As I went down by St James Hospital one morning,
So early one morning, it was early one day,
I found my son, my own son,
Wrapped up in white linen, as cold as the clay.

Lloyd traces this Appalachian song to a "The Unfortunate Lad", published by Such in London in the 1850s, a song about a "lock hospital":

As I was walking down by the Lock Hospital,
As I was walking one morning of late,
Who did I spy but my own dear comrade,
Wrapp'd up in flannel, so hard was his fate.

Lloyd asserts that St. James Infirmary is, or was before it became corrupted, a narrative ballad. "Such ballads are rare in Negro song... So doubts are raised about whether 'St. James Infirmary' began life as a Negro song." The second article includes the following comment on the song: "Most versions of 'Infirmary' include a number of stanzas from other songs, grafted on to the main stem – a confusion especially common with songs current among Negroes. The curious switchover from the actual death of the girl to the hypothetical death of the gambler creates some ambiguity too." Lloyd notes that in some early variants of "The Unfortunate Rake", the sex of the victim of venereal disease was female. "We realize that the confusion in the 'Infirmary', where the dead person is a woman but the funeral is ordered for a man, is surely due to the fact that the original ballad was commonly recorded in a form in which the sexes were reversed, so singers were often in two minds whether they were singing of a rakish man or a bad girl."

Lloyd's second article is cited as a reference by Kenneth Goldstein in his liner notes for a 1960 Folkways LP called The Unfortunate Rake. These liner notes are often used as a source for the history of "St. James Infirmary Blues". They raise the question of whether St. James' Hospital was a real place and, if so, where it was. Goldstein claimed in the notes that "St. James" refers to London's St. James' Hospital, a religious foundation for the treatment of leprosy. His references list an article by Kenneth Lodewick. That article states, giving no reference or source for the idea, that the phrase "St. James Hospital" refers to a hospital of that name in London. There is some difficulty in this because the hospital in question closed in 1532 when Henry VIII acquired the land to build St James's Palace.

Another possibility suggested by Higginbotham on the basis of his claim that the song "St. James Infirmary" dates at least from the early nineteenth century is the Infirmary section of the St James Workhouse which the St. James Parish opened in 1725 on Poland Street, Soho, and which continued well into the nineteenth century. This St. James Infirmary was contemporaneous with the estimated advent of the song "The Unfortunate Lad", but it is not the London Lock Hospital. Another difficulty is that, out of the early versions of the song mentioned in the references given by Goldstein, only the one collected by Cecil Sharp in the Appalachians in 1918, and one found in Canada in the 1920s, make use of the phrase "St. James".

The liner notes link the Rake to an early fragment called "My Jewel, My Joy", stating that it was heard in Dublin. The same statement appears in the Lodewick article referenced in those notes The notes given in the source cited for this fragment, a collection of songs collected by William Forde and published by P. W. Joyce, state that the song was heard in Cork, not Dublin.

The version of the "Unfortunate Rake" on the LP of that name is sung by Lloyd, of whom it has been said that he "sometimes modified lyrics or melodies to make the songs more palatable for contemporary listeners", and its first verse is as follows:

As I was a-walking down by St. James Hospital,
I was a-walking down by there one day.
What should I spy but one of my comrades
All wrapped up in a flannel though warm was the day.

"The Unfortunate Rake" (traditional song: this variation is from a 1960 Folkways LP edited by Goldstein, where it was sung by A L Lloyd, and is also the version given by Harwood, apparently using the same source. It is sung to the tune of "My Jewel, My Joy", for reasons explained by Lloyd in an article referenced in the liner notes to this LP )

The liner notes state that Lloyd is singing a nineteenth-century broadside version, but do not specify which. The Lloyd article cited in the references given in the liner notes, refers to a version published by Such and to no other version. The title and words sung by Lloyd are not those of the Such broadside which has no reference to St. James and is not called "The Unfortunate Rake". Lloyd recorded a slightly different version in 1966, this time calling the song "St James Hospital". In 1967, his book Folk Song in England was published. This includes some comment on the song, claims without any supporting references or information that a Czech version pre-dates the British ones, repeats the confusion between Dublin and Cork as the place where the "My Jewel My Joy" fragment had been heard, and includes an unattributed quotation of two verses that differ from the versions sung by Lloyd.

Variations typically feature a narrator telling the story of a young man "cut down in his prime" (occasionally, a young woman "cut down in her prime") as a result of morally questionable behaviour. For example, when the song moved to America, gambling and alcohol became common causes of the youth's death.

== See also ==
- List of pre-1920 jazz standards
