= Dave Van Ronk =

American folk musician (1936–2002)

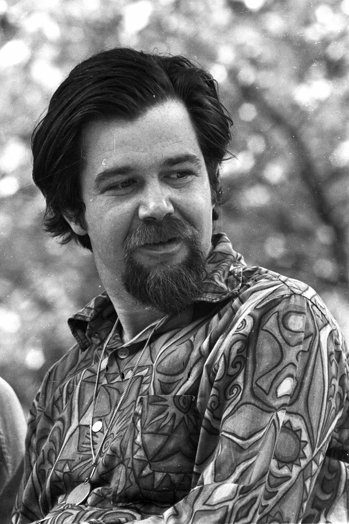
- Van Ronk in 1968

Background information
- Born: David Kenneth Ritz Van Ronk; June 30, 1936; New York City, U.S.
- Died: February 10, 2002 (aged 65) New York City, U.S.
- Genres: Folk; ragtime; blues; country blues
- Occupations: Musician; songwriter
- Instruments: Guitar; vocals; piano
- Years active: 1959–2002
- Label: Folkways

David Kenneth Ritz Van Ronk (June 30, 1936 – February 10, 2002) was an American folk singer. An important figure in the American folk music revival and New York City's Greenwich Village scene in the 1960s, he was nicknamed the "Mayor of MacDougal Street".

Van Ronk's work ranged from old English ballads to blues, gospel, rock, New Orleans jazz, and swing. He was also known for performing instrumental ragtime guitar music, especially his transcription of "St. Louis Tickle" and Scott Joplin's "Maple Leaf Rag". Van Ronk was a widely admired avuncular figure in the Village, presiding over the coffeehouse folk culture and acting as a friend to many up-and-coming artists by inspiring, assisting, and promoting them. Folk performers he befriended include Jim and Jean, Bob Dylan, Tom Paxton, Patrick Sky, Phil Ochs, Ramblin' Jack Elliott, and Joni Mitchell. Dylan recorded Van Ronk's arrangement of the traditional song "House of the Rising Sun" on his first album, which The Animals would later turn into a chart-topping single in 1964, helping to inaugurate the folk rock movement.

Van Ronk received a Lifetime Achievement Award from the American Society of Composers, Authors and Publishers (ASCAP) in December 1997.

== Life and career ==
Van Ronk was born in Bushwick, Brooklyn, New York City, to a family that was "mostly Irish, despite the Dutch 'Van' name". He moved from Brooklyn to Richmond Hill, Queens around 1945 and began attending Holy Child Jesus Catholic School, whose students were mainly of Irish descent. He had been performing in a barbershop quartet since 1949, but left before finishing high school spending time in the Merchant Marine.

His first professional gigs were playing tenor banjola, a wooden-bodied combination of mandola and banjo, with various traditional jazz bands around New York City, of which he later observed: "We wanted to play traditional jazz in the worst way ... and we did!" But the trad jazz revival had already passed its prime, and Van Ronk turned to performing the blues he had stumbled across while shopping for jazz 78s by artists like the Reverend Gary Davis, Furry Lewis and Mississippi John Hurt.

By about 1958, he was firmly committed to the folk-blues style, accompanying himself with his own acoustic guitar. He performed blues, jazz and folk music, occasionally writing his own songs but generally arranging the work of earlier artists and his folk revival peers.

He became noted both for his large physical stature and for his expansive charisma, which bespoke an intellectual, cultured gentleman of diverse talents. Among his many interests were cooking, science fiction (he was active for some time in science fiction fandom, referring to it as "mind rot", and contributed to fanzines), world history, and politics. During the 1960s he supported left-wing political causes and was, at various times, a member of the Libertarian League and the Young Socialist League, at that time the youth wing of the "Shachtmanite" Independent Socialist League. In 1964, he was part of a group expelled from the Trotskyist Socialist Workers Party which would eventually go on to become the American Committee for the Fourth International (ACFI, later renamed the Workers League).

In 1974, he appeared at "An Evening For Salvador Allende", a concert organized by Phil Ochs, alongside such other performers as his old friend Bob Dylan, to protest the overthrow of the democratic socialist government of Chile and to aid refugees from the U.S.-backed military junta led by Augusto Pinochet. After Ochs's death by suicide in 1976, Van Ronk joined the many performers who played at his memorial concert in the Felt Forum at Madison Square Garden, playing his bluesy version of the traditional folk ballad "He Was A Friend Of Mine". Although Van Ronk was less politically active in later years, he remained committed to anarchist and socialist ideals and was a dues-paying member of the Industrial Workers of the World (IWW) almost until his death. According to former wife and manager Terri Thal, Van Ronk "insisted that he was a Trotskyist until he died."

Van Ronk was among 13 people arrested at the Stonewall Inn June 28, 1969, the night of the Stonewall Riots, which is widely credited as the spark of the contemporary gay rights movement. He had been dining at a neighboring restaurant and joined the riot against the police occupation of the club and was dragged from the crowd into the building by police deputy inspector Seymour Pine. The police slapped and punched Van Ronk to the point of near unconsciousness, handcuffed him to a radiator near the doorway, and charged him with assault. Recalling the expanding riot, Van Ronk said, "There were more people out there [outside the building] when I came out than when I went in. Things were still flying through the air, cacophony—I mean, just screaming and yelling, sirens, strobe lights, the whole spaghetti." The next day, he was arrested and later released on his own recognizance for having thrown a heavy object at a police officer. City records show he was charged with felony assault in the second degree and pleaded guilty to the lesser charge of harassment, classified in 1969 as a violation under PL 240.25.

In 2000, he performed at Blind Willie's in Atlanta, speaking fondly of his impending return to Greenwich Village. He reminisced over tunes like "You've Been a Good Old Wagon", a song teasing a worn-out lover, which he ruefully remarked had seemed humorous to him back in 1962.

He continued to perform for four decades and gave his last concert just a few months before his death.

== Personal life ==
Van Ronk was married to Terri Thal in the 1960s, lived for many years with Joanne Grace, then married Andrea Vuocolo, with whom he spent the rest of his life.

On February 10, 2002, Van Ronk died in a New York hospital of cardiopulmonary failure while undergoing postoperative treatment for colon cancer. He died before completing work on his memoirs, which were finished by his collaborator, Elijah Wald, and published in 2005 as The Mayor of MacDougal Street.

== Influences ==
Van Ronk's guitar work, for which he credits Tom Paley as fingerpicking teacher, is noteworthy for both syncopation and precision. Revealing similarities to Mississippi John Hurt's, Van Ronk's main influence was the Reverend Gary Davis, who conceived the guitar as "a piano around his neck." Van Ronk took this pianistic approach and added a harmonic sophistication adapted from the band voicings of Jelly Roll Morton and Duke Ellington.

Van Ronk was among the first to adapt traditional jazz and ragtime to the solo acoustic guitar with arrangements of such ragtime staples as "St. Louis Tickle", "The Entertainer", "The Pearls" and "Maple Leaf Rag". Van Ronk brought the blues style to Greenwich Village during the 1960s, while introducing the folk music world to the complex harmonies of Kurt Weill with his many Brecht and Weill interpretations. A traditional revivalist who moved with the times, Van Ronk brought old blues and ballads together with the new sounds of Dylan, Mitchell and Leonard Cohen. Dylan says of his impact:

"I'd heard Van Ronk back in the Midwest on records and thought he was pretty great, copied some of his recordings phrase for phrase. [...] Van Ronk could howl and whisper, turn blues into ballads and ballads into blues. I loved his style. He was what the city was all about. In Greenwich Village, Van Ronk was king of the street, he reigned supreme".

Van Ronk was one of the first mentors to Dylan when the young Minnesotan arrived in New York City in 1961, and quickly recognized Dylan's promise, and his unique persona.

He was marvelous. He was marvelous. I wish there were films. He had a kind of a herky-jerky stage presence, that was almost Chaplinesque. And a master of timing - he could make anything hilariously funny just by using timing. The nearest thing I can think of to his mastery of timing is Jack Benny. He had people in stitches all the time. He did the same thing with his harmonica. He would blow a note. And then another note. Playing all the time. And he would play his notes so that you never could tell when one was coming. Always with an absolute straight face... As a performer, I think most of his power came from his sense of timing.... Nobody thought he was anything more than an exceptionally good performer at the outset. We were tremendously shocked at how good a songwriter he was when he really got growing.

Dylan frequently slept on a couch in the apartment Van Ronk shared with his wife, Teri Thal, Dylan's first manager.

Van Ronk gave guitar lessons in Greenwich Village, including to Christine Lavin, David Massengill, Elijah Wald, Terre Roche and Suzzy Roche. He influenced his protégé Danny Kalb and the Blues Project.

Van Ronk once said, "Painting is all about space, and music is all about time."

== Legacy ==
The Coen brothers film Inside Llewyn Davis follows a folk singer similar to Van Ronk, and incorporates a number of songs and guitar arrangements from his repertoire, as well as several scenes from his memoir. He is mentioned in David Bowie's 2013 song, ‘(You Will) Set the World on Fire' on The Next Day and was mentioned among the dead musicians and recording artists in the song, "Mirror Door" by the Who in 2006, on the album, Endless Wire.

His friend, and contemporary, Tom Paxton, wrote the song, "The Mayor of Macdougal Street" about Van Ronk, noting, "Never knew a man to suffer fools less gladly, or to view this world of ours with more jaundiced eye..."

In 2004, a section of Sheridan Square, where Barrow Street meets Washington Place, was renamed, "Dave Van Ronk Street" in his memory. Van Ronk was awarded the Lifetime Achievement Award posthumously by the World Folk Music Association in 2004.

Joni Mitchell said that Van Ronk's rendition of her song, "Both Sides, Now" (which he called "Clouds"), was her favorite version of the song.

Van Ronk was portrayed by Joe Tippett in the 2024 film A Complete Unknown.

== Personal characteristics ==
Van Ronk refused for many years to fly and never learned to drive (he took trains or buses or, when possible, recruited a girlfriend or young musician as his driver), and he declined to ever move from Greenwich Village for any extended period of time (having stayed in California for a short time in the 1960s). Van Ronk's trademark stoneware jug of Tullamore Dew was frequently seen on stage next to him in his early days.

Critic Robert Shelton described Van Ronk as "the musical mayor of MacDougal Street" -

..."a tall, garrulous, hairy man of three quarters, or, more accurately, three fifths Irish descent. Topped by light brownish hair and a leonine beard which he smoothed down several times a minute, he resembled an unmade bed strewn with books, record jackets, pipes, empty whiskey bottles, lines from obscure poets, finger picks, and broken guitar strings. He was [Dylan]'s first New York guru. Van Ronk was a walking museum of the blues. Through an early interest in jazz, he had gravitated toward black music—its jazz pole, its jug-band and ragtime center, its blues bedrock.... His manner was rough and testy, disguising a warm, sensitive core."

== Discography ==
For an in depth, illustrated discography, see https://www.wirz.de/music/vanronk.htm

=== Studio albums ===
- 1959: Van Ronk Sings Ballads, Blues, and a Spiritual (also released as Gambler's Blues and Black Mountain Blues) (Folkways)
- 1961: Dave Van Ronk Sings (also released as Dave Van Ronk Sings the Blues and Dave Van Ronk Sings Earthy Ballads and Blues) (Folkways)
- 1962: Folksinger (Prestige)
- 1963: In the Tradition (Prestige)
- 1964: Inside Dave Van Ronk (Prestige)
- 1964: Dave Van Ronk and the Ragtime Jug Stompers (Mercury)
- 1964: Just Dave Van Ronk (Mercury)
- 1966: No Dirty Names (Verve/Forecast)
- 1967: Dave Van Ronk and the Hudson Dusters (Verve Forecast)
- 1971: Van Ronk (Polydor)
- 1973: Songs for Ageing Children (Cadet)
- 1976: Sunday Street (Philo)
- 1980: Somebody Else, Not Me (Philo)
- 1982: Your Basic Dave Van Ronk
- 1985: Going Back to Brooklyn (Reckless)
- 1990: Hummin' to Myself
- 1990: Peter and the Wolf
- 1992: Let No One Deceive You: Songs of Bertolt Brecht (Frankie Armstrong & Dave Van Ronk)
- 1994: To All My Friends in Far-Flung Places
- 1995: From... Another Time & Place
- 2001: Sweet & Lowdown

=== Live ===
- 1982: Your Basic Dave Van Ronk
- 1983: St James Infirmary (released in 1996 as Statesboro Blues)
- 1983: Dave Van Ronk in Rome
- 1997: Live at Sir George Williams University (recorded in 1967)
- 2004: Dave Van Ronk: ...and the tin pan bended and the story ended... (Smithsonian Folkways)
- 2008: On Air (1993)
- 2014: Live in Monterey (recorded in 1998)
- 2015: Hear Me Howl: Live 1964 (recorded Indiana University, Bloomington Indiana, October 20, 1964)

=== Compilation albums ===
- 1972: Van Ronk (includes Folksinger and Inside Dave Van Ronk in their entirety. Later released on CD as Inside Dave Van Ronk LP reissued in 2013)
- 1988: Hesitation Blues
- 1989: Inside Dave Van Ronk
- 1991: The Folkways Years, 1959–1961 (Smithsonian Folkways)
- 1992: A Chrestomathy
- 2002: Two Sides of Dave Van Ronk (includes all of In the Tradition and most of Your Basic Dave Van Ronk)
- 2005: The Mayor of MacDougal Street (previously unreleased material)
- 2012: Bluesmaster (includes all of Sings Ballads, Blues and a Spiritual and selections from Dave Van Ronk Sings)
- 2013: Down in Washington Square: The Smithsonian Folkways Collection (Smithsonian Folkways)

=== As guest ===
- 1958: Skiffle in Stereo (The Orange Blossom Jug Five)
- 1959: The Unfortunate Rake
- 1959: Fo'csle Songs and Shanties (by Paul Clayton) - Van Ronk sings on all songs.
- 1963: Newport Folk Festival 1963 The Evening Concerts Vol. 2
- 1964: Blues from Newport
- 1964: The Blues Project
- 1995: Life Lines, Peter, Paul and Mary,
- 1998: Other Voices, Too, Nanci Griffith
- 1999: The Man From God Knows Where, Tom Russell

=== Tributes ===
- 2005: Hotwalker, Tom Russell album including the tribute song, van Ronk about Dave Van Ronk
- 2007: Dave on Dave, David Massengill album tribute to Dave Van Ronk
- 2015: Redemption Road, Tom Paxton album including the tribute song, The Mayor of MacDougal Street about Dave Van Ronk

== Bibliography ==
Van Ronk was author of a posthumous memoir, The Mayor of MacDougal Street (2005) written with Elijah Wald. Anecdotes from the book were used as a source for the film Inside Llewyn Davis.

Van Ronk and Richard Ellington collected and edited The Bosses' Songbook: [32] Songs to Stifle the Flames of Discontent, Second Edition – A Collection of Modern Political Songs and Satire (Richard Ellington, publisher: New York, 1959).
