= Classic Country Music: A Smithsonian Collection =

Compilation album by various artists
- Released: 1990
- Recorded: (all selections previously released)
- Genre: Country
- Length: 294:28
- Label: BMG/Smithsonian Collection of Recordings
- Producer: Margaret Robinson

Various artists chronology
The Smithsonian Collection of Classic Country Music (1981)	Classic Country Music: A Smithsonian Collection (1990)

Professional ratings
Review scores
Source	Rating
Allmusic	(no review)

Classic Country Music: A Smithsonian Collection was a multi-volume set of recordings released by the Smithsonian Institution. Released in 1990, the collection contains 100 tracks deemed to be significantly important to the history of country music.

Classic Country Music was issued on either four compact discs, four cassette tapes or six vinyl albums. It also contained an illustrated 84-page book by Bill C. Malone, a country music historian. Malone's extensively annotated essay details country music's history era by era, from its beginnings in the 1920s and commercialization during the 1930s through its growing popularity during the 1980s.

Significant artists whose works were included were Waylon Jennings, Vernon Dalhart, Jimmie Rodgers, the Carter Family, Sons of the Pioneers, Bob Wills, Roy Acuff, Ernest Tubb, Eddy Arnold, Hank Williams, Johnny Cash, Kitty Wells, Loretta Lynn, Willie Nelson, George Jones, Alabama and The Judds. While many of country music's most important artists are included, notable artists whose works were absent – as acknowledged by Malone in his preface, because the artists chose not to participate – were Ray Charles, Merle Haggard, Reba McEntire, Linda Ronstadt, George Strait and Randy Travis.

This new collection replaced The Smithsonian Collection of Classic Country Music, an eight-volume, 143-track collection issued in 1981 (and whose liner notes were also written by Malone). The earlier set included many songs from the 1920s and 1930s, as well as bluegrass and other related genres to country music, and spanned the years 1922 to 1975.

== Track listing ==
Note: The track listing reflects the content of the compact discs. The sequencing is identical on the albums and cassettes, but different tracks may be on different volumes.

Disc 1
No.	Title	Artist(s)	Length
1.	"Soldier's Joy"	Gid Tanner and his Skillet Lickers	2:55
2.	"Jordan is a Hard Road to Travel"	Uncle Dave Macon and his Fruit Jar Drinkers	3:06
3.	"Barbara Allen"	Bradley Kincaid	3:20
4.	"The Prisoner's Song"	Vernon Dalhart	3:03
5.	"Wildwood Flower"	Carter Family	3:08
6.	"Waiting For a Train"	Jimmie Rodgers	2:43
7.	"Blue Yodel No. 8 (Muleskinner Blues)"	Jimmie Rodgers	2:59
8.	"Ragged But Right"	Riley Puckett	2:54
9.	"Can the Circle Be Unbroken"	Carter Family	3:07
10.	"That Silver-Haired Daddy of Mine"	Gene Autry and Jimmy Long	2:46
11.	"Just Because"	The Shelton Brothers	2:58
12.	"St. Louis Blues"	Milton Brown and his Brownies	3:21
13.	"My Mary"	W. Lee O'Daniel and his Light Crust Doughboys with Leon Huff	3:11
14.	"The Great Speckled Bird"	Roy Acuff and His Crazy Tennesseans	2:51
15.	"Under the Double Eagle"	Bill Boyd and his Cowboy Ramblers	2:48
16.	"I Want to Be a Cowboy's Sweetheart"	Patsy Montana and the Prairie Ramblers	3:08
17.	"South of the Border (Down Mexico Way)"	Gene Autry	2:48
18.	"Tumbling Tumbleweeds"	Sons of the Pioneers	3:11
19.	"Cool Water"	Sons of the Pioneers	2:41
20.	"Rye Whiskey"	Tex Ritter	3:08
21.	"Steel Guitar Rag"	Bob Wills and His Texas Playboys	2:48
22.	"New San Antonio Rose"	Bob Wills and His Texas Playboys	2:39
23.	"Walking the Floor Over You"	Ernest Tubb	2:35
24.	"Born to Lose"	Ted Daffan's Texans	2:42
25.	"You Are My Sunshine"	Jimmie Davis	2:48

Disc 2
No.	Title	Artist(s)	Length
1.	"Pistol Packin' Mama"	Al Dexter and His Troopers	2:46
2.	"There's a Star-Spangled Banner Waving Somewhere"	Elton Britt	2:39
3.	"The Cattle Call"	Eddy Arnold	3:05
4.	"Wabash Cannonball"	Roy Acuff and His Smoky Mountain Boys	2:36
5.	"Kentucky"	Blue Sky Boys	2:44
6.	"New Pretty Blonde (Jole Blonde)"	Moon Mullican and His Showboys	2:57
7.	"Philadelphia Lawyer"	Maddox Brothers and Rose	3:00
8.	"I Am a Pilgrim"	Merle Travis	2:48
9.	"It's Mighty Dark to Travel"	Bill Monroe and his Blue Grass Boys	2:52
10.	"Randy Lynn Rag"	Flatt & Scruggs and the Foggy Mountain Boys	2:04
11.	"Slipping Around"	Floyd Tillman	2:45
12.	"The Tramp on the Street"	Molly O'Day with the Cumberland Mountain Folks	2:48
13.	"I'm Moving On"	Hank Snow and His Rainbow Ranch Boys	2:53
14.	"Take an Old Cold Tater (and Wait)"	Little Jimmy Dickens	2:48
15.	"Tennessee Waltz"	Pee Wee King and His Golden West Cowboys (featuring Redd Stewart)	3:00
16.	"Peace in the Valley"	Red Foley	3:10
17.	"Lovesick Blues"	Hank Williams	2:42
18.	"Your Cheatin' Heart"	Hank Williams	2:41
19.	"I Love You a Thousand Ways"	Lefty Frizzell	2:43
20.	"The Wild Side of Life"	Hank Thompson and His Brazos Valley Boys	2:41
21.	"It Wasn't God Who Made Honky Tonk Angels"	Kitty Wells	2:30
22.	"Slowly"	Webb Pierce	2:31
23.	"Country Gentleman"	Chet Atkins	2:14
24.	"I Really Don't Want to Know"	Eddy Arnold	2:33
25.	"Sixteen Tons"	Tennessee Ernie Ford	2:34
26.	"Blue Moon of Kentucky"	Elvis Presley	2:03
27.	"Bye Bye Love"	The Everly Brothers	2:21

Disc 3
No.	Title	Artist(s)	Length
1.	"You Win Again"	Jerry Lee Lewis	2:53
2.	"Young Love"	Sonny James	2:31
3.	"I Walk the Line"	Johnny Cash	2:43
4.	"Crazy Arms"	Ray Price	2:33
5.	"He'll Have to Go"	Jim Reeves	2:18
6.	"Faded Love"	Patsy Cline	3:42
7.	"The Battle of New Orleans"	Johnny Horton	2:31
8.	"El Paso"	Marty Robbins	4:41
9.	"Big Bad John"	Jimmy Dean	3:01
10.	"When I Stop Dreaming"	Louvin Brothers	2:29
11.	"Detroit City"	Bobby Bare	2:47
12.	"We Must Have Been Out of Our Minds"	George Jones and Melba Montgomery	2:38
13.	"Excuse Me (I Think I've Got a Heartache)"	Buck Owens	2:25
14.	"Hello Walls"	Faron Young	2:20
15.	"Ode to Billie Joe"	Bobbie Gentry	4:12
16.	"King of the Road"	Roger Miller	2:26
17.	"Green Green Grass of Home"	Porter Wagoner	2:21
18.	"Funny How Time Slips Away"	Willie Nelson	2:37
19.	"Gentle on My Mind"	Glen Campbell	2:56
20.	"Rocky Top"	Osborne Brothers	2:33
21.	"Coal Miner's Daughter"	Loretta Lynn	2:58
22.	"Coat of Many Colors"	Dolly Parton	3:02
23.	"Folsom Prison Blues"	Johnny Cash	2:42
24.	"Stand By Your Man"	Tammy Wynette	2:39
25.	"Homecoming"	Tom T. Hall	3:17
26.	"Is Anybody Goin' to San Antone?"	Charley Pride	2:12

Disc 4
No.	Title	Artist(s)	Length
1.	"For the Good Times"	Ray Price	3:47
2.	"Sin City"	The Flying Burrito Brothers	4:10
3.	"After the Fire is Gone"	Conway Twitty and Loretta Lynn	2:36
4.	"I Never Go Around Mirrors"	Lefty Frizzell	2:32
5.	"Why Me"	Kris Kristofferson	3:27
6.	"The Grand Tour"	George Jones	3:05
7.	"Love Hurts"	Gram Parsons and Emmylou Harris	3:37
8.	"Bob Wills is Still the King"	Waylon Jennings	3:26
9.	"Who'll Turn Out the Lights"	Ronnie Milsap	3:18
10.	"Mamas Don't Let Your Babies Grow Up to Be Cowboys"	Waylon Jennings and Willie Nelson	2:28
11.	"'Til I Gain Control Again"	Rodney Crowell	5:04
12.	"Beneath Still Waters"	Emmylou Harris	3:41
13.	"The Devil Went Down to Georgia"	The Charlie Daniels Band	3:33
14.	"He Stopped Loving Her Today"	George Jones	3:12
15.	"Old Flame"	Alabama	3:11
16.	"40 Hour Week (For a Livin')"	Alabama	3:20
17.	"A Country Boy Can Survive"	Hank Williams Jr.	4:13
18.	"Don't Get Above Your Raisin'"	Ricky Skaggs	3:11
19.	"Honky Tonk Man"	Dwight Yoakam	2:46
20.	"Kids of the Baby Boom"	The Bellamy Brothers	3:24
21.	"9 to 5"	Dolly Parton	2:42
22.	"Grandpa (Tell Me 'Bout the Good Ol' Days)"	The Judds	4:12
