= Back Home (Merle Travis album) =

Compilation album by Merle Travis
- Released: 1957
- Recorded: 1945–1947
- Genre: Traditional, country, Americana
- Label: Capitol
- Producer: Lee Gillette

Merle Travis chronology
The Merle Travis Guitar (1956)	Back Home (1957)	Walkin' the Strings (1960)

Professional ratings
Review scores
Source	Rating
Allmusic	4.5/5 stars

Back Home is a compilation LP consisting of Merle Travis's album, Folk Songs of the Hills (1947), with four previously unreleased tracks. This album marked a new turn in Travis's career, bringing his Kentucky-style fingerpicking and down-home vocal style to the attention of a broad public of country and folk music enthusiasts at the onset of the American folk music revival. Together with another Capitol release the following year, The Merle Travis Guitar, it introduced the style of guitar playing that came to be known, in simplified form, as Travis picking. The album includes traditional country songs such as "John Henry", "Muskrat", "Lost John (from Bowling Green)", "Barbara Allen", and Travis's signature gospel song, "I Am a Pilgrim". Also included are the original compositions "Dark as a Dungeon" and "Sixteen Tons". All songs are introduced by a spoken narrative.

This was Travis's first LP featuring entirely acoustic guitar rather than electric. The cover shows a grist mill powered by a water wheel, a main source of energy "back home" before the arrival of electricity.

In his autobiography Johnny Cash says about this album: "If I had to answer that old but still interesting question, 'What music would you want with you if you were stranded on a desert island?', I'd say the Freewheelin' would have to be on the list. So would Merle Travis's Down Home, which has "Sixteen Tons" and all those other great songs on it and was the first country concept album (Ride This Train was the second)."

== Track listing ==
1. "Nine Pound Hammer" (Travis)
2. "John Henry" (Traditional)
3. "Sixteen Tons" (Travis)
4. "Dark as a Dungeon" (Travis)
5. "That's All" (Travis)
6. "Over by Number Nine" (Travis)
7. "I Am a Pilgrim" (Traditional)
8. "Muskrat" (Traditional)
9. "John Bolin" (Traditional)
10. "Possum up a Simmon Tree" (Traditional)
11. "Barbara Allen" (Traditional)
12. "Lost John (from Bowling Green)" (Traditional)

== Personnel ==
- Merle Travis – vocals and acoustic guitar
