= The Smithsonian Collection of Classic Country Music =

Compilation album by various artists
- Released: 1981
- Recorded: (all selections previously released)
- Genre: Country
- Label: Smithsonian Collection of Recordings
- Producer: Bill Bennett

Smithsonian Classic Country Music chronology
The Smithsonian Collection of Classic Country Music (1981)	Classic Country Music: A Smithsonian Collection (1990)

The Smithsonian Collection of Classic Country Music was a multi-volume set of recordings released by the Smithsonian Institution. Released in 1981, the collection contains 143 tracks deemed to be significantly important to the history of country music.

Classic Country Music was issued in eight volumes — either vinyl albums, cassette tapes or 8-track cartridges. It also contained an illustrated 56-page book by Bill C. Malone, a country music historian and professor of history at Tulane University. Malone's extensively annotated essay details country music's history era by era, from its beginnings in the 1920s and commercialization during the 1930s, and its evolution from the 1940s through the 1970s. Included are many songs from the 1920s and 1930s, as well as bluegrass and other related genres to country music.

Significant artists whose works were included were Vernon Dalhart, Jimmie Rodgers, the Carter Family, Sons of the Pioneers, Bob Wills, Roy Acuff, Ernest Tubb, Eddy Arnold, Hank Williams, Johnny Cash, Kitty Wells, Loretta Lynn, Merle Haggard, Willie Nelson and George Jones.

The collection is contained within a denim-covered box, with the collection's title emblazoned on the front.

This collection would be replaced by Classic Country Music: A Smithsonian Collection, a 100-track collection issued in 1990 (and whose liner notes were also written by Malone), and includes songs released through 1987.

== Track listing ==
Note: All volumes have 18 tracks unless otherwise stated.

=== Vol. 1 – The 1920s ===
- "Sallie Gooden" — Eck Robertson
- "The Little Old Log Cabin in the Lane" – Fiddlin' John Carson
- "Going Down the Lee Highway" – Grayson and Whitter
- "Jordan is a Hard Road to Travel" – Uncle Dave Macon and his Fruit Jar Drinkers
- "The Prisoner’s Song" – Vernon Dalhart
- "Goodbye Sweet Liza Jane" – Charlie Poole with the North Carolina Ramblers
- "Wreck of the Old 97" – Vernon Dalhart
- "Soldier’s Joy" – Gid Tanner and His Skillet Lickers
- "Where We'll Never Grow Old" – Smith's Sacred Singers
- "Shannon Waltz" – The East Texas Serenaders
- "Birmingham Jail" – Darby and Tarlton
- "Lady Gay" – Buell Kazee
- "The Fatal Wedding" – Bradley Kincaid
- "When the Work's All Done This Fall" – Carl T. Sprague
- "The Titanic" – Ernest Stoneman
- "Wildwood Flower" – Carter Family
- "Daddy and Home" – Jimmie Rodgers
- "Waiting For a Train" – Jimmie Rodgers

=== Vol. 2 – The 1930s Southeast ===
- "Mocking Bird" – Arthur Smith
- "Ragged But Right – Riley Puckett
- "Black Jack David" – Cliff Carlisle and His Buckle Busters
- "Pretty Polly" – Coon Creek Girls
- "Twenty One Years" – Mac and Bob
- "She's My Curley Headed Baby" – The Callahan Brothers
- "The East Bound Train" – The Blue Sky Boys
- "Brown's Ferry Blues" – The Delmore Brothers
- "What Would You Give In Exchange For Your Soul" – Monroe Brothers
- "Orange Blossom Special" – Rouse Brothers
- "Old Shep" – Red Foley
- "I'm Here to Get My Baby Out of Jail" – Karl and Harty
- "Remember Me (When the Candle Lights Are Gleaming)" – Lulu Belle and Scotty
- "Maple on the Hill" – J.E. Mainer's Mountaineers
- "The Last Letter" – Rex Griffin
- "The Great Speckled Bird" – Roy Acuff and His Crazy Tennesseans
- "The Precious Jewel" - Roy Acuff and His Smokey Mountain Boys
- "Can the Circle Be Unbroken (By and By)" – Carter Family

=== Vol. 3 – The 1930s Southwest ===
- "That Silver Haired Daddy of Mine" – Gene Autry and Jimmy Long
- "Tumbling Tumbleweeds" – Sons of the Pioneers
- "Cool Water" – Sons of the Pioneers
- "I Want to Be a Cowboy's Sweetheart" – Patsy Montana and the Prairie Ramblers
- "My Swiss Moonlight Lullaby" – Montana Slim
- "Texas Plains" – Stuart Hamblen and His Covered Wagon Jubilee
- "My Mary" – W. Lee O’Daniel and his Light Crust Doughboys with Leon Huff
- "Deep Elem Blues" – The Shelton Brothers
- "Nobody's Darlin' But Mine" – Jimmie Davis
- "Under the Double Eagle" – Bill 'Cowboy Rambler' Boyd and his Cowboy Ramblers
- "St. Louis Blues" – Milton Brown and his Brownies
- "Steel Guitar Rag" – Bob Wills and His Texas Playboys
- "Le Valse De Gueydan" – Leo Soileau and His Three Aces
- "Do Re Mi" – Woody Guthrie
- "Jesus Hold My Hand" – The Chuck Wagon Gang
- "It Makes No Difference Now" – Cliff Bruner's Texas Wanderers
- "New San Antonio Rose" – Bob Wills and His Texas Playboys
- "You Are My Sunshine" – Gene Autry

=== Vol. 4 – 1941-1953 (Part 1) ===
- "Walking the Floor Over You" – Ernest Tubb
- "When My Blue Moon Turns to Gold Again" – Wiley and Gene
- "Born to Lose" – Ted Daffan’s Texans
- "There's a Star-Spangled Banner Waving Somewhere" – Elton Britt
- "Pistol Packin' Mama" – Al Dexter and His Troopers
- "Have I Stayed Away Too Long?" – Tex Ritter and His Texans
- "Teardrops Falling in the Snow" – Molly O'Day and the Cumberland Mountain Folks
- "Oklahoma Hills" – Jack Guthrie and His Oklahomans
- "Dust on the Bible" – Bailes Brothers
- "Wabash Cannonball" – Roy Acuff and His Smoky Mountain Boys
- "I Am a Pilgrim" – Merle Travis
- "Rye Whiskey" – Tex Ritter
- "The Cattle Call" – Eddy Arnold
- "Smoke! Smoke! Smoke! (That Cigarette)" – Tex Williams and His Western Caravan
- "What About You?" – Johnny and Jack and Their Tennessee Mountain Boys
- "Take an Old Cold Tater (and Wait)" – Little Jimmy Dickens
- "Philadelphia Lawyer" – Maddox Brothers and Rose
- "Peace in the Valley" – Red Foley

=== Vol. 5 – 1941-1953 (Part 2) ===
- "Eight More Miles to Louisville" – Grandpa Jones
- "Filipino Baby" – Cowboy Copas
- "Kentucky" – Blue Sky Boys
- "New Pretty Blonde (Jole Blonde)" – Moon Mullican and His Showboys
- "Bandera Waltz" – Slim Whitman
- "I'm Moving On" – Hank Snow and His Rainbow Ranch Boys
- "I Love You Because" – Leon Payne
- "Tennessee Waltz" – Pee Wee King and His Golden West Cowboys (featuring Redd Stewart)
- "The Tramp on the Street" – Molly O'Day with the Cumberland Mountain Folks
- "Satisfied" – Martha Carson
- "Slippin' Around" – Floyd Tillman
- "I Love You a Thousand Ways" – Lefty Frizzell
- "Darlin' Am I the One?" – Carl Smith
- "The Wild Side of Life" – Hank Thompson and His Brazos Valley Boys
- "It Wasn't God Who Made Honky Tonk Angels" – Kitty Wells
- "Thirty Pieces of Silver" – Wilma Lee and Stoney Cooper
- "I'm So Lonesome I Could Cry" – Hank Williams and His Drifting Cowboys
- "Lovesick Blues" – Hank Williams and His Drifting Cowboys

=== Vol. 6 – 1953-1963 ===
- "There Stands the Glass" – Webb Pierce
- "I Walk the Line" – Johnny Cash
- "Sixteen Tons" – Tennessee Ernie Ford
- "Down in the Willow Garden" – Everly Brothers
- "Country Gentleman" – Chet Atkins
- "He'll Have to Go" – Jim Reeves
- "Crazy Arms" – Ray Price
- "Fraulein" – Bobby Helms
- "City Lights" – Ray Price
- "When I Stop Dreaming" – Louvin Brothers
- "The Battle of New Orleans" – Johnny Horton
- "Long Black Veil" – Lefty Frizzell
- "El Paso" – Marty Robbins
- "The Knoxville Girl" – Louvin Brothers
- "Louisiana Man" – Rusty and Doug
- "Faded Love" – Patsy Cline
- "Excuse Me (I Think I've Got a Heartache)" – Buck Owens
- "We Must Have Been Out of Our Minds" – George Jones and Melba Montgomery

=== Vol. 7 – Bluegrass ===
- "Mule Skinner Blues" – Bill Monroe and His Blue Grass Boys
- "It’s Mighty Dark to Travel" – Bill Monroe and His Blue Grass Boys
- "Earl's Breakdown" – Flatt and Scruggs
- "The Lonesome River" – The Stanley Brothers
- "Dreaming of a Little Cabin" – Mac Wiseman
- "Are You Missing Me" – Jim & Jesse and The Virginia Boys
- "Rocky Top" – Osborne Brothers
- "Mary Dear" – Bill Clifton and His Dixie Mountain Boys
- "I'm Using My Bible for a Roadmap" - Reno and Smiley
- "John Henry" – The Lilly Brothers
- "I'll Be All Smiles Tonight" – Hylo Brown
- "Sunny Side of the Mountain" – Jimmy Martin and the Sunny Mountain Boys
- "Jerusalem Ridge" – Kenny Baker
- "Black Mountain Rag" – Doc Watson
- "The Legend of the Rebel Soldier" – Charlie Moore and The Dixie Partners
- "Four Strong Winds" – Cliff Waldron and the New Shades of Grass
- "Two Little Boys" – The Country Gentlemen
- "Bottom of the Glass" – The Seldom Scene

=== Vol. 8 – 1963-1975 (17 tracks) ===
- "Six Days on the Road" – Dave Dudley
- "Detroit City" – Bobby Bare
- "Green, Green Grass of Home" – Porter Wagoner
- "King of the Road" – Roger Miller
- "Is Anybody Goin' to San Antone" – Charley Pride
- "Homecoming" – Tom T. Hall
- "Coat of Many Colors" – Dolly Parton
- "Hungry Eyes" – Merle Haggard and the Strangers
- "Mama Tried" – Merle Haggard and the Strangers
- "Waltz Across Texas" – Ernest Tubb
- "Coal Miner's Daughter" – Loretta Lynn
- "D-I-V-O-R-C-E" – Tammy Wynette
- "The Grand Tour" – George Jones
- "It Was Always So Easy (To Find an Unhappy Woman)" – Moe Bandy
- "Sin City" – Flying Burrito Brothers
- "Funny How Time Slips Away" – Willie Nelson
- "Blue Eyes Crying in the Rain" – Willie Nelson
