= Will the Circle Be Unbroken (album) =

Studio album by Nitty Gritty Dirt Band
- Released: November 1972
- Recorded: August 1971
- Studio: Woodland (Nashville, Tennessee)
- Genre: Bluegrass; traditional country; Appalachian folk music; gospel
- Length: 109:02; 120:02 (2002 reissue)
- Label: United Artists
- Producer: William McEuen

Nitty Gritty Dirt Band chronology
All the Good Times (1971)	Will the Circle Be Unbroken (1972)	Stars & Stripes Forever (1974)

Professional ratings
Review scores
Source	Rating
AllMusic	5/5 stars
Christgau's Record Guide	A−

Will the Circle Be Unbroken is the seventh studio album by American country music group the Nitty Gritty Dirt Band, released in November 1972, through United Artists Records. The album was a collaboration with many famous bluegrass and country-and-western players, including Roy Acuff, "Mother" Maybelle Carter, Doc Watson, Earl Scruggs, Randy Scruggs, Merle Travis, Pete "Oswald" Kirby, Norman Blake, Jimmy Martin, and others. It also introduced fiddler Vassar Clements to a wider audience.

The album was considered a breakthrough in bridging generational and musical differences between the old guard of Nashville, Tennessee, and the younger country rock movement. Will the Circle Be Unbroken reached number 4 on Billboard's Top Country Albums chart, and was eventually certified platinum for selling over one million copies. The Nitty Gritty Dirt Band released two follow-up albums in 1989 and 2002.

== History ==
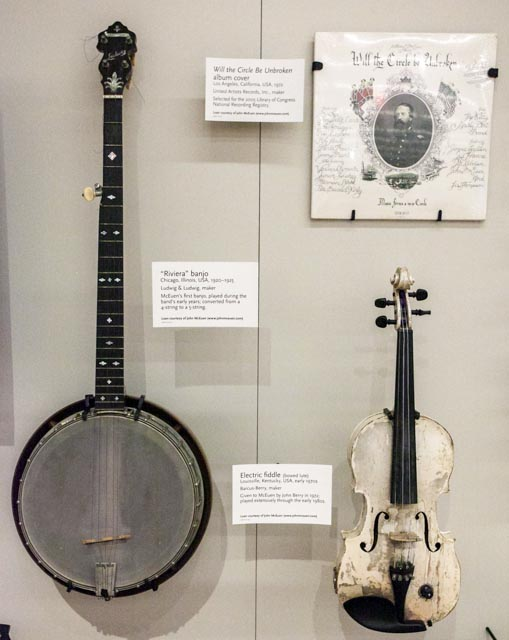
John McEuen's banjo and electric fiddle displayed alongside a copy of Will the Circle Be Unbroken at the Musical Instrument Museum (Phoenix).

The album's title comes from a song by Ada R. Habershon (re-arranged by A. P. Carter) and reflects how the Nitty Gritty Dirt Band was trying to tie together two generations of musicians. Nitty Gritty Dirt Band was a young country-rock band with a hippie look, described by Acuff as "a bunch of long-haired West Coast boys". The other players were much older and more famous from the 1940s, 1950s and 1960s, primarily as old-time country and bluegrass players. Many had become known to their generation through the Grand Ole Opry. However, with the rise of rock and roll, the emergence of the commercial country's slick "Nashville sound", and changing tastes in music, their popularity had waned somewhat from their glory years.

Acuff was initially contemptuous of the project, but later relented and participated. The record includes the first meeting of Doc Watson and Merle Travis, after whom Watson's son, Merle, was named. Bill Monroe, sixty years old at the time, refused to participate in the recordings.

The album was recorded at Woodland Sound Studios in Nashville, Tennessee. Every track on the album was recorded on the first or second take straight to two-track masters, so the takes are raw and unprocessed. Additionally, another tape ran continuously throughout the entire week-long recording session and captured the dialog between the players. On the final album, many of the tracks—including the first track—begin with the musicians discussing how to perform the song or who should come in where in any given portion of a song.

The album cover features an image of Union Admiral David Dixon Porter. Originally appearing in 1972 as a three LP album and three-cassette tape offering, Will the Circle Be Unbroken was remastered and re-released in 2002 as a two compact disc set. The original album was certified platinum by the RIAA on November 6, 1997, indicating shipments of 500,000 copies. It has sold 301,600 copies as of October 2019.

Much later, the Nitty Gritty Dirt Band recorded two subsequent albums, Will the Circle Be Unbroken: Volume Two and Will the Circle Be Unbroken, Volume III, in an attempt to repeat the process with other historically significant musicians. Volume Two won the Country Music Association's 1989 Album of the Year as well as three Grammys. In 1990, the album was celebrated on the PBS music television program Austin City Limits, which featured a performance by the full ensemble of guests on the Carter Family song "Will the Circle Be Unbroken", from the original 1972 album.

== Track listing ==
=== Disc one ===
1. "Grand Ole Opry Song" (Hylo Brown) – 2:59
  - Jimmy Martin-Lead vocal and guitar, John McEuen-Banjo, Vassar Clements-Fiddle, Les Thompson-Mandolin, Roy "Junior" Huskey-Bass; Jeff Hanna, Gary Scruggs, Jim Ibbotson, Thompson, Ray Martin-Background vocals
2. "Keep on the Sunny Side" (A.P. Carter, Gary Garett) – 3:35
  - Mother Maybelle Carter-Lead vocal and guitar, Doc Watson-Guitar, Pete "Oswald" Kirby-Dobro, Huskey-Bass, Earl Scruggs-Banjo, Randy Scruggs-Autoharp, McEuen-Mandolin; Hanna, Thompson, Merle Travis, Ibbotson, Watson, Gary Scruggs-Background vocals.
3. "Nashville Blues" (Earl Scruggs) – 3:10
  - Earl Scruggs-Lead banjo, McEuen-Banjo, Hanna-Washboard, Jimmie Fadden-Harmonica, Clements-Fiddle, Randy Scruggs-Guitar, Norman Blake-Dobro, Huskey-Bass
4. "You Are My Flower" (A.P. Carter) – 3:35
  - McEuen-Banjo, Earl Scruggs-Guitar, Blake-Dobro, Fadden-Autoharp, Ibbotson-Snare, Huskey-Bass, Randy Scruggs-Guitar; Hanna, Thompson, Randy Scruggs-Background vocals
5. "The Precious Jewel" (Roy Acuff) – 3:30
  - Roy Acuff-Lead Vocal, McEuen-Banjo, Fadden-Harmonica, Thompson-Mandolin, Earl Scruggs-Guitar, Randy Scruggs-Autoharp, Clements-Fiddle, Huskey-Bass, Kirby-Dobro
6. "Dark as a Dungeon" (Merle Travis) – 2:45
  - Travis-Lead vocal and guitar, McEuen-Mandolin, Fadden-Harmonica, Huskey-Bass; Hanna, Thompson, Ibbotson-Background vocals
7. "Tennessee Stud" (Jimmie Driftwood) – 4:22
  - Watson-Lead vocal and guitar, McEuen-Banjo, Fadden-Harmonica, Ibbotson-Guitar, Huskey-Bass, Clements-Fiddle, Hanna-Background vocal
8. "Black Mountain Rag" (traditional; credited to Thomas Magness on the album) – 2:10
  - Watson-Lead guitar, McEuen-Banjo, Ibbotson-guitar, Thompson-Mandolin, Fadden-Harmonica Clements-Fiddle, Huskey-Bass
9. "Wreck on the Highway" (Dorsey Dixon) – 3:24
  - Acuff-Lead Vocal, Fadden-Harmonica, Thompson-Mandolin, Kirby-Dobro, Earl Scruggs-Guitar, Clements-Fiddle, Huskey-Bass
10. "The End of the World" (Fred Rose) – 3:53
  - Oswald-Dobro, Watson-Guitar, Earl Scruggs-Guitar, Huskey-Bass
11. "I Saw the Light" (Hank Williams) – 3:45
  - Acuff-Lead Vocal, Earl Scruggs-Banjo, Fadden-Harmonica, McEuen-Mandolin, Watson-Guitar, Kirby-Dobro, Clements-Fiddle, Randy Scruggs-Autoharp, Huskey-Bass; Hanna, Thompson, Ibbotson, Martin-Background Vocals
12. "Sunny Side of the Mountain" (Byron Gregory, Harry McAuliffe) – 2:14
  - Martin-Lead Vocal and Guitar, McEuen-Banjo, Thompson-Mandolin, Fadden-Harmonica, Ibottson-Snare, Clements-Fiddle, Huskey-Bass; Hanna, Thompson, Gary Scruggs, Ray Martin-Background Vocals
13. "Nine-Pound Hammer" (Merle Travis) – 2:14
  - Travis-Lead Vocal and Guitar, McEuen-Banjo, Fadden-Harmonica, Ibbotson-Snare, Huskey-Bass; Hanna, Ibbotson, Thompson-Background Vocals
14. "Losin' You (Might Be the Best Thing Yet)" (Edria A. Humphrey, Jimmy Martin) – 2:44
  - Martin-Lead Vocal and Guitar, McEuen-Banjo, Fadden-Harmonica, Thompson-Mandolin, Ibbotson-Snare, Clements-Fiddle, Huskey-Bass
15. "Honky Tonkin'" (Hank Williams) – 2:19
  - Fadden-Lead Vocal, Hanna-Guitar, Blake-Dobro, Clements-Lead Guitar and Fiddle, Thompson-Mandolin, Huskey-Bass, Ibbotson-Drums
16. "You Don't Know My Mind" (Jimmie Skinner) – 2:45
  - Martin-Lead Vocal and Guitar, McEuen-Banjo, Thompson-Mandolin, Fadden-Harmonica, Ibbotson-Drums, Huskey-Bass, Clements-Fiddle; Hanna, Thompson, Gary Scruggs, Ray Martin-Background Vocals
17. "My Walkin' Shoes" (Jimmy Martin, Paul Williams) – 2:02
  - Martin-Lead Vocal and Guitar, McEuen-Banjo, Thompson-Mandolin, Fadden-Harmonica, Ibottson-Snare, Clements-Fiddle, Huskey-Bass; Hanna, Thompson, Gary Scruggs, Ray Martin-Background Vocals

=== Disc two ===
1. "Lonesome Fiddle Blues" (Vassar Clements) – 2:41
  - Clements-Fiddle, McEuen-Banjo, Ibbotson-Guitar, Fadden-Harmonica, Hanna-Washboard, Thompson-Mandolin, Randy Scruggs-Guitar, Ellis Padget-Bass
2. "Cannonball Rag" (Merle Travis) – 1:15
  - Travis-Guitar, Huskey-Bass
3. "Avalanche" (Millie Clements) – 2:50
  - Clements-Fiddle, McEuen-Banjo, Ibbotson-Guitar, Hanna-Washboard, Thompson-Mandolin, Fadden-Harmonica, Huskey-Bass
4. "Flint Hill Special" (Earl Scruggs) – 2:12
  - Earl Scruggs-Banjo, Fadden-Harmonica, Thompson-Mandolin, Gary Scruggs-Guitar, Blake-Dobro, Clements-Fiddle, Ibbotson-Snare, Huskey-Bass
5. "Togary Mountain" (Walter McEuen) – 2:25
  - McEuen-Banjo, Ibbotson-Guitar, Thompson-Mandolin, Blake-Dobro, Clements-Fiddle, Huskey-Bass
6. "Earl's Breakdown" (Earl Scruggs) – 2:34
  - Earl Scruggs-Banjo, Randy Scruggs-Guitar, Clements-Fiddle, Thompson-Mandolin, Ibbotson-Snare, Huskey-Bass
7. "Orange Blossom Special" (Ervin T. Rouse) – 2:14
  - Clements-Fiddle, McEuen-Banjo, Thompson-Mandolin, Martin-Guitar, Ibbotson-Snare, Randy Scruggs-Guitar, Padgett-Bass
8. "Wabash Cannonball" (A.P. Carter) – 2:00
  - Kirby-Dobro, Fadden-Harmonica, Watson-Guitar, Huskey-Bass, Earl Scruggs-Guitar
9. "Lost Highway" (Leon Payne) – 3:37
  - Ibbotson-Lead Vocal and Guitar, Thompson-Mandolin, Hanna-Drums, Clements-Fiddle, Blake-Dobro, Huskey-Bass, McEuen-Banjo
10. Doc Watson & Merle Travis First Meeting (Dialogue) – 1:52
11. "Way Downtown" (traditional, Doc Watson) – 3:30
  - Watson-Lead Vocal and Guitar, McEuen-Banjo, Thompson-Mandolin, Ibbotson-Guitar, Fadden-Harmonica, Clements-Fiddle, Huskey-Bass, Hanna-Background Vocal
12. "Down Yonder" (arr. Doc Watson) – 1:48
  - Watson-Guitar, McEuen-Banjo, Ibbotson-Guitar, Fadden-Harmonica, Thompson-Mandolin, Hanna-Washboard, Clements-Fiddle, Huskey-Bass
13. "Pins and Needles (In My Heart)" (Floyd Jenkins) – 2:53
  - Acuff-Lead Vocal, Kirby-Dobro, Fadden-Harmonica, Thompson-Mandolin, McEuen-Banjo, Earl Scruggs-Guitar, Clements-FIddle, Ibbotson-Snare, Huskey-Bass
14. "Honky Tonk Blues" (Hank Williams) – 2:22
  - Hanna-Lead Vocal, Bill McEuen-Guitar, Ibbotson-Drums, Blake-Dobro, Clements-Fiddle, Huskey-Bass
15. "Sailin' on to Hawaii" (Beecher Kirby) – 2:00
  - Kirby-Dobro, Watson-Guitar, Scruggs-Guitar, Huskey-Bass
16. "I'm Thinking Tonight of My Blue Eyes" (A.P. Carter) – 4:25
  - Carter-Lead Vocal and Guitar, Earl Scruggs-Banjo, McEuen-Mandolin, Travis, Guitar, Kirby-Dobro, Clements-Fiddle, Huskey-Bass; Hanna, Thompson, Ibbotson, Randy Scruggs-Background Vocals
17. "I am a Pilgrim" (traditional) – 2:55
  - Travis-Lead Vocal and Guitar, Fadden-Harmonica, Ibbotson-Snare, Huskey-Bass
18. "Wildwood Flower" (A.P. Carter) – 3:34
  - Carter-Lead Vocal and Autoharp, Earl Scruggs-Guitar, Ibbotson-Guitar, Thompson-Mandolin, Huskey-Bass
19. "Soldier's Joy" (John McEuen, Earl Scruggs) – 2:05
  - Earl Scruggs-Banjo, McEuen-Uncle Dave Macon's Banjo
20. "Will the Circle Be Unbroken" (A.P. Carter) – 4:50
  - Carter-Lead Vocal (first and fourth verses) and Autoharp, Earl Scruggs-Banjo, Watson-Guitar, Fadden-Harmonica, Travis-Guitar, McEuen-Mandolin, Martin-Lead Vocal (second verse) Guitar, Kirby-Dobro, Clements-Fiddle, Huskey-Bass, Acuff-Lead Vocal (third verse); Watson, Hanna, Ibbotson, Thompson, Gary Scruggs, Ray Martin, Timmy Martin, Randy Scruggs, Betty Travis, Fred Cross, Gloria Belle, Louise Scruggs, Steve Scruggs, Chet Flippo, Martha Flippo, Larry Murray, Mike Carr, Alice McEuen-Background Vocals
21. "Both Sides Now" (Joni Mitchell) – 2:19
  - Randy Scruggs-Guitar
  - 2002 Reissue bonus tracks
22. "Foggy Mountain Breakdown" (Earl Scruggs) – 2:39
23. Warming Up for "The Opry" – 2:43
24. Sunny Side – 4:06
25. "Remember Me" (Scotty Wiseman) – 1:32
