= Merle Travis the Guitar Player =

LP Album

Jimmy Wakely Presents: Merle Travis the Guitar Player is an LP album by Merle Travis and Jimmy Wakely from 1976 on the Shasta label. The songs were recorded for Jimmy Wakely's CBS Radio Shows in the 50s with the exception of track 4, "Bye Bye Blues", which was recorded in 1976. The style of the music is more western than honky-tonk.

In 2002 Varèse Sarabande released a CD version titled Merle Travis - The Very Best; omitting the Kentucky Waltz and adding the medley: No Vacancy/Smoke! Smoke! Smoke! (That Cigarette)/I'll See You In My Dreams/Sixteen Tons.

== Track listing ==
=== Side One ===
1. "Kentucky Waltz" (vocals by Jimmy Wakely) - 2:15
2. "Texas Tornado" (Instrumental) - 1:50
3. "Follow Through" - 1:44
4. "Bye Bye Blues" - 1:24 (Instrumental)
5. "Hominy Grits" - 2:50
6. "Song of the Steamboat The Three Rays" - 2:20
7. "Gambler's Guitar" - 2:49

=== Side Two ===
1. "John Henry" - 2:40
2. "I'll See You In My Dreams" (Instrumental) - 1:38
3. "Guitar Rag" (with vocals) - 1:50
4. "Interview and 16 Tons" - 6:34
5. "Nobody" - 3:35
