= Walkin' the Strings =

Studio album by Merle Travis
- Released: 1960
- Genre: Folk, blues, country, gospel, traditional, Americana
- Label: Capitol
- Producer: Cliffie Stone, Ken Nelson

Merle Travis chronology
Back Home (1957)	Walkin' the Strings (1960)	Travis (1962)

Professional ratings
Review scores
Source	Rating
Allmusic	4.5/5 stars

Walkin' the Strings was the first solo acoustic guitar album by Merle Travis, released in 1960 but recorded in the late 1940s and early 1950s, when Travis was at the peak of his performing abilities. It is widely regarded as one of Travis's finest musical achievements.

== History ==
Travis began playing solo guitar numbers on his radio shows as early as the late 1930s, but it was only in the mid-1940s that Travis began using his Martin D-28 acoustic guitar to record various vocals and instrumental numbers for Capitol's Electrical Transcriptions series. These recordings were originally intended for radio broadcast. Capitol's A & R executive, Lee Gillette, wanted instrumentals of varying lengths and would ask Travis to play something for a specific amount of time, typically quite short; the shortest of the numbers included on this album, "Travis Trot", lasts just 29 seconds. (The vocal numbers were of standard length.) The instrumentals could thus be used as fillers and breaks between program segments. The performances were unrehearsed, and it was said that Travis could start and stop anywhere he chose in order to meet the time constraints.

Keeping his eye on the clock as he played, Travis drew on his rich repertoire of Muhlenberg County guitar licks, blues, old standards and gospel songs. Some songs were untitled when they were recorded and were only given titles by Capitol later. These songs were still lying in the vaults when Travis' fame as a guitarist began to reach a wider public in the 1950s. Following an initial instrumental album played on electric guitar, The Merle Travis Guitar (Capitol 1956), the radio transcriptions were collected and published as the present LP album in 1960 (the cover bizarrely shows Travis in Country and Western gear holding his custom-built Gibson electric guitar, rather than the Martin acoustic he actually used in these recordings). Rich Kienzle recounts the following anecdote: "Shortly after the album's original release, a fan asked Merle who was performing at a small club to play "Pigmeat Stomp". Travis was surprised, having never heard the title, not realizing that it was one that Capitol had assigned. The fan insisted he had it on a record. Only when he showed Merle a copy of Walkin' the Strings, an LP he'd never seen, did Merle realize that these were the transcriptions he'd recorded a decade ago."

Most of the numbers on this album, including "Saturday Night Shuffle", "Blue Bell", "Cane Break Blues", "Cannonball Stomp" (better known as "Cannonball Rag"), and the title song, have come to be regarded as classic examples of so-called Travis picking. In his liner notes to the 1996 reissue on CD, Chet Atkins states: "This collection is just the very best you will ever hear of Merle Travis."

== Track listing ==
All songs are credited to Merle Travis except as indicated

1. "Walkin' the Strings"
2. "Little David Play on Your Harp" (with vocal)
3. "Saturday Night Shuffle"
4. "Thumbing the Bass"
5. "Cane Break Blues"
6. "Darby's Ram" (with vocal)
7. "Everly Rag"
8. "Rose Time"
9. "Old Aunt Dinah"
10. "Old Kentucky Home" (Stephen Foster)
11. "Pigmeat Stomp"
12. "Blue Smoke"
13. "Dry Bread" (with vocal)
14. "Louisville Clog"
15. "On a Bicycle Built for Two" (Harry Dacre)
16. "Green Bay Polka"
17. "Jordan Am a Hard Road to Travel" (Daniel Emmett) (with vocal)
18. "Travis Trot"
19. "Cannon Ball Stomp"
20. "Fuller Blues"
21. "Blue Bell" (Edward Madden, Theodore Morse)
22. "Take My Hand, Precious Lord" (Thomas A. Dorsey) (with vocal)

== Personnel ==
- Merle Travis - acoustic guitar and vocals
