= Kennedy Jones =

Kennedy Jones may refer to:

- Kennedy Jones (journalist) (1865–1921), British journalist, editor, newspaper manager, and Member of Parliament
- Kennedy Jones (musician) (1900–1990), American guitarist and music writer
