= Big Bluegrass Special =

Studio album by Glen Campbell and The Green River Boys
- Released: November 1962
- Recorded: Capitol (Hollywood)
- Genre: Country
- Length: 32:57
- Label: Capitol
- Producer: Nick Venet

Glen Campbell chronology
Big Bluegrass Special (1962)	Too Late to Worry – Too Blue to Cry (1963)

Professional ratings
Review scores
Source	Rating
AllMusic	link

Big Bluegrass Special is the debut studio album by American singer-guitarist Glen Campbell and the Green River Boys, released in 1962 by Capitol Records.

== Track listing ==
Side 1

1. "Truck Driving Man" (Terry Fell) – 2:00
2. "There's More Pretty Girls Than One" (Alton Delmore, Arthur Smith) – 2:55
3. "Weary Lonesome Blues" (Delmore) – 2:15
4. "No Vacancy" (Merle Travis, Cliffie Stone) – 2:20
5. "Rainin' on the Mountain" (Delmore) – 2:22
6. "Kentucky Means Paradise" (Travis) – 2:35

Side 2

1. "Brown's Ferry Blues" (Delmore) – 2:33
2. "Lonesome Jailhouse Blues" (Delmore, Rabon Delmore) – 1:32
3. "One Hundred Miles Away from Home" (Jerry Capehart, Glen Campbell, Nick Venet) – 3:10
4. "This Old White Mule of Mine" (Bob Nolan) – 2:00
5. "Poor Boy Lookin' for A Home" (Melvin Schmidt) – 2:10
6. "Long Black Limousine" (Vern Stovall, Bobby George) – 3:00

== Personnel ==
- Glen Campbell – vocals, acoustic guitar
- James Burton – acoustic guitar
- Dale Fitzsimmons – banjo
- David Frost – drums
- Joe Osborn – bass guitar
- Carl Tandberg – double bass

== Charts ==
Album - Billboard (United States)
Big Bluegrass Special did not chart.

Singles - Billboard (United States)

Year	Single	Hot Country Singles	Hot 100	Easy Listening
1962	"Kentucky Means Paradise"	20	114	-

== Release history ==
The 1996 CD reissue of Big Bluegrass Special included the bonus tracks "Divorce Me C.O.D" and "Dark As A Dungeon".
