= Muskrat (song) =

Single by The Everly Brothers

from the album Both Sides of an Evening
- A-side: "Don't Blame Me"
- Released: September 2, 1961
- Genre: Rock and roll
- Length: 2:18
- Label: Warner Bros. 5501
- Songwriter(s): Merle Travis, Tex Ann, Harold Hensley
- Producer(s): Andrew Sandoval

The Everly Brothers singles chronology
"Temptation" (May 12, 1961)	"Muskrat" (1961)	"Crying in the Rain" (December 22, 1962)

"Muskrat" is a song written by Merle Travis, Tex Ann, and Harold Hensley and released by Travis on his 1947 album Folk Songs of the Hills (which was reissued in 1957 as Back Home).

It was covered by The Everly Brothers in 1961, reaching No. 20 on the UK Singles Chart and No. 82 on the U.S. pop chart. It also featured on their 1961 album, Both Sides of an Evening.

== Other versions ==
- The Shakin' Pyramids released a version of the song on their 1981 EP Tennessee Rock 'N' Roll.
