= Too Late to Worry – Too Blue to Cry =

Studio album by Glen Campbell
- Released: April 1963
- Recorded: Capitol (Hollywood)
- Genre: Country
- Length: 29:22
- Label: Capitol
- Producer: Nick Venet

Glen Campbell chronology
Big Bluegrass Special (1962)	Too Late to Worry – Too Blue to Cry (1963)	The Astounding 12-String Guitar of Glen Campbell (1964)

Too Late to Worry – Too Blue to Cry is the second studio album by American singer-guitarist Glen Campbell, released in 1963 by Capitol Records.

== Track listing ==
Side 1

1. "Walking the Floor Over You" (Ernest Tubb) – 2:30
2. "I'll Hold You in My Heart" (Eddy Arnold, Hall Horton, Tommy Dilbeck) – 2:45
3. "Be Honest with Me" (Gene Autry, Fred Rose) – 2:35
4. "Oh My Darlin'" (Traditional; arranged by Glen Campbell and Jerry Capehart) – 2:45
5. "Tomorrow Never Comes" (Ernest Tubb, Johnny Bond) – 2:25
6. "Too Late to Worry – Too Blue to Cry" (Al Dexter) – 2:30

Side 2

1. "Here I Am" (Glen Campbell, Mark Douglas) – 2:25
2. "I Hang My Head and Cry" (Gene Autry, Fred Rose, Ray Whitley) – 2:27
3. "When You Cry, You Cry Alone" (Wesley Tuttle, Merle Travis, Tex Atchison) – 2:20
4. "How Do I Tell My Heart Not to Break" (Jerry Capehart, Glen Campbell) – 2:15
5. "It's Been So Long Darlin'" (Ernest Tubb) – 2:30
6. "Long Black Limousine" (Vern Stovall, Bobby George) – 2:15

== Personnel ==
Music

- Glen Campbell – vocals, acoustic guitar
- Carl Tandberg – bass
- Allen Reuss – acoustic guitar
- Donald Frost – drums

Production

- Nick Venet – producer
- Jimmie Haskell – arranger, conductor
- Ken Veeder/Capitol Photo Studio – photography

== Charts ==
Singles – Billboard (United States)

Year	Single	Hot Country Singles	Hot 100	Easy Listening
1963	"Too Late to Worry – Too Blue to Cry"	—	76	—
