= Arnold Shultz =

American fiddler and guitarist (1886–1931)

Arnold Schultz

Arnold Shultz (1886–1931) was an American fiddler and guitarist who is noted as a major influence in the development of the "thumb-style," or "Travis picking" method of playing guitar.

== Biography ==
Shultz, the son of a former slave, was born into a family of touring musicians in Ohio County, Kentucky, in 1886. The community he grew up around was musically active. Ella Griffin, his cousin, says "He learned [music] at home. He just picked it up himself, It just runs in the family." In 1900, Shultz began studying guitar under his uncle, developing a jazzy "thumb-style" method of playing guitar that eventually evolved into the Kentucky style for which such musicians as Chet Atkins, Doc Watson and Merle Travis would be known. Professionally, Shultz was a laborer, traveling from Kentucky through Mississippi and New Orleans, working with coal or as a deck hand.

In the early 1920s, he played fiddle in the otherwise white hillbilly and Dixieland band of Forest "Boots" Faught. To the occasional complaints this brought (objections like "You've got a colored fiddle. We don't want that!"), Faught would simply reply, "I've got the man because he's a good musician." Yet, Blacks playing for whites was not a rare thing in some places, such as Ohio County. Shultz himself was especially liked because of his musical ability. “Arnold was always welcome in the best of white homes," says Faught. Shultz would also play guitar for the band and Faught would say "He was the first man I ever heard to play the lead on a guitar." They would often play in a one-room schoolhouse that had been turned into a tavern where illegal alcohol was available. During Prohibition times, he narrowly avoided arrest when running from "five federal prohibition officers." Shultz, along with "Did" Crumpton and "Bud" Walker were found with a one quart bottle and some smaller bottles of white liquor in their vehicle. They were turned over to federal authorities yet there are no records of the case. It is believed they got off because their vehicle could not be searched without a warrant. Nonetheless, Shultz was shaken up, "during the next few years, he could be found in or near the quiet villages of Horton and Rosine, much to the benefit of Bill Monroe."

Shultz also played with Charlie Monroe and gave Bill Monroe the opportunity to play his first paid musical gig, joining at a square dance with Shultz playing fiddle and Monroe on guitar.

== Influence ==
Though he was not recorded, his blues playing made a powerful influence. Bill Monroe, who was formative in the development of bluegrass music, has openly cited Shultz as an influence on his playing. Bill recalled that “him and two other colored men come there to Rosine to play for the dance” and “they had a guitar, banjo, and fiddle. Arnold played the guitar.” "Bill was awestruck."

Shultz taught his guitar methods to Kennedy Jones, who disseminated the "thumb-style" methods further. His methods were passed down further to Merle Travis and Ike Everly.

Schultz died on April 14, 1931 of a heart problem, a mitral lesion, though legends have persisted that he died as a result of poisoning by a white musician who was jealous of him. Less colorful reports indicate that he suffered a stroke while boarding a bus. Arnold Schultz died in Butler County, Kentucky, near the small city of Morgantown. He is buried in the town's African American cemetery.

== Legacy ==
The IBMA Foundation established the Arnold Shultz Fund in 2020 to support activities increasing the participation of people of color in bluegrass music. The Arnold Shultz Fund project grants are awarded every year in the spring. Members of the Arnold Shultz Fund Advisory Committee include co-chairs Richard Brown and Neil Rosenberg, with Erika Brady, Sav Sankaran, Trisha Tubbs, and Lily Werbin.

Shultz was inducted into the International Bluegrass Music Hall of Fame in 2025.

== Sources ==
- Cantwell, Robert (2003). Bluegrass Breakdown: The Making of the Old Southern Sound. University of Illinois Press. ISBN 0-252-07117-4.
- Kingsbury, Paul (1998). The Encyclopedia of Country Music: The Ultimate Guide to the Music, p. 484. Oxford University Press. ISBN 0-19-511671-2.
- Malone, Bill C. (2002). Country music, U.S.A.. University of Texas Press. ISBN 0-292-75262-8.
- Smith, Richard D. (2000). Can't You Hear Me Callin': The Life of Bill Monroe, Father of Bluegrass. Little, Brown and Company. p. 23. ISBN 0-316-80381-2. "Arnold Shultz."
- Lightfoot, William (2015). A Regional Music Style: The Legacy of Arnold Shultz. The University of Kentucky Press.
- Ewing, Tom (2018-09-07). Bill Monroe: The Life and Music of the Blue Grass Man. University of Illinois Press.
- "The Arnold Shultz Fund". The IBMA Foundation.
