= Before I Grew Up to Love You =

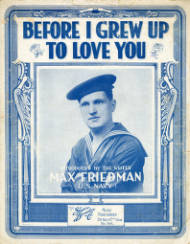
- Sheet music cover

Song
- Released: 1917
- Songwriter(s): Max Friedman

"Before I Grew Up To Love You" is a World War I era song released in 1917. Max Friedman wrote the lyrics and music. The song was published by Shapiro, Bernstein & Co. of New York City. There are two versions of the cover. One features a framed photo of Friedman in a sailor's uniform. The second version has a drawing of a man and woman with an orange-colored moon behind them. Below them is a branch of leaves. The song was written for voice and piano.

Henry Burr recorded the song on March 14, 1919. It was released under Columbia Records. The East Texas Serenaders recorded a version of the song. It was released under Brunswick Records.

The sheet music can be found at Pritzker Military Museum & Library.

The song is about a person's heartbreak in response to the end of a relationship. The chorus is as follows:

I wish I had never seen sunshine
I wish I had never seen rain
I wish that your soul had not been my goal
A prize that I sought all in vain
I only wish someone told me
That love that you gave me was untrue
And I wish I had died in my cradle
Before I grew up to love you.
