= That's All (Merle Travis song) =

Song by Merle Travis
- B-side: "Get Along Blues"
- Released: 1947
- Genre: Blues
- Length: 2:59
- Label: Capitol
- Songwriter: Merle Travis

That's All is a popular song written by Merle Travis, and included on his 1947 debut album Folk Songs of the Hills. Travis was inspired to write the song following a sermon he heard while attending a Cincinnati black church with his grandfather during the 1940s.

The song has had cover versions recorded by many notable artists including Lenny Breau on his 1969 album The Velvet Touch of Lenny Breau – Live!, Doc Watson on his 1973 album Then and Now, and Willie Nelson and Wynton Marsalis on their 2008 album Two Men with the Blues.
