= Max Friedman =

American songwriter (??–1964)

Max Friedman (died 1964) was an American songwriter and published music through his company, Max Friedman Music Publishing Co.

== Career ==
He composed songs about World War I including "Like a Baby Needs its Mother That's How Uncle Sam Needs You" (1917); "Our Own American Boy" (1917); "Before I Grew Up to Love You" (1918); and the post-war "Give the Job to the Gob and the Doughboy" (1919), a plea for employers to hire veterans, featuring lyrics by Lew Porter and Alex Sullivan.

He founded with P. and H. R. Shapiro the Max Friedman Music Publishing Co., which operated out of Buffalo, New York.

He also composed the 1928 Gene Austin hit "I Wish I Had Died In My Cradle (Before I Grew Up To Love You)", for which Lew Brown wrote the lyrics.

== Selected works ==
- Friedman, Max. Before I Grew Up to Love You. New York: Shapiro, Bernstein & Co, 1918. OCLC 818014519
- Friedman, Max, Lew Porter, and Alex Sullivan. Give a Job to the Gob and the Doughboy: Song. Detroit: Jerome H. Remick & Co., 1919. OCLC 79959095
- Friedman, M. I Wish I Had Died in My Cradle: Before I Grew Up to Love You. New York: Shapiro, Bernstein & Co. Inc, 1926. OCLC 497780739 and OCLC 898532476
- Friedman, Max. In the Heart of Kentucky: (Where You Gave Your Heart to Me). Pittsburgh, PA: Max Friedman Music Publishing Co., 1918. OCLC 430956449
- Friedman, Max, George F. Olcott, and Joseph Hiller. Like a Baby Needs Its Mother: That's How Uncle Sam Needs You. New York: M. Friedman Music Pub. Co, 1917. OCLC 13464779
- Friedman, Max. Lonesomeness. New York: Shapiro, Bernstein & Co, 1919. OCLC 498661994
- Friedman, Max, Frank Davis, and Louis Johnson. My Sweet Erin Rose. Pittsburgh: Max Friedman Music Publishing Co., 1916. OCLC 879555533
- Friedman, Max, Geo Olcott, and W. C. Wilbert. Our Own American Boy. Pittsburgh: Max Friedman Music Co., 1917. OCLC 20119592
- Friedman, Max, Walter C. Ness, Murray Sturm, and Kenn Sisson. Spread a little sunshine: where the sun never shines. New York: Max Friedman Music Publishing Co, Inc, 1924. OCLC 878602914
