= Folk Songs of the Hills =

Studio album by Merle Travis
- Released: 1947
- Recorded: 1946
- Genre: Traditional, country, Americana, bluegrass
- Label: Capitol
- Producer: Lee Gillette

Merle Travis chronology
Folk Songs of the Hills (1947)	The Merle Travis Guitar (1956)

Professional ratings
Review scores
Source	Rating
Allmusic	4.5/5 stars

Folk Songs of the Hills is a 1947 album by American singer Merle Travis. It is a collection of traditional songs from his home of Muhlenberg County, Kentucky, including original compositions evoking working life on the railroads and in the coal mines. Each song, accompanied by Travis on his own acoustic guitar, is introduced by a short narrative. Because of these characteristics, the album can be considered an early example of the concept album in popular music, along with Woody Guthrie's Dust Bowl Ballads and Frank Sinatra's In the Wee Small Hours. First issued as a 78 rpm box set album in 1947, this collection has remained in print in LP and CD reissues up to the present, with additional tracks from the same period added in later editions (the original album had eight songs, the most recent edition has 13).

Folk Songs of the Hills is widely regarded as one of Travis' finest achievements. A seminal work in his career, it brought him fame as an interpreter of traditional American folk music, as a brilliant finger-style guitarist, and as a folk-inspired composer whose songs "Dark as a Dungeon" and "Sixteen Tons", included in all editions of this album, have become classics of folk, country and popular music. In 2018, it was selected for preservation in the National Recording Registry by the Library of Congress as being "culturally, historically, or aesthetically significant".

== History ==
In 1944, Merle Travis moved to Hollywood, California, where he made a living by performing minor roles in Western films and playing with Ray Whitley's Western Swing Band. At the time, Capitol A & R man and producer Lee Gillette was looking for a way to enter the rising market for traditional American folk music created by singers and musicians such as John Jacob Niles, Burl Ives, Josh White, Woody Guthrie, Lead Belly, and the Golden Gate Quartet. Travis was known for his broad repertoire of country standards and outstanding guitar playing. Gillette signed him to a recording contract in 1946 and asked him to record a series of folk and folk-inspired songs accompanying himself on an acoustic guitar (although he usually played a hollow-body electric). The recordings that resulted, taking place at two dates in August 1946, led to the eight tracks that appeared on Folk Songs of the Hills, one of the earliest examples of a concept album. Though a commercial flop at the time, the album was widely admired by musicians, and Travis was invited to preserve some of his performances in a series of Snader Transcriptions, an early form of music video, which can be viewed today on several internet sites and DVDs. In 1955, one song from the album, "Sixteen Tons", was recorded by Tennessee Ernie Ford and became a million-selling crossover hit. A number of other songs from the album, such as "Dark as a Dungeon" and his arrangement of "Nine-pound Hammer," entered Travis's regular repertoire and are considered standards.

As the American folk music revival gathered steam in the 1950s, the album was incorporated into an LP entitled Back Home (Capitol Records T-891, 1957), adding four more tracks from electrical transcriptions made earlier by Travis in the same style for radio broadcast. Its first appearance on CD was as a remastered reissue by Bear Family Records 1993, including all 12 songs in Back Home, where it was coupled with the thematically related 1963 Capitol LP Songs of the Coal Mines. The latest reissue to date is Capitol's own remastered CD of 1996 (Capitol Vintage 35810), reprising all songs from Back Home as well as a further track dating from the 1940s, "This World Is Not My Home".

== Track listing ==
1. "Nine Pound Hammer" (Traditional)
2. "John Henry" (Traditional)
3. "Sixteen Tons" (Travis)
4. "Dark as a Dungeon" (Travis)
5. "That's All" (Travis)
6. "Over by Number Nine" (Travis)
7. "I Am a Pilgrim" (Traditional)
8. "Muskrat" (Traditional)

== Personnel ==
- Merle Travis – vocals and acoustic guitar
