= This Land Is Your Land =

Song by Woody Guthrie

Song by Woody Guthrie
- Published: September 1, 1945
- Recorded: April 1944 (long version): 1946 (short version)
- Genre: Folk
- Songwriter: Woody Guthrie

Audio sample
- "This Land Is Your Land", Woody Guthrie: file; help

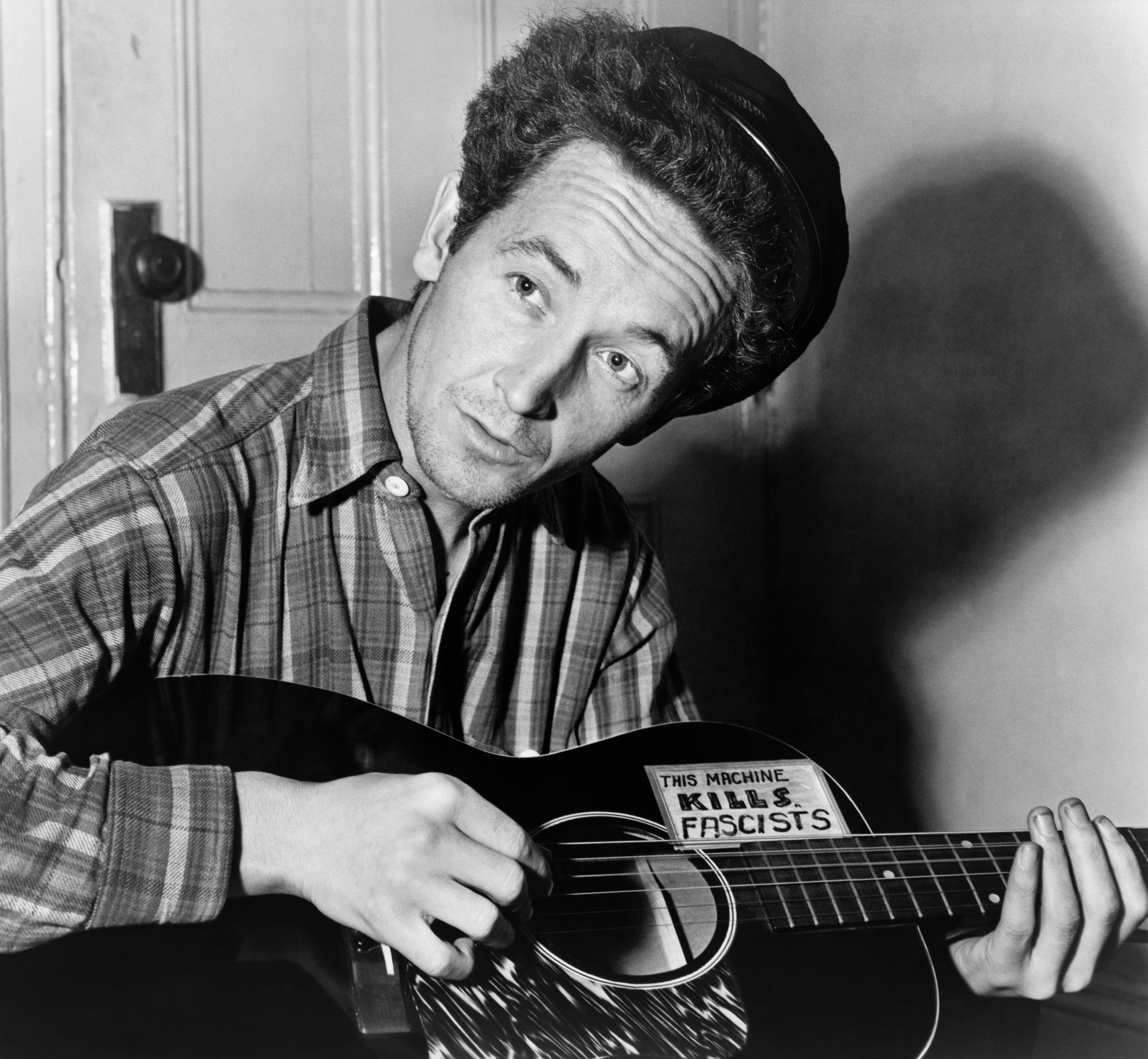
Woody Guthrie in March 1943

Sheet music

"This Land Is Your Land" is a song by American folk singer Woody Guthrie. One of the United States' most famous folk songs, its lyrics were written in 1940 in critical response to Irving Berlin's "God Bless America". Its melody is based on a Carter Family tune called "When the World's on Fire". When Guthrie was tired of hearing Kate Smith sing "God Bless America" on the radio in the late 1930s, he sarcastically called his song "God Blessed America for Me" before renaming it "This Land Is Your Land".

The popular short version was first released on the 10-inch album This Land Is My Land: American Work Songs (Folkways FP 27) in 1951. However, the song itself became well known due to that it was copyrighted and included in many songbooks from the mid-1940s through the 1950s.

In 1989, a 1947 recording on the Asch record label was inducted into the Grammy Hall of Fame.

In 2002, "This Land Is Your Land" was one of 50 recordings chosen by the Library of Congress to be added to the National Recording Registry. In 2021, it was listed at No. 229 on Rolling Stone's "Top 500 Greatest Songs of All Time," and in 2025, it was listed at No. 11 on its list of "The 100 Best Protest Songs of All Time." In June 2026, CBS News included the song in its list of the 250 essential American songs of the past 250 years.

== Melody ==
Guthrie's melody was very similar to the melody of "Oh, My Loving Brother", a Baptist gospel hymn that had been recorded by the Carter Family as "When the World's On Fire" and had inspired their "Little Darlin', Pal of Mine." He used the same melody for the chorus and the verses.

== Lyrics ==
=== Original 1940 lyrics ===
The original lyrics were composed on February 23, 1940, in Guthrie's room at the Hanover House hotel at 43rd St. and 6th Ave. (101 West 43rd St.) in New York. The line "This land was made for you and me" does not appear in the original manuscript at the end of each verse, but is implied by Guthrie's writing of those words at the top of the page and by his subsequent singing of the line with those words.

According to Joe Klein, after Guthrie composed it, "he completely forgot about the song, and didn't do anything with it for another five years."

=== 1944 version lyrics ===
In 1944, during World War II, Guthrie prepared another version, which drops the two verses that are critical of the United States from the original: verse four, regarding private property, and verse six, regarding hunger. By 1944, after Germany had invaded the Soviet Union in 1941, Guthrie supported U.S. involvement in Europe.

=== Confirmation of two other verses ===
After we built the Coolee Dam we had to sell the people out there a lot of bonds to get the money to buy the copper wire and high lines and pay a whole big bunch of people at work and I don't know what all. We called them Public Utility Bonds, just about like a War Bond, same thing. (And a lot of politicians told the folks not to buy them but we sold them anyhow). The main idea about this song is, you think about these Eight words all the rest of your life and they'll come a bubbling up into Eighty Jillion all Union. Try it and see. THIS LAND IS MADE FOR YOU AND ME.

— Woody Guthrie, from 10 Songs of Woody Guthrie, 1945

The April 1944 recording in the possession of the Smithsonian, the earliest known recording of the song, has the "private property" verse included. This version was recorded the same day as 75 other songs. This was confirmed by several archivists for Smithsonian who were interviewed as part of the History Channel program Save Our History – Save our Sounds. The 1944 recording with this fourth verse was released in 1997, on Woody Guthrie: This Land is Your Land: The Asch Recordings Volume 1, where it is track 14.

There was a big high wall there that tried to stop me;
Sign was painted, it said private property;
But on the back side it didn't say nothing;
This land was made for you and me.

Woodyguthrie.org also has a variant.

A 1945 pamphlet which omitted the last two verses has caused some question as to whether the original song did in fact contain the full text. The original manuscript confirms both of these verses.

As with other folk songs, it was sung with different words at various times, although the motives for this particular change of lyrics may involve the possible political interpretations of the verses. Recordings of Guthrie have him singing the verses with different words.

The verses critical of America are not often performed in schools or official functions. They can be best interpreted as a protest against the vast income inequalities that exist in the United States, and against the sufferings of millions during the Great Depression. The US, Guthrie insists, was made—and could still be made—for "you and me". This interpretation is consistent with such other Guthrie songs as "Pretty Boy Floyd" and Guthrie's lifelong struggle for social justice.

A rewritten Canadian version by Toronto-based folk group the Travellers was the first popular hit version of "This Land Is Your Land", receiving much airplay in Canada (although nowhere else) as early as 1956. Pete Seeger, a friend of both Woody Guthrie and of The Travellers, encouraged the Toronto band to "do something" with the song, which had been recorded by his group the Weavers in an unreleased version—and Seeger felt it would never be released due to his being blacklisted. The Travellers thought making the song about Canada would appeal to their audience, so made the appropriate changes to the chorus, namechecking several Canadian locations in place of American ones. The private property and relief line verses were not included; it is possible The Travellers had never heard them prior to recording their version of the song. The song was an immediate hit in Canada, and remains The Travellers' best-known recording. At the founding convention of the Canadian social democratic New Democratic Party in 1961, the Travellers' version of "This Land Is Your Land" was sung by the attending delegates.

The song was revived in America the 1960s, when several artists of the new folk movement, including Bob Dylan, the Kingston Trio, Trini Lopez, Jay and the Americans, and the New Christy Minstrels all recorded versions, inspired by its political message. Peter, Paul and Mary recorded the song in 1962 for their Moving album. The Seekers recorded the song for their 1965 album, A World of Our Own. In 1965 the Mormon Tabernacle Choir, in collaboration with the Philadelphia Orchestra, recorded the song as the title track of an album of 13 Best Loved American Folk Songs.

In March 1977, David Carradine, who had personified Woody Guthrie in Hal Ashby's 1976 biopic Bound for Glory, appeared on Dinah Shore's show, Dinah! On it, he performed a version of the song which included the two verses, with some variations:

Well, one bright Sunday morning in the shadow of the steeple
By the relief line I saw my people
As they stood there whistlin' they stood there hungry
Don't they know that this land was made for you and me?

Well, as I was walking, I saw a sign there
And on the sign it said "No Trespassing"
But on the other side it didn't say nothing
That side was made for you and me!

In the film, the song is performed in the closing credits by several singers, starting with Carradine and including Woody Guthrie. The verse about the "No Trespassing" sign appears there, but the two verses are not in the soundtrack album's version.

Bruce Springsteen first began performing it live on the River Tour in 1980, and released one such performance of it on Live/1975–85, in which he called it "about one of the most beautiful songs ever written".

The song was performed by Springsteen and Pete Seeger, accompanied by Seeger's grandson, Tao Rodríguez-Seeger, at We Are One: The Obama Inaugural Celebration at the Lincoln Memorial on January 18, 2009. The song was restored to the original lyrics (including the 'There was a big high wall there' and 'Nobody living can ever stop me' verses) for this performance (as per Pete Seeger's request) with exceptions of the changes in the end of the 'Private Property' and 'Relief Office' verses; the former's final line was changed from "This land was made for you and me" to "That side was made for you and me," and the latter's third and fourth lines to "As they stood hungry, I stood there whistling, This land was made for you and me," from the original lyrics, "As they stood there hungry, I stood there asking, Is this land made for you and me?"

Voice actress and children's entertainer Debi Derryberry recorded a version for her musical album What A Way To Play in 2006.

In 2010, Peter Yarrow and Paul Stookey, the surviving members of Peter, Paul and Mary, requested that the National Organization for Marriage, which was at the time against legalization of same-sex marriage, stop using their recording of "This Land is Your Land" at their rallies, stating in a letter that the organization's philosophy was "directly contrary to the advocacy position" held by the group.

In 2019, Arlo Guthrie led a version of "This Land is Your Land" at the July 4 Boston Pops concert. Guthrie sang the 'no trespassing' verse but substituted the first line of the 'private property' verse ('There was a big high wall there, that tried to stop me / And on the wall it said "no trespassing"'), and Queen Latifah sang the 'freedom highway' verse. The 'Relief Office' verse was not included.

Arlo Guthrie tells a story in concerts on occasion, of his mother returning from a dance tour of China, and reporting around the Guthrie family dinner table that at one point in the tour she was serenaded by Chinese children singing the song. Arlo says Woody was incredulous: "The Chinese? Singing 'This land is your land, this land is my land? From California to the New York island?'"

On January 20, 2021, during the presidential inauguration of Joe Biden, Jennifer Lopez performed some verses of the song as part of a medley with America the Beautiful. She excluded verses critical of the United States and interposed a Spanish-language translation of a portion of the Pledge of Allegiance.

At the Memorial Day event at Arlington National Cemetery on May 26, 2025, the song was performed by members of the U.S. Navy, with President Donald Trump, Vice President JD Vance, and Secretary of Defense Pete Hegseth in attendance.

== Variations ==
As is the case with many well-known songs, it has been the subject of an enormous number of variations and parodies. They include:

=== Versions about other countries ===
Many variants of the song have been recorded with lyrics adjusted to fit diverse countries, regions, languages, and ethnic groups. They include:

- Canadian: The Canadian folk music group The Travellers popularized their version in 1955. Their modified chorus contains the lyrics,
  This land is your land, This land is my land,
  From Bonavista, to Vancouver Island
  From the Arctic Circle to the Great Lake waters,
  This land was made for you and me.
- Swedish: musician Mikael Wiehe has written a text in Swedish, Det här är ditt land.
- English:
  - The UK anarcho-punk band Zounds rewrote it for their 1981 debut LP, The Curse of Zounds, releasing a remixed CD-single version as a fund-raising benefit in 2001.
  - Billy Bragg has used a version of the song with UK-specific lyrics in live performances. A version was included on the bonus tracks section of the 2006 re-release of his The Internationale album.
- Welsh: A Welsh language version, Mae'n Wlad i Mi, was recorded by nationalist folk singer Dafydd Iwan.
- Cornish: A Cornish language version, An Tir yw Ow Bro, was recorded by the Cornish language activist and folk singer Brian Webb in 1985.
- German: A version with German lyrics was released by Helmut, Sigrid and Knut Kiesewetter in 1965.
- Irish: An Irish rebel song version, often performed with Let the People Sing, has been recorded by many artists including the Wolfe Tones and Charlie and the Bhoys. This version is sung by supporters of Celtic Football Club, an Irish / Scottish football club.
- Scottish: Two Scottish versions exist, one by Woody Guthrie and another by The Waterboys.
- International: Belgian singing duo Hanny and Adri made a version in 1969 in Esperanto, titled "Jen Nia Mondo", literally "Behold Our World".
- Turkish: Folk singer Nuri Sesigüzel covered the song with Turkish lyrics.
- Australian: Folk singer Shirley Jacobs (1927-2015) recorded a version on her 1975 vinyl album Songs of Love and Freedom.
- Mexican-American: For the title song of their Esta Tierra Es Tuya album, the Sones de México Ensemble son group, based in Chicago, translated the song into Spanish, with the "Sign was painted, it said private property" lyrics slightly modified to refer to the Mexico–United States border.
- Catalan: A Catalan version of this song, Aquesta és la nostra terra, was recorded by La Trinca in its 1969 album Tots som pops. A second version in Catalan was recorded in 2012 by La Coixinera with the title Mar i Muntanya (transl. Sea and Mountain) included in the album Transformacions
- Guyana: The Guyanese version which is included in the list of national folk songs of Guyana contains the following lyrics:
  This land is my land; this land is your land,
  From the Rupununi, to the Corentyne.
  From the green heart forest, to the Atlantic waters;
  This land was made for you and me.

=== Other variations ===
"This Land Is Your Land"
Upbeat choral arrangement with concert band accompaniment, United States Air Force Band Singing Sergeants

The song has been recorded by many performers over the years, ranging from American Country legend Glen Campbell, hardcore band Hated Youth, all the way to Turkish performer Nuri Sesigüzel to reggae group The Melodians.

A few other notable recordings are by:

- Peter, Paul and Mary – for their album Moving (1963)
- Bing Crosby – for the album America, I Hear You Singing (1964)
- The Seekers – in the album A World of Our Own (1965)
- Connie Francis – included in her album Connie Francis and The Kids Next Door (1966)
- Tennessee Ernie Ford – recorded for his album America the Beautiful (1970)
- David Carradine - in the soundtrack album of Bound for Glory, Woody Guthrie's biopic directed by Hal Ashby (1976)
- Sharon Jones & the Dap-Kings – in the album Naturally (2005).

A version called "This badge is your badge", about FC United of Manchester, was written by fan Mickey O'Farrell, and is often sung by fans at the club's matches.

=== In film, television, internet, books, and advertising ===
The song has been sung by characters in many film and television productions, including Bob Roberts (1992), Stepmom (1998), Full House, The Luck of the Irish (a Disney Channel original movie), Up in the Air (2009), by Renée Zellweger in the 2010 film My Own Love Song, and by Edward Norton in the 2024 Bob Dylan biopic A Complete Unknown.

It has been parodied many times, including:

- In the Home Improvement episode "Too Many Cooks" (1994), Tim refers to Al as "Al 'This Land Is' Borland".
- A 1999 episode of Friends when Joey meets a man he believes to be his "hand-twin", resulting in the lyric "This hand is my hand."
- The Simpsons episode "Lisa the Treehugger" (2000) with the words changed to "This log is my log, this log is your log" in reference to a runaway giant redwood tree.
- In 2016, Budweiser temporarily rebranded their flagship beer "America", and included the lyrics "...from the redwood forests, to the gulf stream waters, this land was made for you and me" on their labels.
- Pop singer Lady Gaga sang a few phrases of the song at the beginning of the performance of her halftime show of the 2017 Super Bowl.
- The FX on Hulu series Mrs. America (episode 8 "Houston") depicts a group of women singing the song with a guitar. Actress Sarah Paulson's character (Alice McCray) joins in by singing one of the variant verses often omitted ("Nobody living can ever stop me, As I go walking that freedom highway; Nobody living can ever make me turn back, This land was made for you and me"). Another character points to McCray that the song was written by Guthrie, referred to as "a socialist" (a point relevant in the dialogue to state a contradiction between McCray's conservative views and her love for the song). This could be the reason to pick such an obscure verse, as this particular verse can only be linked to Guthrie and not to one of the many versions of the song by other artist.

== Copyright controversy ==
This song book, which includes "This Land Is Your Land", was published by Guthrie in 1945.

A widely published quote of Guthrie's about copyright has been cited by some scholars to suggest that he was against copyright protection for his work:

This song is Copyrighted in U.S., under Seal of Copyright # 154085, for a period of 28 years, and anybody caught singin it without our permission, will be mighty good friends of ourn, cause we don't give a dern. Publish it. Write it. Sing it. Swing to it. Yodel it. We wrote it, that's all we wanted to do.

Kembrew McLeod suggested this quote was made by Guthrie in reference to "This Land is Your Land", but that claim is inaccurate. The copyright registration number "#154085" referenced in the quote is for Guthrie's song "California!" (also known as "California! California!" or "California! The Land of the Sky!"). The quote was printed under the lyrics to "California!" in a songbook Guthrie made in 1937 – three years before the first draft of "This Land" was written.

A number of different organizations claim copyright for the song.

According to the Carter Family, the melody came from a tune that A.P. Carter had found and recorded with Sarah and Maybelle Carter prior to 1934 and was not original to Guthrie.

In July 2004, the website JibJab hosted a parody of the song, with George W. Bush and John Kerry singing altered lyrics to comment on the U.S. presidential election that November, resulting in The Richmond Organization, a music publisher that owns the copyright to Guthrie's tune through its Ludlow Music unit, threatening legal action.

JibJab then sued to affirm their parody was fair use, with the Electronic Frontier Foundation (EFF) acting for them. As part of their research on the case they found that the song had been first published by Woody Guthrie in 1945, although the copyright was not registered until 1956. This meant that when Ludlow applied to renew the copyright in 1984 they were 11 years too late as the song had been in the public domain since 1973 (28 years from first publication). The Richmond Organization settled with JibJab shortly thereafter, agreeing that JibJab were free to distribute their parody. In an interview on NPR, Arlo Guthrie said that he thought the parody was hilarious and he thought Woody would have loved it too. Richmond still, however, claims copyright on other versions of the song, such as those appearing in the 1956 and later publications. Legally, such claims only apply to original elements of the song that were not in the public domain version.

The Richmond Organization and Ludlow Music were sued in 2016 over their claims of copyright in a lawsuit led by Randall Newman. In a similar case, Newman previously successfully argued the song "Happy Birthday to You" was public domain. In February 2020, Judge P. Kevin Castel of the Federal District Court in Manhattan dismissed the case because the plaintiffs had already paid the license fee, so there was no legal dispute to adjudicate.

== See also ==
- List of socialist songs
