= Moving (Peter, Paul and Mary album) =

Studio album by Peter, Paul & Mary
- Released: January 1963
- Recorded: 1962
- Genre: Folk
- Length: 34:46
- Label: Warner Bros.
- Producer: Albert Grossman; Milton Okun (musical director)

Peter, Paul & Mary chronology
Peter, Paul and Mary (1962)	Moving (1963)	In the Wind (1963)

Professional ratings
Review scores
Source	Rating
AllMusic	3/5 stars
New Record Mirror	4/5 stars

Moving is the second album by the American folk music trio Peter, Paul & Mary, released in January 1963. The third single included in the album, "Puff, the Magic Dragon," was a huge hit and a defining song for the trio, reaching No. 2 on the Hot 100, No. 1 on the Easy Listening, and No. 10 on the R&B Charts.

== Reception ==
The album received a positive critical reception upon its release. The initial Cashbox review said that "the trio's distinctive, urban, dramatic sound is aptly showcased in a fine dozen of familiar and little known tunes." Jimmy Watson on behalf of New Record Mirror stated that "I have a feeling in my bones that this trio could click here, given the right record. Their sound is very intimate and decidedly entertaining," and called it a "fine collection" as well.

The retrospective review by Bruce Eder on AllMusic believed that the trio's second album is "a little less distinctive than its predecessor, which doesn't mean that it isn't a beautiful record – just less obviously compelling in its melodies, and perhaps slightly less optimistic in mood."

== Chart performance ==
The lead-off single, "Big Boat", failed to chart substantially, only staying on the Billboard Hot 100 two weeks, reaching No. 93. Cash Box described it as "an exciting, fast moving folk opus." The second single, "Settle Down (Goin' Down That Highway)," did slightly better, peaking at No. 56 on the Pop charts during a six-week run; however, it did become an easy listening hit at No. 14.

The album debuted on Billboard magazine's Top LP's chart in the issue dated January 19, 1963, peaking at No. 2 during a ninety-nine-week run on the chart. It debuted on Cashbox magazine's Top 100 Albums chart in the issue dated January, 1963, peaking at No. 1 during a seventy-six-week run on the chart.

== Track listing ==
Side One
No.	Title	Writer(s)	Length
1.	"Settle Down (Goin' Down That Highway)"	Mike Settle	1:44
2.	"Gone the Rainbow"	Paul Stookey, Mary Travers, Peter Yarrow, Milt Okun	2:40
3.	"Flora"	Stookey, Travers, Elaina Mezzetti	3:09
4.	"Pretty Mary"	Stookey, Elaina Mezzetti, Okun	1:57
5.	"Puff, the Magic Dragon"	Peter Yarrow, Leonard Lipton	3:26
6.	"This Land Is Your Land"	Woody Guthrie	2:26

Side Two
No.	Title	Writer(s)	Length
7.	"Man Come into Egypt"	Fred Hellerman, Fran Minkoff	2:18
8.	"Old Coat"	Stookey, Travers, Mezzetti	3:49
9.	"Tiny Sparrow"	Stookey, Elaina Mezzetti, Milt Okun	3:33
10.	"Big Boat"	Stookey, Lane, Milt Okun, Elaina Mezzetti	2:43
11.	"Morning Train"	Mezzetti	3:37
12.	"A'soalin'"	Stookey, Tracy Batteaste, Elaina Mezzetti	3:16
Total length:			34:44

== Personnel ==
- Peter Yarrow – vocals, guitar
- Noel "Paul" Stookey – vocals, guitar
- Mary Travers – vocals

== Chart positions ==
Chart performance for Moving
Chart (1963)	Peak position
US Billboard Top LPs	2
US Cashbox Top 100 Albums	1

== Certification ==
Region	Certification	Certified units/sales
United States (RIAA)	Gold	500,000^{^}
^{^} Shipments figures based on certification alone.
