= Jordan Is a Hard Road to Travel =

Song
- Published: 1853
- Genre: Minstrel tune, folk song
- Songwriter: Daniel Decatur Emmett

Jordan Is a Hard Road to Travel is a song composed by American songwriter Dan Emmett for an 1853 blackface minstrel show. The song became extremely popular throughout the United States. It was recorded in 1927 by banjo player and singing entertainer Uncle Dave Macon, an early Grand Ole Opry star. The song was later included on the Smithsonian Institution's Folkways collection, Classic Country Music: A Smithsonian Collection. Peter, Paul and Mary sing this song on their Moving album in 1963 as "Old Coat".

== See also ==
- Classic Country Music: A Smithsonian Collection
