= Matthew 9:20 =

- ← 9:19 9:21 →
- Book: Gospel of Matthew
- Christian Bible part: New Testament

Matthew 9:20 is a verse in the ninth chapter of the Gospel of Matthew in the New Testament.

== Content ==
In the original Greek according to Westcott-Hort for this verse is:

Καὶ ἰδού, γυνὴ αἱμορροοῦσα δώδεκα ἔτη, προσελθοῦσα ὄπισθεν, ἥψατο τοῦ κρασπέδου τοῦ ἱματίου αὐτοῦ.

In the King James Version of the Bible the text reads:

And, behold, a woman, which was diseased with an issue of blood twelve years, came behind him, and touched the hem of his garment:

The New International Version translates the passage as:

Just then a woman who had been subject to bleeding for twelve years came up behind him and touched the edge of his cloak.

== Analysis ==
Eusebius tells us that this woman was from Cæsarea Philippi, where, in honour of her miraculous cure, "afterwards erected a brazen monument, descriptive of this event, before the door of her house."

== Commentary from the Church Fathers ==
Chrysostom: "Mark and Luke say that He took with Him three disciples only, namely, Peter, James, and John; He took not Matthew, to quicken his desires, and because he was yet not perfectly minded; and for this reason He honours these three, that others may become like-minded. It was enough meanwhile for Matthew to see the things that were done respecting her that had the issue of blood, concerning whom it follows; And, behold, a woman who had suffered an issue of blood twelve years, came behind and touched the hem of his garment."

Jerome: "This woman that had the flux came to the Lord not in the house, nor in the town, for she was excluded from them by the Law, but by the way as He walked; thus as He goes to heal one woman, another is cured."

Chrysostom: "She came not to Christ with an open address through shame concerning this her disease, believing herself unclean; for in the Law this disease was esteemed highly unclean. For this reason she hides herself."

Saint Remigius: "In which her humility must be praised, that she came not before His face, but behind, and judged herself unworthy to touch the Lord’s feet, yea, she touched not His whole garment, but the hem only; for the Lord wore a hem according to the command of the Law. So the Pharisees also wore hems which they made large, and in some they inserted thorns. But the Lord’s hem was not made to wound, but to heal, and therefore it follows, For she said within herself, If I can but touch his garment, I shall be made whole. How wonderful her faith, that though she despaired of health from the physicians, on whom notwithstanding she had exhausted her living, she perceived that a heavenly Physician was at hand, and therefore bent her whole soul on Him; whence she deserved to be healed; But Jesus turning and seeing her, said, Be of good cheer, daughter, thy faith hath made thee whole."

Preceded by Matthew 9:19	Gospel of Matthew; Chapter 9	Succeeded by Matthew 9:21
