= Rosewood, Kentucky =

Unincorporated community in Kentucky, United States

- Unincorporated community
- Location within Kentucky Location within the United States
- Coordinates: 37°5′12″N 87°5′22″W
- Country: United States
- State: Kentucky
- County: Muhlenberg
- Elevation: 600 ft (180 m)
- Time zone: UTC-6 (Central (CST))
  - Summer (DST): UTC-5 (CST)
- GNIS feature ID: 502355

Rosewood is an unincorporated community located in Muhlenberg County, Kentucky, United States.

== History ==
The community was named for the abundance of rosewood.

== Geography ==
The community is located along Kentucky Route 973 in southern Muhlenberg County.

== In popular culture ==
A fictitious Louisville suburb also named Rosewood, along with real towns in the Louisville area such as Muldraugh, West Point, and Louisville itself are the main setting of the open-world survival horror game Project Zomboid.

== Notable people ==
- Merle Travis, country singer and guitarist.
