= The Merle Travis Guitar =

Album by Merle Travis

Studio album by Merle Travis
- Released: 1956
- Recorded: 1955
- Genres: Country; country boogie; blues; folk; Americana
- Label: Capitol
- Producers: Cliffie Stone, Ken Nelson

Merle Travis chronology
Folk Songs of the Hills (1947)	The Merle Travis Guitar (1956)	Back Home (1957)

Professional ratings
Review scores
Source	Rating
Allmusic	4/5 stars

The Merle Travis Guitar is the second album by Merle Travis and his first instrumental album. It was recorded in 1955 and released on January 1, 1956 by Capitol Records. Together with another Capitol release of the previous year, Back Home, it introduced the style of guitar playing that came to be known as Travis picking to a wide public of finger-style guitarists and folk music enthusiasts. The album contains a selection of traditional guitar pickers' tunes from Travis' native Muhlenberg County, Kentucky, and includes old standards, blues and rags.

== Track listing ==
All tracks are written by Merle Travis unless otherwise noted.

No.	Title	Writer(s)	Length
1.	"Blue Smoke"		2:24
2.	"Black Diamond Blues"		3:05
3.	"On a Bicycle Built for Two"	Harry Dacre	2:09
4.	"Saturday Night Shuffle"		2:05
5.	"Bugle Call Rag"	Billy Meyers, Elmer Schoebel, Jack Pettis	2:19
6.	"Tuck Me to Sleep in My Old 'Tucky Home"	George W. Meyer, Joe Young, Sam Lewis	2:27
7.	"Walkin' the Strings"		1:50
8.	"The Memphis Blues"	W. C. Handy	2:35
9.	"The Sheik of Araby"	Francis Wheeler, Harry B. Smith, Ted Snyder	2:04
10.	"Blue Bell"	Edward Madden, Theodore Morse	2:19
11.	"The Waltz You Saved for Me"	Emil Flindt, Gus Kahn, Wayne King	2:30
12.	"Rockabye Rag"		1:56

== Personnel ==
- Merle Travis - electric guitar
