= No Vacancy (Merle Travis song) =

1946 song by Merle Travis and Cliffie Stone

Single by Merle Travis
- B-side: "Cincinnati Lou"
- Released: May 1946
- Recorded: March 18, 1946
- Studio: Radio Recorders, Los Angeles
- Genre: Hillbilly
- Length: 2:43
- Label: Capitol 258
- Songwriter(s): Merle Travis, Cliffie Stone

Merle Travis singles chronology
| "No Vacancy" (1946) | "Divorce Me C.O.D." (1946) |

"No Vacancy" is a song written by Merle Travis and Cliffie Stone in 1946. The best-known version of the song is Travis' own, which reached #3 on the country charts in that year.

The song's lyrics tell, in first person, of a World War II veteran who returns and finds nowhere to live: "All along the line it's the same old sign waitin' for me./No Vacancy, No Vacancy"

Reportedly, "No Vacancy" got Travis his first major solo recording contract. Cliffie Stone brought the idea for the song to Travis and then brought the demo to Capitol Records after Travis wrote and recorded the song. Lee Gillette at Capitol liked the song, signed Travis, and "No Vacancy" became his first hit.

The song has also been recorded by Glen Campbell (on his first album, Big Bluegrass Special (1962)) and Ricky Nelson (1966, on Bright Lights & Country Music).
