= The East Texas Serenaders =

American country group

Background information
- Origin: Lindale, Texas, United States
- Genres: Country; Western swing
- Years active: 1927-1937
- Labels: Columbia; Brunswick; Decca
- Past members: Daniel Huggins Williams; John Munnerlyn; Cloet Hamman; Henry Bogan; Shorty Lester; Henry Lester

The East Texas Serenaders were an American country group formed in Lindale, Texas in 1927. The five-piece musical ensemble was an early innovator in the musical genre later defined as Western swing.

== History ==
The group's line-up consisted of Daniel Huggins Williams (fiddle), John Munnerlyn (banjo), Cloet Hamman (acoustic guitar), Henry Bogan (cello), and an unidentified second guitarist. Williams, the designated frontman and primary songwriter of the ensemble, was a rare left-handed fiddler who also later tutored other musicians such as Johnny Gimble. Munnerlyn was a part-time musician as he worked United Gas Pipeline Company, while Hamman learned the rudiments of guitar as he was backing up his father, a locally renowned musician in Lindale. Unique to early Western swing ensembles of the era, was the Serenaders' feature of the cello, played by Bogan. Unusually, Bogan was equipped with just three strings on the instrument, which evoked a similar resonance found in recordings by African-American musicians.

Since the members were by majority not full-time musicians, the group preferred to perform regionally at social events and dance halls. Their popularity, however, still managed to spread to the surrounding states, prompting recording agent H. M. Barnes to represent the ensemble. With a repertoire that swayed toward ragtime and waltz music, the Serenaders' sound is described as "clear steps toward swing and string-band music, a departure from the folk-band tradition. Some critics have given the Serenaders for the beginning of Western swing. Hamman, Bogan, and Munnerlyn made one of the most forceful rhythm sections in history". In addition to the group's progressive arrangements, they also incorporated jazz and cajun influences they encountered while listening to radio programming.

On December 2, 1927, the Serenaders recorded two songs, "Combination Rag" and "Sweetestest Flower Rag", for Columbia Records in Dallas. The latter rag in particular was Williams' tour de force as he accumulated more notes per bar than almost any fiddler of the era was capable to play. Some of the classical stylings Williams mastered is attributed to a wandering fiddler "from the north" who is only known by his surname Brigsley. Between October 25, 1928, and November 25, 1930, the Serenaders recorded 14 sides for Brunswick Records including "Shannon Waltz" which was later compiled on the 1981 compilation album The Smithsonian Collection of Classic Country Music. In 1930, Munnerlyn departed the group to move to Houston and was replaced by Shorty Lester, whose brother, Henry, occasionally played fiddle in live performances and the Serenaders' final recording sessions.

On November 30, 1937, the group recorded 10 sides for Decca Records. Shortly thereafter, the ensemble disbanded.

On October 14, 1998, Document Records released all of the Serenaders' recorded material on the compilation album Complete Recorded Works.
