= Dark as a Dungeon =

Song by Merle Travis
- Released: 1946
- Genre: Country, folk
- Songwriter: Merle Travis

"Dark as a Dungeon" is a song written by singer-songwriter Merle Travis. It is a lament about the danger and drudgery of being a coal miner in a shaft mine. It has become a rallying song among miners seeking improved working conditions.

The song achieved much of its fame when it was performed by Johnny Cash in his Folsom Prison concert (At Folsom Prison) in 1968. During this live performance, one of the prisoners in the background was laughing, and Cash started to chuckle. He gently admonished the man, "No laughing during the song, please!" The man yelled something about "Hell!" and Cash answered, "I know, 'hell'!" When he finished the song, Cash made a comment that was largely repeated, somewhat out of context, by Joaquin Phoenix in the 2005 Cash biographical film Walk the Line: "I just wanted to tell you that this show is being recorded for an album released on Columbia Records, so you can't say 'hell' or 'shit' or anything like that." In June 2026, CBS News included the song in its list of the 250 essential American songs of the past 250 years.

== Recorded versions ==
- Merle Travis on Folk Songs of the Hills, 1946
- Maddox Brothers and Rose, 1950
- Cisco Houston, Early 1950s
- Tennessee Ernie Ford, 1955
- Harry Belafonte on The Many Moods of Belafonte (1962)
- Gordon Lightfoot and Terry Whelan on Two Tones at the Village Corner, 1962
- Johnny Cash, studio version as the B-side of "Understand Your Man" single (1964); live version at Folsom Prison (1968)
- Wolfe Tones on The Foggy Dew - as "Down in the Mines" (1965)
- The Twiliters on In Concert (1966)
- Merle Travis with The Nitty Gritty Dirt Band on Will the Circle Be Unbroken (1972)
- Dolly Parton on 9 to 5 and Odd Jobs (1980)
- Patrick Sky on Through a Window, 1985
- Wall of Voodoo on Seven Days in Sammystown (1985)
- The Seldom Scene with Charlie Waller on 15th Anniversary Celebration (1988)
- Frank Tovey on Tyranny and the Hired Hand (1989)
- Souled American on Sonny (1992)
- Ramblin' Jack Elliott, duet with Guy Clark, on Friends of Mine (1998)
- The Chieftains with Vince Gill on Down the Old Plank Road: The Nashville Sessions (2002)
- Marley's Ghost on Ghost Country (1996)
- Queens of the Stone Age, 2005
- Jerry Garcia and David Grisman on Been All Around This World (2004)
- Charlie Louvin on Sings Murder Ballads and Disaster Songs (2008)
- Kathy Mattea on Coal (2008)
- Willie Nelson on Country Music (2010)
- Amy Grant on the Lee C. Camp & Friends specialty album, Tokens 9: "Back to Green" (2010)
- John Darnielle of The Mountain Goats on The Front Porch Sessions (The Front Porch Festival, 2012)
- John Mellencamp for the soundtrack of the documentary From the Ashes (2017)
- Joni Mitchell on the archival release Joni Mitchell Archives – Vol. 1: The Early Years (1963–1967) (2020)
- Being a well-documented song publicized by EFDSS, and Mainly Norfolk, the song was recorded by Jon Boden and Oli Steadman for inclusion in their respective projects A Folk Song a Day and 365 Days of Folk.

== Published versions ==
- Rise Up Singing page 145
