= Sixteen Tons =

American folk song

Song by Merle Travis

from the album Folk Songs of the Hills
- B-side: "Dark as a Dungeon"
- Released: July 1947
- Recorded: August 8, 1946
- Studio: Radio Recorders, Los Angeles
- Genre: Country Western
- Length: 2:54
- Label: Capitol Americana
- Songwriter: Merle Travis
- Producer: Lee Gillette

Official audio
- "Sixteen Tons" on YouTube

"Sixteen Tons" is a song written by Merle Travis about a coal miner, based on life in the mines of Rosewood, Kentucky. Travis first recorded the song at the Radio Recorders Studio B in Hollywood, California, on August 8, 1946. Cliffie Stone played bass on the recording. It was first released in July 1947 by Capitol on Travis's album Folk Songs of the Hills. The song became a gold record.

== Authorship ==
The sole authorship of "Sixteen Tons" is attributed to Merle Travis on all recordings beginning with Travis's own 1946 record and is registered with BMI as a Merle Travis composition.

George S. Davis, a folk singer and songwriter who had been a Kentucky coal miner, claimed on a 1966 recording for Folkways Records to have written the song as "Nine-to-ten tons" in the 1930s; he also at different times claimed to have written the song as "Twenty-One Tons". There is no supporting evidence for Davis's claim. Davis's 1966 recording of his version of the song (with some slightly different lyrics and tune, but titled "Sixteen Tons") appears on the albums George Davis: When Kentucky Had No Union Men and Classic Mountain Songs from Smithsonian.

In oral historian Alessandro Portelli's They Say in Harlan County, one of Portelli's informants, Parris Burke, claims that Alfred Hunt wrote the song, but as Portelli notes, he was one of many to claim authorship of the tune.

The line "another day older and deeper in debt" from the chorus came from a letter written by Travis's brother John. This and the line "I owe my soul to the company store" are references to the truck system and debt bondage. Under this scrip system, workers were not paid cash; rather they were paid with non-transferable credit vouchers that could be exchanged only for goods sold at the company store. This made it impossible for workers to accumulate cash savings.

Workers also usually lived in company-owned dormitories or houses, the rent for which was automatically deducted from their pay. In the United States the truck system and associated debt bondage persisted until the strikes of the newly formed United Mine Workers and affiliated unions forced an end to such practices.

The eponymous "sixteen tons" refers to a practice of initiating new miners. In the mid-1920s, a miner tended to haul eight to ten tons per day, whereas for new miners, other miners would slack off so the new miner could "'make sixteen' on his very first day."

== Tennessee Ernie Ford version ==
"Sixteen Tons"

Single by Tennessee Ernie Ford

from the album Ford Favorites
- A-side: "You Don't Have to Be a Baby to Cry"
- Released: October 1955
- Recorded: September 20, 1955
- Genre: Rhythm and blues; country; traditional pop
- Length: 2:34
- Label: Capitol
- Songwriter: Merle Travis
- Producer: Jack Fascinato

Tennessee Ernie Ford singles chronology
"His Hands" (1955)	"Sixteen Tons" (1955)	"That's All" (1955)

Official audio
- "Sixteen Tons" on YouTube

Tennessee Ernie Ford recorded "Sixteen Tons" in 1955 as the B-side of his cover of the Moon Mullican standard "You Don't Have to Be a Baby to Cry". With Ford's snapping fingers and a unique clarinet-driven pop arrangement, it quickly became a million seller. It hit Billboard 's country music chart in November and held the No. 1 position for ten weeks, then crossed over and held the No. 1 position on the pop music chart for eight weeks, besting the competing version by Johnny Desmond.

Ford's version was released on October 17, 1955 and by October 28 had sold 400,000 copies. On November 10, a million copies had been sold; two million were sold by December 15.

In the United Kingdom, Ford's version competed with versions by Frankie Laine, which was not released in the US but sold well in the UK, and Edmund Hockridge. Ford's version was the most successful of the three, spending four weeks at No. 1 in the UK Singles Chart in January and February 1956.

On March 25, 2015, Ford's version of the song was added to the Library of Congress's National Recording Registry in recognition of its "cultural, artistic and/or historical significance to American society and the nation’s audio legacy."

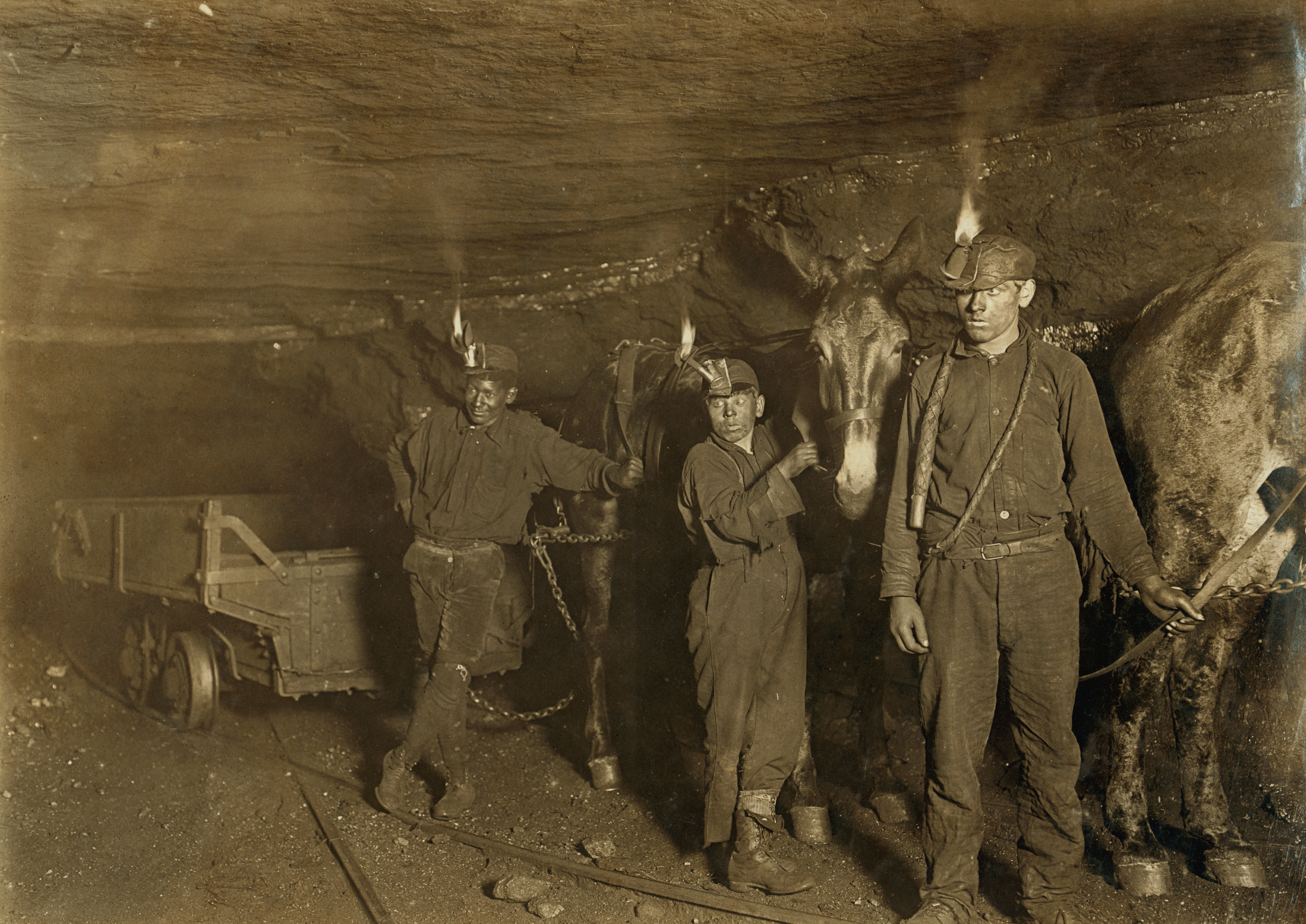
Child coal miners in West Virginia, 1908

== Other versions ==
The song has been recorded or performed in concert by a wide variety of musicians:

- 1955: The Weavers performed the song on their concert album The Weavers at Carnegie Hall.
- 1955: Red Sovine recorded the song, released on the Brunswick label.
- 1955: B.B. King & His Orchestra recorded on RPM Records.
- 1955: Larry Cross recorded on the Embassy label.
- 1955: Marvin & The Chirps recorded on the Tip Top label.
- 1955: Sung live by Elvis Presley on December 17, 1955, at the Municipal Auditorium in Shreveport Louisiana, but never recorded.
- 1956: Ewan MacColl with Brian Daly recorded on Topic Records.
- 1956: Michael Holliday recorded the song on the Columbia label.
- 1956: Eddy Arnold version released on the compilation album Dozen Hits, RCA Victor.
- 1957: The Platters recorded the song, released on the Mercury Records EP Millioniéme.
- 1960: Bo Diddley released a version on his album Bo Diddley Is a Gunslinger.
- 1972: C.C.S. recorded the song on the RAK label. The version peaked at No. 54 in the UK.
- 1976: A country rock version by the Don Harrison Band peaked at No. 47 on the Billboard Hot 100 in June 1976. and number 53 in Australia.
- 1987: Johnny Cash released a country version on his album Johnny Cash Is Coming to Town.
- 1990: A rendition of the song by Eric Burdon was used for the opening to the comedy film Joe Versus the Volcano. Recorded in the early 1980s, it was not released until 1998 on the album Nightwinds Dying which is a different arrangement from the one heard in the film. In 1992, he recorded another version, which was released as the only studio track on the live album Access All Areas in 1993.
- 2010: The Alexandrov Ensemble recorded a version in their album Made in Paris, Vol. 2 in 2010.
- 2012: Tim Armstrong recorded a version as a part of his Tim Timebomb and Friends project.
- 2012: The Dandy Warhols recorded a version on their album This Machine.
- 2014: Gary Clail recorded a version on his album Nail it to the Mast.
- 2021: Geoff Castellucci. recorded the song in the distinctive deep bass voice

=== Foreign-language versions ===
- 1956: Armand Mestral released a version with French lyrics under the title "Seize Tonnes", with a more cheerful ending.
- 1956–1957: A German version of the song did not translate the original lyrics, but rather rewrote them entirely, under the title "Sie hieß Mary-Ann". This was released in several versions on German record labels in 1956 and 1957, most notably by Ralf Bendix, and Freddy Quinn on his album "Freddy" recorded on Polydor.
- 1958: Chang Loo recorded a Chinese version that was re-released in 2017 on album Songs by Chang Loo Universal Records.
- 1960: Spanish version "16 Toneladas" was recorded by the Spanish singer José Guardiola and became a hit in Spain and Latin America in 1960.
- 1971: Brazilian composer Roberto Neves wrote the Portuguese version "Dezesseis Toneladas", first recorded by Noriel Vilela in 1971, this version is a samba with happy lyrics unrelated to the subject of the original.
- 1972: Olavi Virta with Triola Orchestra released a version with Finnish lyrics by Reino Helismaa under the title "Päivän työ" in 1956 (Triola, T 4249), for the 1972 album Olavi Virran Parhaat 3. (Sävel, SÄLP 717).
- 1972: Czech singer Josef Laufer released cover version of the song under the title "Šestnáct tun" in 1974.
- 1986: Adriano Celentano released an Italian-language version "L'Ascensore".
- 1998: Hungarian rock band Republic recorded a cover version in 1998 called "Tizenhat tonna feketeszén" ("16 tons black coal") on their album Üzenet (Message). Republic's lyrics uses lines from a Hungarian campfire song, a more literal translation of the original ballad.
- 2018: Polish version, called Szesnaście ton has become popular among the local sea shanty bands. Because of that the song is mistakenly treated as sea shanty classic in Poland.

== In popular culture ==
- In The Simpsons episode "Bart Gets an Elephant" (season 5, episode 17), "Sixteen Tons" is being played on the radio as Bart is forced by Marge to do housework.
- In 2023, it was included on the soundtrack of the Wes Anderson film Asteroid City..
- It is also part of the soundtrack for season 5, episode 3, of the TV series Fargo.
- Ford's version, along with Kenny Dorham's recording of "Alone Together" which appears in the same episode, are the first uses of pre-existing recorded music in the Game of Thrones series or its spinoff TV shows.
