= Molly O'Day (singer) =

American country music singer-songwriter (1923–1987)

- Birth name: Lois LaVerne Williamson
- Also known as: Dixie Lee, Mountain Fern
- Born: July 9, 1923; Pike County, Kentucky, U.S.
- Died: December 5, 1987 (aged 64); Huntington, West Virginia, U.S.
- Genres: Country
- Occupation: Vocalist
- Years active: 1940–1951

Molly O'Day (July 9, 1923 – December 5, 1987) was an American country music vocalist. O'Day was inducted into the West Virginia Music Hall of Fame in 2007.

== Early life ==
Lois LaVerne Williamson was born on a farm in Pike County, Kentucky, United States, to Joseph and Hester Williamson. Her father supported the family as a coalminer. Neither of her parents played music but Lois got together with her two brothers, Cecil and Joe, to practice singing and playing. Lois and her two brothers, who called themselves Skeets and Duke, began performing at local dances.

In 1939, Skeets was hired to perform in a radio band: Ervin Staggs and His Radio Ramblers at WCHS, Charleston, West Virginia. One of the more famous members of the group was Johnnie Bailes. That same year Molly also joined the Radio Ramblers as a vocalist under the pseudonym Mountain Fern. She worked with a banjoist called Murphy McClees and changed her name to Dixie Lee Williamson. Within a couple of months, she and her two brothers quit and moved to Williamson, West Virginia, to perform at a local radio station. In 1940, Lois and her two brothers moved to Beckley, West Virginia, to join the Happy Valley Boys, led by Johnnie Bailes. The band did not make much money and it disintegrated in the fall of 1940.

== Professional career ==
In 1940, Lois applied for the position as a vocalist in the band Lynn Davis and His Forty-Niners, who had performed on WHIS in Bluefield, West Virginia for the past four years. A few months later, on April 5, 1941, Lynn Davis and Lois Williamson were married. The Forty-Niners appeared on several locations in the southeast and during one gig in Birmingham, Alabama, Hank Williams performed with the group. In 1941, Lois changed her name to Molly O'Day, as there was already a singer named Dixie Lee. In 1945, Davis decided to change the band's name to the Cumberland Mountain Folks.

The new band became a hot act. In 1946, the head of Acuff-Rose, Fred Rose heard Molly sing "Tramp on the Street", a Grady Cole song she learned from Williams. Rose arranged a recording contract with Columbia Records. Molly O'Day and The Cumberland Mountain Folks made their first recordings on December 16, 1946. On these first recordings, Mac Wiseman appeared on bass. During her first years as a recording artist, Molly O'Day's popularity increased, but she started to have doubts about her life's choice. By 1951, she had made her last recording session for Columbia Records.

== Later years ==
Although O'Day recorded albums for Bob Mooney's Rem label (later reissued on Starday) and GRS Records in the 1960s, she preferred to sing in churches and do evangelistic work. Both the Smithsonian Institution and Ralph Stanley tried without success to get her back onstage. In February 1974, Molly and Lynn started a program on a Christian radio station in Huntington, West Virginia, featuring gospel recordings.

== Death ==
In the 1980s, her health began to deteriorate after she was diagnosed with cancer. She died on December 5, 1987, aged 64, at the Cabell Huntington Hospital in Huntington, West Virginia. She was survived by her husband Lynn Davis.

== Sources ==
- Ivan M.Tribe, Liner Notes, Booklet, Bear Family Records.
