= I Am a Pilgrim =

Traditional Christian hymn from the US

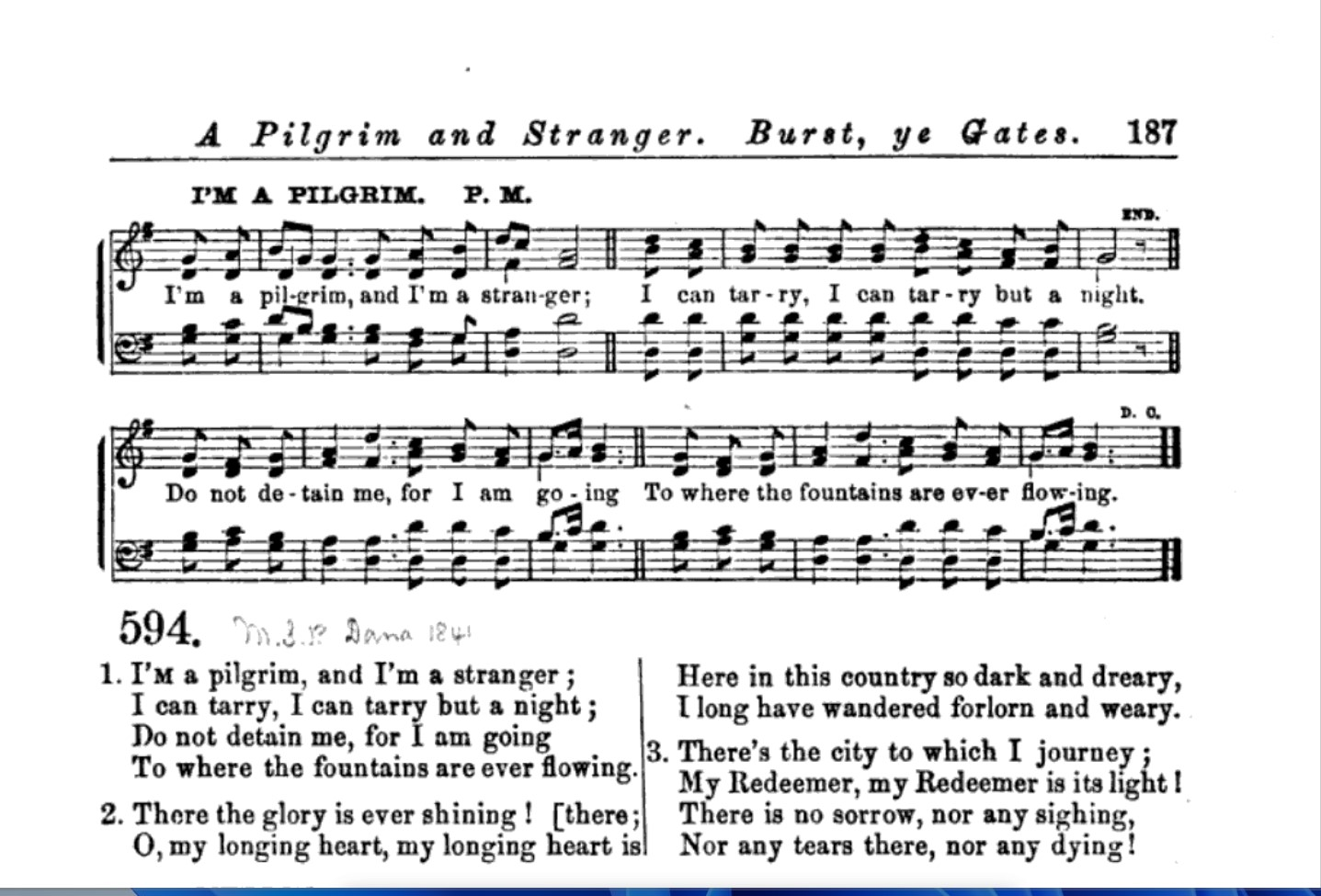
Early version of "I am a Pilgrim" lyrics and music from 1869 hymn book

"I Am a Pilgrim" is a traditional Christian hymn from the United States, first documented in the mid-19th century. It forms part of the repertoire of gospel, folk, and bluegrass artists.

The song combines elements from an "[o]ld hymn entwined with Poor Wayfaring Stranger (Sacred Harp - 1844). It appears in The Southern Zion's Songster (1864) and in Hymns For the Camp (1862)." The song references or alludes to several Bible passages, including the refrain, "I am a pilgrim and a stranger" which alludes to 1 Peter 2:11 and Hebrews 11:13 and also the lyric "If I could touch the hem of his garment" which references Matthew 9:20 where a woman touches the hem of Jesus' robe and is healed. In July 1924 the song was first recorded by Norfolk Jubilee Quartet, an African American group. Prominent musicians such as Bill Monroe, The Byrds, Johnny Cash, and Merle Travis have recorded the song.
