= Kennedy Jones (musician) =

American songwriter

- Born: August 1, 1900; Muhlenberg County, Kentucky, U.S.
- Died: September 1, 1990 (aged 90)
- Occupation: Musical writer
- Instrument: Guitar

Kennedy Jones or Jonesey (1 August 1900 – 6 September 1990) was an American guitarist and music writer.

He was born on a farm in Muhlenberg County, Kentucky. He received his inspiration from his mother Alice who played several instruments. He married Irene Hicks, a pianist, and they performed together early in his career. He claimed to be the first guitarist to play using a thumbpick - at a square dance in 1918. Previously thumbpicks had been used only for the banjo or Hawaiian guitar. He also played the fiddle and declined to join Merle Travis's band The Drifting Pioneers.

Jones composed the thumbpickers anthem "Cannonball Rag," but when Travis recorded the tune in the 1940s, the latter received the credit.

In 1939 Jones moved to Chicago. He played in several bands, one which included his sons, Donald and Kennedy Jr. His daughter Farre Lee too was an accomplished guitarist/singer, who regularly performed on radio station WLW. In the 1950s Jones moved to Cincinnati close to his daughter.

Travis, Mose Rager and Ike Everly all claim to have been influenced by Jonesey. All four men were honored by the construction of The Four Legends Fountain in Drakesboro, Kentucky.

He is buried at Bridgetown cemetery, Cincinnati, Ohio.

His youngest son Donald E. Jones and his eldest son Kennedy, played alongside each other on the TV program The Midwestern Hayride. His daughter, known as Lee Jones, sang on the program. She was known as the Yodeling Cowgirl.
