= Merle Travis =

American country/Western singer-songwriter and musician (1917–1983)

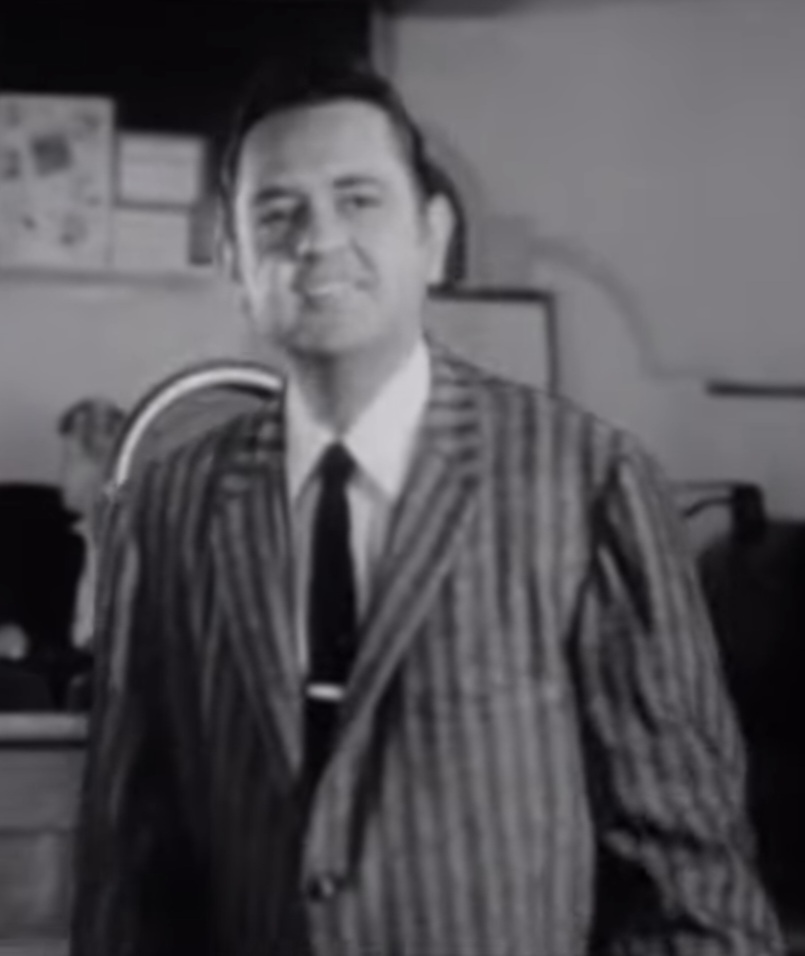
- Merle Travis in Five Minutes to Live (1961)

Background information
- Born: Merle Robert Travis; November 29, 1917; Rosewood, Kentucky, U.S.
- Died: October 20, 1983 (aged 65) Tahlequah, Oklahoma, U.S.
- Genres: Country, Western swing, blues, folk, gospel, Americana
- Occupations: Musician, songwriter
- Instrument: Guitar
- Years active: 1936–1983
- Labels: King, Capitol, CMH

Merle Robert Travis (November 29, 1917 – October 20, 1983) was an American country and western singer, songwriter, actor, and guitarist. Born in Rosewood, Kentucky, his songs' lyrics were often about the lives and the economic exploitation of American coal miners. Among his many well-known songs and recordings are "Sixteen Tons", "Re-Enlistment Blues", "I Am a Pilgrim", and "Dark as a Dungeon". He is best known today, though, for his unique guitar style, still called Travis picking by guitarists, as well as his interpretations of the rich musical traditions of his native Muhlenberg County, Kentucky. Travis picking is a syncopated style of guitar fingerpicking rooted in ragtime music in which alternating chords and bass notes are plucked by the thumb, while melodies are plucked by the index finger. He was inducted into the Nashville Songwriters Hall of Fame in 1970 and elected to the Country Music Hall of Fame in 1977.

He is considered by some to be one of the most influential guitarists of the 20th century.

== Biography ==
=== Early years ===
Merle Travis was born and raised in Muhlenberg County, Kentucky, which inspired many of his original songs; he specifically mentions Ebenezer, Kentucky, in "Dark as a Dungeon" on the 1947 album Folk Songs of the Hills. (This is the same coal-mining county mentioned in John Prine's song "Paradise".) He became interested in the guitar early in life, and first played one made by his brother. Travis reportedly saved his money to buy a guitar for which he had window-shopped for some time.

Merle developed his guitar-playing style out of the native, western Kentucky fingerpicking tradition. Among its early practitioners was Black country blues guitarist Arnold Shultz. Shultz taught his style to several local musicians, including Kennedy Jones, who passed it on to other guitarists, notably Mose Rager, a part-time barber and coal miner, and Ike Everly, the father of the Everly Brothers. Their thumb and index fingerpicking method created a solo style that blended lead lines picked by the finger and rhythmic bass patterns picked or strummed by the thumb. This technique captivated many guitarists in the region and was the main inspiration to young Travis. Travis acknowledged his debt to both Rager and Everly, and appears with Rager on the DVD Legends of Country Guitar (Vestapol, 2002).

At the age of 18, Travis performed "Tiger Rag" on a local radio amateur show in Evansville, Indiana, leading to offers of work with local bands. In 1937, fiddler Clayton McMichen hired Travis to be the guitarist in his Georgia Wildcats. He later joined the Drifting Pioneers, a Chicago-area gospel quartet that moved to WLW radio in Cincinnati, the major country music station north of Nashville. Travis' style amazed everyone at WLW, and he became a popular member of their barn dance radio show, the Boone County Jamboree, when it began in 1938. He performed on various weekday programs, often working with other WLW acts, including Louis Marshall "Grandpa" Jones, the Delmore Brothers, (in Alton Delmore's book Truth Is Stranger than Publicity on pages 274–275, Alton describes how he taught Merle Travis how to read and write music) Hank Penny and Joe Maphis, all of whom became lifelong friends.

In 1943, Grandpa Jones and he recorded for Cincinnati used-record dealer Syd Nathan, who had founded a new label, King Records. Because WLW barred their staff musicians from recording, Travis and Jones used the pseudonym the Sheppard Brothers. Their recording of "You'll Be Lonesome Too" was the first to be released by King Records, which subsequently became known for its country recordings by the Delmore Brothers and Stanley Brothers, as well as rhythm-and-blues musicians Hank Ballard, Wynonie Harris, and most notably, James Brown.

With the threat of being drafted during World War II, Travis enlisted in the US Marine Corps. His stint as a marine was very brief, and he returned to Cincinnati. When the Drifting Pioneers left radio station WLW, leaving a half-hour hole in the schedule, Merle, Grandpa Jones, and the Delmore Brothers formed a gospel group called the Brown's Ferry Four. Performing a repertoire of traditional White and Black gospel songs, with Merle singing bass, they became one of the most popular country gospel groups of the time, recording nearly four dozen sides for the King label between 1946 and 1952. The Brown's Ferry Four have been called "possibly the best White gospel group ever."

During this period, Travis appeared in several soundies, an early form of music video intended for visual jukeboxes where customers could view and hear the popular performers of the day. His first soundie was "Night Train to Memphis" with the band Jimmy Wakely and his Oklahoma Cowboys and Girls, including Johnny Bond and Wesley Tuttle, along with Colleen Summers (who later married Les Paul and became Mary Ford). His performance of "Why'd I Fall for Abner" with Carolina Cotton was chosen for inclusion in the 2007 PBS documentary Soundies. Several years later, he recorded a set of Snader Telescriptions, short music videos intended for local television stations needing filler programming. His performances included playful duets with his then-wife, Judy Hayden, as well as several songs from his 1947 album Folk Songs from the Hills (see below).

=== Career peak ===
Travis performed in stage shows and landed bit parts and singing roles in several B Westerns. He recorded for small West Coast labels until 1946, when he signed with Hollywood-based Capitol Records. Early hits such as "Cincinnati Lou", "No Vacancy", "Divorce Me C.O.D.", "Sweet Temptation", "So Round, So Firm, So Fully Packed", and "Three Times Seven", all his own compositions, gave him national prominence, although they did not all showcase the guitar work for which Travis was renowned among his peers. His design for a solid-body electric guitar, built for him by Paul Bigsby with a single row of tuners, is thought to have inspired his longtime pal Leo Fender's design of the famous Broadcaster in 1950. The Travis-Bigsby guitar now resides in the Country Music Hall of Fame Museum in Nashville.

In 1946, Capitol asked him to record an album of folk songs. Travis combined traditional songs and several original compositions recalling his family's days working in the mines. Capitol released the results as the four-disc, 78 rpm box set Folk Songs of the Hills. The album, with Travis accompanied only by his guitar, contains his two most enduring songs, both centered on the lives of coal miners: "Sixteen Tons" and "Dark as a Dungeon".

"Sixteen Tons" became a number-one Billboard country hit for Tennessee Ernie Ford in 1955, and has been recorded many times over the years. Travis and Molly Bee appeared together as guests on November 24, 1960, on NBC's The Ford Show, Starring Tennessee Ernie Ford. The darkly philosophical "Dark as a Dungeon", although never a hit single, became a folk standard during the 1960s folk revival, and has been covered by many artists, including Johnny Cash in his best-selling concert album At Folsom Prison, by Dolly Parton on her 9 to 5 and Odd Jobs album, and by Travis himself, along with the Nitty Gritty Dirt Band in the landmark 1972 album Will the Circle Be Unbroken. In spite of its initial lack of commercial success, Folk Songs of the Hills, with added tracks, has remained in print virtually ever since.

Travis was a popular radio performer throughout the 1940s and '50s. He appeared on many country music television shows, co-hosting a show Merle Travis and Company with his wife, Judy Hayden, around 1953. He was a regular member of the Hollywood Barn Dance broadcast over radio station KNX, Hollywood, and of the Town Hall Party, which was broadcast first as a radio show on KXLA out of Pasadena, California, and later as a TV series from 1953 to 1961. Despite his successes, his personal life became increasingly troubled. A heavy drinker and at times desperately insecure despite a multitude of talents (including prose writing, taxidermy, cartooning, and watch repair), he was involved in a number of violent incidents in California, and he married several times in the course of his life. He suffered from serious stage fright, though amazed fellow performers added that once onstage, he was an effective and even charismatic performer. In spite of his problems, he was respected and admired by his friends and fellow musicians. Longtime Travis fan Doc Watson named his son Merle Watson, and Travis admirer Chet Atkins named his daughter Merle Atkins, in Travis' honor.

Travis' string of 1940s' chart-topping, honky-tonk hits did not continue into the 1950s, despite the reverence of friends Grandpa Jones and Hank Thompson, with whom he toured and recorded. He was lead guitarist in Thompson's Brazos Valley Boys during the time when Billboard rated them the number-one country-western band for 14 years in a row. (Thompson, who could pick Travis-style, even had Gibson design him a Super 400 hollow-body electric guitar identical to the one Travis began using in 1952.) Travis continued recording for Capitol in the 1950s, broadening his repertoire to include new guitar instrumentals, blues, and boogie numbers. His up-tempo single "Merle's Boogie Woogie" showed him working with multitrack disc recording at the same time as Les Paul.

He found greater popularity after appearing in 1953's hugely popular and multiple Academy Award-winning movie From Here to Eternity, singing and playing "Reenlistment Blues" and following the success of his friend Tennessee Ernie Ford's million-selling rendition of "Sixteen Tons" in 1955. His reputation as a folk-inspired singer-composer and guitarist grew after the release in 1956 of the album The Merle Travis Guitar, the reissue of Folk Songs of the Hills with four additional tracks under the title Back Home in 1957, and Walkin' the Strings in 1960, the latter two of which won five-star ratings from Rolling Stone. His career acquired a second wind during the American folk music revival in the late 1950s and early 1960s, leading to appearances at clubs, folk festivals, and Carnegie Hall as a guest of Lester Flatt and Earl Scruggs in 1962. In the mid-1960s, he moved to Nashville and joined the Grand Ole Opry. During this time, he became Johnny Cash's close friend and occasional hunting partner.

=== Guitar style ===
Merle Travis is now acknowledged as one of the most influential American guitarists of the 20th century. His unique guitar style inspired many guitarists who followed, most notably Chet Atkins, who first heard Travis's radio broadcasts on Cincinnati's WLW Boone County Jamboree in 1939 while living with his father in rural Georgia. Among the many other guitarists influenced by Travis are Scotty Moore, Earl Hooker, Lonnie Mack, Doc Watson, and Marcel Dadi. His son, Thom Bresh (1948–2022), had continued playing in Travis's style on a custom-made Langejans Dualette.

Although his early tutors were among the first to use the thumb pick in guitar playing, freeing the fingers to pick melody, Travis' style, according to Chet Atkins, went on in musical directions "never dreamt about" by his predecessors. His trademark mature style incorporated elements from ragtime, blues, boogie, jazz, and Western swing, and was marked by rich chord progressions, harmonics, slides and bends, and rapid changes of key. He could shift quickly from fingerpicking to flatpicking in the midst of a number by gripping his thumb pick like a flat pick. In his hands, the guitar resembled a full band. As his son Thom Bresh puts it, on first hearing his father as a child, "I thought it was just the coolest sound, because it sounded like a whole bunch of instruments coming from one guitar. In it, I heard rhythm parts, I heard melodies, I heard chords, and all this wrapped up in one." Equally at home on acoustic and electric guitar, Travis was one of the first to exploit the full range of techniques and sonorities available on the electric guitar.

Though Chet Atkins was the most prominent guitarist to be inspired by Merle Travis, the two players' styles were significantly different. As Atkins explained, "While I play alternate bass strings, which sounds more like a stride piano style, Merle played two bass strings simultaneously on the one and three beats, producing a more exciting solo rhythm, in my opinion. It was somewhat reminiscent of the great old Black players." The resemblance was no coincidence; Travis himself acknowledged the influence of Black guitarists such as Blind Blake, the foremost ragtime and blues guitarist of the late 1920s and early 1930s.

Guitarist Marcel Dadi explains and exemplifies Travis' style on his DVD The Guitar of Merle Travis, which includes videos of Travis performing "John Henry" and "Nine Pound Hammer", and includes transcriptions of Travis solos in tablature.

=== Late career ===
After a career dip during which he struggled to overcome alcohol and drug abuse, Travis put his career back on track in the 1970s. He appeared frequently on such country music TV shows as The Porter Wagoner Show, The Johnny Cash Show, Austin City Limits, Grand Old Country, and Nashville Swing, and he was featured on the 1972 Nitty Gritty Dirt Band album Will the Circle Be Unbroken, which introduced him to a new generation of roots music enthusiasts. His 1974 album of duets with Chet Atkins, The Atkins - Travis Traveling Show, won a Grammy award in the category "Best Country Instrumental", and a later album Travis Pickin' received another nomination. In 1976, he contributed to the musical score of the Academy Award-winning documentary Harlan County, USA. Toward the end of the 1970s, he signed a new contract with Los-Angeles-based country music label CMH, which launched one of the most prolific recording periods in his career. The many titles that followed included new guitar solo albums, duets with Joe Maphis, a blues album, and a double album tribute to country fiddler Clayton McMichen, with whom he had played in the 1930s.

In 1983, Travis died of a heart attack at his Tahlequah, Oklahoma, home. His body was cremated and his ashes scattered around a memorial erected to him near Drakesboro, Kentucky.

== Legacy ==
Merle Travis easily ranks as one of the most influential guitarists of the 20th century. For proof of this claim, just look to "Travis picking"—a style he took from Western Kentucky to the radio mainstream—which has become one of the most commonly used picking techniques across the whole guitar-playing world.

— Dan Orkin of Reverb.com (December 29, 2017)

Merle Travis and his Gibson Super 400 at the Country Music Hall of Fame

Many of Travis' original LP albums are now available on CD, and his posthumous discography continues to grow due in large part to the efforts of independent labels. In 1993, Rounder Records released a live concert album Merle Travis in Boston, 1959 that shows Travis' singing and guitar work still at its peak. In 1994, Bear Family Records released a major retrospective of his work and career that includes much previously unreleased material, Guitar Rags and a Too Fast Past, a five-CD box with an 80-page booklet authored by Rich Kienzle, who interviewed many of Travis' contemporaries. The Country Routes label has issued several discs of transcriptions of his radio broadcasts of the 1940s and 1950s. Vestapol and Bear Family released several DVDs recently that collect many of his music videos and television appearances. In 1996, he was an honoree of the two-hour television special An Evening of Country Greats: A Hall of Fame Celebration and two classic Travis performances are included in the 2001 four-part PBS television documentary American Roots Music, which is available in CD and DVD formats.

== Discography ==
=== Albums ===
Year	Album	US Country	Label
1947	Folk Songs of the Hills		Capitol
1956	The Merle Travis Guitar (Instrumental Album)		Capitol
1957	Back Home (LP reissue of Folk Songs of the Hills plus some songs not released before)		Capitol
1960	Walkin' the Strings (Acoustic instrumentals and songs recorded in the 1940s and 50s)		Capitol
1962	Travis (Compilation of songs recorded in the 1940s and 50s)		Capitol
1963	Songs of the Coal Mines		Capitol
1964	Merle Travis and Joe Maphis		Capitol
1967	The Best of Merle Travis		Capitol
1967	Our Man from Kentucky		Hilltop
1968	Strictly Guitar (Instrumental Album)		Capitol
1969	Great Songs of the Delmore Brothers (with Johnny Bond)		Capitol
1974	Merle's Boogie Woogie + 3 (with Ray Campi)		Rollin' Rock
1974	The Atkins - Travis Traveling Show (with Chet Atkins)	30	RCA Victor
1976	Guitar Player		Shasta
1979	Country Guitar Giants (with Joe Maphis)		CMH
1979	The Merle Travis Story: 24 Greatest Hits		CMH
1980	Light Singin' and Heavy Pickin		CMH
1980	Guitar Standards		CMH
1981	Travis Pickin' (Instrumental Album)		CMH
1982	Country Guitar Thunder (1977–1981) (with Joe Maphis)		CMH
1982	The Clayton McMichen Story (with Mac Wiseman)		CMH
1982	Farm and Home Hour (with Grandpa Jones) (includes the 1981 re-recording of the instrumental "Rose Time")		CMH

=== Posthumous albums ===
Year	Album	Label
1986	Rough, Rowdy and Blue	CMH Records
1991	Merle Travis Unreleased Radio Transcriptions 1944–1949	Country Routes
1994	Guitar Rags and a Too Fast Past (5 CD-Set)	Bear Family
1995	Country Hoedown Shows & Films	Country Routes
1995	Unissued Radio Shows (1944–1948)	Country Routes
1998	Turn Your Radio On (1944–1965)	Country Routes
2002	The Very Best of Merle Travis	Varèse Sarabande
2003	Boogie Woogie Cowboy 1944–1956	Country Routes
2003	In Boston 1959	Rounder

=== Selected compilations and reissues ===
Year	Album	Label
1990	The Best of	Rhino
1993	Folk Songs of the Hills: Back Home/Songs of the Coalminers	Bear Family
1995	Guitar Retrospective (instrumental compilation album)	CMH
2000	The Best of Merle Travis: Sweet Temptation 1946–1953	Razor & Tie
2002	Sixteen Tons	ASV Living Era
2003	Hot Pickin	Proper Records
2005	I Am a Pilgrim	Country Stars
2008	Merle Travis: The Definitive Collection	Delta Leisure Group
2008	Legend of Merle Travis	Country Stars

=== Notes on the recordings ===
- The 1956 and 1968 Capitol albums are collections of unaccompanied electric guitar solos.
- The 1957 Capitol LP album Back Home contains the 8 tracks of the 1947 box set Folk Songs of the Hills together with four previously unreleased tracks; the 1996 remastered CD reissue of this album, which reverts to the original title, adds a further unreleased track.
- The 1960 Capitol album consists of unaccompanied acoustic guitar solos with a few vocals.
- The Capitol albums Back Home, Walkin' the Strings, and The Best of Merle Travis were awarded the top (five-star) rankings in the Rolling Stone Record Guide
- The 1974 album with Chet Atkins received a Grammy Award for Best Country Instrumental
- The 1979 CMH CD consists of late-period recordings, tracked over two days in New Mexico four years before Travis' death
- The 1981 LP Travis Pickin' is an acoustic solo guitar album
- On the 1981 CMH LP Rough, Rowdy and Blue Travis accompanies himself on 12-string acoustic guitar
- The 1991, 1995, 1998 and 2003 Country Routes CDs contain remastered radio transcriptions
- The 1993 Bear Family double reissue contains remasterings of all tracks from Back Home (1957) and Songs of the Coalmines (1963)
- The 1993 Bear Family 5-CD collection contains Capitol singles from 1946 to 1955 as well as early singles recorded for small labels such as King and Bel-Tone as well as comprehensive notes by country music historian and Travis authority Rich Kienzle.
- The 2002 Varèse Sarabande CD is a collection of remastered mid-50s live recordings, taken from appearances on Jimmy Wakely's radio show
- The 2003 Proper Records 2-CD album is a compilation of remastered recordings from 1943 to 1952 accompanied by a 15-page booklet listing recording dates and personnel. Includes rare Sheppard Brothers and Browns Ferry Four tracks.
- The 2003 Rounder Records CD is a concert recording of songs accompanied on acoustic guitar
- The 2008 2-CD Delta Leisure Group album is a digitally remastered compilation of recordings from the 1940s and 1950s.

=== Singles ===
Year	Single	US Country
1946	"Cincinnati Lou"	2
1946	"No Vacancy"	3
1946	"Divorce Me C.O.D."	1
1946	"Missouri"	5
1947	"So Round, So Firm, So Fully Packed"	1
1947	"Sweet Temptation"	5
1947	"Steel Guitar Rag"	4
1947	"Three Times Seven"	4
1947	"Fat Gal"	4
1948	"Merle's Boogie Woogie"	7
1948	"Kentucky Means Paradise"	9
1948	"Crazy Boogie"	11
1949	"What a Shame"	13
1955	"Wildwood Flower" (w/ Hank Thompson)	5
1966	"John Henry, Jr."	44

== Music DVDs ==
- 1994 Rare Performances 1946–1981, Vestapol (with 36-page booklet)
- 2002 Legends of Country Guitar, Vestapol (with Chet Atkins, Doc Watson and Mose Rager)
- 2003 More Rare Performances 1946–1981, Vestapol (with 21-page booklet)
- 2005 At Town Hall Party, Bear Family

== Music films ==
1. Soundies Distributing Corporation (1946)

- "Night Train to Memphis"
- "Silver Spurs"
- "Texas Home"
- "Old Chisholm Trail"
- "Catalogue Cowboy"
- "Why'd I Fall for Abner" (with Carolina Cotton)
- "No Vacancy" (with the Bronco Busters and Betty Devere)

2. Snader Transcriptions (1951)

- "Spoonin' Moon" (with the Westerners and Judy Hayden)
- "Too Much Sugar for a Dime" (with the Westerners and Judy Hayden)
- "I'm a Natural Born Gamblin' Man" (with the Westerners)
- "Petticoat Fever" (with the Westerners)
- "Sweet Temptation" (with the Westerners)
- "Nine Pound Hammer" (with acoustic guitar)
- "Lost John" (with acoustic guitar)
- "Muskrat" (with acoustic guitar)
- "John Henry" (with acoustic guitar)
- "Dark as a Dungeon" (with acoustic guitar)

== Filmography ==
=== Film appearances as musical performer ===
- 1944: I'm from Arkansas - Musician (uncredited)
- 1944: The Old Texas Trail - Guitar and Banjo Player (uncredited) (U.K. title: Old Stagecoach Line)
- 1945: Montana Plains (Short) - Musician
- 1945: When the Bloom is on the Sage (Short) - Himself
- 1945: Why Did I Fall for Abner? (Short) - Vocalist-Lead Guitarist
- 1945 Texas Home (with Carolina Cotton) - Himself - Lead Singer-Guitarist
- 1946: Roaring Rangers (U.K. title False Hero) - Guitar Player Travis (with the Bronco Busters)
- 1946: Galloping Thunder (U.K. title On Boot Hill) - Guitar Player (with the Bronco Busters)
- 1946: Lone Star Moonlight (U.K. title Amongst the Thieves) - Himself (with the Merle Travis Trio)
- 1946: Old Chisholm Trail (Short) - Vocalist
- 1947: Silver Spurs (Short) - Vocalist-Guitarist
- 1951: Cyclone Fury - Guitar Player (with the Bronco Busters)
- 1953: From Here to Eternity - Sal Anderson (vocal with acoustic guitar)
- 1966: That Tennessee Beat - Larry Scofield

=== Other film appearances ===
- 1945: Beyond the Pecos - Slim Jones (uncredited)
- 1961: Door-to-Door Maniac (U.S. video title Last Blood) - Max
- 1962: The Night Rider (TV Short) - Kentucky
- 1982: Honkytonk Man - Texas Playboy No. 3 (final film role)

=== Original film music ===
- Harlan County, USA (1976)

=== An Acknowledged Influence ===
- Mose Rager. Mose's Blues - MOSE RAGER MOSE'S BLUES (1979)

== Bibliography ==
- Travis, Merle. 1976. Foreword to Country Roots: the Origins of Country Music by Douglas B. Green. New York : Hawthorn Books. ISBN 0-8015-1781-8, ISBN 0-8015-1778-8 pbk
- Travis, Merle. 1979. "Recollections of Merle Travis: 1944–1955" (Parts 1 & 2). 1979. John Edwards Memorial Foundation Quarterly, Vol. XV, Nos. 54 and 55, pp. 107–114; 135–143.
- Travis, Merle. 1955. "The Saga of Sixteen Tons", United Mine Workers Journal, December 1, 1955.
- "Merle Travis on Home Ground", Interview with Hedy West in Sing Out, Vol. 25, no. 1, pp. 20–26.
- "Interview: Merle Travis Talking with Mark Humphrey" (Parts 1 to 4). 1981–1982. Old Time Music nos. 36–39, pp. 6–10; 20–24; 14–18; 22–25.
- Kienzle, Rich, 2004. "Merle Travis". In Paul Kingsbury, ed., The Encyclopedia of Country Music: the Ultimate Guide to the Music. New York: Oxford University Press. ISBN 978-0-19-517608-7, ISBN 0-19-517608-1
- Gold, Jude. 2006. "The secrets of Travis picking: Thom Bresh passes on the lessons of his legendary father, Merle Travis," Guitar Player, April 1, 2006.
- Eatherly, Pat Travis. 1987. In Search of My Father. Broadman Press. ISBN 0-8054-5727-5, ISBN 978-0-8054-5727-8
- Dicaire, David. 2007. The First Generation of Country Music Stars: Biographies of 50 Artists Born Before 1940. Jefferson, North Carolina: McFarland & Company. ISBN 0-7864-3021-4
- Wolfe, Charles K. 1996. Kentucky Country: Folk and Country Music of Kentucky. University Press of Kentucky. ISBN 0-8131-0879-9, ISBN 978-0-8131-0879-7.
