= Jack Elliott (album) =

1964 American folk music album

Studio album by Ramblin' Jack Elliott
- Released: 1964
- Genre: Folk
- Label: Vanguard

Ramblin' Jack Elliott chronology
Country Style (1962)	Jack Elliott (1964)	Young Brigham (1968)

Jack Elliott is an album by American folk musician Ramblin' Jack Elliott, released in 1964. It was his only principal release on the Vanguard label.

Bob Dylan appears playing harmonica as "Tedham Porterhouse".

Another album titled Jack Elliott was released by Everest Archive of Folk Music in the 1960s and has since been reissued on CD by Tradition / Rykodisc. It has a different track list.

== Reception ==
Professional ratings
Review scores
Source	Rating
Allmusic	4.5/5 stars
Record Mirror	3/5 stars

Writing for Allmusic, music critic Ronnie D. Lankford, Jr. wrote the album "...a listener doesn't have to check out but three or four tracks on Jack Elliott to find out what an original oddball he is... Jack Elliott manages to pay its respects to public domain material while still being entertaining."

== Reissues ==
- Jack Elliott was reissued with additional live tracks as a double LP and on CD by Vanguard Records in 1976 and 1998 as The Essential Ramblin' Jack Elliott.
- All the songs from Jack Elliott were reissued on CD by Vanguard in 2000 on Best of the Vanguard Years.
- Seven tracks from Jack Elliott were reissued on CD by Vanguard in 2007 on Vanguard Visionaries.
- Jack Elliott, with its original track listing, was reissued by Vanguard on vinyl as VRS-9151 in 2014.

== Track listing ==
All songs Traditional unless otherwise noted.

=== Side one ===
1. "Roving Gambler"
2. "Will the Circle Be Unbroken"
3. "Diamond Joe"
4. "Guabi Guabi" (a Zimbabwean love song originally recorded by George Sibanda which talks about love and gifts to his lover)
5. "Sowing on the Mountains"
6. "Roll On Buddy"

=== Side two ===
1. "1913 Massacre" (Woody Guthrie)
2. "House of the Rising Sun"
3. "Shade of the Old Apple Tree"
4. "Black Snake Moan"
5. "Portland Town" (Derroll Adams)
6. "More Pretty Girls"

== Personnel ==
- Ramblin' Jack Elliott – vocals, harmonica, guitar
- Bill Lee – bass on "Roving Gambler", "Will the Circle Be Unbroken", "Roll On Buddy" and "Black Snake Moan"
- Erik Darling – banjo on "Will the Circle Be Unbroken" and "Sowing on the Mountain"
- John Hammond – mouth harp on "Roll On Buddy"
- Eric Weissberg – bass on "Guabi Guabi"
- John Herald – guitar on "Guabi Guabi"
- Ian Tyson – guitar on "Guabi Guabi"
- Monte Dunn – guitar on "Guabi Guabi"
- Sylvia Fricker - percussion on "Guabi Guabi"
- Tedham Porterhouse (Bob Dylan) – mouth harp on "Will the Circle Be Unbroken"

Technical

- Jules Halfant - design
- David Gahr, Jim Marshall - photography
