= Best of the Vanguard Years (Ramblin' Jack Elliott album) =

Greatest hits album by Ramblin' Jack Elliott
- Released: October 31, 2000
- Genre: Folk
- Length: 72:13
- Label: Vanguard

Ramblin' Jack Elliott chronology
The Long Ride (1999)	Best of the Vanguard Years (2000)	The Lost Topic Tapes: Cowes Harbour 1957 (2004)

Best of the Vanguard Years is an album by American folk musician Ramblin' Jack Elliott, released in 2000.

The 1964 Vanguard release Jack Elliott is included in its entirety. Seven tracks from Jack Elliott were also reissued on CD by Vanguard in 2007 on Vanguard Visionaries. More than half of the album includes songs that had not been previously released.

Bob Dylan appears playing harmonica as "Tedham Porterhouse".

== Reception ==
Professional ratings
Review scores
Source	Rating
Allmusic	4/5 stars

Writing for Allmusic, music critic Ronnie D. Lankford Jr. wrote of the album "... even his older material never strikes the listener as out-of-date... For those who want to dig a little deeper into folk music's past, this is a fine selection; for those who aren't familiar with Rambin' Jack Elliott, this is a great place to begin one's acquaintance."

== Track listing ==
All songs Traditional unless otherwise noted.

1. "Roving Gambler" – 3:35
2. "Will the Circle Be Unbroken" – 2:37
3. "Diamond Joe" – 2:58
4. "Guabi Guabi" (Traditional, Jack Elliott) – 4:43
5. "Sowing on the Mountain" – 2:15
6. "Roll on Buddy" – 2:01
7. "1913 Massacre" (Woody Guthrie) – 3:52
8. "House of the Rising Sun" – 3:27
9. "Shade of the Old Apple Tree" – 2:42
10. "Black Snake Moan" – 3:25
11. "Portland Town" (Derroll Adams) – 1:59
12. "More Pretty Girls Than One" – 2:14
13. "Danville Girl" – 2:53
14. "John Hardy" – 2:27
15. "Dark as a Dungeon" (Merle Travis) – 2:53
16. "Hard Ain't It Hard" (Guthrie) – 2:40
17. "Don't Think Twice, It's All Right" (Bob Dylan) – 3:16
18. "I Got A Woman" – 2:33
19. "Railroad Bill" – 3:57
20. "I Never Will Marry" – 2:29
21. "At My Window" – 2:09
22. "Blue Eyed Elaine" – 2:18
23. "Wildwood Flower" (Carter) – 2:25
24. "Ranger's Command" (Guthrie) – 3:32
25. "Willie Moore" – 2:53

== Personnel ==
- Ramblin' Jack Elliott – vocals, harmonica, guitar
- Bill Lee – bass
- Erik Darling – banjo
- John Hammond – mouth harp
- Eric Weissberg – bass
- John Herald – guitar
- Ian Tyson – guitar
- Monte Dunn – guitar
- Tedham Porterhouse (Bob Dylan) – mouth harp
