= South Coast (album) =

Studio album by Ramblin' Jack Elliott
- Released: 1995
- Genre: Folk
- Length: 43:26
- Label: Red House
- Producer: Bob Feldman

Ramblin' Jack Elliott chronology
Kerouac's Last Dream (1981)	South Coast (1995)	Friends of Mine (1998)

South Coast is an album by American folk musician Ramblin' Jack Elliott, released in 1995. It was his first new studio release in over 20 years.

At the Grammy Awards of 1996, South Coast won the Grammy Award for Best Traditional Folk Album.

== Reception ==
Professional ratings
Review scores
Source	Rating
Allmusic	4.5/5 stars

Writing for Allmusic, music critic Burgin Matthews wrote the album "Elliott also reveals himself as one of the few truly enduring figures of the folk era, partly because his music is more honest, and as a result more timeless, than so much of that era's music ... With South Coast, Elliott's legend is irrevocably cemented."

== In popular culture ==
The song "Pastures of Plenty" is featured in Ari Gold's 2008 film Adventures of Power.

== Track listing ==
1. "Pastures of Plenty" (Woody Guthrie) – 2:46
2. "If I Were a Carpenter" (Tim Hardin) – 5:00
3. "Cocaine Blues" (Reverend Gary Davis) – 2:29
4. "I Ain't Got No Home" (Guthrie) – 2:07
5. "Will James" (Ian Tyson) – 2:16
6. "The Buffalo Skinners (On the Trail of the Buffalo)" (Traditional) – 5:24
7. "Rake and Ramblin' Boy" (Derroll Adams) – 2:26
8. "South Coast" (Lillian Bos Ross) – 7:53
9. "Talkin' Dust Bowl" (Guthrie) – 3:03
10. "Mean Old Bed Bug Blues" (Joe Davis) – 3:23
11. "Ludlow Massacre" (Guthrie) – 4:25
12. "San Francisco Bay Blues" (Jesse Fuller) – 2:14

== Personnel ==
- Ramblin' Jack Elliott – vocals, guitar

Production notes:

- Bob Feldman – producer
- Brent Sigmeth – engineer
- Chris Frymire – editing, pre-mastering
- Eric Peltoniemi – associate producer, editing, mixing, pre-mastering
- Paul Baron – mixing
- David Glasser – mastering
- Linda Beauvais – artwork, design
- Michael Crouser – photography
