= The Essential Ramblin' Jack Elliott =

Greatest hits album by Ramblin' Jack Elliott
- Released: 1976
- Genre: Folk
- Label: Vanguard
- Producer: Maynard Solomon

Ramblin' Jack Elliott chronology
Bull Durham Sacks & Railroad Tracks (1970)	The Essential Ramblin' Jack Elliott (1976)	Kerouac's Last Dream (1981)

The Essential Ramblin' Jack Elliott is a compilation album by American folk musician Ramblin' Jack Elliott, released in 1976. It was originally issued as a double LP including Elliot's only Vanguard release Jack Elliott and other live tracks. The album was reissued on CD in 1998.

Professional ratings
Review scores
Source	Rating
Allmusic	5/5 stars

== Track listing ==
All songs Traditional unless otherwise noted.

1. "Roving Gambler" – 3:36
2. "Will the Circle Be Unbroken" – 2:38
3. "Diamond Joe" – 2:58
4. "Guabi Guabi" (Traditional, Jack Elliott) – 4:43
5. "Sowing on the Mountain" – 2:15
6. "Roll on Buddy" – 2:03
7. "1913 Massacre" (Woody Guthrie) – 3:51
8. "House of the Rising Sun" – 3:28
9. "Shade of the Old Apple Tree" – 2:41
10. "Black Snake Moan" – 3:26
11. "Portland Town" (Derroll Adams) – 1:59
12. "More Pretty Girls Than One" – 2:14
  Double LP and CD reissue live tracks:
13. "San Francisco Bay Blues" (Jesse Fuller) – 2:15
14. "Buffalo Skinners" – 4:51
15. "Sadie Brown" – 3:30
16. "Don't Think Twice, It's All Right" (Bob Dylan) – 4:13
17. "Blind Lemon Jefferson" (Lead Belly) – 3:55
18. "Ramblin' Round Your City" (Guthrie) – 3:50
19. "Tennessee Stud" (Jimmy Driftwood) – 4:14
20. "Night Herding Song" – 3:20
21. "Lovesick Blues" (Cliff Friend, Irving Mills) – 3:17
22. "I Belong to Glasgow" (William Fyffe) – 5:31

== Personnel ==
- Ramblin' Jack Elliott – vocals, harmonica, guitar
