= Country Style (disambiguation) =

Country Style is a chain of coffee shops operating primarily in the Canadian province of Ontario.

Country Style may also refer to:

- Country Style (U.S. TV series), a 1950 American musical variety show
- Country Style (album), a 1962 album by Ramblin' Jack Elliott
- Country Style, USA, a 1957–1960 series of 15-minute radio and film programs produced by the U.S. Army
- Country Style (Australian TV series), a 1958 Australian television variety show
- Country Style (1964 Australian TV series)
