= Jack Elliot Sings =

Studio album by Ramblin' Jack Elliott
- Released: 1957
- Recorded: February–March 1956 in Burnham, Buckinghamshire, England
- Genre: Folk
- Label: 77

Ramblin' Jack Elliott chronology
Woody Guthrie's Blues (1956)	Jack Elliot Sings (1957)	The Rambling Boys (1957)

Jack Elliot Sings is an album by American folk musician Ramblin' Jack Elliott, released in Great Britain in 1957. Elliott's name is misspelled on the cover.

== History ==
The original release had his name misspelled and was a 10-inch LP. In 1960, four of the songs were released on an EP titled Jack Elliott.

The album was recorded in February and March 1956 by John R.T. Davis at his home in Burnham, Buckinghamshire, England. It is an obscure release in Elliott's catalog that even collectors aren't aware of.

== Reception ==
Professional ratings
Review scores
Source	Rating
Allmusic	

Writing for Allmusic, music critic Richie Unterberger wrote of the album "There isn't anything here remarkably different from most of Elliott's other vintage folk releases, but it's a good no-frills set..."

== Track listing ==
All song Traditional unless otherwise noted.

=== Side one ===
1. "Alabama Bound"
2. "Good Morning Blues"
3. "Talking Blues"
4. "Rocky Mountain Belle"

=== Side two ===
1. "Jesse Fuller's San Francisco Blues" (Jesse Fuller)
2. "Fifteen Cents"
3. "Mule Skinners" (Jimmie Rodgers, Vaughn Horton)
4. "John Henry"

== Personnel ==
- Ramblin' Jack Elliott – vocals, guitar, harmonica
- June Elliott – banjo (on "Rocky Mountain Belle")
- Liner notes – Alexis Korner
