= Ramblin' Jack Elliott Sings Songs by Woody Guthrie and Jimmie Rodgers =

Studio album by Ramblin' Jack Elliott
- Released: 1960 [*discrepancy - Discogs shows UK album by Columbia being released in 1961]
- Recorded: November 14, 1959
- Genre: Folk
- Length: 65:24 (Reissue)
- Label: Columbia
- Producer: Denis Preston

Ramblin' Jack Elliott chronology
Ramblin' Jack Elliott in London (1959)	Ramblin' Jack Elliott Sings Songs by Woody Guthrie and Jimmie Rodgers (1960)	Jack Elliott Sings the Songs of Woody Guthrie (1960)

Alternative Cover
- Cover of the first American release of the LP

Ramblin' Jack Elliott Sings Songs by Woody Guthrie and Jimmie Rodgers is an album by American folk musician Ramblin' Jack Elliott. It was released in 1960 in Great Britain and in 1962 in the US on the Monitor label. [discrepancy - Discogs shows UK album by Columbia being released in 1961]

== Reception ==
Professional ratings
Review scores
Source	Rating
AllMusic	4/5 stars
The Encyclopedia of Popular Music	3/5 stars
MusicHound Folk: The Essential Album Guide	3/5 stars
The Rolling Stone Album Guide	3/5 stars

AllMusic's Bruce Eder wrote of the reissue: "These versions have a beguiling air of authenticity despite their being recorded long after the point they were written... Elliott covers at least three styles here, with little overlap; it's more than one hour of excellent material that's the equal of any of his various best-of compilations from different labels."

== Reissues ==
- Ramblin' Jack Elliott Sings Songs by Woody Guthrie and Jimmie Rodgers was reissued in 1962 in the US on the Monitor label with a slight title change to Ramblin' Jack Elliott Sings Woody Guthrie and Jimmie Rodgers.
- Ramblin' Jack Elliott Sings Songs by Woody Guthrie and Jimmie Rodgers was reissued on CD in 1994 by Monitor along with Monitor Presents Jack Elliott: Ramblin' Cowboy. It retained the altered title.
- Ramblin' Jack Elliott Sings Songs by Woody Guthrie and Jimmie Rodgers was reissued on CD in 2005 by Monitor with additional tracks and re-titled Ramblin' Jack Elliott Sings Woody Guthrie and Jimmie Rodgers & Cowboy Songs.

== Track listing ==
=== Side one ===
1. "Do-Re-Mi" (Woody Guthrie)
2. "Dead or Alive" (Lonnie Donegan, Guthrie)
3. "Grand Coulee Dam" (Guthrie)
4. "Dust Storm Disaster" (Guthrie)
5. "I Ain't Got No Home" (Guthrie)
6. "So Long (It's Been Good to Know Yuh)" (Guthrie)

=== Side two ===
1. "T for Texas (Blue Yodel No. 1)" (Jimmie Rodgers)
2. "Waiting for a Train" (Rodgers)
3. "Jimmie the Kid" (Rodgers)
4. "Mother, the Queen of My Heart" (Rodgers)
5. "In the Jailhouse Now" (Rodgers)
6. "Whippin' That Old T.B." (Rodgers)

== 2005 Reissue track listing ==
1. "Do-Re-Mi" (Woody Guthrie) – 2:29
2. "Dead or Alive" (Lonnie Donegan, Guthrie) – 3:15
3. "Grand Coulee Dam" (Guthrie) – 2:38
4. "Dust Storm Disaster" (Guthrie) – 3:22
5. "I Ain't Got No Home" (Guthrie) – 2:14
6. "So Long (It's Been Good to Know Yuh)" (Guthrie) – 3:50
7. "T for Texas (Blue Yodel No. 1)" (Jimmie Rodgers) – 3:38
8. "Waiting for a Train" (Rodgers) – 2:27
9. "Jimmie the Kid" (Rodgers) – 2:25
10. "Mother, the Queen of My Heart" (Rodgers) – 3:04
11. "In the Jailhouse Now" (Rodgers) – 2:20
12. "Whippin' That Old T.B." (Rodgers) – 3:40
13. "Rusty Jiggs and Sandy Sam" – 2:53
14. "Get Along, Little Dogies" (Traditional) – 2:00
15. "Sadie Brown" (Jack Elliott) – 2:08
16. "Night Herding Song" (Traditional) – 2:42
17. "Chisholm Trail" (Traditional) – 2:12
18. "Fifteen Cents and a Dollar" – 2:45
19. "Rocky Mountain Belle" (Traditional) – 2:00
20. "Talking Blues" (Traditional) – 2:13
21. "Diamond Joe" (Traditional) – 3:17
22. "In the Willow Garden" – 3:15
23. "I Ride an Old Paint" (Traditional) – 2:15
24. "Jack O'Diamonds" – 2:22

== Personnel ==
- Ramblin' Jack Elliott – vocals, guitar

Technical

- Dick Lazenby - engineer
- Peter Leslie - sleeve design
- Walter Campbell Hanlon - photography
