= Ramblin' Jack Elliott (album) =

Studio album by Ramblin' Jack Elliott
- Released: February 1962
- Genre: Folk
- Label: Prestige/International
- Producer: Kenneth S. Goldstein

Ramblin' Jack Elliott chronology
Songs to Grow On by Woody Guthrie, Sung by Jack Elliott (1961)	Ramblin' Jack Elliott (1962)	Jack Elliott at the Second Fret (1962)

Ramblin' Jack Elliott is an album by American folk musician Ramblin' Jack Elliott, released in February 1962 on the Prestige International label.

== Reception ==
Professional ratings
Review scores
Source	Rating
Allmusic	3/5 stars

In a contemporary review, Paul Nelson of The Little Sandy Review called the album Elliott's "finest American recording." Writing for Allmusic, music critic Richie Unterberger wrote the album "A solidly traditional set of interpretations of standards."

== Reissues ==
- Ramblin' Jack Elliott was reissued along with Jack Elliott Sings the Songs of Woody Guthrie in 1989 as a double LP on the Fantasy label as Hard Travelin'. It was reissued on CD in 1991 with "I Love Her So/I Got a Woman" omitted.

== Track listing ==
=== Side one ===
1. "Sadie Brown" (Jack Elliott)
2. "East Virginia Blues" (Carter)
3. "I Belong to Glasgow" (William Fyffe)
4. "The Cuckoo" (Traditional)
5. "Roll in My Sweet Baby's Arms" (Traditional)
6. "South Coast" (Lillian Bos Ross)

=== Side two ===
1. "San Francisco Bay Blues" (Jesse Fuller)
2. "The Last Letter" (Rex Griffin, Traditional)
3. "I Love Her So/I Got a Woman" (Ray Charles)
4. "Candy Man" (Reverend Gary Davis)
5. "Tramp on the Street" (Grady Cole, Hazel Cole)
6. "Railroad Bill" (Traditional)

== Personnel ==
- Ramblin' Jack Elliott – vocals, harmonica, guitar
- John Herald – guitar
- Ralph Rinzler – mandolin
- Kenneth S. Goldstein – producer
- Rudy Van Gelder - recording and mastering
- Esmond Edwards - photography
