= Riding in My Car =

Children's song by Woody Guthrie

"Riding in My Car" (also called "Car Car" or "The Car Song") is a children's song by Woody Guthrie.

== History and lyrical content ==
I'm a gonna let you blow the horn,
I'm a gonna let you blow the horn,
A oorah, a oorah, a oogah, oogah,
I'll take you riding in my car.

— Woody Guthrie, "Riding in My Car"

Guthrie wrote "Riding in My Car" during a productive period in the 1940s when he was living at Coney Island in New York. "Riding in My Car" was recorded as part of The Asch Recordings in the mid 1940s. It was released on 78 RPM record, then collected on 12" vinyl LP on Guthrie's 1951 album Songs to Grow on, Volume One: Nursery Days. It has since been included on several Guthrie compilation albums.

The song's playful lyrics include onomatopoeia, with the "motorboat" sound (an extended raspberry) imitating a car's engine. Possibly the best known of Guthrie's many children's songs, it remains a family and sing-along standard into the 21st century. "Riding in My Car" is included in the popular sing-along songbook Rise Up Singing.

== In popular culture ==
"Riding in My Car" has been covered by artists including Peter, Paul and Mary on In Concert (1964) and Donovan on What's Bin Did and What's Bin Hid (1965; US title Catch The Wind) (Donovan also performed the song at an October 2012 concert at the Kennedy Center, released on Woody At 100! Live at the Kennedy Center).

Other recordings include performances by Greg & Steve, Ramblin' Jack Elliot (on Songs to Grow On by Woody Guthrie, Sung by Jack Elliott), Odetta, Pete Seeger, Arlo Guthrie, Kidsongs, and Judy Collins.

Bruce Springsteen performed the song at a Woody Guthrie tribute concert at Severance Hall in Cleveland on September 29, 1996, released that year on the record Til We Outnumber 'Em. Bob Dylan performed it at The Gaslight Cafe in 1961. A 1961 performance by Dylan of the song at a private party was made and later released on a bootleg record, The Minneapolis Party Tape.

New York–based author Scott Menchin published a 2012 children's book, Riding in My Car, inspired by the song, and including his illustrations of the lyrics.
