= The Lost Topic Tapes: Cowes Harbour 1957 =

Compilation album by Ramblin' Jack Elliott
- Released: October 26, 2004
- Recorded: May 14, 1957
- Genre: Folk
- Label: Hightone

Ramblin' Jack Elliott chronology
Best of the Vanguard Years (2000)	The Lost Topic Tapes: Cowes Harbour 1957 (2004)	The Lost Topic Tapes: Isle of Wight 1957 (2004)

The Lost Topic Tapes: Cowes Harbour 1957 is an album by American folk musician Ramblin' Jack Elliott, released in 2004. Elliott recorded a number of albums on the Topic label in London in the 1950s. The songs on this compilation are taken from rediscovered tapes found in the British Library in London. They were recorded on a yacht at Cowes Harbour in 1957. Several songs were issued in Britain on Jack Takes the Floor.

== Reception ==
Professional ratings
Review scores
Source	Rating
Allmusic	3/5 stars

Writing for Allmusic, music critic Steve Leggett wrote the album "The sequence here is a fairly typical Elliott set of the time, made up of Guthrie tunes (including a fine version of "Tom Joad"), traditional American folk songs, and other pieces that fit his style... Things get a little affected when Elliott talks between songs, but when he sings, it all works, and his guitar playing is always simple, appropriate, and top-notch."

== Track listing ==
All songs Traditional unless otherwise noted.

1. "Intro" – 0:48
2. "Hard Travelin'" (Woody Guthrie) – 3:57
3. "Big Rock Candy Mountain" – 1:43
4. "Old Rattler" (J. K. Hunter) – 2:18
5. "Talking Columbia Blues" (Guthrie) – 3:06
6. "Streets of Laredo" – 2:27
7. "Jack of Diamonds" – 3:23
8. "Rusty Jiggs & Sandy Sam" – 2:54
9. "Tom Joad" (Guthrie) – 7:25
10. "Acres of Clams" – 2:31
11. "Freight Train" (Elizabeth Cotten) – 1:13
12. "Chisholm Trail" – 1:57
13. "Crawdad Song" – 2:25
14. "Black Girl (aka In the Pines)" – 3:04
15. "Tom Dooley" – 2:16
16. "Rocky Mountain Belle" – 1:30

== Personnel ==
- Ramblin' Jack Elliott – vocals, guitar

Production notes:

- Bruce Bromberg – project supervisor
- Larry Sloven – project supervisor
- Bob Stone – editing, remastering
- Richard Swettenham – engineer
- Bill Leader – assistant engineer
- Dick Reeves – graphic design
- Robert Wylie – liner notes
