= The Lost Topic Tapes: Isle of Wight 1957 =

Compilation album by Ramblin' Jack Elliott
- Released: October 26, 2004
- Recorded: May 14, 1957
- Genre: Folk
- Label: Hightone

Ramblin' Jack Elliott chronology
| The Lost Topic Tapes: Cowes Harbour 1957 (2004) | The Lost Topic Tapes: Isle of Wight 1957 (2004) | I Stand Alone (2006) |

The Lost Topic Tapes: Isle of Wight 1957 is an album by American folk musician Ramblin' Jack Elliott, released in 2004. Elliott recorded a number of albums on the Topic label in London in the 1950s. The songs on this compilation are taken from rediscovered tapes found in the British Library in London. They were recorded on a yacht at Cowes Harbour in 1957. Several songs were issued in Britain on Jack Takes the Floor.

== Reception ==
Professional ratings
Review scores
| Source | Rating |
|---|---|
| Allmusic | 3/5 stars |

Writing for Allmusic, music critic Steve Leggett wrote the album "Brooklyn's most famous folk cowboy, Ramblin' Jack Elliott was part genuine preservationist and part a walking, talking pastiche of Woody Guthrie crossed with a back-porch Appalachian moonshiner. The public act sometimes gets in the way of the fact that Elliott was an excellent interpreter of American traditional folk material, carefully representing its styles and rhythms on guitar and banjo, and he duplicated rural vocal nuances with purposeful precision..."

== Track listing ==
1. "Intro" – 0:49
2. "T for Texas" (Jimmie Rodgers) – 4:08
3. "Howdido" (Woody Guthrie) – 1:49
4. "I Thought I Heard Buddy Bolden Say" (Jelly Roll Morton) – 2:16
5. "Crash on the Highway" (Dorsey M. Dixon) – 2:16
6. "Candy Man" (Reverend Gary Davis) – 1:28
7. "Ballad of John Henry" (Traditional) – 2:21
8. "Car Song" (Guthrie) – 2:13
9. "Roll in My Sweet Baby's Arms" (Traditional) – 3:35
10. "Old Blue" (Traditional) – 2:49
11. "Don't You Leave Me Here" (Guthrie) – 1:35
12. "Why Oh Why" (Guthrie) – 1:54
13. "In the Shade of the Old Apple Tree" (Traditional) – 3:24
14. "Oklahoma Hills" (Guthrie) – 2:11
15. "Rock Island Line" (Traditional) – 5:16
16. "Closing/Railroad Bill" (Traditional) – 0:41

== Personnel ==
- Ramblin' Jack Elliott – vocals, guitar

Production notes:

- Bruce Bromberg – project supervisor
- Larry Sloven – project supervisor
- Richard Swettenham – engineer
- Bill Leader – assistant engineer
- Bob Stone – editing, remastering
- Dick Reeves – graphic design
