= Herbert Gold =

American novelist (1924–2023)

- Born: March 9, 1924; Lakewood, Ohio, U.S.
- Died: November 19, 2023 (aged 99); San Francisco, California, U.S.
- Education: Sorbonne; Columbia University (AB, AM)
- Spouses: Edith Zubrin (m. 1948; div. 1956) Melissa Dilworth (m. 1968; div. 1975)
- Children: 5, including Ari Gold

Herbert Gold (March 9, 1924 – November 19, 2023) was an American novelist, essayist, short story writer and poet. Originally from Cleveland, he studied at Columbia University in New York City, before serving in the U.S. Army in World War II. After the War, he settled in San Francisco, California, but did not become a member of the Beat Generation. A prolific author, he wrote 29 novels and works of essays, short stories and poems in his long life.

== Early life ==
Herbert Gold was born on March 9, 1924, in the Cleveland suburb of Lakewood, Ohio, to a Russian Jewish family. His parents were Samuel S. and Frieda (Frankel) Gold. His father ran a fruit store and later a grocery store. Gold memorialized his hometown in his first book, Birth of a Hero (1951). He attended Taft Elementary and Lakewood High School.

Gold moved to New York City at the age of 17 after several of his poems had been accepted by New York literary magazines. While there, he studied philosophy at Columbia University and became affiliated with the burgeoning Beat Generation, which resulted in a lifelong friendship with writer Allen Ginsberg. Gold's studies were interrupted when he served in the United States Army from 1943 until 1946, during World War II.

In 1946, Gold graduated from Columbia University with a B.A. degree, where he was a member of the Philolexian Society, and an M.A. degree in 1948.

Despite being intertwined with the literary history of San Francisco, which greatly defined the Beat Generation, Gold did not consider himself to have ever been a member of this group of writers. In a 2017 interview with The Washington Post journalist Jeff Weiss, Gold was referred to as a "Beat-adjacent novelist".

== Career ==
Gold won a Fulbright Scholarship (1948–1951) and moved to Paris with his new wife Edith Zubrin, and while in Paris he finished his first novel. He attended classes at the Sorbonne in Paris during his Fulbright Scholarship.

After that, he moved around as he wrote, traveling to Haiti and Detroit, and hitchhiking all over the United States. He finally settled in San Francisco, where he became a fixture in the literary scene. In 1958, Gold taught English literature at Cornell University, as Vladimir Nabokov's successor.

Genesis West (Vol. 6), was published in the Winter of 1964, including an interview of Herbert Gold by Gordon Lish.

Gold's final publication, the poetry collection Fathers Verses Sons: A Correspondence in Poems, co-written with Ari Gold, was published by Rare Bird Books in March 2024.

== Personal life ==
Gold was married to writer and professor Edith Zubrin from 1948 until 1956, with their marriage ending in divorce. Gold had two daughters by this marriage, Ann and Judith. Edith Zubrin died in 2000.

From 1968 until 1975, Gold was married to the daughter of J. Richardson Dilworth, Melissa Dilworth, with whom he had three children: daughter Nina Gold and twin boys Ari Gold and Ethan Gold. After they divorced, Melissa remarried and later became involved with concert promoter Bill Graham. She died with Graham in a helicopter crash in 1991.

In contrast to many in the Beat Generation, Gold was a resident of San Francisco's more conservative, tourist-friendly Russian Hill neighborhood, where he lived in the same apartment for over 60 years. He died there on November 19, 2023, at the age of 99.

== Publications ==
=== Books ===
- Gold, Herbert (1951). Birth of a Hero. Viking Press. ISBN 978-0670169252.
- Gold, Herbert (1955). Room Clerk, Original Title: The Prospect Before Us. Signet Skid-Row.
- Gold, Herbert (1956). The Man Who Was Not With It. Little, Brown. ISBN 0-912697-69-5.
- Gold, Herbert (1959). The Optimist: A Novel. An Atlantic Monthly Press Book. Little, Brown.
- Gold, Herbert (1960). Therefore Be Bold, A Novel. Dial Press.
- Gold, Herbert (1963). Salt: A Novel. Dial Press.
- Gold, Herbert (1966). Fathers: A Novel in the Form of a Memoir. ISBN 0-87795-550-6.
- Gold, Herbert (1969). The Great American Jackpot. Random House.
- Gold, Herbert (1972). My Last Two Thousand Years (autobiography). Random House. ISBN 978-0394470986.
- Gold, Herbert (1973). The Young Prince and the Magic Cone. Doubleday. ISBN 0-385-01519-4.
- Gold, Herbert (1974). Swiftie the Magician. McGraw Hill. ISBN 9780070236455.
- Gold, Herbert (1977). Waiting for Cordelia. New York City, New York: Arbor House. ISBN 9780877951544.
- Gold, Herbert (1979). Slave Trade. New York City, New York: Arbor House. ISBN 978-0877952176.
- Gold, Herbert (1980). He/She. New York City, New York: Arbor House. ISBN 9780877952640.
- Gold, Herbert (1981). Family: A Novel in the Form of a Memoir. Primus library of contemporary Americana. New York City, New York: Arbor House. ISBN 9780877953326.
- Gold, Herbert (1982). True Love. New York City, New York: Arbor House. ISBN 9780877954255.
- Gold, Herbert (1984). Mister White Eyes: A Novel. New York City, New York: Arbor House. ISBN 9780877956365.
- Gold, Herbert (1986). A Girl of Forty. New York City, New York: D.I. Fine. ISBN 9780917657634.
- Gold, Herbert (1991). Best Nightmare on Earth: A Life in Haiti. Jan Morris (introduction). Prentice Hall Press. ISBN 9780133723274.
- Gold, Herbert (1994). Bohemia: Digging the Roots of Cool. Touchstone. ISBN 9780671886080.
- Gold, Herbert (2014). She Took My Arm As If She Loved Me: A Novel. St. Martin's Publishing Group. ISBN 9781466883307.
- Gold, Herbert (2008). Still Alive!: A Temporary Condition (memoir). Arcade Pub. ISBN 9781559708708.
- Gold, Herbert (2015). When a Psychopath Falls in Love. Portland, Oregon: Jorvik Press. ISBN 978-0988412279.
- Father Verses Sons: A Correspondence in Poems, co-written with Ari Gold (2024), Rare Bird Books.

=== Essays and short stories ===
- Gold, Herbert (1960). Love and Like (short stories).
- Gold, Herbert (1962). The Age of Happy Problems (essays).
- Gold, Herbert (1971). The Magic Will: Stories & Essays. Transaction Publishers. ISBN 9781412837699.
- A Walk on the West Side: California on the Brink, Arbor House, 1981. Stories and essays.
- Stories of Misbegotten Love, with Don Asher (Capra Press, 1985)
- Lovers & Cohorts: Twenty-Seven Stories (Donald I. Fine, 1986)
