= The Rambling Boys =

Studio album by Ramblin' Jack Elliott and Derroll Adams
- Released: 1958
- Recorded: Milan, Italy and London, England
- Genre: Folk
- Length: 34:11 (reissue)
- Label: Topic

Ramblin' Jack Elliott chronology
| Jack Elliot Sings (1957) | The Rambling Boys (1958) | Jack Takes the Floor (1958) |

Alternative Cover

The Rambling Boys is an album by American folk musicians Ramblin' Jack Elliott and Derroll Adams, released in 1958 in England.

== Background ==
Elliott had been performing in England with some success. He and his wife June invited Adams to join them and paid for his crossing from America. They began playing in pubs, coffeehouses, clubs and on the streets, gaining a significant following. During 1957, Elliott and Adams were enjoying a successful run as a duo at the Blue Angel club in Mayfair, West London. They had taken their name from the Carter Family song "Rake and Rambling Boy".

The Rambling Boys was originally issued as a 10-inch record with 10 songs. It was released concurrently with Elliott's album Jack Takes the Floor. The track order was changed and additional tracks were added for the 1963 LP reissue.

== Reception ==
Professional ratings
Review scores
| Source | Rating |
|---|---|
| AllMusic | 3.5/5 stars |

Melody Maker and Sing Out! both praised the original release, the Melody Maker review stating, "That Guthrie-type guitar and Adam's [sic] incredible banjo must have been the most exciting thing to hit the British folk music in recent years." Sing Out! called it "one of the great records of American city singing."

Writing for AllMusic, music critic Steve Leggett called the reissue a "charming little album" and wrote the Vivid label reissue "is the way to go if you can find it, since it reproduces the original 10" cover art and the sound has been tweaked a bit for clarity."

== Reissues ==
- The Rambling Boys was reissued on LP in 1963 by Topic with two additional tracks and re-titled Roll on Buddy
- The Rambling Boys was reissued on CD in 2002 on the Japanese Vivid label.

== Track listing ==
1. "Rich and Rambling Boys" (A. P. Carter)
2. "Buffalo Skinners" (Traditional)
3. "Wish I Was a Rock"
4. "State of Arkansas"
5. "Mother's Not Dead"
6. "East Virginia Blues" (Carter)
7. "The Old Bachelor" – 2:28
8. "Danville Girl" (Traditional)
9. "The Death of Mr. Garfield" (Traditional)
10. "Roll on Buddy" (Traditional)

== 2002 Reissue track listing ==
1. "Rich and Rambling Boys" (A. P. Carter) – 2:48
2. "Buffalo Skinners" (Traditional) – 4:38
3. "I Wish I Was a Rock" – 1:10
4. "It's Hard, Ain't It Hard" (Woody Guthrie) – 3:24
5. "All Around the Water Tank" (Jimmie Rodgers) – 2:00
6. "Mother's Not Dead" – 2:05
7. "East Virginia Blues" (Carter) – 2:41
8. "The Old Bachelor" – 2:28
9. "Danville Girl" (Traditional) – 2:54
10. "The State of Arkansas" – 3:28
11. "The Death of Mr. Garfield" (Traditional) – 4:34
12. "Roll on Buddy" (Traditional) – 2:01

== Personnel ==
The Rambling Boys

- Ramblin' Jack Elliott – vocals, guitar
- Derroll Adams – vocals, banjo

Technical

- Bill Leader – engineer
- Gloria Leader - design
