= Kerouac's Last Dream =

Studio album by Ramblin' Jack Elliott
- Released: 1981
- Recorded: April 24–25, 1980
- Studio: Tonstudio, St. Blasien, Northeim, West Germany
- Genre: Folk
- Length: 70:07
- Label: Folk Freak
- Producer: Carsten Linde (Barbara Dodge)

Ramblin' Jack Elliott chronology
The Essential Ramblin' Jack Elliott (1976)	Kerouac's Last Dream (1981)	South Coast (1995)

Alternative Cover
- Cover of the 1997 reissue of the LP

Kerouac's Last Dream is an album by American folk musician Ramblin' Jack Elliott, released in 1981.

In his liner notes, Elliott writes "I have been asked, sometimes, why I don't learn new songs. These are old ones and I have sung them for a long time. They are good and I think they shall always be good."

Kerouac's Last Dream was reissued on CD in 1997 on the Appleseed label with additional material from the same 1980 sessions for a German LP release.

== Reception ==
Professional ratings
Review scores
Source	Rating
AllMusic	3/5 stars

Music critic William Ruhlman, writing for AllMusic, stated: "Ramblin' Jack Elliott is not primarily a recording artist, he's a folksinger, and these are the songs he sings."

Michael Perryl of No Depression wrote: "The bare-bones best of Kerouac’s Last Dream? All those stories. We may have little in common with buffalo skinners, massacred miners, cowboys, and World War I foot soldiers, or even the folkies and beats of “912 Greens”, but when Ramblin’ Jack sings their stories, I am refreshed to find some universal resonance with travelers who have started our stories for us, rather than hearing one more time that we’re all jes’ good ol’ boys and girls livin’ fer Friday night. Kerouac's Last Dream is a simple, solid collection...unadorned and necessary, y’might even say."

== Track listing ==
=== Original track listing ===
1. "Buffalo Skinners" (Traditional)
2. "Pretty Boy Floyd" (Woody Guthrie)
3. "Cup of Coffee" (Jack Elliott)
4. "Roving Gambler" (Traditional)
5. "Blue Eyes Crying in the Rain" (Fred Rose)
6. "The Cuckoo" (Traditional)
7. "Talkin' Fishin'" (Guthrie)
8. "1913 Massacre" (Guthrie)
9. "Carpenter"
10. "912 Greens" (Elliott)

=== Reissue track listing ===
1. "Pretty Boy Floyd" (Woody Guthrie) – 4:00
2. "Blue Eyes Crying in the Rain" (Fred Rose) – 3:11
3. "Freight Train Blues" (Traditional) – 3:43
4. "Talkin' Fishin'" (Guthrie) – 3:36
5. "Roving Gambler" (Traditional) – 3:50
6. "The Cuckoo" (Traditional) – 3:40
7. "Don't Think Twice, It's All Right" (Bob Dylan) – 3:40
8. "Soldier's Last Letter" (Ernest Tubb, Redd Stewart) – 3:04
9. "1913 Massacre" (Guthrie) – 5:04
10. "Buffalo Skinners" (Traditional) – 5:15
11. "Night Herding Song" (Traditional 2:51
12. "Mean Mama Blues" (Mitchell & Mulligan) – 2:25
13. "I Threw It All Away" (Dylan) – 3:42
14. "Detour" (Paul Westmoreland) – 2:13
15. "Ridin' Down the Canyon" (Gene Autry, Smiley Burnette) – 5:33
16. "Cup of Coffee" (Jack Elliott) – 4:10
17. "912 Greens" (Elliott) – 10:10

== Personnel ==
- Ramblin' Jack Elliott – vocals, guitar

Technical

- Günter Pauler - engineer
- Jerken Diederich - cover design
- Harmut Rosen - cover photography
