= Jack Takes the Floor =

Studio album by Ramblin' Jack Elliott
- Released: June 15, 1958
- Genre: Folk
- Label: Topic
- Producer: Bill Leader, Dick Swettenham

Ramblin' Jack Elliott chronology
The Rambling Boys (1957)	Jack Takes the Floor (1958)	Ramblin' Jack Elliott in London (1959)

Jack Takes the Floor is an album by American folk musician Ramblin' Jack Elliott, released in Great Britain in 1958. The original release was a 10-inch LP.

The album was reissued with two additional songs: "Old Blue" and "East Texas Talking Blues" as Muleskinner. A later reissue further added "Brother Won't You Join the Line?" and "There Are Better Things to Do".

== Track listing ==
Side one

1. "San Francisco Bay Blues" (Jesse Fuller)
2. "Ol' Riley"
3. "Boll Weevil" (Traditional)
4. "Bed Bug Blues"
5. "New York Town"
6. "Grey Goose"

Side two

7. "Mule Skinner Blues" (Jimmie Rodgers, Vaughn Horton)
8. "Cocaine"
9. "Dink's Song"
10. "Black Baby"
11. "Salty Dog" (Traditional)

== Personnel ==
- Ramblin' Jack Elliott – vocals, guitar

== Critical reception ==
It was included in the 2005 book 1001 Albums You Must Hear Before You Die.
