= Adventures of Power =

2008 film by Ari Gold

Adventures of power
- Directed by: Ari Gold
- Written by: Ari Gold
- Produced by: Andrea Sperling
- Starring: Ari Gold; Michael McKean; Jane Lynch; Shoshannah Stern; Chiu Chi Ling; Adrian Grenier
- Cinematography: Lisa Wiegand
- Edited by: Geraud Brisson
- Music by: Ethan Gold
- Production companies: Grack Films; SpaceTime Films; The Group Entertainment
- Distributed by: Variance Films; Phase 4 Films
- Release dates: January 8, 2008 (Sundance); October 9, 2009 (United States)
- Running time: 89 minutes
- Language: English
- Budget: $2.5 million

Adventures of Power is a 2008 American adventure comedy film written and directed by Ari Gold, starring Gold, Michael McKean, Jane Lynch, Shoshannah Stern, Chiu Chi Ling, and Adrian Grenier. It also features Steven Williams, Jimmy Jean-Louis, Annie Golden, and Nick Kroll, with a cameo performance by Rush drummer Neil Peart.

The soundtrack includes original songs by Ethan Gold and hits by Rush, Mr. Mister, Judas Priest, Phil Collins, Dazz Band, Loverboy, Bow Wow Wow, and Woody Guthrie.

The film premiered at the 2008 Sundance Film Festival and made its European debut at the 2008 Karlovy Vary International Film Festival. It was released theatrically in 2009 by Variance Films and on DVD/VOD by Phase 4 Films.

== Plot ==
Power is a mine worker whose love of drums and lack of musical skill has turned him into the ridiculed air drummer of his small town. But when a strike is called at the mine, Power discovers an underground subculture of air drummers who just might hold the key to changing the world. Power's journey across America brings him face-to-face with his town's greatest enemy and allows him to discover the beat within his own heart.

== Cast ==
- Ari Gold as Power
- Michael McKean as Harlan
- Jane Lynch as Joni
- Shoshannah Stern as Annie
- Chiu Chi Ling as Michael Fong
- Adrian Grenier as Dallas Houston
- Eric Wareheim as Money

== Awards ==
- Official Selection, Sundance Film Festival
- Official Selection, Karlovy-Vary International Film Festival
- Audience Award, Best Feature, Vail Film Festival
- Audience Award, Narrative Feature, Memphis Indie Film Festival
- Grand Jury Prize, San Antonio Film Festival
- Jury Prize, Best Feature, Fort Collins TriMedia Festival
- Best Comedy, Philadelphia Independent Film Festival

== Reception ==
Adventures of Power has received mixed reviews. As of June 2024, the film holds a 32% approval rating on Rotten Tomatoes, based on 19 reviews with an average rating of 3.7/10. On Metacritic, it has a score of 39 out of 100 based on reviews from nine critics, indicating "generally unfavorable" reviews.

== Home media ==
Adventures of Power was released on DVD in the United States on January 25, 2010, by Phase 4 Films. The DVD extras include an exclusive interview and drum-off with Rush drummer Neil Peart, a music video starring Adrian Grenier as Dallas H., deleted scenes featuring Jane Lynch, and short films by Ari Gold.

== Soundtrack ==
The film features original songs by Ethan Gold and hits by Rush ("Tom Sawyer"), Mr. Mister ("Kyrie"), Judas Priest ("Hell Bent For Leather"), Phil Collins ("In The Air Tonight"), Dazz Band ("Let It Whip"), Loverboy ("Turn Me Loose"), Bow Wow Wow ("C·30 C·60 C·90 Go!"), Heart ("Dreamboat Annie"), Ramblin' Jack Elliot ("Pastures of Plenty"), War Party ("This Land Was Ours"), and Woody Guthrie.

The original motion picture soundtrack was released by Gold Records on December 25, 2010. The soundtrack includes the Adventures of Power story, 36 digital postcards that describe the making of the film.

=== Track listing ===
1. "The Beat of Our Mama's Heart"
2. "New Jersey Nights"
3. "Impossible Fantasy"
4. "No Drums"
5. "A Little Like You"
6. "Rainwalk"
7. "Dream Drum Solo"
8. "Crib Hip Hop Mashup"
9. "Trains"
10. "Cerealismo"
11. "Bring the Hammer Down / Blanda y Mojada"
12. "Hospital Lullaby"
13. "Tabla Conga Kit Workout"
14. "No Hands"
15. "Nahnu Wahad"
16. "Impossible Love"
17. "The Kiss"
18. "The People Want Peas"
19. "The Call"
20. "Lovin' Tonight"
21. "We Can't Beat Them"
22. "We Got a Job to Do"
23. "The Docks"
24. "The Drums of Bakir"
25. "I Can Feel You"
26. "The Dance Floor"
27. "Ecscape, Supposably"
28. "Showtunes"
29. "The Armpit of the Nation"
30. "Union Local 832"
31. "Memory"
32. "Bugle Call / Impossible Rainwalk"
33. "Who I Really Am"
34. "A Golden Sound"
35. "Grunge"
36. "Cap Medley"
37. "Possible Fantasy"
38. "New Jersey Nights / Tabla Breakdown"
39. "Impossible Fantasy Ballad"
40. "We Are Power"
