= Jack Elliott at the Second Fret =

Live album by Ramblin' Jack Elliott
- Released: 1962 [*Discogs shows released 1963]
- Recorded: May 18, 1962
- Venue: The Second Fret, Philadelphia, PA
- Genre: Folk
- Label: Prestige/International
- Producer: Esmond Edwards, Shel Kagen

Ramblin' Jack Elliott chronology
Ramblin' Jack Elliott (1961)	Jack Elliott at the Second Fret (1962)	Country Style (1962)

Jack Elliott at the Second Fret is a live album by American folk musician Ramblin' Jack Elliott, released in 1962. [*Discogs shows released 1963]

== Reception ==
Professional ratings
Review scores
Source	Rating
Allmusic	3/5 stars

Writing for Allmusic, music critic Richie Unterberger wrote the album "It's perhaps a little more fun to hear than the average early 1960s Jack Elliott album, because the live ambience and spoken introductions and asides give it a warmer atmosphere than the earnest but plain studio recordings."

== Reissues ==
- Jack Elliott at the Second Fret was reissued as Hootenanny with Jack Elliott in 1964 on the Prestige/Folklore label.
- Jack Elliott at the Second Fret was reissued on CD by Fantasy Records in 1999 along with Country Style.

== Track listing ==
=== Side one ===
1. "Mule Skinner Blues" (Jimmie Rodgers, Vaughn Horton)
2. "Cool Water" (Bob Nolan)
3. "Talking Miner" (Woody Guthrie)
4. "Boll Weevil" (Traditional)
5. "How Long Blues"

=== Side two ===
1. "Salty Dog" (Traditional)
2. "Tyin' Knots in the Devil's Tail"
3. "Hobo's Lullaby" (Goebel Reeves)
4. "Talking Sailor" (Woody Guthrie)
5. "Rock Island Line" (Lead Belly)

== Personnel ==
- Ramblin' Jack Elliott – vocals, harmonica, guitar

Technical

- Rudy Van Gelder - mastering
- Don Schlitten - design, photography
