= Songs to Grow On by Woody Guthrie, Sung by Jack Elliott =

Studio album by Ramblin' Jack Elliott
- Released: 1961
- Genre: Folk, children
- Label: Folkways

Ramblin' Jack Elliott chronology
Jack Elliott Sings the Songs of Woody Guthrie (1961)	Songs to Grow On by Woody Guthrie, Sung by Jack Elliott (1961)	Ramblin' Jack Elliott (1961)

Songs to Grow On by Woody Guthrie, Sung by Jack Elliott is an album by American folk musician Ramblin' Jack Elliott, released in 1961. It consists of songs for children written or performed by Woody Guthrie.

== Track listing ==
=== Side one ===
1. "Jig Along Home"
2. "Car Song"
3. "Swimmy Swim"
4. "Don't You Push Me Down"
5. "Why Oh Why"
6. "Put Your Finger in the Air"
7. "Wake Up"
8. "Pretty and Shiny-Oh"

=== Side two ===
1. "Clean-O"
2. "Pick It Up"
3. "Dance Around"
4. "How Dja Do"
5. "My Little Seed"
6. "Build a House"
7. "Needle Song"
8. "We All Work Together"

== Personnel ==
- Ramblin' Jack Elliott – vocals, guitar
