= Ramblin' Jack Elliott in London =

Studio album by Ramblin' Jack Elliott
- Released: 1959
- Recorded: November 5 and 7, 1958
- Genre: Folk
- Label: Columbia
- Producer: Denis Preston

Ramblin' Jack Elliott chronology
Jack Takes the Floor (1958)	Ramblin' Jack Elliott in London (1959)	Ramblin' Jack Elliott Sings Songs by Woody Guthrie and Jimmie Rodgers (1960)

Alternative Cover
- Cover of the first American release of the LP

Professional ratings
Review scores
Source	Rating
Record Mirror	3/5 stars

Ramblin' Jack Elliott in London is an album by American folk musician Ramblin' Jack Elliott, released in 1959 in Great Britain and in 1962 in the US. on the Monitor label

Ramblin' Jack Elliot in London has the distinction of having legendary British producer Joe Meek as balance engineer.

== Reissues ==
- Ramblin' Jack Elliott in London was reissued in 1962 in the US on the Monitor label re-titled as Monitor Presents Jack Elliott: Ramblin' Cowboy.
- Ramblin' Jack Elliott in London was reissued in 1971 on the Marble Arch label as Ramblin' Jack Elliott.
- Ramblin' Jack Elliott in London was reissued on CD in 1994 by Monitor along with Ramblin' Jack Elliott Sings Songs by Woody Guthrie and Jimmie Rodgers as Ramblin' Jack Elliott Sings Woody Guthrie and Jimmie Rodgers.
- Ramblin' Jack Elliott in London was reissued on CD in 2005 by Monitor with Ramblin' Jack Elliott Sings Songs by Woody Guthrie and Jimmie Rodgers and additional tracks and re-titled Ramblin' Jack Elliott Sings Woody Guthrie and Jimmie Rodgers & Cowboy Songs.

== Track listing ==
=== Side one ===
1. "Rusty Jiggs and Sandy Sam"
2. "Git Along Little Doggies" (Traditional)
3. "Sadie Brown" (Jack Elliott)
4. "Night Herding Song" (Traditional)
5. "Chisolm Trail" (Traditional)
6. "Fifteen Cents and a Dollar"

=== Side two ===
1. "Rocky Mountain Belle" (Traditional)
2. "Talking Blues"
3. "Diamond Joe" (Traditional)
4. "In the Willow Garden"
5. "I Ride an Old Paint" (Traditional)
6. "Jack O' Diamonds"

== Personnel ==
- Ramblin' Jack Elliott – vocals, guitar
