= Greg & Steve =

American musical duo

- Origin: Los Angeles, California, U.S.
- Genres: Children's music, folk, pop
- Instruments: Vocals, guitar, keyboard
- Years active: 1975-present
- Labels: Youngheart Records, Creative Teaching Press
- Members: Greg Scelsa; Steve Millang
- Website: gregandsteve.com

Greg & Steve are a musical duo based in Los Angeles, California. The duo, composed of Greg Scelsa (born October 29, 1947) and Steve Millang (born May 10, 1947), has been performing and recording children's music since 1975. Scelsa and Millang both perform as vocalists and guitarists. They have recorded 23 albums, a music video compilation, and a live concert DVD. Greg & Steve are marketed toward children from preschool age through primary school and have sold more than 10 million albums, making them the best-selling children's music duo in the United States. They also have a rigorous concert schedule, playing an average of 100 shows per year. They have even performed at venues such as Carnegie Hall.

Scelsa and Millang, who have known each other since high school, moved from their hometown of Newport Beach, California to Los Angeles to "be closer to the music business" in 1968. They took jobs as special education assistants, and soon started performing music for the children, many of whom had emotional or behavioral problems. Scelsa and Millang found that their music had a positive effect on children with disorders such as autism. For the next several years, they performed their music program for different schools. In 1975, Scelsa and Millang decided to form a record company, Youngheart Records, and presented a recording of their music to National Association for the Education of Young Children convention attendees. After receiving a positive reaction at the conference, Scelsa and Millang formed "Greg & Steve" and began selling their recordings in the educational market.

In 1991, Scelsa and Millang sold the majority interest of Youngheart Records to Creative Teaching Press and have expanded into internet and retail sales. The expansion allowed them to begin selling their music in larger markets such as retailers Barnes & Noble, and allowed them to focus on their music rather than on business tasks. As of 2002, Greg & Steve have received nine Parents' Choice Awards. In 2010, their album Jumpin' and Jammin was nominated for a Grammy Award for Best Musical Album for Children.

== Discography ==
- 1975: We All Live Together, Vol. 1
- 1978: We All Live Together, Vol. 2
- 1979: We All Live Together, Vol. 3
- 1980: We All Live Together, Vol. 4
- 1983: On the Move
- 1983: Quiet Moments
- 1985: Kidding Around
- 1987: Kids in Motion
- 1989: Holidays & Special Times
- 1991: Playing Favorites
- 1991: Greg & Steve Live! in Concert
- 1993: Greg and Steve Musical Adventures (music video compilation)
- 1994: We All Live Together, Vol. 5
- 1995: Rockin' Down the Road
- 1997: Big Fun (which won a Children's Music Web Award in 1998)
- 2000: Kids in Action
- 2002: Fun & Games
- 2004: Ready Set Move
- 2006: Shake, Rattle & Rock
- 2006: Greg & Steve: Live in Concert for Children DVD
- 2007: Sing and Read with Greg & Steve
- 2009: Jumpin' and Jammin'
- 2010: Bounce & Boogie (2013 Creative Child Award Winner)
- 2021: Get Up & Dance

=== We All Live Together, Vol. 1 track listing ===
All tracks are written by Greg Scelsa, except where noted.

No.	Title	Writer(s)	Length
1.	"We All Live Together"		2:27
2.	"ABC Rock"		1:55
3.	"Little Sir Echo (1)"	Laura R. Smith, J.S. Frears	1:25
4.	"Little Sir Echo (2)"	Laura R. Smith, J.S. Frears	1:26
5.	"Friendship March"		2:08
6.	"Loop 'd Loo"	Traditional	3:05
7.	"Good-Bye"		2:16
8.	"Round in a Circle"		2:55
9.	"Wiggle Wobble"	Greg Scelsa, Steve Millang	4:00
10.	"Rock-A-Motion Choo Choo"		3:22
11.	"Skip to My Loo (1)"	Traditional	2:22
12.	"Skip to My Loo (2)"	Traditional	2:23
13.	"Quiet Time"		2:23
Total length:			32:07

=== We All Live Together, Vol. 2 track listing ===
All tracks are written by Greg Scelsa, except where noted.

No.	Title	Writer(s)	Length
1.	"Good Morning"	Bill Fletcher	1:58
2.	"The Number Rock"		1:50
3.	"The Months of the Year (English)"		1:20
4.	"The Months of the Year (Spanish)"		1:19
5.	"The Muffin Man"	Traditional	1:43
6.	"Listen and Move"		4:55
7.	"The World Is a Rainbow"		3:20
8.	"Popcorn"		3:17
9.	"The Boogie Walk"		2:25
10.	"The Freeze"		2:16
11.	"She'll Be Coming 'Round the Mountain (1)"	Traditional	2:11
12.	"She'll Be Coming 'Round the Mountain (2)"	Traditional	1:51
13.	"Resting"		2:34
Total length:			30:59

=== We All Live Together, Vol. 3 track listing ===
All tracks are written by Greg Scelsa, except where noted.

Side one
No.	Title	Writer(s)	Length
1.	"Sing a Happy Song"		2:43
2.	"One, Two, Buckle My Shoe"	Traditional	0:36
3.	"Piggy Bank"		1:50
4.	"Shapes"		2:22
5.	"If You're Happy and You Know It"	Traditional	1:58
6.	"Simon Says (#1, Body Parts)"		2:47
7.	"Simon Says (#2)"		2:47
Total length:			15:03

Side two
No.	Title	Writer(s)	Length
8.	"Disco Limbo"		3:48
9.	"Dancin' Machine"		3:55
10.	"Rock 'Round the Mulberry Bush (#1 Hygiene)"	Traditional	3:24
11.	"Rock 'Round the Mulberry Bush (#2)"	Traditional	3:30
12.	"Nocturne"	Frederic Chopin	2:42
Total length:			17:19 32:22

=== We All Live Together, Vol. 4 track listing ===
All tracks are written by Greg Scelsa, except where noted.

Side one
No.	Title	Writer(s)	Length
1.	"It's A Beautiful Day"		2:00
2.	"Hand Jive"		3:03
3.	"The Days of the Week (English)"	Christopher Moroney, Covita Moroney	1:06
4.	"The Days of the Week (Spanish)"	Christopher Moroney, Covita Moroney	1:06
5.	"What If (Creative Dramatics)"		6:06
6.	"The Ugly Duckling"	Frank Loesser	3:06
7.	"Bingo"	Traditional	1:50
8.	"Everybody Has Music Inside"	Greg Scelsa, David Kirschner	3:01
Total length:			21:18

Side two
No.	Title	Writer(s)	Length
9.	"Just Like Me (Mirror Movement)"		2:12
10.	"Ballin' the Jack"	Jim Burris, Chris Smith	2:28
11.	"Dance Medley"	Greg Scelsa, Henry Mancini, Brian Wilson, Mike Love	5:22
12.	"Across the Bridge (#1 Balance Beam)"		3:56
13.	"Across the Bridge (#2)"		3:04
14.	"Siesta"		4:25
Total length:			21:27 42:45

=== On the Move track listing ===
Side one
No.	Title	Writer(s)	Length
1.	"Rock to the Music"		1:57
2.	"Scat Like That"		3:23
3.	"How Many Days?"		1:07
4.	"An Adventure in Space"	Corky Green	7:47
5.	"Friends"		3:25
Total length:			17:39

Side two
No.	Title	Writer(s)	Length
6.	"Warmin' Up (1)"		3:48
7.	"Warmin' Up (2)"		3:46
8.	"Sports Dance"	Greg Scelsa, Steve Millang	2:51
9.	"On the Move"		4:34
10.	"Shoo Fly (1)"	Greg Scelsa, Steve Millang	3:12
11.	"Shoo Fly (2)"	Greg Scelsa, Steve Millang	3:10
Total length:			21:21 39:00

=== Quiet Moments track listing ===
All tracks are written by Greg Scelsa, except where noted.

Side one
No.	Title	Writer(s)	Originally Taken From	Length
1.	"Winding Down"	Greg Scelsa, Steve Millang, Robin Baltic, Sharman Davis Jamison	Siesta appears on We All Live Together, Vol. 4 (1980). Resting appears on We All Live Together, Vol. 2 (1978). Tradewinds appears on this album (1983)	11:04
2.	"Daydreams"	Tom Baker		3:55
3.	"Quiet Time"		We All Live Together, Vol. 1 (1975)	2:27
Total length:				17:26

Side two
No.	Title	Writer(s)	Originally Taken From	Length
4.	"Tradewinds"			5:04
5.	"Lotus Flower"			3:31
6.	"Morning Mist"	Christopher Moroney		4:10
7.	"Siesta"		We All Live Together, Vol. 4 (1980)	4:27
8.	"Skyward"	Tom Baker		2:41
Total length:				19:53 37:19

=== Kidding Around track listing ===
All tracks are written by Greg Scelsa, except where noted.

Side one
No.	Title	Writer(s)	Length
1.	"Say Hello"	Christopher Moroney	1:47
2.	"Copy Cat (1)"	Greg Scelsa, Christopher Moroney & Covita Moroney	2:33
3.	"Copy Cat (2)"	Greg Scelsa, Christopher Moroney & Covita Moroney	1:47
4.	"The Hugging Song"		1:42
5.	"Safety Break"		3:07
6.	"Believe In Yourself"		2:37
Total length:			13:33

Side two
No.	Title	Writer(s)	Length
7.	"The Body Rock"		2:35
8.	"Hokey Pokey (1)"	Traditional	2:32
9.	"Hokey Pokey (2)"	Traditional	2:32
10.	"Jimmy Crack Corn"	Traditional	3:03
11.	"Rhyme Time (1)"		3:22
12.	"Rhyme Time (2)"		3:21
Total length:			17:25 30:58

=== Holidays & Special Times track listing ===
All tracks are written by Greg Scelsa, except where noted.

Side one
No.	Title	Writer(s)	Originally Sung By	Length
1.	"If You Feel Like Rockin'"	Greg Scelsa, Steve Millang		2:00
2.	"Halloween on Parade"			3:58
3.	"The Party Line"	Greg Scelsa, Steve Millang		3:34
4.	"Jingle Bell Rock"	Joe Beal, Jim Boothe	Bobby Helms	2:26
5.	"Music Makes the World Go 'Round"			3:39
6.	"Somebody's Birthday"			1:20
Total length:				16:57

Side two
No.	Title	Writer(s)	{{{extra_column}}}	Length
7.	"This Land Is Your Land"	Woody Guthrie	Woody Guthrie	2:47
8.	"Peter Cottontail"	Steve Nelson, Jack Rollins	Gene Autry	2:08
9.	"Love Is"			3:49
10.	"A Man Named King"	Greg Scelsa, Traditional, Martin Luther King Jr.		3:37
11.	"Happy Thanksgiving to All"	Steve Millang		2:47
12.	"Goodbye and Farewell"			2:08
Total length:				17:16 34:13

=== Playing Favorites track listing ===
Side one
No.	Title	Writer(s)	{{{extra_column}}}	Length
1.	"Zip-a-Dee-Doo-Dah"	Allie Wrubel, Ray Gilbert	Song of the South (1946)	2:04
2.	"I've Been Working on the Railroad"	Traditional		2:52
3.	"Join in the Game"	Traditional		2:43
4.	"The Three Little Pigs Blues"	Greg Scelsa, Michael Lewis		3:19
5.	"Down by the Bay"	Traditional		2:36
6.	"We've Got the Whole World"	Greg Scelsa, Traditional		3:00
Total length:				16:34

Side two
No.	Title	Writer(s)	Length
7.	"This Old Man"	Traditional	3:01
8.	"Ain't Gonna Rain No More/Rain Rain Go Away"	Traditional	2:34
9.	"Heavenly Music"	Saul Chaplin	1:57
10.	"Did You Ever See a Lassie?/The More We Get Together"	Traditional	1:26
11.	"Put Your Finger in the Air"	Woody Guthrie	2:40
12.	"Brown Bear, Brown Bear, What Do You See?"	Bill Martin Jr., Eric Carle, Greg Scelsa	3:12
Total length:			14:50 31:24

=== We All Live Together, Vol 5. track listing ===
All tracks are written by Greg Scelsa, except where noted.

Side one
No.	Title	Writer(s)	{{{extra_column}}}	Length
1.	"We're All Together Again"	Traditional, Greg Scelsa	We All Live Together appears on We All Live Together, Vol. 1 (1975)	1:36
2.	"The Number Game"	Greg Scelsa, Bill Fletcher		1:44
3.	"I Like Potatoes"			3:13
4.	"A Walking We Will Go"	Thomas Arne, Greg Scelsa		3:03
5.	"Old Brass Wagon"	Traditional		2:17
6.	"Rainbow of Colors"			3:20
7.	"Friends Forever"	Greg Scelsa, John Debney		3:29
Total length:				18:42

Side two
No.	Title	Writer(s)	Length
8.	"Get Up and Go"	Greg Scelsa, James Brown	3:47
9.	"Rock 'n' Roll Rhythm Band"		3:33
10.	"Let's Go to the Market"	Frank Leto, Greg Scelsa	2:54
11.	"Down on the Farm"	Greg Scelsa, Traditional	2:14
12.	"Desert Nights"	Steve Millang	4:13
Total length:			16:41 35:23

=== Rockin' Down the Road track listing ===
All tracks are written by Greg Scelsa, except where noted.

Side one
No.	Title	Writer(s)	{{{extra_column}}}	Length
1.	"Rockin' the U.S.A."			3:54
2.	"Sunshine Medley: You Are My Sunshine/This Little Light of Mine"	Jimmie Davis, Charles Mitchell, Traditional		2:45
3.	"Yellow Submarine"	John Lennon, Paul McCartney	Revolver (1966)	3:00
4.	"Three Billy Goats Gruff"	Greg Scelsa, Mike Lewis		4:30
5.	"Riding in My Car"	Woody Guthrie		3:04
6.	"Snowflake"			3:19
Total length:				20:32

Side two
No.	Title	Writer(s)	{{{extra_column}}}	Length
7.	"Can't Sit Still"			3:15
8.	"This Land Is Your Land"	Woody Guthrie	Holidays & Special Times (1989)	2:46
9.	"Dancin' Machine"		We All Live Together, Vol. 3 (1979)	2:56
10.	"Long Tall Texan"	Henry Strzelecki		2:38
11.	"And the Green Grass Grew All Around"	Traditional		2:18
12.	"Home on the Range"	Daniel E. Kelley, Brewster M. Highley		2:35
Total length:				16:28 37:00
