= Jack Elliott Sings the Songs of Woody Guthrie =

Studio album by Ramblin' Jack Elliott
- Released: September 1960
- Genre: Folk
- Label: Prestige/EMI International
- Producer: Kenneth S. Goldstein

Ramblin' Jack Elliott chronology
Ramblin' Jack Elliott Sings Songs by Woody Guthrie and Jimmie Rodgers (1960)	Jack Elliott Sings the Songs of Woody Guthrie (1960)	Songs to Grow On by Woody Guthrie, Sung by Jack Elliott (1961)

Jack Elliott Sings the Songs of Woody Guthrie is an album by American folk musician Ramblin' Jack Elliott, released in September 1960. It consists of songs written or well known as performed by Woody Guthrie.

== Reception ==
Professional ratings
Review scores
Source	Rating
Allmusic	4/5 stars
Record Mirror	3/5 stars

Writing for Allmusic, music critic Richie Unterberger called the album "the recording that is most representative of his role in popularizing the work of his hero."

== Reissues ==
- Jack Elliott Sings the Songs of Woody Guthrie was reissued along with Ramblin' Jack Elliott in 1989 as a double LP on the Fantasy label as Hard Travelin'. It was reissued on CD in 1991 with "I Love Her So/I Got a Woman" omitted.

== Track listing ==
=== Side one ===
1. "Hard Traveling"
2. "Grand Coulee Dam"
3. "New York Town"
4. "Tom Joad"
5. "Howdido"
6. "Talking Dust Bowl"
7. "This Land is Your Land"

=== Side two ===
1. "Pretty Boy Floyd"
2. "Philadelphia Lawyer"
3. "Talking Columbia"
4. "Dust Storm Disaster"
5. "Riding in My Car"
6. "1913 Massacre"
7. "So Long"

== Personnel ==
- Ramblin' Jack Elliott – vocals, harmonica, guitar
- Rudy Van Gelder - recording and mastering
