= Friends of Mine (Ramblin' Jack Elliott album) =

Studio album by Ramblin' Jack Elliott
- Released: March 17, 1998
- Genre: Folk, country blues
- Length: 48:20
- Label: High Tone
- Producer: Roy Rogers

Ramblin' Jack Elliott chronology
South Coast (1995)	Friends of Mine (1998)	The Long Ride (1999)

Friends of Mine is an album by American folk musician Ramblin' Jack Elliott, released in 1998.

Guests include Nanci Griffith, Emmylou Harris, Arlo Guthrie, Jerry Jeff Walker, John Prine, and Tom Waits.

== Reception ==
Professional ratings
Review scores
Source	Rating
Allmusic	3/5 stars

Writing for Allmusic, music critic Thom Owens wrote the album "is a thoroughly enjoyable collection of duets (and one trio) produced by Roy Rogers. There's a loose, intimate atmosphere on Friends of Mine that is instantly appealing, and his selection of singing partners... It's an excellent latter-day effort from Elliott that confirms his status as a legendary folksinger."

== Track listing ==
1. "Ridin' Down the Canyon" (duet with Arlo Guthrie) (Gene Autry, Smiley Burnette) – 4:24
2. "Me and Billy the Kid" (duet with Peter Rowan) (Joe Ely) – 3:50
3. "Last Letter" (duet with Rosalie Sorrels)(Rex Griffin) – 5:06
4. "Louise" (duet with Tom Waits)(Tom Waits, Kathleen Brennan) – 4:44
5. "Rex's Blues" (with Nanci Griffith and Emmylou Harris) (Townes Van Zandt) – 2:36
6. "Walls of Red Wing" (duet with John Prine) (Bob Dylan) – 4:31
7. "Hard Travelin'" (duet with Jerry Jeff Walker)(Woody Guthrie) – 2:46
8. "He Was a Friend of Mine" (duet with Jerry Jeff Walker)(traditional) – 3:25
9. "Dark as a Dungeon" (duet with Guy Clark) (Merle Travis) – 4:43
10. "Friend of the Devil" (duet with Bob Weir) (Jerry Garcia, Robert Hunter, John Dawson) – 4:14
11. "Reason to Believe" (Tim Hardin) – 3:25
12. "Bleeker Street Blues" (Jack Elliott) – 3:51
13. "Old Time Feeling" (with Tom Waits and Guy Clark) (Guy Clark) - 0:45

== Personnel ==
- Ramblin' Jack Elliott – vocals, guitar
- Bob Weir – vocals, guitar
- Norton Buffalo – harmonica
- Ruth Davies – bass
- Guy Clark- vocals
- Nanci Griffith – guitar, vocals
- Arlo Guthrie – guitar, vocals
- Emmylou Harris – vocals
- John Prine – guitar, vocals
- Tom Rigney – violin
- Peter Rowan – guitar, mandolin, vocals
- Rosalie Sorrels – vocals
- Tom Waits – vocals, guitar
- Jerry Jeff Walker – vocals, guitar, harmonica
- Billy Wilson – accordion

Production notes:

- Roy Rogers – producer
- Mooka Rennick – engineer
- Robert Geller – assistant engineer
- Scotty Johnson – assistant engineer
- Cindy Pascarello – design
- Gaynell Toler Rogers – photography
- Chris Felver – photography
