= Woody Guthrie's Blues =

Studio album by Ramblin' Jack Elliott
- Released: 1956
- Recorded: October 1955
- Genre: Folk
- Length: 32:52 (reissue)
- Label: Topic

Ramblin' Jack Elliott chronology
Woody Guthrie's Blues (1956)	Jack Elliot Sings (1957)

Woody Guthrie's Blues is an album by American folk musician Ramblin' Jack Elliott, released in 1956 in Great Britain.

== Background ==
Elliott recalled that the album was recorded by Alan Lomax in the living room of Ewan MacColl's mother in England. The album includes Elliott's arrangements of songs recorded by American folk singer Woody Guthrie, Elliott's hero and mentor.

== Reissues ==
Woody Guthrie's Blues was originally issued as an 8-inch LP with 6 songs by Topic. The track order was changed and additional tracks were added for the 1963 LP reissue as Talking Woody Guthrie. It was again reissued on CD on the Vivid label in 2002 using the 1963 title and track listing.

== Track listing ==
All songs by Woody Guthrie.

=== Side one ===
1. "Talking Columbia Blues" – 3:46
2. "Ludlow Massacre" – 3:39
3. "Hard Traveling" – 3:26

=== Side two ===
1. "Talking Dustbowl Blues" – 2:56
2. "1913 Massacre" – 4:10
3. "Talking Sailor Blues" – 4:00

== 1963 Reissue track listing ==
=== Side one ===
1. "Talking Columbia Blues"
2. "Pretty Boy Floyd"
3. "Ludlow Massacre"
4. "Talking Miner Blues"
5. "Hard Travelling"

=== Side two ===
1. "So Long, It's Been Good to Know You"
2. "Talking Dustbowl Blues"
3. "1913 Massacre"
4. "Rambling Blues"
5. "Talking Sailor Blues"
- 2009 Three Score and Ten Topic Records 70 year anniversary boxed set included Talking Dustbowl Blues as track twelve on the seventh CD.

== Personnel ==
- Ramblin' Jack Elliott – vocals, guitar, harmonica
