= Young Brigham =

Studio album by Ramblin' Jack Elliott
- Released: 1968
- Recorded: United Recorders and Gold Star Studios
- Genre: Folk
- Label: Reprise
- Producer: Bruce Langhorne

Ramblin' Jack Elliott chronology
Jack Elliott (1964)	Young Brigham (1968)	Bull Durham Sacks & Railroad Tracks (1970)

Young Brigham is an album by American folk musician Ramblin' Jack Elliott, released in 1968.

== History ==
Young Brigham was Elliott's first major-label release on the Reprise label. The liner notes were written by his friend Johnny Cash.

The subject of "Goodnight Little Arlo" by Woody Guthrie is his son, Arlo Guthrie. "912 Greens" documents Elliott and his friends' search for Billy Faier in New Orleans.

== Reception ==
Professional ratings
Review scores
Source	Rating
Allmusic	3/5 stars
Rolling Stone	Positive

Writing for Allmusic, music critic Ronnie D. Lankford, Jr. wrote the album "The difference between Elliott's versions [of the songs] and those of your average folksinger is that he sounds as though he's having a good time. Young Brigham is a nice snapshot of Elliott in the late ‘60s and shows him leaving the confines of a large studio with his folk heritage intact."

== Reissues ==
- Selections from Young Brigham was reissued on CD with selections from Bull Durham Sacks & Railroad Tracks as Me & Bobby McGee by Rounder Records in 1995.
- Young Brigham was reissued on CD by Collector's Choice Music in 2001.

== Track listing ==
1. "If I Were a Carpenter" (Tim Hardin) – 5:04
2. "Talking Fisherman" (Woody Guthrie) – 4:00
3. "Tennessee Stud" (Jimmy Driftwood) – 4:51
4. "Tractor" (Jack Elliott) – 0:59
5. "Night Herding Song" (Traditional; arranged by Jack Elliott) – 3:56
6. "Rock Island Line" (Traditional; arranged by Jack Elliott) – 5:29
7. "Danville Girl" (Traditional; arranged by Jack Elliott) – 3:32
8. "912 Greens" (Elliott) – 7:23
9. "Don't Think Twice, It's All Right" (Bob Dylan) – 3:51
10. "Connection" (Mick Jagger, Keith Richards) – 2:24
11. "Goodnight Little Arlo" (Woody Guthrie) – 2:57

== Personnel ==
- Ramblin' Jack Elliott – vocals, harmonica, guitar
- Pete Childs – bass, dobro
- Richard Greene – fiddle
- Mitch Greenhill – guitar
- Eric Hord – harmonica, autoharp
- Bruce Langhorne – tabla
- Jack O'Hara – bass
- Bill Lee – organ
- Mark Spoelstra – guitar

Production notes:

- Bruce Langhorne – producer
- Andy Richardson, Doc Siegel, Joe Sidore - engineer
- Andy Wickham - executive producer
- Henry Diltz – photography
- Ed Thrasher - art direction
- Johnny Cash – original liner notes
- Richie Unterberger – reissue liner notes
