= Bull Durham Sacks & Railroad Tracks =

Studio album by Ramblin' Jack Elliott
- Released: 1970
- Studio: Woodland (Nashville, Tennessee); Columbia (Nashville, Tennessee)
- Genre: Folk
- Label: Reprise
- Producer: Charlie Daniels, Neil Wilburn

Ramblin' Jack Elliott chronology
Young Brigham (1968)	Bull Durham Sacks & Railroad Tracks (1970)	The Essential Ramblin' Jack Elliott (1976)

Bull Durham Sacks & Railroad Tracks is an album by American folk musician Ramblin' Jack Elliott, released in 1970. It was his second, and last, release on the Reprise label. Elliott did not release another studio album for eleven years.

== Reception ==
Professional ratings
Review scores
Source	Rating
Allmusic	2/5 stars

Writing for Allmusic, music critic Mary Grady wrote the album "The album shines when it gets away from talking and into the music... Lowlights are the spoken raps, which just don't work well in the context of the album. Overall, the album is a good representation of the most commercial period of Elliott's career."

== Reissues ==
- Bull Durham Sacks & Railroad Tracks was reissued on CD with selections from Young Brigham as Me & Bobby McGee by Rounder Records in 1995.
- Bull Durham Sacks & Railroad Tracks was reissued on CD by Collector's Choice Music in 2001.

== Track listing ==
1. "Me and Bobby McGee" (Kris Kristofferson, Fred Foster) – 3:45
2. "Folsom Prison Blues" (Johnny Cash) – 3:48
3. "Reason to Believe" (Tim Hardin) – 2:02
4. "I'll Be Your Baby Tonight" (Bob Dylan) – 1:51
5. "Don't Let Your Deal Go Down" (Traditional) – 3:57
6. "Don't Think Twice, It's All Right" (Dylan) – 1:05
7. "Lay Lady Lay" (Dylan) – 2:55
8. "Girl from the North Country" (Dylan) – 3:00
9. "The Tramp on the Street" (Grady Cole, Hazel Cole) – 4:27
10. "Michigan Water Blue" (Clarence Williams) – 2:14
11. "Don't You Leave Me Here" (Traditional) – 1:26
12. "Blue Mountain" (Traditional) – 0:44
13. "With God on Our Side" (Dylan) – 3:44

== Personnel ==
- Ramblin' Jack Elliott – vocals, guitar

Production notes:

- Neil Wilburn – producer, engineer
- Charlie Daniels – producer
- Johnny Cash – original liner notes
