= J. Richardson Dilworth =

American financial adviser

Joseph Richardson Dilworth (June 9, 1916 – December 29, 1997) was a leading businessman, best known for being a senior financial adviser for the Rockefeller family. He also served as a director at many other companies and financial institutions including Chrysler Corporation, Macy's, the Squibb Corporation. He was a member of both the American Academy of Arts and Sciences and the American Philosophical Society.

== Early life and career ==
Dilworth was born on June 9, 1916, in Hewlett hamlet in Long Island, New York. His parents were Edith Logan Dilworth and investment banker Dewees Wood Dilworth. His uncle was politician Richardson Dilworth.

He attended the Buckley School in Manhattan and St. Mark's School in Southborough, Massachusetts. Dilworth graduated from Yale University in 1938, where he was a member of Skull and Bones, and the Yale Law school in 1942.

Dilworth served in the United States Navy during World War II. He was a partner of the investment bank Kuhn, Loeb & Co. from 1952 to 1958.

== Rockefeller Financial Advisor ==
Dilworth is best known for being the leading manager of Room 5600, known now as Rockefeller Family & Associates, the family office of the Rockefeller family, situated on the 54-56th floors of the GE Building, 30 Rockefeller Plaza, in Rockefeller Center.

Beginning in 1956, he headed the family office and was the senior financial adviser to the family and its investments and philanthropic institutions for 23 years, retiring in 1981. During this time he also sat on the board of directors of the family-associated Chase Manhattan Bank and was a personal friend of its chairman, David Rockefeller.

In 1974 he came into public prominence when he appeared before the United States Congress during the confirmation hearings for Nelson Rockefeller's nomination by Gerald Ford for the vice-presidency; during his presentation to Congressmen he outlined the overall wealth of Nelson's family.

In his service for the six-generation dynastic clan, Dilworth served up until 1982 as the chair of the company that previously owned Rockefeller Center, Rockefeller Center Inc. (RCI), which is now the Rockefeller Group. He also sat on the boards of many other corporations, some of which were directly associated with the family.

While Dilworth worked for a famed employer - the Rockefellers - he also had at least one notable employee working for him. In 1963 to 1964, will still associated with Dilworth, William Thaddeus Coleman Jr. served as Assistant Counsel to that 36th U.S. President's Commission most commonly referred to as the Warren Commission.

== Death ==
On Monday, December 29, 1997, J. Richardson Dilworth died at the age of 81 at the Princeton Hospital in Princeton, New Jersey, the community where he lived during retirement.

He was survived by his wife, Elizabeth McKay Cushing, and three children. He was preceded in death by his daughter Melissa Dilworth Gold (1944–1991), who was formerly married to novelist Herbert Gold and lawyer Robert L. Anderson. She was in a relationship with promoter Bill Graham at the time of their accidental deaths in 1991. His grandson, Ari Gold, is an independent filmmaker.

== See also ==
- Rockefeller family
- Chase Manhattan Bank
- David Rockefeller
