= Old Blue (song) =

Folk song

"Old Blue" (also known as "Old Dog Blue") is an old folk song, believed to have originated from the minstrel shows of the late 19th century. A 1928 version by Jim Jackson, entitled "Old Dog Blue", appears on the Anthology of American Folk Music album. Since this early recording, a number of covers and variations of this song have been recorded. In his 1985 play, Fences, August Wilson uses Jim Jackson's version as a leitmotif, and the play's central character (who had a dog named Blue as a boy) says his father originated the song.

== Various versions ==
- Joan Baez, Joan Baez, Vol. 2 (1961)
- The Byrds, Dr. Byrds & Mr. Hyde (1969)
- Furry Lewis, Shake 'Em On Down (1961)
- Guy Carawan, Songs with Guy Carawan (1950)
- Ramblin' Jack Elliott, I Stand Alone (2006)
- David Wiffen, David Wiffen At The Bunkhouse Coffeehouse, Vancouver BC (1965)
- Johnny Duncan, Vintage Rock Nº 23 - EPs Collectors "Johnny Duncan's Tennessee Song Bag" (1957)
- Cisco Houston, Songs to Grow On, Vol. 3: This Land Is My Land (1951)
- Bill Staines, One More River (1998)
- Anne Hills, Never Grow Up (1998)
- The Dillards, Live!!!! Almost!!! (1964)
- Bob Gibson and Bob Camp, Bob Gibson and Bob Camp at The Gate of Horn (1961)
- Sam Hinton, Whoever Shall Have Some Good Peanuts (2006)
- Pete Seeger, American Favorite Ballads, Vol. 3 (1957)
- Lonnie Pitchford, The Harry Smith Connection: A Live Tribute To The Anthology Of American Folk Music (1998)
- Dave Van Ronk, Somebody Else, Not Me (1980)
- JJ Cale, Guitar Man (1996)
- Georgia Ruth, Week of Pines (2013)
- Appears on Disney Children's Favorite Songs 2 (1979) by Larry Groce as a children's song.
- Emerson, Lake & Palmer; Greg Lake during live performances of "Take a Pebble" (1970-71)
- Ian & Sylvia
- Charlie Parr, I Ain't Dead Yet (2016)
- Peter, Paul & Mary, In Concert (1964), as "Blue"
- Frankie Laine, Balladeer (1959)
- Shawn Phillips, Shawn (1966)
- Grandpa Jones, Old Blue (1953)
- David Johansen & The Harry Smiths, David Johansen & The Harry Smiths (2000)
