= I Stand Alone (Ramblin' Jack Elliott album) =

Studio album by Ramblin' Jack Elliott
- Released: July 11, 2006
- Genres: Folk, country blues
- Label: ANTI-
- Producer: Ian Brennan

Ramblin' Jack Elliott chronology
The Lost Topic Tapes: Isle of Wight 1957 (2004)	I Stand Alone (2006)	Vanguard Visionaries (2007)

I Stand Alone is an album by American folk musician Ramblin' Jack Elliott, released in 2006.

The album was nominated for Grammy Award for Best Traditional Folk Album in the 49th Annual Grammy Awards.

Guests include Lucinda Williams, David Hidalgo, Nels Cline, Flea, and Corin Tucker.

== Reception ==
Professional ratings
Review scores
Source	Rating
Allmusic	4/5 stars
No Depression	(no rating)

Writing for Allmusic, music critic Thom Jurek wrote the album "Elliott hasn't recorded an album in seven years, but I Stand Alone ranks among his very best efforts. His voice is richer now that it's aged; it's full of authority, wisdom, and a certain kind of madness — the kind that one witnesses during his live shows... It's a fantastic introduction to Elliott for newbies, and authoritative proof that he's not only still got it, but he just keeps getting better."

Robert L. Doerschuk of No Depression wrote "The point is, Elliott does pretty much stand alone. He seems to like it when somebody sings or plays with him, but it’s up to them to tag along as he stretches a few extra beats into a verse... He is, then, Ramblin’ Jack, no more or less — and irreplaceable."

== Track listing ==
1. "Engine 143" – 3:28
2. "Arthritis Blues" – 4:21
3. "Old Blue" – 3:16
4. "Driving Nails in My Coffin" – 1:54
5. "Rake & Ramblin' Boy" – 1:50
6. "Hong Kong Blues" – 2:08
7. "Jean Harlow" – 0:31
8. "Call Me a Dog" – 1:26
9. "Careless Darling" – 1:27
10. "Mr. Garfield" – 3:36
11. "My Old Dog & Me" – 0:19
12. "Leaving Cheyenne " – 1:40
13. "Remember Me" – 1:19
14. "Willy Moore" – 2:06
15. "Honey, Where You Been So Long?" – 1:26
16. "Woody's Last Ride" – 1:38

== Personnel ==
- Ramblin' Jack Elliott – vocals, guitar
- Lucinda Williams – vocals
- David Hidalgo – accordion
- Nels Cline – guitar
- Flea – bass
- D. J. Bonebrake - drums

Production

- Ian Brennan – producer
- Tony Brooke – engineer
- Rocky Grisez – engineer
- Sam M. Lewis – engineer
- Kendra Wright – engineer
