= In Concert (Peter, Paul and Mary album) =

Live album by Peter, Paul & Mary
- Released: 1964
- Genre: Folk
- Length: 81:29 (reissue)
- Label: Warner Bros.
- Producer: Albert Grossman; John Court; Milton Okun (musical director)

Peter, Paul & Mary chronology
In the Wind (1963)	In Concert (1964)	A Song Will Rise (1965)

Professional ratings
Review scores
Source	Rating
Allmusic	4/5 stars

In Concert is a live album by the American folk music trio Peter, Paul & Mary, released in 1964 (see 1964 in music). It was compiled from concerts at San Francisco, Sacramento, Long Beach in California; Daytona Beach, Florida and Terre Haute, Indiana. Supporting the trio, Dick Kniss plays bass. It was digitally re-mixed and re-mastered and released on CD in 1989.

== Track listing ==
1. "The Times They Are a-Changin'" (Bob Dylan) – 3:16
2. "A'soalin'" (Paul Stookey, Tracy Batteste, Elena Mezzetti) – 5:28
3. "500 Miles" (Hedy West) – 3:02
4. "Blue" (Paul Stookey, Peter Yarrow) – 4:01
5. "Three Ravens" (Milton Okun, Paul Stookey, Mary Travers, Peter Yarrow) – 3:54
6. "One Kind Favor" (Blind Lemon Jefferson) – 3:12
7. "Blowin' in the Wind" (Bob Dylan) – 3:36
8. "Car-Car" (Woody Guthrie) – 5:01
9. "Puff, the Magic Dragon" (Peter Yarrow, Leonard Lipton) – 6:18
10. "Jesus Met the Woman" (Milton Okun, Mary Travers, Peter Yarrow) – 4:24
11. "Le Déserteur" (Harold Berg, Boris Vian) – 4:32
12. "Oh, Rock My Soul" (Peter Yarrow) – 5:47
13. "Paultalk" (Paul Stookey) – 12:38
14. "Single Girl" (Paul Stookey, Mary Travers) – 2:31
15. "There Is a Ship" (Milton Okun, Paul Stookey, Mary Travers, Peter Yarrow) – 3:00
16. "It's Raining" (Paul Stookey) – 5:23
17. "If I Had My Way" (Rev. Gary Davis) – 2:51
18. "If I Had a Hammer" (Pete Seeger, Lee Hays) – 2:35

== Personnel ==
- Peter Yarrow – vocals, guitar, recorder
- Noel "Paul" Stookey – vocals, guitar
- Mary Travers – vocals
- Dick Kniss – bass

Technical

- Lowell Frank – engineer
- Barry Feinstein – photography

== Chart positions ==
Year	Chart	Position
1964	Billboard 200	4
