= Down in the Willow Garden =

Murder ballad

"Down in the Willow Garden" (Roud 446), also known as "Rose Connelly", is a traditional Appalachian murder ballad. It is written from the perspective of a man facing the gallows for the murder of his lover, to whom he gave poisoned wine, then stabbed, and threw in a river. It originated in the 19th century, probably in Ireland, before becoming established in the United States. The lyrics greatly vary among earlier versions, but professional recordings have stabilized the song in a cut-down form. First professionally recorded in 1927, it was made popular by Charlie Monroe's 1947 version, and it has been recorded dozens of times since then.

== Origins ==
The song may have derived from Irish sources from the early 19th century. Edward Bunting noted a song by the name "Rose Connolly" in 1811 in Coleraine. A version with slightly different lyrics is known from Galway in 1929. The song has lyrical similarities to W. B. Yeats' 1899 poem "Down by the Salley Gardens", which itself probably derives from the Irish ballad "The Rambling Boys of Pleasure". The first versions of "Rose Connoley" probably derive from the Irish ballads "The Wexford Girl" and "The Rambling Boys of Pleasure", or similar songs. "The Wexford Girl" also gave rise to the Appalachian murder ballad "The Knoxville Girl". Unlike other Irish ballads, "Down in the Willow Garden" was initially restricted to the Appalachian region of the United States; folklorist D. K. Wilgus mused that "it is as if an Irish local song never popularized on broadsides was spread by a single Irish peddler on his travels through Appalachia."

The song is first noted in the United States in 1915, when it was referred to as popular in 1895 in Wetzel County, West Virginia. Folklorist Cecil Sharp came across the song in 1918 in Virginia and North Carolina.

== Lyrics and music ==
The Flatt and Scruggs version of the lyrics, as found on metrolyrics.com, is as follows:

Down in the willow garden
there me and my love did meet
while we set a' courtin'
my love fell off to sleep.

I'd bought a bottle of burgundy wine
but my true love did not know
I planned to poison that dear little girl
there on the banks below.

I drew a sabre through her
it was an awful sight
I threw her in the river
and then ran off in fright.

My father he had told me
that money would set me free
if I would poison that dear little girl
whose name was Rose Connelly.

My father weeps at his cabin door
wipin' his tear dimmed eyes
for soon his only son shall hang
from yonder scaffold high.

My race is run beneath the sun
my sentence is waiting for me
for I did poison that dear little girl
whose name was Rose Connelly.

The lyrics are written from the point of view of the murderer. According to Wigley, the song follows "the 'murdered sweetheart' pattern in which a girl stated or assumed to be pregnant is murdered by her lover, who is usually brought to justice in one manner or another." His motivations might have been to avoid marriage, gain money, or feeling compelled into the crime by his father, but now that he is facing the scaffold he is overcome by the realization that he has killed the girl and caused pain to his family. Murder ballads often feature a stabbing or beating followed by burying the body or disposing of it in a river; this song is unusual in featuring both poisoning and stabbing the victim before she is thrown into the river.

The song is known in many versions: Wilgus noted 71 in 1979. The earliest versions are divided into 10 stanzas, though not all versions include all the stanzas: the now-standardized professional recordings are pared down versions that lack that first "come-all-ye" stanza and the naming of the murderer, leaving stanzas 2, 3, 4, 8, 9, and 10. The most common lyric is the second stanza:

Down in a willow garden
My true love and I did meet
And we were a-sitting discoursing
My true love dropped off to sleep

Most traditional versions name the victim as Rose Connelly, or a similar surname. Many versions have the murderer name himself; the name varies but tends towards the pattern "Patrick McR...". One early version referred to an "Hozier tree;" Osier is a type of willow tree. The lyrics refer to a poisoned wine, usually as "burglar's wine" or "Burgundy wine," sometimes as "Berkeley," "burdelin," "buglers," and earlier as "merkley wine;" this may refer to drugged wine, or possibly to "burgaloo wine," burgaloo being a type of pear (from the French virgalieu). "Burgundy wine" is almost certainly a mondegreen of "burgaloo wine." The weapon used to stab Rose is almost always a "sabre" or a "dagger."

It is usually sung to a tune known as "Rosin the Beau," in 3/4 time.

== Recordings ==
=== Early recordings ===
The song was recorded as "Rose Conley" by G. B. Grayson and Henry Whitter on either 18 November 1927 or 9 October 1928, for the Victor Talking Machine Company (Victor 21625). Wade Mainer and Zeke Morris recorded another version on 2 August 1937 in Charlotte, North Carolina (Bluebird B-7298), giving it the name "Down in the Willow Garden". Charlie Monroe and His Kentucky Pardners recorded another version for RCA Victor on 24 March 1947 (RCA Victor 20-2416, A-side "Bringin' in the Georgia Mail" and RCA Victor 48-0222); this version established the song as a "standard".

=== Later versions ===
The Stanley Brothers recorded the song twice in the mid-1950s. The Osborne Brothers and Red Allen recorded it as "Down in the Willow Garden" in 1956, as did the Kossoy Sisters on their album Bowling Green in the same year. The Everly Brothers recorded a version under the same title for their 1958 album Songs Our Daddy Taught Us, as did Art Garfunkel for his 1973 album Angel Clare.

Ramblin' Jack Elliot released it as "In the Willow Garden" on his 1959 album Ramblin' Jack Elliott in London, Oscar Brand sang "The Willow Garden" on his 1962 live album Morality and the bluegrass duo Lester Flatt and Earl Scruggs recorded it as "Rose Connelly" for their 1965 album The Versatile Flatt & Scruggs. Kenny Hill and the Sweets Mill String Band recorded the song in 1972.

Boyd Rice recorded it as "Down in the Willow Garden" in 1990 for his album Music Martinis and Misanthropy. Kristin Hersh recorded it for her 1998 album of traditional songs, Murder, Misery and Then Goodnight, and Nick Cave and the Bad Seeds released a version, "The Willow Garden", as a B-side to the similarly-plotted murder ballad "Where the Wild Roses Grow".

Holly Hunter sings the song as a lullaby in the 1987 film Raising Arizona, and it is the leitmotif of the film's villain, Leonard Smalls.

Bon Iver and The Chieftains recorded a version of the song for the 2012 album Voice of Ages. This version of the song can be heard during the closing credits of episode four of Fargo season two.

Lankum included a version of the song on their 2017 release titled with the last line of their version of the song: Between the Earth and Sky. Radie Peat also recorded it on her 2026 album No Human Tongue Can Tell, under the title "Willow Garden".

Shakey Graves recorded a version of the song for his 2013 album "Story of My Life". Rufus Wainwright and Brandi Carlile perform the song on his 2023 studio album Folkocracy.
