= A Stranger Here =

Studio album by Ramblin' Jack Elliott
- Released: April 7, 2009
- Recorded: July 21 – 29, 2008
- Genre: Folk, country blues
- Label: ANTI-
- Producer: Joe Henry

Ramblin' Jack Elliott chronology
Vanguard Visionaries (2007)	A Stranger Here (2009)

Professional ratings
Aggregate scores
Source	Rating
Metacritic	81/100
Review scores
Source	Rating
The Boston Phoenix	4/4 stars
Filter	84%
Mojo	3/5 stars
NME	8/10
The Observer	5/5 stars
PopMatters	8/10
Q	3/5 stars
Record Collector	4/5 stars
Slant Magazine	4/5 stars
Under the Radar	7/10

A Stranger Here is an album by American folk musician Ramblin' Jack Elliott, released in 2009. It reached number 5 on the Billboard Top Blues albums charts.

At the 52nd Grammy Awards, A Stranger Here won the Grammy Award for Best Traditional Blues Album.

== Track listing ==
1. "Rising High Water Blues" (Blind Lemon Jefferson) – 3:55
2. "Death Don't Have No Mercy" (Reverend Gary Davis) – 6:08
3. "Rambler's Blues" (Lonnie Johnson) – 5:14
4. "Soul of a Man" (Blind Willie Johnson) – 4:16
5. "Richland Women Blues" (Mississippi John Hurt) – 4:25
6. "Grinnin' in Your Face" (Son House) – 3:55
7. "New Stranger Blues" (Tampa Red) – 3:25
8. "Falling Down Blues" (Furry Lewis) – 4:53
9. "How Long Blues" (Leroy Carr) – 4:44
10. "Please Remember Me" (Walter Davis) – 4:03

== Personnel ==
- Ramblin' Jack Elliott – vocals, guitar
- Greg Leisz – guitar, dobro, mandolin, mandola, Weissenborn
- Jay Bellerose – drums, percussion
- Keith Ciancia – piano, keyboards
- Van Dyke Parks – piano, vibraphone
- David Piltch – upright bass
- David Hidalgo – guitar, accordion

Production notes:

- Joe Henry - producer
- Ryan Freeland – engineer, mixing
- Gavin Lurssen – mastering
- Anabel Sinn – design
- Michael "Mick" Wilson – photography

== Chart positions ==
Year	Chart	Position
2009	Billboard Top Blues Albums	5
