= The Long Ride =

Studio album by Ramblin' Jack Elliott
- Released: September 14, 1999
- Genre: Folk
- Label: High Tone
- Producer: Roy Rogers

Ramblin' Jack Elliott chronology
Friends of Mine (1998)	The Long Ride (1999)	Best of the Vanguard Years (2000)

The Long Ride is an album by the American folk musician Ramblin' Jack Elliott, released in 1999. It was nominated for a Grammy Award, in the "Best Traditional Folk Album" category.

Guests include Dave Van Ronk, Tom Russell, and Maria Muldaur.

== Reception ==
Professional ratings
Review scores
Source	Rating
AllMusic	3/5 stars

Bobby Reed of No Depression wrote that the "duet renditions of old folk tunes are the real meat of this Americana meal ... Elliott’s limited vocal range and spare guitar playing, along with the song’s running time of 7-and-a-half minutes, make for a long, rocky close to this uneven album."

== Track listing ==
1. "Connection" (Mick Jagger, Keith Richards) – 3:09
2. "Cup of Coffee" (Ramblin' Jack Elliott) – 6:16
3. "Ranger's Command" (Woody Guthrie) – 3:30
4. "Pony" (Tom Waits) – 3:23
5. "St. James Infirmary" (Joe Primrose, Traditional) – 3:20
6. "Picture from Life's Other Side" (Traditional) – 5:03
7. "East Virginia Blues" (Carter, Traditional) – 3:59
8. "The Sky Above and the Mud Below" (Tom Russell) – 6:15
9. "Take Me Back and Try Me One More Time" (Ernest Tubb) – 3:27
10. "Now He's Just Dust in the Wind" (Elliott, Roy Rogers) – 4:33
11. "True Blue Jeans" (Elliott, Rogers) – 2:31
12. "Diamond Joe" (Traditional) – 3:17
13. "With God on Our Side" (Bob Dylan) – 7:30

== Personnel ==
- Ramblin' Jack Elliott – vocals, guitar
- Roy Rogers – guitar, slide guitar, pedal steel guitar
- Dave Van Ronk – vocals, guitar (on "St. James Infirmary")
- Tom Russell – vocals (on "Cup of Coffee", "Take Me Back and Try Me One More Time" and "The Sky Above and the Mud Below")
- Maria Muldaur – vocals (on "Picture from Life's Other Side")
- Dave Alvin – guitar, vocals (on "East Virginia Blues")
- Norton Buffalo – harmonica
- Jimmy Sanchez – drums
- Joe Craven – banjo, fiddle, mandolin
- Bruce Gordon – accordion
- Andrew Hardin – guitar
- Derek Jones – bass

Production notes:

- Roy Rogers – producer
- Allen Sudduth – engineer, mixing
- Gene Cornelius – assistant engineer
- Cindy Pascarello – design
- Curtis Martin – artwork, photography, cover photo
- Jan Currie – photography, cover photo
