= Ari Gold (filmmaker) =

American filmmaker, actor and musician (born 1970)

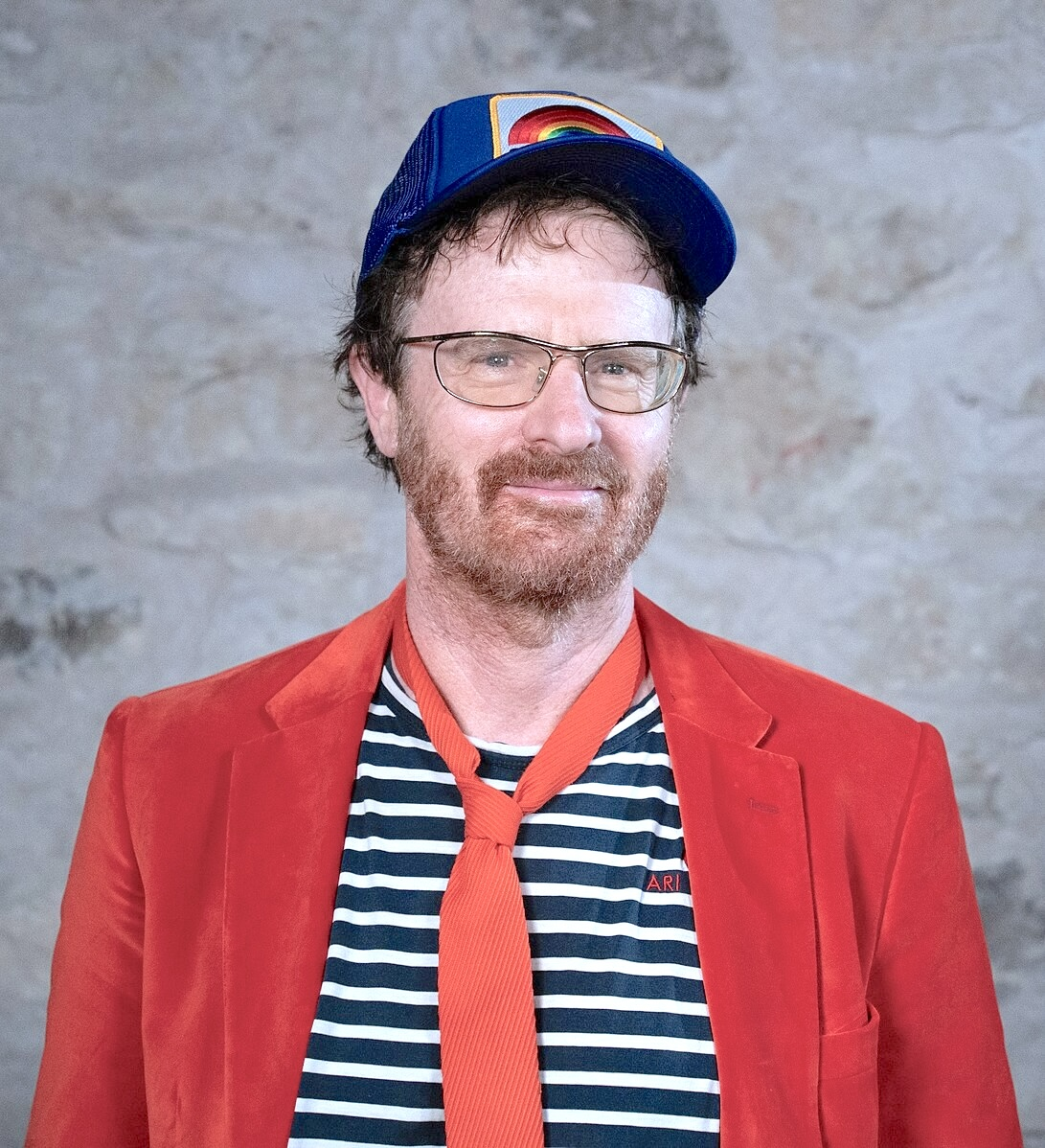
- Ari Gold at SXSW 2025
- Born: 1970 (age 55–56); San Francisco, California, United States
- Education: Columbia University, New York University
- Occupations: Filmmaker; actor; musician
- Parents: Herbert Gold (father); Melissa Dilworth (mother)
- Relatives: J. Richardson Dilworth (grandfather)
- Website: www.arigoldfilms.com

Ari Gold (born 1970) is an American filmmaker, actor and musician. His short film Helicopter was about the aftermath of his mother Melissa Dilworth Gold's 1991 death. His feature debut Adventures of Power premiered at the 2008 Sundance Film Festival and made its European debut at the 2008 Karlovy Vary International Film Festival.

== Early life and education ==
Ari Gold was born in San Francisco, California in 1970. He is the son of American novelist Herbert Gold and Melissa Gold (née Dilworth). His twin brother is musician Ethan Gold, and he has a sister Nina Gold. He also has two half-sisters from his father's first marriage. His mother, Melissa Dilworth, is the daughter of J. Richardson Dilworth, a longtime financial advisor of the Rockefeller family.

He attended New York University (NYU) to study film, and Columbia University, graduating in 1992.

== Career ==
Culture (1999), which Gold directed and starred in, is a 60-second short film, shot entirely in one take with no rehearsal. Gold followed a set of self-imposed rules while making the film, including "only black, white, & primary colors may be used" and "the camera must not move." Culture premiered in the United States at the 1999 Sundance Film Festival, and Reel.com called it "the best sixty seconds of film" at that festival.

Helicopter (2001, copyrighted 2000) is a short film dealing with the aftermath of the death of his mother Melissa in the 1991 Vallejo helicopter crash that also took the life of rock impresario Bill Graham and pilot Steve Kahn. An experimental narrative combining animated sequences and live action, the film was awarded gold in 2000 the Student Academy Awards competition for film students (not to be confused with the official Academy Awards). Gold won High Times Magazine's "Stoner of the Year" award (2001).

Adventures of Power (2008) was written and directed by Gold, and is a cult comedy about a mine worker (played by Gold) who discovers an underground subculture of air-drummers who have the power to change the world.

In 2017, Gold co-wrote and directed the ultra low-budget film The Song of Sway Lake.

Gold produced, directed, and acted in 2025 film Brother Verses Brother. The film was first released at the 2025 SXSW Film Festival.

== Filmography ==
=== Feature films ===
Year	Film	Credited as			
Year	Film	Director	Producer	Writer	Actor
2018	The Song of Sway Lake	Yes	Yes	Yes	Yes
2018	Los Angeles Overnight				Yes
2016	Azure				Yes
2011	FRED Learns to Airdrum with Power				Yes
2011	Lucas Gets Kidnapped!				Yes
2011	Another Earth				Yes
2008	Cyndi Lauper: Into the Nightlife				Yes
2008	Adventures of Power	Yes	Yes	Yes	Yes
2007	Revolution Summer				Yes
2005	The F Word				Yes
2004	Invitation to a Suicide				Yes
2002	Unforeseen				Yes
2002	On_Line				Yes
2001	Plead				Yes
2001	Helicopter	Yes	Yes	Yes	Yes
2001	Eight				Yes
2001	Who Is A.B.?				Yes
2000	Groove				Yes
1999	Culture	Yes		Yes	Yes
1997	All Over Me				Yes
1996	Frog Crossing	Yes		Yes	Yes
1995	Nonstop Pyramid Action	Yes		Yes	Yes
2025	Brother Verses Brother	Yes	Yes		Yes

=== Short films ===
Year	Film	Credited as			
Year	Film	Director	Producer	Writer	Actor
1995	Nonstop Pyramid Action	Yes		Yes	Yes
1996	Frog Crossing	Yes		Yes	Yes
1999	Culture	Yes		Yes	Yes
2001	Helicopter	Yes	Yes	Yes	
2011	Lucas Gets Kidnapped!	Yes		Yes	Yes

== Music ==
Gold is an occasional member of two comedic music projects with The Brothers Gold, with his brother Ethan Gold on guitar; Ari sings and plays ukulele.

Gold sings in the new wave folk band, The Honey Brothers. The Honey Brothers started small in 2001, a few college friends singing for people on the street corners of New York. Since then, they have released two studio albums, one live album, and made a guest appearance on the TV show, 90210. The other core members of The Honey Brothers are Andrew Vladeck, Daniel Posner, and Adrian Grenier. Ethan Gold is a former member of the band; in 2010 he was replaced by Dan Green.
