= Vanguard Visionaries (Ramblin' Jack Elliott album) =

Compilation album by Ramblin' Jack Elliott
- Released: June 12, 2007
- Genre: Folk
- Length: 32:41
- Label: Vanguard

Ramblin' Jack Elliott chronology
I Stand Alone (2006)	Vanguard Visionaries (2007)	A Stranger Here (2009)

Vanguard Visionaries is the title of a recording by American folk music artist Ramblin' Jack Elliott, released in 2007.

== History ==
Vanguard Records had a high profile during the 1960s folk revival and released music by many folk artists such as Doc Watson, Odetta, John Fahey and many others. To celebrate their 60th anniversary, Vanguard released a series of artist samplers called Vanguard Visionaries from the 1960s and early-'70s era.

== Reception ==
Professional ratings
Review scores
Source	Rating
Allmusic	3.5/5 stars

Writing for Allmusic, music critic John Bush wrote of the album "Vanguard Visionaries, a ten-track compilation sans liner notes, can't possibly do more than scratch the surface of Ramblin' Jack Elliott's career. Still, it's true that Elliott recorded much great work on Vanguard, and there's no question that these songs... are among the best of his Vanguard work."

== Track listing ==
All songs Traditional unless otherwise noted.

1. "1913 Massacre" (Woody Guthrie) – 3:49
2. "Will the Circle Be Unbroken" – 2:36
3. "Don't Think Twice, It's All Right" (Bob Dylan) – 3:16
4. "John Hardy" – 2:26
5. "Guabi Guabi" (Traditional, Jack Elliott) – 4:41
6. "House of the Rising Sun" – 3:27
7. "Black Snake Moan" – 3:25
8. "Roving Gambler" – 3:33
9. "Diamond Joe" – 2:56
10. "I Got a Woman" – 2:32

== Personnel ==
- Ramblin' Jack Elliott – vocals, guitar, harmonica
