= Country Style (album) =

Studio album by Ramblin' Jack Elliott
- Released: 1962
- Genre: Folk
- Label: Prestige/Folklore
- Producer: Kenneth S. Goldstein

Ramblin' Jack Elliott chronology
Jack Elliott at the Second Fret (1962)	Country Style (1962)	Jack Elliott (1964)

Alternative Cover
- Cover of the reissue of Country Style and Jack Elliott at the Second Fret

Country Style is an album by American folk musician Ramblin' Jack Elliott, released in 1962.

== Reception ==
Professional ratings
Review scores
Source	Rating
Allmusic	4/5 stars

Writing for Allmusic, music critic Ronnie D. Lankford Jr. wrote the album "On Country Style, one can see the rambling doctor's son come into his own as a performer... Elliott steps away from the past to carve out an irreverent, slap-happy style that showed that folk music, when handled without studious care, could be a helluva lot of fun... Country Style represents the first flowering of Elliott's talent and turning point for folk traditionalism."

== Reissues ==
- Country Style was reissued on CD by Fantasy Records in 1999 along with Jack Elliott at the Second Fret.

== Track listing ==
All songs Traditional unless otherwise noted.

=== Side one ===
1. "Mean Mama Blues" (Charles Mitchell, Moon Mullican)
2. "Low and Lonely" (Fred Rose)
3. "Wreck of the Old '97" (Henry Clay Work)
4. "Old Shep" (Red Foley)
5. "Wabash Cannonball" (A. P. Carter)
6. "Brown Eyes"
7. "Lovesick Blues" (Cliff Friend, Irving Mills)

=== Side two ===
1. "Arthritis Blues" (Butch Hayes)
2. "Take Me Back and Love Me One More Time"
3. "Tennessee Stud" (Jimmy Driftwood)
4. "Those Brown Eyes" (Alan Arkin, Bill Carey, Erik Darling, Woody Guthrie)
5. "Detour" (Paul Westmoreland)
6. "Soldier's Last Letter" (Ernest Tubb, Redd Stewart)

== Personnel ==
- Ramblin' Jack Elliott – vocals, harmonica, guitar

Technical

- Hal Lustig - recording
- Don Schlitten - design, photography
