= Country Style (Australian TV series) =

- Genre: Variety
- Country of origin: Australia
- Original language: English

Original release
- Network: ABC Television
- Release: 1958 – 1958

Country Style is an Australian television variety series which aired on ABC during 1958. ABC series typically had shorter seasons than shows on commercial television, which was also the case with Country Style.

It would appear the series aired for more episodes in Sydney than in Melbourne. In Melbourne it aired on Saturdays, while in Sydney it aired on Wednesdays.

Performers who appeared on the series included the Balamindi Harmony Club, singer Pat Spencer, singer Frank Ifield, violinist Geza Bachman dance caller Garry Cohen, singer Myrna Dodd, and singer Geoff Horner

At least a couple episodes of this series still exist, and are held as 16mm kinescope recordings by National Archives of Australia
