= Ramblin' Jack Elliott =

American folk singer and storyteller (born 1931)

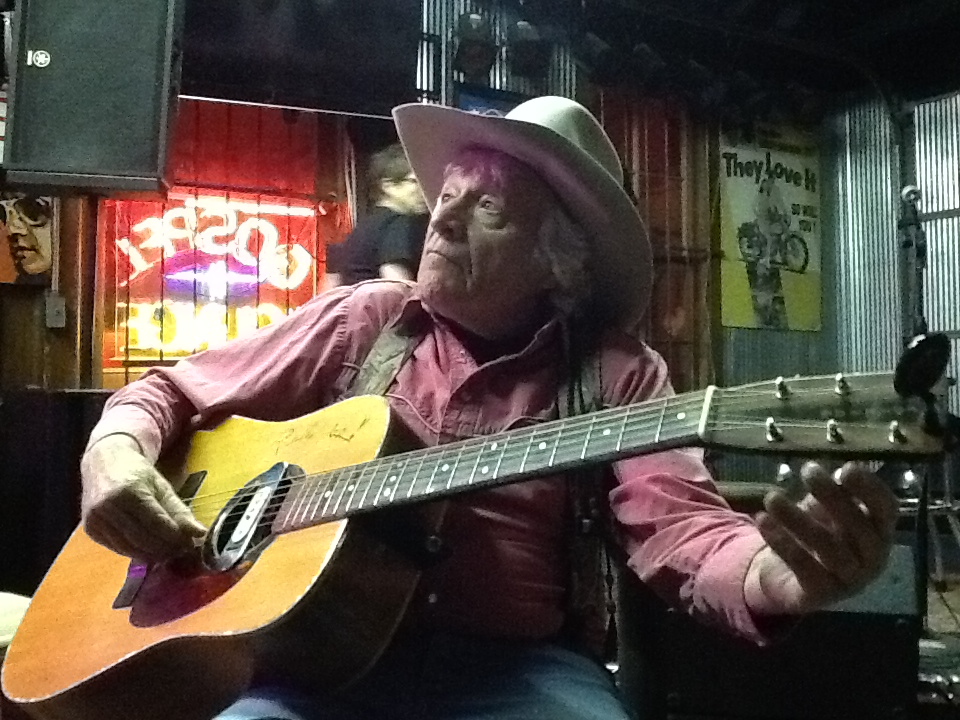
- Elliott at Knuckleheads Saloon in 2013

Background information
- Born: Elliott Charles Adnopoz; August 1, 1931 (age 95); New York City, U.S.
- Genre: Folk music
- Occupations: Musician; songwriter; singer
- Instruments: Guitar; vocals; harmonica
- Website: ramblinjackelliott.com

Ramblin' Jack Elliott (born Elliott Charles Adnopoz; August 1, 1931) is an American folk singer, songwriter, and storyteller.

== Life and career ==
Elliott was born in 1931 in Brooklyn, New York City, the son of Florence (Rieger) and Abraham Adnopoz, an eminent doctor. His family was Jewish. He attended Midwood High School in Brooklyn and graduated in 1949. Elliott grew up in Midwood, Brooklyn and inspired by the rodeos at Madison Square Garden and wanted to be a cowboy. Encouraged instead to follow his father's example and become a surgeon, Elliott rebelled, running away from home at the age of 15 to join Col. Jim Eskew's Rodeo, the only rodeo east of the Mississippi. They traveled throughout the Mid-Atlantic states and New England.

Elliott was with them for only three months before his parents tracked him down and had him sent home, but he had been exposed to his first singing cowboy, Brahmer Rogers, a rodeo clown who played guitar and five-string banjo, sang songs, and recited poetry. Back home, Elliott taught himself guitar and started busking for a living. Eventually, he got together with Woody Guthrie and stayed with him as an admirer and student.

Nobody I know—and I mean nobody—has covered more ground and made more friends and sung more songs than the fellow you're about to meet right now. He's got a song and a friend for every mile behind him. Say hello to my good buddy, Ramblin' Jack Elliott.

— Johnny Cash, The Johnny Cash Show, 1969

With banjo player Derroll Adams, he toured the United Kingdom and Europe. By 1960, he had recorded three folk albums for the UK record label Topic Records. In London, he played small clubs and pubs by day and West End cabaret nightclubs at night. In 1963 while in London, on one or possibly more occasions he recorded two songs in front of a live television audience for the UK regional television folk and blues music series Hullabaloo, presented by the Scottish folksinger Rory McEwen; these sessions were released on DVD in 2020. When he returned to the States, Elliott found he had become renowned in American folk music circles.

Woody Guthrie had the greatest influence on Elliott. Guthrie's son, Arlo, said that because of Woody's illness and early death, Arlo never really got to know him, but learned his father's songs and performing style from Elliott and, according to Arlo, Woody Guthrie once said that Jack Elliot "Sounds more like me than I do". Elliott's guitar and his mastery of Guthrie's material had a significant impact on Bob Dylan when he lived in Minneapolis. When he reached New York, Dylan was sometimes referred to as the 'son' of Jack Elliott, because Elliott had a way of introducing Dylan's songs with the words: "Here's a song from my son, Bob Dylan." Dylan rose to prominence as a songwriter; Elliott continued as an interpretative troubadour, bringing old songs to new audiences in his idiosyncratic manner. Elliott also influenced Phil Ochs, played guitar, and sang harmony on Ochs's cover of the song "Joe Hill" from the Tape from California album. Elliott also discovered singer-songwriter Guthrie Thomas in a bar in Northern California in 1973, bringing Thomas to Hollywood, where Thomas's music career began.

Elliott appeared in Dylan's 1975–1976 Rolling Thunder Revue concert tour, and played "Longheno de Castro" in Dylan's movie Renaldo and Clara accompanied by guitarist Arlen Roth. In the movie, he sings the song "South Coast" by Lillian Bos Ross and Sam Eskin, whose lyric the character's name is derived from.

My name is Longheno de Castro
My father was a Spanish grandee
But I won my wife in a card game
To Hell with those lords o'er the sea

Elliott also appears briefly in the 1983 film Breathless, starring Richard Gere and directed by Jim McBride.

Elliott plays guitar in both traditional flatpicking and fingerpicking styles, depending on the song, which he matches with his laconic, humorous storytelling, sometimes accompanying himself on harmonica. His singing has a strained, nasal quality, which young Bob Dylan copies. His repertoire includes traditional American music from various genres, including country, blues, bluegrass and folk.

Elliott's nickname comes not from his traveling habits but rather from the countless stories he relates before answering the simplest of questions. Folk singer Odetta claimed that her mother gave him the name, remarking, "Oh, Jack Elliott, yeah, he can sure ramble on!"

His image as a folksy, down-to-earth country boy, despite being a Jewish doctor's son from Brooklyn, and his disdain for other folk singers, were parodied in the fictional documentary A Mighty Wind in the character of a former member of the New Main Street Singers, Ramblin' Sandy Pitnick, a somewhat geeky-looking white man in a cowboy hat. The film's central band of folksingers, the Folksmen (Christopher Guest, Michael McKean, and Harry Shearer), are said to have scored a hit album called Ramblin'.

In 1995, Elliott's first recording in many years, South Coast, earned him his first Grammy Award. He was awarded the National Medal of Arts in 1998.

His long career and strained relationship with his daughter Aiyana was chronicled in her 2000 film documentary, The Ballad of Ramblin' Jack.

At the age of 75, he changed labels and released I Stand Alone on the ANTI- label, with an assortment of guest backup players including members of Wilco, X, and the Red Hot Chili Peppers. The album was produced by Ian Brennan. Elliott said his intention was to title the album Not for the Tourists, because it was recorded partially in response to his daughter's request for songs he loved but never played in concert. When asked why he did not, he told her, "These songs are not for the tourists."

In 2012, he was featured on the song "Double Lifetime" on the album Older Than My Old Man Now by Loudon Wainwright III.

Elliott has been identified as an inspiration for the character of Al Cody (Adam Driver) in the 2013 film Inside Llewyn Davis, written and directed by Joel and Ethan Coen.

Elliott appeared with the Ramblin' Jackernacle Choir, adding vocals, yodels, hollers, to Bob Weir's 2016 solo album Blue Mountain, on the track "Ki-Yi Bossie".

== Discography ==
=== Studio ===
- 1956: Woody Guthrie's Blues
- 1957: Jack Elliot Sings
- 1958: Jack Takes the Floor
- 1959: Ramblin' Jack Elliott in London EMI Records
- 1960: Ramblin' Jack Elliott Sings Songs by Woody Guthrie and Jimmie Rodgers
- 1960: Jack Elliott Sings the Songs of Woody Guthrie
- 1961: Songs to Grow On by Woody Guthrie, Sung by Jack Elliott (Folkways Records)
- 1961: Ramblin' Jack Elliott (Prestige/Folklore)
- 1962: Country Style (Prestige/Folklore)
- 1964: Jack Elliott (Vanguard)
- 1968: Young Brigham (Reprise)
- 1970: Bull Durham Sacks & Railroad Tracks (Reprise)
- 1981: Kerouac's Last Dream (Folk Freak/re-release by Conträr Musik, Germany)
- 1995: South Coast (Red House)
- 1998: Friends of Mine (HighTone)
- 1999: The Long Ride (HighTone)
- 2006: I Stand Alone (ANTI-)
- 2009: A Stranger Here (ANTI-)

=== Live ===
- 1957: The Lost Topic Tapes: Isle of Wight 1957
- 1962: Jack Elliott at the Second Fret

=== With Derroll Adams ===
- 1958: The Rambling Boys
- 1963: Roll On Buddy
- 1969: Folkland Songs
- 1969: Riding in Folkland
- 1975: America
- 2025: Folkland Songs - (CD) Strictly Country Records
- 2025: Riding in Folkland - (CD) Strictly Country Records

=== Compilations ===
- 1963: Talking Woody Guthrie (Topic)
- 1964: Muleskinner (Topic)
- 1976: The Essential Ramblin' Jack Elliott (Vanguard)
- 1989: Hard Travelin' (reissue of Jack Elliott Sings the Songs of Woody Guthrie and Ramblin' Jack Elliott)
- 1989: Talking Dust Bowl: The Best of Ramblin' Jack Elliott
- 1990: Ramblin' Jack Elliott, Spider John Koerner, U. Utah Phillips: Legends of Folk (Red House)
- 1990: Jack Elliott Plus / Jack Elliott
- 1995: Me and Bobby McGee (reissue of Young Brigham and Bull Durham Sacks & Railroad Tracks)
- 1995: Jack Elliott: Ramblin' Jack, The Legendary Topic Masters
- 1999: Ramblin' Jack Elliott: Early Sessions
- 2000: Best of the Vanguard Years
- 2004: The Lost Topic Tapes: Cowes Harbour 1957
- 2004: The Lost Topic Tapes: Isle of Wight 1957
- 2007: Vanguard Visionaries
- 2023: Ramblin' Jack Elliott – 100 Classic Recordings 1954-62 (Label: Acrobat – ACQCD 7174)

Additionally, Three Score and Ten, Topic Records' 70th-anniversary boxed set released in 2009, included "Talking Dustbowl Blues" from Woody Guthrie's Blues as track twelve on the seventh CD.
