= Derroll Adams =

American musician (1925–2000)

- Adams busking in Saint-Tropez, France, in 1957

Background information
- Born: Derroll Lewis Thompson; November 27, 1925; Portland, Oregon, United States
- Died: February 6, 2000 (aged 74) Antwerp, Belgium
- Genres: Folk
- Occupation: Singer-songwriter
- Instrument(s): Guitar, banjo, vocals
- Website: derrolladams.org

Derroll Adams (November 27, 1925 – February 6, 2000) was an American folk musician.

== Biography ==
He was born Derroll Lewis Thompson in Portland, Oregon, United States. Aged 16 at the time of the attack on Pearl Harbor, December 7, 1941, he volunteered in the Army (Fort Stevens), but was discharged when his true age of 16 was discovered. Later, he was drafted into the Coast Guard.

A tall, lanky banjo player with a deep voice, he was busking around the West Coast music scene in the 1950s when he met Ramblin' Jack Elliott in the Topanga Canyon area of Los Angeles. The two traveled around and recorded albums, among which were Cowboys and The Rambling Boys.

His recording career was somewhat uneven, and like Elliott he was better known for whom he influenced—Donovan, among others—than for his own art. With Elliott, he had gone to England to play live and record. Elliott went back, but Adams stayed. He took Donovan, who had been playing around the UK with Gypsy Dave, under his wing as a sort of protégé; as a result, the influence of American traditional music can be distinctly heard in Donovan's earlier work, including the song "Epistle To Derroll".

In celebration of Adams 65th birthday, a concert featuring Allan Taylor, Wizz Jones, former members of Pentangle and Happy Traum, plus Adams former travelling partner Elliott, was recorded and released on album.

Adams died in Antwerp, Belgium, in February 2000, aged 74. His collaboration with Elliott left behind a body of influence that prevails today. Topic Records has made most of his and Elliott's recordings available on CD.

== Discography ==
Solo projects

- 1967: Portland Town
- 1972: Feelin' Fine
- 1974: Movin' On
- 1977: Along the Way
- 1978: Folk Friends, double LP recorded in Germany with Davey Arthur, Alex Campbell, Guy & Candie Carawan, Finbar Furey (The Fureys), Wizz Jones, Werner Lämmerhirt and Hannes Wader.
- 1994: Derroll Adams LIVE
- 1997: Songs of the Banjoman
- 2002: Banjoman – a tribute to Derroll Adams, Blue Groove BG-1420
- 2016: Live in Haarlem 1977, SCR-78 StrictlyCountryRecords.com.

With Ramblin' Jack Elliott

- 1957: The Rambling Boys
- 1963: Roll On Buddy
- 1969: Folkland Songs
- 1969: Riding in Folkland
- 1975: America
- 2025: Folkland Songs remastered CD only - StrictlyCountryRecords.com
- 2025: Riding in Folkland remastered CD only - StrictlyCountryRecords.com

== Sources ==
- Williams, Paul: Bob Dylan Performing Artist vols. 1–3 (a.k.a. The Early Years, The Middle Years and Mind Out of Time, respectively)
- Pennebaker, D. A.: Dont Look Back
- Donovan: Troubadour: The Definitive Collection 1964–1976
- Folk Freak Plattenproduktion Folk Friends 1978
