= San Francisco Bay Blues =

Song by Jesse Fuller

"San Francisco Bay Blues" is an American folk song and is generally considered to be the most famous composition by Jesse Fuller. Fuller first recorded the song in 1954, which was released by the World Song label in 1955. A "one-man band" rendition of the song featuring a kazoo solo was recorded by Fuller during a 1962 concert. It appears on a Smithsonian Folkways compilation, Friends of Old Time Music.

Topic Records issued the original Jesse Fuller version on a 10-inch vinyl LP called Working on the Railroad in 1959 and included it as track six of the first CD of the Topic Records 70 year anniversary boxed set Three Score and Ten.

During the 1960s American boom in popular commercial recordings of folk and folk-inspired music, the song was recorded by more than a dozen soloists and folk groups, including Eric Clapton, Ramblin' Jack Elliott, the Weavers, the Rooftop Singers, Tom Rush, Richie Havens, and Peter Paul and Mary. Since Fuller's introduction, there have been at least 88 recordings of the song in English and other languages, including jazz band arrangements as well as folk-pop groups according to the online database Second Hand Songs.
