= Can the Circle Be Unbroken (By and By) =

Single by Carter Family
- B-side: "Glory to the Lamb"
- Published: June 22, 1935 by Southern Music Publishing Co., Inc., New York.
- Released: August 1935
- Recorded: May 6, 1935
- Genre: Gospel, Country, American folk
- Length: 3:07
- Label: Banner 33465
- Songwriters: Ada R. Habershon and Charles H. Gabriel, reworked by A. P. Carter

Carter Family singles chronology
"He Took a White Rose from Her Hair" (1935)	"Can the Circle Be Unbroken (By and By)" (1935)	"Behind Those Stone Walls" (1936)

"Can the Circle Be Unbroken (By and By)" is a country/folk song reworked by A. P. Carter from the hymn "Will the Circle Be Unbroken?" by Ada R. Habershon and Charles H. Gabriel. The song's lyrics concern the death, funeral, and mourning of the narrator's mother.

The song first gained attention due to the Carter Family. The song has been recorded by many groups and musicians: Blind James Campbell, Bob Dylan, The Band, The Staple Singers, Clara Ward Singers, John Fahey, Roy Acuff, Joan Baez, The Chieftains, Jerry Lee Lewis, Gene Vincent, Ralph Stanley, The Black Crowes, Kristin Hersh, John Lee Hooker, Bill Monroe, the Nitty Gritty Dirt Band, The 13th Floor Elevators, Robert Byrd, Pentangle, Spacemen 3, Country Joe McDonald, John Statz, Spirit of the West with The Wonder Stuff, Mavis Staples, The Felice Brothers, Johnny Cash, Gregg Allman, the Neville Brothers, Jeff Buckley, Moby, and Agnes Chan. Its refrain was incorporated into the Carl Perkins song "Daddy Sang Bass" and the Atlanta song "Sweet Country Music". It is primarily performed in gospel, bluegrass and folk, but versions in other genres exist. Most versions of the song use the alternate title "Will the Circle Be Unbroken". In 1998, it was inducted into the Grammy Hall of Fame.

Almost all cover versions of the song use a straight 4/4 meter throughout, while the Carter Family recording from 1927 uses bars of 3/4 near the end of each verse and twice in the chorus.

== Adaptations ==
In 1988, springing from the Great Hudson River "Clearwater" Revivals (now referred to as Festivals) which Pete Seeger championed from the mid-1960s through the present, the second line of the chorus was rewritten and copyrighted by Cathy Winter, Betsy Rose, Marcia Taylor and Terry Dash as "Rise Up Singing":

Will the circle be unbroken, by and by Lord by and by.
There's a better way to live now, we can have it if we try.
I was born down in the valley where the sun refused to shine
but now I'm climbing - up to the highlands - Gonna make all those mountains mine.

The song's refrain and lyrics were worked into the track "High & Hurt" by the Danish band Iceage, featured on their 2021 album Seek Shelter. Tonstartssbandht included it in the medleys of their 2014 tour as featured in the Overseas live album.

== In popular culture ==
The song plays a prominent role in the film Broken Circle Breakdown.

A version of the song was performed by Jennifer Nettles and Kevin Bacon, together with Beth Grant and Maxwell Jenkins, in season 1, episode 7 of the 2025 Amazon TV series The Bondsman.

== Published version ==
- Rise Up Singing, page 98
