= List of Foggy Mountain Boys members =

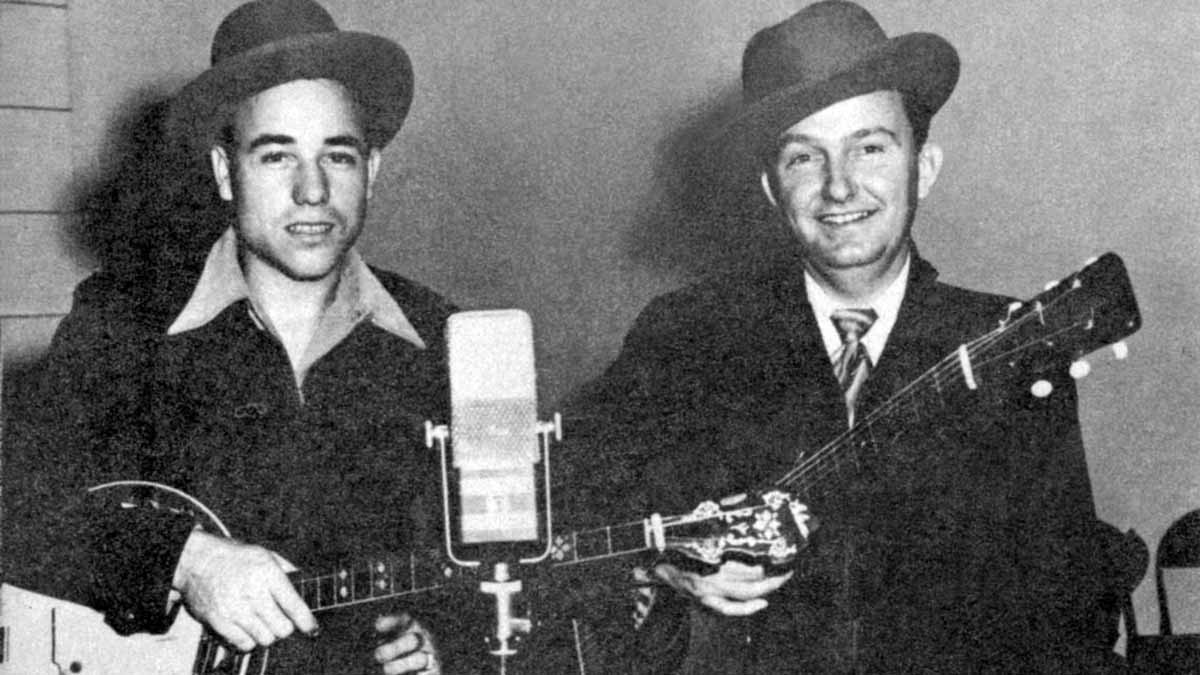
The Foggy Mountain Boys were the backing band for banjo player Earl Scruggs (left) and guitarist-vocalist Lester Flatt (right).

The Foggy Mountain Boys were the backing band for bluegrass duo Lester Flatt and Earl Scruggs. Formed after the pair's departure from Bill Monroe's Blue Grass Boys in early 1948, the group were active until March 1969, when the pair parted ways due to musical differences. Flatt, Scruggs and the Foggy Mountain Boys are cited as one of the most influential groups and featured numerous members during their tenure. In addition to Flatt and Scruggs, the band's original lineup featured guitarist Homer "Jim" Eanes and bassist Howard "Cedric Rainwater" Watts. By the time they disbanded, the group included guitarist fiddler Paul Warren (from 1954), bassist English "Jake" Tullock (from 1954 to 1955, and from 1958), dobro player Burkett "Josh" Graves (from 1955) and Howard "Johnny" Johnson (from 1963).

== History ==
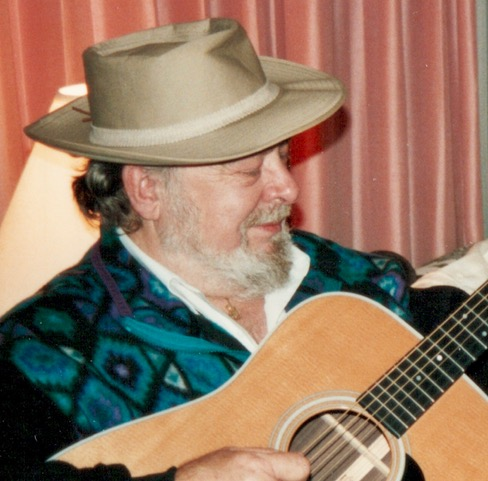
Mac Wiseman was second guitarist and tenor vocalist for the band's first recording session.

=== 1948–1950 ===
A couple of weeks after a final performance at the end of February 1948, guitarist-vocalist Lester Flatt, banjo player Earl Scruggs and bassist Howard "Cedric Rainwater" Watts all left Bill Monroe's Blue Grass Boys to form their own group, the Foggy Mountain Boys (FMB), which was completed with the addition of second guitarist Homer "Jim" Eanes. After just a few weeks, however, Eanes was invited to join Monroe's band, which he accepted. Flatt, Scruggs and Watts moved to Hickory, North Carolina and enlisted Jim Shumate, another Blue Grass Boys alumnus, as their new band's first fiddler. The band spent all of April performing a regular radio show on WHKY, before hiring Mac Wiseman at the end of the month and moving to Bristol, Virginia, where they secured a slot on WCYB thanks to Wiseman's previous work on the station.

With the five-piece lineup of Flatt, Scruggs, Wiseman, Shumate and Watts, the FMB signed with Mercury Records and recorded their first four tracks in the fall of 1948, which were released across two singles in early 1949. Wiseman decided to leave the band around Christmas time, with Shumate following shortly thereafter to return to Hickory. He was replaced in the lineup by the original Blue Grass Boys fiddler, Art Wooten. To replace tenor vocalist Wiseman, Flatt hired mandolinist John "Curly" Seckler in March 1949, who joined from Hoke Jenkins' Smoky Mountaineers. After they relocated again to Knoxville, Tennessee, the new lineup's first recording sessions took place in "April or May" that year and spawned another two singles for Mercury. By September, Wooten had moved on and Benny Sims had taken over as the FMB's fiddler.

The band's next recording sessions in December spawned four singles. "No Mother or Dad" featured as its B-side the instrumental "Foggy Mountain Breakdown", which would go on to be recognised as one of the band's (and the genre's) most popular and well-known compositions. Around February or March 1950, the group moved again to Versailles, Kentucky. Shortly thereafter, they hired Chuck Johnson as their booking agent and later added him to their comedy routine, for which he adopted the stage name "Jody Rainwater" and performed as Watts' character Cedric's younger brother. In May, just a few weeks after his addition to the show, Johnson took over bass and bass vocals from Watts, who left just before the band moved back to Bristol, Virginia. He later joined Hank Williams' band, the Drifting Cowboys. In September, the band moved again to Tampa, Florida, where they recorded their final six tracks for Mercury the next month.

=== 1950–1955 ===
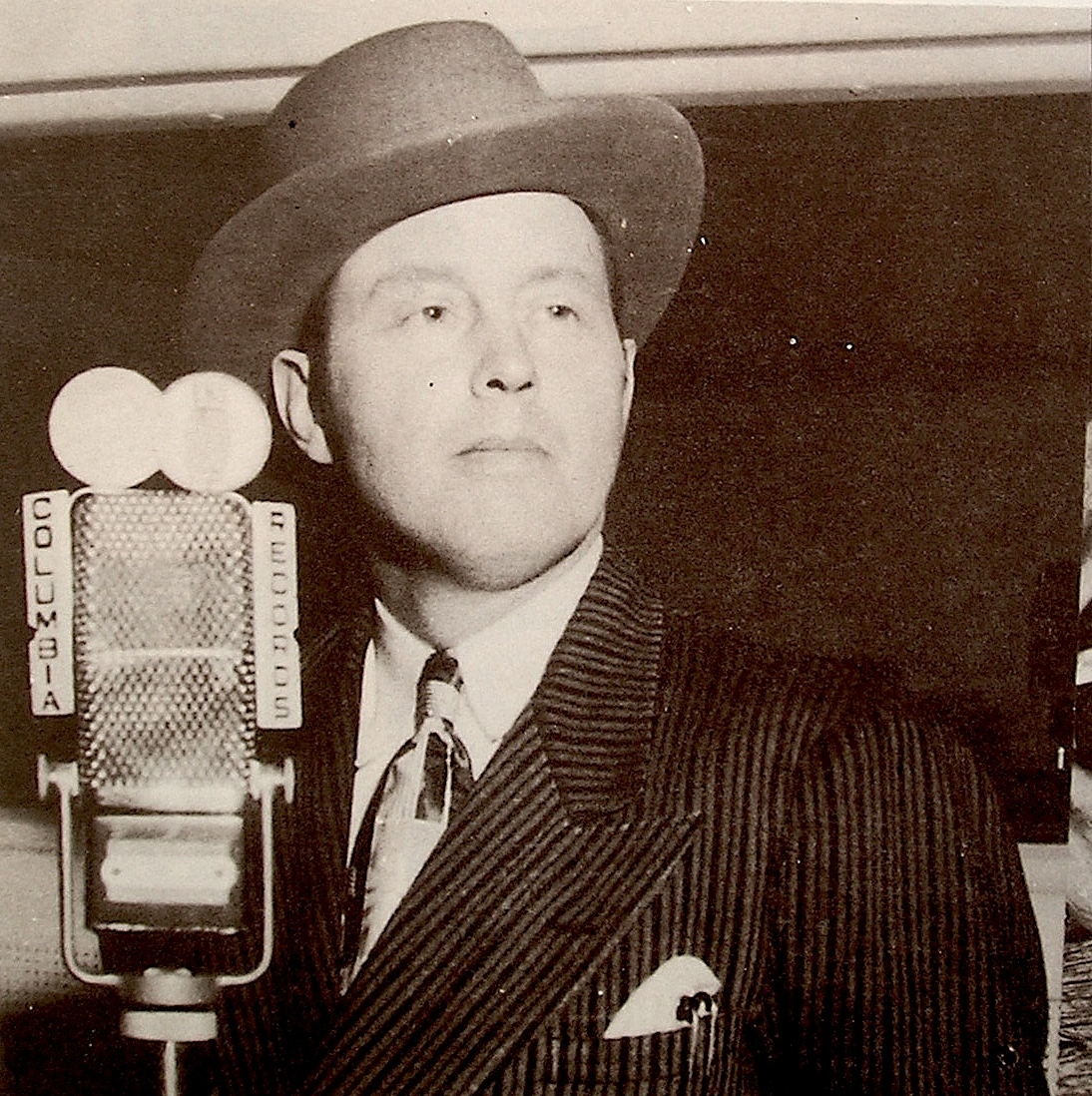
Many musicians hired by Flatt and Scruggs were fellow alumni of Bill Monroe's Blue Grass Boys.

The FMB moved back to Kentucky, signed with Columbia Records, and recorded their first tracks for the label in November 1950. The next month, Sims was replaced by another former Bill Monroe fiddler, Robert "Chubby" Wise. Seckler also left in March 1951 after what his manager Penny Parsons described as "a disagreement that no one seemed to remember", with Everett Lilly taking his place in time for a session in May. In August, the group moved to Roanoke, Virginia for a show on WDBJ, during which time Wise was replaced by a returning Art Wooten. For a session in October, former Blue Grass Boy Howdy Forrester stood in on fiddle. Shortly after the band moved to Raleigh, North Carolina at the start of 1952, Wooten was replaced by yet another former Monroe former fiddler, Benny Martin. After the first weekend of June, Jody Rainwater left Flatt and Scruggs to work as a disc jockey at WSVS in Crewe, Virginia. He was replaced by Charles "Kentucky Slim" Elza.

Around a week into September, Lilly also left the group to join Tex Logan's band, with Curly Seckler returning just as the group moved back to Knoxville, Tennessee. Not long after the move back to Knoxville, Howard Watts returned to the FMB to replace Elza, who Parsons described as a "mediocre bass player". The group recorded four new singles in November, before Watts left again in the early spring of 1953 as he was unhappy being a salaried employee rather than an equal partner as he had been originally. Watts was not replaced officially at first, with bass handled by stand-ins Lonnie "Red" Murphy (possibly), Roy "Junior" Huskey and Bob Moore over the next few months, during which time the band moved to Nashville, Tennessee. The next two FMB sessions, in late August 1953, featured Moore on bass and Louis Innis on second guitar.

Around February 1954, the band moved back to Knoxville and brought in two new members: fiddler Paul Warren and bassist Joe Stuart. Stuart was replaced by English "Jake" Tullock in May, just before the band's next recording session that month. The group moved again in August to Crewe, Virginia, then over the Christmas period moved back to Nashville, where they would stay for the rest of their career. Their next recording session, in January 1955, featured guest rhythm guitarist Eddie Hill. By March, Tullock had left the band due to "health problems", with bass handled over the next couple of months by stand-ins Benny Williams, Hoke Jenkins and Joe Stuart. In May, the band hired Burkett "Josh" Graves as Tullock's replacement, although after a two-week trial he chose to primarily play dobro, and Charles Elza returned to the lineup on bass.

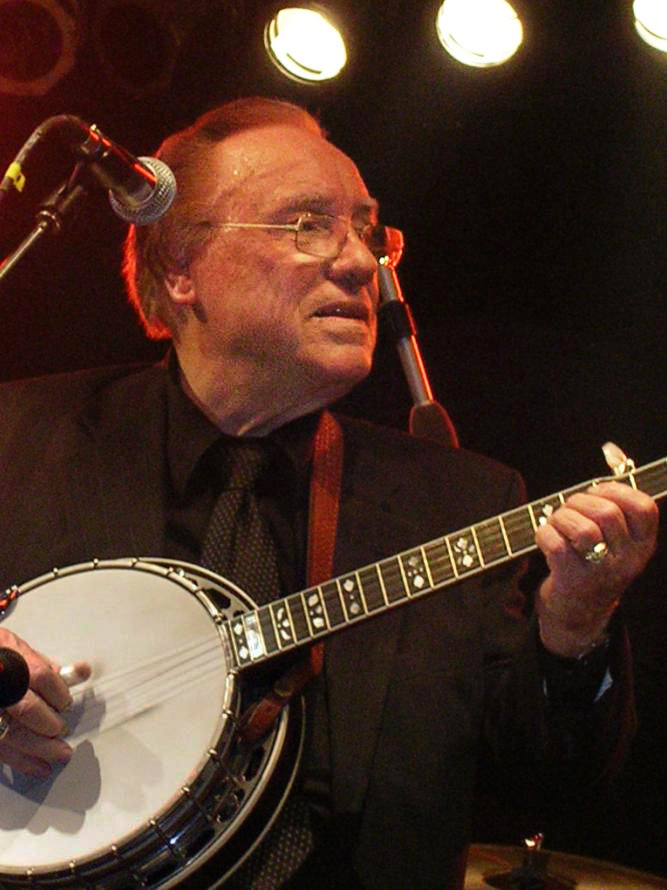
Scruggs was seriously injured in a road traffic accident in October 1955, forcing him out of action for many months.

=== 1955–1962 ===
After several months of guest performances on the show, Flatt, Scruggs and the FMB made their first advertised appearance on the Grand Ole Opry in early June 1955, before becoming official members in September. The first two recording sessions with Josh Graves took place at the beginning of that month, the first featuring Loren "Jack" Shook on rhythm guitar and Ernie Newton on bass, and the second featuring Chet Atkins on rhythm guitar and Bob Moore on bass. A month later, Scruggs and his wife were injured in a road traffic accident on the way to visit his mother, who was in hospital after suffering a stroke. He was hospitalised for several weeks and later underwent several surgeries, which left him unable to tour for eight months. The group continued performing, with Curtis McPeake, Donnie Bryant and Haskel McCormick filling in on banjo.

Scruggs was able to return to the band full-time in the spring of 1956. Around the same time, Onie Wheeler took over bass duties from Elza, who remained as a comedian. Wheeler debuted in the studio at the band's next session in May, which also featured guest guitarist Harold Bradley. By early 1957 he had left, with bass handled at sessions in January and March by Howard Watts and Junior Huskey, respectively. Frank "Hylo" Brown took over from the spring, debuting at a session in July. He remained until the beginning of 1958, when he was replaced by the returning Jake Tullock (comedian Elza, "Kentucky Slim", also left the wider group around the same time). Before Tullock's arrival, the band recorded two singles in January with session bassist Ike Inman. In April, the group (with Tullock) recorded four gospel tracks released as two singles.

A few weeks after the April 26, 1958 session, Curly Seckler left Flatt and Scruggs' band for the second time after a "falling out" with Flatt. He was replaced for the rest of the year by his previous replacement Everett Lilly, before he left again at the end of the year and the band brought in Richard "Curley" Lambert to take his place. After a session in January 1959, Brown returned to the band on bass, with Tullock switching to guitar for the next session in April. In May, Seckler returned and Brown left again. In August and October that year, the band recorded their first album, Songs of Glory. In April 1960, they added drums to their recordings for the first time, working with Murrey "Buddy" Harman on the singles "The Great Historical Bum" and "Polka on a Banjo". They recorded Foggy Mountain Banjo in August and September without Seckler.

The band continued recording throughout 1961 and early 1962, working with drummers Doug Kirkham and John Greubel and guest guitarist Maybelle Carter. In late March 1962, Seckler was dismissed from the band, with Scruggs telling the mandolinist that the decision was made because they were "going to reduce the band some". Josh Graves recalls that it was Flatt's decision to fire Seckler.

=== 1962–1969 ===
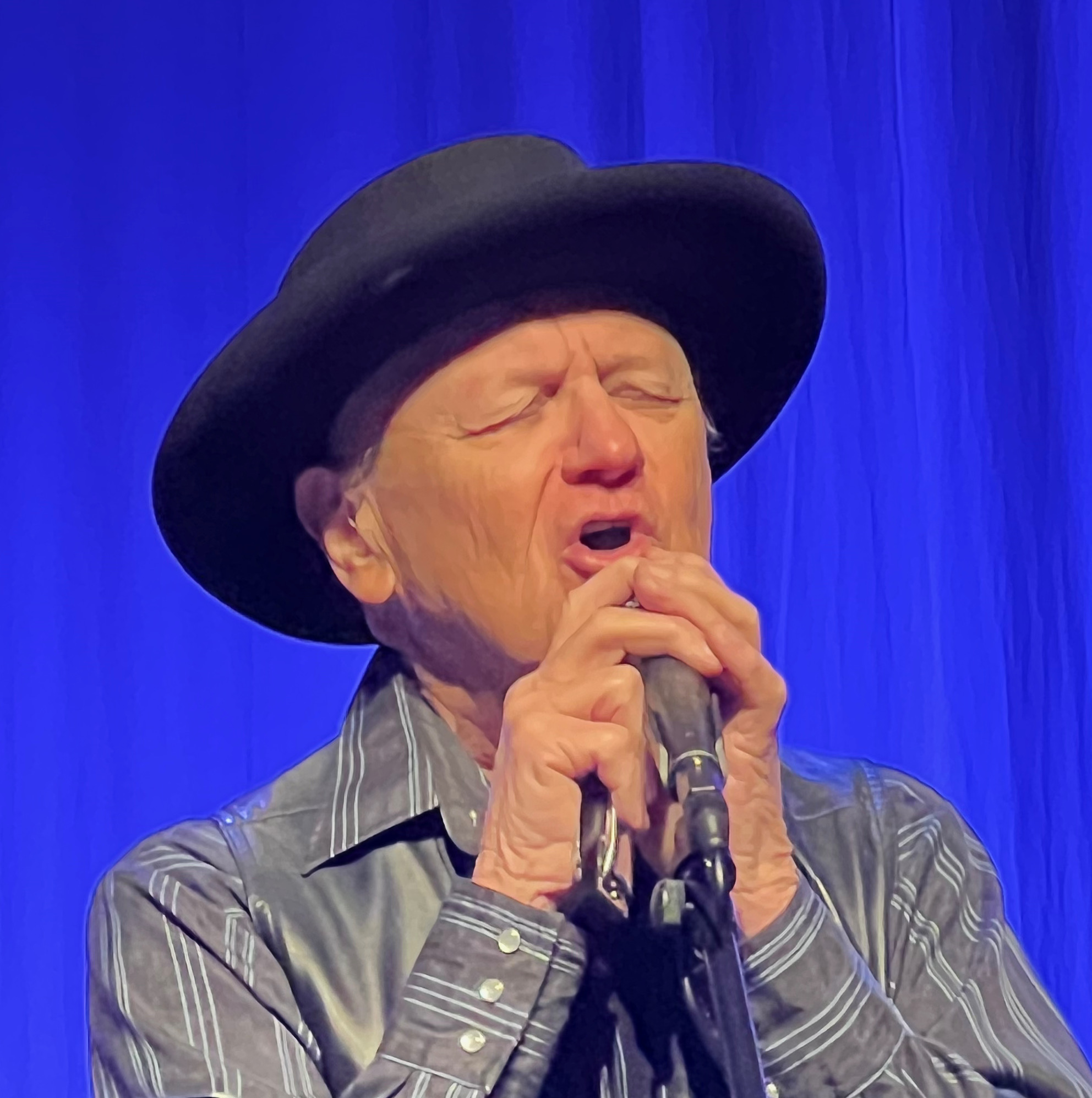
Harmonica player Charlie McCoy performed at numerous Foggy Mountain Boys sessions from 1964 to 1969.

Flatt, Scruggs, Warren, Graves and Tullock continued as a five-piece, recording "The Ballad of Jed Clampett" in September 1962 and the album Hard Travelin' the following month. Less than a year after downsizing, they returned to a six-piece towards the end of the year with the addition of Billy Powers on guitar, who debuted on the live album At Carnegie Hall! recorded in December. Josh Graves took a "leave of absence" during early 1963, with Kenny Haddock taking his place for live shows and one recording session. Powers had left by the spring of 1964, with recordings that summer featuring Monroe Fields on mandolin and baritone vocals. From December onwards, they were augmented by session harmonica player Charlie McCoy. Session guitarist Grady Martin also joined the recording unit starting with the tracking of Town and Country from September 1965.

In late 1965, the band added multi-instrumentalist Earl Taylor on mandolin and harmonica. He performed at four recording sessions and remained until the summer of 1966, contributing to the album When the Saints Go Marching In released shortly after his departure. McCoy subsequently returned to recording sessions later in 1966, when the band recorded Strictly Instrumental with guitarist Doc Watson. At the beginning of 1967, Howard "Johnny" Johnson joined on second guitar, contributing to the band's next album Hear the Whistles Blow. The official FMB lineup remained stable for the next two years, although the band continued working with a range of session contributors for their next two albums The Story of Bonnie & Clyde and Nashville Airplane, including Scruggs' sons Gary and Randy, guitarist Charlie Daniels, bassist Henry Strzelecki and drummer Kenny Buttrey.

After growing tensions and increasing musical differences, Flatt and Scruggs officially ended their musical partnership on March 11, 1969, with Flatt going on to form Nashville Grass and Scruggs turning his attention to the Earl Scruggs Revue. The pair later recorded a final album, Final Fling: One Last Time, in August 1969 with Johnson, Randy Scruggs and Daniels on guitars, Paul Warren on fiddle, Strzelecki and Bobby Dyson on bass, Buttrey and Jerry Carrigan on drums, and McCoy on harmonica. Lester Flatt died of heart failure on May 11, 1979; Earl Scruggs died of natural causes on March 28, 2012. Both were inducted into the Country Music Hall of Fame in 1985 (as a pair), the International Bluegrass Music Hall of Fame in 1991 (its inaugural year), and the Nashville Songwriters Hall of Fame in 2007.

== Members ==
=== Official ===
Image	Name	Years active	Instruments	Release contributions
	Lester Flatt (1914–1979)	1948–1969	guitar; lead and occasional tenor vocals	all Lester Flatt, Earl Scruggs and the Foggy Mountain Boys releases
	Earl Scruggs (1924–2012)	1948–1969	banjo; guitar; baritone and occasional lead vocals	all Lester Flatt, Earl Scruggs and the Foggy Mountain Boys releases
	Howard Watts (aka. Cedric Rainwater) (1913–1970)	1948–1950; 1952–1953; 1957 (session)	string bass; bass and occasional baritone vocals	all releases from "God Loves His Children" (1949)^{A&B} to "My Little Girl in Tennessee" (1950)^{A&B}; "Flint Hill Special" (1952)^{A&B}; "Why Did You Wander?" (1953)^{A&B}; "If I Should Wander Back Tonight" (1953)^{A&B}; "Six White Horses" (1957)^{A&B}
	Homer "Jim" Eanes (1923–1995)	1948	guitar; tenor vocals	none
	Jim Shumate (1921–2013)	1948–1949	fiddle; bass vocals	"God Loves His Children" (1949)^{A&B}; "We'll Meet Again Sweetheart" (1949)^{A&B}
	Mac Wiseman	1948	guitar; tenor vocals	"God Loves His Children" (1949)^{A&B}; "We'll Meet Again Sweetheart" (1949)^{A&B}
	Art Wooten (1906–1986)	1949; 1951–1952	fiddle	"Baby Blue Eyes" (1949)^{A&B}; "Down the Road" (1949)^{A&B}
	John "Curly" Seckler (1919–2017)	1949–1951; 1952–1958; 1959–1962	mandolin; tenor and occasional lead vocals	all releases from "Baby Blue Eyes" (1949)^{A&B} to "Doin' My Time" (1951)^{A&B}; "Roll in My Sweet Baby's Arms" (1951)^{A&B}; "Pike County Breakdown" (1952)^{A&B}; "The Old Home Town" (1952)^{A&B}; "Preachin', Prayin', Singin'" (1952)^{A&B}; "Flint Hill Special" (1952)^{A&B}; "Back to the Cross" (1952) (Note: "Back to the Cross" was released as the B-side to a re-release of "God Loves His Children".); "Why Did You Wander?" (1953)^{A&B}; "If I Should Wander Back Tonight" (1953)^{A&B}; all releases from "I'll Go Stepping Too" (1953)^{A&B} to "A Million Years in Glory" (1959)^{A&B}, and from Songs of Glory (1960) to "The Ballad of Jed Clampett" (1962)^{B only}; When the Saints Go Marching In (1966); Breaking Out (1970); Blue Ridge Cabin Home (1978)
	Benny Sims (1924–1995)	1949–1951	fiddle; bass vocals	all releases from "I'll Never Shed Another Tear" (1950)^{A&B} to "Doin' My Time" (1951)^{A&B}; "Roll in My Sweet Baby's Arms" (1951)^{A&B}; "Pike County Breakdown" (1952)^{A&B}; "The Old Home Town" (1952)^{A&B}; "Preachin', Prayin', Singin'" (1952)^{A&B}; "Back to the Cross" (1952)
	Jody Rainwater (real name Chuck Johnson) (1920–2011)	1950–1952	string bass; mandolin; bass vocals	all releases from "Cora Is Gone" (1951) (Note: "Cora Is Gone" was released as the B-side to "That Little Old Country Church House" by the Masters Family.) to "I'm Gonna Settle Down" (1952)^{A&B}; "Back to the Cross" (1952); "I'm Working on a Road" (1953)^{A&B}
	Robert "Chubby" Wise (1915–1996)	1950–1951; 1954 (session)	fiddle	"Jimmie Brown, the Newsboy" (1951)^{A&B}; "Don't Get Above Your Raisin'" (1951)^{A&B}; "I'm Working on a Road" (1953)^{A&B}; "You're Not a Drop in the Bucket" (1954)^{A&B}; "Till the End of the World Rolls Around" (1954)^{A&B}
	Everett Lilly (1924–2012)	1951–1952; 1958	mandolin; fiddle; tenor and baritone vocals	"Jimmie Brown, the Newsboy" (1951)^{A&B}; "Don't Get Above Your Raisin'" (1951)^{A&B}; "'Tis Sweet to Be Remembered" (1951)^{A&B}; "Get in Line Brother" (1952)^{A&B}; "Over the Hills to the Poorhouse" (1952)^{A&B}; "I'm Gonna Settle Down" (1952)^{A&B}; "I'm Working on a Road" (1953)^{A&B}
	Benny Martin (1928–2001)	1952–1954	fiddle; bass vocals	"Flint Hill Special" (1952)^{A&B}; "Why Did You Wander?" (1953)^{A&B}; "If I Should Wander Back Tonight" (1953)^{A&B}; "I'll Go Stepping Too" (1953)^{A&B}; "Mother Prays Loud in Her Sleep" (1954)^{A&B}; "I'd Rather Be Alone" (1954)^{A&B}; Foggy Mountain Jamboree (1957); Breaking Out (1970)
	Charles Elza (aka. Kentucky Slim) (1912–1996)	1952; 1955–1956	bass; bass vocals	none
	Paul Warren (1918–1978)	1954–1969	fiddle; bass vocals	all releases from "You're Not a Drop in the Bucket" (1954)^{A&B} onwards
	Joe Stuart (1928–1987)	1954; 1955 (stand-in)	string bass	none
	English "Jake" Tullock (1922–1988)	1954–1955; 1958–1969	string bass; guitar; baritone and tenor vocals	"You're Not a Drop in the Bucket" (1954)^{A&B}; "Till the End of the World Rolls Around" (1954)^{A&B}; "You Can Feel It in Your Soul" (1955)^{A&B}; "Before I Met You" (1955)^{A&B}; "Heaven" (1958)^{A&B}; all releases from "A Million Years in Glory" (1959)^{A&B} onwards
	Burkett "Josh" Graves (aka. Buck Graves) (1927–2006)	1955–1969	dobro; string bass; tenor and occasional lead vocals	all releases from "Gone Home" (1955)^{A&B} onwards
	Onie Wheeler (1921–1984)	1956–1957 (Note: It is unknown if Wheeler remained bassist until early 1957. For the band's sessions in January and March, bass was performed by Howard Watts and Junior Huskey, respectively, who were considered session musicians.)	string bass	"Joy Bells" (1956)^{A&B}; "What's Good for You" (1956)^{A&B}; When the Saints Go Marching In (1966)
	Frank "Hylo" Brown (1922–2003)	1957–1958; 1959	string bass; guitar; tenor, baritone and occasional lead vocals	"Don't Let Your Deal Go Down" (1957)^{B only}; "A Hundred Years from Now" (1957)^{B only}; "Cabin on the Hill" (1959)^{A&B}; "Crying My Heart Out Over You" (1959)^{B only}; Blue Ridge Cabin Home (1978)
	Richard "Curley" Lambert (1930–1982)	1958–1959	mandolin; guitar; tenor vocals	"Cabin on the Hill" (1959)^{A&B}; "Crying My Heart Out Over You" (1959)^{A&B}; Foggy Mountain Banjo (1961); Breaking Out (1970)
	Billy Powers (1925–1993)	1962–1964	guitar; tenor vocals	all releases from "Pearl, Pearl, Pearl" (1963)^{A only} to The Fabulous Sound of Lester Flatt & Earl Scruggs (1964), except "Workin' It Out" (1964); Breaking Out (1970)
	Earl Taylor (1929–1984)	1965–1966	mandolin; harmonica	"Green Acres" (1966)^{A&B}; When the Saints Go Marching In (1966); "The Last Thing on My Mind" (1966)^{A&B}
	Howard "Johnny" Johnson (1935–1974)	1967–1969	guitar; bass vocals	"Nashville Cats" (1967)^{A&B}; "California Up Tight Band" (1967)^{A&B}; Hear the Whistles Blow (1967); The Story of Bonnie & Clyde (1968); Nashville Airplane (1968); Final Fling: One Last Time (1969)

=== Stand-in ===
Image	Name	Years active	Instruments	Details
	Lonnie "Red" Murphy	1953	string bass	Murphy was an unconfirmed stand-in bassist after the second departure of Howard Watts in early 1953.
	Roy "Junior" Huskey (1928–1971)	1953	string bass	Huskey also filled in on bass after Watts' 1953 departure, including at WSM shows in early June.
	Bob Moore (1932–2021)	1953–1954 (Note: It is unknown if Moore remained bassist until early 1954, but he was the last stand-in named before Joe Stuart's arrival.)	string bass	Moore followed Murphy and Huskey, as well as playing at the band's August 1953 recording sessions.
	Benny Williams (1931–2007)	1955	string bass	Williams and Jenkins (and Joe Stuart) filled in after the departure of Jake Tullock in the spring of 1955.
	Harry "Hoke" Jenkins (1917–1967)	1955	string bass	Williams and Jenkins (and Joe Stuart) filled in after the departure of Jake Tullock in the spring of 1955.
	Curtis McPeake (1927–2021)	1955/1956 (Note: It is not known which specific dates featured either McPeake, Bryant or McCormick on banjo, but Scruggs was out of action between October 1955 and spring 1956.)	banjo	McPeake, Bryant and McCormick all filled in for Earl Scruggs after he was injured in October 1955. McPeake and Bryant were the primary touring stand-ins, while McCormick performed at the Grand Ole Opry and local shows.
	Donnie Bryant	1955/1956	banjo	McPeake, Bryant and McCormick all filled in for Earl Scruggs after he was injured in October 1955. McPeake and Bryant were the primary touring stand-ins, while McCormick performed at the Grand Ole Opry and local shows.
	Haskel McCormick	1955/1956	banjo	McPeake, Bryant and McCormick all filled in for Earl Scruggs after he was injured in October 1955. McPeake and Bryant were the primary touring stand-ins, while McCormick performed at the Grand Ole Opry and local shows.
	Kenny Haddock (1935–2010)	1963	dobro	Haddock briefly filled in for Josh Graves during early 1953 when he took a "leave of absence".

=== Session ===
Image	Name	Years active	Instruments	Release contributions
	Howdy Forrester (1922–1987)	1951	fiddle	"'Tis Sweet to Be Remembered" (1951)^{A&B}; "Get in Line Brother" (1952)^{A&B}; "Over the Hills to the Poorhouse" (1952)^{A&B}; "I'm Gonna Settle Down" (1952)^{A&B}
	Louis Innis (1919–1982)	1953–1954	guitar	"I'll Go Stepping Too" (1953)^{A&B}; "Mother Prays Loud in Her Sleep" (1954)^{A&B}; "I'd Rather Be Alone" (1954)^{A&B}; "You're Not a Drop in the Bucket" (1954)^{A&B}; "Till the End of the World Rolls Around" (1954)^{A&B}; Foggy Mountain Jamboree (1957); Breaking Out (1970)
	Eddie Hill (1921–1994)	1955	guitar	"You Can Feel It in Your Soul" (1955)^{A&B}; "Before I Met You" (1955)^{A&B}
	Ernie Newton (1908–1976)	1955; 1966	string bass	"Randy Lynn Rag" (1956)^{A&B}; Foggy Mountain Jamboree (1957); "The Last Thing on My Mind" (1966)^{A&B}
	Loren "Jack" Shook (1910–1986)	1955	guitar	"Randy Lynn Rag" (1956)^{A&B}; Foggy Mountain Jamboree (1957)
	Bob Moore (1932–2021)	1955; 1966	string bass	"I'll Go Stepping Too" (1953)^{A&B}; "Mother Prays Loud in Her Sleep" (1954)^{A&B}; "I'd Rather Be Alone" (1954)^{A&B}; "Gone Home" (1955)^{A&B}; Foggy Mountain Jamboree (1957); "It Was Only the Wind" (1967)^{B only}; "California Up Tight Band" (1967)^{A&B}; Nashville Airplane (1968); Breaking Out (1970); Blue Ridge Cabin Home (1978)
	Chet Atkins (1924–2001)	1955	guitar	"Gone Home" (1955)^{A&B}; Foggy Mountain Jamboree (1957); Blue Ridge Cabin Home (1978)
	Harold Bradley (1926–2019)	1956	guitar	"Joy Bells" (1956)^{A&B}; "What's Good for You" (1956)^{A&B}; When the Saints Go Marching In (1966)
	Ray Edenton (1926–2022)	1957	guitar	"Six White Horses" (1957)^{A&B}
	Roy "Junior" Huskey (1928–1971)	1957; 1965–1966; 1967	string bass	"Give Me Flowers While I'm Living" (1957)^{A&B}|"Don't Let Your Deal Go Down" (1957)^{A only}|"A Hundred Years from Now" (1957)^{A only}|"Green Acres" (1966)^{A&B}|When the Saints Go Marching In (1966)|"Nashville Cats" (1967)^{A&B}|Hear the Whistles Blow (1967)
	Ike Inman	1958	string bass	"Big Black Train" (1958)^{A&B}; "I Don't Care Anymore" (1958)^{A&B}
	Joe Zinkan (1918–2003)	1959; 1965	string bass	"Cabin on the Hill" (1959)^{A&B}; "Crying My Heart Out Over You" (1959)^{B only}; Songs of Glory (1960); "Memphis" (1965)^{B only}; Town and Country (1966); "Colours" (1966)^{B only}
	Culley Holt (1925–1980)	1959	guitar; bass vocals	"Cabin on the Hill" (1959)^{A&B}; "Crying My Heart Out Over You" (1959)^{B only}; Songs of Glory (1960)
	Murrey "Buddy" Harman (1928–2008)	1960; 1961; 1962; 1963; 1964; 1965–1967	drums	"The Great Historical Bum" (1960)^{A&B}; "Polka on a Banjo" (1960)^{A&B}; Foggy Mountain Banjo (1961); "Where Will I Shelter My Sheep" (1961)^{A&B}; "Cold, Cold Loving" (1962)^{B only}; "The Ballad of Jed Clampett" (1962)^{A only}; Hard Travelin' (1963); "Pearl, Pearl, Pearl" (1963)^{A&B}; "New York Town" (1963)^{B only}; "Petticoat Junction" (1964)^{A&B}; "Green Acres" (1966)^{A&B}; When the Saints Go Marching In (1966); "The Last Thing on My Mind" (1966)^{A&B}; "It Was Only the Wind" (1967)^{A&B}; Strictly Instrumental (1967); Hear the Whistles Blow (1967)
	Doug Kirkham (died 1986)	1961	drums	"I Ain't Gonna Work Tomorrow" (1961)^{A&B}; "Cold, Cold Loving" (1962)^{A only}
	Maybelle Carter (1909–1978)	1961	autoharp; guitar	Songs of the Famous Carter Family (1961)
	John Greubel (1934–2019)	1962	drums	"Hear the Whistle Blow" (1962)^{B only}; Folk Songs of Our Land (1962)
	Willie Ackerman (1939–2012)	1962; 1968	drums	Hard Travelin' (1963); "New York Town" (1963)^{A only}; The Story of Bonnie & Clyde (1968)
	Monroe Fields (1928–2015)	1964	mandolin; baritone vocals	"Workin' It Out" (1964)^{A&B}; "Little Birdie" (1964)^{B only}; The Fabulous Sound of Lester Flatt & Earl Scruggs (1964); "I Still Miss Someone" (1965)^{B only}
	Charlie McCoy	1964–1965; 1966–1967; 1969	harmonica	all releases from "I Still Miss Someone" (1965)^{A only} to Changin' Times (1968) except "The Last Thing on My Mind" (1966); Final Fling: One Last Time (1969)
	Grady Martin (1929–2001)	1965–1967	guitar	all releases from "Memphis" (1965)^{A&B} to Hear the Whistles Blow (1967)
	June Carter (1929–2003)	1965	tenor vocals	"Green Acres" (1964)^{B only}; When the Saints Go Marching In (1966)
	Floyd "Lightnin'" Chance (1925–2005)	1966	string bass	"It Was Only the Wind" (1967)^{A only}
	Gary Scruggs (1949–2021)	1967–1968	guitar; baritone vocals	"California Up Tight Band" (1967)^{A&B}; "Down in the Flood" (1967)^{A&B}; Changin' Times (1968); The Story of Bonnie & Clyde (1968); Nashville Airplane (1968)
	Randy Scruggs (1953–2018)	1967–1969	guitar	"Down in the Flood" (1967)^{A&B}; Changin' Times (1968); The Story of Bonnie & Clyde (1968); Nashville Airplane (1968); Final Fling: One Last Time (1969)
	Kenny Buttrey (1945–2004)	1967; 1968–1969	drums	"Down in the Flood" (1967)^{A&B}; Changin' Times (1968); Nashville Airplane (1968); Final Fling: One Last Time (1969)
	Charlie Daniels (1936–2020)	1968–1969	guitar	Nashville Airplane (1968); Final Fling: One Last Time (1969)
	Henry Strzelecki (1939–2014)	1968–1969	string bass	Nashville Airplane (1968); Final Fling: One Last Time (1969)
	Jerry Shook	1968	guitar	Nashville Airplane (1968)
	Norbert Putnam	1968	string bass	Nashville Airplane (1968)
	Boomer Clarke (real name Owens Castleman)	1968	tenor vocals	Nashville Airplane (1968)
	Bobby Dyson	1969	electric bass	Final Fling: One Last Time (1969)
	Jerry Carrigan (1943–2019)	1969	drums	Final Fling: One Last Time (1969)

== Lineups ==
Period	Members	Recordings
March 1948	Lester Flatt — guitar, lead vocals; Jim Eanes — guitar, tenor vocals; Earl Scruggs — banjo, baritone vocals; Howard Watts — string bass, bass vocals	none
March–April 1948	Lester Flatt — lead guitar, lead vocals; Earl Scruggs — banjo, baritone vocals; Jim Shumate — fiddle, bass vocals; Howard Watts — string bass, tenor vocals	none
April–December 1948	Lester Flatt — lead guitar, lead vocals; Earl Scruggs — banjo, baritone vocals; Mac Wiseman — guitar, tenor vocals; Jim Shumate — fiddle, bass vocals; Howard Watts — string bass, bass vocals	"God Loves His Children" (1949)^{A&B}; "We'll Meet Again Sweetheart" (1949)^{A&B}
December 1948–January 1949	Lester Flatt — lead guitar, lead vocals; Earl Scruggs — banjo, baritone vocals; Jim Shumate — fiddle, bass vocals; Howard Watts — string bass, bass vocals	none
January–March 1949	Lester Flatt — lead guitar, lead vocals; Earl Scruggs — banjo, baritone vocals; Art Wooten — fiddle; Howard Watts — string bass, bass vocals	none
March–September 1949	Lester Flatt — lead guitar, lead vocals; Earl Scruggs — banjo, baritone vocals; Curly Seckler — mandolin, tenor vocals; Art Wooten — fiddle; Howard Watts — string bass, bass vocals	"Baby Blue Eyes" (1949)^{A&B}; "Down the Road" (1949)^{A&B}
September 1949–May 1950	Lester Flatt — lead guitar, lead vocals; Earl Scruggs — banjo, baritone vocals; Curly Seckler — mandolin, tenor vocals; Benny Sims — fiddle; Howard Watts — string bass, bass vocals	"I'll Never Shed Another Tear" (1950)^{A&B}; "No Mother or Dad" (1950)^{A&B}; "Is It Too Late Now" (1950)^{A&B}; "My Little Girl in Tennessee" (1950)^{A&B}
May–December 1950	Lester Flatt — lead guitar, lead vocals; Earl Scruggs — banjo, baritone vocals; Curly Seckler — mandolin, tenor vocals; Benny Sims — fiddle, bass vocals; Jody Rainwater — string bass, bass vocals	"Cora Is Gone" (1951); "Come Back Darling" (1951)^{A&B}; "Pain in My Heart" (1951)^{A&B}; "I'm Head Over Heels in Love" (1951)^{A&B}; "Doin' My Time" (1951)^{A&B}; "Roll in My Sweet Baby's Arms" (1951)^{A&B}; "Pike County Breakdown" (1952)^{A&B}; "The Old Home Town" (1952)^{A&B}; "Preachin', Prayin', Singin'" (1952)^{A&B}; "Back to the Cross" (1952)
December 1950–March 1951	Lester Flatt — lead guitar, lead vocals; Earl Scruggs — banjo, baritone vocals; Curly Seckler — mandolin, tenor vocals; Chubby Wise — fiddle; Jody Rainwater — string bass, bass vocals	none
March–September 1951	Lester Flatt — lead guitar, lead vocals; Earl Scruggs — banjo, baritone vocals; Everett Lilly — mandolin, tenor vocals; Chubby Wise — fiddle; Jody Rainwater — string bass, bass vocals	"Jimmie Brown, the Newsboy" (1951)^{A&B}; "Don't Get Above Your Raisin'" (1951)^{A&B}; "I'm Working on a Road" (1953)^{A&B}
September 1951–January 1952	Lester Flatt — lead guitar, lead vocals; Earl Scruggs — banjo, baritone vocals; Everett Lilly — mandolin, tenor vocals; Art Wooten — fiddle (Note: Wooten did not perform at the band's October 1951 session, with Howdy Forrester taking his place for the recording.); Jody Rainwater — string bass, bass vocals	"'Tis Sweet to Be Remembered" (1951)^{A&B}; "Get in Line Brother" (1952)^{A&B}; "Over the Hills to the Poorhouse" (1952)^{A&B}; "I'm Gonna Settle Down" (1952)^{A&B}
January–June 1952	Lester Flatt — lead guitar, lead vocals; Earl Scruggs — banjo, baritone vocals; Everett Lilly — mandolin, tenor vocals; Benny Martin — fiddle, bass vocals; Jody Rainwater — string bass, bass vocals	none
June–September 1952	Lester Flatt — lead guitar, lead vocals; Earl Scruggs — banjo, baritone vocals; Everett Lilly — mandolin, tenor vocals; Benny Martin — fiddle, bass vocals; Charles Elza — string bass, bass vocals	none
September–October 1952	Lester Flatt — lead guitar, lead vocals; Earl Scruggs — banjo, baritone vocals; Curly Seckler — mandolin, tenor vocals; Benny Martin — fiddle, bass vocals; Charles Elza — string bass, bass vocals	none
October 1952–spring 1953	Lester Flatt — lead guitar, lead vocals; Earl Scruggs — banjo, baritone vocals; Curly Seckler — mandolin, tenor vocals; Benny Martin — fiddle, bass vocals; Howard Watts — string bass, bass vocals	"Flint Hill Special" (1952)^{A&B}; "Why Did You Wander?" (1953)^{A&B}; "If I Should Wander Back Tonight" (1953)^{A&B}
Spring 1953–early 1954	Lester Flatt — lead guitar, lead vocals; Earl Scruggs — banjo, baritone vocals; Curly Seckler — mandolin, tenor vocals; Benny Martin — fiddle, bass vocals; Red Murphy — string bass (stand-in, spring) (Note: Murphy's involvement with the band is unconfirmed; writer Penny Parsons claims that he "may have worked with them briefly".); Junior Huskey — string bass (stand-in, summer); Bob Moore — string bass (stand-in, from summer); Louis Innis — guitar (session, August 1953/May 1954)	"I'll Go Stepping Too" (1953)^{A&B}; "Mother Prays Loud in Her Sleep" (1954)^{A&B}; "I'd Rather Be Alone" (1954)^{A&B}; Foggy Mountain Jamboree (1957)^{1 song}; Breaking Out (1970)^{1 song}
February–May 1954	Lester Flatt — lead guitar, lead vocals; Earl Scruggs — banjo, baritone vocals; Curly Seckler — mandolin, tenor vocals; Paul Warren — fiddle, bass vocals; Joe Stuart — string bass	none
May 1954–March 1955	Lester Flatt — lead guitar, lead vocals; Earl Scruggs — banjo, baritone vocals; Curly Seckler — mandolin, tenor vocals; Paul Warren — fiddle, bass vocals; Jake Tullock — string bass, baritone vocals; Louis Innis — guitar (session, May 1954); Chubby Wise — fiddle (session, May 1954); Eddie Hill — guitar (session, January 1955)	"You're Not a Drop in the Bucket" (1954)^{A&B}; "Till the End of the World Rolls Around" (1954)^{A&B}; "You Can Feel It in Your Soul" (1955)^{A&B}; "Before I Met You" (1955)^{A&B}
March–May 1955	Lester Flatt — lead guitar, lead vocals; Earl Scruggs — banjo, baritone vocals; Curly Seckler — mandolin, tenor vocals; Paul Warren — fiddle, bass vocals; Benny Williams — string bass (stand-in); Hoke Jenkins — string bass (stand-in); Joe Stuart — string bass (stand-in)	none
May 1955	Lester Flatt — lead guitar, lead vocals; Earl Scruggs — banjo, baritone vocals; Curly Seckler — mandolin, tenor vocals; Paul Warren — fiddle, bass vocals; Josh Graves — string bass	none
June–October 1955	Lester Flatt — lead guitar, lead vocals; Earl Scruggs — banjo, baritone vocals; Curly Seckler — mandolin, tenor vocals; Josh Graves — dobro; Paul Warren — fiddle, bass vocals; Charles Elza — string bass (Note: Elza did not perform at the band's September 1955 sessions, with Ernie Newton (September 2) and Bob Moore (September 3) taking his place for the recordings.); Jack Shook — guitar (session, September 2, 1955); Chet Atkins — guitar (session, September 3, 1955)	"Gone Home" (1955)^{A&B}; "Randy Lynn Rag" (1956)^{A&B}; Foggy Mountain Jamboree (1957)^{3 songs}; Blue Ridge Cabin Home (1978)^{1 song}
October 1955–spring 1956	Lester Flatt — lead guitar, lead vocals; Curly Seckler — mandolin, tenor vocals; Josh Graves — dobro; Paul Warren — fiddle, bass vocals; Charles Elza — string bass; Curtis McPeake — banjo (stand-in); Donnie Bryant — banjo (stand-in); Haskel McCormick — banjo (stand-in)	none
Spring 1956–spring 1957	Lester Flatt — lead guitar, lead vocals; Earl Scruggs — banjo, baritone vocals; Curly Seckler — mandolin, tenor vocals; Josh Graves — dobro; Paul Warren — fiddle, bass vocals; Onie Wheeler — string bass; Harold Bradley — guitar (session, May 1956); Ray Edenton — guitar (session, January 1957)	"Joy Bells" (1956)^{A&B}; "What's Good for You" (1956)^{A&B}; "Six White Horses" (1957)^{A&B}; "Give Me Flowers While I'm Living" (1957)^{A&B}; "Don't Let Your Deal Go Down" (1957)^{A only}; "A Hundred Years from Now" (1957)^{A only}; When the Saints Go Marching In (1966)^{1 song}; 1948–1959 (1991)^{comp}
Spring 1957–early 1958	Lester Flatt — lead guitar, lead vocals; Earl Scruggs — banjo, baritone vocals; Curly Seckler — mandolin, tenor vocals; Josh Graves — dobro; Paul Warren — fiddle, bass vocals; Hylo Brown — string bass, baritone vocals (Note: Brown did not perform at the band's January 1958 session, with Ike Inman taking his place for the recording.)	"Let Those Brown Eyes Smile at Me" (1957)^{B-side}; "I Won't Be Hangin' Around" (1957)^{B-side}; "Big Black Train" (1958)^{A&B}; "I Don't Care Anymore" (1958)^{A&B}; Blue Ridge Cabin Home (1978)^{2 songs}
Early–May 1958	Lester Flatt — lead guitar, lead vocals; Earl Scruggs — banjo, baritone vocals; Curly Seckler — mandolin, tenor vocals; Josh Graves — dobro; Paul Warren — fiddle, bass vocals; Jake Tullock — string bass, baritone vocals	"Heaven" (1958)^{A&B}; "A Million Years in Glory" (1959)^{A&B}
May–December 1958	Lester Flatt — lead guitar, lead vocals; Earl Scruggs — banjo, baritone vocals; Everett Lilly — mandolin, tenor vocals; Josh Graves — dobro; Paul Warren — fiddle, bass vocals; Jake Tullock — string bass, baritone vocals	none
December 1958–March 1959	Lester Flatt — lead guitar, lead vocals; Earl Scruggs — banjo, baritone vocals; Curley Lambert — mandolin, tenor vocals; Josh Graves — dobro; Paul Warren — fiddle, bass vocals; Jake Tullock — string bass, baritone vocals	"Crying My Heart Out Over You" (1959)^{A only}; Foggy Mountain Banjo (1961)^{1 song}; Breaking Out (1970)^{1 song}; Columbia Historic Edition (1989)^{comp}
March–May 1959	Lester Flatt — lead guitar, lead vocals; Earl Scruggs — banjo, baritone vocals; Jake Tullock — guitar, baritone vocals; Curley Lambert — mandolin, tenor vocals; Josh Graves — dobro; Paul Warren — fiddle, bass vocals; Hylo Brown — string bass, baritone vocals; Joe Zinkan — string bass (session, April 1959); Culley Holt — bass vocals (session, April 1959)	"Cabin on the Hill" (1959)^{A&B}; "Foggy Mountain Rock" (1959)^{B-side}; Columbia Historic Edition (1989)^{comp}
May 1959–March 1962	Lester Flatt — lead guitar, lead vocals; Earl Scruggs — banjo, baritone vocals; Curly Seckler — mandolin, tenor vocals; Josh Graves — dobro; Paul Warren — fiddle, bass vocals; Jake Tullock — string bass, baritone vocals; Joe Zinkan — string bass (session, August 1959); Culley Holt — bass vocals (session, August 1959); Buddy Harman — drums (session, 1960/May 1961); Doug Kirkham — drums (session, February 3, 1961); Maybelle Carter — guitar (session, February 10, 1961); John Greubel — drums (session, March 1962)	Songs of Glory (1960); "The Great Historical Bum" (1960)^{A&B}; "Polka on a Banjo" (1960)^{A&B}; Foggy Mountain Banjo (1961); "I Ain't Gonna Work Tomorrow" (1961)^{A&B}; Songs of the Famous Carter Family (1961); "Where Will I Shelter My Sheep" (1961)^{A&B}; "Cold, Cold Loving" (1962)^{A&B}; "Hear the Whistle Blow" (1962)^{A&B}; Folk Songs of Our Land (1962); "Coal Loadin' Johnny" (1962)^{B-side}; When the Saints Go Marching In (1966)^{1 song}; Breaking Out (1970)^{1 song}; Country & Western Classics (1982)^{comp}; Singles Collection Vol. 1 (1988)^{comp}
March–late 1962	Lester Flatt — lead guitar, lead vocals; Earl Scruggs — banjo, baritone vocals; Josh Graves — dobro, tenor vocals; Paul Warren — fiddle, bass vocals; Jake Tullock — string bass, baritone vocals; Buddy Harman — drums (session, September 1962); Willie Ackerman — drums (session, October 1962)	"The Ballad of Jed Clampett" (1962)^{A only}; Hard Travelin' (1963); "New York Town" (1963)^{A only}
Late 1962–early 1963	Lester Flatt — lead guitar, lead vocals; Earl Scruggs — banjo, baritone vocals; Billy Powers — guitar, tenor vocals; Josh Graves — dobro, tenor vocals; Paul Warren — fiddle, bass vocals; Jake Tullock — string bass, baritone vocals	At Carnegie Hall! (1963)
Early–spring 1963	Lester Flatt — lead guitar, lead vocals; Earl Scruggs — banjo, baritone vocals; Billy Powers — guitar, tenor vocals; Paul Warren — fiddle, bass vocals; Jake Tullock — string bass, baritone vocals; Kenny Haddock — dobro (stand-in); Buddy Harman — drums (session, February 1963)	"Pearl, Pearl, Pearl" (1963)^{A only}; "Mama Don't Allow It" (1963)^{B-side}; Breaking Out (1970)^{1 song}; Singles Collection Vol. 1 (1988)^{comp}
Spring 1963–spring 1964	Lester Flatt — lead guitar, lead vocals; Earl Scruggs — banjo, baritone vocals; Billy Powers — guitar, tenor vocals; Josh Graves — dobro, tenor vocals; Paul Warren — fiddle, bass vocals; Jake Tullock — string bass, baritone vocals; Buddy Harman — drums (session, January 1964)	"My Saro Jane" (1964)^{A&B}; "Petticoat Junction" (1964)^{A&B}; Recorded Live at Vanderbilt University (1964); "Little Birdie" (1964)^{A only}; The Fabulous Sound of... (1964)^{1 song}; Breaking Out (1970)^{1 song}; 1959–1963 (1992)^{comp}
Spring 1964–late 1965	Lester Flatt — lead guitar, lead vocals; Earl Scruggs — banjo, baritone vocals; Josh Graves — dobro, tenor vocals; Paul Warren — fiddle, bass vocals; Jake Tullock — string bass, baritone vocals; Monroe Fields — mandolin (session, June/July 1964); Charlie McCoy — harmonica (session, from Dec. 1964); Grady Martin — guitar (session, Sep./Oct. 1965)	"Workin' It Out" (1964)^{A&B}; "Sally Don't You Grieve" (1964)^{B-side}; The Fabulous Sound of... (1964); "I Still Miss Someone" (1965)^{A&B}; "Gonna Have Myself a Ball" (1965)^{A&B}; Pickin', Strummin' and Singin' (1965); "Memphis" (1965)^{A&B}; Town and Country (1966); "Colours" (1966)^{A&B}; 1964–1969, Plus (1995)^{comp}
Late 1965–summer 1966	Lester Flatt — lead guitar, lead vocals; Earl Scruggs — banjo, baritone vocals; Earl Taylor — mandolin, harmonica; Josh Graves — dobro, tenor vocals; Paul Warren — fiddle, bass vocals; Jake Tullock — string bass, baritone vocals; Grady Martin — guitar (session, all dates); Buddy Harman — drums (session, all dates); Junior Huskey — bass (session, Dec. 1965/Mar. 1966); June Carter — tenor vocals (session, December 1965); Ernie Newton — string bass (session, May 1966); Charlie McCoy — harmonica (session, Dec. 1965)	"Green Acres" (1966)^{A&B}; When the Saints Go Marching In (1966); "The Last Thing on My Mind" (1966)^{A&B}; Flatt on Victor Plus More (1999)^{comp}
Summer 1966–January 1967	Lester Flatt — lead guitar, lead vocals; Earl Scruggs — banjo, baritone vocals; Josh Graves — dobro, tenor vocals; Paul Warren — fiddle, bass vocals; Jake Tullock — string bass, baritone vocals; Grady Martin — guitar (session, all dates); Charlie McCoy — harmonica (session, all dates); Buddy Harman — drums (session, all dates); Floyd Chance — string bass (session, August 1966); Bob Moore — string bass (session, September 1966)	"It Was Only the Wind" (1967)^{A&B}; Strictly Instrumental (1967); Flatt on Victor Plus More (1999)^{comp}
January 1967–March 1969	Lester Flatt — lead guitar, lead vocals; Earl Scruggs — banjo, baritone vocals; Johnny Johnson — guitar, bass vocals; Josh Graves — dobro, tenor vocals; Paul Warren — fiddle, bass vocals; Jake Tullock — string bass, baritone vocals; Charlie McCoy — harmonica (session, Feb.–Oct. 1967); Grady Martin — guitar (session, Feb.–May 1967); Buddy Harman — drums (session, Feb.–May 1967); Junior Huskey — string bass (session, Feb./Mar. 1967); Gary Scruggs — guitar (session, from May 1967); Bob Moore — string bass (session, May 1967/summ. 1968); Randy Scruggs — guitar (session, from September 1967); Kenny Buttrey — drums (session, Sep./Oct. 1967/1968); Willie Ackerman — drums (session, February 1968); Charlie Daniels — guitar (session, from July 1968); Jerry Shook — guitar (session, from July 1968); Henry Strzelecki — string bass (session, from July 1968); Norbert Putnam — string bass (session, from July 1968); Boomer Clarke — tenor vocals (session, from July 1968)	"Nashville Cats" (1967)^{A&B}; "California Up Tight Band" (1967)^{A&B}; Hear the Whistles Blow (1967); "Down in the Flood" (1967)^{A&B}; Changin' Times (1968); The Story of Bonnie & Clyde (1968); Nashville Airplane (1968); Flatt on Victor Plus More (1999)^{comp}
August 21 and 22, 1969 (one-off recording lineup)	Lester Flatt — guitar, vocals; Earl Scruggs — banjo; Johnny Johnson — guitar; Paul Warren — fiddle; Randy Scruggs — guitar (session, both dates); Charlie Daniels — guitar (session, both dates); Henry Strzelecki — string bass (session, both dates); Kenny Buttrey — drums (session, August 21); Bobby Dyson — electric bass (session, August 22); Jerry Carrigan — drums (session, August 22); Charlie McCoy — harmonica (session, August 22)	Final Fling: One Last Time (1969)

== Bibliography ==
- Parsons, Penny (May 23, 2016), Foggy Mountain Troubadour: The Life and Music of Curly Seckler, Champaign, Illinois: University of Illinois Press, ISBN 978-0252098291
