= Foggy Mountain Jamboree =

Studio album by Flatt & Scruggs
- Released: October 7, 1957
- Recorded: 9 May 1951 – 2 September 1955
- Genre: Bluegrass, country
- Length: 27:34
- Label: Columbia
- Producer: Don Law

Flatt & Scruggs chronology
Foggy Mountain Jamboree (1957)	Country Music (1958)

Professional ratings
Review scores
Source	Rating
Allmusic	4.5/5 stars

Foggy Mountain Jamboree is an album by Flatt & Scruggs, released by Columbia Records in 1957.

It was re-issued on CD by Columbia Records and Legacy Records in 2005.

It was a 2012 inductee to the Grammy Hall of Fame.

== Track listing ==
1. "Flint Hill Special" (Earl Scruggs) – 2:47
2. "Some Old Day" (Louise Certain, Gladys Stacey) – 2:29
3. "Earl's Breakdown" (Earl Scruggs) – 3:01
4. "Jimmie Brown, the Newsboy" (A.P. Carter) – 2:42
5. "Foggy Mountain Special" (Louise Certain, Gladys Stacey) – 2:03
6. "It Won't Be Long" (Johnny Anderson) – 2:31
7. "Shuckin' The Corn" (Louise Certain, Gladys Stacey, Buck Graves) – 2:02
8. "Blue Ridge Cabin Home" (Louise Certain, Gladys Stacey) – 2:55
9. "Randy Lynn Rag" (Earl Scruggs) – 2:03
10. "Your Love is Like a Flower" (Earl Scruggs, Lester Flatt, Everett Lilly) – 2:53
11. "Foggy Mountain Chimes" (Earl Scruggs) – 2:16
12. "Reunion in Heaven" (Earl Scruggs, Lester Flatt) – 2:53

== Personnel ==
- Lester Flatt – Guitar, vocals
- Earl Scruggs – Banjo, vocals
- Chet Atkins – Guest Artist (Rhythm guitar)
- Ray Edenton – Rhythm guitar
- Howdy Forrester – Guest Artist (Fiddle)
- Josh "Buck" Graves – Dobro
- Louis Innis – Rhythm guitar
- Everett Lilly – Mandolin
- Benny Martin – Guest Artist (Fiddle)
- Ernie Newton – Bass
- Jody Rainwater – Bass
- Curly Seckler – Mandolin, vocals
- Jack Shook – Rhythm Guitar
- Jake Tullock – Bass
- Paul Warren – Fiddle, Vocals
- Howard Watts – Bass
- Chubby Wise – Guest Artist (Fiddle)
