= The Fabulous Sound of Lester Flatt & Earl Scruggs =

Studio album by Flatt and Scruggs
- Released: 1964
- Genre: Country
- Label: Columbia

Flatt and Scruggs chronology
Recorded Live at Vanderbilt University (1964)	The Fabulous Sound of Lester Flatt & Earl Scruggs (1964)	The Versatile Flatt & Scruggs (1965)

The Fabulous Sound of Lester Flatt & Earl Scruggs is a studio album by bluegrass artists Flatt and Scruggs. It was released in 1964 by Columbia Records (catalog number CL 2255).

The album debuted on Billboard magazine's Top Country Albums chart on January 2, 1965, peaked at No. 2, and remained on the chart for a total of 26 weeks.

== Track listing ==
Side A

1. "Hello Stranger" (A.P. Carter) [2:14]
2. "Amber Tresses Tied in Blue" (A.P. Carter) [2:43]
3. "The Good Things (Out-Weigh the Bad)" (Jake Lambert, Josh Graves) [3:25]
4. "Bummin' an Old Freight Train" (Flatt, Scruggs) [2:38]
5. "I'm Walking with Him" (Flatt, Scruggs) [2:11]
6. "The Train that Carried My Girl from Town" (Doc Watson) [2:19]

Side B

1. "My Wandering Boy" (Flatt, Scruggs) [2:35]
2. "Georgia Buck" (Flatt, Scruggs) [2:50]
3. "Father's Table Grace" (Henry, Flatt, Scruggs) [2:21]
4. "When Papa Played The Dobro" (Johnny Cash) [1:59]
5. "Please Don't Wake Me" (Flatt, Scruggs) [3:01]
6. "A Faded Red Ribbon" (Bassham) [2:31]

== Credits ==
The musicians performing on the album are:

- Lester Flatt – guitar, vocals
- Earl Scruggs – banjo, guitar, vocals
- Jody Rainwater – bass, mandolin
- Curly Seckler – mandolin, vocals
- Jim Shumate – fiddle
- Howard Watts – bass
- Mac Wiseman – guitar, vocals
- Art Wooten – fiddle
