= Songs of the Famous Carter Family =

Studio album by Flatt and Scruggs
- Released: 1961
- Genre: Country
- Label: Columbia

Flatt and Scruggs chronology
Songs of Glory (1960)	Songs of the Famous Carter Family (1961)	Folk Songs of Our Land (1962)

Songs of the Famous Carter Family is a studio album by bluegrass artists Flatt and Scruggs featuring Mother Maybelle Carter and the Foggy Mountain Boys. It was released in 1961 by Columbia Records, catalog numbers CL 1664 (mono) and CS 8464 (stereo).

The album was released before Billboard magazine began maintaining its Top Country Albums chart in 1964. It was part of Louise Scruggs' plan to give the group a facelift by adding older folk songs to their repertoire.

AllMusic gave the album a rating of three stars. Critic Jim Smith wrote that Flatt and Scruggs "cool[ed] their famous 'overdrive' to turn in a collection of relaxed, almost dreamy adaptations of Carter tunes."

== Track listing ==
Side A

1. "Keep on the Sunny Side" (A.P. Carter) [3:05]
2. "Foggy Mountain Top" (A.P. Carter) 2:24]
3. "False-Hearted Lover" (A.P. Carter, Flatt, Scruggs) [2:20]
4. "Jimmy Brown the Newsboy" (A.P. Carter) [2:32]
5. "You Are My Flower" (A.P. Carter) [2:42]
6. "On the Rock Where Moses Stood" (A.P. Carter) [2:25]

Side B

1. "Forsaken Love" (A.P. Carter) [2:24]
2. "The Homestead on the Farm" (A.P. Carter) [2:08]
3. "Pickin' in the Wildwood" (A.P. Carter, Flatt, Scruggs) [2:15]
4. "Worried Man Blues" (A.P. Carter) [2:00]
5. "The Storms Are on the Ocean" (A.P. Carter) [2:44]
6. "Gathering Flowers from the Hillside" (A.P. Carter) [2:10]

== Credits ==
- Lester Flatt - guitar, solo vocal
- Earl Scruggs - banjo
- Maybelle Carter - autoharp (and guitar on "You Are My Flower")
- Burkett Graves - dobro
