= Strictly Instrumental (Doc Watson, Lester Flatt and Earl Scruggs album) =

Studio album by Doc Watson, Lester Flatt and Earl Scruggs
- Released: 1967
- Recorded: December 12, 1966
- Genre: Folk, bluegrass
- Length: 23:43
- Label: Columbia
- Producer: Don Law, Frank Jones

Doc Watson chronology
Ballads from Deep Gap (1967)	Strictly Instrumental (1967)	Old-Timey Concert (1967)

Strictly Instrumental is the title of a recording by American folk music artists Doc Watson, Lester Flatt and Earl Scruggs, released in 1967.

== Reception ==
Professional ratings
Review scores
Source	Rating
Allmusic	4/5 stars

Writing for Allmusic, music critic Thom Owen wrote the album "Flatt & Scruggs and Watson play with a startling fluidity — these instrumentals are so rich and skillful that vocals would have been superfluous. For lovers of instrumental bluegrass, this album is a must-hear."

== Track listing ==
1. "Pick Along" (Earl Scruggs) – 1:46
2. "Nothin' To It" (Doc Watson) – 2:46
3. "Evelina" (Buck Graves, Josh Lambert) – 2:00
4. "Jazzing" (Lester Flatt, Earl Scruggs) – 2:02
5. "Liberty" (Flatt, Scruggs) – 2:13
6. "Tammy's Song" (Lester Flatt) – 1:55
7. "John Hardy Was A Desperate Little Man" (A.P. Carter) – 2:14
8. "Lonesome Reuben" (Earl Scruggs) – 2:19
9. "Spanish Two-Step" (Bob Wills) – 1:58
10. "Careless Love" (W. C. Handy, Martha Koenig, Spencer Williams) – 1:55
11. "Bill Cheatham" (Traditional) – 2:35

== Personnel ==
- Doc Watson – guitar
- Earl Scruggs – banjo
- Lester Flatt – guitar
- Grady Martin – guitar
- Charlie McCoy – harmonica
- Buddy Harman – snare drum
- Josh "Buck" Graves – dobro
- Paul Warren – fiddle
- Jake Tullock – bass
- Producers: Don Law, Frank Jones
- Liner Notes: Robert Shelton
- Cover art: Thomas B. Allen
