= Nashville Airplane =

1968 studio album by Flatt & Scruggs

Studio album by Flatt & Scruggs
- Released: 1968
- Genre: Bluegrass
- Label: Columbia (Limited Edition)
- Producer: Bob Johnston

Flatt & Scruggs chronology
The Story of Bonnie & Clyde (1968)	Nashville Airplane (1968)	Final Fling (1970)

Professional ratings
Review scores
Source	Rating
Rolling Stone	(favorable)

Nashville Airplane is the 27th album by Lester Flatt and Earl Scruggs released in 1968 on the Columbia Limited Edition label. It was recorded shortly before their breakup in 1969. Lester Flatt resisted the change in direction (although Earl Scruggs embraced it) to a point that led to the breakup.

== Track listing ==
1. "Like a Rolling Stone" (Bob Dylan)
2. "Folsom Prison Blues" (Johnny Cash)
3. "Gentle on My Mind" (John Hartford)
4. "If I Were a Carpenter" (Tim Hardin)
5. "Freida Florentine" (Gary Scruggs)
6. "I'll Be Your Baby Tonight" (Bob Dylan)
7. "Rainy Day Women#12 & 35" (Bob Dylan)
8. "Catch The Wind" (Donovan)
9. "Long Road to Houston" (Norman Stevens)
10. "The Times They Are A-Changin'" (Bob Dylan)
11. "Universal Soldier" (Buffy Sainte-Marie)

== Personnel ==
- Kenny Buttrey - drums
- Bobby Moore, Henry Strzelecki - bass guitar
- Norbert Putnam - bass guitar, harpsichord
- Charlie Daniels, Jerry Shook, Johnny Johnson - rhythm guitar
- Boomer Clarke, Jake Tullock - vocals
- Paul Warren - vocals, violin
- Josh "Buck" Graves - dobro
- Gary Scruggs - vocals, tambourine
- Randy Scruggs - lead guitar, 12-string guitar, 5-string dobro

== Production ==
- Sound Engineers - Charlie Bragg, Neil Wilburn & Jim Williamson
- Stereo Engineer - Mike Figlio
- Cover Art - Thomas B. Allen
