= Jim Shumate =

Jim Shumate (October 21, 1921 – October 10, 2013) was a fiddler that played with Bill Monroe and the Blue Grass Boys from 1943–1945. Shumate's main influences were Fiddlin' Arthur Smith, Curly Fox, and his uncle who played the fiddle while he was growing up. Shumate joined the band after Bill Monroe heard him playing on the radio station WHKY from downtown Hickory, North Carolina, and asked him to join the Blue Grass Boys. Howdy Forrester, who was Bill Monroe's fiddle player at the time, gave his notice and was going into the Navy. At age 20, Shumate became the fiddler for the Blue Grass Boys, and he sang bass on gospel songs. During this time, the Blue Grass Boys were also a baseball team, so they would arrive early to towns they were playing at and challenge the local baseball team. Unfortunately, there were no recordings made while Shumate was in the Blue Grass Boys.

During a visit to Nashville, Shumate met Earl Scruggs, who he knew because they were both from Hickory, North Carolina, and encouraged Scruggs to audition for Bill Monroe. During the time that Scruggs auditioned for Monroe, the band members were Jim Shumate, Lester Flatt, Sally Ann Forrester, Jim Andrews. By the next week, Howdy Forrester had returned from the Navy. He came back to play fiddle for the Blue Grass Boys and Jim Shumate left to work in the furniture business in North Carolina. Although Shumate convinced Earl Scruggs to audition for Monroe's band, he did not end up playing when Scruggs joined. In 1948, the band members of the Blue Grass Boys changed again. Lester Flatt and Earl Scruggs started their own band, The Foggy Mountain Boys, with Cedric Rainwater and Jim Eanes. Soon after, Jim Shumate joined them and played the fiddle on their first recording session. That same year, he competed against some of the best fiddlers in the United States and won the National Fiddler's Convention in Richlands, Virginia. He was known for his innovative, bluesy fiddle style and his mastery of syncopation and speed.

In 1995, Jim Shumate received a North Carolina Folk Heritage Award. He performed as a solo artist, composed sacred songs, and also played with his band, Sons of the Carolinas. In his final years, Jim had been battling kidney failure and dementia. On October 7, 2013 he became very ill. The next day, he took a serious fall and was taken to the hospital. He was later transferred to Catawba Regional Hospice near his home in Hickory, North Carolina where he died at the age of 91.
