= Nashville Grass =

American bluegrass band

The Nashville Grass was a bluegrass band founded by Lester Flatt in 1969, after the end of his partnership with Earl Scruggs and the Foggy Mountain Boys. Flatt hired most of the Foggy Mountain Boys for his new band.

Over the years, as with most bluegrass bands, the Nashville Grass saw numerous changes in personnel, including the addition of contemporary country music star Marty Stuart, who started with Flatt at the age of 13. Lester Flatt continued to record and perform with the Nashville Grass until his death in 1979; at that time, Curly Seckler became leader of the band.

== Members ==
- Lester Flatt (guitar)
- Johnny Johnson (guitar, bass)
- John Ray "Curly" Seckler (guitar)
- Roland White (mandolin)
- Marty Stuart (mandolin, guitar, fiddle)
- Vic Jordan (banjo)
- Haskel McCormick (banjo)
- Kenny Ingram (banjo)
- Blake Williams (banjo)
- Paul Warren (fiddle)
- Clarence "Tater" Tate (fiddle)
- Burkett "Josh" Graves (Dobro)
- Jack Martin (Dobro)
- Charlie Nixon (Dobro)
- English P. "Jake" Tullock(bass)
- Jack Hicks (bass)
- Pete Corum (bass)
