= Folk Songs of Our Land =

Studio album by Flatt and Scruggs
- Released: 1962
- Genre: Country
- Label: Columbia

Flatt and Scruggs chronology
Songs of the Famous Carter Family (1961)	Folk Songs of Our Land (1962)	Hard Travelin' (The Ballad of Jed Clampett) (1963)

Folk Songs of Our Land is a studio album by bluegrass artists Flatt and Scruggs. It was released in 1962 by Columbia Records, catalog numbers CL 1830 (mono) and CS 8630 (stereo).

The album was released before Billboard magazine began maintaining its Top Country Albums chart in 1964. The album was part of Louise Scruggs' plan to give the group a facelift by adding older folk songs to their repertoire.

== Track listing ==
Side A

1. "The Legend Of The Johnson Boys" (Flatt, Scruggs) [2:15]
2. "Hear The Wind Blow" (M. Carter, Flatt, Scruggs) [3:05]
3. "George Alley's F.F.V." (Flatt, Scruggs) [3:45]
4. "Good Times Are Past And Gone" (Flatt, Scruggs) [2:33]
5. "Ellen Smith" (Flatt, Scruggs) [2:27]
6. "Sun's Gonna Shine In My Back Door Some Day" (A.P. Carter) [2:18]

Side B

1. "This Land Is Your Land" (W. Guthrie) [2:26]
2. "Philadelphia Lawyer" (W. Guthrie) [2:45]
3. "Life of Trouble" (Flatt, Scruggs) [2:41]
4. "Nine Pound Hammer" (Merle Travis) [2:23]
5. "I'll Be No Man's Wife" (Flatt, Scruggs) [2:36]
6. "McKinley's Gone" (Flatt, Scruggs) [2:33]
