= Jody Rainwater =

Jody Rainwater, also known as Little Jody Rainwater (born Charles Edward Johnson, Surry County, North Carolina, 1920 – died Richmond, Virginia, December 24, 2011), was an American bluegrass musician and radio personality.

Rainwater was one of thirteen children of M. Wilson and Emma Johnson. He was well known for having played bass with The Foggy Mountain Boys. An elder brother had taken up guitar, and soon they began playing together as "Chuck and Slim, The Johnson Brothers". They played at reunions and social gatherings around the area. The brothers found themselves in High Point, North Carolina, auditioning for the new radio station WMFR which began broadcasting in 1936. They were offered a regular time slot every Thursday morning. Their father believed farm work should take priority, so they eventually cancelled their weekly show. The next big thing for The Johnson Brothers occurred at the 1937 Fourth of July Horse Show in Kernersville, North Carolina. There the brothers entered a competition for performers and won the award for "Best Individual Entertainers".

Rainwater decided to move to Winston-Salem. For four years he found few opportunities in music. He served in the Marines during World War II. In April 1945 he was discharged from active duty and returned to Winston-Salem, where he found work at an auto dealership. While employed there he met a local musician, Woody Hauser. The two formed the band the Blue Ridge Mountain Boys. In 1946 they helped sign on station WTOB and became a regular part of its programming. While playing for WTOB the band played a few local shows in nearby schools. It was during this time that Charles Johnson became "Little Jody". Clad in baggy pants, suspenders, and old shirts the character that would soon be made famous with Flat and Scruggs was born. Little Jody and Woody played together for almost three years. After a trip with Woody and several friends to the Grand Ole Opry, Jody determined that he would one day play the Opry. After the trip Jody and Woody were offered the chance to play during the intermission of a Bill Monroe road show in Lexington, North Carolina, which is where Rainwater first met Lester Flatt.

In 1948, Jody Rainwater left North Carolina for Roanoke, Virginia where he joined the Blue Star Boys. Later that year he learned that Flatt, Earl Scruggs, and others were leaving the Blue Grass Boys to form the Foggy Mountain Boys. Jody was asked to join them to handle bookings and advertising, but he decided to stay in Roanoke. In 1949 a coal strike devastated the Bristol area's economy and the Foggy Mountain Boys left WCYB for Lexington, Kentucky. WCYB offered the Farm and Fun Time slot to the Blue Star Boys and they took it. This didn't work out well, and at this point Flatt again offered the booking job to Jody, who immediately accepted it.

In addition to booking, Jody joined the group on their Saturday night slot on WVLK's Jamboree as Cedric Rainwater's comedic partner. The comedy duo was a hit and Jody was soon being billed as Cedric's younger brother. Lester Flatt suggested the name Little Jody Rainwater and it really stuck. However, the comedic antics of the Rainwater brothers were short lived. Soon Cedric decided to join Hank Williams' Drifting Cowboys and leave bluegrass. The Foggy Mountain Boys found themselves in need of a bassist. For the next three years Rainwater played an important part in the band's sound and stage presence. He was both booking and playing shows. Working seven days a week up to eighteen hours a day. By May 1952 Jody was "right at a nervous breakdown", and, at the advice of a physician he put in his notice. The band was working in central Virginia at the time and he was offered a job working as a deejay at WSVS. With flexible hours and steady pay Jody jumped at the chance. On June 7, 1952, Rainwater left the Foggy Mountain Boys and began his career in radio.

== Sources ==
- Hinton, John A. (January 1981). "Jody Rainwater "Bluegrass Reflections"". Bluegrass Unlimited.
