= Fiddlin' Arthur Smith =

American fiddler (1898–1971)

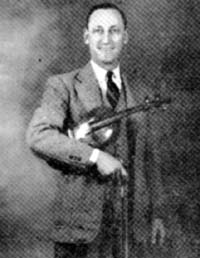

Background information
- Born: Arthur Smith; April 10, 1898; Bold Springs, Tennessee, United States
- Died: February 28, 1971 (aged 72) Louisville, Kentucky, United States
- Genres: Country, old-time music
- Occupation: Musician
- Instrument: Fiddle
- Years active: 1920s–1960s

Fiddlin' Arthur Smith (April 10, 1898 – February 28, 1971) was an American old time fiddler and a major influence on the old time and bluegrass music genres.

== Biography ==
Smith was born and raised on a farm near Bold Springs, Tennessee, United States. He learned to play the fiddle at an early age, his first influence being the fiddlers Grady Stringer and Walter Warden. He married in 1914 at the age of sixteen. Initially he began performing at local dances and fiddlers' conventions. He teamed up with his wife Nettie, his cousin Homer Smith and fiddler Floyd Ethredge. In 1921, Smith began working as a logger and a linesman for a railroad company in Dickson, Tennessee. In his work he had to make extensive travels and that enabled him to meet other musicians along the way. He attended several fiddle contests across Tennessee winning the bulk of them.

Smith made his solo debut as a fiddler on the Grand Ole Opry on December 23, 1927. He was made a member of The Opry in the 1920s. Within weeks he was accompanied by his cousin Homer Smith. In the meantime, Fiddlin' Arthur Smith continued to work on the railroad. In the 1930s, Smith formed The Dixieliners together with the McGee Brothers, and his daughter Lavonne who played the piano. They became a regular act on the Opry in May 1932 performing popular songs such as "Walking in My Sleep", "Pig in the Pen" and "Blackberry Blossom". The Dixieliners toured the countryside featuring Uncle Dave Macon and the Delmore Brothers on some of these tours. In January 1935, Smith made his first recordings with the Delmore Brothers on the Bluebird label. In 1936, Smith began to sing on his recordings on songs such as, "Chittlin' Cookin' Time in Cheatham County", "There's More Pretty Girls Than One", and his signature song, "Beautiful Brown Eyes". That particular song, recorded in August 1937, led Smith to take action in court against some musicians, who had recorded the song as if it was in the public domain. He ended up winning the suit.

Because of the hard work it took to maintain two full-time jobs, on the railroad and as a professional musician, Smith fell into hard drinking. In February 1938, it led to a temporary three-month suspension from the Opry. With assistance from Roy Acuff, Smith returned to the music circuit.

In 1938, Smith's first recordings as Arthur Smith & His Dixieliners appeared on Bluebird, a band name he would again and again revisit, into the 1960s. In 1939, Smith joined the Tennessee Valley Boys, consisting of Howdy Forrester and Georgia Slim Rutland. The following year, he left to join the Shelton Brothers in Shreveport, Louisiana. Once again, he left and instead formed a new group, The Band of Arthurs, in Decatur, Alabama with his daughter Lavonne and some other musicians all named Arthur.

In the early 1940s, Smith joined the Bailes Brothers, and published two songbooks, Songs From the Hills of Tennessee and Arthur Smith's Original Song Folio no. 1. In the following years, he performed with artists such as Rex Griffin and Jimmy Wakely. This led to an invitation from Hollywood in 1944 to appear in some low budget westerns. His film career ended in 1948. Smith signed with Capitol Records, but to avoid confusion with the newcomer Arthur "Guitar Boogie" Smith, Fiddlin' Arthur Smith's recordings were released under the name of The Original Arthur Smith and His Dixieliners. After a brief stint with Billy Walker, Smith retired, and briefly worked as a carpenter in Nashville, Tennessee.

Roy Acuff performed and recorded Smith's song, "Beautiful, Brown Eyes". This led to several artists recording the song, believing it was in the public domain, and Smith had to sue them in court. He eventually won the suit and received a lump sum.

Smith made a comeback and joined up with Merle Travis. In 1957, Mike Seeger arranged a recording session with Smith and the McGee Brothers, held in Kirk McGee's living room. Eight years later, the recordings were released on an album. In 1965, Smith and the McGee Brothers appeared at the Newport Folk Festival. He made his last appearance in 1969, with Sleepy Marlin and Tommy Riggs. Smith died in 1971 in Louisville, Kentucky, and was buried near McEwen, Tennessee.

== Discography ==
78s: In various prewar line-ups, Smith recorded singles on Bluebird, Victor, Regal Zonophone (Australia), The Twin (India), and Montgomery Ward labels, and in the post-war years on Black & White, Capitol, and Urban.

LPs:

- Fiddlin’ Arthur Smith & The Dixieliners : Rare Old Time Fiddle Tunes - Starday SLP-202 (1962); reissued Pine Mountain PMR-202.
- Arthur Smith & the McGee Brothers : Mountain Songs and Instrumentals - Folkways FA-2379 (1964)
- Arthur Smith & the McGee Brothers : Milk 'Em in the Evening Blues - Folkways FTS-31007 (1968)

Reissued material also appears on:

- Fiddlin’ Arthur Smith & His Dixieliners : Vol. 1 - County 546 (1978)
- Fiddlin’ Arthur Smith & His Dixieliners : Vol. 2 - County 547 (1978)
- Fiddlin’ Arthur Smith & His Dixieliners : eponymous - County CO-CD-3526 (2002)
- Fiddlin’ Arthur Smith & His Dixieliners : Appalachian Stomp Down, Disc D - JSP JSP-7761D (2006)

== Bibliography ==
- Ryan J. Thompson, The Fiddler's Almanac: A Wealth of Fiddling Lore and Illustrations, 1985
- Ivan M. Tribe, Country: A Regional Exploration, 2006, Greenwood Press, ISBN 978-0313330261
