= Songs of Glory =

Studio album by Flatt and Scruggs
- Released: 1960
- Genre: Country
- Label: Columbia

Flatt and Scruggs chronology
Lester Flatt & Earl Scruggs (1959)	Songs of Glory (1960)	Foggy Mountain Banjo (1961)

Songs of Glory is a studio album by bluegrass artists Flatt and Scruggs with the Foggy Mountain Boys. It was released in 1960 by Columbia Records, catalog numbers CL 1424 (mono) and CS 8221 (stereo).

The album was released before Billboard magazine began maintaining its Top Country Albums chart in 1964. It was part of Louise Scruggs' plan to give the group a facelift by adding older folk songs to their repertoire.

== Track listing ==
Side A

1. "When the Angels Carry Me Home" (Charlie Monroe) [2:19]
2. "Heaven" (B. & H. McSpadden) [2:31]
3. "Get on That Road to Glory" (Louise Certain, Gladys Stacey, Benny Martin) [2:12]
4. "Bubbling in My Soul" (Jerry Organ, T.D. James) [2:13]
5. "I'm on My Way to Canaan's Land" (A.P. Carter) [2:20]
6. "Give Mother My Crown" (Walter Bailes) [2:47]

Side B

1. "Angel Band" (P. Jones) [2:31]
2. "You Can Feel It in Your Soul" (Stacey) [2:23]
3. "I'll Never Be Lonesome Again" (G.T. Dixon) [2:21]
4. "Take Me in the Lifeboat" (Frank Southern) [2:37]
5. "Joy Bells" (Organ, Certain, Stacey) [2:21]
6. "Give Me Flowers While I'm Living" (E. Bigger, Certain, Stacey) [2:31]
