= WSVS =

- Crewe, Virginia; United States
- Broadcast area: Southside Virginia
- Frequency: 800 kHz
- Branding: 97.1 FM and 800 AM WSVS

Programming
- Format: Classic country; bluegrass
- Affiliations: Westwood One

Ownership
- Owner: Gee Communications, Inc.

History
- First air date: April 6, 1947
- Call sign meaning: "Southside Virginia's Voice of Service"

Technical information
- Licensing authority: FCC
- Facility ID: 320
- Class: B
- Power: 10,000 watts day; 270 watts night
- Transmitter coordinates: 37°11′43.6″N 78°10′0″W
- Translator: see below

Links
- Public license information: Public file; LMS
- Webcast: Listen live
- Website: www.wsvsamfm.com

WSVS (800 AM) is a classic country and bluegrass formatted broadcast radio station licensed to Crewe, Virginia, serving Southside Virginia. WSVS is owned and operated by Gee Communications, Inc.

== History ==
WSVS began broadcasting April 4, 1947, on a frequency of 650 kHz. Formal dedication ceremonies, held April 6, 1947, included transcribed speeches by government officials and broadcasts from the station's studios in Crewe, Blackstone and Farmville. The station was licensed to Southern Virginia Broadcasting Company.

In 1955, WSVS received the Douglas Southall Freeman Award for public service in radio journalism from the Virginia Associated Press Broadcasters. The award was for the station's coverage of three hurricanes, Connie, Diane and Hazel.

The station changed formats to sports on August 11, 2014, after years as a classic country and bluegrass station. On October 15, 2014, WSVS changed its format back to classic country and bluegrass.

== Translator ==
In addition to the main station, WSVS is relayed by an FM translator to widen its broadcast area.

| Call sign | Frequency | City of license | FID | ERP (W) | HAAT | Class | FCC info |
|---|---|---|---|---|---|---|---|
| W246BZ | (97.1 FM) FM | Crewe, Virginia | 18871 | 250 watts | 56.7 m (186 ft) | D | LMS |
