= Josh Graves =

American bluegrass musician

- Born: Burkett Howard Graves; September 27, 1927
- Origin: Tennessee, USA
- Died: September 30, 2006 (aged 79)
- Occupation: Musician
- Instruments: Resophonic guitar, bass

Josh Graves (September 27, 1927 Tellico Plains, Monroe County, Tennessee – September 30, 2006), born Burkett Howard Graves, was an American bluegrass musician. Also known by the nicknames "Buck," and "Uncle Josh," he is credited with introducing the resonator guitar (commonly known under the trade name of Dobro) into bluegrass music shortly after joining Lester Flatt, Earl Scruggs and the Foggy Mountain Boys in 1955. He was inducted into the International Bluegrass Music Hall of Honor in 1997.

He joined producers Randall Franks and Alan Autry for the In the Heat of the Night cast CD “Christmas Time’s A Comin’” performing "Christmas Time's A Comin'" with the cast on the CD released on Sonlite and MGM/UA for one of the most popular Christmas releases of 1991 and 1992 with Southern retailers.

== Career ==
- 1942 Joined the Pierce Brothers playing in Gatlinburg
- Played with Esco Hankins and Mac Wiseman
- Joined Wheeling, West Virginia's WWVA Jamboree with Wilma Lee and Stoney Cooper
- 1955-1969 Lester Flatt, Earl Scruggs and the Foggy Mountain Boys
- 1969-1971 Lester Flatt's Nashville Grass.
- 1971-1974 Earl Scruggs Revue.
- 1974 started solo career.
- 1984-2006 performed and recorded with Kenny Baker and also with the Masters including Baker, Jesse McReynolds and Eddie Adcock.

== Musical style ==
Graves originally joined the Foggy Mountain Boys as a bass player but collaborated with bandmate Earl Scruggs to develop a new style of dobro-picking based on Scruggs' three-finger syncopated banjo style. Graves switched to the dobro; his way of playing helped propel the instrument into becoming one of the defining features of the bluegrass sound. Graves adoption of hammer-ons and pull-offs to combine open strings and fretted notes in rapid scalar passages elevated the Dobro to the level of holding its own with the fiddle and banjo. Graves played fast and loud but also created extremely sensitive melodic backing to bluesy ballads and slower gospel numbers. Josh Graves is credited as being a major influence on many leading resophonic guitar players, including Jerry Douglas, Mike Auldridge, and Phil Leadbetter among them.

== Selected discography ==
=== Albums ===
Title	Label	Year
Bluegrass Hits Just Joshing	Cotton Town Jubilee	1964
Uncle Josh And His Dobro	Cotton Town Jubilee	1965
Something Different	Puritan	1972
Bucktime	Puritan	1974
Alone At Last	Epic	1974
Josh Graves With Bobby Smith	Vetco	1976
Sweet Sunny South	CMH	1976
Sing Bluegrass Vol. 2 With Josh Graves	Vetco	1976
Meetin' At The Crossroads	Music City Workshop	1977
Same Old Blues	CMH	1977
Smokin' Bluegrass	CMH	1978
Bluegrass Specials:We're Gonna Have A Ball	Cowboy Carl	1979
First Breath Of Spring	Koala	1979
Sing Away The Pain	CMH	1979
King Of The Cobra	CMH	1980
Playing It Simple	Vetco	1980
Living Legends:Dobro And Fiddle Instrumentals	Old Homestead	1983
Something Old, Something New	Atteiram	1984
Flying South:Fiddle And Dobro Bluegrass Instrumentals	Ridge Runner	1986
Tennessee-Kentucky Favorites	Montana Country	1987
Dad The Dobro Man	CMH	1987
The Real Josh:Super Sidemen Vol. 1	Amber	1988
The Puritan Sessions	Rebel	1989
Plays Country Classics	Legend	1993
Sings Country Classics	Legend	1994
Church In The Wildwood	Legend	1995
Live In Port Huron, Michigan	Legend	1995
The Graves Situation	Legend	1996
King Of The Dobro:A Musical Documentary	CMH	1996
Josh Graves Dobro	Rebel	1998
Overdue	Foster Creek	1998
Sultan Of Slide	OMS	2000
World Famous Dobro	Starday	2002
Memories Of Foggy Mountain	OMS	2002
Just Joshin'	Red Clay	2005
