= Paul Warren (fiddler) =

American fiddle player

- Born: May 17, 1918; Lyles, Tennessee, U.S.
- Died: January 12, 1978 (aged 59)
- Genre: Bluegrass
- Occupation: Bluegrass artist
- Instrument: Fiddle
- Years active: 1933-1977

Paul Warren (May 17, 1918 –January 12, 1978) was an American fiddle player best known for his work on a number of Kitty Wells singles, and his long tenure with Flatt and Scruggs and the Foggy Mountain Boys.

== Biography ==
Warren was born in Lyles, Tennessee to a father who played guitar and banjo, and a mother who played clawhammer banjo.

Warren's fiddling style was heavily influenced by Fiddlin' Arthur Smith, with whom he played extensively offstage. In 1933, Warren joined Johnny & Jack and the Tennessee Mountain Boys, with whom he appeared regularly on the Grand Ole Opry. During that time he recorded a number of sides with Kitty Wells, including It Wasn't God Who Made Honky Tonk Angels and Release Me.

He joined Flatt and Scruggs and the Foggy Mountain Boys in 1954, after fifteen years with the Tennessee Mountain Boys. As a member of that band, he was often called upon in concert segments featuring traditional fiddle tunes, including a number of the Arthur Smith tunes which had been recorded by Flatt and Scruggs, such as "Pig in the Pen". He would also provided bass vocals to many of songs that featured group harmony.

When Flatt and Scruggs broke up in 1969, Warren decided to stay with Lester Flatt's band. In 1978 CMH Records released America's Greatest Breakdown Fiddler, credited to ''Paul Warren with Lester Flatt & the Nashville Grass''.

== Legacy ==
Warren helped perpetuate the old-time fiddle style typified by Arthur Smith, and has been cited by a number of musicians as an influence, including fiddler Andrea Zonn and mandolin player Roland White. His son Johnny Warren continues to play his repertoire, on the same fiddle as his dad. In 2009 and 2011, Johnny recorded two albums featuring noted bluegrass musicians, A Tribute to Fiddlin' Paul Warren Vols. 1 and 2 on which he played tunes for which is father was well known.

== Awards and honors ==
Warren was inducted into the Bluegrass Music Hall of Fame in 2013.
