= Howdy Forrester =

American singer-songwriter (1922–1987)

- Birth name: Howard Wilson Forrester
- Also known as: Big Howdy Forrester
- Born: March 31, 1922
- Origin: Vernon, Tennessee, US
- Died: August 1, 1987 (aged 65)
- Genres: bluegrass
- Occupation: Musician
- Instrument: Fiddle
- Years active: 1930s–1980s

Howdy Forrester (March 31, 1922 – August 1, 1987), born Howard Wilson Forrester, was an American bluegrass fiddler and a popularizer and practiser of the "Texas" or "show fiddle" style. He was a long-time member of Roy Acuff's Smoky Mountain Boys.

== Biography ==
Forrester was born near Vernon, in Hickman County, Tennessee, into a family of many fiddlers; his father, grandfather, and uncle all played the fiddle. He grew up as the youngest of four brothers. In 1927, their father was killed in an automobile accident when his vehicle was hit by a train. In 1933, during a convalescence from rheumatic fever where he was bedridden for months, Forrester learned to play the fiddle.

After his family moved to Nashville in the mid-1930s, Forrester began performing with his brothers. In 1938, he joined The Vagabonds and landed a job on the Grand Ole Opry. When Herald Goodman of the Vagabonds formed another act called the Tennessee Valley Boys, Forrester was soon to join up. He and Herald Goodman received an offer in 1939 to join the Saddle Mountain Roundup radio show in Tulsa, Oklahoma. During this time, Forrester received his nickname, "Big Howdy," by Goodman.

In 1940, he moved to Nashville with his wife to work with Bill Monroe and Monroe's group, the Blue Grass Boys. In 1943, he was drafted and had to leave the band (he was replaced by Jim Shumate) but his wife Billie "Sally Ann" Forrester remained with Monroe as his sole accordion player until 1945. After Forrester's discharge from the US Navy in 1946, he returned temporarily to Monroe. Soon he moved to Dallas to join Georgia Slim Rutland and the Texas Roundup performing at KRLD-AM.

In 1950, he joined Cowboy Copas before becoming a full-time member of Roy Acuff and His Smoky Mountain Boys in 1951. He also made recordings with Flatt & Scruggs in the early 1950s. In 1960, he recorded a solo album called Fancy Fiddlin' Country Style for the MGM subsidiary Cub label. In 1964, Forrester joined the Acuff-Rose Artists Corporation and remained a member of the Smokey Mountain Boys until his death in 1987. He continued to record solo albums during the 1970s and 1980s.

Forrester died at his home in Nashville.
