= Curly Seckler =

American bluegrass musician (1919–2017)

Background information
- Born: John Ray Sechler; December 25, 1919; China Grove, North Carolina, U.S.
- Died: December 27, 2017 (aged 98) Nashville, Tennessee, U.S.
- Genres: Bluegrass
- Occupations: Musicican; vocalist
- Instruments: Vocals; guitar; mandolin; tenor banjo
- Years active: 1930s–2017

John Ray Sechler (December 25, 1919 – December 27, 2017), known professionally as Curly Seckler, was an American bluegrass musician. He played with Lester Flatt and Earl Scruggs in their band, Foggy Mountain Boys, from 1949 to 1962, as well as other bluegrass acts during his career in music.

== Early years ==
John Ray Sechler was born to Carrie and Calvin Sechler in China Grove, North Carolina, on December 25, 1919. He learned to play music from his parents during his formative years. His father, Calvin, played old time fiddle, harmonica, and autoharp, while his mother, Carrie, taught him how to play the organ. Seckler, like most of his local contemporaries, worked a life of labor in a local cotton mill with his brothers, though it did not hamper his musical development. Seckler found time to keep up his love for music, expanding his musical knowledge by picking up the five-string banjo. He learned to play the banjo from local musician, Happy Trexler.

== Career ==
In the early years of his professional career, Seckler accompanied his brothers, George and Duard, with tenor banjo and vocal harmonies in their group, "The Yodeling Rangers." They were propelled to local stardom in 1935 when they were invited to perform daily on the radio in Salisbury, North Carolina.

The Yodeling Rangers changed their name to The Trail Riders, and began playing steadily throughout the Southeastern United States. They caught the eye of Charlie Monroe, brother of Bill Monroe and former guitarist of the Monroe Brothers. Monroe was looking for new musicians to play with on the emerging Bluegrass circuit and proposed that Seckler join him on tour. Seckler, then nineteen years old, agreed and received twenty dollars a week as payment.

Seckler continued to enjoy success on the Bluegrass touring circuit, and in 1949 joined Lester Flatt, Earl Scruggs, and the rest of the Foggy Mountain Boys band. In this new ensemble, Seckler continued to sing tenor harmonies but switched to the mandolin. In this same year, Bill Monroe released a song called "Traveling This Lonesome Road," which Curly and his wife Juanita had written, but hadn't copyrighted. Bill recorded the tune with Mac Wiseman and released it in 1949. Curly left the Foggy Mountain Boys briefly in March 1951 and was replaced by Everette Lilly. During this time, Curly went to WCYB to work with The Sauceman Brothers & the Green Valley Boys for a short period of time before joining the Stanley Brothers and replacing Bobby Osbourne. It was only a couple weeks after playing with the Stanley's that Curly left the band due to Carter Stanley's drinking habit. After leaving the Stanley's, Curly started a new group, called "The Cumberland Mountain Boys", with Jim & Jesse McReynolds to replace Flatt & Scruggs's position at the Kentucky Barn dance in Versailles, KY. But before they were ever able to play at the barn dance, the venue changed owners and ended up closing down. At this point, Flatt & Scruggs offered Curly Seckler his position back in the Foggy Mountain Boys band, and Curly rejoined at the end of 1951. Curly stayed with Flatt and Scruggs until 1962, recording over 130 songs while in the band. After Flatt and Scruggs, Curly took a break from the music business until 1973, when Lester Flatt asked him to be a part of his group, the Nashville Grass Band. Upon Lester Flatt's death in 1979, Seckler became the leader of the Nashville Grass band and continued playing with the band. Seckler held this position until his retirement in 1994 (Seckler AP).

== Later years and death ==
The International Bluegrass Music Association honored Seckler in 2004 by inducting him into its International Bluegrass Music Hall of Fame; Seckler was inducted into the North Carolina Music Hall of Fame in 2010. His release of "Sixty Years of Bluegrass with My Friends" in 2005 on the Copper Creek label solidified Seckler's place as one of the pioneers of the genre and steward of customs and traditions. Throughout his career, Seckler played with Jim and Jesse McReynolds, Mac Wiseman, the Stanley Brothers, the Nashville Grass, Doyle Lawson, and many others. Seckler died in his sleep on December 27, 2017, just two days after his 98th birthday.
