= Earl Scruggs =

American musician (1924–2012)

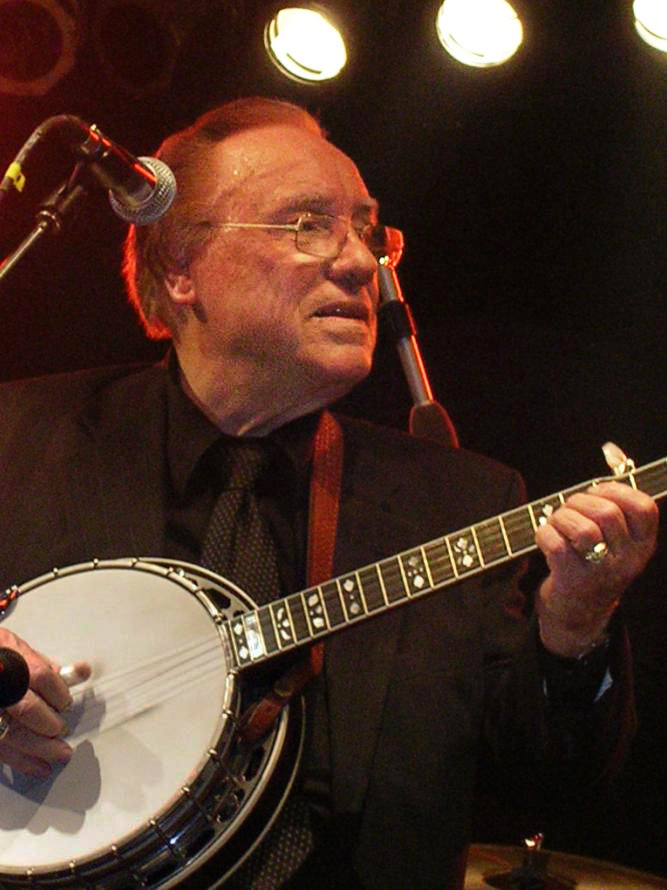
- Scruggs in 2005

Background information
- Born: Earl Eugene Scruggs; January 6, 1924; Cleveland County, North Carolina, U.S.
- Died: March 28, 2012 (aged 88) Nashville, Tennessee, U.S.
- Genres: Bluegrass; progressive country; gospel
- Occupation: Musician
- Instruments: Banjo; guitar
- Years active: 1935–2012
- Labels: Mercury; Columbia; OKeh; MCA Nashville
- Formerly of: Flatt and Scruggs
- Website: earlscruggs.com

Earl Eugene Scruggs (January 6, 1924 – March 28, 2012) was an American musician noted for popularizing a three-finger banjo picking style, now called "Scruggs style", which is a defining characteristic of bluegrass music. His three-finger style of playing was radically different from the traditional way the five-string banjo had previously been played. This new style of playing became popular and elevated the banjo from its previous role as a background rhythm instrument to featured solo status. He popularized the instrument across several genres of music.

Scruggs played in Bill Monroe's band, the Blue Grass Boys. "Bluegrass" eventually became the name for an entire genre of country music. Despite considerable success with Monroe, performing on the Grand Ole Opry and recording classic hits such as "Blue Moon of Kentucky", Scruggs resigned from the group in 1948 because of their exhausting touring schedule. Fellow band member Lester Flatt resigned as well, and he and Scruggs later paired up in the duo Flatt and Scruggs. Scruggs's banjo instrumental "Foggy Mountain Breakdown" was recorded in December 1949 and released in March 1950. The tune became an enduring hit. It experienced a rebirth of popularity to a younger generation when it was featured in the 1967 film Bonnie and Clyde. The song won two Grammy Awards and, in 2005, was selected for the Library of Congress' National Recording Registry of works of unusual merit.

Flatt and Scruggs brought bluegrass music into mainstream popularity in the early 1960s with their country hit "The Ballad of Jed Clampett", the theme music for the television sitcom The Beverly Hillbillies—the first Scruggs recording to reach number one on the Billboard charts. Over their 20-year association, Flatt and Scruggs recorded over 50 albums and 75 singles. The duo broke up in 1969, chiefly because, while Scruggs wanted to switch styles to fit a more modern sound, Flatt was a traditionalist who opposed the change and believed doing so would alienate a fan base of bluegrass purists. Although each of them formed a new band to match their visions, neither of them ever regained the success they had achieved as a team.

Scruggs received four Grammy awards, a Grammy Lifetime Achievement Award and a National Medal of Arts. He became a member of the International Bluegrass Music Hall of Fame and was given a star on the Hollywood Walk of Fame. In 1985, Flatt and Scruggs were inducted together into the Country Music Hall of Fame and named, as a duo, number 24 on CMT's "40 Greatest Men of Country Music". Scruggs was awarded a National Heritage Fellowship by the National Endowment for the Arts, the highest honor in the folk and traditional arts in the United States. Four works by Scruggs have been placed in the Grammy Hall of Fame. After Scruggs's death in 2012 at age 88, the Earl Scruggs Center was founded in Shelby, North Carolina, near his birthplace with the aid of a federal grant and corporate donors. The center is a $5.5 million facility that features the musical contributions of Scruggs and serves as an educational center providing classes and field trips for students.

== Early life ==
External audio
- Bluegrass Musician Earl Scruggs, interviewed by Terry Gross on Fresh Air, 34:58, January 9, 2004.

Earl Scruggs was born January 6, 1924, in the Flint Hill community of Cleveland County, North Carolina, a small community just outside of Boiling Springs, about 10 miles west of Shelby. His father, George Elam Scruggs, was a farmer and a bookkeeper who died of a protracted illness when Earl was four years old. Upon his father's death, Scruggs's mother, Georgia Lula Ruppe (called Lula), was left to take care of the farm and five children, of which Earl was the youngest.

The family members all played music. The father played an open back banjo using the frailing technique, though as an adult Earl had no recollection of his father's playing. Mrs. Scruggs played the pump organ. Earl's siblings, older brothers Junie and Horace and older sisters Eula Mae and Ruby, all played banjo and guitar. Scruggs recalled a visit to his uncle's home at age six to hear a blind banjo player named Mack Woolbright, who played a finger-picking style and had recorded for Columbia Records. It made an impression on Scruggs, who said, "He'd sit in the rocking chair, and he'd pick some and it was just amazing. I couldn't imagine—he was the first, what I call a good banjo player." Scruggs then took up the instrument—he was too small to hold it at first and improvised by setting his brother Junie's banjo beside him on the floor. He moved it around depending on what part of the neck he was playing. After his father's death, Scruggs seemed to take solace in playing music, and when not in school or doing farm chores, spent nearly every spare moment he had practicing. His first radio performance was at age 11 on a talent scout show. Because his father had died, Scruggs was deferred from military service in World War II so he could support his mother.

== Development ==
Finger picks on thumb, index and middle finger

Scruggs is noted for popularizing a three-finger banjo-picking style now called "Scruggs style" that has become a defining characteristic of bluegrass music. Prior to Scruggs, most banjo players used the frailing or clawhammer technique, which consists of holding the fingers bent like a claw and moving the entire hand in a downward motion so that the strings are struck with the back of the middle fingernail. This motion is followed by striking the thumb on a single string. The three-finger style of playing is radically different from frailing; the hand remains stationary and only the fingers and thumb move, somewhat similar to classical guitar technique. Scruggs style also involves using picks on three digits (see photo), each plucking individual strings—downward with the thumb, then upward with the index and middle finger in sequence. When done skillfully and in rapid sequence, the style allows any digit (though usually the thumb) to play a melody, while the other two digits play arpeggios of the melody line. The use of picks gives each note a louder percussive attack, creating an exciting effect, described by The New York Times as "like thumbtacks plinking rhythmically on a tin roof". This departure from traditional playing elevated the banjo to become more of a solo instrument—a promotion from its former role of providing background rhythm or serving as a comedian's prop—and popularized the instrument in several genres of music.

Earl Scruggs did not invent three-finger banjo playing; in fact, he said the three-finger style was the most common way to play the five-string banjo in his hometown in western North Carolina. An early influence was a local banjoist, DeWitt "Snuffy" Jenkins, who plucked in a finger style. According to banjoist and historian Tony Trischka, "Jenkins came about as close as one could to Scruggs style without actually playing it". At age ten, when Scruggs first learned the technique, he recalled that he was at home in his room after a quarrel with his brother. He was idly playing a song called "Reuben" and suddenly realized that he was playing with three fingers, not two. "That excited me to no end", he later recalled, and said he ran through the house repeatedly yelling "I've got it". From there he devoted all his free time to perfecting his timing and to adding syncopation and variations to it. Controversy exists as to the actual origin of three-finger picking style. Don Reno, an eminent banjo player who also played this style and who knew Scruggs at that young age, described Scruggs's early playing as similar to that of Snuffy Jenkins. Scruggs, however, consistently referred to it as his own, saying that he adapted to it "a syncopated roll that was quite different." On the subject, John Hartford said, "Here's the way I feel about it. Everybody's all worried about who invented the style and it's obvious that three finger banjo pickers have been around a long time—maybe since 1840. But it's my feeling that if it wasn't for Earl Scruggs, you wouldn't be worried about who invented it."

== With Bill Monroe and the Blue Grass Boys ==
At age 15, Scruggs played in a group called The Morris Brothers for a few months, but quit to work in a factory making sewing thread in the Lily Textile Mill near his home in North Carolina. He worked there about two years, earning 40 cents an hour, until the draft restriction for World War II was lifted in 1945, at which time he returned to music, performing with "Lost John Miller and his Allied Kentuckians" on WNOX in Knoxville. About this time an opening to play with Bill Monroe became available.

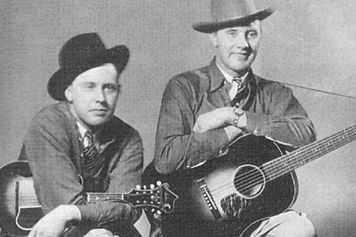
Bill and Charlie Monroe, c. 1936

Bill Monroe, 13 years older than Scruggs, was prominent in country music at the time. His career started with the "Monroe Brothers", a duo with his brother Charlie. Bill sang the high tenor harmony parts, a sound called "high lonesome", for which he became noted. The brothers split up in 1938 and Bill, a native of "the Bluegrass State" of Kentucky, formed a new group called Bill Monroe and the Blue Grass Boys. They first played on the Opry in 1939 and soon became a popular touring band featuring a vocalist named Lester Flatt. The name "bluegrass" stuck and eventually became the eponym for this entire genre of country music and Monroe became known as "the father of bluegrass".

When Scruggs was 21, Monroe was looking for a banjo player for his group, because David "Stringbean" Akeman was quitting. At the time, banjo players often functioned in the band as comedians, and the instrument was often held as a prop—their clawhammer playing was almost inaudible. Monroe, along with band member Lester Flatt, auditioned several banjo players who had the same traditional playing style as Akeman. When Scruggs auditioned for them at the Tulane Hotel in Nashville, Flatt said, "I was thrilled. It was so different! I had never heard that kind of banjo picking." Scruggs joined Monroe in late 1945, earning $50 a week. After they accepted Scruggs as one of the Blue Grass Boys, the roster consisted of Bill Monroe (vocals/mandolin), Lester Flatt (guitar/vocals), Earl Scruggs (banjo), Chubby Wise (fiddle), and Howard Watts (stage name Cedric Rainwater) on bass. This group of men became the prototype of what a bluegrass band would become.

With Monroe and Lester Flatt, Scruggs performed on the Grand Ole Opry and in September 1946 recorded the classic hit "Blue Moon of Kentucky"; a song that was designated by the Library of Congress to be added to the National Recording Registry, and later added to the Grammy Hall of Fame. The work schedule was heavy in Monroe's band. They were playing a lot of jobs in movie theaters all over the south, riding in a 1941 Chevrolet from town to town, doing up to six shows a day and not finishing up until about eleven at night. Lester Flatt said, "It wasn't anything to ride two or three days in a car. We didn't have buses like we do now, and we never had our shoes off". The self-imposed rule was to always get back in time to play the Grand Ole Opry in Nashville each Saturday night. Scruggs said of Monroe that "Bill would never let the music go down no matter how tired we were. If a man would slack off, he would move over and get that mandolin up close on him and get him back up there". Despite the group's success, Scruggs decided the demands were too great. He was single at the time, and the brief few hours on Saturdays that he made it home, it was just to pack his suitcase at the Tulane Hotel where he lived alone, then repeat the cycle—he had done this for two years. He turned in his resignation, planning to go take care of his mother in North Carolina. Flatt had also made up his mind to leave, but he had not told anyone. He later gave his two-week notice, but, before the notice was up, the bass player Howard Watts announced that he was leaving too. Despite Monroe's pleading, they left the band. Monroe thought Flatt and Scruggs had a secret understanding, but both men denied it. Monroe did not speak to either one for 20 years thereafter, a feud well known in country music circles.

== Flatt and Scruggs ==

In 1948, Lester Flatt and Earl Scruggs formed the duo Flatt and Scruggs and chose the name "the Foggy Mountain Boys" for their backing band. The name came from a song by the Carter Family called "Foggy Mountain Top" that the band used as a theme song at the time. Flatt later acknowledged that they consciously tried to make their sound different from Monroe's group. In the spring of 1949, their second Mercury recording session yielded the classic "Foggy Mountain Breakdown", released on 78 rpm phonograph records that were in use at the time. In the mid-1950s, they dropped the mandolin and added a Dobro, played by Buck "Uncle Josh" Graves. Previously, Scruggs had performed something similar, called "Bluegrass Breakdown" with Bill Monroe, but Monroe had denied him songwriting credit for it. Later, Scruggs changed the song, adding a minor chord, thus creating "Foggy Mountain Breakdown".

"Foggy Mountain Breakdown"

The song contains a musical oddity: Flatt plays an E major chord against Scruggs's E minor. When asked about the dissonance years later, Scruggs said he had tried to get Flatt to consistently play a minor there to no avail; he said he eventually became used to the sound and even fond of it. The song won a Grammy and became an anthem for many banjo players to attempt to master. The band routinely tuned its instruments a half-step higher than standard tuning in those days to get more brightness or pop to the sound, returning to standard pitch in the 1960s.

The popularity of "Foggy Mountain Breakdown" resurged years later when it was featured in the 1967 film Bonnie and Clyde, which introduced the song to a younger generation of fans. Scruggs received a phone call from the show's producer and star, Warren Beatty, first asking Scruggs to write a song for the movie. Soon Beatty called back saying that he wanted to use the existing vintage Mercury recording of "Foggy Mountain Breakdown", and rejected the argument that it was recorded 18 years prior at a radio station with no modern enhancements. The film was a hit, called by the Los Angeles Times "a landmark film that helped usher in a new era in American filmmaking". In 2005, the song was selected for the Library of Congress's National Recording Registry of works of unusual merit.

In October 1951, the band recorded "Earl's Breakdown" which featured a technique where Scruggs would manually de-tune the second and third strings of the banjo during a song using a cam device he had made to attach to the instrument, giving the surprise effect of a downward string bend. He and his brother Horace had experimented with it when they were growing up. Scruggs had drilled some holes in the peghead of his banjo to install the device and chipped the pearl inlay. He covered the holes with a piece of metal, which can be seen on the album cover of Foggy Mountain Jamboree. The technique became popular and led to improvement of the design (without drilling holes) by Bill Keith who then manufactured Scruggs-Keith Tuners. The original tuners Scruggs made and used are now in a museum display at the Earl Scruggs Center in Shelby, North Carolina.

In 1953, Martha White Foods sponsored the band's regular early morning radio shows on WSM in Nashville, where the duo sang the company's catchy bluegrass jingle written by Pat Twitty. About this time, country music television shows, on which Flatt and Scruggs appeared regularly, went into syndication, vastly increasing the group's exposure. Despite the group's increasing popularity and fan mail, WSM did not allow Flatt and Scruggs to become members of the Grand Ole Opry at first. According to Tennessean writer Peter Cooper, Bill Monroe was in opposition and worked behind the scenes to keep Flatt and Scruggs off the Opry to the extent of having petitions made against their membership. In 1955 Martha White Foods' CEO Cohen E. Williams intervened by threatening to pull all of his advertising from WSM unless the band appeared on the Opry in the segment sponsored by his company. As years went by, the band became synonymous with Martha White to the extent that the advertising jingle became a hit, and the band rarely played a concert without it. Fans shouted requests for them to play it, even at Carnegie Hall.

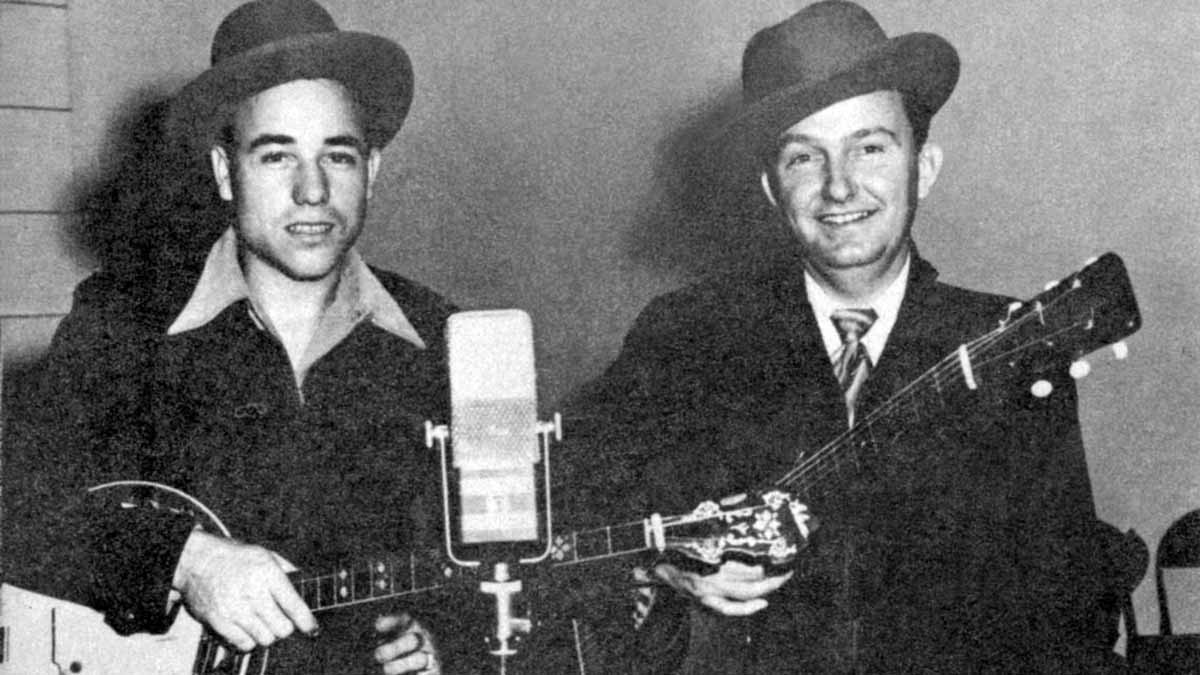
Scruggs (left) in 1949

On September 24, 1962, the duo recorded "The Ballad of Jed Clampett" for the TV show The Beverly Hillbillies. Sung by Jerry Scoggins, the theme song became an immediate country music hit and was played at the beginning and end of each episode of the series. The song went to number one on the Billboard country chart, a first for any bluegrass recording. The song spent 20 weeks on that chart; it also reached number 44 on Billboard's pop chart. The television show was also a huge hit, broadcast in 76 countries around the world. In Queens, New York a five-year-old boy named Béla Fleck heard the Jed Clampett theme on television. Fleck said, "I couldn't breathe or think; I was completely mesmerized." He said it awakened a deeply embedded predisposition that "was just in there" to learn how to play the banjo. Flatt and Scruggs appeared in several episodes as family friends of the fictional Clampetts. In their first appearance (season 1, episode 20), they portray themselves in the show and perform both the theme song and "Pearl, Pearl, Pearl". That song went to number eight on the country chart in 1963. Scruggs published an instruction book entitled "Earl Scruggs and the Five String Banjo" in 1968. It received a Gold Book Award by the publisher Peer-Southern Corporation when it sold over a million copies. Over their 20-year association, Flatt and Scruggs recorded over 50 albums and 75 single records and featured over 20 different musicians as "Foggy Mountain Boys"—side men backing the duo.

By the end of the 1960s, Scruggs was getting bored with repetition of the classic bluegrass fare. By now, his sons were professional musicians, and he was caught up in their enthusiasm for more contemporary music. He said, "I love bluegrass music, and still like to play it, but I do like to mix in some other music for my own personal satisfaction, because if I don't, I can get a little bogged down and a little depressed". Scruggs also wanted to play concerts in venues that normally featured rock and roll acts. Columbia Records executives told Flatt and Scruggs that they intended to try a new producer, Bob Johnston, instead of their long-time producer Don Law. Johnston had produced Bob Dylan's records. This new association produced Changin' Times, Nashville Airplane, and The Story of Bonnie and Clyde albums. Flatt was not happy with some of this material—he did not like singing Bob Dylan songs and refused to perform them, saying "I can't sing Bob Dylan stuff, I mean. Columbia has got Bob Dylan, why did they want me?". Even the success of the Bonnie and Clyde album was not enough to prevent their breakup in 1969. After the split, Flatt formed a traditional bluegrass group with Curly Seckler and Marty Stuart called The Nashville Grass, and Scruggs formed the Earl Scruggs Revue with his sons.

Neither Flatt nor Scruggs spoke to each other for the next ten years—until 1979 when Flatt was in the hospital. Scruggs made an unannounced visit to his bedside. The two men talked for more than an hour. Even though Flatt's voice was barely above a whisper, he spoke of a reunion. Scruggs answered yes, but told Flatt they would talk when he was better. Flatt said, "It came as quite a surprise and made me feel good." However, Flatt never recovered and died May 11, 1979. Historian Barry Willis, speaking of the meeting, said "Earl gave Lester his flowers while he was still living." (He was referring to a 1957 Flatt and Scruggs recording of "Give Me My Flowers While I'm Still Living".)

== Earl Scruggs Revue ==
In early 1969, Scruggs formed the Earl Scruggs Revue, consisting of two of his sons, Randy (guitar) and Gary (bass) and later Vassar Clements (fiddle), Josh Graves (Dobro) and Scruggs's youngest son, Steve (drums). On November 15, 1969, Scruggs performed live with the newly formed group on an open-air stage in Washington, D.C. at the Moratorium to End the War in Vietnam. Scruggs was one of the few bluegrass or country artists to give support to the anti-war movement. The Earl Scruggs Revue gained popularity on college campuses, live shows and festivals and appeared on the bill with acts like Steppenwolf, The Byrds and James Taylor. They recorded for Columbia Records and made frequent network television appearances though the 1970s. Their album I Saw the Light with a Little Help from my Friends featured Linda Ronstadt, Arlo Guthrie, Tracy Nelson, and the Nitty Gritty Dirt Band. This collaboration sparked enthusiasm by the latter to make the album Will the Circle be Unbroken. Earl and Louise Scruggs made phone calls to eminent country stars like Roy Acuff and "Mother" Maybelle Carter to get them to participate in this project to bring a unique combination of older players with young ones. Bill Monroe refused to participate saying he had to remain true to the style he pioneered, and this "is not bluegrass" The album became a classic, and was selected for the Library of Congress' National Recording Registry of works of unusual merit.

Scruggs had to retire from the road in 1980 because of back problems, but the Earl Scruggs Revue did not part ways until 1982. Despite the group's commercial success, they were never embraced by bluegrass or country music purists. Scruggs remained active musically and released The Storyteller and the Banjoman with Tom T. Hall in 1982, and a compilation album Top of the World in 1983. In 1994, Scruggs teamed up with Randy Scruggs and Doc Watson to contribute the song "Keep on the Sunny Side" to the AIDS benefit album Red Hot + Country. In 2001, Scruggs broke a 17-year personal album hiatus with the album Earl Scruggs and Friends, featuring Elton John, Sting, Don Henley, Johnny Cash, Dwight Yoakam, Billy Bob Thornton, and Steve Martin. It includes the song "Passin' Thru", written by Johnny Cash and Randy Scruggs. He also released a live album The Three Pickers with Doc Watson and Ricky Skaggs, recorded in Winston-Salem in December 2002.

== Awards and honors ==
- In 1989, Scruggs was awarded a National Heritage Fellowship given by the National Endowment for the Arts, the highest honor in the folk and traditional arts in the United States.
- Flatt and Scruggs were inducted together into the Country Music Hall of Fame in 1985.
- Scruggs was an inaugural inductee into the International Bluegrass Music Hall of Fame in 1991 and into the North Carolina Music Hall of Fame in 2009.
- In 1992, he was one of 13 recipients to be awarded the National Medal of Arts. The award is authorized by Congress for outstanding contributions to the arts in the United States and presented by the President of the United States.
- Flatt and Scruggs won a Grammy Award in 1968 for Scruggs's instrumental "Foggy Mountain Breakdown". Scruggs won a second Grammy in 2001 for the same song featuring artists Steve Martin, Vince Gill, Albert Lee, Paul Shaffer, Leon Russell, Marty Stuart, Jerry Douglas, Glen Duncan and Scruggs's two oldest sons, Randy and Gary. He totaled four Grammy awards over his career and in 2008 received the Lifetime Achievement Award at the 50th Annual Grammy Awards.
- On February 13, 2003, Scruggs received a star on the Hollywood Walk of Fame.
- That same year, he and Flatt were ranked number 24 on CMT's 40 Greatest Men of Country Music.
- In 2005, Scruggs was awarded an honorary doctorate from Boston's Berklee College of Music.
- In January 1973, a tribute concert honoring Scruggs was held in Manhattan, Kansas featuring artists Joan Baez, David Bromberg, The Byrds, Ramblin' Jack Elliott, Nitty Gritty Dirt Band, and Doc and Merle Watson. The concert was filmed and turned into the 1975 documentary film called Banjoman. It premiered at the John F. Kennedy Center, attended by Tennessee senators Bill Brock and Howard Baker, Ethel Kennedy, and Maria Shriver. Scruggs attended the event in a wheelchair, recuperating from a crash of his private plane.
- The Coen brothers made a reference to The Foggy Mountain Boys in the 2000 film, O Brother, Where Art Thou?, by naming the movie band "The Soggy Bottom Boys"
- On September 13, 2006, Scruggs was honored at Turner Field in Atlanta as part of the pre-game show for an Atlanta Braves home game. Organizers won a listing in "The Guinness Book of World Records" for the most banjo players (239) playing one tune together (Scruggs's "Foggy Mountain Breakdown"). The pickers formed two groups, one on each side of home plate, and a video tribute to Scruggs's life was shown.
- Four works by Scruggs have been placed in the Grammy Hall of Fame: "Foggy Mountain Breakdown" (single, inducted 1999); Foggy Mountain Jamboree, (album, inducted 2012); Foggy Mountain Banjo, (album, inducted 2013); and Bill Monroe's "Blue Moon of Kentucky" (single, inducted 1998) on which Scruggs performed. The award was established by The Recording Academy in 1973 to honor works at least 25 years old that have lasting qualitative or historical significance.
- The Google Doodle of January 11, 2019, paid homage to Scruggs by featuring a "close-up" animated demonstration of the "Scruggs style".

== Banjos ==
In the late 1950s Scruggs met with Bill Nelson, one of the owners of the Vega Musical Instrument Company in Boston, to sign a contract to design and endorse a new banjo to be called "The Earl Scruggs Model". The company had made banjos since before 1912 and already had a Pete Seeger model. There would be four Scruggs models in the top-of-the-line banjos they produced. It was the first time a prominent bluegrass banjo player had played any brand other than a Gibson. Scruggs participated in Vega's marketing campaign that claimed that the banjo was constructed to Scruggs's design specifications, which was true, but the finished product fell short of his expectations. According to Scruggs's friend and fellow banjoist, Curtis McPeake, Scruggs never cared for it. McPeake stated, "They were good banjos, they just wasn't [sic] what Earl wanted to play." Scruggs continued to perform and record using his Gibson Granada. The Vega company was sold to the C.F. Martin company in 1970, and the contract was dissolved.

In 1984, Gibson produced what Scruggs had wanted—the Gibson "Earl Scruggs Standard", a replica of his personal 1934 Gibson Granada RB Mastertone banjo, number 9584-3. This banjo had been changed over its long existence and the only remaining original parts were the rim, the tone ring and the resonator (the wooden back of the instrument). The banjo was originally gold-plated, but the gold had long-since worn off and had been replaced with nickel hardware. Gibson elected to make the replica model nickel-plated as well, to look like Scruggs's own. Scruggs's actual 1934 model was previously owned by a series of influential players beginning with Snuffy Jenkins, who bought it for $37.50 at a pawn shop in South Carolina. Jenkins sold it to Don Reno, who sold it to Scruggs. When Scruggs acquired it, the instrument was in poor condition and he sent it to the Gibson Company for refurbishing, including a new fingerboard, pearl inlays, and a more slender neck. During this time Scruggs used his Gibson RB-3 for some of the Mercury recording sessions. Banjo enthusiasts have located the shipping records from Gibson to determine the exact dates the Granada Mastertone was missing on certain recordings.

On May 22, 2023, Scruggs's personal Gibson Granada Mastertone, heard on "Foggy Mountain Breakdown", was donated by the family to the Country Music Hall of Fame and Museum to become part of the permanent collection. A ceremony to celebrate the gift was attended by a host of bluegrass, Americana, and country music stars.

== Louise Scruggs ==
On December 14, 1946, 19-year-old Anne Louise Certain attended the Grand Ole Opry in Nashville. She went backstage after the performance to meet some of the performers, including Scruggs, who had been with Bill Monroe's band about a year at that time. Scruggs and Certain began dating and fell in love. They were married about a year and a half later in April 1948. When Flatt and Scruggs formed the new group, Scruggs had done most of the bookings for the band, but being on the road for hours in a car and stopping at a phone booth to communicate with venues, often at odd hours, was difficult. Louise had a business aptitude and began helping by doing the phone work. She eventually became the booking agent and ultimately the group's manager, Nashville's first woman to become prominent in that role. Her acumen and skills in the job were prescient. She turned the band into TV personalities and helped propel them into what today would be called rock stars, touring with Joan Baez and performing at the prestigious Newport Folk Festival. She recruited noted artist Thomas B. Allen, who had done covers for The New Yorker and Sports Illustrated, to create cover illustrations for 17 of the group's albums. She helped market the group to younger audiences at college campuses and arranged a live album to be recorded at Carnegie Hall. Earl Scruggs said, "What talent I had never would have peaked without her. She helped shape music up as a business, instead of just people out picking and grinning." Louise died from complications of respiratory disease on February 2, 2006, at age 78, six years before her husband. In 2007, The Country Music Hall of Fame created The Louise Scruggs Memorial Forum, an annual event to honor a music industry business leader.

== Personal life ==
In 1955, Scruggs received word that his mother, Lula, had suffered a stroke and heart attack in North Carolina. The only flight available from Nashville involved such a series of connecting cities that it was not feasible to fly. Scruggs and his wife, with sons Gary and Randy, decided to drive all night from Nashville to see her when they were involved in an automobile accident just east of Knoxville about 3 a.m. October 2. Their car was hit by a drunk driver, a Fort Campbell soldier who had pulled out from a side road into their path, then fled the scene after the collision. The children were not hurt, but Earl suffered a fractured pelvis and dislocations of both hips, which would plague him for years, and Louise had been thrown into the windshield, receiving multiple lacerations. They were flown to a Nashville hospital where Scruggs remained hospitalized for about two months. He received thousands of letters from well-wishers. He returned to music in January 1956, about four months after the injury, but after working a week or so, one of the hips collapsed, and he returned to the hospital for a metal hip to be implanted. Seven years later, the other hip required similar surgery. The first metal hip lasted for some 40 years, but eventually failed, requiring a total hip replacement in October 1996, when he was age 72. While still in the recovery room after this hip operation, Scruggs suffered a heart attack; he was returned to the operating room later the same day for quintuple coronary bypass surgery. Despite the dire circumstances, he recovered and returned to his musical career.

Scruggs was involved in a solo plane crash in October 1975. He was flying his 1974 Cessna Skyhawk II aircraft home to Nashville around midnight from a performance of the Earl Scruggs Revue in Murray, Kentucky. On his landing approach he was enveloped in dense fog and overshot the runway at Cornelia Fort Airpark in Nashville and the plane flipped over. The automatic crash alert system in the plane did not function, and Scruggs remained without help for five hours. He crawled about 150 feet from the wreckage with a broken ankle, broken nose, and facial lacerations, afraid that the plane might catch fire. His family was driving home from the same concert and was unaware of the crash, but his niece became worried when he did not arrive. She called police at about 4 a.m., and they went to the airport, where they heard Scruggs's cries for help from a field near the runway. He recovered, but was in a wheelchair for a few weeks, including for the premiere of the Scruggs documentary Banjoman at the Kennedy Center.

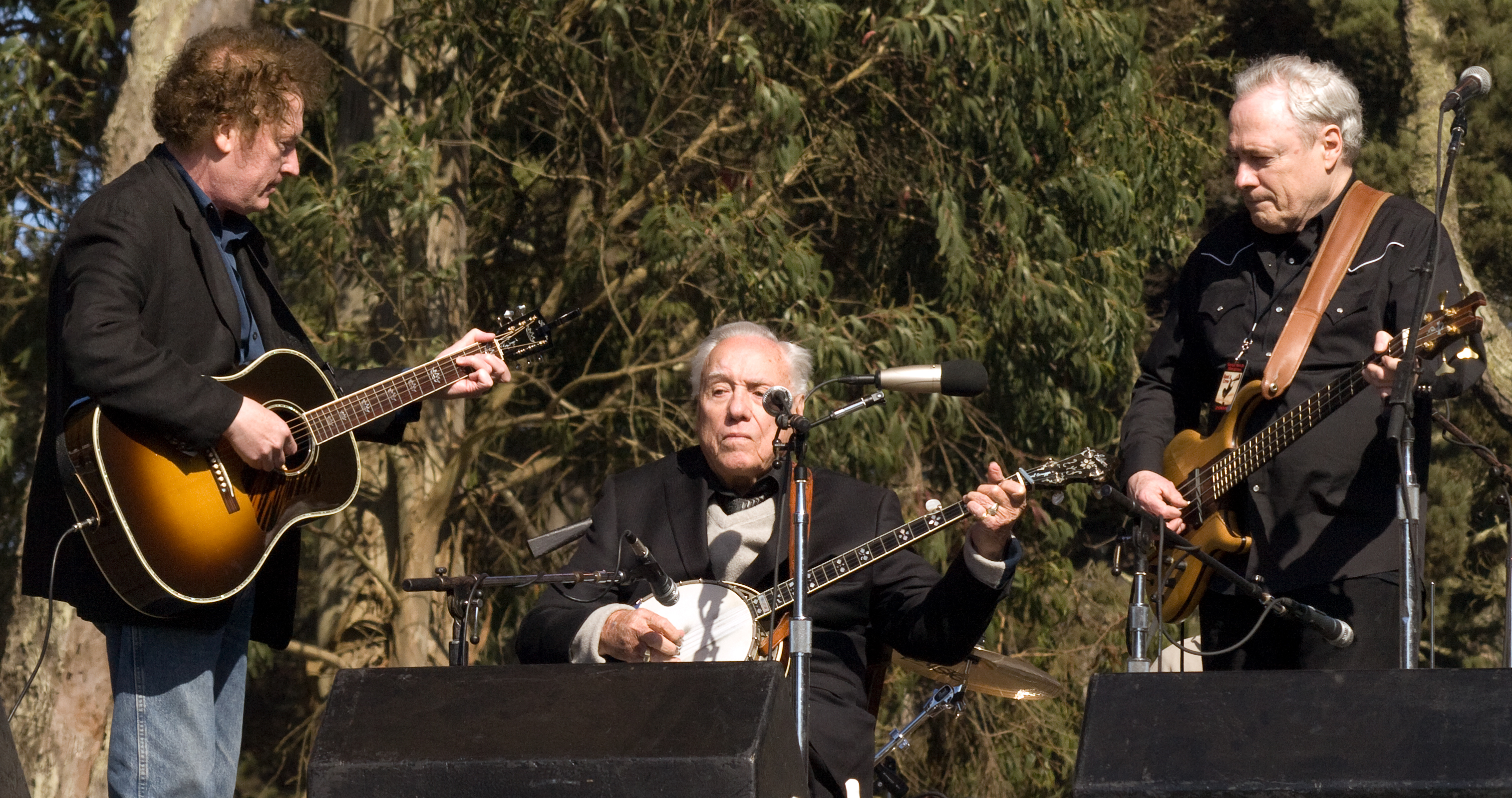
Scruggs performing with his sons Randy and Gary at Hardly Strictly Bluegrass, 2009

Steve Scruggs, Earl's youngest son, was the drummer for the Earl Scruggs Revue at one point. He died in September 1992 of a self-inflicted gun shot after killing his wife, according to prosecutor Dent Moriss. Middle son Randy Scruggs, guitarist and music producer, died after a short illness on April 17, 2018, at the age of 64. Eldest son Gary Scruggs, also a musician, songwriter and music producer, died December 1, 2021, at age 72.

Every January for many years, Scruggs's birthday was celebrated by a party at his home on Franklin Road in Nashville. After a buffet dinner, guests would gather in the living room for an informal "pickin' party" where some of country music's best known stars would sing and play with no one around but family and close friends. The attendees over the years included Tom T. Hall, Béla Fleck, Travis Tritt, Vince Gill, Tim O'Brien, Emmylou Harris, Mac Wiseman, Marty Stuart, Porter Wagoner, Bill Anderson, Jerry Douglas, Josh Graves and many others. At Scruggs's 80th birthday party in 2004, country singer Porter Wagoner said, "Earl is to the five-string banjo what Babe Ruth was to baseball. He is the best there ever was and the best there ever will be."

Scruggs is one of only three celebrities from whom comedian and banjo player Steve Martin has requested an autograph. The other two are chess player Bobby Fischer and entertainer Jerry Lewis.

At age 88, Scruggs died from natural causes on the morning of March 28, 2012, in a Nashville hospital. His funeral was held on Sunday, April 1, 2012, at the Ryman Auditorium in Nashville, Tennessee, and was open to the public. He was buried at Spring Hill Cemetery in a private service.

== The Earl Scruggs Center ==
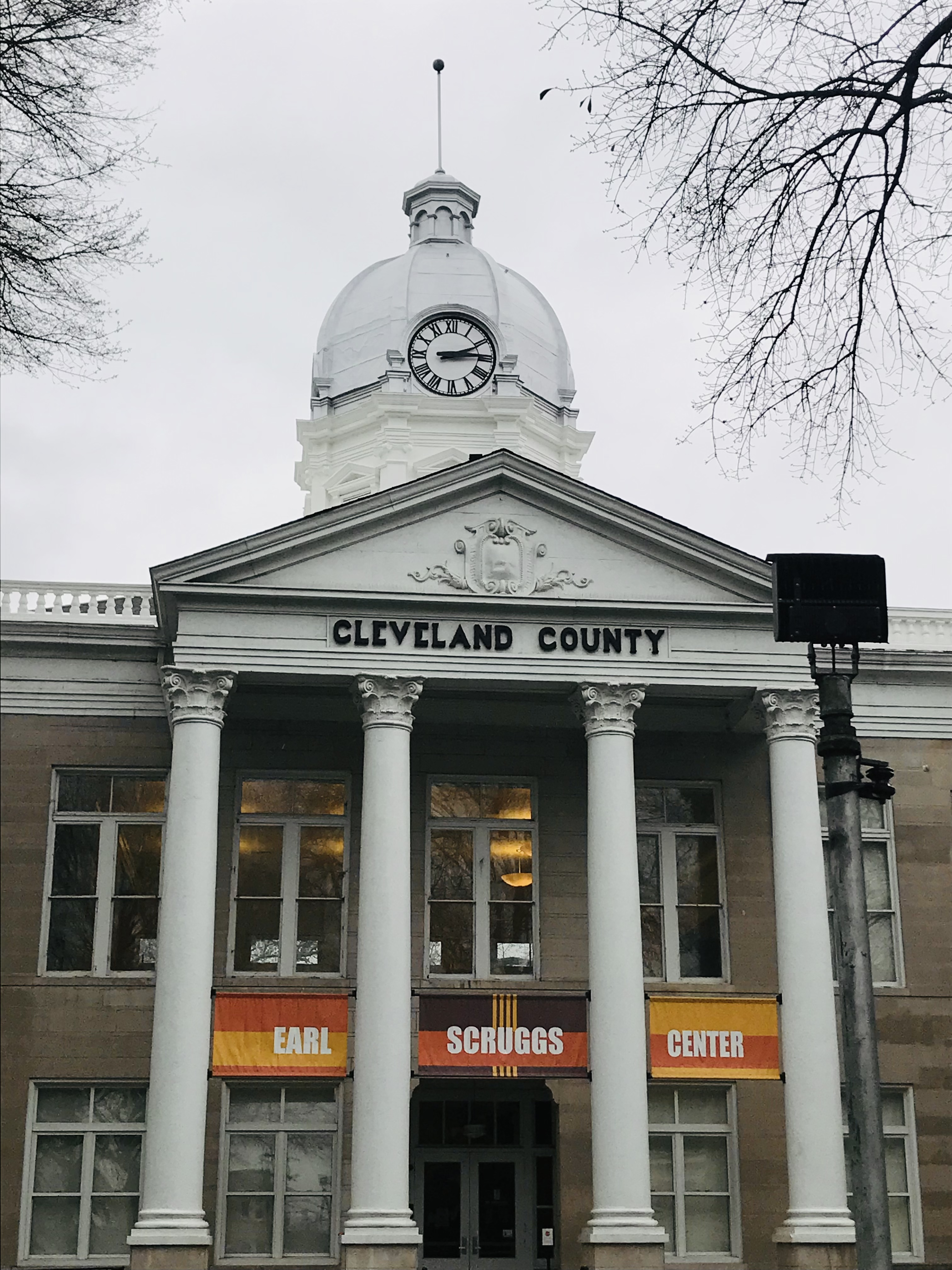
Earl Scruggs Center

The Earl Scruggs Center opened January 11, 2014—a $5.5 million, 100,000 square foot facility located in the court square of Shelby, North Carolina, at the renovated county courthouse. It showcases the musical contributions of Scruggs, the most eminent ambassador of the music of that region, and features a museum and a life-sized statue of Scruggs at a young age. The center received a $1.5 million economic development grant from the U.S. Department of Commerce and also funds from corporate donors. It serves as an educational center providing classes and field trips for students. The opening was celebrated by a sold-out concert by Vince Gill, Travis Tritt, Sam Bush, and others.

On January 6, 2024, on what would have been Scruggs's 100th birthday, a memorial concert was held at Nashville's Ryman Auditorium to benefit the Scruggs Center. At the concert, three dozen noted bluegrass artists, including Jerry Douglas, Béla Fleck, Sam Bush, The Earls of Leicester, Del McCoury, Sierra Hull and Jeff Hanna performed until nearly midnight.

== Selected discography ==
=== Early singles ===
Mercury Records Singles

- 1949: God Loves His Children / I'm Going to Make Heaven My Home
- 1949: We'll Meet Again Sweetheart / My Cabin in Caroline
- 1949: Baby Blue Eyes / Bouquet in Heaven
- 1949: Down the Road / Why Don't You Tell Me So
- 1950: I'll Never Shed Another Tear / I'm Going to Be in Heaven Sometime
- 1950: No Mother or Dad / Foggy Mountain Breakdown
- 1950: Is It Too Late Now / So Happy I'll Be
- 1950: My Little Girl in Tennessee / I'll Never Love Another
- 1951: Cora Is Gone / That Little Old Country Church House
- 1951: Pain in My Heart / Take Me in a Lifeboat
- 1951: Doin' My Time / Farewell Blues
- 1951: Rollin' in My Sweet Baby's Arms / I'll Just Pretend

Columbia Records Singles

- 1951: Come Back Darling / I'm Waiting to Hear You Call Me Darling
- 1951: I'm Head over Heels in Love / We Can't Be Darlings Anymore
- 1951: Jimmie Brown the Newsboy / Somehow Tonight
- 1951: Don't Get Above Your Raising / I've Lost You
- 1951: 'Tis Sweet to Be Remembered / Earl's Breakdown
- 1952: Get in Line Brother / Brother I'm Getting Ready to Go
- 1952: Old Home Town / I'll Stay Around
- 1952: Over the Hills to the Poorhouse
- 1952: I'm Gonna Settle Down / I'm Lonesome and Blue

Mercury Records Singles

- 1952: Pike County Breakdown / Old Salty Dog Blues
- 1952: Preachin' Prayin' Singin' / Will the Roses Bloom
- 1953: Back to the Cross / God Loves His Children

Okeh Records Singles

- 1953: Reunion in Heaven / Pray for the Boys

Columbia Records Singles

- 1953: Why Did You Wander / Thinking about You
- 1953: If I Should Wander Back Tonight / Dear Old Dixie
- 1953: I'm Working on a Road / He Took Your Place
- 1953: I'll Go Stepping Too / Foggy Mountain Chimes
- 1954: Mother Prays Loud in Her Sleep / Be Ready for Tomorrow May Never Come
- 1954: I'd Rather Be Alone / Someone Took My Place with You
- 1954: You're Not a Drop in the Bucket / Foggy Mountain Special
- 1954: 'Till the End of the World Rolls 'Round / Don't This Road Look Rough and Rocky
- 1955: You Can Feel It in Your Soul / Old Fashioned Preacher
- 1955: Before I Met You / I'm Gonna Sleep with One Eye Open
- 1955: Gone Home / Bubbling in My Soul
- 1956: Randy Lynn Rag / On My Mind
- 1956: Joy Bells / Give Mother My Crown
- 1956: What's Good for You / No Doubt about It
- 1957: Six White Horses / Shucking' the Corn
- 1957: Give Me the Flowers While I'm Living / Is There Room for Me
- 1957: Don't Let Your Deal Go Down / Let Those Brown Eyes Smile at Me
- 1957: I Won't Care / I Won't Be Hangin' Around
- 1958: Big Black Train / Crying Alone
- 1958: Heaven / Building on Sand
- 1958: I Don't Care Anymore / Mama's and Daddy's Little Girl
- 1959: A Million Years in Glory / Jesus Savior Pilot Me
- 1959: Cabin on the Hill / Someone You Have Forgotten
- 1959: Crying My Heart Out over You / Foggy Mountain Rock
- 1960: The Great Historical Bum / All I Want Is You
- 1960: Polka on a Banjo / Shucking the Corn (Remake)
- 1960: I Ain't Gonna Work Tomorrow / If I Should Wander Back Tonight
- 1961: Where Will I Shelter My Sheep / Go Home
- 1961: Jimmie Brown the Newsboy / Mother Prays Loud in My Sleep?
- 1962: Cold Cold Lovin' / Just Ain't
- 1962: Hear the Whistle Blow a Hundred Miles / The Legend of the Johnson
- 1962: The Ballad of Jed Clampett / Coal Loadin' Johnny
- 1963: Pearl Pearl Pearl / Hard Travelin'
- 1964: My Saro Jane / You Are My Flower
- 1964: Petticoat Junction / Have You Seen My Dear Companion
- 1964: Workin' It Out / Fireball
- 1964: Little Birdie / Sally Don't You Grieve
- 1965: Father's Table Grace / I Still Miss Someone
- 1965: Go Home / Ballad of Jed Clampett
- 1965: Gonna Have Myself a Ball / Rock Salt and Nails
- 1965: Memphis / Foggy Mountain Breakdown
- 1966: Green Acres / I Had a Dream (With June Carter)
- 1966: Colours / For Lovin' Me
- 1966: The Last Thing on My Mind / Mama You Been on My Mind
- 1967: It Was Only the Wind / Why Can't I Find Myself with You
- 1967: Roust-A-Bout / Nashville Cats
- 1967: The Last Train to Clarksville / California up Tight Band
- 1967: Theme from Bonnie and Clyde (Foggy Mountain Breakdown) / My Cabin in Caroline
- 1967: Down in the Flood / Foggy Mountain Breakdown (Remake)
- 1968: Like a Rolling Stone / I'd Like to Say a Word for Texas
- 1968: I'll Be Your Baby Tonight / Universal Soldier
- 1969: Foggy Mountain Breakdown / Like a Rolling Stone
- 1969: Universal Soldier / Down in the Flood
- 1969: Maggie's Farm / Tonight Will Be Fine

=== Later singles ===
Year	Single	Chart Positions		Album
Year	Single	US Country	CAN Country	Album
1970	"Nashville Skyline Rag"	74	—	Earl Scruggs: His Family and Friends
1979	"I Sure Could Use the Feeling"	30	41	Today & Forever
1979	"Play Me No Sad Songs"	82	66	Today & Forever
1980	"Blue Moon of Kentucky"	46	—	Today & Forever
1982	"There Ain't No Country Music on This Jukebox" (with Tom T. Hall)	77	—	Storyteller and the Banjo Man
1982	"Song of the South" (with Tom T. Hall)	72	—	Storyteller and the Banjo Man

=== Guest singles ===
Year	Single	Artist	Chart Positions	Album
Year	Single	Artist	US Country	Album
1998	"Same Old Train"	Various Artists	59	Tribute to Tradition

=== Music videos ===
Year	Video	Director
1992	"The Dirt Road" (with Sawyer Brown)	Michael Salomon
1998	"Same Old Train" (Various)	Steve Boyle
2001	"Foggy Mountain Breakdown" (Earl Scruggs and Friends)	Gerry Wenner

=== Albums ===
Year	Title	Chart Positions			
Year	Title	US Country	US	US Heat	US Bluegrass
1957	Foggy Mountain Jamboree				
1959	Lester Flatt and Earl Scruggs with the Foggy Mountain Boys				
1961	Foggy Mountain Banjo				
1963	I Saw the Light with Some Help from My Friends				
1963	The Ballad of Jed Clampett				
1963	Flatt and Scruggs at Carnegie Hall				
1964	Flatt and Scruggs Live at Vanderbilt University				
1964	The Fabulous Sound of Lester Flatt and Earl Scruggs				
1965	Town and Country				
1966	Flatt and Scruggs Greatest Hits				
1967	Strictly Instrumental (with Lester Flatt and Doc Watson)				
1967	5 String Banjo Instruction Album				
1968	The Story of Bonnie and Clyde (with Lester Flatt and the Foggy Mountain Boys)				
1969	Changin' Times				
1970	Nashville Airplane				
1970	20 All-Time Great Recordings				
1972	I Saw the Light with Some Help from My Friends				
1972	Earl Scruggs: His Family and Friends				
1972	Live at Kansas State	20	204		
1973	Rockin' 'Cross the Country	46			
1973	Dueling Banjos		202		
1973	The Earl Scruggs Revue		169		
1975	Anniversary Special		104		
1976	The Earl Scruggs Revue 2		161		
1976	Family Portrait	49			
1977	Live from Austin City Limits	49			
1977	Strike Anywhere				
1978	Bold & New	50			
1979	Today & Forever				
1982	Storyteller and the Banjo Man (with Tom T. Hall)				
1982	Flatt & Scruggs				
1983	Top of the World				
1984	The Mercury Sessions 1				
1984	The Mercury Sessions 2				
1984	Superjammin'				
1987	The Golden Hits				
1992	The Complete Mercury Sessions				
1998	Artist's Choice: The Best Tracks (1970–1980)				
2001	Earl Scruggs and Friends	39		33	14
2002	Classic Bluegrass Live: 1959–1966				
2003	Three Pickers (with Doc Watson and Ricky Skaggs)	24	179		2
2004	The Essential Earl Scruggs				
2005	Live with Donnie Allen and Friends				
2007	Lifetimes: Lewis, Scruggs, and Long				

== DVDs ==
=== Earl Scruggs ===
- Earl Scruggs—His Family and Friends (2005)
  (Recorded 1969. Bob Dylan, The Byrds, Bill Monroe, Joan Baez et al.)
- Private Sessions (2005)
- The Bluegrass Legend (2006)

=== Earl Scruggs, Doc Watson and Ricky Skaggs ===
- The Three Pickers (2003)

=== Flatt and Scruggs ===
- The Best of Flatt and Scruggs TV Show Vol. 1 (2007)
- The Best of Flatt and Scruggs TV Show Vol. 2 (2007)
- The Best of Flatt and Scruggs TV Show Vol. 3 (2007)
- The Best of Flatt and Scruggs TV Show Vol. 4 (2007)
- The Best of Flatt and Scruggs TV Show Vol. 5 (2008)
- The Best of Flatt and Scruggs TV Show Vol. 6 (2008)
- The Best of Flatt and Scruggs TV Show Vol. 7 (2009)
- The Best of Flatt and Scruggs TV Show Vol. 8 (2009)
- The Best of Flatt and Scruggs TV Show Vol. 9 (2010)
- The Best of Flatt and Scruggs TV Show Vol. 10 (2010)
