= List of train songs =

"The Carrollton March"
- March by Arthur Clifton
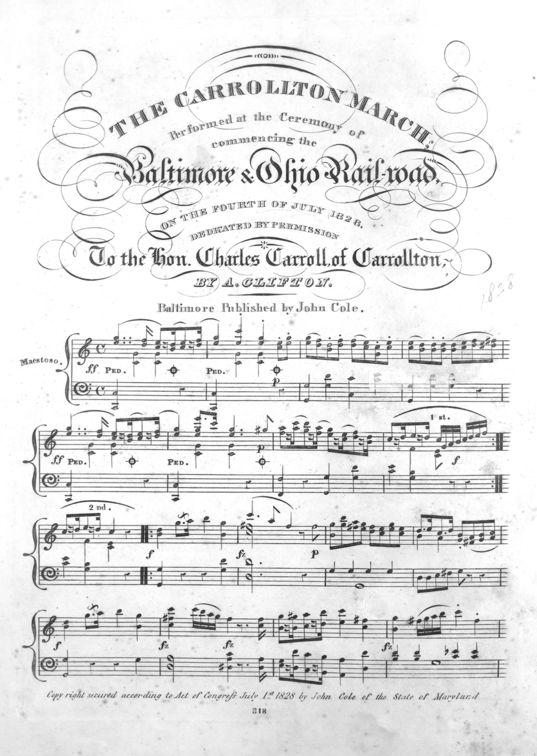
- Sheet music for the first known train song
- Occasion: Commemoration of the groundbreaking for the Baltimore and Ohio Railroad
- Published: July 1, 1828: U.S.

A train song is a song referencing passenger or freight railroads, often using a syncopated beat resembling the sound of train wheels over train tracks. Trains have been a theme in both traditional and popular music since the first half of the 19th century and over the years have appeared in nearly all musical genres, including folk, blues, country, rock, jazz, world, classical and avant-garde. While the prominence of railroads in the United States has faded in recent decades, the train endures as a common image in popular song.

The earliest known train songs date to two years before the first public railway began operating in the United States. "The Carrollton March", copyrighted July 1, 1828, was composed by Arthur Clifton to commemorate the groundbreaking of the Baltimore and Ohio Railroad. Another song written for the occasion, "Rail Road March" by Charles Meineke, was copyrighted two days after Clifton's, one day before the July 4 ceremonies. The number of train songs that have appeared since then is impossible to determine, not only because of the difficulties in documenting the songs but also in defining the genre.

Following is a list of nearly 800 songs by artists worldwide, alphabetized by song title. Most have appeared on commercially released albums and singles and are notable for either their composers, the musicians who performed them, or their place in the history of the form. Besides recorded works, the list includes songs that preceded the first wax cylinder records of the late 1800s and were published as either broadsides or sheet music.

Top 0–9 A B C D E F G H I J K L M N O P Q R S T U V W Y Z External Links

== 0–9 ==
- "16.88" (Hayden Thompson)
- "2:10 Train" (Tom Campbell/Linda Albertano) by Chesapeake, the Fenians, Jimmy Gaudreau & Moondi Klein, Steve Gillette, Carolyn Hester, Taj Mahal, Rising Sons, Linda Ronstadt and Stone Poneys
- "2:15" (John Philip Sousa), copyright 1889
- "2:19" (Tom Waits, Kathleen Brennan) by Jerry Douglas, Tom Waits
- "2:19 Blues (Mamie's Blues)" (Mamie Desdunes) by Louis Armstrong, Jeff Barnhart, Acker Bilk, Canadian Brass, Ken Colyer, Karen Dalton, Art Hodes, Papa Bue Jensen, Bunk Johnson, Jo Ann Kelly, Cy Laurie, George Lewis, Paul Lingle, Jelly Roll Morton, Leon Redbone, Dave Van Ronk, Eric Von Schmidt and Rolf Cahn
- "219 Train" (Harvey Fuqua) by the Moonglows
- "The 3:10 to Yuma" (George Dunning, Ned Washington) by Sandy Denny, Frankie Laine
- "30 Miles of Railroad Track" (Burt Bacharach, Bob Hilliard) by Hammond Brothers
- "5:15 (The Angels Have Gone)" (Pete Townshend) by David Bowie, the Who (from Quadrophenia, 1973)
- "5:15" (Chris Isaak) by Chris Isaak
- "500 Miles" (Hedy West) by Bill Anderson, Chet Atkins, Hoyt Axton, Bad Astronaut, Bobby Bare, Eric Bibb, Leon Bibb, Bob the Builder, the Brothers Four, Glen Campbell, Rosanne Cash, Nick Cave & the Bad Seeds, Celtic Thunder, the Country Gentlemen, Jackie DeShannon, Lonnie Donegan, John Duffey, Cliff Eberhardt, Percy Faith, Jimmy Gilmer, the Hooters, the Innocence Mission, the Journeymen, the Kingston Trio, Los Mustang, Laura Love, Arthur Lyman, Waldemar Matuška, Reba McEntire, Chad Mitchell Trio, Bill Perry, Peter and Gordon, Peter, Paul and Mary, Elvis Presley, Zé Renato and Cláudio Nucci, Johnny Rivers, the Seekers, the Seldom Scene, Judee Sill, Terrance Simien, Joe Simon, Sonny & Cher, Billy Strange, the Tokens, Mary Travers, McCoy Tyner and Marc Ribot, Unit 4 + 2, Johnny Ventura, Gene Vincent, Jimmy Vivino, Hedy West, Roger Whittaker, Mike Wilhelm, Foy Willing and Riders of the Purple Sage, Peter Yarrow
- "8:05" (Don Stevenson, Jerry Miller) by Moby Grape
- "9 to 5 (Morning Train)" by Sheena Easton
- "900 Miles" (Traditional) by Bethany and Rufus, Fiddlin' John Carson, Doris Day, Barbara Dane, Dion, Bob Dylan, the Easy Riders, Ramblin' Jack Elliott, John Fahey, Adam Faith, Terry Gilkyson, Woody Guthrie, Richie Havens, Cisco Houston, Bert Jansch and John Renbourn, Roger McGuinn, the New Christy Minstrels, Nina & Frederik, Odetta, Esther Ofarim, Reptile Palace Orchestra, Pete Seeger and Mike Seeger, Show of Hands, Red Smiley, Town Criers, the Weavers, Wally Whyton, Glenn Yarbrough

== A ==
- "A Tunnel Called Time" by Hoboes [CZ], 1977
- "Across the Track Blues" (Duke Ellington) by Duke Ellington
- "Ain't No Brakeman" (Fontaine Brown) by John Mayall & the Bluesbreakers, Coco Montoya
- "Alabamy Bound", see "I'm Alabama Bound"
- "All Aboard" (Muddy Waters) by Chuck Berry, Terry Garland, Muddy Waters. Other songs with this title, artists followed by composers: Nat King Cole (Nat King Cole), the Five Blind Boys of Mississippi (Archie Brownlee), the Kinks (Ray Davies), Wynton Marsalis (Wynton Marsalis), Del McCoury (Bradley Rodgers, Charley Stefl, Eugene P. Ellsworth), Allison Moorer (Allison Moorer, Doyle Lee Primm), Jimmy Mundy (Jimmy Mundy), Sly & Robbie (Warrick Lyn)
- "All Aboard for Dreamland" (Andrew B. Sterling, Gussie L. Davis), sheet music published 1904
- "All Down the Line" (Mick Jagger, Keith Richards) by the Rolling Stones
- "All Night Train", separate songs, artists followed by composers: The Allman Brothers Band (Gregg Allman, Warren Haynes, Chuck Leavell), New Grass Revival (Steven Briner, Sam Bush), Percy Sledge (unlisted)
- "Angels Met Him at the Gate" (A. W. French, C. M. Currier), commemorates death of gospel singer and hymn-writer Philip Bliss in 1876 train wreck in Ohio
- "Anniversary Blue Yodel" see "Blue Yodel No. 7"
- "Another Journey by Train" (Simon Gallup, Matthieu Hartley, Robert Smith, Lol Tolhurst) by the Cure
- "Another Town, Another Train" (Benny Andersson, Björn Ulvaeus) by ABBA
- "Another Train" (Pete Morton) by Artisan, Sally Barker, Pete Morton, the Poozies. Other songs with this title, artists followed by composers: Mary Gauthier Will Kimbrough (Gwil Owen, Will Kimbrough); Ian McCulloch (Ian McCulloch)
- "Another Train Coming" (Ronald White, William "Mickey" Stevenson) by Kim Weston
- "Are Ye Right There, Michael" (Percy French) by Brendan O'Dowda, Sean Ryan
- "Are You Lonely for Me" (Bert Berns) by Hank Ballard, the Commitments, Grateful Dead, Al Green, Chuck Jackson, Steve Marriott, Otis Redding and Carla Thomas, Freddie Scott
- "Asleep at the Switch" (Charles Shackford), published 1897, by Ernest Stoneman (1926)
- "At the Sound of the Signal Bell" (Will A. Heelan, Max Dreyfus), sheet music published 1898
- "At the Station" (Joe Vitale, Joe Walsh) by Joe Walsh
- "Atlanta Special, The" (Bukka White) by Bukka White
- "Atlantic Coastal Line, The" (Fred Burch, Mel Tillis) by Lester Flatt and Earl Scruggs, Burl Ives, Charley Pride, Hank Snow
- "Auctioneer (Another Engine)" (Bill Berry, Peter Buck, Mike Mills, Michael Stipe) by R.E.M.
- "Autorail" (Medoune Diallo) by Orchestra Baobab

== B ==
- "B & O Blues", separate songs, artists followed by composers: Bumble Bee Slim (Amos Easton), Big Joe Turner (Big Joe Turner)
- "B & O Blues, No. 2" (Gary Atkinson, Blind Willie McTell) by Blind Willie McTell
- "Back Back Train" (Fred McDowell) by Mississippi Fred McDowell, Aerosmith
- "Back on the Train" (Tom Marshall) by Phish, Toots and the Maytals
- "Back Up Train" (Palmer James, Curtis Rodgers) by Al Green
- "Bad Luck Blues" (Blind Lemon Jefferson) by Blind Lemon Jefferson
- "'Battle Fought on the Shields Railway, The'" Broadside published by W. & T. Fordyce, Newcastle, England, 1839
- "Beat It on Down the Line" (Jesse Fuller) by Jesse Fuller, the Grateful Dead, Mother McCree's Uptown Jug Champions
- "Because He Was Only a Tramp" (Traditional), related to "The Tramp", published c. 1875–1880, by Wyzee Hamilton
- "Ben Dewberry's Final Run" (Andrew Jenkins, 1927) by Johnny Cash, Jerry Douglas, Steve Forbert, Bill Monroe, Jimmie Rodgers, Hank Snow
- "Between Trains", separate songs, artists followed by composers: Auburn Lull (Auburn Lull), Robbie Robertson (Robbie Robertson)
- "Big Bear Train" (Jimmy Yancey) by Jimmy Yancey
- "Big Black Train" (George Sherry) by the Earls of Leicester, Flatt & Scruggs
- "Big Iron Horses" (John Dittrich/Dave Innis/Vince Melamed) performed by Restless Heart, 1992. The co-writer, John Dittrich, who also sang lead on the RCA recording, recalled his childhood in New York State, Avon area, at the Five Arch Bridge, watching steam trains with his grandfather. He was observing the steam trains in the early and mid-1950s, towards the end of the steam era.
- "Big Railroad Blues" (Noah Lewis) by Cannon's Jug Stompers (1928), Grateful Dead
- "Big Train", separate songs, artists followed by composers: Black Country Communion (Glenn Hughes); Booker T. & the MG's, Steve Marriott, Conway Twitty (Al Jackson, Jr., Booker T. Jones, Lewis Steinberg, Steve Cropper); Brave Old World (Alan Bern, Traditional); Michael Pickett (Shawn Kellerman); Mike Watt (Tony Kinman); David Lee Roth (Joey Hunting, Terry Kilgore, David Lee Roth, Preston Sturges)
- "Big Train (from Memphis)" (John Fogerty) by John Fogerty
- "Big Wheels" (Clovis Yarnall) by Hank Snow
- "Bill Groggin's Goat" (Traditional) by Sara Hickman
- "Bill Mason" (Copyrighted by Roy Harvey, from poem by Bret Harte) by Roy Harvey and the North Carolina Ramblers (1927), Charlie Poole and the North Carolina Ramblers (1929)
- "Billy Richardson's Last Ride" (Carson Robison, Cleburne C. Meeks) by Vernon Dalhart (1926)
- "Black Girl" (variation of "The Longest Train"/"In the Pines") by Long John Baldry, Lonnie Donegan, Marianne Faithfull, Clifford Jordan, Journeymen, Lead Belly, Nirvana ("Where Did You Sleep Last Night?"), Pete Seeger, Josh White
- "Black Train" (Phil Collen) by Def Leppard
- "Black Train" (Jeffrey Lee Pierce) by The Gun Club
- "Black Train Blues, The" (Bukka White) by Bukka White
- "Black Train Song" (The Doors, Junior Parker, Sam Phillips) by the Doors
- "Blow That Lonesome Whistle, Casey" (Al Dexter) by Al Dexter
- "Blow Yo' Whistle, Freight Train" (Alton and Rabon Delmore) by the Delmore Brothers, Happy and Artie Traum
- "Blue Railroad Train" (Alton Delmore) by the Delmore Brothers, Hot Tuna, Jorma Kaukonen, Geoff and Maria Muldaur, the Tony Rice Unit, Marty Stuart, Merle Travis, Doc Watson, Doc and Merle Watson Additional song with this title written and recorded by Danny Schmidt.
- "Blue Smoke" (Dolly Parton) by Dolly Parton 2014
- "Blue Train" by Johnny Cash, the Nashville Bluegrass Band, Marty Stuart (Billy Smith);
- "Blue Train", separate songs, artists followed by composers: Chet Baker, John Coltrane, Grant Green, GRP All-Star Big Band, Dave Grusin, Conrad Herwig, J. J. Johnson, Byard Lancaster, Archie Shepp Quartet, Kenny Werner, Joe Lee Wilson (John Coltrane); Tripping Daisy (Tim DeLaughter and Tripping Daisy); Kenny Rogers (Pat Donohue); Billy Hancock (Billy Hancock); Antônio Carlos Jobim (Antônio Carlos Jobim, Lô Borges and Ronaldo Bastos); Kevin Johnson (Kevin Johnson); Cibo Matto (Cibo Matto); Jimmy Page and Robert Plant (Charlie Jones, Jimmy Page, Michael K. Lee and Robert Plant); Maura O'Connell, Linda Ronstadt-Emmylou Harris-Dolly Parton (Jennifer Kimball and Tom Kimmel); Asian Kung-Fu Generation (Burū Torein)
- "Blue Train (of the Heartbreak Line)" (John D. Loudermilk) by Pat Boone, Bjøro Håland, Doyle Lawson and Quicksilver, John D. Loudermilk
- "Blues for Dixie" (O.W. Mayo) by Merle Haggard
- "Blues in the Night" (Harold Arlen, Johnny Mercer) by Harold Arlen, Louis Armstrong, Shirley Bassey, Tony Bennett, Cab Calloway, Eva Cassidy, Rosemary Clooney, Bing Crosby, Doris Day, Ella Fitzgerald, Judy Garland, Benny Goodman, Woody Herman, Quincy Jones, Ledisi, Julie London, Jimmie Lunceford, Katie Melua, Johnny Mercer, Artie Shaw, Dinah Shore, Frank Sinatra, Kate Smith, Jo Stafford, Big Joe Turner
- "Boomer's Story" (Carson Robison), see "The Railroad Boomer"
- "Born on a Train" (Stephin Merritt) by The Magnetic Fields
- "Bound for Hell" (David J) by Love and Rockets,
- "Boxcar" (Neil Young) by Neil Young
- "Boxcar Blues" (Boxcar Willie) by Boxcar Willie, Maggie Jones
- "Boxcar's My Home" (Lloene Martin) by Boxcar Willie
- "Boxcars" (Butch Hancock) by Joe Ely, Rosie Flores
- "Brakeman's Blues" (Jimmie Rodgers) by Johnny Cash, Lefty Frizzell, Bill Monroe, Jimmie Rodgers, Hank Snow
- "Brave Engineer, The", three songs with this title: (Fred E. Reynolds), sheet music published 1891; Roy Harvey and North Carolina Ramblers (unknown composer, "The Wreck on the C & O" set to tune of "The Wreck of the Old 97"), 1926; Cisco Houston (Cisco Houston), 1953
- "Bringin' in the Georgia Mail" (Fred Rose) by Norman Blake, Sam Bush, Floyd Cramer, Flatt & Scruggs, Don Gibson, Jim & Jesse, Charlie Monroe, Nashville Grass, Reno and Smiley
- "Broke Down Engine" (Blind Willie McTell) by Spencer Bohren, Peter Case, Cephas & Wiggins, Tony McPhee, Bob Dylan, Paul Geremia, John Hammond, Jr., Ernie Hawkins, Colin Linden, Blind Willie McTell, Buddy Moss, Dave "Snaker" Ray, Sonny Terry and Brownie McGhee, Martin Simpson, Johnny Winter
- "Broken Down Tramp, The" (A. P. Carter, related to "The Tramp") by the Carter Family (1937)
- "Bull Doze Blues" (Henry Thomas) by Henry Thomas
- "Bullet Train" (Glenn Raymond Tipton / Kenneth Downing) by Judas Priest
- "BW Railroad Blues" (Townes Van Zandt) by Townes Van Zandt
- "Bye, Bye Black Smoke Choo Choo" (Don Reno, Arthur "Guitar Boogie" Smith) by Joe Glazer, the New Lost City Ramblers

== C ==
- "C. & O. Blues" by Blind Joe Taggart
- "C. & O. Excursion" by Frank Hutchison
- "C. & O. Whistle by Fruit Jar Guzzlers
- "C. C. & O. Blues" by Pink Anderson & Simmie Dooley
- "C'mon 'N' Ride It (The Train)" (C.C. Lemonhead, Michael Phillips, Jay Ski, B. Whiteby) by Quad City DJs
- "California Zephyr", separate songs, artists followed by composers: Duster Bennett and B.B. King (Duster Bennett); Jay Farrar and Ben Gibbard (Jack Kerouac, Jay Farrar); Larry Sparks, Hank Williams (Hank Williams); Dolly Varden (Steve Dawson)
- "Calling Trains" (Traditional) by Utah Phillips
- "Can't Let Go" (Randy Weeks) by Shemekia Copeland, Lucinda Williams
- "Canadian Pacific" (Ray Griff) by George Hamilton IV, Gordon Lightfoot, Hank Snow
- "Canadian Railroad Trilogy" (Gordon Lightfoot)George Hamilton IV, James Keelaghan, Gordon Lightfoot
- "Cannonball Blues" (Traditional), also known as "Cannonball", "Mr. McKinley" and "Whitehouse Blues", by the Carter Family (1930), June Carter Cash, Vassar Clements, Bill Clifton and Hedy West, John Cohen, the Dillards, Jerry Douglas and Peter Rowan, Flatt & Scruggs, Greenbriar Boys, Woody Guthrie, Cisco Houston, Grandpa Jones, Larry Sparks, Bascom Lamar Lunsford, Wade Mainer, Bill Monroe, Charlie Monroe, Clyde Moody, New Lost City Ramblers, Sonny Osborne, Utah Phillips, Charlie Poole (1926), Riley Puckett (1929), John Renbourn, Reno and Smiley, Peter Rowan, the Seldom Scene, Fiddlin' Arthur Smith, Kilby Snow, Doc Watson
- "Carrollton March, The" (Arthur Clifton), earliest known train song, copyrighted July 1, 1828
- "Casey Jones" (copyrighted by Eddie Newton, T. Lawrence Seibert, attributed to Wallace Saunders) by Sidney Bechet, Fiddlin' John Carson and His Virginia Reelers (1923), Johnny Cash, Arthur Collins and Chorus (1910), James Coffey, Vernon Dalhart, Delmore Brothers, Jerry Garcia Acoustic Band, Mississippi John Hurt, Spike Jones, "Spider John" Koerner, Furry Lewis (1928), Billy Murray and the American Quartet (1910), the New Christy Minstrels, Peerless Quartet (1911), the Sons of the Pioneers, Tex Ritter, Tom Russell, Pete Seeger
- "Casey Jones" (Jerry Garcia, Robert Hunter) by Grateful Dead
- "Casey Jones the Union Scab" by John McCutcheon
- "Casey Jones Was His Name" by Hank Snow
- "Catch That Train", separate songs, artists followed by composers: America (Gerry Beckley, Dewey Bunnell); Lee Emerson (Lee Emerson); John Mayall (John Mayall); Chris Spedding (Chris Spedding); Dan Zanes (Dan Zanes)
- "Charlie on the M.T.A." — see M.T.A. (song)
- "Charming Young Widow I Met on the Train, The" (W. H. Gove), broadside published before 1867
- "Chatsworth Wreck, The" (Thomas P. Westendorf, 1913) by Bucky Halker and Johnsburg 3
- "Chattanooga Choo Choo" (Harry Warren, Mack Gordon) by Beegie Adair, the Andrews Sisters, Ray Anthony, Asleep at the Wheel, BBC Big Band, Tex Beneke, George Benson, John Bunch, Cab Calloway, Caravelli, Regina Carter, Ray Charles, Harry Connick Jr., Ray Conniff, Floyd Cramer, Ernie Fields, Stéphane Grappelli and Marc Fosset, Bill Haley & His Comets, John Hammond Jr., the Harmonizing Four, Harmony Grass, Harpers Bizarre, Ted Heath, Betty Johnson, Susannah McCorkle, Ray McKinley, Big Miller, Glenn Miller and His Orchestra, Carmen Miranda, Richard Perlmutter, Oscar Peterson, Elvis Presley, Spike Robinson, Harry Roy, Jan Savitt, the Shadows, Hank Snow, Teddy Stauffer, Dave Taylor, Claude Thornhill, the Tornados, Tuxedo Junction, Guy Van Duser
- "Chicago Bound Blues" by Ida Cox
- "Chickasaw Train Blues (Low Down Dirty Thing)" (Minnie McCoy) by Memphis Minnie
- "Child of the Railroad Engineer, The", also titled "The Two Lanterns" (Harry V. Neal, Gussie L. Davis, 1898) by G.B. Grayson and Henry Whitter
- "Choo Choo (Gotta Hurry Home)" (Bob Schafer, Dave Ringle, Duke Ellington) by Duke Ellington, first recording (with the Washingtonians), 1924
- "Choo Choo Blues" (Virginians) by Virginians, 1922
- "Choo Choo Boogaloo" (Leib Ostrow) by Buckwheat Zydeco
- "Choo Choo Ch'Boogie" (Denver Darling, Milt Gabler, Vaughn Horton, Louis Jordan) by Asleep at the Wheel, Clarence "Gatemouth" Brown, Chilli Willi & the Red Hot Peppers, Clifton Chenier, Chris Daniels and the Kings, John Denver, Five Guys Named Moe, Foghat, the Four Knights, Bill Haley & the Comets, Quincy Jones, Bert Kaempfert, Louis Jordan, Kid Creole & the Coconuts, B.B. King, Jim Kweskin, the Manhattan Transfer, Charlie McCoy, Lucky Millinder, Kenny Roberts, Walter Roland, Widespread Depression Orchestra, Dan Zanes
- "City of New Orleans" (Steve Goodman) by Johnny Cash, Judy Collins, John Denver, Steve Goodman, Arlo Guthrie, the Limeliters, Willie Nelson, Randy Scruggs, the Seldom Scene, Hank Snow,
- "City To City by Gerry Rafferty
- "Clear the Track" (Jesse Hutchinson, Dan Emmett), published 1844, by Pete Seeger
- "Click Clack" (Don Van Vliet) by Captain Beefheart
- "Click Clack" by Dickey Doo and the Don'ts
- "Clickety Clack (Kalunk Kalunk)" (Traditional) by Cisco Houston
- "Coal Train (Stimela)" (Hugh Masekela) by Hugh Masekela
- "Cole Younger" (Traditional) by Dock Boggs, R.W. Hampton, Mary McCaslin, Michael Martin Murphey
- "Come on to Nashville, Tennessee" (Walter Donaldson), published 1916
- "Conclusion of the Railroad Earth" (Jack Kerouac) by Jack Kerouac with Al Cohn and Zoot Sims
- "Coroner's Footnote, The" (Corien Steenstra, Henny Wassenaar) by Half Man Half Biscuit
- "Country Line Special" (Davies) Cyril Davies and His Rhythm And Blues All Stars
- "C.P.R. (Canadian Pacific Railway) Blues" (Robert Charlebois) by Robert Charlebois
- "Crash at Crush, The" by the Residents
- "Crazy Train" (Ozzy Osbourne, Randy Rhoads, Bob Daisley) by Ozzy Osbourne
- "Crime of the D'Autremont Brothers, The" (Charles Johnson, Paul Johnson) by the Johnson Brothers, 1928
- "Cross the Tracks (We Better Go Back)" (James Brown) by Maceo & the Macks, Soul II Soul
- "Cross-Tie Walker" (John Fogerty) by Creedence Clearwater Revival
- "Crush, TX" by Red Rum Club
- "Crystal Chandeliers and Burgundy" (Jack Routh) by Johnny Cash

== D ==
- "Daddy Was a Railroad Man" (Boxcar Willie) by Boxcar Willie
- "Daddy, What's a Train?" (Utah Phillips) by John Denver, Joe Glazer, Utah Phillips,
- "Danville Girl" (Traditional) by Joe Glazer, Woody Guthrie
- "Dark Hollow" (Bill Browning, 1958), also recorded as "Dark Holler", derived from "East Virginia Blues", by David Bromberg, Gene Clark, John Cohen, J.D. Crowe, Grateful Dead, Clinton Gregory, David Grisman, Aubrey Haynie, the Kentucky Colonels, Benny Martin, Del McCoury, Bill Monroe, Muleskinner, the New Lost City Ramblers, Jeb Loy Nichols, the Nitty Gritty Dirt Band, the Seldom Scene, Shannon Saunders, Larry Sparks, Ralph Stanley, the String Cheese Incident, Claire Tomlinson, Mac Wiseman, Joe Val, Dwight Yoakam and the Nitty Gritty Dirt Band
- "Daybreak Express" (Duke Ellington) by John Barry, Duke Ellington
- "De Gospel Train", see "Gospel Train"
- "Death's Black Train Is Comin'" by Rev. J. M. Gates, 1926
- "Death's Train" by Hoboes [CZ], 1968
- "Desperados Waiting for a Train" (Guy Clark) by Bobby Bare, Mark Chesnutt, Guy Clark, David Allan Coe, Jimmie Dale Gilmore, Nanci Griffith, the Highwaymen, Slim Pickens, Tom Rush, Martin Simpson, Jerry Jeff Walker
- "Destination Victoria Station" (Johnny Cash) by Johnny Cash
- "Devil's Train", separate songs, artists followed by composers: Roy Acuff, Cliff Carlisle, Mark Erelli (Cliff Carlisle, Mel Foree); Crooked Fingers (Crooked Fingers); Eric Sardinas (Eric Sardinas)
- "Did He Ever Return?" by Fiddlin' John Carson
- "Die Reise (The Journey)" (Herbert Distel), electro-acoustic composition incorporating tape modulations, wind machines and synthesizers
- "Different Trains" (Steve Reich) by Steve Reich
- "Dixie Flyer", separate songs, artists followed by composers: Gene Clark (Thomas Jefferson Kaye), Lester Flatt (Marty Stuart), Randy Newman (Randy Newman), Muggsy Spanier (Walter Melrose)
- "Dixie Flyer Blues" (Bessie Smith) by Bessie Smith
- "Do the Choo-Choo" (Gamble and Huff) by Archie Bell & the Drells
- "Doggone That Train" (Jimmie Davis) by Jimmie Davis (1930), Hank Snow
- "Don't Miss That Train" (Sister Wynona Carr) by Sister Wynona Carr, Edwin Hawkins, Joe Liggins, Louisiana Red
- "Don't Sleep on the Subway" by Petula Clark
- "Dorion Crossing" (Eldon Rathburn) by Eldon Rathburn
- "Down Bound Train" (Chuck Berry) by Chuck Berry
- "Down by the Railroad Track" (Frank Crumit, Billy Curtis) by Frank Crumit (1930)
- "Down by the Station" (Slim Gaillard) by Perry Como, Four Preps, Harry James
- "Down Home Special" by Bo Diddley
- "Down in the Tube Station at Midnight" (Paul Weller) by the Jam
- "Down There by the Train" (Kathleen Brennan/Tom Waits) by Johnny Cash, Tom Waits
- "Down Where the Cotton Blossoms Grow" (Harry Von Tilzer, Andrew B. Sterling), published 1900
- "Downbound Train" (Bruce Springsteen) by Bruce Springsteen
- "Downtown Train" (Tom Waits) by Courtney Marie Andrews, Mary Chapin Carpenter, Everything but the Girl, Tom Russell Band, Bob Seger, Patty Smyth, Rod Stewart, Tom Waits
- "Draize Train" by the Smiths
- "Draw Your Brakes" by Scotty (reggae vocalist) (Scotty) - featured in the soundtrack to the film The Harder They Come
- "Dream Train" (Charles Newman, Billy Baskette) by Guy Lombardo
- "Drill, Ye Tarriers, Drill" (attributed to Thomas F. Casey & Charles Connelly, published 1888) by Arthur Collins, Richard Dyer-Bennet, the Easy Riders, George J. Gaskin (1896), Bob Gibson, Cisco Houston, Burl Ives, the Limeliters, Frank Luther, Chad Mitchell Trio, Chubby Parker, Peerless Quartet, Dan W. Quinn, Earl Robinson, Len Spencer (1892), Win Stracke, the Tarriers, the Tradewinds, the Weavers
- "Driving the Last Spike" (Tony Banks, Phil Collins, Mike Rutherford) by Genesis
- "Driver 8" (Bill Berry, Michael Stipe, Mike Mills, Peter Buck) by R.E.M.
- "Drug Train", separate songs, artists followed by composers: the Cramps (Lux Interior, Rorscach), Social Distortion (Mike Ness)
- "Dulcimer" (David Mallett) by David Mallett
- "Dummy Line, The" (Unknown, earliest date 1925) by Michael Cooney, Cindy Mangsen and Anne Hills, Joe Hickerson, Session Americana
- "Duquesne, Pennsylvania" by Hank Snow
- "Duquesne Whistle" (Bob Dylan, Robert Hunter) by Bob Dylan
- "Dying Hobo" (Traditional), also titled "Little Stream of Whiskey"; as "Dying Hobo": Jim Glaser, Travis B. Hale and E.J. Derry, Jr. (1927), Kelly Harrell (1926), Roy Harvey and Earl Shirkey (1929), George Lay (1959); as "Little Stream of Whiskey": Norman and Nancy, Dick Burnett and Leonard Rutherford (1926), Doc and Merle Watson

== E ==
- "Easy Rider Blues" (Blind Lemon Jefferson, Joan S. Sommer, Traditional) by Blind Lemon Jefferson
- "East Coast Racer" (Gregory Spawton) by Big Big Train
- "Eastbound Freight Train" (Grandpa Jones) by Grandpa Jones, Jim & Jesse, Reno and Smiley
- "Eastbound Train, The", originally "Going for a Pardon", (James Thornton, Clara Hauenschild, copyright 1896) by Blue Sky Boys (1940), George J. Gaskin (1897), Gibson Brothers (2015), Asa Martin (1928), Riley Puckett (1931), Ernest Stoneman (1928), Dock Walsh (1925), Mac Wiseman (1966)
- "Einstein on the Beach": Act 1, Scene 1 – Train, and Act 2, Scene 2 – Night Train by Philip Glass
- "Eisenbahnballade" (Reinhard Mey) by Reinhard Mey
- "Electric Trains" (Glenn Tilbrook, Chris Difford) by Squeeze
- "Engine 143" (Traditional, related to "F.F.V." and "Wreck on the C & O") by Dave Alvin and the Guilty Men, Joan Baez, the Carter Family, Johnny Cash, the David Grisman Bluegrass Experience, Kossoy Sisters, Ralph Stanley
- "Engine Driver" (Colin Meloy) by the Decemberists
- "Engine Engine #9" (Roger Miller) by Roger Miller
- "Engineer Bill" (Eliza Gilkyson) by Eliza Gilkyson
- "Engineer's Blues" (Walter Davis) by Walter Davis and Roosevelt Sykes (1931)
- "Engineer's Child, The" (Carson Robison), based on "Just Set a Light" (1896) and also titled "Red and Green Signal Lights", by Vernon Dalhart (1926), Hank Snow
- "Evening Train" (Van Morrison) by Van Morrison
- "Evening Train, The" (Hank Williams, Audrey Williams, 1949), also titled "On the Evening Train", by Johnny Cash Molly O'Day
- "Everybody Loves a Train" (David Hidalgo, Louie Pérez) by Los Lobos
- "Express" (Strahil Velchev) by KiNK
- "Express Office, Theg to Us Dead"
- "Express Orient" by Batterie-Fanfare de la Garde Républicaine, 1910
- "Expressman Blues" (James Rachell) by Sleepy John Estes and Yank Rachell (1930)
- "Expresso 2222" (Gilberto Gil) by Gilberto Gil

== F ==
- "F.F.V." (Traditional, also titled "George Alley's F.F.V."), related to "Engine 143" and "Wreck on the C & O", by Flatt & Scruggs, Michael Nesmith, Townes Van Zandt, Doc Watson
- "Fares, Please (The Tram Conductor Girl)" (Bert Lee), copyright 1917
- "Farmer-Labor Train" (Woody Guthrie) by Woody Guthrie
- "Fast Express" (Traditional) by the Delmore Brothers, the Stanley Brothers and the Clinch Mountain Boys
- "Fast Freight" (Terry Gilkyson) by the Easy Riders, Kingston Trio, Serendipity Singers, Ritchie Valens
- "Fast Freight Blues" by Sonny Terry
- "Fast Train Through Arkansas" (Alton Delmore, Rabon Delmore) by the Delmore Brothers, Wayne Raney
- "Fatal Run, The" (Cliff Carlisle) by Cliff Carlisle, 1931
- "Fear of Trains" (Stephin Merritt) by the Magnetic Fields
- "Fireball Mail" (Andrew Jenkins) by Roy Acuff, Flatt & Scruggs, Hank Snow
- "First Train Headin' South" (Johnny Horton) by Jimmy Dean, Johnny Horton, Claude King
- "First Train Home", separate songs, artists followed by composers: Fleetwood Mac (Peter Green), Imogen Heap (Imogen Heap)
- "Flag That Train (to Alabam')" (Lindsay McPhail, Irving Rothschild, Eddie Richmond) by Fred Hamm Orchestra, 1925
- "Flaggin' the Train to Tuscaloosa" (Raymond Scott, Mack David) by Ray McKinley
- "Folsom Prison Blues" (Johnny Cash) by Accessory, Asleep at the Wheel, Chet Atkins, Bobby Bare, Dierks Bentley, Brandi Carlile, Johnny Cash, Roy Clark, Dead Moon, D.O.A., Bob Dylan and the Band, Ramblin' Jack Elliott, the Enid, Everlast, Flatt & Scruggs, Gin Blossoms, Merle Haggard, Hamell on Trial, Slim Harpo, the Reverend Horton Heat, the Highwaymen, Hot Tuna, Ferlin Husky, Waylon Jennings, George Jones, Jerry Lee Lewis, Jamie Lono, Dutch Mason, Jimmy McCracklin, Paul McDonald, the Mekons, Bill Miller, Keb' Mo', Gram Parsons, Minnie Pearl, Carl Perkins, Charley Pride, Jerry Reed, Billy Lee Riley, Brian Setzer, Hank Snow, Ernest Tubb, Conway Twitty, Porter Wagoner, Hank Williams, Jr., the Wood Brothers, Sheb Wooley
- "Fourth Rail" (Fred Frith, Henry Kaiser) by Fred Frith and Henry Kaiser
- "Frankfort Special" (Sherman Edwards, Donald Meyer, Sid Wayne) by Elvis Presley and the Jordanaires
- "Freedom Train", separate songs, artists followed by composers: B'z (Tak Matsumoto), Bing Crosby and the Andrews Sisters (Irving Berlin)
- "Freight Train" (Elizabeth Cotten) by Chet Atkins, Joan Baez, Harry Belafonte, Lenny Breau, Elizabeth Cotten, Ani DiFranco and Preservation Hall Jazz Band, Lonnie Donegan, Rusty Draper, Ramblin' Jack Elliott, Jerry Garcia and David Grisman, Stefan Grossman and Duck Baker, David Holt and Doc Watson, Jim & Jesse, Kruger Brothers, Peter Lang, Jeremy Lyons, Taj Mahal, Buddy Miller, Van Morrison, the Overlanders, Peter and Gordon, Peter, Paul and Mary, Kevin Roth, Mike Seeger, Peggy Seeger and Joe Meek, Pete Seeger, James Alan Shelton, George Shuffler, Trixie Smith, Merle Travis and Joe Maphis, Uncle Earl, Doc Watson and Merle Watson, Nancy Whiskey, Simone White, Mac Wiseman. Additional songs with this title, artists followed by composers: Herb Alpert (John Pisano); Marty Brown (Marty Brown); Kasey Chambers (Kasey Chambers); John Coltrane and Kenn Burrell; Kate Copeland (Kate Copeland); Jack Wilkins (Tommy Flanagan); James Cotton (James Cotton); Fred Eaglesmith, Alan Jackson (Fred Eaglesmith); Jim Eanes (Jim Eanes/Lora Lowry); Hunter Hayes (Hunter Hayes); John Hiatt (John Hiatt); John Lee Hooker (John Lee Hooker); R. Stevie Moore (R. Stevie Moore); Nitro (Michael Angelo/Jim Gillette); Axel Rudi Pell (Axel Rudi Pell); Ralph Peterson, Jr. (Ralph Peterson, Jr.); Doctor Ross (Isaiah Ross); Johnny Shines (Johnny Shines); Sonny Terry and Brownie McGhee (Sonny Terry/Brownie McGhee)
- "Freight Train Blues" (John Lair) by Roy Acuff, Dan Bern, Boxcar Willie, Anita Carter, Dick Curless, Jimmy Dean, Johnny Duncan, Bob Dylan, Ramblin' Jack Elliott, Cathy Fink & Marcy Marxer, Red Foley, Tennessee Ernie Ford, Jack Guthrie, Jack Kingston, Benny Martin, Lynn Morris, Webb Pierce, James Reams, Hans Theessink and Arlo Guthrie, Merle Travis, Doc Watson, Doc and Merle Watson, the Weavers, Hank Williams. Additional songs with this title, artists followed by composers: Lightnin' Hopkins (Lightnin' Hopkins); Mississippi Fred McDowell (unknown); Clara Smith (Clara Smith); Trixie Smith and Sidney Bechet (Thomas A. Dorsey, Clarence Williams)
- "Freight Train Boogie" (Rabon Delmore, Alton Delmore) by Delmore Brothers, Mike Dowling, Red Foley, the Louvin Brothers, Willie Nelson, Don Reno and Red Smiley, Johnny Tyler, Doc Watson, Lightnin' Wells
- "Freight Train from Kyogle" by Darren Hanlon
- "Freight Wreck at Altoona, The", see "Wreck of the 1262"
- "Fremont Train, The" (Traditional), 1856, by Oscar Brand
- "Friendship Train" (Barrett Strong, Norman Whitfield) by Gladys Knight & the Pips
- "Frisco Depot" by Mickey Newbury, 1971.
- "Frisco Road" (Utah Phillips) by Utah Phillips
- "Frisco Train Blues" by Texas Alexander, circa 1928
- "From a Moving Train" (Gerry Beckley) by America
- "Funeral Train" (Rev. J. M. Gates) by Rev. J. M. Gates, 1926

== G ==
- "Gallopin' Goose" (Chip Davis, Bill Fries) by C. W. McCall
- "The Gambler" (Don Schlitz) by Kenny Rogers
- "Gandy Dancer's Ball" (Paul Mason Howard, Paul Weston) by Frankie Laine, the Weavers
- "Gentle on My Mind" (John Hartford) by Glen Campbell, Aretha Franklin
- "Georgia on a Fast Train", single by Billy Joe Shaver."
- "Georgie on the IRT" (Lawrence Block), parody of "Wreck on the C & O", by Dave van Ronk
- "Get Down off of the Train" (O'Kelly Isley, Ronald Isley, Rudolph Isley) by the Isley Brothers
- "Get Off the Track! (A Song for Emancipation)" (Jesse Hutchinson, Jr.), published 1844, by Hutchinson Family Singers
- "Get on Board, Little Children" (Traditional, attributed to John M. Chamberlain, 1873) by the Delta Rhythm Boys, Duke Ellington and His Orchestra, Red Foley, Tennessee Ernie Ford, the Freedom Singers, Shari Lewis, Ella Mae Morse, Cliff Richard, Paul Robeson, Carl Story and the Rambling Mountaineers, Jack Teagarden, Shirley Temple
- "Get on Our Train" (Ranjiro Miike, Kyoji Yamamoto) by Bow Wow
- "Gettin' Up Holler" (Traditional) by Cisco Houston
- "Ghost Train", separate songs, artists followed by composers: Ellen Allien (Ellen Allien), Gary Brooker (Gary Brooker), Marc Cohn (Marc Cohn), Elvis Costello (Elvis Costello), Counting Crows (Adam Duritz), Gorillaz (Ian Burden, Gorillaz, Phillip Oakey), Richard Greene (Larry Cansler, Richard Greene), Rickie Lee Jones (Rickie Lee Jones), Mary McCaslin (Mary McCaslin), Carrie Newcomer (Carrie Newcomer), Steve Roach, (Roger King, Steve Roach), Marty Robbins (Bob Nolan, Joe Babcock), Gary Stewart (Gary Stewart, Gregg Allman), the Stranglers (The Stranglers), Justin Sullivan (Justin Sullivan), Summer Camp (Summer Camp), Marion Williams (Thomas Newman), Eric Whitacre (Eric Whitacre)
- "Girl on a Train" (Scott Harris, Michael Keenan, Myles Mills, Emily Warren) by Skizzy Mars
- "Glendale Train" (John Dawson) by New Riders of the Purple Sage
- "Glory Bound Train", see "That Glory Bound Train"
- "Glory Train", separate songs, artists followed by composers: Pat Boone (Ferrell), Stephen Fearing (Stephen Fearing), Cissy Houston (Cissy Houston), Ricky Nelson (Baker Knight), Randy Newman (Randy Newman), Johnny Rivers (James Hendricks),
- "Going Away" (Utah Phillips) by Utah Phillips, Rosalie Sorrels
- "Going for a Pardon", original title, see "Eastbound Train"
- "Going Home Train" (Harold Rome) by Lawrence Winters
- "Going to Ride That Midnight Train" (Bill Chitwood, James A. Bland) by Georgia Yellow Hammers, 1927
- "Golden Rocket, The" (Hank Snow) by Johnny Horton, Hank Snow
- "Gone Dead Train", separate songs, artists followed by composers: King Solomon Hill (King Solomon Hill); Nazareth, Randy Newman, George Thorogood & the Destroyers, Neil Young & Crazy Horse (Jack Nitzsche, Russ Titelman)
- "Gone, Just Like a Train" by Bill Frisell
- "Gospel Train" (Traditional) by Marian Anderson, Acker Bilk, Eubie Blake, the Four Knights, John Hammond, Jr., Mahalia Jackson, Marie Knight, the Lewis Family, Lightnin' Wells, Mountain Heart, Sons of the Pioneers, Larry Sparks, Hank Snow, Sister Rosetta Tharpe, Merle Travis, Willard White
- "Graffiti on the Train" by Stereophonics from the album of the same name, Graffiti on the Train
- "Graveyard Train" (John Fogerty) by Creedence Clearwater Revival
- "Great American Bum" (Harry McClintock), also titled "The Bum Song" and "Three Jolly Bums", by Vernon Dalhart (1928), Ernie Hare (1928, as Hobo Jack Turner), Cisco Houston, Frank Luther (1928), Harry McClintock (c. 1928), Carson Robison (1928, as Dick Holmes)
- "Great Big Rollin' Railroad" (Music by Richard Proulx, lyrics by Bill Fries, aka C. W. McCall) Union Pacific Railroad's theme song from the late 1970s to mid 1980s
- "Great Crush Collision March, The" (Scott Joplin, 1896) by Scott Joplin
- "Great Locomotive Chase, The" (Robert W. Smith, 2007) by Robert W. Smith
- "Great Nashville Railroad Disaster (A True Story), The" (Bobby Braddock, Rafe VanNoy) by David Allan Coe
- "The Great Train Robbery" (actual event, song written by Leslie West, Corky Laing, Felix Pappalardi, Gail Collins Pappalardi) by Mountain
- "Greenville Trestle High" (James Jett, Joan Jett) by James Reams, Ricochet, Doc Watson

== H ==
- "Happy Go Lucky Local" (Duke Ellington) by Duke Ellington
- "Hard Travelin'" (Woody Guthrie) by Dave and Phil Alvin, the Brothers Four, Lonnie Donegan, Bob Dylan, Ramblin' Jack Elliott, Flatt & Scruggs, Lester Flatt, Beppe Gambetta, Arlo Guthrie, Woody Guthrie, Cisco Houston, Kingston Trio, Jimmy LaFave, Pete Seeger
- "Harmonica Train" (Sonny Terry) by Sonny Terry and His Night Owls
- "Harvard Student, The", also titled "The Pullman Train", (attributed to Louis Shreve Osborne, 1871) by Doney Hammontree
- "Have a Cigar" by Pink Floyd
- "He Is Coming to Us Dead" (Gussie Davis), published 1899 by Dry Branch Fire Squad (2005), G. B. Grayson and Henry Whitter (1928), the New Lost City Ramblers (1966), Ralph Stanley and the Clinch Mountain Boys (1996)
- "Hear My Train A' Comin'" (Jimi Hendrix) by Jimi Hendrix
- "Hear That Whistle Blow (A Hundred Miles)", adaptation of "500 Miles" (Hedy West), by Flatt & Scruggs
- "Heart Like a Locomotive" (Joe Droukas) by Paul Butterfield
- "Heartbreak Express, separate songs, artists followed by composers: Dolly Parton (Dolly Parton), Alabama (Jeff Cook, Phil Wolfe)
- "Heaven Road (天路)" (Yin Qing) by Basang, Tseten Dolma
- "Heavy Metro" by Botellita de Jerez
- "Hell Bound Train" (Traditional) by Frank Hutchison
- "Hellbound Train" (Andy Silvester, Kim Simmonds) by Savoy Brown, RSO (Richie Sambora & Orianthi)
- "Helping Hand (A Thousand Miles from Home)" (Dave Bartholomew, Fats Domino), related to Jimmie Rodgers's "Waiting for a Train", by Fats Domino, Snooks Eaglin
- "Here Comes the Santa Fe" (Douglas B. Green) by Riders in the Sky
- "Here We Are, Here We Are! (or Cross ober Jordan)" (Daniel D. Emmett, published 1863)
- "Hey Conductor" (Dave Carter) by Dave Carter & Tracy Grammer
- "Hey Porter" (Johnny Cash) by Johnny Cash
- "Hey, Hey Train" (Marty Stuart) by Johnny Cash
- "Hobo Bill" by Martha Copeland
- "Hobo Bill's Last Ride" (Waldo O'Neal), published 1929, by Gene Autry, Johnny Cash, Bill Clifton, Iris DeMent, Merle Haggard, Cisco Houston, Jimmie Rodgers, Hank Snow, Doc and Merle Watson
- "Hobo Blues" (Bernard Besman, John Lee Hooker) by Jeff Beck, Big Bill Broonzy, R.L. Burnside, Sleepy John Estes, John Lee Hooker, Big Walter Horton, Dr. Isaiah Ross, Sonny Boy Williamson; additional songs with this title, artists followed by composers: Peg Leg Howell (unknown); Johnnie Lewis (Johnnie Lewis); Yank Rachell (Yank Rachell); Bukka White (Traditional)
- "Hobo's Lullabye" (Goebel Reeves, 1934) by Graeme Allwright, Joan Baez, Ramblin' Jack Elliott, Arlo Guthrie, Woody Guthrie, Emmylou Harris, the Kingston Trio, the Nields, Goebel Reeves, Alf Robertson, Kevin Roth, Gary and Randy Scruggs, Pete Seeger, Bruce Springsteen and Pete Seeger, Bill Staines, Vanaver Caravan
- "Hobo's Meditation" (Jimmie Rodgers) by Boxcar Willie, Michael Chapman, Joe Glazer, Merle Haggard, Dolly Parton, Emmylou Harris and Linda Ronstadt, Jimmie Rodgers, Hank Snow, Ernest Tubb
- "Hobo, You Can't Ride This Train" (Louis Armstrong) by Louis Armstrong
- "Homebound Train" (Jon Bon Jovi, Richie Sambora) by Bon Jovi
- "Home in a Boxcar" (Sean Hoots) by Hoots & Hellmouth
- "Homeward Bound" (Irving Berlin), published 1915, from the musical comedy Watch Your Step
- "Homeward Bound" (Paul Simon) by Simon and Garfunkel
- "Honky Tonk Train Blues" (Meade Lux Lewis) by Meade Lux Lewis
- "Hot Box Blues" (Randy Leiner) by Boxcar Willie
- "Hot Rails to Hell" (Jeff Bouchard, Joe Bouchard) by Blue Öyster Cult, the Meatmen
- "Hot Town (Fess Williams) by Fess Williams & His Royal Flush Orchestra
- "How Long Has That Evening Train Been Gone" (Frank Wilson) by the Supremes
- "How Long, How Long Blues", (Leroy Carr, 1928), Red Allen, Casey Anderson, Kokomo Arnold, Chris Barber's Jazz Band, Walter Barnes, Count Basie, Gladys Bentley, Barney Bigard, Big Bill Broonzy, Bud & Travis, Leroy Carr and Scrapper Blackwell, Ray Charles, Ken Colyer, James Cotton, Eric Clapton, Pee Wee Crayton, Blind John Davis, Blind John Davis and Big Bill Broonzy, Wilbur De Paris, Fats Domino, Lonnie Donegan, Champion Jack Dupree, Archie Edwards, Ramblin' Jack Elliott, Doc Evans, John Fahey, Michael Falzarano, Ella Fitzgerald, Jesse Fuller, Nat Gonella and His Georgians, Davy Graham, Byrdie Green, Andy Griffith, Coleman Hawkins, Art Hodes and the Magnolia Jazz Band, Jools Holland, Richard "Groove" Holmes, John Lee Hooker, Hot Tuna, Howlin' Wolf, Betty Hutton, Lil' Son Jackson, Milt Jackson, Skip James, Blind Lemon Jefferson, Pete Johnson, Betty Hall Jones, Jorma Kaukonen, B.B. King, Alexis Korner, Kruger Brothers, Lead Belly, Meade Lux Lewis, Smiley Lewis, Wingy Manone and His Orchestra, Del McCoury, Jay McShann, Myra Melford, Memphis Slim, John Mooney, Jimmy Murphy, Jimmy Nelson, Red Nichols and His Five Pennies, Odetta, Pinetop Perkins, Dan Pickett, Preservation Hall Jazz Band, Sammy Price, Lou Rawls, Johnnie Ray, Toshi Reagon, Jimmy Reed, Buddy Rich, Jimmy Rushing, Brother John Sellers, Jack Sheldon, Archie Shepp and Horace Parlan, Speckled Red (Rufus Perryman), Sunnyland Slim, Monty Sunshine, Roosevelt Sykes, Tampa Red, Big Joe Turner, Big Joe Turner and Mike Bloomfield, Dave Van Ronk, Joe Venuti and Eddie Lang, T-Bone Walker, Billy Ward & the Dominoes, Dinah Washington, Doc and Merle Watson, Josh White, Doc Wiley, Jimmy Witherspoon, Jimmy Yancey, Ma Yancey

== I ==
- "I Do Wonder Is My Mother on That Train?" (Traditional) by Blind Joe Taggart, Josh White
- "I.G.Y." (Donald Fagen) by Donald Fagen
- "I Hate the Train Called the M & O" (Unknown) by Lucille Bogan, 1934
- "I Heard That Lonesome Whistle Blow", see "Lonesome Whistle"
- "I Know You Rider", by the Grateful Dead
- "I Like Trains", separate songs, artists followed by composers: Jim & Jesse, Bob Luman (Glenn Sutton); Fred Eaglesmith (Fred Eaglesmith)
- "I Often Dream of Trains" (Robyn Hitchcock) by Firewater, Robyn Hitchcock, Grant Lee Phillips,
- "I Once Knew a Chap Who Discharged a Function" (Gilbert & Sullivan), from Thespis
- "I Packed My Suitcase, Started to the Train" (Jennie Mae Clayton, Will Shade) by Memphis Jug Band, 1927
- "I Remember the Railroad" by Gene Clark
- "I Took the Last Train" by David Gates
- "I Want to Be in Dixie" (Irving Berlin), published 1912
- "I Want to Go to Morrow" (Lew Sully), published 1898, by Dan W. Quinn, recorded 1902
- "I Wish My Mother Was on That Train" by Blind Joe Taggart
- "I'm a Train" (Albert Hammond, Mike Hazlewood) by Albert Hammond
- "I'm Alabama Bound" (Robert Hoffman, 1909), also titled "Alabama Bound", by the Charlatans, the Delmore Brothers, the Greenbriar Boys, Woody Guthrie, Mississippi John Hurt, Papa Charlie Jackson (1925, first known recording), Louis Jordan and his Tympany Five, Peter La Farge, Mance Lipscomb, Roger McGuinn, Roger McGuinn and Pete Seeger, Jelly Roll Morton, Odetta, Tom Rush, Pete Seeger, Doc Watson, Doc and Merle Watson
- "I'm Blue, I'm Lonesome" (Bill Monroe, Hank Williams) by Red Allen, the Kentucky Colonels, the Del McCoury Band, Don McLean, Bill Monroe, Phish, the Seldom Scene, Marty Stuart and His Fabulous Superlatives
- "I'm Going Home on the Heaven Bound Train" by Rev. J.M. Gates, circa 1930
- "I'm Going Home on the Morning Train" (Traditional) by Ruth Brown, Wilma Lee and Stoney Cooper, Arizona Dranes Molly O'Day
- "I'm Leavin' on That Blue River Train" (Carson Robison) by Gene Autry, Carson Robison
- "I'm Leavin' on the Midnight Train" (Lead Belly) by Lead Belly
- "I'm Leaving on That Late, Late Train" (Solomon Burke) by Solomon Burke
- "I'm Movin' On" (Hank Snow) by Roy Acuff, John Barry, Hoagy Carmichael, Rosanne Cash, Ray Charles, King Curtis, the Everly Brothers, Jimmy Lee Fautheree, Charlie Feathers, Les Paul & Mary Ford, Connie Francis, Billy Fury, Hank Garland, Don Gibson, Merle Haggard, John Hammond, Jr., Emmylou Harris, Al Hirt, John Kay, Jerry Lee Lewis, Matt Lucas, Willie Nelson, Willie Nelson and Wynton Marsalis, the Pagans, Elvis Presley, Professor Longhair, Jerry Reed, the Rolling Stones, Leon Russell, Hank Snow, Steppenwolf, Taste, George Thorogood, Mel Tillis, Ernest Tubb, Tina Turner, Mac Wiseman, Gene Vincent, Faron Young
- "I'm On Fire" (Bruce Springsteen) by Bruce Springsteen
- "I've Been Working on the Railroad" (Traditional), first published in Carmina Princetonia, Princeton University, 1894, by Laurie Berkner, Oscar Brand, the Carter Sisters & Mother Maybelle with Chet Atkins, Johnny Cash, June Carter Cash, James Coffey, Dick Curless, Robert De Cormier, John Denver, Béla Fleck and Abigail Washburn, Tim Hardin, Ella Jenkins, Reckless Kelly, Liberace, Arthur Lyman, Randy Newman, Les Paul, Raffi, Pete Seeger, Buckwheat Zydeco
- "I've Got a Thing About Trains" (Jack Clement) by Bobby Bare, Jack Clement, Johnny Cash, Gove Scrivenor
- "If I Die a Railroad Man" (unknown) by Bailey Green, the Tenneva Ramblers
- "In a Boxcar around the World' (Cliff Carlisle), 1936, by Cliff Carlisle
- "In a Station" (Richard Manuel) by the Band, Olivia Newton-John
- "In the Baggage Coach Ahead" (Gussie Davis), published 1896, by Fiddlin' John Carson (1924), Vernon Dalhart (1918), George J. Gaskin (1896), Andrew Jenkins and Carson Robison (1928), J. W. Myers (1905), John Mellencamp, Dick Nolan Steve Porter (c. 1898), Dan W. Quinn (1896), Kate Smith (1932), Ernest Thompson (1924), Mac Wiseman (1960)
- "In the Dark" (Shane Told) from the album I Am Alive in Everything I Touch (2015) by Silverstein
- "In the Middle of the House" (Bob Hilliard) by the Ames Brothers, Milton Berle, Alma Cogan, Rusty Draper, the Johnston Brothers, Vaughn Monroe
- "In the Pines" (Traditional, related to "Black Girl"/"The Longest Train"/"Where Did You Sleep Last Night?") by Darol Anger and Mike Marshall, Chet Atkins and the Carter Sisters, Joan Baez, Boxcar Willie, Billy Bragg and Joe Henry, Catherine Britt, the Browns, the Carter Family, Gene Clark, Paul Clayton, Vassar Clements, Jimmie Davis, Duane Eddy, Fantastic Negrito, Charlie Feathers, Flatt & Scruggs, Tennessee Ernie Ford, Dan Gibson, Grateful Dead, Josh Graves, Richard Greene, Roscoe Holcomb, the Kentucky Colonels, Kossoy Sisters, Sleepy LaBeef, Tim Langford, Lead Belly, the Louvin Brothers, Charlie Louvin, Loretta Lynn, Marley's Ghost, Jimmy Martin, Bill Monroe, New Grass Revival, Nirvana, the Oak Ridge Boys, Osborne Brothers, Jerry Reed, Reno and Smiley, Leon Russell, Doug Sahm, Earl Scruggs, Pete Seeger, the Seldom Scene, Martin Simpson, the Sir Douglas Quintet, Fiddlin' Arthur Smith, Arthur "Guitar Boogie" Smith, Larry Sparks, Ralph Stanley, Merle Travis and Mac Wiseman, the Triffids, Dave Van Ronk, Gene Vincent, Dock Walsh (1925), Doc Watson, Clarence White, Mac Wiseman, Link Wray
- "Indian Pacific" (Joy Mckean) by Slim Dusty
- "Indian Summer" (Kelly Jones) by Stereophonics from the album Graffiti on the Train. References to drug use.
- "Into You Like a Train" (Richard Butler) by Jawbreaker, the Psychedelic Furs
- "Iron Horse" (Harry Frances, words/Alfred von Rochow, music), published 1870
- "Iron Horse" by Christie
- "Iron Horses of Delson, The" (Eldon Rathburn) by Eldon Rathburn
- "It Takes a Lot to Laugh, It Takes a Train to Cry" (Bob Dylan) by Bitter:Sweet, Blue Cheer, Ray Bonneville, David Bromberg, Bob Dylan, Bob Dylan and Neil Young, Fairport Convention, Marianne Faithfull, Jerry Garcia and Merl Saunders, Grateful Dead, Heart of Gold Band, Levon Helm, Robyn Hitchcock, Bruce Hornsby, Ashley Hutchings, Al Jones, Lisa Kindred, Kingfish, Kokomo, Al Kooper, Stephen Stills and Mike Bloomfield, Little Feat, Ulf Lundell, Mel Lyman, Taj Mahal, Ian Matthews, Mendoza Line, Frankie Miller, Tracy Nelson, Leon Russell, Earl Scruggs, Chris Smither, Phoebe Snow, Bobby Solo, Stoneground, Tír na nÓg, Toto, Artie and Happy Traum, Martha Velez, the Winkies
- "It Takes a Worried Man see "Worried Man Blues"

== J ==
- "J.C. Cohen" (Allen Sherman), parody of "Casey Jones" by Allan Sherman
- "J. C. Holmes Blues" (Gus Horsley, parody of "Casey Jones") by Bessie Smith
- "Jack Straw" (Bob Weir, Robert Hunter) by Grateful Dead
- "Jamestown" (Vinnie Caruana) from the album Forty Hour Train Back to Penn (2003) by The Movielife
- "Jay Gould's Daughter" (Traditional, related to "Milwaukee Blues") by Pete Seeger
- "Jay Goose Is Dead" (Traditional, part of "Jay Gould" family) by J. E. Mainer and His Mountaineers
- "Jenny on the Railroad" (Traditional) by Tracy Schwarz and Mike Seeger with the New Lost City Ramblers the Horse Flies
- "Jerry, Go Ile (Oil) That Car" by Harry McClintock
- "Jessie at the Railway Bar", also titled "Jessie, the Belle at the Bar", (G. Ware), broadside published 1884
- "Jim Blake's Message" (Traditional, copyrighted by Carson Robison, Pete Condon, 1927) by the Carter Family, Vernon Dalhart, Phipps Family, Jean Ritchie
- "Jimmie the Kid" (Jack Neville, Jimmie Rodgers) by Gene Autry, Merle Haggard, Jimmie Rodgers, Hank Snow
- "John Hardy" (Traditional) by Tom Adams, Clarence "Tom" Ashley, Joan Baez, Bobby Bare, Leon Bibb, Norman Blake, Dock Boggs, Jimmy Bowen, the Carter Family, Billy Childish, Roy Clark, Michael Cleveland, the Coachmen, Fred Cockerham, Country Gazette, the Country Gentlemen, the Dillards, Lonnie Donegan, the Easy Riders, Ramblin' Jack Elliott, Paul Evans, Raymond Fairchild, Flatt & Scruggs with Doc Watson, Bela Fleck, Michael Fracasso, Bill Frisell, the Gun Club, Alvin Youngblood Hart, Roy Harvey, Wayne Henderson, Bart Hopkin, Lightnin' Hopkins, Cisco Houston, Burl Ives, Tommy Jarrell, Buell Kazee, Kentucky Colonels, Koerner, Ray & Glover, the Lilly Brothers, Laura Love, Manfred Mann, Ed McCurdy, John McEuen, Katy Moffatt, Bill Monroe, Andrew Morse, Alan Munde, Northern Lights, Osborne Brothers, Peter Ostroushko, Pine Valley Cosmonauts, Jerry Reed, Ola Belle Reed, Don Reno, Tony Rice, Luther Russell, Doug Sahm, Earl Scruggs, Charles Seeger, Mike Seeger, Pete Seeger, Silver Apples, Martin Simpson, Sir Douglas Quintet, Sleepy Man Banjo Boys, Hobart Smith, Chris Smither, Roger Sprung, John Stewart, Ernest Stoneman, the String Cheese Incident, Todd Taylor, George Thorogood, Tony Trischka, the Twilights, Uncle Tupelo, Ben Webster, the Williamson Brothers, Glenn Yarbrough
- "John Henry" (Traditional, numerous variations) by Pink Anderson, Chet Baker, Harry Belafonte, Leon Bibb, Dock Boggs, Big Bill Broonzy, the Book of Knots, Buster Brown, Gabriel Brown, Hylo Brown, Ace Cannon, Fiddlin' John Carson, Cephas & Wiggins, Michael Cooney, Aaron Copland, the Cows, Joe Craven, Johnny Cash, Cuff the Duke, Eric Darling, Little Jimmy Dickens, Lonnie Donegan, Duane Eddy, Ramblin' Jack Elliott, David Dudley, Snooks Eaglin, John Fahey, Raymond Fairchild, Flatt & Scruggs, Tennessee Ernie Ford, Jesse Fuller, Tony Furtado, Alice Gerrard and Hazel Dickens, Bob Gibson, Lloyd Green, David Grisman, the Gun Club, Woody Guthrie, Rolf Harris, Ronnie Hawkins, Roscoe Holcomb, Johnny Horton, Burl Ives, John Jackson, the Johnson Mountain Boys, Grandpa Jones, Garrison Keillor, the Kentucky Colonels, Hugh Laurie, Lead Belly, Furry Lewis, Jerry Lee Lewis, the Lilly Brothers, the Limeliters, Uncle Dave Macon, Taj Mahal, J. E. Mainer, the Mammals, Jimmy Martin, John McCutcheon, Mississippi Fred McDowell, Brownie McGhee and Sonny Terry, Memphis Slim, Charlie Monroe, Bill Monroe, Odetta, Jerry Reed, Harvey Reid, John Renbourn, Don Reno and Red Smiley, Lesley Riddle Paul Rishell and Annie Raines, Paul Robeson, Tracy Schwarz, Mike Seeger, Pete Seeger, Bruce Springsteen, Ralph Stanley, Staple Singers, Stringbean, Marty Stuart, Texas Ruby and Curly Fox, Henry Thomas, Hank Thompson, Merle Travis, Porter Wagoner, Steve Wariner, Doc Watson, Josh White, Paul Winter, Chubby Wise
- "Jos Konduktöörin Nait" (Robbie van Leeuwen, Vexi Salmi) by Paula Koivuniemi and Fredi, both in 1972 in Finland. Original by Shocking Blue: "Never Marry a Railroad Man".
- "Junction" (Eldon Rathburn) by Eldon Rathburn
- "Jupiter and the 119" (Todd Sheaffer) by Railroad Earth, commemorating the Jupiter and 119 steam locomotives that met facing each other at the Golden Spike ceremony in Promontory Summit, Utah, 1869
- "Just Another Whistle Stop" (Richard Manuel, Robbie Robertson) by the Band, Phil Lesh
- "Just Like This Train" (Joni Mitchell) by Joni Mitchell
- "Just Missed the Train" (Danielle Brisebois, Scott Cutler) by Danielle Brisebois, Kelly Clarkson, Carly Hennessy, Trine Rein
- "Just Set a Light" (Henry V. Neal, Gussie L. Davis), published 1896, basis for "The Engineer's Child" and "Red and Green Signal Lights"

== K ==
- "Kassie Jones" (Furry Lewis) by Furry Lewis
- "K.C. Blues" (Traditional) by Frank Hutchison, Hobart Smith
- "K.C. Railroad Blues", also titled "K.C. Moan", (Andrew Baxter, Jim Baxter, 1927) by Andrew and Jim Baxter, Memphis Jug Band, Riley Puckett
- "King of the Road" by Roger Miller 1964
- "King's Cross" by the Pet Shop Boys
- "King's Special" by B.B. King
- "Kundalini Express" by Love and Rockets

== L ==
- "L'Oeil écoute" ("The Eye Listening") (Bernard Parmegiani) by Groupe de Recherches Musicales
- "L&N Don't Stop Here Anymore, The" (Jean Ritchie) by Norman Blake, Johnny Cash, June Carter Cash, Bobby Goldsboro, Kathy Mattea, Jean Ritchie, Michelle Shocked
- "L.& W. R.R. Station in Kentucky" (Frank Crumit) by Frank Crumit and Carson Robison (1928)
- "Lafayette Railroad" (Lowell George, Bill Payne) by Little Feat
- "Lagtrain" (Kaai Yuki) by inabakumori
- "Last Cannonball" by Mary McCaslin
- "Last Fair Deal Gone Down" (Robert Johnson) by Beck, Big Head Todd & the Monsters, Rory Block, Piet Botha, Greg Brown, R.L. Burnside, Cephas & Wiggins, Eric Clapton, Crooked Still, Rhett Forrester, Peter Green, John Lee Hooker, Robert Johnson, Jon Langford, Taj Mahal, Keb' Mo', Lonnie Pitchford, Hugh Pool, Rainer Ptacek, the Radiators, Dave "Snaker" Ray, Rising Sons, Dave Sharp, Sunnyland Slim, Dave Van Ronk
- "Last of the Railroad Men" (Ben Kaufmann, Adam Aijala, David Johnston) by Yonder Mountain String Band
- "Last of the Steam Powered Trains" (Ray Davies) by the Kinks
- "Last Old Train's A-Leavin'" (Jean Ritchie) by Jean Ritchie
- "Last Train", separate songs, artists followed by composers: The Backsliders (Stephen Howell, Chip Robinson), Big Big Train (Gregory Spawton), Bon Jovi (Jon Bon Jovi, Mark Hudson), Eric Clapton (Irvin Benno, Marc Benno), Dead Moon (Fred Cole), Graham Central Station (Larry Graham), Arlo Guthrie (Arlo Guthrie), the King Brothers (Newell Burton, Johnny Dyer, T. Graphia, Lee King, Sam King, John "Juke" Logan, G. McGlothen), Leo Kottke (John Fahey), Jimmy LaFave (Jimmy LaFave), Jerry Reed (Jerry Reed Hubbard), Primal Scream (Andrew Innes, Bobby Gillespie, Martin Duffy, Robert "Throb" Young), Allen Toussaint (Allen Toussaint), Peter Rowan (Peter Rowan), Travis (Francis Healy), Yes (Jon Anderson, Steve Howe, Chris Squire, Alan White)
- "Last Train from Poor Valley" (Norman Blake) by Norman Blake & Tony Rice
- "Last Train Home", separate songs, artists followed by composers: Blink-182 (Travis Barker, John Feldmann, Mark Hoppus, Matt Skiba); John Cate (John Cate); Nanci Griffith (Nanci Griffith); Foghat (Bryan Bassett); Lostprophets (Lostprophets); John Mayer (John Mayer); Pat Metheny (Pat Metheny)
- "Last Train to Amsterdam" by Ray Wylie Hubbard
- "Last Train to Clarksville" (Tommy Boyce, Bobby Hart) by the Monkees
- "Last Train to London" (Jeff Lynne) by Electric Light Orchestra
- "Last Train to San Fernando" by Johnny Duncan and the Blue Grass Boys
- "Last Train to Trancentral" by the KLF
- "Late for the Train" (John Maher, Pete Shelley, Steve Diggle, Steve Garvey) by the Buzzcocks
- "Leavin' Memphis, Frisco Bound" (Jesse Fuller) by Jesse Fuller
- "Leavin' Train" (Bruce Springsteen) by Bruce Springsteen
- "Let It Rock" (Chuck Berry) by Hasil Adkins, Chuck Berry, the Georgia Satellites, the Grateful Dead, the Head Cat, Jeff Lynne, MC5, Motörhead, the Refreshments, Johnny Rivers, Rockpile, the Rolling Stones, Bob Seger, the Shadows of Knight, Skyhooks, the Stray Cats, George Thorogood, Widespread Panic, the Yardbirds
- "Let Jesse Rob the Train" by Buck Owens
- "Life's Railway to Heaven", also titled "Life Is Like a Mountain Railway", (M. E. Abbey, Charles Davis Tillman), sheet music published 1893, by Roy Acuff, the Amazing Rhythm Aces, Bill Anderson, Mandy Barnett, the Blue Sky Boys, Boxcar Willie, the Browns, Henry Burr and James Stanley, Clifford Cairns and Charles Harrison, Johnny Cash, the Cathedrals, Steven Curtis Chapman, the Chuck Wagon Gang with Ricky Skaggs, Patsy Cline, Bill Coleman, Lacy J. Dalton, Jimmy Dean, the Charlie Daniels Band, John Fahey, Tennessee Ernie Ford, Bill and Gloria Gaither, the Greenbriar Boys, Buddy Greene, Merle Haggard, George Hamilton IV, Burl Ives, Norma Jean, Jim & Jesse, the Jordanaires, the Kendalls, Bradley Kincaid, Jerry Lee Lewis, Loretta Lynn, and Patsy Cline, Bill Monroe, Michael Martin Murphey, Willie Nelson, the Nitty Gritty Dirt Band, Dorothy Norwood and Albertina Walker, the Oak Ridge Boys, Brad Paisley, George Reneau, the Rice Brothers, Roscoe Robinson, Linda Ronstadt, the Seldom Scene, the Sensational Nightingales, Jean Shepard, George Shuffler, the Statler Brothers, the Stoneman Family, Carl Story, Russ Taff, Porter Wagoner
- "Lightning Express, The" (J. Fred Helf, Eddie Moran), also titled "Please, Mr. Conductor", by Blue Sky Boys (1940), Fiddlin' John Carson (1924), Vernon Dalhart (1925), Everly Brothers (1962), Frank Hutchison (1927), Bradley Kincaid (1931), George Reneau and Gene Austin (1924), Ernest V. Stoneman (1925), Gid Tanner (1924), Ernest Thompson (1924),
- "Light Rail Transit Line 1" by Justin
- "Lincoln's Funeral Train" (Norman Blake) by Norman Blake and Tony Rice
- "Linin' Track" (Traditional) by Jesse Fuller, Koerner, Ray & Glover, Lead Belly, Taj Mahal, Fred Neil, Omar & the Howlers
- "Little Black Train" (Traditional) by Dock Boggs, the Carter Family, Carlene Carter Jesse Fuller, Woody Guthrie,
- "Little Red Caboose" (Traditional) by Joanie Bartels, Laurie Berkner, James Coffey, Ella Jenkins, Elizabeth Mitchell and Lisa Loeb, Odetta, Sweet Honey in the Rock, Henry Thomas, Buckwheat Zydeco
- "Little Red Caboose Behind the Train, The" (Bob Miller, Will S. Hays) by Big Bill Campbell, Vernon Dalhart, Paul Warmack and His Gully Jumpers
- "Little Stream of Whiskey", see "Dying Hobo"
- "The Little Train of the Caipira" from Bachianas Brasileiras No. 2 by Heitor Villa-Lobos
- "Loco" by Yung Felix, Poke & Dopebwoy (videoclip was filmed in the Railway Museum in Utrecht, the Netherlands)
- "Loco Madi" (Duke Ellington) by Duke Ellington and His Orchestra
- "Locomotion" (Donald Fraser), soundtrack from a 1975 British Transport Films documentary directed by Geoffrey Jones
- "Locomotion" (Paul Humphreys, Andy McCluskey, Gordian Troeller) by Orchestral Manoeuvres in the Dark
- "Loco-Motion, The" (Gerry Goffin, Carole King) by Little Eva, Grand Funk Railroad, Kylie Minogue
- "Locomotive", separate songs, artists followed by composers: John Coltrane (John Coltrane); Guns N' Roses (Axl Rose, Slash); Vic Juris, Red Mitchell Jazz Trio, Thelonious Monk (Thelonious Monk); Les Tambours du Bronx (Les Tambours du Bronx); Matthews Southern Comfort (Terri Binion); Motörhead (Lemmy Kilmister, Michael Burston, Pete Gill, Phil Campbell); Susan Tedeschi (Susan Tedeschi); Alex Winston (Alex Winston, the Knocks)
- "Locomotive Breath" (Ian Anderson) by Jethro Tull
- "London Underground" by Amateur Transplants
- "Lonesome Joe" (Roy Acuff) by Roy Acuff, Boxcar Willie
- "Lonesome Pine Special" (Sara Carter) by the Carter Family
- "Lonesome Train" (J.J. Cale) by J.J. Cale
- "Lonesome Train" by Johnny Moore's Three Blazers
- "Lonesome Train (on a Lonesome Track)" (Glen Moore, Milton Subotsky) by Johnny Burnette, Robert Gordon and Link Wray
- "Lonesome Whistle" (Jimmie Davis, Hank Williams), also recorded as "I Heard That Lonesome Whistle Blow", by Mike Auldridge, Dave Alvin, Beck, Boxcar Willie, Billy Bragg and Joe Henry, Johnny Cash, Floyd Cramer, Lacy J. Dalton, Bobby Darin, Jimmie Davis, Bob Dylan, the Easy Riders, Dave Evans, Charlie Feathers, Don Gibson, George Hamilton IV, Ronnie Hawkins, Rev. Horton Heat, Ferlin Husky, Jim & Jesse, George Jones, Danny Kalb, Little Feat, Robert Lockwood, Jr., Ronnie McCoury, Charlie McCoy, Ricky Nelson, Willie Nelson, Del Shannon, Hank Snow, Townes Van Zandt, Gene Vincent, Porter Wagoner, Hank Williams, Hank Williams, Jr.
- "Long Black Train", separate songs, artists followed by composers: Lee Hazlewood (Lee Hazlewood); Alexis Korner (Alexis Korner, Duffy Power); Lonnie Johnson (Lonnie Johnson); Allison Moorer (Allison Moorer, Doyle Lee Primm); Josh Turner (Josh Turner); Conway Twitty (Conway Twitty)
- "Long Island Railroad" (Stephen Tunney), by Dogbowl.
- "Long Lost John" (Traditional), also titled "Lost John", by Etta Baker, the Everly Brothers, Curly Fox, Woody Guthrie, Kieran Kane, Leo Kottke, John Lennon, Brownie McGhee and Sonny Terry, Van Morrison, Lonnie Donegan and Chris Barber, Doc Watson
- "Long Train Blues" by Robert Wilkins
- "Long Train Runnin'" (Tom Johnston) by the Doobie Brothers
- "Long Twin Silver Line" (Bob Seger) by Bob Seger & the Silver Bullet Band
- "Longest Train I Ever Saw, The" by Frank Hutchison
- "Lord Made a Hobo Out of Me, The" (Boxcar Willie) by Boxcar Willie
- "Lost Train Blues" (Traditional) by the Blue Sky Boys, Woody Guthrie, J.E. Mainer's Mountaineers, Fiddlin' Arthur Smith, the Stanley Brothers
- "Love in Vain" (Robert Johnson) by Mickey Baker, John Baldry, Bob Brozman, Eric Clapton, Faces, Bob Franke, Robert Johnson, Tony McPhee, Keb' Mo', New Barbarians, Madeleine Peyroux, the Rolling Stones, Tesla
- "Love Is a Train", separate songs, artists followed by composers: Willie Nile (Willie Nile); Dwight Twilley (Dwight Twilley)
- "Love on a Blue Train" (Sheila E.) by Sheila E.
- "Love on a Real Train" (Tangerine Dream) by Tangerine Dream
- "Love Train" (Gamble and Huff) by the O'Jays
- "Lover Please" (Billy Swan) by Clyde McPhatter

== M ==
- "M & O Blues" (Big Bill Broonzy) by Big Bill Broonzy
- "Mail Train Blues, The" (Blair, Lethwick) by Sippie Wallace
- "Mainliner" (Jerry Leiber, Mike Stoller) by Esther Phillips
- "Mama from the Train (A Kiss, a Kiss)" (Irving Gordon) by Homer & Jethro, Patti Page
- "Mamie's Blues", see "2:19 Blues"
- "Many a Man Killed on the Railroad" (Traditional) by Joe Glazer
- "Marrakesh Express" (Graham Nash) by Crosby, Stills & Nash
- "Master of Ceremony" by Bad Company
- "Matalan Torpan Balladi" (Traditional, Reino Helismaa) by Olavi Virta, Johannes Virolainen, Katri Helena, Jukka Ruusumaa
- "Mean Conductor Blues" by Ed Bell
- "Mean Old Frisco (Mean Old Frisco Blues)" Eric Clapton, Arthur Crudup, Snooks Eaglin, Little Walter, Muddy Waters
- "Mean Ole Lonesome Train" (Otis Hicks, Jay West) by the Lightnin' Slim
- "Mean Old Train" by John Lee Hooker
- "Meet Me at the Station, Dear" (Sam L. Lewis, Joe Young, Ted Snyder), sheet music published 1917
- "Metro, The" by Berlin
- "Midnight Cannonball" by Big Joe Turner
- "Midnight Flyer", separate songs, artists followed by composers: Eagles, the Osborne Brothers, Kenny Rogers (Paul Craft, Ken Harding); Nat King Cole (Robert Moseley, Mayme Pauline Watts); the Pryor Band, 1904 (Arthur Pryor)
- "Midnight on the Great Western" (Benjamin Britten, Thomas Hardy), from Winter Words, Op. 52
- "Midnight Special" (Traditional) by Harry Belafonte, Creedence Clearwater Revival Gladys Knight & the Pips, Lead Belly, Johnny Rivers, Ken Whiteley
- "Midnight Train" (Micky Dolenz) by the Monkees
- "Midnight Train, The" (Traditional) published by Dorothy Scarborough and Carl Sandburg; and recorded by Dan Zanes (2004)
- "Midnight Train to Georgia" (Jim Weatherly) by Gladys Knight & the Pips
- "Midnight Train to Memphis" (Chris Stapleton, Mike Henderson) by Chris Stapleton
- "Might As Well" by Jerry Garcia
- "Mile Long Train" (Nelson) by Jimmy Dean
- "Milk Train", separate songs, artist followed by composer: Everly Brothers (Tony Romeo); Jefferson Airplane (Papa John Creach, Grace Slick, Roger Spotts)
- "Milwaukee Blues" (Traditional, related to "Jay Gould's Daughter") by Charlie Poole and the North Carolina Ramblers, 1930
- "Miniature Railway" from the Battersea Park Suite (William Blezard) by Royal Ballet Sinfonia
- "Mobile and Western Line" (Jazz Gillum) by Big Bill Broonzy
- "Molly on a Trolley" (William Jerome, Jean Schwartz) by Vernon Dalhart and Betsy Lane Shepherd (1922)
- "Monday Morning Choo Choo" (Rich Dodson) by the Stampeders
- "Monkey and the Engineer, The" (Jesse Fuller) by Jesse Fuller, the Grateful Dead, Dave Rawlings Machine
- "Mormon Engineer, The" (Oscar Brand) by Oscar Brand
- "Morningtown Ride" (Malvina Reynolds) by Stan Butcher, Brendan Grace, the Irish Rovers, the Limeliters, Bob McGrath, Raffi, Malvina Reynolds, the Seekers, the Wiggles feat. Jimmy Little
- "Moskow Diskow" by Telex
- "Move Over" (Irving Berlin), published 1914
- "Mr. Engineer" (Jimmy Martin, Paul Williams) by J.D. Crowe & the New South, Jimmy Martin, Tony Rice
- "Mr. Conductor" (Big Bill Broonzy) by Big Bill Broonzy
- "M.T.A./"Charlie on the M.T.A"", also titled "The Man Who Never Returned", by Jacqueline Steiner and Bess Lomax Hawes, most famously performed by the Kingston Trio in 1959.
- "My Baby's Gone" (Gary Atkinson, Hazel Houser, Joe Josea) by Blind Willie McTell
- "My Baby Thinks She's a Train" (David McComb) by The Triffids
- "My Cutey's Due at Two-to-Two Today" (Albert Von Tilzer, Leo Robin) by Bobby Darin and Johnny Mercer (with Billy May and His Orchestra), Firehouse Five Plus Two, Betty Hutton, Don Neely's Royal Society Jazz Orchestra, Ted Weems Orchestra (1926)
- "My Love Affair with Trains" (Dolly Parton) by Merle Haggard
- "My My Metrocard" (Le Tigre) by Le Tigre
- "My Rough and Rowdy Ways" (Jimmie Rodgers) by Merle Haggard
- "My Saviour's Train" (Charlie Monroe) by Charlie Monroe
- "My Soul's in Louisiana" by Otis Taylor, from album White African
- "My Train is Coming" by Andy Partridge
- "My Trains" by Lemon Demon.
- "My Wife's Gone to the Country (Hurrah! Hurrah!)" (George Whiting, Irving Berlin), published 1909
- "Mysteries of a Hobo's Life" (T-Bone Slim) by Cisco Houston
- "Mystery Train" (Junior Parker, Sam Phillips) by The Band, Johnny Cash, Eric Clapton, the Doors, Bob Dylan, Grateful Dead, Elvis Presley,

== N ==
- "Never Gonna Stop This Train" (James Keelaghan) by James Keelaghan
- "Never Marry a Railroad Man" (Robbie van Leeuwen) by Shocking Blue
- "New Delhi Freight Train" (Terry Allen) by Terry Allen, Little Feat, Ricky Nelson
- "New Frisco Train, The" (Bukka White) by Bukka White
- "New Market Wreck, The" (Traditional) by Mike Seeger
- "New Orleans Streamline" (Bukka White) by Bukka White
- "New Railroad" (Traditional) by Crooked Still
- "New River Train" (Carson Robison) by Roy Acuff, Al Bernard (1927), Norman Blake and Tony Rice, James Coffey, Vernon Dalhart (c. 1925), Cathy Fink, Red Foley, Andy Griffith, Kelly Harrell (1925), Frank Hutchison, the Kentucky Colonels, Bill Monroe, Roy Rogers and Sons of the Pioneers, Pete Seeger, Ernest V. Stoneman (1929), Doc Watson, Henry Whitter (1923)
- "New Train", separate songs, artist followed by composer: Paul "Earthquake" Pena with Jerry Garcia and Merl Saunders (Paul "Earthquake" Pena); John Prine (John Prine)
- "New York Hobo, The" by Darby & Tarlton
- "New York Trains, The" (Woody Guthrie, Del McCoury), by the Del McCoury Band
- "Nickel Plate Road 759" (Utah Phillips) by Utah Phillips
- "Night the Trains Broke Down" by (P. F. Sloan) by P. F. Sloan
- "Night They Drove Old Dixie Down, The" (Robbie Robertson) by Allman Brothers Band, Joan Baez, the Band, Big Country, the Black Crowes, John Denver, Tanya Tucker, Tammy Wynette
- "Night Train" (James Forrest, Lewis Simpkins, Oscar Washington) by Ray Anthony and His Big Band, the Boogie Kings, James Brown, the Champs, Buck Clayton All Stars, Clayton-Hamilton Jazz Orchestra, Vassar Clements, King Curtis, Wild Bill Davis, the Dirty Dozen Brass Band, Lou Donaldson, Teddy Edwards, Enoch Light, Jimmy Forrest, Tony Fruscella, Great Jazz Trio, Glen Gray and Casa Loma Orchestra, Al Grey, Wynonie Harris, Reverend Horton Heat, Ted Heath, Richard "Groove" Holmes, Eddie Jefferson, Jonah Jones, Roger Kellaway Trio, Rahsaan Roland Kirk, Leon McAuliffe and His Cimmaron Boys, Christian McBride, Jay McShann, Lucky Millinder, Buddy Morrow, Oliver Nelson, Joe Newman, Paul Revere & the Raiders, Oscar Peterson Trio, Louis Prima, Sir Douglas Quintet, Felix Slatkin, Jimmy Smith and Wes Montgomery, the Sonics, the Ventures, the Viscounts, Stevie Winwood, World Saxophone Quartet. Additional song with this title, artist followed by composers: Jason Aldean (Michael Dulaney, Neil Thrasher). Other songs with this title, written and performed by: Tab Benoit, LTJ Bukem, Bruce Cockburn, Antonio Forcione, Jonah Jones, Rickie Lee Jones, Amos Lee, Looptroop, Wynton Marsalis, Bill Morrissey, Lee "Scratch" Perry and Dub Syndicate, the Timewriter, Tindersticks, Visage
- "Night Train of Valhalla" (John Fahey) by John Fahey
- "Night Train to Memphis" (Beasley Smith, Marvin Hughes, Owen Bradley) by Roy Acuff, Spade Cooley, Floyd Cramer, Bing Crosby, King Curtis, Jimmy Dean, Little Jimmy Dickens, Duane Eddy, Everclear, Red Foley, Tennessee Ernie Ford, Johnny Hodges, David Holt, Grandpa Jones, Sleepy LaBeef, Jerry Lee Lewis, Joe Maphis, Benny Martin, Dean Martin, Ricky Nelson, New Coon Creek Girls, Roy Orbison and Faron Young, Osborne Brothers, Dolly Parton, Carl Perkins, Webb Pierce, Carl Smith, Jimmy Sturr, Mel Tillis, Hank Williams, Jr., Mac Wiseman
- "Night Train to Munich" by Al Stewart
- "Night Trip to Buffalo, A" by American Quartet
- "Nighttime in the Switching Yard" (Jorge Calderón, David Lindell, Waddy Wachtel, Warren Zevon) by Warren Zevon
- "Nightrain" (Steven Adler, Saul Hudson, Duff McKagan, Axl Rose, Izzy Stradlin) by Guns N' Roses
- "Nine Pound Hammer" (Merle Travis) by Chet Atkins, Norman Blake, the Beau Brummels, Johnny Cash, Cephas & Wiggins, Vassar Clements, Flatt & Scruggs, Tennessee Ernie Ford, David Grisman and Jerry Garcia, Jorma Kaukonen, Bill Monroe, the Nitty Gritty Dirt Band, the Osborne Brothers, John Prine, Tony Rice, Tom Rush, the Stanley Brothers, Merle Travis, Townes Van Zandt, Doc and Merle Watson
- "No Leaf Clover" (James Hetfield, Lars Ulrich) by Metallica and San Francisco Symphony
- "No More Trains to Ride" (Merle Haggard) by Merle Haggard
- "Nobody Cares About the Railroads Anymore" (Harry Nilsson) by Harry Nilsson
- "Northbound" (Don Walker) by Cold Chisel
- "Northshore Train" (Heidi Berry) by Heidi Berry
- "Nowhere Fast" (Johnny Marr, Morrissey) by the Smiths
- "Number 12 Train" (Josh White) by Josh White
- "No. 29" (Wallace) by Wesley Wallace

== O ==
- "Off the Rails" by Bottleneck ft. Ryan Upchurch
- "O & K Train Song" by Addie Graham
- "Oh! Mr Porter" by George Le Brunn and his brother Thomas (1892)
- "Oh, You Engineer" by Judy Henske
- "Oil Tanker Train" (Merle Haggard) by Merle Haggard
- "Old Buddy, Goodnight" (Utah Phillips) by Utah Phillips
- "Old Circus Train Turn-Around Blues, The" (Duke Ellington) by Duke Ellington and Ella Fitzgerald
- "Old Train" (Herb Pedersen and Nikki Pedersen) by John Denver, Tony Rice, Seldom Scene
- "Old Train 29" (Traditional) by Geoff Muldaur
- "Old Trains" by Wonk Unit
- "On a Slow Train through Arkansaw" (Al Bernard) by Al Bernard (1925)
- "On the 5:15" (Henry I. Marshall, Stanley Murphy), published 1914, by American Quartet, recorded 1915
- "On the Atchison, Topeka and the Santa Fe" (Harry Warren, Johnny Mercer) by Judy Garland, Harry Warren, Johnny Mercer
- "On the Evening Train", see "The Evening Train"
- "On the Honeymoon Express" (James Kendis) by Arthur Collins and Byron G. Harlan (1914)
- "On the Train" by Janis Ian
- "One After 909" (John Lennon, Paul McCartney) by the Beatles
- "One Way Ticket" by Jack Keller and Hank Hunter.
- "Only a Hobo" (Bob Dylan) by Hamilton Camp, Hazel Dickens, Bob Dylan, Jonathan Edwards, Lucky 7, Augie Meyers, Totta Näslund and Kajsa Grytt, the Seldom Scene, Rod Stewart. Additional song with this title: (Woody Guthrie) by Woody Guthrie.
- "Orange Blossom Special" (Ervin T. Rouse) by Chet Atkins, Hoyt Axton, Glen Campbell, Johnny Cash, J.D. Crowe, Charlie Daniels, Electric Light Orchestra, Fairport Convention, the Flying Burrito Brothers, Flatt & Scruggs, Merle Haggard, Jerry and Sky, George Jones, Doug Kershaw, Bill Monroe, the New Lost City Ramblers, the Nitty Gritty Dirt Band, Buck Owens, Dolly Parton, Seatrain, Hank Snow, the Stanley Brothers, the String Cheese Incident, Marty Stuart, Hank Williams, Bob Wills and His Texas Playboys
- "Orangedale Whistle" by The Rankin Family.
- "Orient Express", separate songs, composers followed by artists: (René Aubry) Christophe Guiot and René Aubry; (Boris Kovač) Boris Kovač; (Christian Burchard, Roman Bunka) Embryo (band); (Jon Camp) Renaissance; (B.M.Tang, S. Neradin) C.C.C.P.; (Marc Chantereau, Pierre-Alain Dahan, Slim Pezin) Voyage; (Moreno Dainese) Skauch; (DeBarge) Natasha St-Pier; (Frenchy and the Punk) Frenchy and the Punk; (Rick Hahn) Spies; (Jean Michel Jarre) Jean Michel Jarre; (Jay Jay Johnson) Jay Jay Johnson; (Karunesh) Karunesh; (Ennio Morricone, film score) Ennio Morricone and Solisti E Orchestre Del Cinema Italiano, Allen Toussaint Orchestra; (Gregg Rolie) Gregg Rolie; (Fuat Saka) Fuat Saka; (Paloma San Basilio) Paloma San Basilio; (Scott, Wood) Sidney Torch Orchestra; (Dan Siegel) Dan Siegel; (Michael Weiss) Michael Weiss; (Joe Zawinul) Vince Mendoza and Metropole Orchestra, Joe Zawinul
- "Oxford & 'Hampton Railway" by Jon Raven - c.1960s. Lyrics first written 1853, coinciding with the opening of the railway.

== P ==
- "Paddy on the Railway" (Traditional) by the Wolfe Tones
- Pacific 231 (Arthur Honegger)
- "Pan American" (Hank Williams) by Roy Acuff, Boxcar Willie, Dave Dudley, Hawkshaw Hawkins, Jim & Jesse McReynolds, the Seldom Scene, Hank Snow, Larry Sparks, Hank Williams, Hank Williams Jr.
- "Pan American Blues" (DeFord Bailey) by DeFord Bailey
- "Pan American Boogie" (Alton Delmore, Rabon Delmore) by Ray Campi, the Delmore Brothers, Wayne Raney and Brownie McGhee, Robin and Linda Williams
- "Panama Limited" (Bukka White) by Ada Brown, Mike Cross, Robert Johnson, Doug MacLeod, Tom Rush, Bukka White
- "Pan American Man" (Cliff Carlisle) by Cliff Carlisle
- "A Passage to Bangkok" (Geddy Lee, Alex Lifeson, Neil Peart) by Rush
- "Pat Works on the Railroad" (Traditional) by Joe Glazer
- "Pea Vine Blues" (Charlie Patton) by Rory Block, Charley Patton, John Sinclair, Big Joe Williams
- "Peace Train" (Cat Stevens) by Cat Stevens
- "People Get Ready" (Curtis Mayfield) by the Rance Allen Group, Lee Atwater, Jeff Beck, George Benson, the Blind Boys of Alabama, Billy Bragg, Eva Cassidy, Glen Campbell, Paul Carrack, the Chambers Brothers, Petula Clark, David Clayton-Thomas, Phil Collins, Tom Constanten, John Denver, the Doors, Bob Dylan, Jonathan Edwards, the Everly Brothers, Aretha Franklin, Janie Fricke, Al Green, Glen Hansard, the Housemartins, the Impressions, Jimmy James and the Vagabonds, Lyfe Jennings and Alicia Keys, Wynonna Judd, Bap Kennedy, Ladysmith Black Mambazo, Greg Lake, George Lynch, the Manhattans, Bob Marley, Ziggy Marley, Curtis Mayfield, the Meters, Ronnie Milsap, Aaron Neville, John Oates, Jimmy Osborne, Johnny Osbourne, Maceo Parker, the Persuasions, Johnny Rivers, David Sanborn, Dusty Springfield, Slim & the Supreme Angels, Pops Staples, Rod Stewart, Sonny Terry and Brownie McGhee, Hans Theessink, Phil Upchurch, Vanilla Fudge, Michelle Wright, Yellowman
- "Per Spoor (Kedeng Kedeng)", Dutch-English translation "By Rail (train sounds)", (Guus Meeuwis) by Guus Meeuwis
- "Phoebe Snow" (Utah Phillips) by Bryan Bowers, Utah Phillips
- "Play a Train Song" (Todd Snider) by Todd Snider
- "Please Mr. Conductor Don't Put Me Off the Train" (J. Fred Helf, E.P. Moran), published 1898 by Byron G. Harlan, see "Lightning Express" for recordings
- "Poor Paddy Works on the Railway" (Traditional) by Ewan MacColl, the Weavers, Brass Farthing, Authority Zero, Luke Kelly with the Dubliners, the Wolfe Tones, the Tossers, the Kelly Family, Shane MacGowan, the Pogues and Ferocious Dog.
- "Poinçonneur des Lilas, Le" by Serge Gainsbourg
- "Porters on a Pullman Train" (Charles D. Crandall), published 1880, by Arthur Collins and Byron G. Harlan, 1923
- "Poverty Train" (Laura Nyro) by Laura Nyro
- "Princess of the Night" by Saxon
- "Promised Land" (Chuck Berry) by Chuck Berry
- "Pullman Porter's Ball" (John Stromberg) by Metropolitan Orchestra (1901)
- "Pullman Porter Blues" by Clarence Williams, 1922
- "Pullman Porters Parade" (Maurice Abrahams, Ren G. May), published 1913

== Q ==
- "Queen of the Rails" (Utah Phillips) by Utah Phillips
- "Quiet Town" by the Killers

== R ==
- "Ragtime Engineer, The" (Sam M. Lewis, Clay Smith), published 1912
- "Rail, op. 57" (Wilfred Josephs), soundtrack for Rail, 1967 documentary for British Transport Films directed by Geoffrey Jones
- "Rail Rhythm" by Cab Calloway
- "Rail Road March" (Charles Meineke), copyrighted July 3, 1828
- "Railroad", separate songs, artists followed by composers: the Bee Gees (Billy Lawrie, Maurice Gibb), Grand Funk Railroad (Mark Farner), Lee Hazlewood (Lee Hazlewood), Lonely Drifter Karen (Tanja Frinta, Marc Meliá Sobrevias), Melanie (Melanie Safka), Preacher Boy and the Natural Blues, Status Quo (Francis Rossi, Kenny Young), Piero Umiliani (Piero Umiliani), the Zutons (The Zutons)
- "Railroad Bill" (Traditional) by Dave Alvin, Joan Baez, Etta Baker, Andrew Bird, Andy Breckman, Greg Brown, Cephas & Wiggins, Crooked Still, Lonnie Donegan, Bob Dylan, Ramblin' Jack Elliott, Vera Hall, David Holt and Doc Watson, Cisco Houston, Frank Hovington, Frank Hutchison, John Jackson, Taj Mahal, J. E. Mainer and His Mountaineers, Roger McGuinn, the New Christy Minstrels, Riley Puckett, Hobart Smith, Roba Stanley, Bob Stanley and Bill Peterson, Gid Tanner and His Skillet Lickers, Sonny Terry and Brownie McGhee
- "Railroad Blues", separate songs identified by composers in parentheses, sorted by recording artists: Louis Armstrong (Trixie Smith), 1953; Roy Bargy and Benson Orchestra of Chicago (Luckey Roberts), 1920, Beastie Boys (Beastie Boys); Norman Blake (Traditional), 1977; Woody Guthrie (Woody Guthrie, instrumental based on traditional "Cripple Creek"), 1940; Wayne Hancock (Wayne Hancock), 2001; Sam McGee, 1934; New Lost City Ramblers (San McGee), 1961; Luckey Roberts (Luckey Roberts), 1958; Trixie Smith (Trixie Smith), 1925;
- "Railroad Boomer, The" (Carson Robison, 1929) by Carson Robison and Frank Luther; recorded as "Boomer's Story" by Ry Cooder, North Mississippi Allstars; recorded as "The Rambler" by Cisco Houston
- "Railroad Corral, The" (Traditional, credited to Joseph Mills Hanson, 1904) by Rex Allen, Don Edwards, Juni Fisher, Michael Martin Murphey, Roy Rogers and Dale Evans, Gregg Smith Singers
- "Railroad Jim" (Nat Vincent) by Edward Meeker, 1916
- "Railroad Lady" (Jimmy Buffett, Jerry Jeff Walker, 1973) by Lefty Frizzell, Jimmy Buffett, Merle Haggard, Jerry Jeff Walker, Willie Nelson, J.D. Crowe and the New South, Todd Snider
- "Railroad Porter Blues" by Sylvester Weaver, circa 1928
- "Railroad Section Gang, The" by Peerless Quartet (1910)
- "Railroad Tramp" (unknown) by Dock Boggs
- "Railroading on the Great Divide" (Sara Carter Bayes, 1952) by the Carter Family, Bill Clifton, New Lost City Ramblers
- "Railroadin' and Gamblin'" (Traditional) by Uncle Dave Macon, New Lost City Ramblers
- "Railroadin' Some" (Henry Thomas) by Rory Block, Henry Thomas
- "Railroad Worksong" bij The Notting Hillbillies from album Missing...Presumed Having a Good Time
- "Rainy Train" (Toshihiro Niima) by Bow Wow
- "Rambler, The" (Traditional, see "Railroad Boomer") by Cisco Houston
- "Rambler Blues" by Blind Lemon Jefferson
- "Ramblin' Man" (Hank Williams) by Isobel Campbell and Mark Lanegan, Cat Power, Hackensaw Boys, Ronnie Hawkins, Frankie Laine, Kieran Kane, the Residents, Del Shannon, Hank Williams, Hank Williams, Jr., Robin and Linda Williams, Robin and Linda Williams, Yat-Kha, Steve Young
- "Ramblin' on My Mind" (Robert Johnson) by Tab Benoit, Rory Block, Del Bromham, the Chesterfield Kings, Eric Clapton, Arthur Crudup, Peter Green, Robert Johnson, Robert Lockwood, Jr., John Mayall & the Bluesbreakers, Lucinda Williams, Jesse Colin Young
- "Rambling Hobo" (Traditional) by Doc Watson and Clarence Ashley
- "Reckless Motorman, The" (Traditional) by Mike Seeger
- "Red and Green Signal Lights" (G. B. Grayson), based on "Just Set a Light" (1896) and also titled "Engineer's Child", by G. B. Grayson and Henry Whitter
- "Red Streamliner" (Bill Payne, Fran Tate) by Little Feat
- "Reuben's Old Train" by Bill Keith and Jim Rooney
- "Reuben's Train", also titled "Reuben" and "Ruben's Train" (Traditional) by Ray Charles, the Deighton Family, the Dillards, the Flying Burrito Brothers, Tony Furtado, Beppe Gambetta and Tony Trischka, Josh Graves, the David Grisman Bluegrass Experience, Michael Hurley, Rob Ickes, Harry Manx, Andy Irvine's Mozaik (with Bruce Molsky), Frank Proffitt, Sparky and Rhonda Rucker, the Scottsville Squirrel Barkers, Billy Strange and Don Parmley, Doc Watson, Doc and Merle Watson, Eric Weissberg and Marshall Brickman, Patrick Sky
- "Ride This Train" (Harvey Watkins) by the Canton Spirituals
- "Riding in de Limited Train" (Frank Dumont), published 1880
- "Riding on That Train 45" (Traditional, version of "Train 45") by Wade Mainer and Zeke Morris, New Lost City Ramblers
- "Riding on the Dummy Line" (Sam Booth, F.G. Carnes), published 1885
- "Riding on the L&N" (Lionel Hampton/Dan Burley, 1946) by Dr. Feelgood, John Mayall, John Mayall and Paul Butterfield, Nine Below Zero, Steamhammer
- "Right Track Wrong Train" by Cyndi Lauper
- "Rise and Fall of the Steam Railroad, The" (Eldon Rathburn) by Eldon Rathburn
- "Roamer, The" (Traditional) by Cisco Houston
- "Road Train" (Stu Mackenzie) by King Gizzard and the Lizard Wizard
- "Rock Chalk, Jayhawk", chant from the University of Kansas (1866)
- "Rock Island" from The Music Man by Meredith Willson
- "Rock Island Blues" (Furry Lewis) by Furry Lewis
- "Rock Island Line" (Traditional) by Long John Baldry, the Beatles, Harry Belafonte, Rory Block, Brothers Four, Johnny Cash, James Coffey, Don Cornell, Dick Curless, Bobby Darin, Lonnie Donegan, Snooks Eaglin, Ramblin' Jack Elliott, Stan Freberg, Gateway Singers, Johnny Horton, Grandpa Jones, Journeymen, Chris Thomas King, Lead Belly, Mano Negra, Roger McGuinn, Odetta, Carl Perkins, the Reverend Peyton's Big Damn Band, Rooftop Singers, Pete Seeger, Ringo Starr, the Tarriers, Sonny Terry and Brownie McGhee, the Travellers, the Weavers, Dan Zanes
- "Rock N Roll Train" (Angus Young, Malcolm Young) by AC/DC
- "Rocking on the Railroad" (Anderson) Chuck Berry
- "Roll On Buddy" (Traditional), related to "Nine Pound Hammer", by Roy Acuff, Kenny Baker and Josh Graves, Harry Belafonte, Norman Blake, Charlie Bowman, Sam Bush, Ramblin' Jack Elliott, Raymond Fairchild, the Greenbriar Boys and Bob Dylan, Roscoe Holcomb, John Jackson, Aunt Molly Jackson, the Kentucky Colonels, Del McCoury and the Dixie Pals, McGee Brothers, Bruce Molsky, Bill Monroe, the New Lost City Ramblers, Odetta, Red Smiley and the Bluegrass Cut-Ups, Ralph Stanley, Doc and Merle Watson, the Wilburn Brothers, Vern Williams, the Wood Brothers
- "Rollin' in My Sweet Baby's Arms" (Lester Flatt) by Roy Acuff, Boxcar Willie, Glen Campbell, Roy Clark, David Allan Coe, Billy "Crash" Craddock, Guy Davis, Dr. Hook & the Medicine Show, Flatt & Scruggs, the Grascals, Lloyd Green, Jack Greene and Jeannie Seely, George Jones, Sleepy LaBeef, the Legendary Shack Shakers, Rose Maddox, Jimmy Martin, the New Lost City Ramblers, Norma Jean, Buck Owens, Dolly Parton, Jerry Reed, David Rogers, Leon Russell, the Stonemans, the String Cheese Incident, Conway Twitty, Doc Watson, Willie Nelson
- "Roots Train" by Junior Murvin
- "Rovenshere" (Joanna Newsom) Joanna Newsom
- "Runaway Train", separate songs with this title, artists followed by composers: Jeff Berlin (Jeff Berlin); Blue Rodeo (Greg Keelor, Jim Cuddy); Rosanne Cash, Crooked Still, (John Stewart); Kasey Chambers (Kasey Chambers, Werchon); Joe Cocker (Ollie Marland); Vernon Dalhart (Robert E. Massey; Harry Warren, Carson Robison); Eliza Gilkyson (Eliza Gilkyson);, Guitar Shorty (Tommy McCoy); Ray Wylie Hubbard (Ray Wylie Hubbard); Elton John (Bernie Taupin, Elton John, Olle Romo); Henry Mancini (Henry Mancini); Steve Morse Band (Steve Morse); John Stewart (John Stewart); Stray Cats (Brian Setzer); Soul Asylum (Dave Pirner); Randy Travis (Jerry Steve Smith, Larry Gatlin); Dale Watson (Dale Watson); Geddy Lee (Geddy Lee)
- "Runaway Trains" (Mike Campbell, Tom Petty) by Tom Petty & the Heartbreakers

== S ==
- "Sailor Tattoos" (Vinnie Caruana) from the album Forty Hour Train Back to Penn (2003) by The Movielife
- "Salvation Train", separate songs with this title, artists followed by composers: Carl Story (John Hager); the Specials (Lloyd Chalmers)
- "Samuduru Devi" by Neville Fernando and Los Caballeros
- "San Francisco Bound" (Irving Berlin), published 1913
- "San Joaquin" by Molly Tuttle & Golden Highway and Ketch Secor of Old Crow Medicine Show
- "Scenic Railway, for piano, H. 115" (Arthur Honegger) by Jean-François Antonioli
- "Section Gang Blues" (Texas Alexander) by Texas Alexander
- "Sentimental Journey" (Les Brown, Ben Homer, Bud Green) by the Ames Brothers, Tony Bennett, Les Brown with Doris Day, Ray Charles, Buck Clayton, Rosemary Clooney, Rita Coolidge, Fats Domino, Bob Dylan, Duke Ellington, Ella Fitzgerald, the Four Lads, Harpers Bizarre, Harry James, Bert Kaempfert, Sammy Kaye, Julie London, Hal McIntyre, the Merry Macs, Jane Monheit, Willie Nelson, Sue Raney, Emmy Rossum, Dinah Shore, Ben Sidran, Frank Sinatra, the Singers Unlimited, Hank Snow, Ringo Starr, Steve and Eydie, Margaret Whiting
- "Shadows on a Dime" (Ferron) by Ferron
- "She Caught the Katy (and Left Me a Mule to Ride)" (Taj Mahal, Yank Rachell) by the Blues Brothers, Henry Kaiser, Steve Kimock, Harvey Mandel and Freddie Roulette, Albert King, Taj Mahal, Wet Willie, the Youngbloods
- "She Caught the Train", separate songs with this title, artists followed by composers: Big Bill Broonzy (Big Bill Broonzy), UB40 (Joe Monsano)
- "She'll Be Coming 'Round the Mountain" (Traditional) by Vernon Dalhart (1925), Al Hopkins and His Buckle Busters (1927), Uncle Dave Macon and John McGhee (1928), Carson Robison and Frank Luther (1928), Pete Seeger (1953) Gid Tanner and His Skillet Lickers (1927), Henry Whitter (1924)
- "Shiny Rails of Steel" (John Hartford) by John Hartford
- "Shuffle Off to Buffalo" (Al Dubin, Harry Warren) by the Boswell Sisters and Dorsey Brothers Orchestra, Ray Ellis, Alice Faye, Ruby Keeler, Hal Kemp, Cub Koda, Buddy Morrow
- "Silver Rails" (Jack Newman) by Hank Snow
- "Silver Train" (Mick Jagger, Keith Richards) by Carla Olson and Mick Taylor, Cheater Slicks, Naked Prey, the Rolling Stones, Roxx Gang, Sonic Youth, Johnny Winter
- "Silverton, The" (C. W. McCall, Chip Davis) by C. W. McCall
- "Six O' Clock Train and a Girl with Green Eyes, The" (John Hartford) by John Hartford
- "Six Times a Day (The Trains Came Down)" (Dan Fulkerson) by Dick Curless
- "Skimbleshanks: The Railway Cat" by Andrew Lloyd Webber, lyrics inspired by T.S. Eliot, from the musical Cats (1981)
- "Sleeper Train" (Dewey Bunnell, Bill Mumy and Robert Haimer) by America
- "Slow Train" (Flanders and Swann) by Flanders and Swann (1963)
- "Slow Train" (Bob Dylan) by Bob Dylan (1980)
- "Slow Train to Dawn" by the The (1986)
- "Slow Train to Nowhere" (John Mayall) by John Mayall
- "Smoke Along the Track" by Stonewall Jackson, Dwight Yoakam, Emmylou Harris
- "Smokestack Lightning" (Chester Burnett) by Ian Gillan, Grateful Dead, Henry Gray, Green on Red, John Hammond, Jr., Howlin' Wolf, Henry Kaiser, Frankie Lee and Bobby Murray, Louisiana Red, Lynyrd Skynyrd, Manfred Mann, Mississippi Fred McDowell, Tony McPhee, Lucky Peterson, Quicksilver Messenger Service, Fenton Robinson, Jimmy Rogers, Soundgarden, George Thorogood & the Destroyers, Watermelon Slim, Muddy Waters, Howard Werth, Chris Whitley, Widespread Panic, the Yardbirds
- "Snow" (Johnny Hawksworth), soundtrack for 1963 documentary for British Transport Films directed by Geoffrey Jones
- "So Many Roads, So Many Trains" (Marshall Paul) by Foghat, John Hammond, Jr., Slim Harpo, Cub Koda, Otis Rush
- "Sonderzug nach Pankow", Special Train to Pankow (Mack Gordon, Udo Lindenberg, Harry Warrenby) by Udo Lindenberg
- "Soul Train" by Simon Marrable
- "Southbound", separate songs, artists followed by composers: Hank Snow (Ned Miller), Doc and Merle Watson (Merle Watson)
- "Southbound Train" (Big Bill Broonzy) by Big Bill Broonzy, Davy Graham, Koerner, Ray & Glover, Muddy Waters. Other songs with this title, artists followed by composers: Graham Nash and David Crosby (Graham Nash), Jon Foreman (Jon Foreman), Nanci Griffith (Julie Gold), Mountain (Norman Landsberg, John Ventura, Leslie West), the Nitty Gritty Dirt Band (Dennis Linde), Steel River (Bob Forrester, Rob Cockell, Tony Dunning)
- "Southern Blues, The" (Big Bill Broonzy) by Big Bill Broonzy, 1935
- "Southern Cannon-Ball" by Jimmie Rodgers
- "Southern Pacific" by Neil Young
- "Southern Railroad Blues" (Norman Blake) by Norman Blake
- "Southern 'Rora" (The Joy Boys, 1962) - instrumental named after Southern Aurora, a sleeper train which ran nightly between Sydney and Melbourne in both directions from 1962 to 1986.
- "Spanish Train" (Chris de Burgh, 1975) by Chris de Burgh
- "Special Agent (Railroad Police Blues)" (Sleepy John Estees, 1938) by Sleepy John Estes
- "Special Streamline" (Bukka White) by Bukka White
- "Spike Driver Blues" by Mississippi John Hurt
- Station by Genezio, Nemzzz and Tiakola
- "Stardust Train" (Tak Matsumoto) by B'z
- "Starlight on the Rails" (Utah Phillips) by Flatt & Scruggs, Utah Phillips, Rosalie Sorrels
- "Station Approach" by Elbow
- "Steam Engine" (Chip Douglas) by the Monkees
- "Steel A-Goin' Down" (Buell Kazee) by Buell Kazee, Jim Smoak
- "Steel Rail Blues" (Gordon Lightfoot) by J.P. Cormier, Jim Croce, George Hamilton IV, Gordon Lightfoot, Fred McKenna, the Seldom Scene, Spanky and Our Gang, Mac Wiseman
- "Steel Rails" (Louisa Branscomb) by Alison Krauss, John Denver
- "Stephenson's Rocket" (Nigel Hess) by London Symphonic Wind Orchestra (Nigel Hess, conductor), overture for wind band celebrating the U.K.'s famous steam locomotive
- "Stop Rockin' That Train" (Ivory Joe Hunter) by Ivory Joe Hunter
- "Stop That Train" (Keith Rowe, Tex Dixon, Derrick Harriott) by Keith & Tex
- "Stop That Train" (Peter Tosh) by Clint Eastwood & General Saint, Jerry Garcia, the Meters, the String Cheese Incident, Peter Tosh, the Wailers
- "Stop This Train", separate songs with this title, artists followed by composers: Kevin Ayers (Kevin Ayers) John Mayer (John Mayer)
- "Streamline Train" (Red Nelson) Michael Chapman, Lonnie Donegan, Catfish Keith, Alexis Korner, Cripple Clarence Lofton, Van Morrison, Red Nelson (1936), Railroad Bill, The Vipers Skiffle Group
- "Streamlined Cannonball" (Roy Acuff) by Roy Acuff, Chet Atkins, Hoyt Axton, Norman Blake, the Browns, Floyd Cramer, Flatt & Scruggs, Tennessee Ernie Ford, Jerry Garcia, Jim & Jesse, Krüger Brothers, the Limeliters, Van Morrison, Earl Scruggs, Carl Smith, Hank Snow, Doc and Merle Watson, Mac Wiseman
- "Streetcar Blues" (Sleepy John Estes) by Sleepy John Estes
- "Sub-Rosa Subway" (John Woloschuk, Dino Tome) by Klaatu
- "Subway Funeral" (Geoff Rickly) from the album Common Existence (2009) by Thursday
- "Subways of your Mind" by Fex
- "Subway Train" (Johnny Thunders, David Johansen) by New York Dolls
- "Sucker Train Blues" (Dave Kushner, Duff McKagen, Slash, Matt Sorum, Scott Weiland) by Velvet Revolver
- "Sunnyland Train" (Elmore James) by Elmore James
- "Sunset Limited" (Harry J. Lincoln), published 1910
- "Sunshine Special" (Blind Lemon Jefferson) by Roy Acuff, Blind Lemon Jefferson
- "Super Chief by Count Basie
- "Super Rifle (Balkan Express)" on J.U.F. by Gogol Bordello and Tamir Muskat
- "Sweet Indiana Home" (Walter Donaldson) by Aileen Stanley (1922)

== T ==
- "Take the "A" Train" (Billy Strayhorn) by Count Basie, Dave Brubeck, Ray Bryant, Delta Rhythm Boys, Duke Ellington, Harry James, Salena Jones, Gene Krupa, Charles Mingus, James Moody, Tito Puente, Zoot Sims Bob Wills and His Texas Playboys, Teddy Wilson
- "Take the First Train Out of Town" (Freddie Bell, Pep Lattanzi) by Freddie Bell and the Bellboys
- "Talking Subway" (Woody Guthrie), by Woody Guthrie, John Greenway, Pat Foster/Dick Weissman
- "Tallahassee" (Frank Loesser) by Bing Crosby and the Andrews Sisters, Alan Ladd and Dorothy Lamour, Frank Loesser, Johnny Mercer, Dinah Shore and Woody Herman
- "Taumarunui (on the Main Trunk Line)" (Peter Cape) by Peter Cape
- "Te Ví En Un Tren" (Enanitos Verdes) by Enanitos Verdes
- "Tell the Engineer" (Fred Eaglesmith) by Fred Eaglesmith
- "Terminus" (Ron Grainer), soundtrack from 1961 documentary by John Schlesinger for British Transport Films
- "Texas and Pacific" (Jack Wolf Fine, Joseph E. Hirsch) by Louis Jordan and his Tympany Five
- "Texas Eagle" (Steve Earle) by Steve Earle and the Del McCoury Band
- "Texas Silver Zephyr, The" (Red Steagall) by Hank Snow
- "Texas, 1947" (Guy Clark) by Johnny Cash, Guy Clark, Robert Earl Keen, Jr.
- "Texas Trilogy, Part 2: Trainride" (Steven Fromholz) by Steven Fromholz, Lyle Lovett
- "That Glory Bound Train" (Odell McLeod), also titled "Glory Bound Train", by Roy Acuff, Pat Boone, Slim Dusty, Rose Maddox, Kitty Wells, Bukka White
- "That Railroad Rag" (Nat Vincent, Ed Bimberg) by Edward Meeker (1911), Walter Van Brunt (1911) Collins and Harlan
- "That Same Old Dotted Line" by Hank Snow
- "The California Zephyr" (written by Jim Ringer) sung by Mary McCaslin) [Album: Sunny California, 1979]
- "The Engineers Don't Wave From the Trains Anymore" (Tom T Hall) by the Lynn Morris Band (1992)

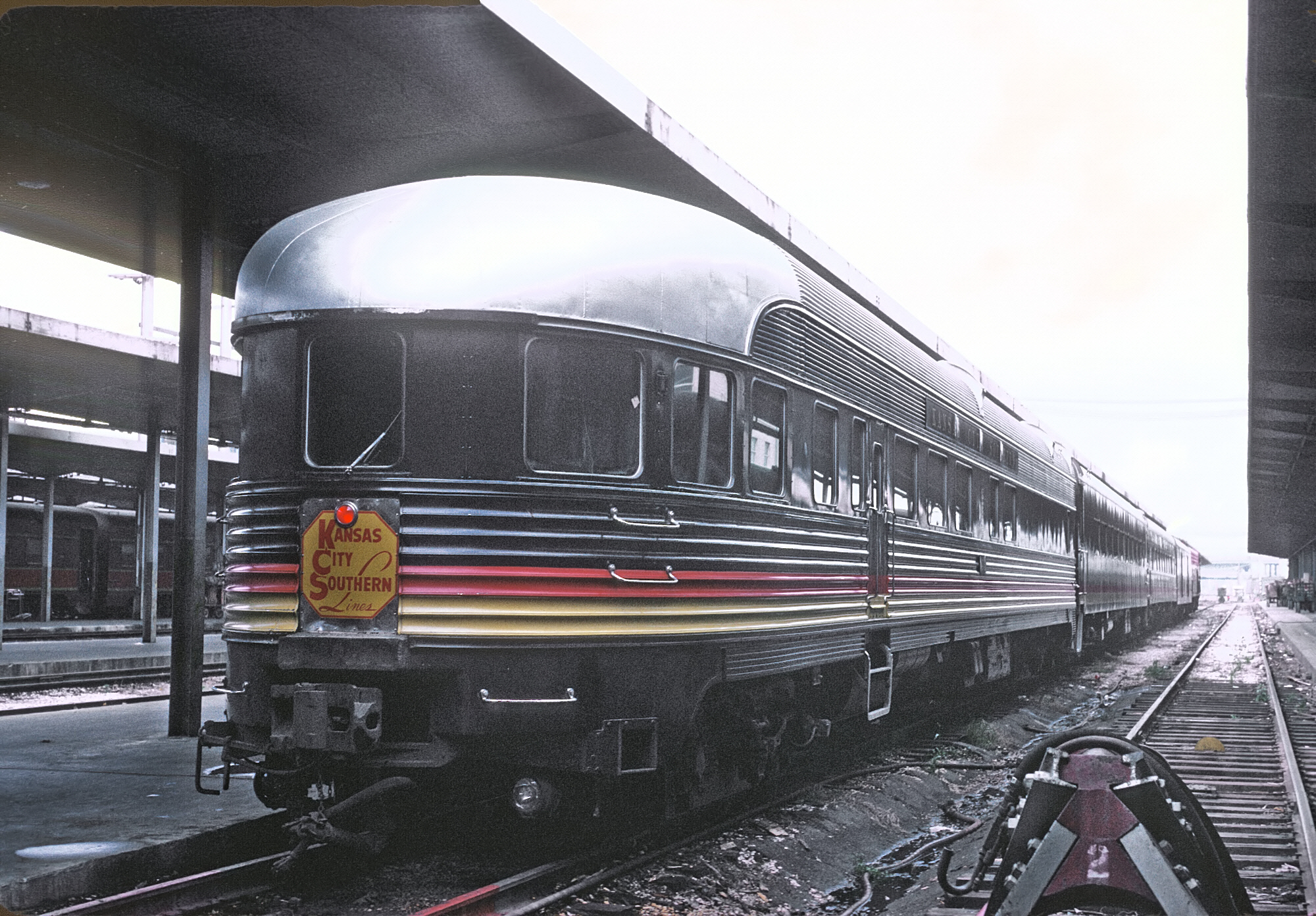
Louisiana and Arkansas Railway's Train 10, The Flying Crow, at New Orleans Union Terminal on November 22, 1967.

- "The Flying Crow" by Black Ivory King
- "The Okaihau Express" by Peter Cape
- "The Way His Collar Falls" (Chris Conley) from the EP I'm Sorry I'm Leaving (1999) by Saves the Day
- "The Train and the River" by Jimmy Giuffre (1957)
- "There's a Little Box of Pine on the 7:29" (Joseph Ettlinger, Billy Hill, 1931) by Asa Martin and Doc Roberts, Hank Snow, Mac Wiseman
- "There's a Train" (Sherman Holmes) by Holmes Brothers
- "There's a Train Out for Dreamland" (Carl Kress, Frederich H. Heider) by Nat King Cole
- "There's Lots of Stations on My Railroad Track" (Joe McCarthy, Leo Edwards) by Ada Jones and Billy Murray (1914), Ed Morton (1912)
- "Third Engine" (Chris Conley) from the album Through Being Cool (1999) by Saves the Day
- "This Train" (Traditional, also recorded as "This Train Is Bound for Glory") by Louis Armstrong, Big Bill Broonzy, Hylo Brown, James Coffey, Alice Coltrane, Steve Dawson, Sandy Denny, D.O.A., Lonnie Donegan, Johnny Duncan, Raymond Fairchild, Bob Gibson, Golden Gate Quartet, Woody Guthrie, Cisco Houston, David Houston, Janis Ian, Mahalia Jackson, Ella Jenkins, Sleepy LaBeef, the Limeliters, Bob Marley and the Wailers, Ziggy Marley, Mason Dixon, Tom and Ben Paley, Carlton Pearson, Peter, Paul and Mary, Utah Phillips, Edmundo Ros, Bob Rowe, Pete Seeger, the Seekers, Hank Snow, Billy Strange, Jack Teagarden, Sister Rosetta Tharpe, Hank Thompson, Randy Travis, the Verlaines, Bunny Wailer, Elder Roma Wilson, Buckwheat Zydeco
- "This Train Don't Stop There Anymore" (Elton John, Bernie Taupin) by Elton John
- "This Train Revised" (Amy Ray) by the Indigo Girls, from the album Swamp Ophelia
- "This Train's a Clean Train" (Traditional, related to "This Train") by Joe Glazer
- "Thomas the Tank Engine Theme Song" (Original, related to "Thomas the Train") by Mike O'Donnell and Junior Campbell (2004)
- "Ticket Agent, Ease Your Window Down" (Clarence Williams) by Bessie Smith
- "Ticket Agent Blues" (Blind Willie McTell) by Blind Willie McTell
- "Ticket to Ride" (John Lennon/Paul McCartney) by The Beatles
- "Time Flies By (When You're A Driver Of A Train)" by Half Man Half Biscuit
- "Timetable Blues" (Traditional), sheet music published 1911, by Captain Appleblossom (1929), New Lost City Ramblers (1968)
- "To Morrow" (Lew Sully), published 1898 as "I Want to Go to Morrow", by Bob Gibson, the Kingston Trio, Dan W. Quinn (1902)
- "Too Too Train Blues" (Big Bill Broonzy) by Big Bill Broonzy
- "Tons of Steel" (Brent Mydland) by Grateful Dead, 1987
- "Took the Last Train" by David Gates, 1978
- "Toot, Toot, Tootsie (Goo' Bye)" (Gus Kahn, Ernie Erdman, Dan Russo), published 1922, by Pearl Bailey, Tony Bennett, Mel Blanc, Bloodstone, Eddie Cantor, Bing Crosby, Vic Damone, Ted Heath, Eddie Howard, Al Jolson, Spike Jones, Brenda Lee, George Lewis and Don Ewell, Jerry Lee Lewis, Dean Martin, Tony Martin, Art Mooney, Wayne Newton, Kid Ory, Buddy Rich, Ted Fio Rito, Max Roach, Sonny Rollins, Brent Spiner, Hop Wilson, Jackie Wilson
- "Train" by Mose Allison
- "Train" by Robert Bradley's Blackwater Surprise
- "Train" by Neyla Pekarek
- "Train" (Prince) by Prince
- "Train, The", separate songs, artists followed by composers: Tim Buckley (Tim Buckley); King's X (Jerry Gaskill, Doug Pinnick, Ty Tabor); Macklemore & Ryan Lewis (Macklemore & Ryan Lewis)
- "Train 1262", see "Wreck of the 1262
- "The Train (1964 film)" with music by Maurice Jarre
- "Train 45" (Traditional, related to "Reuben's Train"/"900 Miles") by the Country Gentlemen, J.D. Crowe, Benton Flippen, G.B. Grayson and Henry Whitter, Woody Guthrie, Jimmy Martin, Del McCoury and the Dixie Pals, Bill Monroe, the New Lost City Ramblers, Sonny Osborne, Earl Scruggs, the Stanley Brothers, Marty Stuart, Mac Wiseman
- "Train A-Travelin'" (Bob Dylan) by Bob Dylan, under the pseudonym Blind Boy Grunt
- "Train Across Ukraine" (Annette Ezekiel Kogan) by Golem
- "Train Blues" (Woody Guthrie) by Woody Guthrie and Sonny Terry
- "Train Carrying Jimmie Rodgers Home, The" (Greg Brown) by Greg Brown, Iris DeMent, Prudence Johnson, the Nashville Bluegrass Band
- "Train Comes Through" (Ezra Furman) by Ezra Furman
- "(Un) Train d'Enfer" by Marie Philippe
- "Train Fare Home" (Muddy Waters), also titled "Train Fare Blues" and "Win My Train Fare Home (If I Ever Get Lucky)", by Robert Plant, Muddy Waters
- "Train for Auschwitz" (Tom Paxton) by Tom Paxton
- "Train from Kansas City" (Ellie Greenwich, Jeff Barry) by the Shangri-Las
- "Train Home" (Chris Smither) by Patty Larkin, Rich Moore and Mollie O'Brien, Chris Smither
- "Train in the Distance" (Paul Simon) by Paul Simon
- "Train in Vain" (Mick Jones, Joe Strummer) by the Clash, Annie Lennox, Dwight Yoakam
- "Train Is Gone, The", separate songs with this title, artist followed by composer: Memphis Slim (Memphis Slim), Michael Bloomfield (Michael Bloomfield)
- "Train Kept A-Rollin" (Tiny Bradshaw, Howie Kay, Louis Mann) by Aerosmith, Jeff Beck, Tiny Bradshaw, Johnny Burnette, David "Honeyboy" Edwards, Colin James, Motörhead, the Nazz, Twisted Sister, Yardbirds
- "Train Kept Rolling On" (Jem Finer) by the Pogues
- "Train Leaves Here This Morning" (Bernie Leadon, Gene Clark) by the Byrds, Gene Clark, Dillard & Clark, Eagles, the Seldom Scene
- "Train Long-Suffering" (Nick Cave) by Nick Cave and the Bad Seeds
- "Train Man" (Bob Seger) by the Bob Seger System
- "Train Music" (Percy Grainger), 1900–01
- "Train My Woman's On, The" (Neil Merritt) by Hank Snow
- "Train of Love", separate songs with this title, artists followed by composers: Paul Anka, Annette Funicello (Paul Anka); Johnny Cash, Jimmie Dale Gilmore, Robert Gordon, Laurie Lewis, Doc Watson (Johnny Cash); Guy Mitchell (Alex Kramer, Hy Zaret, Joan Whitney); Neil Young & Crazy Horse (Neil Young); the Pogues; Willie Hutch; Bob Dylan
- "Train of Thought", separate songs with this title, artists followed by composers: (Pal Waaktaar) by a-ha, (Alan O'Day) by Cher
- "Train on the Island" (Traditional) by Laura Cortese, Hazel Dickens and Alice Gerrard, Rayna Gellert and Susie Goehring, Sara Grey, Joe Hickerson, Tommy Jarrell, Joy Kills Sorrow, Mac Martin, Bruce Molsky and Big Hoedown, Tim O'Brien, Todd Phillips, Tao Seeger, Peter Stampfel and the Ether Frolic Mob, Stephen Wade
- "Train Ride in G" by Mason Williams
- "Train Round the Bend" (Lou Reed) by the Velvet Underground
- "Train Running Low on Soul Coal" (Andy Partridge) by XTC
- "Train Song", separate songs with this title, artists followed by composers: Harry Belafonte and Miriam Makeba (Traditional, Xhosa); Bim Skala Bim, Holly Cole, the Holmes Brothers, Tom Waits (Tom Waits); Vashti Bunyan (Bunyan, Clayre); Eliza Carthy (Ben Ivitsky, Eliza Carthy); King Curtis (composer unlisted); Delta 5 (Delta 5); Flying Burrito Brothers (Chris Hillman, Gram Parsons); Steel Mill, Bruce Springsteen; Johnossi (Ossi Bonde, John Engelbert); Listener (Listener); Murray McLauchlan (Murray McLauchlan); Stephin Merritt (Stephin Merritt); Carol Noonan (Carol Noonan); Pentangle (Bert Jansch, Danny Thompson, Jacqui McShee, John Renbourn, Terry Cox); Tom Waits; the Reverend Peyton's Big Damn Band (The Reverend Peyton's Big Damn Band); Phish (Mike Gordon); Mindy Smith (Mindy Smith); Smoke (Smoke); Smokie (Alan Silson); Brent Spiner and Maude Maggart (Brent Spiner, Maude Maggart); Summer Hymns (Zach Gresham); Andy Summers (Andy Summers); Wendy Waldman (Wendy Waldman)
- "Train Song, The" (Nick Cave) by Nick Cave and the Bad Seeds
- "Train Song Medley" by the Persuasions
- "Train That Carried My Girl from Town, The" by Roscoe Holcomb, Frank Hutchison, Doc Watson,
- "Train That Never Runs, A" (Bill Rice, Jerry Foster) by Bobby Bare
- "Train Time at Pun'kin Centre" by Cal Stewart and American Quartet, 1919
- "Train Time Blues" (Cecil Gant) by Roy Brown, Cecil Gant, Amos Milburn; additional song with this title, artist followed by composer: Tampa Red (Hudson Whittaker)
- "Train to Chicago" Mike Doughty
- "Train to Nowhere" (Dave Burgess) by the Champs
- "Train to Nowhere" (Kim Simmonds, Chris Youlden) by Savoy Brown
- "Train to São Paulo" from Powaqqatsi by Philip Glass
- "Train, Train", separate songs, artists followed by composers: Blackfoot (Shorty Medlocke), Tak Matsumoto Group (Tak Matsumoto)
- "Train Was Saved, The" (Charles Graham), published 1891
- "Train Whistle Blues" (Jimmie Rodgers) by Gene Autry, Steve Forbert, Merle Haggard, Jimmie Rodgers, Hank Snow, Doc and Richard Watson, Robin and Linda Williams; additional songs with this title, artists followed by composers: Amos Milburn (Amos Milburn); Sonny Terry (Sonny Terry)
- "Train with the Rhumba Beat" (Johnny Horton) by Johnny Horton, Rusty Draper
- "Train Wreck" (James Arthur) by James Arthur
- "Trains"" (Ian Anderson, Peter-John Vettese) by Ian Anderson
- "Trains" (Mohr) by Reginald Gardiner
- "Trains" (Steven Wilson) by Porcupine Tree
- "Trains" (Ryan Adams by Ryan Adams
- "Trains and Boats and Planes" (Burt Bacharach, Hal David) by Dionne Warwick, Billy J. Kramer and the Dakotas
- "Trains of Waterloo, The" (Les Barker) by Les Barker and Mrs. Ackroyd Band with June Tabor
- "Trains Make Me Lonesome" (Marty Haggard) by George Strait
- "Trains to Brazil" (Fyfe Dangerfield) by Guillemots
- "Traintime" (Jack Bruce) by Cream
- "Trainwreck" (Tim Anderson, Jillian Banks, Aron Forbes, Dacoury Natche, Jesse Rogg) by Banks
- "Trainwreck of Emotion" (Alan Rhody, Jon Vezner) by Del McCoury, Lorrie Morgan
- "Tramp, The" (Traditional, c. 1873–1893) by Vernon Dalhart (1926), Sam and Kirk McGee (1927)
- "Trams of Old London" by Robyn Hitchcock
- "Trans-Europe Express" by Kraftwerk
- "Transylvania Terror Train" (Jesse Dayton) by Captain Clegg and the Night Creatures
- "Trem das Onze" by (Adoniran Barbosa).
- "Tren al Sur" by Los Prisioneros
- "Trenulețul" by Zdob și Zdub and Frații Advahov
- "Trolley Song, The" (Hugh Martin, Ralph Blane), from Meet Me in St. Louis, by Herb Alpert, Tony Bennett, the Brook Brothers, Dave Brubeck, Carol Burnett, Frankie Carle and His Orchestra, Betty Carter, Claiborne Cary, Barbara Cook, Paul Desmond, Michael Feinstein, Judy Garland, Tubby Hayes, the Hi-Lo's, Stacey Kent, Donald Lambert, Melba Liston, Julie London, Marilyn Maxwell, Mantovani, Frank Sinatra, Kate Smith, Jo Stafford, Kay Starr, Kay Thompson, Sarah Vaughan
- "Trouble in Mind" (Richard M. Jones) by Mick Abrahams, Cannonball Adderley, Mose Allison, Ray Anthony, Louis Armstrong, Eddy Arnold, Asleep at the Wheel, Gene Autry, Randy California, Glen Campbell and Tennessee Ernie Ford, Ace Cannon, Johnny Cash, Cephas & Wiggins, Clifton Chenier, Sam Cooke, Hank Crawford, King Curtis, Barbara Dane, Blind John Davis, Spencer Davis Group, Willy DeVille, the Dinning Sisters and Tex Ritter, Fats Domino, Bob Dylan, Duane Eddy, the Everly Brothers, Marianne Faithfull, Ella Fitzgerald, Aretha Franklin, Tony Furtado and John Jackson, Red Garland, Terry Garland, John Gorka, Merle Haggard, Bill Haley, Alex Harvey, Aubrey Haynie, Bertha "Chippie" Hill, David Holt, John Lee Hooker, Lightnin' Hopkins, Big Walter Horton, Helen Humes, Bert Jansch, Larry Johnson, George Jones, Boogaloo Joe Jones, Richard M. Jones, Janis Joplin, Willie Kent, Freddie King, B.B. King, Yusef Lateef, Julia Lee, Jerry Lee Lewis, Mance Lipscomb, Junior Mance, Brownie McGhee and Sonny Terry, Jay McShann, Memphis Slim, Amos Milburn, Lucky Millinder, Little Brother Montgomery, Geoff Muldaur, Willie Nelson and Leon Russell, Oliver Nelson, Les Paul and Georgia White, Peter and Gordon, Lou Rawls, Johnnie Ray, Francine Reed, Jimmy Reed, Reel World String Band, Jimmy Rushing, Archie Shepp and Horace Parlan, Nina Simone, Hank Snow, Jo Stafford, Kay Starr, Sister Rosetta Tharpe, Rufus Thomas, Conway Twitty, James Blood Ulmer, Eddie "Cleanhead" Vinson, Bennie Wallace, Dinah Washington, Muddy Waters, Ben Webster, Georgia White, Blind Connie Williams, Jimmy Witherspoon
- "True and Trembling Brakeman, The" by Cliff Carlisle
- "Trusty Lariet, The (Cowboy Fireman)" (Harry McClintock) by Harry McClintock
- "Tucson Train" (Bruce Springsteen) by Bruce Springsteen
- "Tuesday's Gone" (Allen Collins, Ronnie Van Zant) by Atlanta Rhythm Section, Nell Bryden, Larry Cordle, the Crust Brothers, King Bee, Lynyrd Skynyrd, Metallica, Randy Montana and Shooter Jennings, Hank Williams, Jr.
- "Tulsa Queen" (Emmylou Harris, Rodney Crowell) by Emmylou Harris
- "Turbo" (Eldon Rathburn) by Atlantic Brass Quintet
- "Two Tickets to Georgia" (Charles Tobias, J. Fred Coots, Joe Young) by Ben Pollack
- "Two Trains" (Lowell George) by Lowell George, Nicolette Larson, Claudia Lennear, Little Feat
- "Two Trains" by Yo La Tengo
- "Two Trains Running" (Muddy Waters) by the Blues Project, Paul Butterfield Blues Band, James Cotton, Maxwell Street Jimmy Davis, Bob Dylan, John Hammond, Jr., Danny Kalb, Al Kooper, Watermelon Slim, James "Son" Thomas, George Thorogood & the Destroyers, Dave Van Ronk, Joe Louis Walker
- "Two Winding Rails" by Sierra Hull

== U ==
- "Under Your Thumb" (Kevin Godley, Lol Creme) by Godley & Creme
- "Underground Rail Car", also titled "Song of the Fugitive", (George N. Allen), written and published 1854
- "U.S. Highball" by Harry Partch

== V ==
- "Villa-Lobos / Honegger / Glass Train" from "Genre Implosions No. 3", by Mark Alburger
- "Virginian Strike of '23" (Roy Harvey, Earl Shirkey, 1929) by Roy Harvey, Earl Shirkey, Mike Seeger

== W ==
- "Wabash Cannonball" (Traditional) by Roy Acuff, Cannonball Adderley, Eddy Arnold, Chet Atkins, Norman and Nancy Blake, Boxcar Willie, Ace Cannon, the Carter Family, Johnny Cash, Floyd Cramer, Bing Crosby, the Delmore Brothers, Little Jimmy Dickens, Doc and Merle Watson, Lonnie Donegan, Rusty Draper, Duane Eddy, Ramblin' Jack Elliott, Flatt & Scruggs, the Four Lads, Robert Fripp and the League of Crafty Guitarists, David Holt, Wanda Jackson, Jim & Jesse, George Jones, the Limeliters, Guy Lombardo, the Louvin Brothers, Charlie Louvin, Claire Lynch, Benny Martin, Charlie McCoy, Blind Willie McTell, Merle Travis, the Chad Mitchell Trio, Bill Monroe, Patsy Montana, Willie Nelson, the Nitty Gritty Dirt Band, Dolly Parton, Boots Randolph, Jerry Reed, Don Reno, Jean Ritchie, Leon Russell, the Secret Sisters, Pete Seeger, Hank Snow, Kay Starr, Kay Starr, Billy Strange, Merle Travis, Ernest Tubb, Townes Van Zandt, the Ventures, Doc Watson, Bob Weir, Lawrence Welk, Hank Williams, Mac Wiseman, the Wood Brothers, Glenn Yarbrough, Dan Zanes
- "Waitin' for the Train to Come In" (Sunny Skylar, Martin Block) by Harry James and Kitty Kallen, Helen Forrest, Buddy Johnson, Peggy Lee, Johnny Long, Louis Prima
- "Waiting for a Train" by Flash and the Pan
- "Waiting for a Train" (Jimmie Rodgers) by Duane Allman, Gene Autry, Beck, Roy Book Binder, Johnny Cash, Michael Chapman, David Allan Coe, Dick Curless, Ramblin' Jack Elliott, Merle Haggard, Mississippi John Hurt, Sonny James, Grandpa Jones, Furry Lewis, Jerry Lee Lewis, Charlie Louvin, Katy Moffatt, Jim Reeves, Jimmie Rodgers, Boz Scaggs, John Sebastian, Hank Snow, Ernest Tubb
- "Waiting for the End of the World" (Elvis Costello) by Elvis Costello
- "Waiting on the '103'" by Dan Hicks and His Hot Licks
- "Walkin' Down the Line" (Bob Dylan) by the Country Gentlemen, Bob Dylan
- "Watchman's Gone, The" (Gordon Lightfoot) by Gordon Lightfoot
- "Wave the Flag and Stop the Train" (Roy Wood) by the Move
- "Way Out in Idaho" (Traditional) by Rosalie Sorrels, Blaine Stubblefield
- "Way Out There" (Bob Nolan) by Bill Boyd, Carter Burwell, Slim Dusty, Arlo Guthrie and Pete Seeger, Cisco Houston, Seamus Kennedy, Michael Martin Murphey, New Riders of the Purple Sage, Gene Parsons, Utah Phillips, Riley Puckett, Riders in the Sky, Marty Robbins, Pete Seeger, Hank Snow, the Sons of the Pioneers
- "Weathered Old Caboose Behind the Train, The" (Norman Blake) by Norman Blake
- "Western Hobo, The" (A.P. Carter) by the Carter Family
- "What Am I Doing Hangin' 'Round?" (Michael Martin Murphey and Owen Castleman) by the Monkees, Michael Martin Murphey
- "What Ever Happened to the Caboose?" by the Altar Billies, written by Michael W Stand (ASCAP),
- "When My Train Pulls In" by Gary Clark Jr.
- "When the Golden Train Comes Down" (Bob Nolan) by the Sons of the Pioneers
- "When the Midnight Choo-Choo Leaves for Alabam'" (Irving Berlin), published 1912, by Arthur Collins and Byron G. Harlan (1912). Performed in films by the following artists: Alice Faye, Alexander's Ragtime Band, 1938; Fred Astaire and Judy Garland, Easter Parade, 1948; Ethel Merman, Dan Dailey, Mitzi Gaynor and Donald O'Connor, There's No Business Like Show Business, 1954
- "When the Train Comes Along" by Henry Thomas
- "Whiskey Train" by Procol Harum
- "Whistlin' Past the Graveyard" (Tom Waits) by Tom Waits
- "White Man Singin' the Blues" (Merle Haggard) by Merle Haggard
- "Whitewash Station Blues" (Jab Jones, Will Shade) by Memphis Jug Band (1928)
- "Will-o-the-wisp" by Pet Shop Boys
- "Woman on a Train" by the Fixx (1984)
- "Woody and Dutch on the Slow Train to Peking" (Rickie Lee Jones, David Kalish) by Rickie Lee Jones
- "Worried Man Blues" (Traditional), also known as "It Takes a Worried Man", by Bill Anderson, Bobby Bare, the Blue Sky Boys, the Carter Family, Johnny Cash, June Carter Cash, Devo, Disappear Fear, Lonnie Donegan, Ramblin' Jack Elliott, Flatt & Scruggs, Blind Boy Fuller, Woody Guthrie, Lena Horne, Burl Ives, Jim & Jesse, George Jones, Tom Jones, the Kingston Trio, Sleepy LaBeef, Laurie Lewis, Charlie Louvin, Brownie McGhee and Sonny Terry, Van Morrison, Elliott Murphy, New Lost City Ramblers, Osborne Brothers, Don Reno, Peggy and Mike Seeger, Pete Seeger, the Seekers, Ralph Stanley, Stray Cats, Tampa Red, Mel Tillis, Ben Vaughn, Big Joe Williams, Johnny Williams
- "Wreck between New Hope and Gethsemane" by Doc Hopkins
- "Wreck of the 1256, The" (Carson Robison), also known as "Train 1256", by Vernon Dalhart (1925), Curly Fox
- "Wreck of the 1262", (Fred Tait-Douglas, Carson Robison), also known as "The Freight Wreck at Altoona", by Vernon Dalhart (1926), Curly Fox, Riley Puckett (1937), Earl Scruggs and Lester Flatt, Doc and Merle Watson
- "Wreck of the C & O Number Five, The" (lyrics Cleburne C. Meeks, 1926; music Carson J. Robison, 1927) by Vernon Dalhart, Pick Temple, Mac Wiseman
- "Wreck of the G & SI" by Happy Bud Harrison
- "Wreck of the L & N" (Traditional, related to "Wreck on the C & O") by Phipps Family
- "Wreck of the N & W Cannonball" (Cleburn C. Meeks, Carson Robison) by Vernon Dalhart
- "Wreck of the Number Nine, The" (Carson Robison, 1927) by Vernon Dalhart and Frank Luther, Jim & Jesse McReynolds, J.E. Mainer's Mountaineers, Jim Reeves, Tex Ritter, Hank Snow, Rosalie Sorrels, Mark Spoelstra, Ernest Stoneman, Doc Watson
- "Wreck of the Old 49" (Shel Silverstein) by Shel Silverstein, the Smothers Brothers, Uncle Shelby
- "Wreck of the Old 97" (attributed to Charles Noell and Fred Jackson Lewey) by Roy Acuff, Pink Anderson, Boxcar Willie, Johnny Cash, Vernon Dalhart, Lonnie Donegan, Ramblin' Jack Elliott, Flatt & Scruggs, G. B. Grayson and Henry Whitter, Woody Guthrie, Frank Hutchison, George Reneau, Reno and Smiley,Pete Seeger, Kate Smith, Hank Snow, Muggsy Spanier, Billy Strange, Ernest Thompson
- "Wreck of the Royal Palm Express, The" (Andrew Jenkins) by Vernon Dalhart, Joe Glazer, Andrew Jenkins, Frank Luther
- "Wreck of the Shenandoah" (Carson Robison) by Vernon Dalhart with Carson Robison and Lou Raderman (1925)
- "The Wreck of the Virginian Train" by John Hutchens
- "Wreck of the Virginian Number 3, The" (Blind Alfred Reed, 1927) by Roy Harvey with Charlie Poole and the North Carolina Ramblers, Blind Alfred Reed
- "Wreck on the C & O, The" (Unknown), basis for "Engine 143" and "F.F.V.", earliest printing 1913, by John Allison, George Reneau and Gene Austin (1924), Ernest Stoneman (1925)

== Y ==
- "Yellow Dog Rag" (W. C. Handy), published 1914, by Johnny Maddox
- "Yin and Yang (The Flowerpot Man)" by Love and Rockets
- "You Never Even Called Me by My Name" by Steve Goodman and John Prine
- "Your Good Man Caught the Train and Gone" by Mississippi Sheiks

== Z ==
- "Zenevonat" by Lokomotiv GT
- "Zion Train" by Bob Marley and the Wailers
- "Zoo Station" by U2
