= Roy Harvey =

Roy Harvey may refer to:

- Roy Harvey (politician)
- Roy Harvey (musician)
