= Paul Lingle =

American jazz musician

Paul Lingle (December 3, 1902, Denver, Colorado - October 30, 1963 Honolulu, Hawaii) was an American jazz pianist. Terry Waldo, in "This is Ragtime", described Lingle as "an extremely important figure in the history of ragtime" for his "interpretations of the music were possibly the finest that have ever been done."

Lingle began on piano at age six and first played professionally in the San Francisco area in the 1920s. He accompanied Al Jolson often in the late 1920s, including for his film soundtracks. In the 1930s he worked mainly on radio, and also played with Al Zohn's band. He tuned pianos early in the 1940s and worked as a soloist in local San Francisco clubs, accompanying visiting musicians such as Lead Belly and Bunk Johnson. He moved to Honolulu in 1952, where he played until his death.

Lingle released almost no recorded material during his lifetime, doing only one session for Good Time Jazz in 1952. This session for Good Time Jazz produced eight recorded numbers. After his death, Euphonic Records released several volumes of private recordings which were critically acclaimed.
