= Terry Garland =

American singer (1953–2021)

- Born: Terry Ray Garland; June 3, 1953; Johnson City, Tennessee, United States
- Died: September 19, 2021 (aged 68) Richmond, Virginia, U.S.
- Genres: Blues
- Occupation(s): Guitarist, singer, songwriter
- Instrument(s): Guitar, vocals
- Years active: Late 1980s–2021
- Labels: BMG/First Warning, Planetary, Silvermoon
- Website: Official website

Terry Ray Garland (June 3, 1953 – September 19, 2021), who was born in Johnson City, Tennessee, was an American blues guitarist, songwriter and singer. The Allmusic journalist Niles J. Frantz wrote that Garland was "a country blues interpreter who plays a National steel guitar, often with a slide, in the style of Bukka White and Fred McDowell."

== Biography ==
His first two albums were released by BMG/First Warning.

The harmonica player Mark Wenner, of the Nighthawks contributed to Garland's records.

His next release was Whistling in the Dark, issued in 2006.

Terry Garland died of congestive heart failure, at the age of 68, in September 2021.

== Discography ==
- Trouble in Mind (1991)
- Edge of the Valley (1992)
- The One to Blame (1996)
- Out Where the Blue Begins (2001)
- Whistling in the Dark (2006)
- Live at the Canal Club (live album with L'il Ronnie) (2010)
- Rewired (2013)

== See also ==
- List of country blues musicians
- List of slide guitarists
