= Philip Antony Corri =

Scottish composer

Philip Antony Corri (also Arthur Clifton; 1784–1832) was a composer, born in Edinburgh and later working in London and Baltimore, Maryland. He began composing in 1802. He helped to found the London Philharmonic Society and the Royal Academy of Music.

By the 1820s, however, Corri had adopted the name Arthur Clifton and settled in Baltimore, where he was a church organist and active in the local theater. He wrote on music teaching methods and composed various pieces, most importantly an opera called The Enterprise.
