= James Reams =

American bluegrass musician

James Calvin Reams (born January 10, 1956) is an American guitarist and member of the musical group James Reams & The Barnstormers. He has performed for over 20 years and is widely known as an "Ambassador of Bluegrass" for his dedication to bluegrass and oldtime music.

== Biography ==
Originally from Kentucky and moved to Brooklyn, he continued to perform and record blue grass and old time music and created a festival in New York City, a one of a kind event that offers workshops and performances in bluegrass and old time music. During his music career, he has earned nicknames because of his efforts, Reams has been called the "Father of Brooklyn Bluegrass" and "Kentucky Songbird". Being from Kentucky, he was surrounded by music enthusiasts and musicians that have influenced his music. He currently resides in Litchfield Park, Arizona.

== Bluegrass Oldtime Music Jamboree ==
In 1998, James Reams organized the Park Slope Bluegrass Oldtime Music Jamboree, an annual festival in Brooklyn, New York, at the Brooklyn Society of Ethical Culture Meeting House.

== Discography ==
- 1994: Kentucky Songbird (Leghorn Music)
- 2000: The Blackest Crow (Mountain Redbird Music)
- 2000: The Mysterious Redbirds (Mountain Redbird Music)
- 2001: Barnstormin' (Copper Creek Records)
- 2002: James Reams, Walter Hensley & The Barons of Bluegrass (Copper Creek Records)
- 2005: Troubled Times (Mountain Redbird Music) with the Barnstormers
- 2006: Wild Card (Mountain Redbird Music)
- 2011: One Foot In The Honky Tonk (Mountain Redbird Music) with the Barnstormers
- 2016: Rhyme & Season (Mountain Redbird Music)
- 2022: Like A Flowing River & Soundtrack Album (Mountain Redbird Music)
