= Roy Harvey (musician) =

American singer-songwriter (1892–1958)

- Also known as: Roy Harper, John Martin
- Born: March 4, 1892; Greenville, Monroe County, West Virginia
- Died: July 11, 1958 (aged 66) Florida
- Genres: Old time, bluegrass
- Occupations: Musician, singer, songwriter
- Instruments: Guitar, vocals
- Years active: 1926–31
- Formerly of: Charlie Poole & the North Country Ramblers

Roy Cecil Harvey (March 24, 1892 – July 11, 1958) was an American old time guitar player, singer and songwriter. He was the guitarist with Charlie Poole and the North Carolina Ramblers and also recorded on his own, appearing on more than 200 records between 1926 and 1931.

== Musical career ==
MilwaukeeBlues2

Harvey was born in Greenville, Monroe County in southeastern West Virginia on March 24, 1892. He played guitar from an early age, but spent much of his youth and early adulthood as a worker for the Virginian Railway, starting as a fireman and eventually becoming the railroad's youngest engineer. In 1923, he lost his job after walking out during a rail strike. Two years later, while operating a streetcar, he struck up a friendship with Charlie Poole and two other members of the North Carolina Ramblers. At the time, he was also working as a salesman in a music shop, where he supplemented his musical knowledge by becoming familiar with the day's most popular records, as well as sheet music dating back to the previous century. Harvey began playing with the North Carolina Ramblers in 1926. An astute businessman, he also recorded on his own for Columbia Records, backed by other seasoned hillbilly musicians. Harvey's most significant recordings were made in 1929 and 1930. He cut his last records the next year and drifted off into obscurity.

== Final years ==
During the Great Depression, Harvey worked as a police officer and newspaperman. In 1942, he re-located to Florida, falling back on his former expertise in operating trains. He died on July 11, 1958, while still employed by the Florida East Coast Railway, his musical legacy virtually forgotten. In 1999, Old Homestead released a 24-song compilation Early String Band Favorites. A four-volume set featuring 94 of his songs from 1926 to 1931 was released by Document Records in 2001.
