= List of centenarians (musicians, composers and music patrons) =

The following is a list of centenarians – specifically, people who became famous as musicians/singers, composers and music patrons – known for reasons other than their longevity. For more lists, see: Lists of centenarians.

All supercentenarians (above 110 years old)
Living

Name	Lifespan	Age	Reason for notability
Claude Abadie	1920–2020	100	French jazz clarinetist and bandleader
Lee Adams	1924–	102	American musical theatre lyricist
Frances Adaskin	1900–2001	100	Canadian pianist
Adele Addison	1925–	101	American soprano
Licia Albanese	1909–2014	105	Italian-born American operatic soprano
Pol Albrecht	1874–1975	100	Luxembourgish composer
Fedora Alemán	1912–2018	105	Venezuelan singer
Van Alexander	1915–2015	100	American bandleader, arranger and composer
Marshall Allen	1924–	102	American saxophonist and bandleader
Bartolo Alvarez	1914–2017	102	Puerto Rican musician
Robert Alexander Anderson	1894–1995	100	American composer
Katja Andy	1907–2013	106	German-American classical pianist and piano professor
Ray Anthony	1922–	104	American bandleader, trumpeter, songwriter, and actor
Walter Arlen	1920–2023	103	American composer
Svend Asmussen	1916–2017	100	Danish jazz violinist
Gopiram Bargayn Burabhakat	1925–2026	101	Indian Sattriya artist
Dave Bartholomew	1918–2019	100	American musician, bandleader and composer
Bethany Beardslee	1925–	100	American soprano
Irving Berlin	1888–1989	101	Russian-American composer and lyricist
Ralph Berkowitz	1910–2011	100	American composer and classical pianist
Bernard Bierman	1908–2012	104	American composer
Esther Borja	1913–2013	100	Cuban singer
David Botwinik	1920–2022	101	Lithuanian-born Canadian composer
José Bragato	1915–2017	101	Italian-born Argentine cellist, composer, conductor, arranger and musical archivist
Slim Bryant	1908–2010	101	American country music singer-songwriter
Charles Burrell	1920–2025	104	American jazz bassist
Henri Büsser	1872–1973	101	French classical composer, conductor and organist
Emil Cadkin	1920–2020	100	American TV and film composer
Irving Caesar	1895–1996	101	American lyricist and theatre composer
Matilde Capuis	1913–2017	104	Italian organist, pianist, music educator and composer
Elliott Carter	1908–2012	103	American classical composer
Alice Chalifoux	1908–2008	100	American harpist
Gina Cigna	1900–2001	101	Italian soprano
Helen Clare	1916–2018	101	British singer
Orlando Cole	1908–2010	101	American cellist
Chris Columbus	1902–2002	100	American jazz drummer
Anton Coppola	1917–2020	102	American opera conductor and composer
Hugues Cuénod	1902–2010	108	Swiss tenor
Jean Cussac	1922–2026	103	French baritone and music director
Thanga Darlong	1920–2023	103	Indian folk musician
Deva Dassy	1911–2016	104	French mezzo-soprano
Jimmie Davis	1899–2000	101	American singer-songwriter
Vincent DeRosa	1920–2022	101	American hornist
Annette Richardson Dinwoodey	1906–2007	100	American Latter Day Saint vocalist
Renée Doria	1921–2021	100	French operatic soprano
Roy Douglas	1907–2015	107	British composer and pianist
Helena Dunicz-Niwińska	1915–2018	102	Polish violinist, translator and author.
Jan Ekier	1913–2014	100	Polish pianist and composer
Hellmut Federhofer	1911–2014	102	Austrian musicologist
Maria Zhorella Fedorova	1915–2017	101	Austrian-born American soprano
Lionel Ferbos	1911–2014	103	American jazz trumpeter
Irving Fields	1915–2016	101	American pianist
Paul Le Flem	1881–1984	103	French composer
Anthony Galla-Rini	1904–2006	102	American accordionist
Manuel García	1805–1906	101	Spanish baritone and singing teacher
John Gerrish	1910–2010	100	American composer
Terry Gibbs	1924–	102	American jazz vibraphonist and band leader
Peggy Gilbert	1905–2007	102	American jazz saxophonist
Coleridge Goode	1914–2015	100	Jamaican-born British jazz bassist
Sidonie Goossens	1899–2004	105	British harpist
Stella Greka	1922–2025	102	Greek singer and actress
Kaiti Grey	1924–2025	100	Greek singer and actress
Doreen Hall	1921–2025	103	Canadian violinist
Violet Hensley	1916–2026	109	American old time fiddler and luthier
Roy Henderson	1899–2000	100	Scottish baritone
Alice Herz-Sommer	1903–2014	110	Austro-Hungarian-born pianist and one of the oldest Holocaust survivors
Randolph Hokanson	1915–2018	103	American pianist
Dolores Hope	1909–2011	102	American singer and philanthropist; wife of Bob Hope
Mieczysław Horszowski	1892–1993	100	Polish pianist
Francis Jackson	1917–2022	104	British organist, choral director and composer
Herb Jeffries	1913–2014	100	American singer and actor
Judy Johnson	1924–2025	100	American pop singer
Betsy Jolas	1926–	100	French-American composer
Maurice Journeau	1898–1999	100	French composer
George Katsaros	1888–1997	108	Greek-American musician
Abdul Rashid Khan	1908–2016	107	Indian musician
Phyllis Kinney	1922–2026	103	American-born singer and historian of Welsh folk music
Hilkka Kinnunen	1925–2026	101	Finnish actress and opera singer
Mykola Kolessa	1903–2006	102	Ukrainian composer
György Kurtág	1926–	100	Hungarian composer
Pierre Labric	1921–	105	French organist and composer
Marcelle de Lacour	1896–1997	100	French harpsichordist
Marjorie Lane	1912–2012	100	American singer
Margaret Ruthven Lang	1867–1972	104	American composer
Johnny Lange	1905–2006	100	American Academy Award-nominated songwriter
Anita Lasker-Wallfisch	1925–	101	German-British cellist
André Lavagne	1913–2014	100	French composer
Leo Leandros	1923–2025	102	Greek musician, composer, singer, songwriter, lyricist and record producer
Dave Lee	1926–	100	British jazz pianist
Everett Lee	1916–2022	105	American conductor and violinist
Mary Lee	1921–2022	100	Scottish singer
Matti Lehtinen	1922–2022	100	Finnish baritone singer
Conrad Leonard	1898–2003	104	British pianist and composer
Gisela Litz	1922–2023	100	German contralto opera singer
Huey Long	1904–2009	105	American jazz singer
Lawrence Lucie	1907–2009	101	American jazz musician
Alice Ludes	1912–2017	104	American singer
Nonie Lynch	1910–2011	101	Irish singer
Dame Vera Lynn	1917–2020	103	British actress, singer and songwriter
Stanislav Lyudkevych	1879–1979	100	Ukrainian composer
Wade Mainer	1907–2011	104	American country music singer and banjoist
Léo Marjane	1912–2016	104	French singer
Robert Massard	1925–2025	100	French operatic baritone
Draga Matković	1907–2013	105	German classical pianist
Sir Robert Mayer	1879–1985	105	German-born British music patron and philanthropist
Albert J. McNeil	1920–2022	102	American choral conductor, ethnomusicologist and author
Kirke Mechem	1925–	101	American composer
Buddy Moreno	1912–2015	103	American singer, bandleader and radio personality
Jane Morgan	1924–2025	101	American singer and recording artist
Blanche Honegger Moyse	1909–2011	101	Swiss-born American conductor
Marcel Mule	1901–2001	100	French classical saxophonist
Alfredo Diez Nieto	1918–2021	102	Cuban composer and conductor
Phil Nimmons	1923–2024	100	Canadian jazz musician and composer
Magda Olivero	1910–2014	104	Italian soprano
Lia Origoni	1919–2022	103	Italian singer
Leo Ornstein	1895–2002	106	Ukrainian-born American pianist and composer
Uncle Charlie Osborne	1890–1992	101	American Appalachian Mountains musician
Aldo Parisot	1918–2018	100	Brazilian-born American cellist
Johnny Pate	1923–	102	American jazz bassist and record producer/arranger
Ernest "Doc" Paulin	1907–2007	100	American brass band leader
Alf Pearson	1910–2012	102	British variety singer
Bill Pitman	1920–2022	102	American guitarist and session musician (The Wrecking Crew)
Andreja Preger	1912–2015	103	Austro-Hungarian-born Yugoslav and Serbian pianist
Harry Rabinowitz	1916–2016	100	British film and television composer
Sid Ramin	1919–2019	100	American orchestrator, arranger and composer
H. Owen Reed	1910–2014	103	American composer, conductor and author
Elsa Respighi	1894–1996	101	Italian composer and singer; wife of fellow composer Ottorino Respighi
Lívia Rév	1916–2018	101	Hungarian classical concert pianist
Rosa Rio	1902–2010	107	American organist
Diamantina Rodríguez	1920–2021	100	Spanish singer
Edmundo Ros	1910–2011	100	Trinidadian musician, vocalist and bandleader
Thomas Round	1915–2016	100	British opera singer
Olga Rudge	1895–1996	100	American violinist
Art Rupe	1917–2022	104	American record producer and founder of Specialty Records
Joseph Salemi	1902–2003	100	American jazz trombonist
Horacio Salgán	1916–2016	100	Argentine composer and pianist
Margaret Vardell Sandresky	1921–	105	American composer, organist and teacher
Teresa Saporiti	1763–1869	106	Italian soprano
María Teresa Linares Savio	1920–2021	100	Cuban musicologist
Luther Saxon	1916–2017	101	American singer
Cecilia Seghizzi	1908–2019	111	Italian composer
Zdeněk Šesták	1925–2026	100	Czech composer
George Beverly Shea	1909–2013	104	Canadian-born American gospel music singer and songwriter
Shep Shepherd	1917–2018	101	American multi-instrumental jazz musician and composer
Mervin Shiner	1921–2023	102	American country singer, songwriter and guitarist
Ed Simons	1917–2018	101	American conductor
Hal Singer	1919–2020	100	American bandleader and saxophonist
Ruth Slenczynska	1925–2026	101	American pianist
Nicolas Slonimsky	1894–1995	101	Russian-American composer and conductor
Viola Smith	1912–2020	107	American musician
Eleanor Sokoloff	1914–2020	106	American pianist
Leif Solberg	1914–2016	101	Norwegian classical composer and organist
Ljerko Spiller	1908–2008	100	Croatian and Argentine violinist
Laila Storch	1921–2022	101	American oboist
Sally Sweetland	1911–2015	103	American soprano
Jenő Takács	1902–2005	103	Austro-Hungarian composer and pianist
Bill Tapia	1908–2011	103	American musician
Tillit Sidney Teddlie	1885–1987	102	American hymn composer
Louise Tobin	1918–2022	104	American singer
Roman Toi	1916–2018	101	Estonian-Canadian composer, choir conductor and organist
Juan Vicente Torrealba	1917–2019	102	Venezuelan harpist and composer
Roman Totenberg	1911–2012	101	Polish-born American violinist and educator
Orrin Tucker	1911–2011	100	American bandleader and composer
İlhan Usmanbaş	1921–2025	103	Turkish classical composer
Stanley Vann	1910–2010	100	British composer
Bea Wain	1917–2017	100	American vocalist and big band singer
Elisabeth Waldo	1918–2026	107	American violinist, composer, songwriter, conductor and ethnomusicologist
Dame Fanny Waterman	1920–2020	100	English pianist and educator
Stephen Wilkinson	1919–2021	102	British choral conductor and composer
Irv Williams	1919–2019	100	American jazz saxophonist and composer
Elder Roma Wilson	1910–2018	107	American gospel harmonicist
Helmut Winschermann	1920–2021	100	German classical oboist, conductor and academic teacher
Izabella Yurieva	1899–2000	100	Russian singer
Hilde Zadek	1917–2019	101	German operatic soprano
Renato Zanettovich	1921–2021	100	Italian violinist and teacher
Aleksandr Zatsepin	1926–	100	Russian composer
Julien-François Zbinden	1917–2021	103	Swiss composer and jazz pianist
Izabella Zielińska	1910–2017	106	Polish pianist
