= List of semi-supercentenarians (actors, filmmakers and entertainers) =

The following is a list of semi-supercentenarians (Note: A semi-supercentenarian is someone aged 105–109) – specifically, people who became famous as actors, filmmakers and entertainers – known for reasons other than their longevity. For more lists, see lists of centenarians.

Living

Name	Lifespan	Age	Reason for Notability
Yavar Abbas	1920–	105	British-Indian filmmaker, broadcaster, writer, producer, and camera operator
George Abbott	1887–1995	107	American stage actor, director, playwright, screenwriter and producer
Rosa Albach-Retty	1874–1980	105	Austrian film and stage actress
Eileen Bennett	1919–2025	105	British film and stage actress; mother of actor Nicholas Hammond
Pappukutty Bhagavathar	1913–2020	107	Indian actor and singer
Susanna Bokoyni	1879–1984	105	Hungarian circus performer
Rosa Bouglione	1910–2018	107	French circus performer
Georgia Burke	1878–1985	107	American film actress
María Cristina Camilo	1917–2025	107	Dominican actress
Horacio Coppola	1906–2012	105	Argentine photographer and filmmaker
Caren Marsh Doll	1919–	107	American actress and dancer
Mary Ellis	1897–2003	105	American-born British stage actress
Beulah Garrick	1921–	105	British actress
Pierre Gérald	1906–2012	105	French actor
Julie Gibson	1913–2019	106	American actress and singer
Liane Haid	1895–2000	105	Austrian actress
Maj-Britt Håkansson	1919–	107	Swedish actress
Johannes Heesters	1903–2011	108	Dutch actor, vocalist and performer
Minoru Inuzuka	1901–2007	106	Japanese film director and screenwriter
Elisabeth Kirkby	1921–2026	105	British-born Australian politician, actress, radio broadcaster, producer, director and screenwriter
Norman Lloyd	1914–2021	106	American actor, director, producer and writer
Don Lusk	1913–2018	105	American animator
Lincoln Maazel	1903–2009	106	American actor and singer; father of conductor Lorin Maazel
Carmen Martínez Sierra	1904–2012	108	Spanish actress
Madeleine Milhaud	1902–2008	105	French actress and librettist; wife of composer Darius Milhaud
Miguel Morayta	1907–2013	105	Spanish-born Mexican film director
Dolores Muñoz Ledo	1918–2026	107	Mexican voice actress
Gladys O'Connor	1903–2012	108	British-Canadian actress
Manoel de Oliveira	1908–2015	106	Portuguese film director
Milton Quon	1913–2019	105	American animator, artist and actor
Helen Reichert	1901–2011	109	American talk show personality and professor
Francis Rigaud	1920–2026	106	French film director, writer and producer
Gerda Ring	1891–1999	107	Norwegian stage actress and producer
Yutaka Sada	1911–2017	106	Japanese actor
Connie Sawyer	1912–2018	105	American actress
Tonio Selwart	1896–2002	106	German actor and stage performer
Run Run Shaw	1907–2014	106	Hong Kong businessman, filmmaker and philanthropist
Renée Simonot	1911–2021	109	French actress and voice artist; mother of actress Catherine Deneuve
June Spencer	1919–2024	105	British radio actress
Helli Stehle	1907–2017	109	Swiss actress and radio presenter
Lupita Tovar	1910–2016	106	Mexican-American actress
Doris Eaton Travis	1904–2010	106	American actress and dance instructor; last surviving Ziegfeld girl
Mary Ward Breheny	1915–2021	106	Australian actress and radio broadcaster
Frances Wessells	1919–2024	105	American dancer and choreographer
Norrie Woodhall	1905–2011	105	British stage actress
Patricia Wright	1921–	105	American actress

== See also ==
- List of centenarians (actors, filmmakers and entertainers)
- List of supercentenarians (actors, filmmakers and entertainers)
