= Stehle =

Stehle is a German surname. Notable people with the surname include:

- Adelina Stehle (1860-1945), Austrian-Italian opera singer
- Chelo Alvarez-Stehle, Spanish-American journalist and documentary filmmaker
- Dominik Stehle (born 1986), German alpine ski racer
- Emilio Lorenzo Stehle (1926-2017), German-Ecuadorian Catholic bishop
- Evi Sachenbacher-Stehle (born 1980), German cross-country skier and biathlete
- Helli Stehle (1907-2017), Swiss actress and radio presenter
- Simon Stehle (born 2001), German footballer
- Sophie Stehle (1838-1921), German opera singer
- Thomas Stehle (born 1980), German footballer
