= List of centenarians (actors, filmmakers and entertainers) =

The following is a list of centenarians (Note: This list is for people aged 100–104. For semi-supercentenarians (105–109) and supercentenarians (110+), see List of semi-supercentenarians (actors, filmmakers and entertainers) and List of supercentenarians (actors, filmmakers and entertainers).) – specifically, people who became famous as actors, filmmakers and entertainers – known for reasons other than their longevity. For more lists, see lists of centenarians.

Living

Name	Lifespan	Age	Reason for notability
Sylva Åkesson	1916–2021	104	Swedish actress
Lewis Alexander	1910–2010	100	English actor
Jenny Alpha	1910–2010	100	French Martinican actress and singer
Lukas Ammann	1912–2017	104	Swiss actor
Nina Andrycz	1912–2014	101	Polish actress
Nikolay Annenkov	1899–1999	100	Soviet-Russian actor
Ray Anthony	1922–	104	American bandleader, trumpeter, songwriter and actor
Neal Arden	1909–2014	104	English actor and writer
Svend Asmussen	1916–2017	100	Danish jazz violinist
David Attenborough	1926–	100	English broadcaster and natural historian
Brigitte Auber	1925–	101	French actress
Vincent Ball	1923–	102	Australian actor
Richard L. Bare	1913–2015	101	American motion picture and television director
Gopiram Bargayn Burabhakat	1925–2026	101	Indian Sattriya artist
Etta Moten Barnett	1901–2004	102	American stage actress and singer
Dave Bartholomew	1918–2019	100	American musician, bandleader, composer, arranger and record producer
Margaret Barton	1926–	100	British actress
Norma Barzman	1920–2023	103	American screenwriter
Peggy Batchelor	1916–2020	103	British actress
Sam Beazley	1916–2017	101	British actor
Michael Beint	1925–2026	100	English actor
Amelia Bence	1914–2016	101	Argentine film actress
Bruce Bennett	1906–2007	100	American actor and Olympic athlete
Irving Benson	1914–2016	102	American actor
Peter Berkos	1922–2024	101	American sound editor
Hilda Bernard	1920–2022	101	Argentine actress
Eva von Berne	1910–2010	100	Austrian film actress
Walter Bernstein	1919–2021	101	American screenwriter and film producer
Janette Bertrand	1925–	101	Canadian journalist, actress, educator, and writer
Smriti Biswas	1924–2024	100	Indian actress
Stella Bloch	1897–1999	101	American dancer
Margaret Booth	1898–2002	104	American film editor
Osmond Borradaile	1898–1999	100	Canadian cameraman and cinematographer
Anna Maria Bottini	1916–2020	104	Italian actress
Robert F. Boyle	1909–2010	100	American art director and production designer
Carlo Ludovico Bragaglia	1894–1998	103	Italian film director and screenwriter
José Bragato	1915–2017	101	Italian-born Argentine cellist, composer, conductor, arranger and musical archivist
Artur Brauner	1918–2019	100	German film producer
Renate Brausewetter	1905–2006	100	German silent film actress
Helen Bray	1889–1990	100	American actress
Betty Brodel	1920–2024	104	American actress
Oscar Brodney	1907–2008	100	American screenwriter
Mel Brooks	1926–	100	American actor, filmmaker, comedian, songwriter, and playwright
Mona Bruns	1899–2000	100	American actress
Zoya Bulgakova	1914–2017	102	Soviet-Russian stage actress
George Burns	1896–1996	100	American actor and comedian
Helen Burns	1916–2018	101	British actress
Bill Butler	1921–2023	101	American cinematographer
Anne Buydens	1919–2021	102	American philanthropist and film producer
John Calvert	1911–2013	102	American magician
Earl Cameron	1917–2020	102	Bermudian-born British actor
Anna Campori	1917–2018	100	Italian actress
Mary Carlisle	1914–2018	104	American actress
Diana Serra Cary	1918–2020	101	American silent film child actress (known as "Baby Peggy"), author and cinema historian
Christian Casadesus	1912–2014	101	French actor; brother of fellow actress and centenarian Gisèle Casadesus
Gisèle Casadesus	1914–2017	103	French actress; sister of fellow actor and centenarian Christian Casadesus
Wally Cassell	1912–2015	103	Italian-born American character actor and businessman
Raymond Cauchetier	1920–2021	101	French photographer (French New Wave films)
Marge Champion	1919–2020	101	American dancer, choreographer and actress
Juli Lynne Charlot	1922–2024	101	American actress, singer and fashion designer
Geoffrey Chater	1921–2021	100	British actor
Chen Liting	1910–2013	102	Chinese playwright, drama and film director
Angela Clarke	1909–2010	101	American actress
Irwin Corey	1914–2017	102	American comedian
Norman Corwin	1910–2011	101	American screenwriter and producer
Nelma Costa	1922–2023	101	Brazilian actress
Maria Ribeiro (atriz, 1923)	1923–2025	102	Brazilian actress
Diosa Costello	1913–2013	100	American entertainer
Teresa Cunillé	1924–	102	Spanish actress
Louise Currie	1913–2013	100	American film actress
Leila Danette	1909–2012	103	American actress
Henry Danton	1919–2022	102	British dancer
Robert Darène	1914–2016	102	French actor, film director and screenwriter
Sasa Dario	1926–	100	Greek dancer of the Greek National Opera, actress and dance critic
Danielle Darrieux	1917–2017	100	French actress
Jimmie Davis	1899–2000	101	American singer and songwriter
Olivia de Havilland	1916–2020	104	British-born American film actress
Gloria Dea	1922–2023	100	American actress, dancer and magician
Margia Dean	1922–2023	101	American beauty queen and stage and screen actress
Suzy Delair	1917–2020	102	French actress, dancer and singer
Rosine Delamare	1911–2013	101	French Oscar-nominated costume designer
Jean Delannoy	1908–2008	100	French actor and film director
Frances Dewey Wormser	1903–2008	104	American stage actress
Dorothy Dickson	1893–1995	102	American-British stage actress
Tommy Dix	1923–2025	101	American actor and singer
Kirk Douglas	1916–2020	103	American film actor and producer
Ellen Albertini Dow	1913–2015	101	American character actress
Orlando Drummond	1919–2021	101	Brazilian stage, television and film actor
Claire Du Brey	1892–1993	100	American film actress
Paulette Dubost	1910–2011	100	French actress
Marta Eggerth	1912–2013	101	Hungarian actress and singer
Jean Erdman	1916–2020	104	American dancer
Marilyn Erskine	1926–	100	American actress
Carl Esmond	1902–2004	102	Austrian-American actor
Irving Fein	1911–2012	101	American television and film producer
Gwen Ffrangcon-Davies	1891–1992	101	British actress
Gunnar Fischer	1910–2011	100	Swedish cinematographer
Rina Franchetti	1907–2010	102	Italian actress
David Frankham	1926–	100	British actor
Elissa Minet Fuchs	1919–2023	103	American ballerina and choreographer
Barbra Fuller	1921–2024	102	American actress
Takumi Furukawa	1917–2018	101	Japanese film director
Arthur Gardner	1910–2014	104	American television producer
Hal Geer	1916–2017	100	American producer and filmmaker
Annie Geeraerts	1926–	100	Belgian actress
Ernestina Garfias	1926–	100	Mexican soprano and actress
Erwin Geschonneck	1906–2008	101	German actor
Marie Glory	1905–2009	103	French actress
Ebrahim Golestan	1922–2023	100	Iranian-British film director and writer
Dercy Gonçalves	1907–2008	101	Brazilian actress
Coleridge Goode	1914–2015	100	Jamaican-born British jazz bassist
Bert I. Gordon	1922–2023	100	American film director
Guido Gorgatti	1919–2023	103	Italian-born Argentine film actor
Karl Otto Götz	1914–2017	103	German artist, filmmaker, draughtsman/printmaker, writer and art professor
Derek Granger	1921–2022	101	British film and television producer, and screenwriter
Alda Grimaldi	1919–2023	104	Italian television director and actress
Anna Halprin	1920–2021	100	American dancer and choreographer
Stein Grieg Halvorsen	1909–2013	104	Norwegian actor
Charmienne Harker	1924–2026	102	American actress, model and dancer
Jean Harlez	1924–2026	101	Belgian film director
Kathleen Harrison	1892–1995	103	British actress
Ted Hartley	1924–2025	100	American actor, producer and naval fighter pilot
Shinobu Hashimoto	1918–2018	100	Japanese film director, screenwriter, and producer
Bob Hope	1903–2003	100	British-born American actor and comedian
Mieczysław Horszowski	1892–1993	100	Polish-American pianist
Shep Houghton	1914–2016	102	American actor and dancer
Yvonne Howell	1905–2010	104	American silent film actress
Marsha Hunt	1917–2022	104	American actress
Vilma Jamnická	1906–2008	101	Slovak actress
Lucy Jarvis	1917–2020	102	American television producer
Joli Jászai	1907–2008	101	Hungarian actress
Gertrude Jeannette	1914–2018	103	American actress, theatre director and producer
Herb Jeffries	1913–2014	100	American singer and actor
Glynis Johns	1923–2024	100	British actress, dancer, musician and singer
Rolands Kalniņš	1922–2022	100	Latvian film director, screenwriter and producer
Tatyana Karpova	1916–2018	102	Soviet-Russian actress
Elizabeth Kelly	1921–2025	104	British actress
Lois Kelly Miller	1917–2020	102	Jamaican actress
John Kenley	1906–2009	103	American Broadway director and producer
Barbara Kent	1907–2011	103	Canadian-born American actress
Yuriko Kikuchi	1920–2022	102	American dancer and choreographer
Hilkka Kinnunen	1925–2026	101	Finnish actress and opera singer
Robert Kinoshita	1914–2014	100	American art director
Hans F. Koenekamp	1891–1992	100	American cinematographer
Herbert Köfer	1921–2021	100	German actor
Mina Kolb	1926–	100	American actress and comedian
Ewa Krasnodebska	1925–	101	Polish actress
L. Krishnan	1922–2026	103	Indian-born Malaysian film director and screenwriter
Krishnaveni	1924–2025	100	Indian actress
Mae Laborde	1909–2012	102	American television actress
Carla Laemmle	1909–2014	104	American film actress
Guje Lagerwall	1918–2019	100	Swedish actress
Charles Lane	1905–2007	102	American character actor
Sid Laverents	1908–2009	100	American amateur filmmaker
Ray Lawler	1921–2024	103	Australian playwright
Norman Lear	1922–2023	101	American television writer and film and television producer
Nikolai Lebedev	1921–2022	100	Soviet-Russian actor
Yvette Lebon	1910–2014	103	French actress
Francis Lederer	1899–2000	100	American actor
Aleen Leslie	1908–2010	101	American screenwriter
June Lockhart	1925–2025	100	American actress
Elena Lucena	1914–2015	101	Argentine actress
Ingrid Luterkort	1910–2011	101	Swedish actress
Dora Luz	1918–2018	100	Mexican singer and recording artist
Sara Luzita	1922–2025	102	British ballet dancer
Sara Montes	1926–	100	Mexican actress
Kurt Maetzig	1911–2012	101	German film director
Maciej Maciejewski	1914–2018	103	Polish actor
Martin Magner	1900–2002	101	German-American theatre and television director and producer
Włada Majewska	1911–2011	100	Polish radio journalist, actress and singer
Tommie Manderson	1912–2015	102	British make-up artist
Juan Mariné	1920–2025	104	Spanish cinematographer and film restorer
Don Marion	1917–2020	103	American actor
Margery Mason	1913–2014	100	British actress
Leslie H. Martinson	1915–2016	101	American television and film director
Annabel Maule	1922–	104	British actress
Sherman Maxwell	1907–2008	100	American sportscaster
Peppino Mazzullo	1926–2026	100	Italian actor
Betty McGuire	1926–2026	100	American film, stage and television actress
Fay McKenzie	1918–2019	101	American actress
Joe McQueen	1919–2019	100	American jazz saxophonist
Mariuccia Medici	1910–2012	102	Italian-born Swiss actress
Benjamin Melniker	1913–2018	104	American film producer
Sheila Mercier	1919–2019	100	British actress
Doris Merrick	1919–2019	100	American actress and model
Moi-Yo Miller	1914–2018	104	Australian magician's assistant
Walter Mirisch	1921–2023	101	American film producer
Antony Mitradas	1913–2017	103	Indian film director
Igor Moiseyev	1906–2007	101	Soviet-Russian choreographer
Bettina Moissi	1923–2023	100	German actressBettina Moissi#cite note-8
Mantana Morakul	1923–2026	102	Thai singer and actress
Jane Morgan	1924–2025	101	American singer and Broadway actress
Patricia Morison	1915–2018	103	American actress
Kay Morley	1920–2020	100	American actress
George Morrison	1922–2025	102	Irish documentary filmmaker
Meg Mundy	1915–2016	101	British-born American actress
Audrey Munson	1891–1996	104	American actress and model
Pete Murray	1925–	101	British disc jockey and actor
Alexandra Myšková	1922–	104	Czech-Norwegian actress
Randi Lindtner Næss	1905–2009	104	Norwegian actress and singer
Chemancheri Kunhiraman Nair	1916–2021	104	Indian Kathakali actor
Grim Natwick	1890–1990	100	American animator
Ivan Novikoff	1899–2002	102	Russian ballet teacher
Kevin O'Morrison	1916–2016	100	American actor and playwright
Kazuo Ohno	1906–2010	103	Japanese dancer
Charles Olumo	1923–2024	100	Nigerian actor
Nelly Omar	1911–2013	102	Argentine actress and singer
Lia Origoni	1919–2022	103	Italian actress
Risto Orko	1899–2001	102	Finnish film producer and director
Juan Orrego-Salas	1919–2019	100	Chilean-American composer
Ethel Waite Owen	1893–1997	103	American actress
Janis Paige	1922–2024	101	American actress
Donald Pelmear	1924–2025	100	English actor
Emily Perry	1907–2008	100	British actress
Nehemiah Persoff	1919–2022	102	American actor
Fern Persons	1910–2012	101	American film and television actress
Tullio Pinelli	1908–2009	100	Italian playwright and screenwriter
Marc Platt	1913–2014	100	American actor and dancer
Priscilla Pointer	1924–2025	100	American actress
Olaf Pooley	1914–2015	101	British actor
Micheline Presle	1922–2024	101	French actress
Willis Pyle	1914–2016	101	American animator
Qin Yi	1922–2022	100	Chinese actress
Luise Rainer	1910–2014	104	German-born British-American Oscar-winning actress
Irving Rapper	1898–1999	101	British-American film director
Harry Redmond Jr.	1909–2011	101	American special effects artist and film producer
Connie Douglas Reeves	1901–2003	101	American cowgirl
Georgette Rejewski	1910–2014	104	Belgian-born Dutch actress
Ted Richmond	1910–2013	103	American film producer
Leni Riefenstahl	1902–2003	101	German film director
Maria Riva	1924–2025	100	American actress
Hal Roach	1892–1992	100	American film and television producer
Edith Roger	1922–2023	100	Norwegian dancer and choreographer
Zvonimir Rogoz	1887–1988	100	Croatian actor
Jack Rollins	1915–2015	100	American film producer
Jean Rouverol	1916–2017	100	American actress and screenwriter
Thelma Ruby	1925–	101	British actress
Witold Sadowy	1920–2020	100	Polish actor
Eva Marie Saint	1924–2026	102	American actress
Sol Saks	1910–2011	100	American screenwriter and producer
Paula Salomon-Lindberg	1897–2000	102	German classical contralto singer
Fada Santoro	1924–2024	100	Brazilian actress
Ivy Sawyer	1898–1999	101	American dancer, singer and actress
Hannes Schiel	1914–2017	103	Austrian actor
Rolf Schimpf	1924–2025	100	German actor
Robert C. Schnitzer	1906–2008	101	American actor, producer, educator and theater administrator
Walter Schultheiß	1924–2025	101	German actor, author and painter
Ida Schuster	1918–2020	101	British actress
Alfie Scopp	1919–2021	101	British-born Canadian actor
Miriam Seegar Whelan	1907–2011	103	American actress
Zohra Sehgal	1912–2014	102	Indian dancer and actress
Ralph Senensky	1923–2025	102	American director
Marina Semyonova	1908–2010	101	Soviet-Russian prima ballerina
Ramananda Sengupta	1916–2017	101	Indian cinematographer
Athene Seyler	1889–1990	101	British actress
Gene Shalit	1926–2026	100	American journalist, television personality, film and book critic, and author
Helen Shaw	1897–1997	100	American actress
Jane Sherman	1908–2010	101	American dancer and writer
Kaneto Shindo	1912–2012	100	Japanese film director
Helen Shingler	1919–2019	100	English film and television actress; mother of Anthony Head and Murray Head
Leonid Shvartsman	1920–2022	101	Soviet-Russian animator
Douglas Slocombe	1913–2016	103	British cinematographer
Hugh Stewart	1910–2011	100	British film editor and producer
Dorothy Stickney	1896–1998	101	American actress
Gloria Stuart	1910–2010	100	American film actress
Alan Surgal	1916–2017	100	American screenwriter
Wolfgang Suschitzky	1912–2016	104	Austrian cinematographer and photographer
Danuta Szaflarska	1915–2017	102	Polish actress
Tang Xiaodan	1910–2012	101	Chinese film director
Gianrico Tedeschi	1920–2020	100	Italian actor
Ellaline Terriss	1871–1971	100	British stage and film actress and musical performer
Nini Theilade	1915–2018	102	Danish ballet dancer, choreographer and teacher
Frank M. Thomas	1889–1989	100	American actor
Alice Toen	1924–	102	Belgian actress
Sheila S. Tomlinson	1925–2026	100	English television editor
Roman Totenberg	1911–2012	101	Polish-American violinist
Dorothy Toy	1917–2019	102	Asian-American dancer
Roger Tréville	1902–2005	102	French actor
Georg Stefan Troller	1921–2025	103	German journalist, screenwriter and director
Mabel Trunnelle	1879–1981	101	American actress
Luvsanjamtsyn Tsogzolmaa	1924–	102	Mongolian actress and singer
Morton Tubor	1917–2019	102	American film and sound editor
Franca Valeri	1920–2020	100	Italian actress
Ninette de Valois	1898–2001	102	Irish-born British dancer, teacher, choreographer and director of classical ballet; founder of The Royal Ballet in London
Dick Van Dyke	1925–	100	American actor and comedian
Otakar Vávra	1911–2011	100	Czech film director, screenwriter and pedagogue
Meta Velander	1924–2025	100	Swedish actress
Ray Verhaeghe	1926–	100	Belgian actor
Anne Vernon	1924–	102	French actress
Branka Veselinović	1918–2023	104	Serbian actress
Vija Vētra	1923–2026	103	Latvian dancer and choreographer
María Victoria	1923–	103	Mexican actress, singer and comedian
Pauline Wagner	1910–2014	103	American actress
Bea Wain	1917–2017	100	American big band singer and radio personality
Stan Waterman	1923–2023	100	American cinematographer and film producer
Laurie Webb	1924–2026	101	Welsh actor
Peggy Webber	1925–2026	100	American actress
Señor Wences	1896–1999	103	Spanish-American ventriloquist
Gösta Werner	1908–2009	101	Swedish film director
Murray Westgate	1918–2018	100	Canadian television and film actor
Jacqueline White	1922–	103	American actress
Stephen Wilkinson	1919–2021	102	British choral conductor and composer
Elmo Williams	1913–2015	102	American film and television editor
Irv Williams	1919–2019	100	American jazz saxophonist and composer
Eileen Winterton	1903–2004	100	British actress
Estelle Winwood	1883–1984	101	British stage and film actress
Woody Woodbury	1924–	102	American comic actor
Katja Wulff	1890–1992	101	Swiss expressionist dancer
Yan Jizhou	1917–2018	100	Chinese film director
Arnold Yarrow	1920–2024	104	British actor and screenwriter
Kim Yaroshevskaya	1923–2025	101	Russian-born Canadian actress
Dorothy Young	1907–2011	103	American entertainer and assistant to magician Harry Houdini
Izabella Yurieva	1899–2000	100	Russian singer
Miguel Zacarías	1905–2006	101	Mexican film director and producer
Manos Zacharias	1922–	104	Greek film director, writer, and actor
Vladimir Zamansky	1926–	100	Soviet-Russian actor
Vladimir Zeldin	1915–2016	101	Soviet-Russian actor
Hilda Žīgure	1918–2022	104	Latvian stage actress
Adolph Zukor	1873–1976	103	Austro-Hungarian-born American film producer; co-founder of Paramount Pictures
Jorge Zuloaga	1922–2022	100	Colombian television comedian

== See also ==
- List of semi-supercentenarians (actors, filmmakers and entertainers)
- List of supercentenarians (actors, filmmakers and entertainers)
