= List of supercentenarians (actors, filmmakers and entertainers) =

The following is a list of supercentenarians – specifically, people who became famous as actors, filmmakers and entertainers – known for reasons other than their longevity. For more lists, see lists of supercentenarians.

Living

Name	Lifespan	Age	Reason for Notability
Eileen Kramer	1914–2024	110	Australian dancer, artist, performer and choreographer
Frederica Sagor Maas	1900–2012	111	American screenwriter, playwright and essayist
Norman Spencer	1914–2024	110	British film producer, production manager and screenwriter
Ruthie Tompson	1910–2021	111	American animator

== See also ==
- List of centenarians (actors, filmmakers and entertainers)
- List of semi-supercentenarians (actors, filmmakers and entertainers)
