= La Busdonga =

Spanish singer

Obdulia Álvarez Díaz
- Born: 1896; Fuente la Plata, Oviedo, Asturias, Spain
- Died: 27 January 1960 (aged 63–64); Gijón
- Other names: La Busdonga
- Occupation: Singer

Obdulia Álvarez Díaz (known as La Busdonga; 1896, Oviedo, Asturias – 27 January 1960, Gijón) was a Spanish singer of Asturian folk music.

== Biography ==
Obdulia Álvarez Díaz was born in Oviedo in 1896. The nickname "La Busdonga" comes from the town of Busdongo de Arbas in León, where her father, a railway worker by profession, was stationed. She lived in Mieres besides Busdongo and, from 1934, resided in Gijón. In Mieres, her family ran a tavern (chigre). Her mother also sang, and she played the bagpipe and the drum, while her brother, Aurelio Álvarez El Busdongu, also accompanied her with the bagpipe.

She was considered one of the greatest voices of Asturian folk music. She was a contemporary of Ángel González, El Maragatu, Cuchichi, Botón, Claverol, Quin el Pescador, Santos Bandera, Miranda, El Polenchu de Gráu, and Xuacu'l de Sama.

In the 1920s, the composer and pianist Baldomero Fernández worked with her and Ángel González, El Maragatu, and the main tonadas within this genre emerged from this collaboration. Baldomero Fernández accompanied her on the piano and expanded her repertoire, which also included pasodobles, jotas, cuplés, and flamenco. She made her first recordings in 1925. Among her songs were: "Pasé'l puertu Payareus," "Canteros de Covadonga," "Carromateros," "Los mineros del Fondón," "Hay una línea trazada," among others.

In 1955, she participated as a guest artist in the Asturian song contest at the Babel salon, on this occasion, she was accompanied on the bagpipe by her brother Aurelio "El Busdongu", and in 1956 she recorded two songs with Laudelino Alonso for the Columbia record company.

Her recordings have been reissued several times, notably in 1987, when several of her records were recovered. La Busdonga became a reference for later generations, with singers like Diamantina Rodríguez, Josefina, Leonides, Maudilia, Margarita, Mariluz Cristóbal Caunedo, Anabel Santiago, or Marisa Valle Roso interpreting her songs.

== Recognition ==
The Ciudad de Oviedo Asturian song contest created the La Busdonga Award to recognize the best female voice.
