= The Watkins Family =

The Watkins Family are an American acoustic Southern gospel/bluegrass music performing group based in Toccoa, Georgia, United States.

The group comprises Judy Watkins, her two adult children Todd, Lorie, and various side musicians. The group has been performing for over twenty-five years. Their 2013 album Heaven's Worth Waiting For was produced by former Ricky Skaggs musician Grammy winner Mark Fain, Grammy nominee Karen Peck Gooch and Danny Jones.

The ministry started by Donald Watkins and his wife in the 1970s performs throughout the United States and Canada including in the U.S. Capitol building. The family was inducted to the Atlanta Country Music Hall of Fame in 2012.

== Awards and discography ==
According to Power Source magazine, their single "She's Working on Her Testimony" is a top ten bluegrass gospel song. According to Singing News magazine, "She's Working on Her Testimony" was a top 50 single. According to the Front Porch Fellowship Bluegrass Gospel Music Awards, Lorie is a three-time nominee for Favorite Female Vocalist and in 2010 was a nominee for Favorite Instrumentalist. Singing News magazine and other publications highlighted their appearances at the National Quartet Convention from 2006 to 2010. The Watkins Family shared a #1 song “God’s Children” with Randall Franks in the February 2023 Cashbox Magazine Bluegrass Gospel Charts. The song was written by Franks and late Georgia Music Hall of Fame member Cotton Carrier.
