= Jenny Alpha =

French actress and singer (1910-2010)

- Born: 22 April 1910; Fort-de-France, Martinique
- Died: 8 September 2010 (aged 100); Paris, France
- Other name: Jenny Alpha-Villard
- Occupations: Actress; singer
- Years active: 1929–2008
- Spouse: Noël Villard

Jenny Alpha (22 April 1910 – 8 September 2010) was a Martinique-born French actress and singer, who appeared in more than a hundred theatre productions and movies.

Born in Fort-de-France, Martinique in 1910, Alpha moved to Paris in 1929 to pursue a career in teaching but became sidetracked due to her passion for theatre. As well as appearing in theatre, she displayed a variety of talent and became a successful singer, appearing alongside the likes of Duke Ellington and Josephine Baker.

At the end of the thirties, she meets Jacques Dessart in Paris who will become her first husband. Since he was originally from the Nice area, they leave Paris during the war to stay with his family, who owned land. He will die prematurely and her in-laws will throw her out.

During the war, she played an active role in the French Resistance with her husband Noël Henri Villard, a prominent French poet (1904-1984).

During the war, while in Nice, she meets Francis Picabia who will paint her portrait in 1942 now in the collection of the Regional Museum of History and Ethnology of Martinique. In her memories, she explains that she met Henri Matisse who expressed a wish to paint her but later changed his mind since Picabia had already portrayed her.

In 1947, Jenny Alpha is chosen as a model by artist Lemagny (grand Prize of Rome) for a French postal stamp to represent the Martinique.

In 1956 she attends the first Conference of Black writers where she met Aimé Césaire, Léopold Sédar Senghor, Richard Wright, Langsthon Hugues.

After her career in Jazz club, she gets her breakthrough in theatre in 1984 in La folie ordinaire d’une fille de Cham by French writer Julius Amédée Laou.

Late in life, in 2005, she appeared in the film Monsieur Étienne, and in 2008 recorded a final album, La sérénade du muguet.

On 1 January 2009 she was granted the title of Chevalier de la Légion d'honneur by the French government, and in 2010 Alpha celebrated her 100th birthday. She died on 8 September 2010 in Paris, France.

In June 2013, a place was named in her honor in the 15th area of Paris, Place Jenny Alpha, not far from where she lived for three decades.

== See also ==
- List of centenarians (actors, filmmakers and entertainers)
- https://lesamisdejennyalpha.fr/
