= Any Day Now (1976 film) =

1976 film

- Directed by: Roeland Kerbosch
- Written by: Ton van Duinhoven; Roeland Kerbosch
- Produced by: Roeland Kerbosch
- Starring: Ansje van Brandenberg; Huib Broos
- Cinematography: Hein Groot
- Edited by: Bert Visser
- Distributed by: Gofilex
- Release date: February 19, 1976
- Running time: 93 minutes
- Country: Netherlands
- Language: Dutch

Any Day Now (a.k.a. Vandaag of morgen) is a 1976 science fiction film directed by Roeland Kerbosch and starring Ansje van Brandenberg.

== Plot ==
The film features a dystopian near-future world which has been split into three. The Third World are the owners of all of the world's resources and are now able to hold the United States and Europe to ransom.

== Cast ==
- Ansje van Brandenberg
- Huib Broos
- Ton van Duinhoven
- Wim de Haas
- Piet Hendriks
- Ben Hulsman
- Michiel Kerbosch
- Gees Linnebank
- Barbara Masbeck
- Georgette Reyevski
- Coby Stunnenberg
- Bernard Martens van Vliet
- Frans Vorstman
