= Randall Franks =

American actor, musician and author

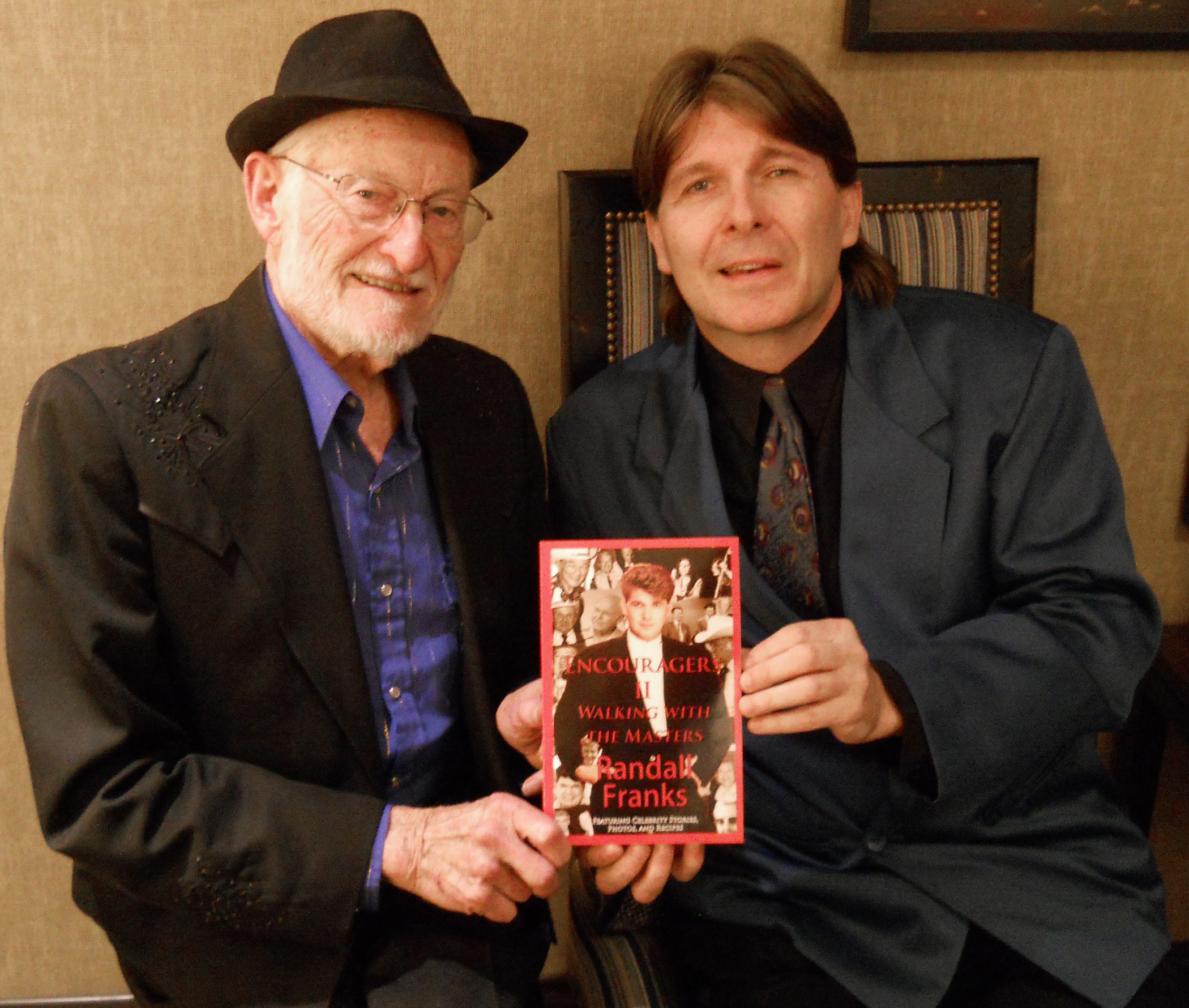
Actor/entertainer Randall Franks (right), "Officer Randy Goode" from TV's In the Heat of the Night, and his mentor the late Grand Ole Opry star Jesse McReynolds, who is featured in Franks's book "Encouragers II: Walking with the Masters" visit backstage at the Grand Ole Opry before performing at the Grand Ole Opry in 2015.

Randall Franks is an American entertainer recognized for his multifaceted career in the arts. He is known for his roles as a film and television actor, author, and as a bluegrass singer and musician. Franks is proficient in playing several instruments, including the fiddle, mandolin, guitar, and mountain dulcimer. His multiple musical achievements and awards include nominations for Inspirational Vocalist and Musician of the Year at the Josie Music Awards at the Grand Ole Opry House in 2023 and 2024, where he also won the Musician of the Year - Fiddle award in 2024. His contributions to music have been honored with inductions into numerous halls of fame: the Tri-State Gospel Music Hall of Fame (2022), America's Old Time Country Music Hall of Fame (2019), Independent Country Music Hall of Fame (2013), and the International Bluegrass Music Museum & Hall of Fame, which recognized him as a Bluegrass Legend in 2010. Additionally, he has received regional accolades such as an induction into the Atlanta Country Music Hall of Fame, the Carolinas Country, Bluegrass and Gospel Hall of Fame Legend Award, and was named the "Appalachian Ambassador of the Fiddle" by Catoosa County, Georgia in 2004. Franks was also inducted into the Chamber Business Person Hall of Fame in 2020 and was the inaugural recipient of the AirPlay Direct Evolution Grant.

== Ancestry ==
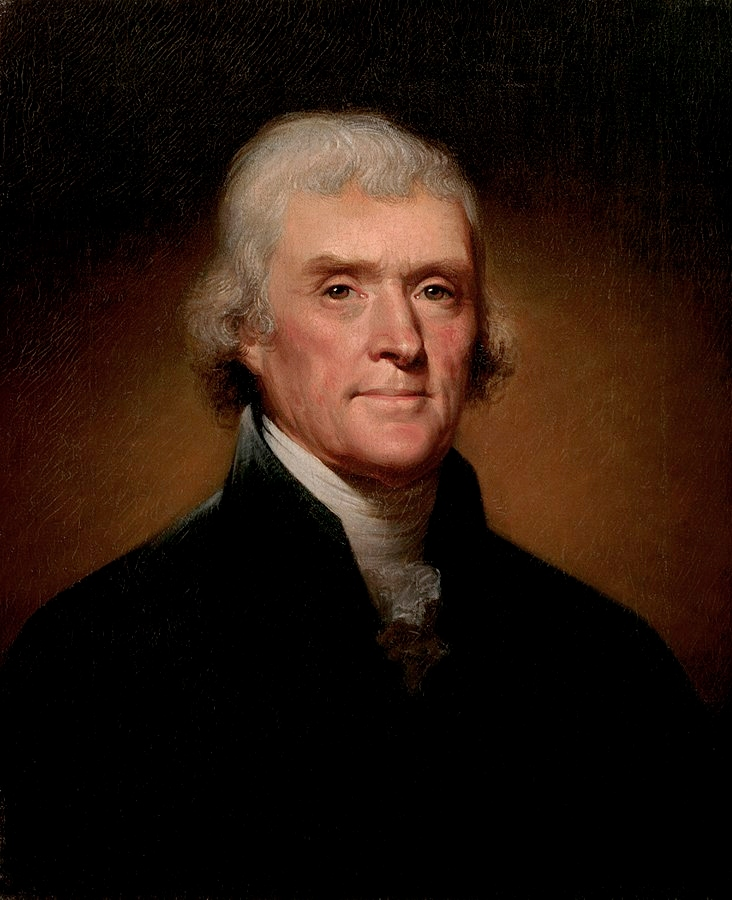
Official Presidential portrait of Thomas Jefferson (by Rembrandt Peale, 1800)(cropped)

The Appalachian has a notable lineage that connects him to several key figures in both American and European history. He is a cousin to American founding fathers George Washington and Thomas Jefferson, and shares kinship with other U.S. Presidents including John Adams, James Madison, and James Monroe. Remarkably, of the 56 signatories of the United States Declaration of Independence 48 were his family members. His ancestry also traces back to significant European royal houses: the English House of Tudor and House of Plantagenet, the French Capetian Dynasty, the Russian Rurik Dynasty, and the Scottish House of Bruce and House of Stuart. Among his grandfathers, he counts King Edward III and King Henry VIII of England, the latter being an uncle, King James IV and Robert the Bruce of Scotland, and King Philip IV of France. This extensive lineage underscores his deep historical and royal connections.

== TV and Movies ==
The American actor, filmmaker, and musician has a significant career spanning film, television, and music. Born into a family with deep roots in the entertainment industry, his relatives include notable figures such as Cecil B. DeMille, Buster Keaton, John Wayne, Lucille Ball, Jimmy Stewart, Andy Griffith, James Dean, Katharine Hepburn and Bing Crosby. Franks began his professional career as a youth, initially gaining recognition as a musician and singer on variety shows. His first film role was a singing part in the 1988 movie "Desperate for Love," followed by minor roles in "Blind Side" (1988) and "No Holds Barred" (1989). His breakthrough came with the role of Officer Randy Goode in the television series "In the Heat of the Night" (1988–1993), which received critical acclaim, including NAACP Image Awards for Outstanding Drama Series in 1992 and 1993, and Golden Globe nominations for Best Television Drama in 1990 and 1991. *Official website After taking a break from film and dramatic television from 2001 to 2009, he returned to acting in 2009, portraying attorney Alvin Potter in "Musical Theater of Hope" for Robert Townsend. Some of Franks's film roles include Dr. J.A. Anderson in "The Crickets Dance" (2020), winning eleven film festival awards including the Best Ensemble Cast and Best Feature Film which won multiple film festival awards, including Best Ensemble Cast and Best Feature Film; Marv Headly in "Broken" (2015); Edgar Albert in "The Solomon Bunch" (2013); Pastor John Keebley in "Lukewarm" (2012); and Principal Nate Foster in "Decision" (2011). He starred as Todd in the sci-fi thriller "Phoenix Falling" and as Captain Morgan Fairhope in "Firebase 9." On television, he appeared in productions like Hallmark Hall of Fame's "The Flamingo Rising" and Dolly Parton's "Blue Valley Songbird." Franks also contributed to the film "Lawless" (2012) as an Appalachian music consultant while appearing with his Cornhuskers String Band. In addition to his acting, Franks has worked behind the camera, contributing to shows like "Grace Under Fire" and "Foxworthy". He directed and hosted the PBS documentary "Still Ramblin'" about Ramblin' "Doc" Tommy Scott, and he directed and starred in "The Road to Nashville" (2015) with appearances by Mountain Cove Bluegrass, Ryan Stinson, Marcia Campbell, Jesse McReynolds and Mac Wiseman. His musical career has seen him appear on various shows, including "Country Kids TV Series," "Tonight at Ferlinghetti's," "Nashville Now," "Crook and Chase," "Miller & Company," and "HGTV's Extreme Homes." He maintains an active presence on his YouTube channel, "Randall Franks TV," sharing insights from his career. His recent works include directing and starring in the short film "The American's Creed" and its accompanying documentary, portraying Capt. Robert B. Shields. He is set to play Dr. Caring in the upcoming psychological thriller "The Ageless," based on a novel by Deborah Robillard.

== Author ==
Randall Franks is an author known for his work across multiple genres, including fiction, non-fiction, and devotional literature. His first novel, "A Badge or an Old Guitar: A Music City Murder Mystery," introduces readers to James Randall, a small-town police officer caught up in a murder mystery while pursuing his musical dreams. In 2024, Franks published "Seeing Faith: A Devotional," which includes 31 Bible studies based on the King James Version, drawing from his experiences in music, acting, and his Southern Appalachian heritage. This devotional features contributions from seven pastors: Carroll Allen, Jeff Brown, Chris Bryant, Jamie Ellis, Justin Gazaway, David Sampson, and Mike Smith. Franks co-authored "Testing the Metal of Life: The Joe Barger Story" in 2023, detailing the life of Joe Barger, who served as mayor and alderman in Ringgold, Georgia, and worked as a metallurgical engineer.

Franks has written a three-volume series titled "Encouragers":

- "Encouragers III: A Guiding Hand" (2016)
- "Encouragers II: Walking with the Masters" (2015)
- "Encouragers I: Finding the Light" (2014)

These volumes contain 156 stories about individuals who have influenced Franks' life, including actors and entertainers, with accompanying photographs and celebrity recipes.

Other notable works by Franks include:

- "Whittlin' and Fiddlin' My Own Way: The Violet Hensley Story" (2014), an autobiography of Violet Hensley, a well-known personality at Silver Dollar City personality.
- "A Mountain Pearl: Appalachian Reminiscing and Recipes," inspired by stories from his mother, Pearl Franks.
- "Stirring Up Additional Success with a Southern Flavor" and "Stirring Up Success with a Southern Flavor," both co-authored with Shirley Smith focusing on culinary success with a Southern twist. and "Stirring Up Success with a Southern Flavor",
- "Snake Oil, Superstars, and Me" (2007), co-authored with Ramblin' "Doc" Tommy Scott and Shirley Noe Swiesz, which recounts Scott's extensive career in entertainment.

As of 2024, Franks is in the process of writing Frankly Speaking: Thoughts on This and That, which promises to offer insights into various topics from his perspective.

== Journalist ==
He is an American journalist who began writing in high school, with early publications in "Bluegrass Unlimited," "SEBA Breakdown," and "Precious Memories" magazine.

Career Highlights:

- Journalism (2001–2009): Associated with News Publishing Co., where he won 21 awards from the Georgia and National Press Associations, including a First Place for Feature Photo.
- Columnist: Writes "Southern Style," a column reflecting Southern life, humor and inspiration, similar to his cousin Mark Twain. It's syndicated across publications from North Carolina to Louisiana which continues to present day, maintaining his reputation in Southern journalism.

== Music Artist ==
=== Early years ===
Randall Franks's musical journey was shaped by Southern Gospel piano and Appalachian fiddle, introduced to him at family gatherings. His passion for the violin was ignited by listening to Ervin Rouse's "Orange Blossom Special" during a school lesson from Dr. Donald Grisier. He honed his skills under the guidance of notable fiddlers like Dallas Burrell, WSB (AM) Barndance Host Cotton Carrier, Gordon Tanner of The Skillet Lickers, and Anita Sorrells Mathis.

The Peachtree Pickers:

Franks founded The Peachtree Pickers, a band that gained fame, including a regular television spot on "The Country Kids TV Series" and performances for the Grand Ole Opry. The group released five albums through Perfection Sound and Attieram Records. To expand their reach, Franks established a fan club managed by Pearl Bruce, which by 1986 had around 8,000 members. He published "The Pickin' Post" to engage fans with news about his career, bluegrass festivals, and other bands, while "The Singing Post" catered specifically to gospel music enthusiasts.

Solo and Acting Career:

After The Peachtree Pickers disbanded due to members pursuing higher education, Franks embarked on a solo musical career while also exploring acting. He made his debut guest appearance at the Grand Ole Opry in 1983 and continued to make appearances there until 2015, balancing music with acting roles and guest performances.

=== Randall Franks and the Hollywood Hillbilly Jamboree ===
Randall Franks established his Hollywood Hillbilly Jamboree following the release of his 1990 solo album "Handshakes and Smiles." The Jamboree is a historic musical show that blends Appalachian bluegrass, gospel, and traditional country music.

- History and Concept:

The Jamboree was created by Ramblin' "Doc" Tommy Scott in 1945, which historically featured stars like Uncle Dave Macon, Stringbean Akeman, Carolina Cotton, Johnny Mack Brown, Ray Whitley, Sunset Carson, Fuzzy St. John, to Tim McCoy and others.

- Performances:

The show featured guest appearances from celebrities such as Donna Douglas ("The Beverly Hillbillies"), Sonny Shroyer ("The Dukes of Hazzard") and Dan Biggers ("In the Heat of the Night"). It has expanded to include performances at fairs and major country music events, reaching its largest audience of over 30,000 in South Carolina in 1999.

- Musical Acts:

Over the years, the Jamboree has showcased diverse acts including The Sand Mountain Boys, Ryan Robertson, Barney Miller, Roger Hammett, James Watson, Bill Everett, Gilbert Hancock, Sue and Kim Koskela, Danny Bell, David Davis and the Warrior River Boys, Gary Waldrep, The Dowden Sisters, Ryan Stinson, the Watkins Family, Wesley Crider, Jaden Maxwell, Smith & Wesley, The Marksmen Quartet, Testimony Quartet, Getting Off Track, Colton Brown, Caleb Lewis, Dawson Wright and others.

=== Randall Franks' Musical Career ===
- Fiddle Music:

During the late 1980s and early 1990s, Franks, alongside Alison Krauss, was a notable figure in the fiddle music genre.

- Albums and Collaborations:

Franks released music throughout the 1990s, including collaborations with The Whites and albums like "Sacred Sounds of Appalachia" (1992) and "Tunes and Tales from Tunnel Hill" (1995), both of which reached the Top 30 in bluegrass charts. During the late 1980s and early 1990s, Franks, along with became prominent figures in the fiddle music scene. Franks continued to release music throughout the 1990s, including a collaboration with Grand Ole Opry stars titled "Let's Live Every Day Like It Was Christmas." He also released two bluegrass albums that reached the Top 30: "Sacred Sounds of Appalachia" (1992) and "Tunes and Tales from Tunnel Hill" (1995).

- Awards and Events:

His influence in bluegrass led to hosting roles at the 1995 SPBGMA Bluegrass Music Awards and presenting at the IBMA Awards. Franks has performed at significant events including the Country Music Association Fan Fair, National Folk Festival (United States), National Black Arts Festival, the Grand Ole Opry among others.

=== Fiddling ===
Style and Influence:

Randall Franks's fiddling style is deeply rooted in the traditions of Georgia Fiddle Bands, notably influenced by Fiddlin' John Carson, and The Skillet Lickers. His technique was refined through participation in Georgia fiddle contests, organized by mandolinist Bill Lowery, and prestigious events like the Grand Ole Opry's Grand Master Fiddler Championship, where he became a regular performer. His bluegrass album Tunes and Tales from Tunnel Hill includes a track called "Big Tige, Mr. Roy and Me," which recounts an experience with Opry fiddling stars Benny Martin and Roy Acuff following a Grand Master Fiddler Championship.

- Fiddle Albums: Franks has released four notable fiddle recordings: "Peach Picked Fiddle Favorites," "Pick of the Peaches Fiddlin'," "Golden River Fiddlin'," and "Sacred Sounds of Appalachia."
- Collaborations: His career includes performances or recordings with an extensive list of luminaries in country, gospel, and bluegrass music, such as Carl Perkins; Charlie Daniels; Peabo Bryson; The Whites; Ricky Skaggs; Kitty Wells; Pee Wee King; Jimmy Dickens; Jeff and Sheri Easter; The Lewis Family; The Isaacs; the Primitive Quartet; Bill Monroe; Jim and Jesse; Ralph Stanley; Raymond Fairchild; Jimmy Martin; Mac Wiseman; Chubby Wise; Josh Graves; Doug Dillard; Jerry Douglas; Sam Bush; Byron Berline; John Schneider (screen actor), Smith and Wesley, the Warrior River Boys; the Sand Mountain Boys; the Gary Waldrep Band; the Cox Family; the Watkins Family; the Sidemen; Elaine and Shorty; and "Doc" Tommy Scott's Last Real Old Time Medicine Show showcasing his versatility and integration into the music community.

Recognition and Legacy

- Randall Franks Trophy:

In honor of his contribution to preserving Georgia's fiddling heritage, a fiddle contest was named after him in the 1990s at Lake Lanier Islands. The Randall Franks Trophy was also awarded there and then at the 1890s Day Jamboree Old Time Fiddler's Convention in Ringgold, Georgia, with notable winners from 1994 to 2018 {Jack Weeks, Roy Crawford, Johnny Ray Watts (Three-Times), Aerin DeJarnette, Mark Ralph, Doug Fleener, Megan Lynch, Maddie Denton (Five-Times), and Tyler Andal.}.

- Event Hosting:

Franks has hosted numerous contests, shows and co-hosts America's Grand Master Fiddler Championship in Nashville, further cementing his status in the fiddler community.

=== Randall Franks and the Georgia Mafia Bluegrass Band ===
Georgia Music Hall of Fame member Johnny Carson formed The Georgia Mafia Bluegrass Band in 2009 to support Randall Franks in a PBS television special performance. The band's lineup included Randall Franks (fiddle), Jerry Burke (fiddle), Helen Burke (guitar), J. Max McKee (banjo), Rick Smith (guitar), and Dean Marsh (bass). The group has performed at various events, including a live Georgia Public Broadcasting presentation of the Georgia Music Hall of Fame, where they appeared alongside Collective Soul and Third Day. The Georgia Mafia Bluegrass Band has received recognition within the Georgia music scene winning Bluegrass Band of the Year seven times. They continued to perform at special events and award shows in Georgia, the Carolinas, and Tennessee, with occasional changes in the lineup through 2020. One of their performances, "The Old Black Fiddle," is featured on the compilation album "Randall Franks: 30 Years on TV and Radio - Vol. II."

=== Randall Franks and the Cornhuskers String Band ===
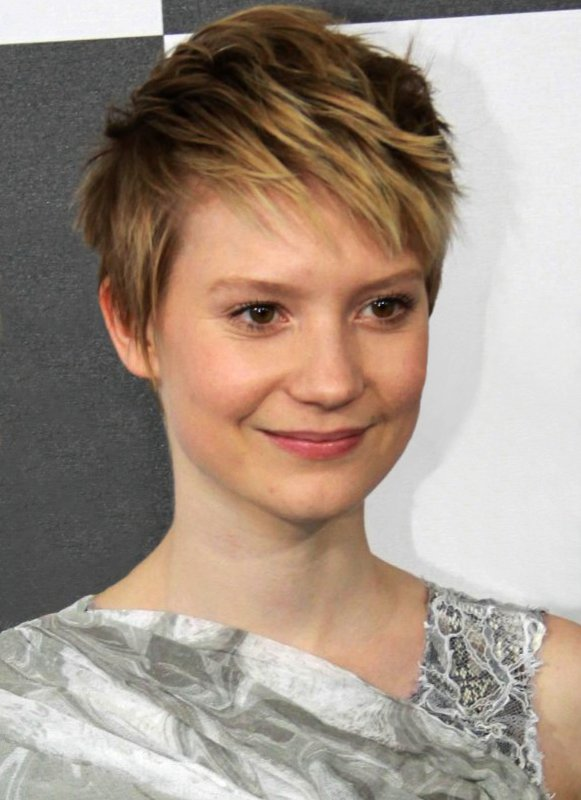
Mia Wasikowska 2010

Formation and Performance:

- Established: 2011 by Randall Franks for the film "Lawless (film)" (originally titled "The Wettest County in the World").
- Members: Randall Franks: Fiddle; Jerry Burke: Mandolin; Barney Miller: Resonator guitar; Hollis Landrum: Banjo; Rusty Tate: Banjo

Role in "Lawless":

- Function: The group served as live performers for cast members Tom Hardy, Shia LaBeouf, Jason Clarke, and Dane DeHaan, contributing to the film's atmosphere by providing an authentic musical backdrop for a community dance scene.
- Special Appearance: Actress Mia Wasikowska also joined this ensemble on camera, playing mandolin and singing, enhancing the film's portrayal of the early 20th-century Virginia setting.

Music Contribution:

- Notable Performance: Their rendition of "Little Liza Jane" was featured on the compilation album "Randall Franks: 30 Years on TV and Radio - Vol. II."
- The collaboration between Franks, as an Appalachian music consultant, and director John Hillcoat, aimed to bring a genuine experience to the film, enriching its narrative with the sounds of the era.

=== Other Musical Acts ===
==== Bill Monroe and the Blue Grass Boys ====
Bill Monroe, an influential figure in country and bluegrass music, played a pivotal role in the early career of Randall Franks. Known for his inductions into multiple music Halls of Fame, Monroe not only mentored Franks but also facilitated his debut at the Grand Ole Opry by arranging for Franks's youth band, The Peachtree Pickers, to perform there. In 1984, following the departure of fiddler Kenny Baker from the Blue Grass Boys, Monroe invited Franks to join the ensemble. Despite being a student, Franks toured with Monroe alongside band members Wayne Lewis, Blake Williams, and Tater Tate before resuming his education. During this stint, live recordings were captured, two of which, "Back Up and Push," "The Road to Columbus" and "Cotton-Eyed Joe" were later featured on the album "The American's Creed," released in 2016 and 2024, respectively. Sales from these tracks support the Share America Foundation's Pearl and Floyd Franks Appalachian Music Scholarship. Franks's tenure with Monroe has been recognized by various institutions and publications, including the International Bluegrass Music Hall of Fame and Museum, the State of Kentucky, Bluegrass Unlimited, and the Grand Ole Opry. Monroe continued to invite Franks to perform on his shows throughout his career, and since 2007, Franks has been actively involved in Blue Grass Boys reunions, maintaining the legacy of this legendary collaboration. Franks marked his 40th Anniversary as a Blue Grass Boy with a special appearance in Monroe's hometown of Rosine, Ky on Nov. 22, 2024. He then released two documentaries reflecting his time with Monroe: "Bill Monroe's Rosine with Blue Grass Boy Randall Franks" and "Bluegrass Legends :Kenny Baker & Randall Franks."

==== Doodle and the Golden River Grass ====
Doodle and the Golden River Grass was an Appalachian folk music group active from 1963 to 1995. The band included members John "Doodle" Thrower, James Watson, Gene Daniell, Wesley Clackum, and C.J. Clackum, among others. In 1985, Randall Franks joined the ensemble as their fiddler, enhancing the group's connection to the Georgia Fiddle Band tradition. Known for their appearances on PBS, at significant events like America's National Folk Festival, and the World's Fair, the band also performed at various other festivals and concerts. Over the course of their career, Doodle and the Golden River Grass released 17 albums, one of which, "Art of Field Recording Vol. 1," featured their performances and subsequently won a Grammy Award.

==== The Marksmen Quartet ====
The Marksmen Quartet was a gospel music group based in Murrayville, Georgia, known for their vocal performances. In 1984, Randall Franks joined the quartet, which was led by the late Dr. Earle Wheeler. The group had garnered several industry awards for their work. During Franks's involvement, which lasted intermittently until the early 1990s, the quartet also included members Mark Wheeler, Keith Chambers, Darrin Chambers, and Rob Gillentine. The Marksmen Quartet received nominations for Dove Awards and recorded multiple albums, with Franks contributing to songs that performed well on charts. Although Franks's active participation ended in the early 1990s, his connection with the group persisted; members of the quartet have continued to collaborate with him in various projects, including his 2012 DVD "Concert of Celebration."

==== Jeff & Sheri Easter ====
Randall Franks was the inaugural fiddler for the gospel music duo Jeff & Sheri Easter, contributing to their career launch with their debut album, "New Tradition." Franks performed with them both live and on television during this initial phase. Jeff & Sheri Easter later joined ed live and on television with the group during this period. Jeff & Sheri Easter later became part of Bill Gaither (gospel singer)'s Homecoming Friends, subsequently receiving Grammy nominations. They acknowledged Franks's early support by contributing to his 1990 album "Handshakes and Smiles," appearing on both the album and its singles. Their collaboration extended to Franks's 2012 DVD release, "Concert of Celebration."

==== David Davis and the Warrior River Boys ====
Randall Franks occasionally collaborated with the late mandolinist David Davis (bluegrass) and his bluegrass band, the Warrior River Boys, serving as a sideman where he played fiddle, guitar, and bass. He also made guest appearances at their concerts. During the 1990s, Davis and his band participated in performances with Randall Franks and the Hollywood Hillbilly Jamboree. In 2000, Franks and Davis released an Appalachian brother duet album titled "God's Children," which featured contributions from Warrior River Boy Marty Hays and guest appearances by Sonny Shroyer, "Doc" Tommy Scott, and Cotton and Jane Carrier. This album was first performed at the Signal Mountain Opry in Walden, Tennessee. Both musicians contributed to the 2009 compilation album "Heaven Knows Where We Will Go from Here," which included various bluegrass artists. David Davis also appeared in Franks's 2012 DVD "Concert of Celebration."

==== Jim and Jesse and the Virginia Boys ====
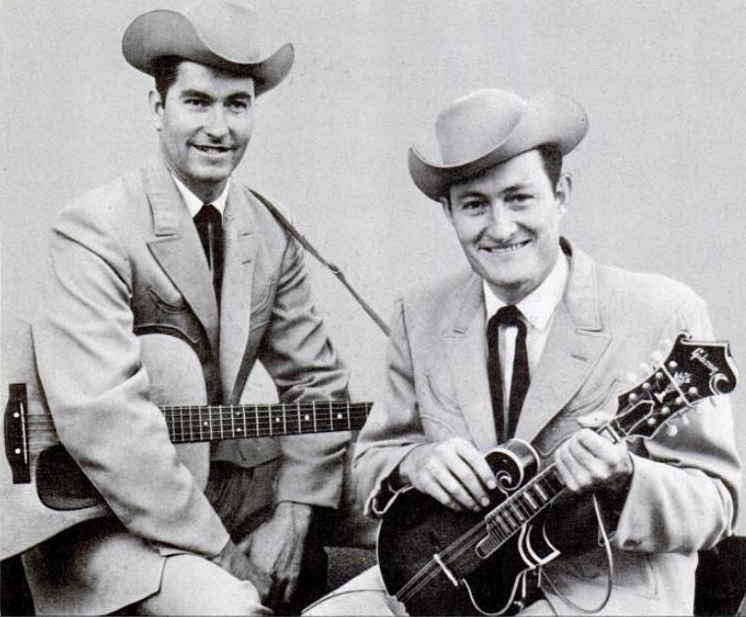
Jim & Jesse

Randall Franks had a significant association with the Grand Ole Opry stars Jim & Jesse, beginning with his membership in their fan club during his youth. The duo played a mentorship role in Franks's early career in country music. Jesse McReynolds contributed to Franks's debut solo album, "Handshakes and Smiles," which marked Franks's first charting album. Jesse McReynolds also featured in several other projects, including Franks's 2012 DVD "Concert of Celebration." Franks performed as a fiddler with Jim & Jesse and their backing band, the Virginia Boys, and continued to collaborate with Jesse after Jim's death. During the 1990s, Franks made regular guest appearances on "The Jim & Jesse Show." They backed Franks for special appearances on the Grand Ole Opry and various television shows, as well as for his "Share with DARE" Concerts at the Grand Ole Opry. Jim & Jesse worked with Franks on the "In the Heat of the Night" Christmas album, "Christmas Time's A Comin'," and together they recorded the ballad "Mean Joe Blake," co-written by Franks and actor Alan Autry.

==== The Lewis Family ====
The Lewis Family, members of both the Gospel and Bluegrass Music Halls of Fame, had a notable influence on Randall Franks from his early years. Their first collaboration happened in the 1980s when Little Roy Lewis performed with Franks's Peachtree Pickers in Cedartown, Georgia. From approximately 1990, Franks began making guest appearances with The Lewis Family at various concerts and festivals, continuing this practice throughout the 1990s. His last performance with them was at the Conasauga Bluegrass Festival in Dalton, Georgia, in 2008, where he played throughout their show. Franks also played a role in promoting their farewell concert in Lincolnton, Georgia, in 2009. Members of The Lewis Family contributed to several of Franks's projects; Travis Lewis and Lewis Phillips were featured on Franks's albums "Handshakes and Smiles" and "Sacred Sounds of Appalachia." Roy "Pop" Lewis Sr., an inductee of the Southern Gospel Music Hall of Fame, appeared in the music video for "Handshakes and Smiles." Additionally, The Lewis Family collaborated with Franks on the "In the Heat of the Night" Christmas album, "Christmas Time's A Comin'."

==== Chubby Wise ====
Between 1989 and 1996, Randall Franks frequently collaborated with Chubby Wise, an International Bluegrass Music Hall of Fame member, at bluegrass festivals in Georgia, Florida, and South Carolina. Their performances often highlighted twin fiddle duets. Chubby Wise contributed to the "In the Heat of the Night" Christmas album, "Christmas Time's A Comin'," where Franks was also featured. Their joint recording of "Golden Slippers" was included on Franks's compilation album "30 Years on Radio and TV Volume II."

==== "Doc" Tommy Scott and the Last Real Old Time Medicine Show ====
Randall Franks began his collaboration with Ramblin' "Doc" Tommy Scott and his Last Real Old Time Medicine Show in 1995, initially working behind the scenes as a songwriter, publishing administrator, and film catalog manager. Franks also managed the show's booking for the 1996 Olympics from Studio City, California. Together, they co-wrote songs like "You Can't Stop Time," which was later recorded by the Lewis Family. Their professional partnership resulted in several projects, including the 1999 album "Comedy Down Home" and Scott's track "Say A Little Prayer" on the 2000 album "God's Children." Franks produced and hosted the PBS documentaries "Still Ramblin'" and "Trail of the Hawk" in 2001, both centered on Scott's career. He also performed with the Medicine Show, including an appearance on HGTV's "Extreme Homes." In April 2009, Franks and Scott staged the play "An Appalachian Gathering" to raise funds for the Share America Foundation, Inc., which portrayed Southern life in the 1940s and contemporary times, with Franks playing Scott in the historical scenes. Scott also featured in Franks's 2012 DVD "Concert of Celebration." After Scott's passing on September 30, 2013, Franks and the Watkins Family performed "Say A Little Prayer" at Scott's private memorial service.

==== The Watkins Family ====
After taking a hiatus to care for his ailing mother, Randall Franks resumed touring in 2007. For his return to both stage and television performances, he enlisted the Watkins Family as his backing band. In return, Franks made special guest appearances at the Watkins Family's concerts, including notable events like the National Quartet Convention and appearances on the Inspiration Network (INSP). Their collaboration extended to package shows and mutual support in stage performances. The Watkins Family also joined Franks in his Hollywood Hillbilly Jamboree. This partnership was captured on Franks's compilation album "30 Years on Radio and TV Volume I," where they jointly performed the tracks "Must Be a Reason" and "God's Children."

==== Alan Autry ====
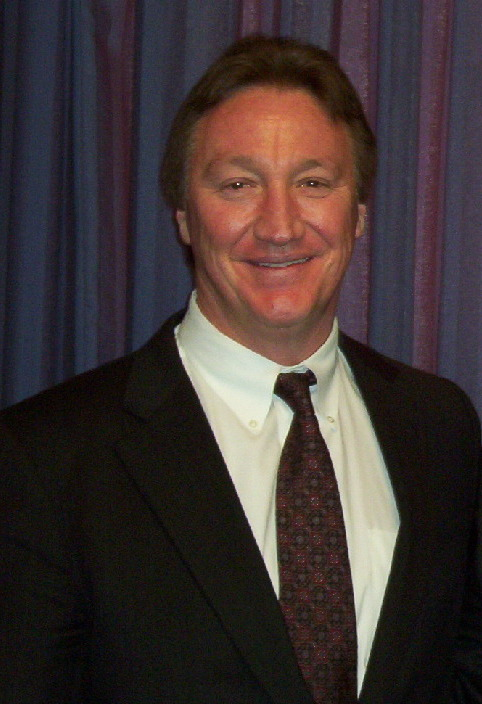
Alan Autry

Randall Franks and Alan Autry collaborated under Autry-Franks Productions and Crimson Records to release the Americana album "Alan Autry and Randall Franks Mississippi Moon: Country Traditions" in 2013. This album features both artists performing a mix of classic and original songs spanning country, bluegrass, and Southern gospel music styles. It includes guest appearances by Bluegrass Hall of Fame members Jim and Jesse McReynolds, and three-time Dove Award nominee Mark Wheeler. Franks and Autry had earlier worked together as producers for the "In the Heat of the Night Christmas Time's A Comin'" CD. In 1991, the pair, along with actor David Hart, made an appearance on the Grand Ole Opry and performed twice on TNN (The Nashville Network).

==== Elaine and Shorty - The GrassKats ====
During his college years, Randall Franks played fiddle with the Georgia-based bluegrass band Elaine and Shorty - The GrassKats. The band's lineup at the time included Shorty Eager on banjo, Elaine Eager on guitar, and initially Mike Newberry on bass, who was later replaced by Bruce Sims. Shorty Eager had previously been part of Jimmy Martin's Sunny Mountain Boys. The GrassKats were active performers, appearing regularly at festivals, concerts, clubs, and on television. In recognition of their contributions to the local music scene, Elaine and Shorty Eager were inducted into the Atlanta Country Music Hall of Honor in 2007.

==== Josh Graves ====
Randall Franks collaborated with Josh Graves, an International Bluegrass Music Hall of Fame member renowned for his work on the resonator guitar. Graves had previously been associated with Flatt & Scruggs, The Masters of Bluegrass, and Kenny Baker. Franks described his work with Graves as his first professional music job. They later collaborated on the "In the Heat of the Night" Christmas album, where Graves contributed to the title track "Christmas Time's A Comin'."

== Discography ==
This discography presents Randall Franks's recordings in chronological order, including album titles, record labels, and release formats. It also notes significant musicians who contributed to the recordings where applicable.

- "Ivory Halls"
  - Artist: The Peachtree Pickers
  - Label: Attieram Records
  - Catalog Number: AP I 1618
  - Format: Album, Cassette
- "Peach Picked Fiddle Favorites"
  - Artist: Randall Franks and the Peachtree Pickers
  - Label:
    - Perfection Sound (1985) - Cassette
    - Attieram Records (1987) - Cassette
    - Crimson Records (2008) - CD (Catalog Number: 1646)
- "Bluegrass Banjo"
  - Artist: The Peachtree Pickers
  - Label: Perfection Sound
  - Catalog Number: Unspecified
  - Format: Cassette
- "Building on Sand"
  - Artist: The Peachtree Pickers
  - Label: Attieram Records
  - Catalog Number: API 1626
  - Format: Album, Cassette
- "Pick of the Peaches Fiddlin'"
  - Artist: Randall Franks and the Peachtree Pickers
  - Label:
  - Attieram Records (1986) – Cassette
  - Crimson Records (2008) - CD (Catalog Number: 1656)
- "Golden River Fiddlin'"
  - Artist: Randall "Randy" Franks with the Golden River Grass
  - Label: Crimson Records
  - Catalog Number: RG 2760
  - Format:
    - Cassette (1989)
    - CD (2008)

Notes: Described by Bluegrass Unlimited as "hard driving...straightahead...solid...sure" in the style of Tommy Jackson and Paul Warren. Franks was also acknowledged by the Society for the Preservation of Bluegrass Music in America (SPBGMA) for his "special touch on the fiddle".

- "Handshakes and Smiles"
  - Artist: Randall "Randy" Franks
  - Label: Crimson Records
  - Catalog Number: 2679
  - Format:
    - Cassette (1990)
    - CD (2000)

Notable Musicians: Included Travis Lewis, Mark Wheeler, Lewis Phillips, Jeff & Sheri Easter, Jesse McReynolds, Darrin Chambers, Steve Easter, Carol Lee Cooper, Dennis McCall, and Eugene Akers.

Notes: This album marked Franks's crossover into the Southern Gospel market, reaching the Top 20 Sales Charts. It received a four-star review from Singing News. The music video for "Handshakes and Smiles" was nominated for a Telly Award, featuring Alan Autry, David Hart, Pop Lewis, Jesse McReynolds, Travis Lewis, Mark Wheeler, and Lewis Phillips.

- Singles:
    - He's Never Gonna Fool Me Again / Rock of Ages - Randall "Randy" Franks Crimson Records CR-2679-01 (7" vinyl, 45 RPM) Pressed By – United Record Pressing – U-26693M
    - You Better Get Ready / Pass Me Not - Randall "Randy" Franks Crimson Records CR-2679-01C, CR-2679-01D (7" vinyl, 45 RPM) Pressed By – United Record Pressing – U-28747

Albums Continued:

- "Sacred Sounds of Appalachia"
  - Artist: Randall Franks
  - Label:
    - Initially released by Sonlite Records for Zion (1992)
    - Re-released by Crimson Records (1998) - Catalog Number: CRZ111
  - Format: Cassette, CD

Musicians: Randall Franks with The Peachtree Pickers including Mark Wheeler, Lewis Phillips, Steve "Rabbit" Easter, Travis Lewis, Bill Everett, Eugene Akers, Earle Wheeler

  - Tracks:
    - Uncloudy Day
    - Beautiful Star of Bethlehem
    - Leaning on the Everlasting Arms
    - Sweet Hour of Prayer
    - Will the Circle Be Unbroken
    - Old Time Religion
    - Amazing Grace
    - Kneel at the Cross
    - Just A Rose Will Do
    - This World Is Not My Home

Notes: This album features traditional hymns and gospel standards, reflecting the musical heritage of Appalachia.

- Singles:
  - From Sonlite Singles CD Vol. 8 (1992, Sonlite/Charity Records):
    - "Leaning on the Everlasting Arms" by Randall "Randy" Franks from Sacred Sounds of Appalachia
    - "Sweet Hour of Prayer" by Randall "Randy" Franks from Sacred Sounds of Appalachia
    - "This World Is Not My Home" by Randall "Randy" Franks from Sacred Sounds of Appalachia
  - From Sonlite Singles CD Vol. 10 (1992, Sonlite/Charity Records):
    - "Beautiful Star of Bethlehem" by Randall "Randy" Franks from Sacred Sounds of Appalachia
    - "Bring A Torch Jeanette Isabella" by Carroll O'Connor with Randall Franks, Jesse McReynolds, Abe Manuel Jr. and Buddy Spicher from Christmas Times' A Comin' In the Heat of the Night Cast and Friends
- "Christmas Time's A Comin'" by In the Heat of the Night Cast with Doug Dillard, Josh Graves, Jim and Jesse McReynolds, The Lewis Family, Wayne Lewis, Jimmy Martin, Ralph Stanley, Buddy Spicher, Chubby Wise and Mac Wiseman from Christmas Times' A Comin' In the Heat of the Night Cast and Friends

Albums Continued:

- "Tunes and Tales from Tunnel Hill"
  - Artist: Randall Franks and the Sand Mountain Boys
  - Label: Crimson Records
  - Format:
    - Cassette (1995) - Catalog Number: 1634
    - CD (2007)

Musicians: Randall Franks with Gary Waldrep, Kenny Townsel, Wayne Crain, and Jerry Crain

- "Mississippi Moon"
  - Artist: Randall Franks
  - Label: Crimson Records
  - Format: Cassette EP (4 songs, 1996)
- Singles:
  - From Sonlite Singles CD Vol. 22 (1996, Sonlite Records):
    - "Let's Live Every Day Like It Was Christmas" with The Whites from "Christmas Times' A Comin' In the Heat of the Night Cast and Friends"

Albums (Continued):

- "Comedy Down Home"
  - Artist: Randall Franks with "Doc" Tommy Scott
  - Release Year: 1997

Other Performers: Gary Waldrep, Kenneth Townsel, and James Watson

- Singles:
  - From Galaxy Entertainment CD Radio Compilations:
    - Hometown Christmas Favorites (1997):
      - "The Pilgrimage to Bethlehem" - Randall Franks (from Golden River Fiddlin')
    - Hometown Gospel Favorites Vol. 1 (1998):
      - "Rock of Ages" - Randall Franks (from Golden River Fiddlin')
    - Hometown Gospel Favorites Vol. 2 (1999):
      - "Precious Memories" - Randall Franks (from Golden River Fiddlin')

Albums Continued:

- "God's Children"
  - Artist: Randall Franks and David Davis
  - Special Guests: Marty Hays, Sonny Shroyer, Ramblin' "Doc" Tommy Scott, Cotton and Jane Carrier
- Singles:
  - From LAMP Music Group CD (2001, Radio Promotion):
    - "Children in Need" - Randall Franks and David Davis with Sonny Shroyer performing the Franks and Ramblin' "Doc" Tommy Scott recitation from God's Children.

Albums Continued:

- "An Appalachian Musical Revival: Live at the Ringgold Depot"
  - Artist: Randall Franks and Various Artists
  - Label: Share America/Crimson
  - Format: CD (2008)

Features: Randall Franks with multiple artists including Four Fold, Buddy Liles, the Marksmen Quartet, Barney Miller, the Smoky Mountain Boys, the Southern Sound Quartet, the Testimony Quartet, Voices Won, Walnut Grove Bluegrass Band, the Watkins Family, Garrett Arb, Brady Hughes, John Rice, Deborah Taylor, Calvary Strings, Mt. Peria Baptist Church Male Chorus, and the Ringgold United Methodist Church Chancel Choir.

- "Early Gospel Favorites"
  - Artist: Randall Franks and the Peachtree Pickers
  - Label: Crimson Records
  - Catalog Number: CR 1527
  - Release Year: 2010
- "Down at Raccoon Creek"
  - Label: Crimson Records
  - Catalog Number: CR 1926
  - Release Year: 2010
- "Early Bluegrass Recordings"
  - Artist: Randall Franks and the Peachtree Pickers
  - Label: Crimson Records
  - Catalog Number: CR 2892
  - Release Year: 2012

Albums Continued:

- "A Concert of Celebration: A Mountain Pearl"
  - Artist: Randall Franks and Various Artists
  - Format: DVD (2012)

Features: Performances by Randall Franks alongside artists like Paul Brown, John and Debbie Farley, Ramblin' "Doc" Tommy Scott, Curly Seckler, Peanut Faircloth with the Trust Jesus Singers, Chubby Wise, David Davis, Johnny Counterfit, Gary Waldrep, Barney Miller, Jeff & Sheri Easter, Bill Monroe and the Blue Grass Boys, Butch Lanham, Doodle and the Golden River Grass, Dale Tilley, Jesse McReynolds, Johnnie Sue, and Nelson Richardson.

- "Mississippi Moon: Country Traditions"
  - Artist: Randall Franks and Alan Autry
  - Label: Crimson Records
  - Format: Americana CD (2013)

Details: Features both artists vocally, with Randall Franks contributing musically and serving as the producer. .

- "Mountain Opry Memories"
  - Artist: Randall Franks
  - Label: Share America Foundation
  - Catalog Number: SAF102
  - Release Year: 2013

Details: Includes 17 recordings from appearances at the Mountain Opry in Walden, Tennessee, spanning from 1999 to 2010. Produced by Randall Franks, Tom Adkins, and Tom Morgan, with special appearances by David Davis, the late country pioneer Charlie "Peanut" Faircloth, the Mountain Cove Bluegrass Band, Valley Grass, and others.

- "Precious Memories"
  - Artist: Randall Franks and Various Artists
  - Label: Share America Foundation
  - Release Year: 2014

Details: Live recording at the Ringgold Depot, featuring Randall Franks with Calvary's Blend, Cody Harvey, Butch Lanham, Tim Owens and Journey On, Ryan Stinson, and Johnnie Sue.

- "Country Kids"
  - Artist: Randall Franks and the Peachtree Pickers
  - Label: Crimson Records
  - Catalog Number: CR-2899
  - Release Year: 2014

Details: A collection of previously unreleased recordings from 1975 to 1983, showcasing the early work of Randall Franks and the Peachtree Pickers.

- "Keep 'Em Smilin'"
  - Artist: Randall Franks
  - Label: Crimson Records
  - Release Year: 2016

Details: A Christian music and comedy CD where Franks is accompanied by pianist Curtis Broadway. The album features some of his most requested songs and was premiered during an appearance with former U.S. President Jimmy Carter. The album includes some of his most frequently requested songs, accompanied by Southern gospel pianist Curtis Broadway.

- "30 Years on Radio and TV Volume I"
  - Artist: Randall Franks
  - Label: Share America Foundation
  - Release Year: 2016

Details: Includes 23 Christian and comedy recordings with guest artists like Raymond Fairchild, Voices Won, The Whites, Jeff & Sheri Easter, David Davis and the Warrior River Boys, Doodle and the Golden River Grass, Jerry Douglas, Steve Easter, Travis Lewis, Lewis Phillips, "Doc" Tommy Scott, Gary Waldrep, Mark Wheeler, Carol Lee Singers, and Darrin Chambers. Also features his 2023 #1 Cashbox recording "God's Children" with The Watkins Family.

- "30 Years on Radio and TV Volume II"
  - Artist: Randall Franks
  - Label: Share America Foundation
  - Release Year: 2016

Details: Contains 23 recordings of bluegrass, folk, Americana, and comedy, with collaborations including Bill Monroe and the Blue Grass Boys, Jim and Jesse McReynolds, Chubby Wise, Raymond Fairchild, Gary Waldrep, his Cornhuskers String Band and the Georgia Mafia Bluegrass Band.

- "Americana Youth of Southern Appalachia"
  - Artist: Randall Franks with Various Artists
  - Label: Share America Foundation
  - Release Year: 2019

Details: This album features 18 recordings with over 30 young performers aged 11–27 including Emerald Butler; Warren Carnes; Phillip Cross; Landon Fitzpatrick; Nicholas Hickman; Trevor Holder; Kings Springs Road of Johnson City, Tenn. including Tyler Griffith, Owen Schinkel, Kylie Anderson, Josh Meade, and Max Silverstein; Isaac Moore; Mountain Cove Bluegrass Band of Chattanooga, Tenn. including Eli Beard, Cody Harvey, Colin Mabry, Wil Markham, Tyler Martelli, and Chris Brown; Matthew Nave; Wally O'Donald; Drew Sherrill; SingAkadamie including Jacob Trotter, Grant Lewellen, Nicholas Hickman, Lilly Anne York, Haleigh Grey, Kayla Starks, Chelsea Brewster, Logan Lynne and Kiersten Suttles; Landon Wall; and Tyler West. . Notable for reaching #1 on the June 2019 Top 50 APD Americana Global Charts, it includes original songs, standards, and covers. Supported by various grants and features guest appearances by Jeff Hullender among others.

- Singles:
  - AirPlay Direct Digital Release
    - "It's A Hard Road to Make Love Easy"
    - "How Could I Go?"
    - "What About All These American Flags?"
    - "Wash Day"
    - "Time for the Blues"
    - "Midnight Train"
    - "Filling the River with Tears"
    - "Someone Greater Than I"
    - "I Believe He Spoke to Me"
    - "The Star Spangled Banner"
    - "When We All Get to Heaven & Blessed Assurance"
    - "Farther Along"
    - "I Want to Be Ready"
    - "Baby's Coming Home"
    - "Piano Man"
    - "Traveler's Lantern;"
    - "Been Gone A Long Time;"
    - "Old Spinning Wheel."

Albums Continued:

- "Faith Will See Us Through"
  - Artist: Randall Franks
  - Label: Crimson Records/Share America Foundation
  - Release Year: 2020

Details: A collection of gospel songs from various performances on TV, radio, and DVD. Features collaborations with the Watkins Family, Peachtree Pickers, and members of Hollywood Hillbilly Jamboree. Includes the track "God's Children" which hit #1 on Cashbox Magazine's Bluegrass Gospel chart in February 2023.

- Singles:
- From AirPlay Direct Digital Radio Release:
    - All songs from the album are noted for radio release
- "The American's Creed"
  - Artist: Randall Franks
  - Label: Crimson Records/Share America Foundation
  - Release Year: 2024

Details: This album reached #7 on the AirPlay Direct Global Americana album chart. It features music from Franks's film of the same name, including collaborations with guitarist Wesley Crider and live performances with the Hollywood Hillbilly Jamboree. Notably, it contains three 40th Anniversary recordings with Bill Monroe and the Blue Grass Boys.

- Singles:
  - From AirPlay Direct Digital Radio Release:
    - All songs from the album "The American's Creed" were released for digital radio play, showcasing the variety and depth of the album's content.

== Chart Songs ==
This chart information highlights Randall Franks's most significant chart performances across various genres and chart compilers, including Cashbox Magazine, APD (AirPlay Direct), and others. It covers both single and album releases from 1990 to 2025.

Singles:

- "God's Children" with the Watkins Family
- #1 on the Cashbox Magazine Bluegrass Gospel Charts (February 1, 2023)
- "He's Never Gonna Fool Me Again"
- #1 on the IBA Bluegrass/Americana Charts (December 19, 2013)
- "Old Joe Clark"
- #1 on the IBM BSM Global Chart (September 16, 2013)
- "Bonaparte's Retreat"
- #13 on the CMG/BSM Americana/Bluegrass Top 20 (March 28, 2014)
- #28 on the CMG Radio Country Music Chart Top 100 (March 28, 2014)
- "Filling the River with Tears"
- #25 on the APD Top 50 Americana Global Singles (June 2019)
- "What About All These American Flags"
- #29 on the APD Top 50 Americana Global Singles (June 2019)
- "The Kind of Love I Can't Forget" with Peanut Faircloth
- #42 on the APD Top 50 Country/Alternative Global Singles (June 2019)
- "What It Was, Was Football"
- #28 on The Nashville Spin Chart (January 2025)
- #67 on The Nashville Spin Chart (December 2024)

"Americana Youth of Southern Appalachia" Singles (June 2019):

- #11 "Farther Along" - Isaac Moore
- #16 "When We All Get to Heaven & Blessed Assurance" - Colton Brown
- #18 "The Star-Spangled Banner" - SingAkadamie (Sheri Thrower)
- #19 "I Want to Be Ready" - Mountain Cove Bluegrass Band
- #24 "It's A Hard Road to Make Love Easy" - Ryan Stinson
- #25 "Filling the River with Tears" - Randall Franks with Mountain Cove Bluegrass Band
- #27 "Piano Man" - Colton Brown
- #28 "I Believe He Spoke to Me" - Nicholas Hickman with SingAkadamie
- #29 "What About All These American Flags?" - Randall Franks
- #33 "Been Gone A Long Time" - Wally O'Donald and SingAkadamie
- #34 "Someone Greater Than I" - Ryan Stinson with Jeff Hullender (The Hullender Family)
- #36 "Old Spinning Wheel" - Landon Fitzpatrick
- #39 "Midnight Train" - Phillip Cross
- #40 "Baby's Coming Home" - Caleb Lewis
- #49 "How Could I Go?" - Emerald Butler

=== Chart Albums ===
"Americana Youth of Southern Appalachia"

- #1 on the APD Top 50 Americana/Grassicana Global Albums (June 2019)
- #1 on the APD Top 50 Global Albums (February 13, 2021)
- #8, #16, #19 on the APD Top 50 Global Albums (May 2020)
- #9 on the Top 50 Global Albums All Genres (June 2019)
- #10 on the APD Top 50 Americana/Grassicana Global Albums (February 2020)

"In the Heat of the Night Cast and Friends Christmas Time's A Comin'"

- #1 on the APD Top 50 Christmas Global Albums (October 2019)
- #2 on the APD Top 50 Global Albums (December 2019)
- #4 on the APD Top 50 Global Albums (October 17, 2021)
- #36 on the Top 50 ALLTIME APD Holiday/Christmas Albums

"The American's Creed"

- #7 on the APD Top 50 Global Americana Album (April 2024)

"Faith Will See Us Through"

- #10 on the APD Top 50 Global Albums (April 26, 2021)
- #20 & #45 on the APD Top 50 Global Albums (June 2020)

"God's Children"

- #16 on the APD Top 50 Bluegrass/Folk Global Albums (July 2019)

"Keep 'Em Smilin'"

- #18 on the APD Top 50 Christian/Gospel Global Albums (June 2019)

"Handshakes and Smiles"

- #18 on the Top 20 Christian Sales Charts by The Music City News (June 1990)

"Mountain Opry Memories"

- #20 on the APD Top 50 Bluegrass/Folk Global Albums (June 2019)

"APD Music Page"

- #12 on the APD Top 50 Christian/Gospel Global Albums (June 2019)
- #25 on the APD Top 50 Global Albums (January 25, 2022)

== Recording Executive & Producer ==
Recording Executive & Producer Randall Franks held the position of director of A&R for MBM Records and its associated labels, including Encore and ASL, where he also managed the operations of the company's publishing arm. Additionally, he worked with Atteiram Records, a bluegrass label, serving as a graphic artist and liner note writer. His contributions included designing album covers and cassette inserts for numerous artists such as The Crain Brothers, Appalachian Express, James Monroe, Jim Southern and Southern Sounds, Joe Stuart and Carl Sauceman, Brother Birch Monroe, Frank Buchanan, Carl Story and the Rambling Mountaineers, Vic Jordan, The Ridgerunners, The Boyd Brothers, Hubert Cox and the Southern Grass, The Blue Ridge Gentlemen, The Pinnacle Boys, and Southwind.

=== In the Heat of the Night Christmas ===
Randall Franks and Alan Autry collaborated through Autry-Franks Productions to produce a charity CD titled "Christmas Time's A Comin'" featuring the cast of "In the Heat of the Night," including Carroll O'Connor, Howard Rollins, Anne-Marie Johnson, David Hart, Geoffrey Thorne, Crystal Fox, Wilbur Fitzgerald, Sharon Pratt, and others. Released in 1991 by Sonlite and MGM/UA labels, the album was intended to raise funds for drug abuse prevention charities. Franks produced the project, with Autry performing "Rudolph the Red-Nosed Reindeer" as a tribute to Gene Autry, and Franks contributing an original song, "Let's Live Everyday Like It was Christmas," with Grand Ole Opry stars The Whites. They also performed together on "Jingle Bells" and the title track. The album featured contributions from several music legends, including Country Music Hall of Famers Kitty Wells, Jimmy Dickens, and Pee Wee King, as well as bluegrass icons like Jim and Jesse to the Lewis Family. In 2012, to celebrate its 20th anniversary, Autry and Franks re-released the album through the Share America Foundation, Inc. In 2019, the CD was distributed to worldwide radio via AirPlay Direct, where it achieved the #1 spot. By 2022, it had reached #36 on the AirPlay Direct Top 50 Global Holiday/Christmas Albums chart. In 2022, the album hit #36 on the AirPlay Direct Top 50 Global Holiday/Christmas Albums

== Music publishing ==
In the early 1980s, Randall Franks founded Peach Picked Publishing, affiliated with Broadcast Music Inc. (BMI). Initially, the company managed music created by Franks and his collaborators. While Franks has composed songs for other major publishers like Lowery Music Group, Chris White Music, and Chestnut Mound Publishing, he maintains a relationship with Peach Picked Publishing. One notable composition from this company is "Filling the River with Tears," which was recorded by David Davis and the Warrior River Boys. Over the years, Peach Picked Publishing has expanded its catalog to include works from prominent artists such as Bluegrass Hall of Fame members Chubby Wise and Curly Seckler, and Georgia Music Hall of Fame member Cotton Carrier, alongside recordings by artists like Marty Stuart, Ralph Stanley, and The Grateful Dead.. Later, Franks established Randall Franks Music to manage publishing and music catalogs for other artists, assisting them in negotiating royalties from various media worldwide. Through this venture, he has worked with artists including Ramblin' "Doc" Tommy Scott, Bill Monroe, Jim and Jesse, Flatt & Scruggs and the Foggy Mountain Boys, and Curly Seckler.

== Awards and Recognitions ==
Randall Franks has been recognized with numerous honors in the music industry. He has been inducted into several halls of fame, including the:

- Atlanta Country Music Hall of Fame (2004)
- North Georgia Musicians Wall of Fame (2009)
- Independent Country Music Hall of Fame (2013)
- America's Old Time Country Music Hall of Fame (2019)
- Tri-State Gospel Music Hall of Fame (2022)

In 2010, the Carolinas Country, Bluegrass and Gospel Hall of Fame honored him with the Legend Award and the title "Appalachian Ambassador of the Fiddle." Locally, he was inducted into the Catoosa County Chamber Business Person Hall of Fame and named Catoosa County Patriotic Citizen of the Year in 2020.

As part of the cast of "In the Heat of the Night," Franks was associated with the series when it won NAACP Awards for Outstanding Drama Series in 1992 and 1993, and received Golden Globe nominations for Best Television Drama in 1990 and 1991. He also appeared in the film "The Cricket's Dance," which garnered awards at various film festivals for Best Feature Film and Best Ensemble Cast.

Franks has received several awards and nominations in his music career:

- Fiddlin' John Carson Award
- A.S.E. Male Vocalist of the Year
- Cotton Carrier Award
- Little Jimmy Dempsey Musician Award
- Sons of the American Revolution Citizenship Award
- Josie Awards Nominee 2023 & 2024 for Inspirational Vocalist of the Year and Musician of the Year (Fiddle)
- Josie Awards Winner 2024 for Musician of the Year (Fiddle)
- Josie Awards Nominee 2025 for Social Impact Video of the Year (Duo/Group/Collab)

In 2004, Catoosa County officially recognized him as "Appalachian Ambassador of the Fiddle." The Governor of Kentucky acknowledged his contributions to the music of Bill Monroe. In 2009, the Atlanta Society of Entertainers named him Songwriter of the Year for "The Old Black Fiddle." This organization also awarded his band, the Georgia Mafia Bluegrass Band, as Bluegrass Band of the Year multiple times from 2010 to 2018. The International Bluegrass Music Hall of Fame and Museum in Owensboro, Kentucky recognized him as a Bluegrass Legend during its 2010 and 2011 Pioneers of Bluegrass Gatherings. Franks performed at the Appalachian Regional Commission's annual conference in 2010 and was nominated for a Diamond Award in the Top Bluegrass Artist category that year.

Museum Exhibition and State Recognition

From 1996 to 2007, the Georgia Music Hall of Fame and Museum in Macon showcased an exhibit dedicated to Randall Franks's career within its Skillet Licker Café section. This exhibit was displayed alongside exhibits of other notable Georgia musicians such as Alan Jackson, Travis Tritt, and Trisha Yearwood. In 2013, Georgia Governor Nathan Deal honored Franks with a special commendation for his community service and philanthropy in the state, coinciding with Franks's receipt of the Kiwanis International Distinguished Service Award.

== Charitable and Community Involvement ==
Randall Franks is actively engaged in numerous charitable and community organizations. He serves as the president of the Share America Foundation, which awards the Pearl and Floyd Franks Scholarship to support youth in continuing Appalachian musical arts. He has held multiple terms as chairman for the Catoosa Citizens for Literacy (2002–04, 2007–09, 2022–23, 2023–24), where he helps manage the Catoosa County Learning Center, providing assistance in literacy, GED preparation, and basic computer skills. Franks also acts as the treasurer for the Catoosa County Local Emergency Planning Committee, which coordinates emergency response efforts. In the film industry, he has been involved with the Georgia Production Partnership, holding positions such as vice president and secretary. His local community involvement includes memberships in the Boynton Lions Club, Catoosa Family Collaborative, Nathan Anderson Cemetery Committee, Catoosa Fuller Center for Housing, Catoosa County Chamber of Commerce, and the Catoosa County Historical Society. He has previously served as president of the Kiwanis Club of Ringgold. In the music industry, Franks founded the SouthEastern Bluegrass Music Association (SEBA) and serves as a board advisor for the Southern Gospel Music Hall of Fame. and serves as a board advisor for the Southern Gospel Music Hall of Fame. Additionally, he contributes as a field researcher for various museums in the Southern United States.

== Public Service ==
Randall Franks served on the Ringgold, Georgia city council for four terms, from June 2009 to December 31, 2021. During his time in office, he held roles such as Vice Mayor and Council Chairman. In addition to his elected positions, Franks also volunteered in appointed roles within the city government. He was the Chairman of the Ringgold Downtown Development Authority and vice chairman of the Ringgold Convention and Visitor's Bureau, with his service in these roles spanning approximately a decade.
