= Educating My Father =

- Directed by: Giorgos Lazaridis; Nikos Tsiforos
- Written by: Giorgos Lazaridis; Spyros Melas (play)
- Cinematography: Kostas Theodoridis
- Edited by: Giorgos Tsaoulis
- Production company: Anzervos
- Distributed by: Anzervos
- Release date: 1953
- Running time: 78 minutes
- Country: Greece
- Language: Greek

Educating My Father (Greek: O babas ekpaidevetai) is a 1953 Greek comedy film directed by Giorgos Lazaridis and Nikos Tsiforos and starring Petros Kyriakos, Sasa Dario and Giorgos Kabanellis.

== Cast ==
- Petros Kyriakos as Prokopis Kolaouzos
- Sasa Dario as Riri
- Giorgos Kabanellis as Giannis Kolaouzos
- Gelly Mavropoulou as Myrto
- Nicos Matheos as Skouratzos
- Nana Papadopoulou as Riri's Mother
- Alekos Anastasiadis as Nikolas
- Dimitris Aviatis
- Kostas Pomonis
- Kostas Papakonstantinou
- Dimitris Koukis as Alex Vranas
- Nasos Patetsos as Singer
- Zozo Sapountzaki as Singer
- Sofy as Dancer
- Vallas as Dancer
- Kostas Voutsas

== Bibliography ==
- Achilleas Hadjikyriacou. Masculinity and Gender in Greek Cinema: 1949-1967. Bloomsbury Publishing, 2013.
