= Eileen Winterton =

English actress (1903–2004)

- Born: Eileen Rosa Windridge; 5 July 1903; Purley, Surrey, England
- Died: 1 May 2004 (aged 100); Watford, Hertfordshire, England
- Occupations: Actress and dancer
- Years active: 1911/1912–at least 1985

Eileen Rosa Windridge (5 July 1903 – 1 May 2004), known professionally as Eileen Winterton, was an English actress known for her roles in Theatre 625 and Doctor Who.

== Biography ==
Winterton began her career at the age of eight, dancing in C. Hayden Coffin's production of Br'er Rabbit at the Little Theatre in London. She trained as a ballet dancer at the Paris Opera House and also received training from Nikolai Legat. Her first solo appearance was with the Carl Rosa Opera Company. This led to performing with Lydia Kyasht, a production of Rubaiyat of Omar Khayyam and cabaret in London, Paris and the South of France, as well as dancing before Sophia of Prussia and her daughters plus other distinguished people at private parties in many countries.

=== Career ===
Eileen Winterton is best known for her appearance in Theatre 625 in 1965 and her uncredited roles in the Doctor Who serials Day of the Daleks (1972) and State of Decay (1980). She also appeared in two 1967 episodes of The Prisoner.

== See also ==
- List of centenarians (actors, filmmakers and entertainers)
