= Radio Bari =

The Radio Bari station, broadcasting from Bari in southern Italy, with a power of 20 kW, was commissioned by the Italian national broadcasting company, EIAR, in 1932.

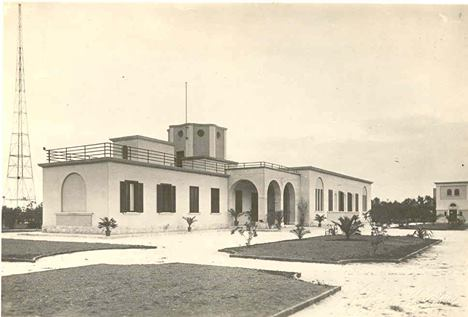
The building in 1932.

One of the leading proponents of Radio Bari was Italian admiral and senator Angelo Ugo Conz, who served in the Senate of the Kingdom of Italy together with Guglielmo Marconi, inventor of the radio and Nobel laureate. Admiral Conz (Regia Marina) was a decorated veteran of both the Italo-Turkish War of 1911-1912 and World War One. Admiral Conz was instrumental in the adoption by the Italian Navy (Regia Marina) of Marconi's "wireless telegraph" for sightless communication between naval ships, first during the Italo-Turkish War and then during World War One (Marconi was given the rank of commander in the Italian Navy in recognition of his contribution). For the creation of Arabic programming for the Radio Bari project, Admiral Conz enlisted the assistance of a Lebanese Maronite priest residing in Rome and teaching Arabic at the University of Rome, Monsignor Pietro Sfair.

== Radio Bari during the Fascist Regime ==
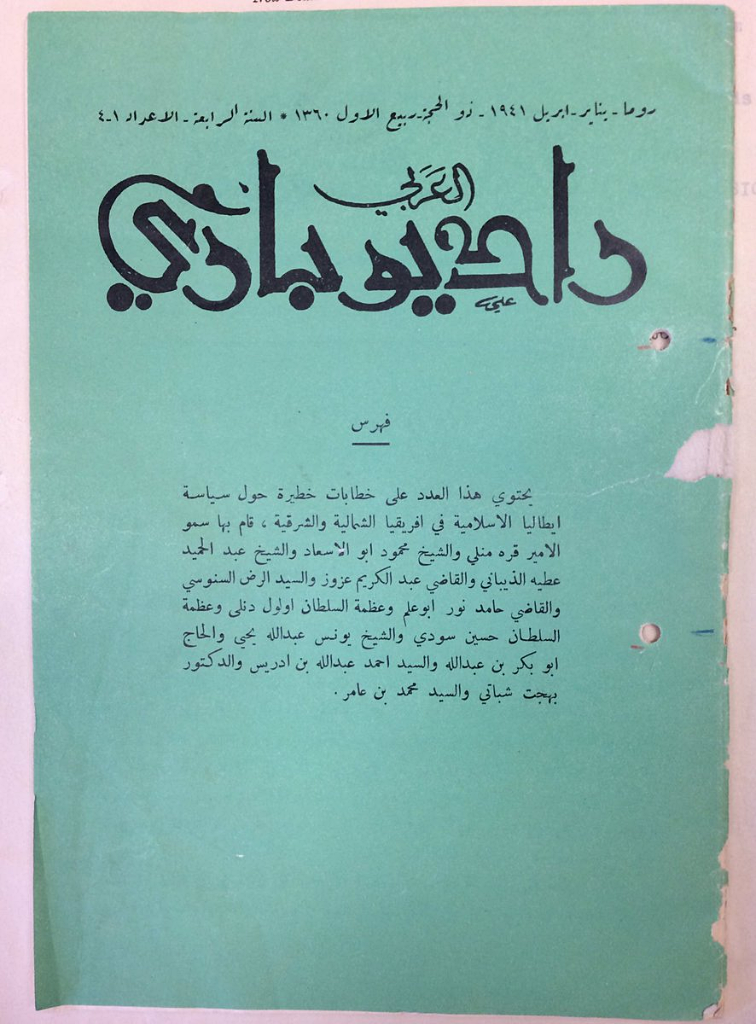
Radio Araba di Bari January – April 1941, a supplementary magazine produced by Radio Bari with details of its Arabic broadcasts (India Office Records, British Library, IOR/R/15/5/214)

By decision of the Fascist regime, in 1934 Radio Bari started to broadcast propaganda and counter-propaganda programmes, accompanied by music and political commentaries, for listeners in Arabic-speaking countries. These broadcasts, aired at regular intervals from 10.30 a.m. until 3 a.m., were received throughout the Mediterranean basin, reaching countries including Egypt, Palestine, Iraq, Syria, Lebanon, Algeria, Tunisia and Morocco, where British or French influence was at that time predominant. A few months later, the station also began to broadcast in the Greek language. The months that followed saw a true radio war, which lasted throughout World War II, including jamming of radio signals, between the Axis and Allied radio stations.

On 8 February 1938, propaganda pamphlets advertising the station were distributed from unknown sources via employing local Arab boys on the streets of Jerusalem. The pamphlets featured a schedule of programming for the week, as well as pro-Palestine Arab Nationalist messages quotations from American and English sources.

The Bahrain branch of the Persian Gulf Radio Listeners' Committee in 1943 discussed whether it would behoove BBC Arabic to switch its program formatting to better compete with Radio Bari and Radio Zeesen. The committee concluded that it didn't matter because not many people listened to Radio Bari.

== Radio Bari during the Resistance ==
On 8 September 1943, the Bari transmitter, one of the few still operating in southern Italy, was peacefully occupied by a group of local intellectuals politically close to the philosopher Benedetto Croce together with groups of anti-fascists, republicans, democrats and activists of the Action Party. With the help of some radio technicians, they were able to transmit on 11 September the first message of the King of Italy, Victor Emanuel III, after his departure from Rome. Radio Bari was thus able to broadcast the first broadcast of free Italy. Starting from 23 September 1943, the premises of Radio Bari were occupied by the Americans who immediately made it the organ of their headquarters in Algiers. The core programme was Italia combatte (Italy fights on) in which, while complying with the directives of the Allied Command, the speakers targeted the public opinion of southern Italy with interesting features full of news and testimonies from the front, as well as on guerrilla actions, together with information for partisans and anti-fascist propaganda. These political programmes were supported by "a lot of music for which an entire record store was seized". In his 2011 history of the British Special Operations Executive (SOE) in Italy in the years 1943-45, David Stafford says:

Contact with resistance groups was also maintained through Radio Bari. This was a station under allied control from which, every night at 2030 GMT, a special resistance programme, produced jointly by No. 1 Special Force and the Political Warfare Board Executive, was broadcast throughout Italy. It was through this link that general directives were sent to resistance groups, and that reception committees were alerted to supply drops. It would also be the means by which the resistance in general would be ordered to act when the signal was given."
