= Randolph Hokanson =

American pianist

Randolph Henning Hokanson (June 22, 1915 – October 18, 2018) was an American pianist and professor emeritus at the University of Washington in Seattle. He was noted for his recordings of Bach, Schubert, Beethoven, Chopin, Liszt and Mendelssohn, and gave over 100 performances, including the complete cycle of Beethoven sonatas.

Hokanson was born in the state of Washington in June 1915 as the fifth of eleven children of a family of Swedish immigrants in Bellingham. He began playing the piano at the age of eight, and by the age of fifteen, he had begun giving recitals regularly in Seattle and Victoria, British Columbia. After high school, he studied in London on a scholarship with Harold Samuel, Myra Hess and Carl Friedberg and later performed as soloist under Thomas Beecham, Pierre Monteux, Arthur Fiedler, Walter Susskind, Milton Katims, and others. He toured the United States and Canada for eight years. He was part of the University of Washington music faculty from 1949 to 1984. He was still performing at the age of 90.

In 2011, he released a memoir, With Head to the Music Bent: A Musician's Story. He was married to composer Dorothy Cadzow (August 9, 1916 – June 26, 2001) from 1951 until her death. Hokanson gave a concert of pieces by Bach, Mozart and Chopin in Bayview Manor Albertson Hall, Seattle, on June 21, 2015, the day before his 100th birthday. He died on 18 October 2018 at the age of 103.

== See also ==
- List of centenarians (musicians, composers and music patrons)
