= Ente Italiano per le Audizioni Radiofoniche =

Public broadcaster in Fascist Italy

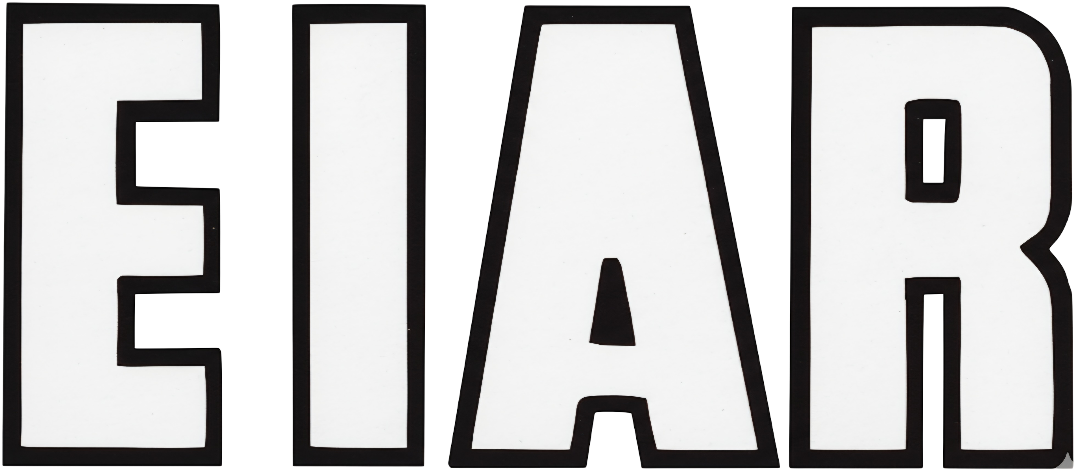

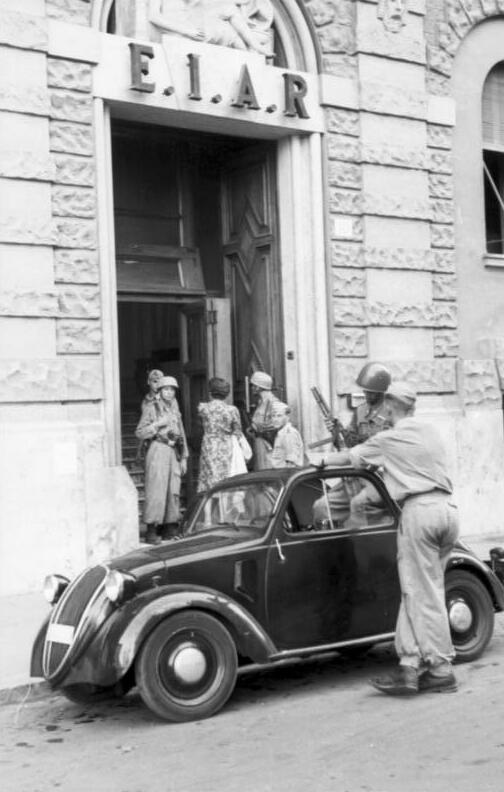
- Fallschirmjäger paratroopers in front of EIAR Rome headquarters (1943)
- Type: Radio broadcasting
- Country: Kingdom of Italy; Italian Social Republic
- Availability: National and international
- Owner: Società Idroelettrica Piemonte
- Launch date: 17 November 1927
- Dissolved: 26 October 1944
- Replaced by: RAI (1944 to present)

Ente Italiano per le Audizioni Radiofoniche (EIAR, "Italian Body for Radio Broadcasting") was the public service broadcaster in Fascist Italy and the only entity permitted to broadcast by the government.

== History ==
In spite of the fact that the radio was chiefly the result of the work of the Italian inventor Guglielmo Marconi, when Mussolini seized power in October 1922 Italy was considerably behind other countries in the development of a nationwide broadcasting system. Indeed, not one regularly operated broadcasting transmitter has been built in Italy and radio was still largely in the experimental stage.

The origins of radio broadcasting in Italy date to 1924, when URI (Unione radiofonica italiana) was set up, its share of capital being divided between Radiofono (Italian Company for Circular Radio Communications) which was the majority shareholder, and SIRAC (Italian Company for Circular Radio Listening). In the same year, on 6 October, the Rome station of URI began the first Italian radio broadcasting service. Thereafter, by means of an exclusive 6-year concession, the state entrusted the provision of circular radio listening services to URI. Three years later, by Royal Decree (Royal Decree No. 2207 of 17 November 1927), URI became the Ente Italiano per le Audizioni Radiofoniche (EIAR). The new company was granted an exclusive concession for broadcasting for the following 25 years. In 1931, EIAR was indirectly controlled by SIP (Hydroelectric Company of Piedmont): in 1933, SIP gained the absolute majority shareholding in EIAR. Although formally autonomous, EIAR was subject to strict government regulation with regard to political broadcasting. Before the appointment, the president and the managing director had to be approved by the Italian Government. The man chosen to supervise all the music on the new radio network was the famous opera composer Pietro Mascagni. The regular broadcasting of news started on 7 January 1929 when, at the insistence of the government, a radio journal was created called Radiogiornale, which provided daily coverage of the most important national and international news.

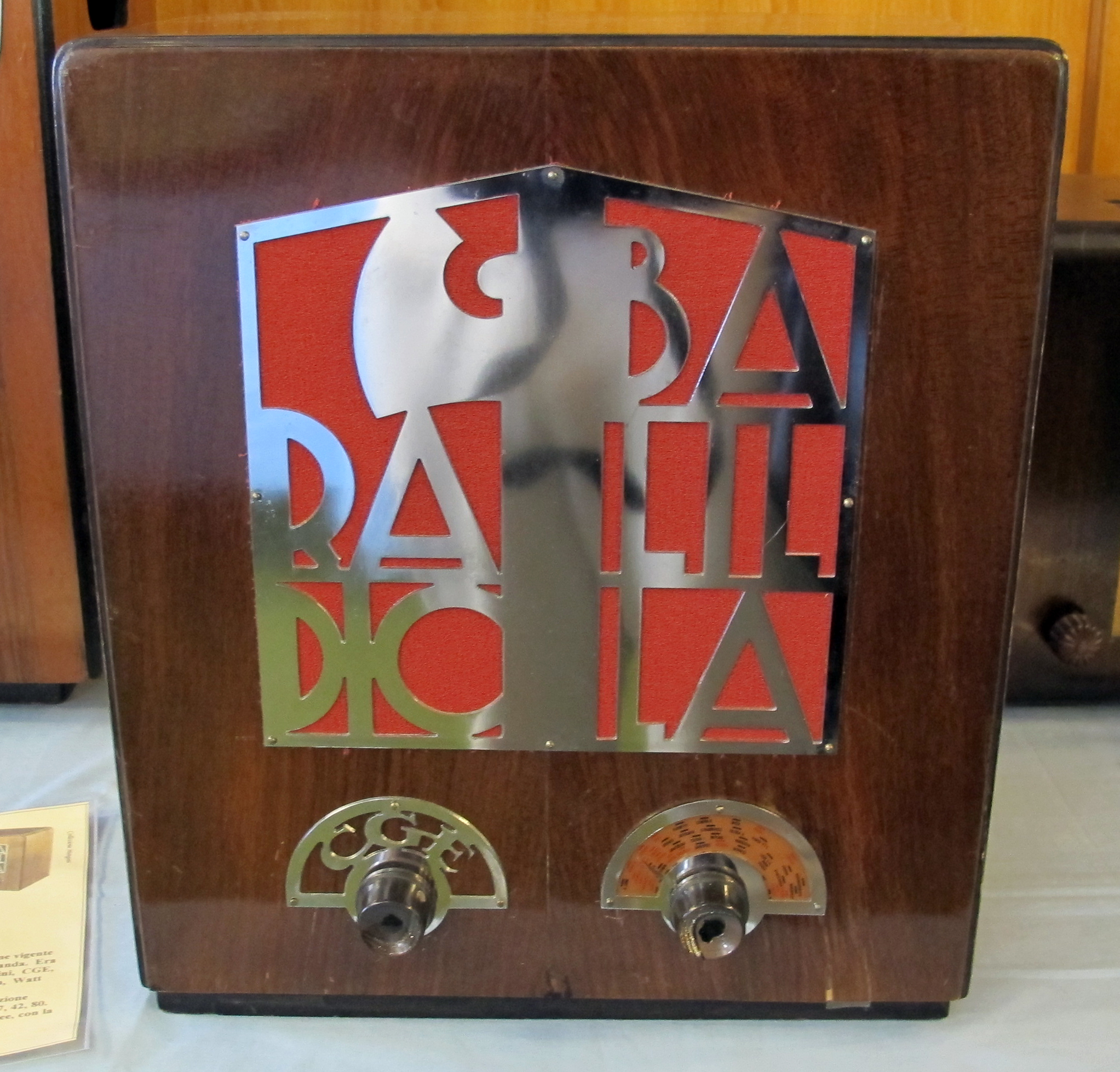
Radiobalilla, the first Italian mass-produced radio set, 1937

Under EIAR, radio broadcasting became the major means of mass communication in Italy. EIAR demanded annual (paid) subscriptions from every radio owner. The number of subscribers grew dramatically from 40,678 in 1927 to 800,000 in 1937. However, the spread of radios throughout the national territory was markedly slower in Italy than in the other main European countries or in America. Despite its growth, EIAR's subscription rates were still below those in Nazi Germany and the UK, respectively 2,000,000 and 2,500,000 subscribers. Realizing that the radio was a powerful tool of control and propaganda, the Fascist government urged companies to build cheap devices for the mass market. In May 1937 Radiobalilla was born; it cost only 430 lire (or around $22). These three-tube tuned radio frequency receivers were manufactured until 1944 in several versions, all sporting the symbol of Fascism, the fascio littorio. In 1940 the EIAR reached 1,200,000 subscribers. In conjunction with the spreading of the radio, the circulation of Radio Orario, the official magazine of EIAR, reached 8 million copies per year.

On 21 March 1938, the EIAR began transmitting a second, separately programmed radio service in major cities.

Between 1929 and 1939, the EIAR presented the first television broadcasting tests in Italy. On 22 July 1939, the first television transmitter at the EIAR station came into operation in Rome, which performed a regular broadcast for about a year using a 441-line system that was developed in Germany. In September of the same year, a second television transmitter was installed in Milan, making experimental broadcasts during major events in the city. An early signing to the TV station in 1939 was the Italian singer Lia Origoni and a film was made to record her performance. The broadcasts were suddenly ended on 31 May 1940, by order of the government, allegedly because of interferences encountered in the first air navigation systems. Also, the imminent participation in the war is believed to have played a role in this decision. After Operation Achse, EIAR transmitting equipment was relocated to Germany by the German troops. Lately, it was returned to Italy.

During the first years of radio broadcasting, the Italian government showed little interest in the new medium, perhaps still unaware of its immense potential. Although Mussolini's speeches were broadcast by the EIAR, the majority of programming in the early years was uncontroversial, entertainment and music-led. Mussolini was deeply suspicious at first of the radio as an instrument of mass media, and his diffidence only began to abate in the early thirties, when the regime began systematically to use the microphones of the ElAR to celebrate national events, to chronicle public manifestations, and to offer the first political commentary. By the 1930s the amount of propaganda broadcast by EIAR increased considerably. In 1931, only 22% of EIAR radio programmes had clear propaganda content. This percentage increased to 33% in 1938. In the summer of 1936, the Italians heard the first dissenting voices when antifascist propaganda was broadcast from Spain. The ElAR countered with a series of programmes singing the praises of Franco's Spain. During World War II, EIAR became one of the most important tools of Fascist propaganda. Between 23 January 1941 and 28 March 1945, American poet Ezra Pound recorded or composed hundreds of broadcasts for EIAR. Broadcast in English, and sometimes in Italian, German, and French, the EIAR programme was transmitted to England, central Europe, and the United States. As the Allied invasion of Italy progressed, the Fascist government of Benito Mussolini decided to try to emulate the German radio's Axis Sally broadcasts of Mildred Gillars. In the summer of 1943, EIAR hired the 30-year-old Rita Zucca with this aim in mind, despite her losing a typing job in 1942 for copying an anti-Fascist pamphlet. Zucca was teamed with German broadcaster Charles Goedel in the programme Jerry's Front Calling. Much to Gillars' chagrin, Zucca was also referred to as Axis Sally. Zucca's trademark sign-off was "a sweet kiss from Sally", and she was often mistaken for Gillars.

After the Armistice of Cassibile, all the local stations in southern Italy were taken over by the Allies, and from 23 September, the broadcasting station at Bari (one of the most powerful in Italy) was occupied by the Americans who immediately made it the organ of their headquarters in Algiers. The EIAR, whose Head Office had always been in Turin (far from the front line), continued to broadcast throughout the Italian Social Republic period. Fascist leader and journalist Ezio Maria Gray replaced Giancarlo Vallauri, the longtime president of EIAR. In the last years of the War, another important radio broadcasting in Italy on both medium and short-waves was Radio Moscow, the official international broadcasting station of the Soviet Union, whose Italian mediumwave service had been jammed under the orders of Mussolini during the late 1930s.

In October 1944, towards the end of World War II, the entity was replaced with Radio Audizioni Italiane (RAI).

== See also ==
- Radio Bari
- Censorship
- Freedom of information
- Propaganda
- Ezra Pound's radio broadcasts, 1941–1945
