= Mariuccia Medici =

Italian-born Swiss actress

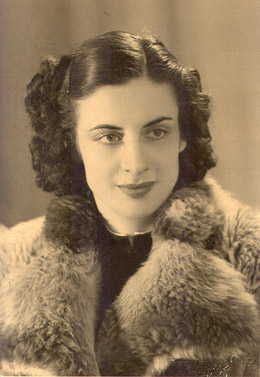
Mariuccia Medici

Mariuccia Medici (18 February 1910 in Milan – 23 February 2012 in Lugano) was an Italian-born Swiss actress, known for roles in television and theatre.

She performed many of her works in the Ticinese and Swiss Italian dialects used in Ticino. In 2001, she penned an opinion piece on the importance of the preservation of the dialects in swissinfo. Medici worked as a primary school teacher for more than forty years in Lugano, where she died on 23 February 2012, aged 102.

== See also ==
- List of centenarians (actors, filmmakers and entertainers)
