= Sasa Dario =

Greek ballet dancer and actress (born 1926)

- Σάσα Ντάριο
- Born: Anastasia Protonotariou; 21 February 1926 (age 100); Piraeus, Greece
- Occupations: Prima Ballerina; actress; choreographer

Sasa Dario (Greek: Σάσα Ντάριο; born 21 February 1926) is a Greek prima ballerina, actress, choreographer, and dance critic. She is widely recognized as one of the prominent leading dancers of the Greek National Opera and achieved nationwide fame in Greece during the late 1970s as a permanent judge on the popular television talent show Na i Efkeria

== Early life and education ==
Born as Anastasia Protonotariou in the port city of Piraeus, she discovered her passion for dance at an early age. She pursued rigorous training under several of the most acclaimed ballet masters and choreographers of the era. She studied dance at the specialized schools of Morianov, Zouroudi, Knyazev, Preobrajenska, Lensky, Nora, Antonio Alcaraz, and De Pian.

== Career ==
Dario established herself as a premier figure in classical and modern dance within Greece, eventually rising to become the principal dancer, for the Greek National Opera. Alongside her institutional work, she collaborated extensively with independent theatrical troupes across the country.

In addition to her stage career, Dario crossed over into the Golden Age of Greek cinema during the 1950s and 1960s, working as both an actress and a choreographer. Her film credits include performance roles in My Child Must Live (1951), Educating My Father (1953), and The Money Rich (1958). Internationally, she is credited as the Prima Ballerina in Roger Corman's 1961 historical film Atlas (1961) which was shot on location in Greece. In 1977, Dario transitioned into television by joining the panel of the milestone Greek state television talent show Na i Efkeria. Serving alongside fellow prominent cultural figures such as George Katsaros, Grigoris Grigoriou, Rosita Sokou, and Lefteris Papadopoulos, her role as a sharp but constructive dance judge made her a household name.

In her later years, she has remained active in the arts community as an authoritative dance critic and mentor. She celebrated her 100th birthday in February 2026.
