= Georgette Rejewski =

Dutch actress

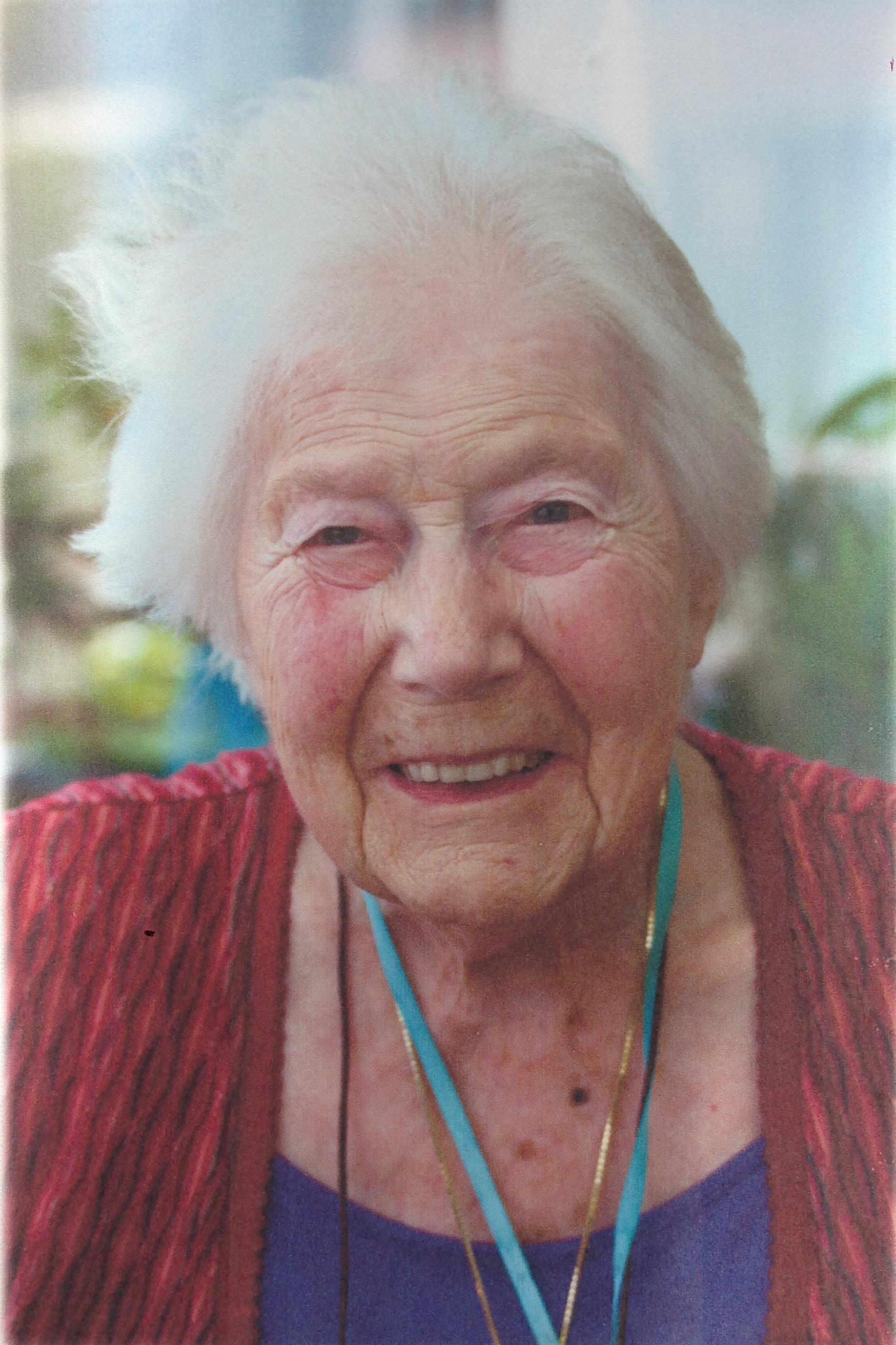
- Rejewski in 2007
- Born: 12 February 1910; Antwerp, Belgium
- Died: 21 February 2014 (aged 104); Middenbeemster, Netherlands
- Occupation: Actress
- Years active: 1959–2000

Georgette Rejewski (12 February 1910 – 21 February 2014) was a Belgian-born Dutch actress.

== Selected filmography ==
- Any Day Now (1976)
- Dokter Vlimmen (1977) - Overbuurvrouw
- A Bridge Too Far (1977) - Elderly Dutch Couple
- Twee vorstinnen en een vorst (1981) - Blind vrouwtje
- Another Mother (1996) - Moeder van Marie

== See also ==
- List of centenarians (actors, filmmakers and entertainers)
