= Helli Stehle =

- Born: Helene Louise Stehle; 6 December 1907; Basel, Switzerland
- Died: 27 August 2017 (aged 109); Basel, Switzerland
- Known for: Actress and radio presenter longevity

Helene Louise "Helli" Stehle (6 December 1907 – 27 August 2017) was a Swiss actress and radio presenter.

== Biography ==
Stehle was born on 6 December 1907 in Basel, Switzerland. She first achieved fame in Switzerland as a stage actress. She later began working in radio, performing and directing plays and reciting poetry for the state-run radio station, Radiostudio Basel, in her native Basel. In 1939, she became Switzerland's first female newscaster. She never married or had children as - in those days - only single women were allowed to work in state jobs. She was the first female spokeswoman in Radio Beromünster (now known as Radio SRF).

She turned 100 in December 2007. When she died at 109 on 27 August 2017, she was the oldest living person in Switzerland.

== See also ==
- List of centenarians (actors, filmmakers and entertainers)
