= Violet Hensley =

American luthier and musician (1916–2026)

- Hensley, in 2016

Background information
- Born: Violet Brumley; October 21, 1916; Mount Ida, Arkansas, U.S.
- Died: August 7, 2026 (aged 109) Yellville, Arkansas, U.S.
- Occupations: Luthier; musician
- Instrument: Fiddle
- Works: Old Time Fiddle Tunes
- Spouse: Adren Hensley (m. 1935; died 1997)
- Award: National Fiddler Hall of Fame

Violet Brumley Hensley (October 21, 1916 – August 7, 2026) was an American luthier and musician who made fiddles and played the fiddle in country music, recording three albums with family members. She was inducted into the National Fiddler Hall of Fame at age 101.

== Early life ==
Violet Hensley was born in Mount Ida, Arkansas, on October 21, 1916, to George Washington Brumley and Nora (née Springer). She had two sisters. Her mother died when she was age 11. Her father was farmer and a musician who had made fiddles since age 14 and she learned the craft from him, making her first fiddle, for herself, at age 15. She made three more before she was 18.

In 1935, she married Adren Hensley. The couple had nine children and she ceased to make fiddles for twenty-seven years to focus on her family. In 1961, Hensley began building fiddles again, making 69 more instruments, all numbered. She also repaired fiddles. In 1968, the family moved to Yellville, Arkansas, where she had her workshop. She said in an interview that she could have made more fiddles for the time she "spent gardening, canning, sewing and cutting her neighbors' hair". She "made lye soap, tanned leather, broke horses and tended crops", and also worked as a cleaner in a hospital for years. Her husband died in 1997.

== Public attention ==
Hensley's expertise on fiddles gave her national attention when she was featured in the magazine National Geographic in 1970. She was invited to television shows, to The Beverly Hillbillies in 1969, The Art Linkletter Show in 1970, Captain Kangaroo in 1977, and to Live with Regis and Kathie Lee in 1992. She was featured in Mature Living in 1987, and in Country Woman in 1991. During the 1980s, Hensley appeared weekly on KCTT in Yellville. She was featured on Ozarks Public Television (KOZK/KOZJ) at Missouri State University in Springfield in 2006, in a program Handcrafted Musical Instruments. She was featured on The Bob Braun Show and on CBS Evening News. She was often called "the Stradivarius of the Ozarks".

== Recording ==
In the early 1970s, Hensley and family members such as daughters Lewonna Nelson and Sandra Flagg, son Calvin Hensley, and husband Adren Hensley, recorded Old-Time Hoedowns. They released a first album, Old Time Fiddle Tunes, in 1974. They released two more albums, The Whittling Fiddler and Family in 1983, and Family Treasures in 2004. For the last album, her son-in-law, guitarist Tim Nelson, replaced her husband.

== Later life ==
Due to failing vision, Hensley stopped making complete fiddles later in life, but kept making parts in the process, and also teaching others the craft and playing. In 2014, Hensley published her autobiography Whittlin' and Fiddlin' My Own Way: The Violet Hensley Story. It was co-authored by the American actor and musician Randall Franks. Hensley turned 100 years old on October 21, 2016, making her a centenarian.

Hensley died in Yellville, Arkansas, on August 7, 2026, at the age of 109. She was preceded in death by four of her sons, seven grandchidren, and one great-great-grandson. Her descendants include 32 grandchildren, 85 great-grandchildren, 29 great-great-grandchildren, and 2 great-great-great-grandchildren.

== Awards ==
Hensley received the Living Treasure Award from Silver Dollar City in Branson, Missouri, in 1997 and was inducted into its Hall of Fame; she appeared there at its 2007 National Crafts Festival the 41st consecutive time.

In 2004, the Department of Arkansas Heritage honored Hensley as an Arkansas living treasure. On March 30, 2018, at age 101, she was inducted into the National Fiddler Hall of Fame. She also received local awards.
