= Diamantina Rodríguez =

Spanish singer (1920–2021)

- Born: 14 September 1920; Villaxime, Quirós, Spain
- Died: 21 April 2021 (aged 100); Noreña, Spain
- Occupation: singer

Diamantina Rodríguez (14 September 1920 – 21 April 2021) was a Spanish singer. She was named as one of the most important Asturian singers of the twentieth century. She began her career in 1948 in a contest, where she placed second. She recorded her first album in 1969, and died in 2021 aged 100.

== Career ==
In her childhood she heard the voice of the singer Obdulia Álvarez, "La Busdonga", on a gramophone, who would become her inspiration. In 1932, at the age of twelve, she met the piper Argimiro Fernández with whom she formed a musical duo, she playing the tambourine, which toured the patron saint festivals of the region. Four years later, in 1936, Diamantina and Argimiro were married before he participated in the Spanish Civil War.

In 1939 she moved with her husband to Ribera de Arriba, where she began her musical career as a singer of Asturian tunes. In 1948 she obtained second place in the traditional song contest carried out by the newspaper Región, the first time that she appeared in a contest. José Menéndez Carreño "Cuchichi" participated as a jury member became her teacher. In 1955 she ran again and won first place. In 1950 she moved to Mieres del Camino. The 1960s were a very prolific time in musical performances and in regional competitions that increased her fame in Asturias. She was also able to tour in Asturian centers in various locations in Spain. In 1968 she joined the Asturian Song Champions Company Asturias Canta and made an appearance on the television series La casa de los Martínez on TVE. In 1969 she participated in the Asturias Patria Querida compilation, after which she published several albums, her seoncd was published in 1971 and she dedicated to the songbook by Eduardo Martínez Torner. The following year she recorded La verde Asturias and in 1973 published Asturian Songs, which was released on two discs. In 1981 she recorded to the mothers of the miners.

Rodríguez died in Noreña on 21 April 2021, aged 100.

== Awards and tributes ==
On 30 October 1998, the Oviedo City Council approved the naming of one of the new La Corredoria roads as "Calle Diamantina Rodríguez".

On 1 October 2001, the Quirós City Council named her Favourite Daughter of the council, an honour she shared with the musician Manuel Rodríguez Osorio, better known as Manolo Quirós.

In 2002 she was awarded a Silver Medal of Asturias, a distinction granted by the Government of the Principality of Asturia, in recognition of her artistic career and her contribution to the recovery of Asturian musical heritage.

From 2003, she was on the jury of the Silvino Argüelles Memorial, which awards the awards to the ten best traditional tune singers of the year.

In 2005 the singer Anabel Santiago presented a tribute album Anabel Santiago sings to Diamantina Rodríguez.

On 31 October 2009, the Council of Mieres inaugurated the Centro d'Estudios de l'Asturianada Diamantina Rodríguez, whose objective is the documentation, research and exhibition of l'asturianada, a genre of traditional Asturian music.

== Discography ==
Among her most important albums are:

- La verde Asturias (1972)
- Canciones Asturianas (1973)
- A las madres de los mineros (1981)

=== Compilations ===
She also participated in the following musical compilations :

- Lo mejor de Asturias (1965)
- Asturias Patria Querida (1969)
- Con voz de muyer (2004)

=== Collaborations ===
She also made collaborations:

- From L.laciana I come (2004), by Rosario González
