= George Katsaros =

Greek-American rebetiko musician

George T. Katsaros
- Born: George Theologitis; December 19, 1888; Amorgos, Kingdom of Greece
- Died: June 22, 1997 (aged 108) Tarpon Springs, Florida, US
- Genre: Rebetiko
- Occupations: Singer, songwriter, musician
- Instruments: Guitar
- Years active: 1895-1995

George Theologitis (December 19, 1888 – June 22, 1997), known professionally as George T. Katsaros, was a Greek-American rebetiko singer, songwriter and guitarist, known for compositions of romantic ballads in the old style. During a career spanning close to 100 years starting from when he was a young child in Greece, he performed in venues ranging from Greek restaurants, to ballrooms, hotels, clubs, and on ships traveling internationally.

== Early life ==
George Theologitis was born on December 19, 1888 in the Greek island of Amorgos. His mother worked in the royal kitchen of King Constantine I. Following his father's death, Theologitis began to perform to support his family. During this time, he adopted the stage name of Katsaros', meaning Curly, a nod to his curly hair.

== Career ==
In 1913, Theologitis emigrated from Amorgos to the United States. He found early success, performing with a Salvation Army street band a few hours after arriving in America. This opportunity led the street band to invite Theologitis to regularly perform with them. Across the next several years, he traveled the country to perform in Greek clubs in cities such as Chicago, Philadelphia, and New York.

=== Record deals ===
Following a performance at a New York cabaret five years after his arrival, Theologitis was signed to RCA Victor records in 1918. He was later contracted to Decca and Columbia Records and continued to release records throughout his career. These recordings gained popularity due to their documentation of the difficulties of immigrant life.

although his recording career was said to be less successful than his touring and live performances.

=== Musical legacy and touring ===
In 1938, Theologitis became the first Greek singer and composer to record onto a 78 RPM disc.

He temporarily retired from large-scale touring in 1958, and primarily performed locally in the Tarpon Springs area in Florida afterwards until he was more widely rediscovered by fans of rebetiko in 1987. In 1988, he toured in his native Greece and made at least one return visit in 1995. He performed until he was at least 107.

For his contributions to music, he was awarded by the Secretary of State the Florida Folk Heritage Award at the 38th Florida Folk Festival in 1990.

== Death ==
Katsaros died at his niece's home in Tarpon Springs, Florida, on June 22, 1997, at age 108.
