= Lia Origoni =

Italian actress and singer (1919–2022)

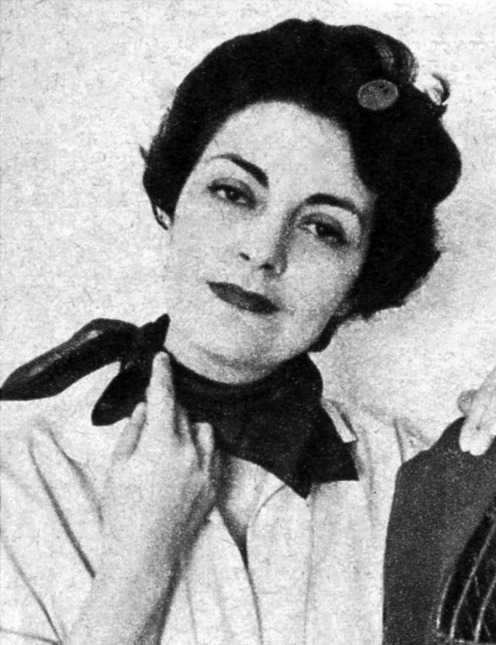
- Origoni in 1962
- Born: 20 October 1919; La Maddalena, Sardinia, Kingdom of Italy
- Died: 26 October 2022 (aged 103); La Maddalena, Sardinia, Italy
- Occupation: Singer

Lia Origoni (20 October 1919 – 26 October 2022) was an Italian singer, well known from the 1940s to the 1960s.

== Life ==
Origoni was born in La Maddalena, Sardinia, on 20 October 1919. Her uncle Giacomino Origoni had been an actor in early silent films in Italy. In 1934, she decided to focus not on her violin playing but on her soprano voice under the advice of fellow Sardinian singer Bernardo de Muro and the writer Clelia Garibaldi after she and de Muro sang in a concert to commemorate the life of Italian hero Giuseppe Garibaldi.

Origoni gave jazz concerts accompanied by pianist Giuliano Pomeranz, Leonardo Angeloni on flute and guitarist Guglielmo Paparano. In 1939, she was the first star to be signed by the fascist Italian TV station EIAR and a film was made to record her performance. The broadcast was made although at the time there were only two televisions that could receive the signal. One of these was in Villa Torlonia, the home of Benito Mussolini.

Origoni's theatrical debut was in Rome on Christmas Day 1940 in When you least expect it, a work by Michele Galdieri, starring Totò and Anna Magnani. She later said that Galdieri disliked her popularity with the audience, but Totò treated her paternally, trying to protect her from distasteful behaviour.

During the war, in 1942 and 1943, she sang in Berlin and Nazi Germany. One of the locations was to entertain the SS guards of the Auschwitz concentration camp. The concert was in February 1943. Origoni said she refused to attend a meal, as the guest of honour, given by the Nazi propaganda minister Joseph Goebbels. The meal went ahead without her, with her chair remaining empty.

In 1947, her singing talents were confirmed when she was hired to sing the role of Flora in Giuseppe Verdi's opera La traviata. The performance was directed by Giorgio Strehler at the Teatro alla Scala in Milan.

On her 100th birthday in 2019, special celebrations were held in her birthplace. The mayor unveiled a plaque and there was a screening of the biopic "Lia: Music non-stop". The film was created by a fellow Sardinian who had spent time to digitally restore early recordings of Origoni's singing. Italian politician Paola Deiana arranged for a street in La Maddalena to be named in her honour noting how well known she had been from the 1940s and 1960s.

Origoni died on 26 October 2022, at the age of 103.
