= Reno and Smiley =

1960s American musical duo

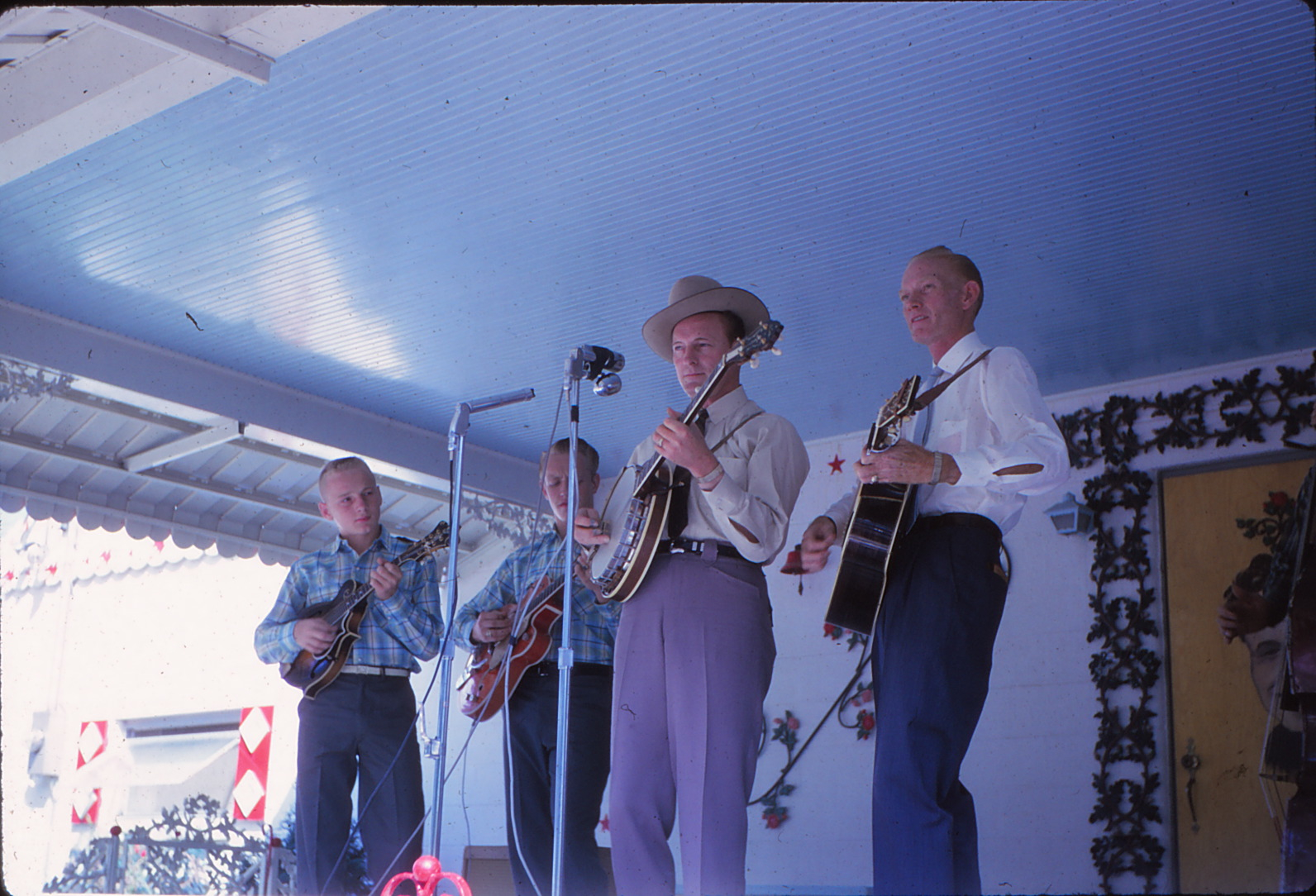
- Don Reno (banjo) and Red Smiley (acoustic guitar, right), 1962

Background information
- Also known as: Chick and His Hot Rods, Reno and Smiley and the Tennessee Cut-Ups
- Origin: Wheeling, West Virginia
- Genres: Bluegrass, country, gospel
- Years active: 1951–1964; 1965
- Labels: King, Dot, Copper Creek, Rural Rhythm
- Past members: Don Reno; Red Smiley

Reno and Smiley were an American musical duo that was composed of Don Reno (May 17, 1925 – October 16, 1984) and Red Smiley (February 21, 1925 – January 2, 1972). They were one of the most acclaimed duos in country and bluegrass music in the 1950s and early 1960s.

== Background ==
Arthur Lee Smiley, Red Smiley, was born in Marshall, NC. Little is known about his early life, but his musical inspiration is said to have surfaced at the age of seven when seeing two hobos playing in Bushnell, North Carolina. By the late 1930s, he was playing on WROL in Knoxville, Tennessee, with guitar being his primary instrument. In 1942, he joined the Army. After he was discharged, he attended diesel mechanic school in Nashville, Tennessee, where he first saw Don Reno playing on the Grand Ole Opry with Bill Monroe. At this time, he was also performing in East Tennessee and western North Carolina.

Donald Wesley Reno, Don Reno, was born in Spartanburg, SC, but made his home in Clyde, North Carolina. He was known as a showman, vocalist, multi-instrumentalist, songwriter, and composer, although his immediate family was not musical. He was exposed to fiddlers Art Wooten and Tommy Magness through the wife of his older brother Harley, in which she had brothers that had a band. He first picked up the banjo at the age of five and by age eight, he owned a guitar. Reno's musical approach was different than others in bluegrass at the time in that his was more innovative rather than traditional, injecting blues and jazz into his playing. As he wavered between guitar and banjo, he was a star on both. In March 1944, Reno joined the Army and served as company barber in Burma and China. After the war, he operated a grocery store in South Carolina and played jazz and country music at night. In 1948, he heard that Bill Monroe needed a banjo player after Earl Scruggs had left, so he drove to Taylorsville, North Carolina, where he got onstage without invitation and played banjo with Bill Monroe and the Blue Grass Boys. He stayed with them until 1949, when Reno left the Blue Grass Boys because of an occurrence of malaria and formed the first edition of the Tennessee Cut-Ups in South Carolina with his nephew, Verlon Reno.

== How they met ==
The two talents met in 1949 while working with fiddler Tommy Magness and the Tennessee Buddies in Roanoke, Virginia. Red Smiley was already an active member of the group when Don Reno was called to join them. Smiley also joined the group in 1949, playing at WDBJ radio. After hearing that Reno had left Bill Monroe and the Blue Grass Boys, Smiley convinced Magness to call and offer him a job. The first records that Red and Don recorded together were with Tommy Magness in 1951 for Federal Records, a subsidiary of King Records, recording four Reno-penned sacred songs, where they found that their playing worked well together.

== Their career together ==
After Tommy Magness retired, they both joined Toby Stroud's Blue Mountain Boys to play on a radio station, WWVA, in Wheeling, West Virginia. In 1952, Syd Nathan from King Records called and offered to record Reno and Smiley alone. The duo recorded "I'm Using My Bible for a Roadmap" in 1952, which was written by Don Reno in 1950. They went their separate ways, Smiley returning to Asheville to work as a mechanic, and Reno re-joining Arthur "Guitar Boogie" Smith and the Crackerjacks in Charlotte, North Carolina.

When a man from Richmond, Virginia wanted to produce a live show with Red and Don on Easter weekend of 1955, the two went to Richmond, along with John Palmer on bass and Mack Magaha on fiddle, and played together on stage for the first time. After playing the Old Dominion Barn Dance the day before, a radio show in Richmond, the group was offered a regular job at the Barn Dance. They accepted and Reno & Smiley and the Tennessee Cut-Ups were formed, recording their first session in August 1956 while releasing a single record every six weeks, with Carlton Haney as their manager.

The group was popular in the southeast and mid-Atlantic, when the duo started the first early morning country music TV show on December 31, 1956 in Roanoke, Virginia called Top o' the Morning, the show airing every weekday. The show was followed by a Saturday night radio barn dance and a weekly TV show. Due to a heavy TV schedule and the decline in Don Reno's health, their touring schedule was restricted. In November 1964, the group parted ways with Reno keeping the band name and adding his son, Ronnie Reno, on mandolin to work more road dates. The two reunited briefly in 1965 to play a college concert at Temple University in Philadelphia, Pennsylvania. After the split, though, Smiley continued to play on the TV shows as the "Bluegrass Cut-Ups" until Top o' the Morning was cancelled in 1968, which lead him into retirement. When Smiley retired in the late 1960s, Jim Eanes acquired the band, renaming it "The Shenandoah Cutups".

From late 1966 to early 1977, Don Reno traveled with Benny Martin. Red Smiley decided to come out of retirement to join the two and toured with them from 1969-1972. Red Smiley died in 1972 at the age of 47. Don Reno continued to perform with his sons Don Wayne and Dale along, with Bill Harrell, until his death in 1984 at the age of 57.

In 1992, Don Reno and Red Smiley were inducted into the International Bluegrass Music Hall of Honor.

== Discography ==
=== Singles ===
Year	Single	US Country	Label
1952	"I'm Using My Bible for a Roadmap"		King
1952	"There's Another Baby Waiting for Me Down the Line"		King
1952	"I Want to Live Like Christ, My Savior"		King
1952	"Maybe You Will Change Your Mind"		King
1952	"Lord's Last Supper"		King
1952	"I'm Gone, Long Gone"		King
1953	"Some Beautiful Day"		King
1953	"Pretty Wreath For Mother's Grave"		King
1953	"Choking the Strings"		King
1953	"He's Coming Back to Earth Again"		King
1953	"Tennessee Breakdown"		King
1954	"I Can Hear the Angels Singing"		King
1954	"Please Don't Feel Sorry for Me"		King
1954	"Tree of Life"		King
1954	"Tally-Ho"		King
1954	"Since I've Used My Bible for a Roadmap"		King
1954	"Your Tears Are Just Interest on the Loan"		King
1954	"I'm Building a Mansion in Heaven"		King
1955	"I'm The Biggest Liar in Town"		King
1955	"It's Grand to Have Someone to Love You"		King
1955	"Home Sweet Home"		King
1955	"How I Miss My Darling Mother"		King
1955	"Barefoot Nellie"		King
1955	"Trail of Sorrow"		King
1956	"Family Altar"		King
1956	"Limehouse Blues"		King
1956	"Old Home Place"		King
1956	"Jesus Answers My Prayers"		King
1956	"Cruel Love"		King
1956	"If It Takes Me a Lifetime"		King
1956	"Country Boy Rock 'n' Roll"		King
1957	"Kneel Down"		King
1957	"I Know You're Married"		King
1957	"Sawing on the Strings"		Dot
1957	"Never Get to Hold You in My Arms Any More"		King
1957	"No Longer a Sweetheart of Mine"		King
1957	"Where Did Our Young Years Go?"		Dot
1958	"Banjo Signal"		King
1958	"Howdy Neighbor Howdy"		Dot
1958	"Springtime in Dear Old Dixie"		King
1958	"Banjo Medley: Silver Bell, Snow Deer, Red Wing"		Dot
1958	"One Teardrop and One Step Away"		Dot
1959	"Wall Around Your Heart"		King
1959	"Keep Me Humble "		King
1959	"I Wouldn't Change You if I Could"		King
1959	"New Jerusalem"		King
1959	"Pretending"		King
1959	"Banjo Special"		King
1959	"Jesus Will Save Your Soul"		King
1959	"Lonesome Wind Blues"		King
1960	"Money, Marbles and Chalk"		King
1960	"Mountain Rosa Lee"		King
1960	"Dark As a Dungeon"		King
1960	"I'm Blue and I'm Lonesome"		King
1960	"Bringin' in the Georgia Mail"		King
1961	"Don't Let Your Sweet Love Die"	14	King
1961	"Love Oh Love, Oh Please Come Home"	23	King
1961	"Jimmy Caught the Dickens (Pushing Ernest in the Tub)"	27	King
1961	"Jesus Answers My Prayers"		King
1962	"When It's Time for the Whip-Poor-Will To Sing"		King
1962	"Ten Paces"		King
1962	"Don't Let Temptation Turn You 'round"		King
1963	"It's a Sin"		King
1963	"Just About Then"		King
1963	"I'm Jealous of You"		King
1963	"Christmas Reunion"		King
1964	"Things Are Gonna Be Different"		King
1964	"Black and White Rag"		King
1964	"I Don't Blame You"		King
1964	"Amazing Grace"		King
1964	"I Can See That You're Living a Lie"		King
1965	"Forever"		King
1965	"River of Jordan"		King
1965	"Just a Country Banjo"		King
1965	"Lonely Road When You're All Alone"		King
1965	"Little Mountain Road"		King
1966	"Unwanted Love"		King
1966	"I Want to Know"		King
1967	"Sundown and Sorrow"		King

=== Albums ===
Year	Album	Label
1957	Sacred Songs	King
1957	Instrumentals	King
1958	Folk Ballads & Instrumentals	King
1959	Someone Will Love Me in Heaven	King
1959	Good Old Country Ballads	King
1959	Variety of Country Songs	King
1959	Sacred Songs [vol. 2]	King
1960	Hymns and Sacred Gospel Songs	King
1960	Country Songs	King
1961	Wanted: For More Fine Country Music	King
1961	Folk Songs of the Civil War	King
1962	Country Singing and Instrumentals	King
1962	Banjo Special: 12 Songs	King
1962	Rose Maddox Sings Bluegrass	Capitol
1963	Another Day with Reno & Smiley	King
1963	Don Reno and Red Smiley	King
1963	The World's 15 Greatest Hymns	King
1963	World's Best 5-String Banjo	King
1963	Hootenanny	King
1963	Bluegrass Hits	Dot
1964	The True Meaning of Christmas	King
1964	On the Road	King
1964	Bluegrass Tribute to Cowboy Copas	King
1965	Variety Show	King
1968	Emotions	Nashville
1969	I Know You're Married	King
1970	The Best of Reno and Smiley	King
1971	Fiddling Buck Ryan with Don Reno & Red Smiley	Rural Rhythm
1972	Profile	Wango
1972	Together Again	Rome
1973	Last Time Together	Starday
1976	Songs for My Many	Grassound
1989	A Day In The Country	Copper Creek
2010	Bluegrass 1963	Rural Rhythm

== See also ==
- Don Reno
- Arthur Lee "Red" Smiley
