= The Morris Brothers =

American country music group

- Origin: Old Fort, North Carolina, United States
- Genres: Old time, Country
- Years active: 1930s–1940s
- Labels: Bluebird, RCA Victor
- Past members: Zeke Morris; Wiley Morris; George Morris

The Morris Brothers (Zeke Morris; May 9, 1916 – August 21, 1999 and Wiley Morris; February 1, 1919 – September 22, 1990) were an American country music group particularly popular in the 1930s, although they continued to play together occasionally until the 1970s.

== Biography ==
The Morris Brothers were born in Old Fort, North Carolina. Originally, they began performing as a trio together with a third brother, George Morris. In 1933, Zeke moved to Concord and joined J. E. Mainer's Crazy Mountaineers He made his first recordings with the Mountaineers in August 1935 för Bluebird Records. Four years later, in 1937, Wiley and Zeke along with banjo player Wade Mainer did some radio work in the North Carolina towns of Asheville and Raleigh. In April 1938, The Morris Brothers, fiddler Homer Sherrill and banjo player Joel Martin, calling themselves the Smilin' Rangers, performed at radio station WBTM in Danville, Virginia. In September 1938, Zeke recorded with Charlie Monroe as a replacement for Bill Monroe just after the Monroe Brothers had disbanded. The same year, Zeke's musical career came to a halt when he went to work in a cotton mill in Gastonia. In 1939, the brothers moved to Asheville and WWNC radio, where they resumed their career. After World War II they retired and opened an auto repair business. Between 1938 and 1939, the Morris Brothers made 36 recordings for RCA Victor.

Well known musicians who have played with the Morris Brothers include: Carroll Best, Hoke Jenkins, Red Rector, Red Smiley, Don Reno, Benny Sims and Earl Scruggs.
