= Benny Sims =

American country musician (1924–1995)

- Born: 1924; Sevier County, Tennessee
- Died: December 23, 1995 (aged 70–71) Johnson City, Tennessee
- Genres: Bluegrass, country

Benny Sims (1924 - December 23, 1995) was a bluegrass and country musician who played with Flatt and Scruggs, Roy Acuff and Bill Monroe.

== Early years ==
Benny Sims was born in Sevier County, Tennessee in 1924. His father and uncle were musicians. Beginning at six years old, Sims played throughout his school years.

== Career ==
In his junior year of high school, he was drafted by the U.S. Army Air Corps, and assigned to aid in the sale of war bonds. Following that, he was sent to Italy to perform on a radio program that was broadcast to the Allied and U.S. Forces.

After leaving the military, Benny played with The Morris Brothers, Wiley and Zeke, through which he met Earl Scruggs, a previous bandmate of the brothers. Scruggs had recently formed a band with Lester Flatt, and when they found themselves in need of a fiddler in 1949, they invited Sims to join the group.

After joining Flatt and Scruggs, Sims played on over 25 recordings in 1949 and 1950, including "Little Girl in Tennessee", "It's Too Late Now", "Salty Dog Blues", "Foggy Mountain Breakdown", "Pike County Breakdown" and "Roll in My Sweet Baby's Arms." Sims sung lead vocals on "Old Salty Dog Blues," possibly because Flatt and Scruggs had a last-minute recording session with Mercury Records, and the band was looking for material. Benny had played with the Morris Brothers, who frequently performed the song during their show.

When Flatt and Scruggs changed their label, Sims recorded just six more tunes before leaving the band, including "We Can't Be Darlings Anymore," "I'll Stay Around," and "Head Over Heels In Love With You." After leaving, Sims ventured to Knoxville, Tennessee where he became a staff musician on the WNOX Mid-Day Merry-Go-Round (a popular country-radio program) and another program called The Tennessee Barn Dance that aired each Saturday night. During this his time at WNOX, Sims worked with many artists including Carl Story and Charlie Monroe.

After three years in Knoxville, Sims moved to Johnson City, Tennessee to work at WJHL-TV where he appeared on the morning show, "Hi Neighbor." The show aired only three times per week, so in Benny's extra time he performed around East Tennessee with acts like Roy Acuff and Bill Monroe.

== Retirement ==
Excluding a short tour with Jim & Jesse McReynolds, Sims spent the remainder of his life in Johnson City, where he fully retired from professional entertainment and traveling in the early 1960s. Following his retirement, Sims was still musically active in his church services and gave some fiddle lessons, yet had no desire to return to the traveling life of a professional musician. He lived out the rest of his days happily with his wife, Eula, until he died on December 23, 1995.

Just two months before his death, Sims was honored by the Birthplace of Country Music Alliance's dedication of the Benny Sims Scholarship Fund, which is awarded yearly to students of East Tennessee State University's Bluegrass, Old-Time, & Country Music Studies Department. At this event which was held at the Paramount Theater in Bristol, Tennessee, many bluegrass superstars showed their support by performing that evening. Some of those artists include Jim & Jesse and the Virginia Boys, Ralph Stanley and The Clinch Mountain Boys, John Hartford, as well as students from ETSU's Bluegrass, Old-Time, and Country Music Studies.
