= Raymond Fairchild =

American musician (1939–2019)

Raymond Fairchild (March 15, 1939 – October 13, 2019) was an American banjo player from North Carolina in the Great Smoky Mountains. He was widely known for his fast playing, his fancy and intricate picking, and his ability to mimic the sounds of both animals and humans.

== Biography ==
Fairchild was born in Cherokee, Swain County, North Carolina. He learned music from an early age from his mother's side of the family. His more formal musical influences included Earl Scruggs and Don Reno.

When he was young, he played for tips at a tourist stop in Maggie Valley. The owner of the tourist stop, Ted Sutton, taught young Fairchild about show business. When Fairchild wasn't performing, he worked as a stonemason. In the mid-1960s, he formed the Frosty Mountain Boys but soon changed the name to the Maggie Valley Boys.

In 1963, Fairchild was signed by Uncle Jim O'Neal to record for the Rural Rhythm label. In the early 1970s, he successfully performed at the Grand Ole Opry, in a show broadcast at WSM in Nashville, Tennessee. In 1975, he met the Crowe Brothers, Wallace and Wayne, and together they formed a trio. The bluegrass trio lasted until 1991, when Fairchild formed the New Maggie Valley Boys with his son Zane Fairchild.

Fairchild won five awards as a champion banjo player and scored two gold records. He sold his own line of banjos, the Cox/Fairchild banjo. Since he was reluctant to leave his home district, he performed mostly at the Maggie Valley Opry House.

Fairchild died of a heart attack on October 13, 2019, aged 80.

== Discography ==
=== LPs ===
- America's Most Authentic Folk Banjo (Sims LP 115) (1961)
- King of the Smokey Mountain 5-String Banjo Players, Rural Rhythm RR-146 (1963)
- Mama Likes Bluegrass Music, Rural Rhythm RRFM 159 (1967)*
- Raymond Fairchild & the Maggie Valley Boys, Rural Rhythm RRMVB 170 (1967)*
- Honky Tonkin' Country Blues, Rural Rhythm RRRF 245 (1971)
- King of the Smokey Mountain Banjo Players, Rural Rhythm RRRF 254 (1972 - Re-issue of RR-146 from 1963, with Drums, electric guitar, and electric bass overdubbed onto the original Mono recordings to create a Stereo effect)*
- King of the Smokey Mountain 5-String Banjo Players, Rural Rhythm RRRF 256 (1972 - Re-issue of RRMVB 170 from 1967, with Drums, Electric Guitar, and Electric bass overdubbed onto the original Mono recordings to create a Stereo effect )
- King of the 5-String Banjo, Rural Rhythm RRRF 260 (1976)*
- King of the 5-String Banjo, Rural Rhythm RRRF 261 (1976)
- King of the 5-String Banjo, Rural Rhythm RRRF 262 (1976)
- King of the 5-String Banjo, Rural Rhythm RRRF 263 (1976)*
- Legendary Raymond Fairchild, Skyline SRO 003 (1981)
- Plays Requests, Skyline SRO 012 (1985)
- World Champion Banjo, Skyline SRO 016 (1987)

An Asterisk (*) denotes LPs which have been reissued on Compact Discs (See Below).

=== CDs ===
- Mama Likes Bluegrass Music, Rural Rhythm RHY 159*
- Raymond Fairchild & The Maggie Valley Boys, Rural Rhythm RUR-170*
- 31 Banjo Favorites, Rural Rhythm RHY 254*
- 16 All-Time Favorites, Rural Rhythm RHY 260*
- 15 Gospel Favorites, Rural Rhythm RHY 263*
- 31 Banjo Favorites Vol 2, Rural Rhythm RHY 270
- Smoky Mountain Christmas, Rural Rhythm RHY 290
- The Bluegrass Banjo Collection, Rural Rhythm RHY 294
- 31 Banjo Favorites (The New Collection), Rural Rhythm RHY 324
- Little Zane, Copper Creek Records CCCD 0156

An Asterisk (*) denotes CDs which are reissues of the original LPs (See Above)
