= Jim Eanes =

American singer-songwriter (1923–1995)

- Born: Homer Robert Eanes Jr. December 6, 1923; Mountain Valley, Virginia, US
- Died: November 21, 1995 (aged 71)
- Genres: Bluegrass, country
- Occupations: Musician, songwriter
- Instruments: Vocals, guitar
- Labels: Capitol, Decca, Starday, Rural Rhythm, Webco

Jim Eanes (December 6, 1923 – November 21, 1995) was an American bluegrass and country music singer and guitarist.

== Biography ==
Homer Robert Eanes Jr. was born in Mountain Valley, Virginia and grew up in Martinsville.

Eanes learned to play the guitar at an early age despite an injury to his left hand. He had his first musical training as a rhythm guitarist in his father's string band. In 1940, he joined "Roy Hall's Blue Ridge Entertainers" performing at a radio station in Roanoke, Virginia until 1943 when Roy Hall died. In the mid-1940s, Eanes joined "Uncle Joe and the Blue Mountain Boys". He also performed with Flatt & Scruggs, and in 1948, with Bill Monroe's Bluegrass Boys.

In 1949, he made his solo recording debut on the Capitol label together with Homer Sherrill on fiddle and Snuffy Jenkins on banjo. Two years later, in 1951, Eanes formed "The Shenandoah Valley Boys" recording for both the Blue Ridge and Rich-R-Tone label. The Shenandoah Valley Boys performed at radio station "WWVA Wheeling Jamboree". After receiving a recording contract on Decca Records, on the proposal of the A & R man, he changed his musical style from bluegrass to country music. He remained on Decca until 1955, when he began recording for Starday Records renaming his band: "Smilin' Jim and His Boys". His band by now consisted of Roy Russell on fiddle, Allen Shelton on banjo, and Arnold Terry on bass. One of his most popular songs, "Your Old Standby", became his signature song. Another heart touching gospel song he wrote "Not Afraid" was widely recorded by many well known artists.

Eanes worked as a deejay in the 1960s for several radio stations. In the late 1960s, he worked with "Red Smiley and the Bluegrass Cut-Ups" and when Smiley retired, Eanes took over the band calling it "The Shenandoah Cutups". They released a few albums and disbanded shortly after 1970. Eanes began an extensive tour visiting bluegrass festivals in both the United States and Western Europe during the 1970s and early 1980s. He even recorded an album in Belgium with the local band: the "Smoketown Strut". He had a heart attack in 1978.

He died on November 21, 1995, of congestive heart failure.

== Selected discography ==
- Bluegrass Ballads – Rebel 1643 (1986)
- Reminiscing – Rebel 1653 (1987)
- Let Him Lead You – Rebel 1673 (1989)
- 5oth Anniversary – Rebel 1683 (1990)
- Heart of the South (with Bobby Atkins) – Rural Rhythm RHY-1012(1991)

== Bibliography ==
- Vladimir Bogdanov, Chris Woodstra, Stephen Thomas Erlewine, All Music Guide to Country: The Definitive Guide to Country Music – 2003
- Kurt Wolff, Orla Duane, Country Music: The Rough Guide – 2000
