= Copper Creek Records =

American record label

- Founded: 1978
- Founder: Gary Reid
- Genre: Country, bluegrass, old-time
- Country of origin: U.S.
- Location: Roanoke, Virginia

Copper Creek Records is a record label based in Roanoke, Virginia specializing primarily in bluegrass and old-time music.

== History ==
Spurred by his interest in the music of the Stanley Brothers, Gary B. Reid launched Copper Creek in October 1978. Their first release was a 45 rpm single by the Johnson Mountain Boys. Side A was "When I Can Forget" and side B was "Johnson Mountain Hoedown."

Initially, Copper Creek's focus was on releasing albums by the Johnson Mountain Boys, but expanded into historic preservation, annotation, and release of early bluegrass recordings and radio broadcasts.

Cooper Creek became a label for bluegrass and old-time music artists and listeners.

As sales of recorded music have decreased, Reid has focused primarily on writing and his one-man show "A Life of Sorrow, the Life and Times of Carter Stanley."

For his book The Music of the Stanley Brothers (University of Illinois Press), Reid was named Bluegrass Print/Media Person of the Year by the International Bluegrass Music Association (IBMA).

== Artists ==
Here is a partial list of artists who have released recordings on the Copper Creek label.

- E.C. and Orna Ball
- The Blue Sky Boys
- Bluegrass Cardinals
- Bluegrass Patriots
- Chris Brashear and Peter McLaughlin
- Gary Brewer
- Hylo Brown
- Albert E. Brumley Jr.
- The Carter Family
- The Country Gentlemen
- East Coast Bluegrass Band
- The Crooked Jades
- Crowe Brothers
- East Virginia
- Tony Ellis
- Raymond Fairchild
- Lester Flatt & Earl Scruggs & The Foggy Mountain Boys
- Alice Gerrard
- Tom T. Hall
- Ginny Hawker & Kay Justice
- Mike Henderson
- Trey Hensley & Drivin' Force
- Adam Hurt
- Randall Hylton
- Johnson Mountain Boys
- Carol Elizabeth Jones & Laurel Bliss
- Kathy Kallick
- Maro Kawabata
- Dick Kimmel
- James Leva
- Local Exchange
- The Louvin Brothers
- Claire Lynch
- McPeak Brothers
- The Mysterious Redbirds
- New Roanoke Jug Band
- Michelle Nixon
- Patent Pending
- Ken Perlam
- Tony Ramey
- James Reams & the Barnstormers
- John Reischman and the Jaybirds
- Reno and Smiley
- Curly Seckler
- George Shuffler
- Steve Sparkman
- Ron Spears
- Ralph Stanley
- The Stanley Brothers
- Jack Tottle
- Roland White Band
- Josh Williams & High Gear
- Wolfe Brothers

== See also ==
- List of record labels
