= Jesse McReynolds =

American bluegrass musician (1929–2023)

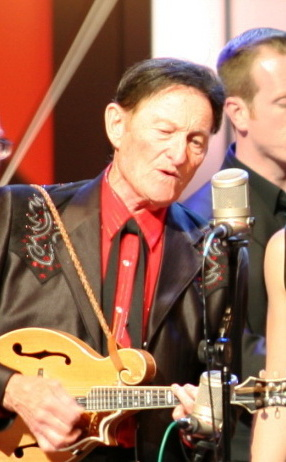
- McReynolds at the Grand Ole Opry in 2007

Background information
- Born: Jesse Lester McReynolds; July 9, 1929
- Origin: Coeburn, Virginia, U.S.
- Died: June 23, 2023 (aged 93) Gallatin, Tennessee, U.S.
- Genres: Bluegrass
- Instruments: Mandolin, fiddle, guitar, vocals
- Years active: 1945–2023
- Labels: Capitol, Columbia, Epic, Opryland, CMH, Rounder, Old Dominion, Rural Rhythm Records Rural Rhythm Records
- Website: www.jimandjesse.com

Jesse Lester McReynolds (July 9, 1929 – June 23, 2023) was an American bluegrass musician. He was best known for his innovative crosspicking and split-string styles of mandolin playing.

== Biography ==
McReynolds was born in Coeburn, Virginia. He and his brother Jim begin performing together in or around 1947. They originally performed under the name, "The McReynolds Brothers." In 1951, Jesse and Jim, joined by Larry Roll on guitar, made their first recording, ten gospel songs for Kentucky Records under the name "The Virginia Trio". In 1952, Jim and Jesse signed with Capitol Records, who asked them to change their name from the "McReynolds Brothers," so they started recording under the name "Jim and Jesse and the Virginia Boys." They recorded 20 songs for Capitol over three sessions in 1952, 1953, and 1955. During this time (1952-1954), Jesse also served in the US Army in Korea (they recorded sessions in 1953 while he was on leave). While serving in Korea, he and Charlie Louvin of the Louvin Brothers (who was also serving in Korea) formed a band called the "Dusty Roads Boys" and played regular concerts for other troops. After Jesse's return from Korea, Jim and Jesse continued to perform and release albums until Jim's death from cancer in 2002. McReynolds was married to his wife, Joy.

From 2002, Jesse continued to perform and record as a solo artist. McReynolds played between 60 and 70 shows each year. Jim and Jesse became members of the Grand Ole Opry in 1964; Jesse maintained the duo's Opry membership since Jim's death in 2002. He became the oldest standing Opry member in March 2020, following the death of fellow Opry member Jan Howard. In 2019, he celebrated his 55th anniversary as a member of the Opry. In January 2017 he appeared on the CMT network show Nashville as a blind singer who inspires the character Rayna Jaymes (played by Connie Britton). McReynolds died in Gallatin, Tennessee, on June 23, 2023, at the age of 93.

== Honors ==
- Member of the Grand Ole Opry since 1964
- Inducted into International Bluegrass Music Hall of Honor in 1993
- Awarded National Heritage Fellowship Award in 1997
- Bending the Rules nominated for "Best Instrumental Recording of the Year" from the International Bluegrass Music Association in 2005.

== Recordings ==
Year	Album(s)	Group	Notes
1951	The Virginia Trio 1951: Their Early Gospel Recordings (Old Dominion, 2000); Sacred Songs of The Virginia Trio (Ultrasonic)	The Virginia Trio or James and Jesse McReynolds with Larry Roll	Ten songs originally recorded as singles for the Kentucky label, later released as a single album by Ultrasonic and Old Dominion.
1952, 1954, 1955	20 Great Songs by Jim and Jesse (Capitol, 1968); First Sounds: The Capitol Years (2002); Jim and Jesse: 1952-1955 (Bear Family, 1992); Jim and Jesse: Best of the Early Years (Cleopatra, 2009)	Jim and Jesse	The duo recorded 20 songs for Capitol in three sessions. These songs have been released under various album names (not all albums listed include all 20 songs).
1958	Best of the Best: Legendary Bluegrass Duets (Federal, 2003)	Jim and Jesse	14 singles recorded for Starday and released on various compilations but not released together until 2003 (and even then, only 10 of the tracks appear on the album)
1960	Bluegrass Special/Bluegrass Classics (2-LP set - Epic, 1963)	Jim and Jesse and the Virginia Boys	
1962	Radio Shows (2-LP set - Old Dominion, 1979)	Jim and Jesse and the Virginia Boys	Recordings of several of Jim and Jesse's radio shows on WBAM (syndicated by Martha White)
1963	Country Music & Bluegrass at Newport (Vanguard, 1963)	Various artists	Live recording from 1963 Newport Folk Festival; four tracks from Jim and Jesse
unknown (1960–1964)	The Old Country Church (Epic, 1964)	Jim and Jesse and the Virginia Boys	
unknown (1960–1965)	Y'all Come! Bluegrass Humor with Jim & Jesse & the Virginia Boys (Epic, 1965)	Jim and Jesse and the Virginia Boys	Not to be confused with Y'all Come: The Essential Jim and Jesse, a greatest hits album released later
unknown (1960–1965)	Berry Pickin' In the Country (The Great Chuck Berry Songbook) (Epic, 1965)	Jim and Jesse and the Virginia Boys	A cover album of Chuck Berry songs
unknown (1960–1966)	Sing Unto Him a New Song (Epic, 1966)	Jim and Jesse and the Virginia Boys	
unknown (1960–1967)	Diesel on My Tail (Epic, 1967)	Jim and Jesse	
1968	The All-Time Great Country Instrumentals (Epic, 1968)	Jim and Jesse	
1968–1969	The Soft Parade (Elektra, 1969)	The Doors	Jesse plays mandolin on this Doors album
1969	Saluting the Louvin Brothers (Epic, 1969)	Jim and Jesse	
1969	We Like Trains (Epic, 1969)	Jim and Jesse	
1971	Freight Train (Capitol, 1971)	Jim and Jesse	
1972	The Jim & Jesse Show (Prize, 1972; Old Dominion 1972)	Jim and Jesse	
1972	Mandolin Workshop (Hilltop, 1972)	Jesse McReynolds	
1973	Superior Sounds of Bluegrass (Old Dominion, 1973)	Jim and Jesse and the Virginia Boys	
1973	Me and My Fiddles (Old Dominion, 1973)	Jesse McReynolds	
1973	Bean Blossom (MCA, 1973)	Various Artists	Live recording of the 7th Annual Bean Blossom Bluegrass Festival; includes five tracks from Jim and Jesse
1974	Jesus is the Key to the Kingdom (Old Dominion, 1975)	Jim and Jesse and the Virginia Boys	
1975	The Jim & Jesse Show - Live in Japan (2-LP set - Old Dominion, 1975)	Jim and Jesse	
1976	Songs About Our Country (Old Dominion, 1976)	Jim and Jesse	
1976	Allen Shelton - Shelton Special (Rounder, 1977)	Allen Shelton	Jesse plays backup for this solo album by Allen Shelton, long time banjo player in the Virginia Boys
1977	Palace of Songs (Old Dominion, 1977)	Jim and Jesse	
1979	Songs of Inspiration (Old Dominion, 1979)	Jim and Jesse and the Virginia Boys	
1981	Master of Bluegrass (MCA Records, 1981)	Bill Monroe	Jesse played on two of the tracks on this album, "Melissa's Waltz for J.B." and "Lady of the Blue Ridge"
1983	Homeland Harmony (Old Dominion, 1983)	Jim and Jesse	
1983	Tanyards: Bluegrass Fiddle (Blueberry BB145)	Jim Moss	Jesse was one of the backing musicians on this album from Jim Moss
1986	Somewhere My Love (Old Dominion, 1986)	Jesse McReynolds	This was a solo effort by Jesse playing both mandolin and lead guitar, with a backup band that did not include Jim
1990	The Masters (CMH Records, 1995)	The Masters	One of two albums released by the bluegrass super group The Masters (Josh Graves, Kenny Baker, Eddie Adcock, Jesse McReynolds) that toured together in the late 80s and early 90s
1990	Saturday Night Fish Fry (CMH Records, 1995)	The Masters	
1993	Honor the King of Country Music, Roy Acuff (Old Dominion, 1993)	Jim and Jesse	This album is sometimes referred to as "Tribute to Roy Acuff"
2001	Masters of the Mandolin	Bobby Osborne and Jesse McReynolds	
2007	Dixie Road	Jesse McReynolds	
2010	Songs of the Grateful Dead: A Tribute to Jerry Garcia and Robert Hunter	Jesse McReynolds and Friends	
2017	Portraits in Fiddles (Compass Records, 2017)	Mike Barnett	Jesse is featured on two tracks and a speaking intro where he shares the origins of his signature cross-picking mandolin style.
