= Allen Shelton =

American musician

Allen Shelton was an American five-string banjo player mostly known for being a member of the bluegrass band Jim & Jesse and the Virginia Boys since the 1960s. Shelton was born in Rockingham County, North Carolina, on July 2, 1936. Shelton started playing the banjo when he was fourteen. His father Troy Shelton was a guitar player mainly, but also played mandolin and banjo. A local musician named Junior Biggs showed him some three-finger style rolls.

== Career ==
Shelton played with a wide variety of people throughout several genres in his career. The most notable of them were Jim and Jesse, whom he spent most of his professional career with. He played with Mac Wiseman, and the Country Boys where Mac at the time was working for WRVA the Old Dominion Barn Dance in Richmond. Playing with Wiseman was Allen's first recording experience. Shelton got his first full-time job as a musician when he was sixteen playing with Jim Eanes; he was the banjo player on most of Eanes' Starday Records recordings. In the 1950s, Allen performed with Hack Johnson and the Tennesseans, and later, with Jim Eanes and Mac Wiseman. He joined Jim & Jesse and the Virginia Boys, and began recording for Columbia Records on December 7, 1960. In 1966, Jim & Jesse had an offer to record with the Nashville Symphony and Shelton left the band in protest. He retired from music and began working as a machinist and welder in Louisiana. About ten years later he found himself once more on the road with Jim & Jesse playing mostly five-string dobro, which is a combination of banjo and resophonic guitar, because they already had a banjo player named Mike Scott. Allen used the instrument to record a whole album called 5 String Dobro & Banjo where he played many of his influential instrumentals. When he went back to playing with Jim & Jesse, Mike Scott was playing banjo, so Shelton would play "Dojo" and on some songs he would play twin banjo with Mike Scott. He released his first solo album Shelton Special on Rounder Records in 1977. In total Allen recorded 89 songs with Jim & Jesse and became a part of their sound that is so iconic, and has influenced countless banjo players.

== Picking style and influences ==
Shelton's picking style was more experimental than other bluegrass banjo players. He enjoyed creating unusual sounds including adapting steel guitar licks into his solos. Jesse McReynolds is quoted as saying "When Allen Shelton played with us all those years, every time we heard a pedal steel guitar break, we'd try to adapt it to the banjo and to the mandolin, both we just experimented with different things.” His playing was described as "bouncy". Aside from his father, Troy Shelton and banjo player Hubert Davis, the two main influences Shelton quotes according to the book "Masters of the 5-String Banjo" were Earl Scruggs, and Don Reno; he said he loved the right hand of Scruggs, and the left hand of Reno. In an interview of Shelton with WSM Grand Ole Opry announcer Eddie Stubbs he said that early on in playing banjo he figured out he couldn't play like Reno or Scruggs, which caused him to create his own style which has become known as "Shelton Style" which is the bouncy, swing sound everyone talks about when talking about Shelton's playing. However, the feeling of reverence for style was shared mutually between Shelton and Reno. At the beginning of this same interview, Eddie Stubbs refers to a certain situation when Don Reno was asked the question; Besides himself and Earl Scruggs, who is the greatest banjo player? Don Reno answered simply with, "Allen Shelton!".

== The "Pedal Banjo" ==
Aside from his many inventions stylistically on the banjo, Shelton in his creativity came up with an idea to allow him to play even more on slower material, by conceiving and commissioning the building of a special tailpiece allowing him to emulate the sounds of a pedal steel guitar. With the first four strings on his banjo tuned to an open D tuning (D, F#, A, D, 4-1), he would use the "pedal attachment" to raise the 2nd and 3rd strings up to an open G chord (D, G, B, D 4-1), thus accomplishing the moving pitch sound of a pedal steel. In the words of Shelton, "...it made it so that anywhere you laid your finger across that banjo, it made it two chords...".

== Death ==
In 2009, Shelton was diagnosed with leukemia. Allen died on November 21, 2009, at Centennial Medical Center in Nashville, TN when he was 73, according to his daughter-in-law.

== Legacy ==
In 2018, Shelton was inducted in to the International Bluegrass Music Hall of Fame.

== Performed With ==
- Jim Eanes and the Shenandoah Valley Boys, 1952, 1956-1960
- Mac Wiseman and the Country Boys, 1953
- Hack Johnson and the Tennesseans, 1954-1955
- The Farm Hands, 1955-1956
- Jim & Jesse and the Virginia Boys, 1960-1966, 1983-1988
- Luke Thompson and the Green Valley Boys, 1968-1969
- The Dixie Revelers, 1969-1970

== Compositions ==
- “Banjo Bounce”
- “Bending The Strings”
- “Dine-e-o”
- “Shelton Special”

== Discography ==
Singles

- 1955 - Old Kentucky Home/Allen's Dream (Colonial)

Albums

- 1977 - Shelton Special (Rounder)
- 1977 - Allen Shelton with The Shenandoah Valley Boys - Mr. Original Banjo Man (Outlet)
- 1985 - 5 String Dobro & Banjo (Atteiram)

Appears On

- 1955 - Hack Johnson And His Tennesseans - Crazy Banjo Medley / Swanee River (Colonial)
- 1962 - Various - The Bluegrass Hall Of Fame - Let Me Whisper (Gusto, Starday)
- 1976 - Jim & Jesse And The Virginia Boys - Songs About Our Country (Old Dominion)
- 1977 - Jim & Jesse And The Virginia Boys - Palace Of Songs (Old Dominion)
- 1977 - Jim Eanes' Shenandoah Valley Quartet - Jim Eanes' Shenandoah Valley Quartet (Outlet)
- 1978 - Jim & Jesse And The Virginia Boys - Radio Shows (Old Dominion)
- 1978 - The Morgans - Music From Morgan Springs (Davis Unlimited)
- 1978 - Jim Eanes And The Shenandoah Valley Boys - The Early Days Of Blue Grass - Volume 4 (Rounder)
- 1980 - Jim & Jesse - The Jim & Jesse Story (CMH)
- 1980 - Jim & Jesse - Jim & Jesse Today! (CMH)
- 1983 - Jim Eanes - Shenandoah Grass, Yesterday And Today (Webco)
- 1984 - Kenny Baker - Highlights (Country)
- 1985 - Jim & Jesse - The Epic Bluegrass Hits (Rounder, Columbia)
- 1986 - Jim And Jesse - Some Old, Some New, Some Borrowed, Some True (MSR)
- 1986 - Glen Duncan - Town & Country Fiddler (Turquoise)
- 1987 - Jim & Jesse - In The Tradition (Rounder)
- 1987 - Various - Rounder Banjo (Rounder)
- 1988 - Glen Duncan - Sweetwater (Turquoise)
- 1989 - Kenny Baker & Blaine Sprouse - Indian Springs (Rounder)
- 1989 - Jim Eanes - Log Cabin In The Lane (Highland)
- 1990 - Various - Rounder Fiddle (Rounder)
- 1991 - Various - Bluegrass Class Of 1990 (A Rounder Records Sampler) (Rounder)
- 1991 - Jim & Jesse McReynolds - Music Among Friends (Rounder)
- 1997 Various - Mystery Train: Classic Railroad Songs, Volume 2 (Rounder)
- 1997 - Jim Eanes - Webco Classics Volume Three - Yesterday And Today (Pinecastle)
- 1998 - Jim & Jesse - Songs From The Homeplace (Pinecastle)
- 2002 - Various - True Bluegrass (Rounder)
- 2002 - Various - Bluegrass Mountain Style (Rounder)
- 2004 - Hazel Dickens - It's Hard To Tell The Singer From The Song (Rounder)
