= Flatt and Scruggs at Carnegie Hall! =

Live album by Flatt and Scruggs
- Released: 1963
- Recorded: December 8, 1962
- Genre: Country
- Label: Columbia

Flatt and Scruggs chronology
The Original Sound (1963)	Flatt and Scruggs at Carnegie Hall! (1963)	Recorded Live at Vanderbilt University (1964)

Flatt and Scruggs at Carnegie Hall! is a live album by bluegrass artists Flatt and Scruggs. It was recorded on December 8, 1962, at the first bluegrass concert ever performed at Carnegie Hall. It was released in 1963 by Columbia Records (catalog number CL 2045).

== Chart performance ==
The album became a crossover hit. It entered Billboard magazine's Top LP's chart in the issue dated September 28, 1963, peaking at No. 134 during a six-week run on the chart. The album debuted on the magazine's Top Country Albums chart on January 25, 1964, peaked at No. 7, and remained on the chart for a total of 16 weeks.

== Critical reception ==
Professional ratings
Review scores
Source	Rating
AllMusic	3/5 stars
Record Mirror	3/5 stars

In the contemporary Record Mirror review, it was said that "although the recording isn't as good as from a studio, there's more than enough atmosphere to make up for it," calling it "Good C & W, for the enthusiast." Retrospectively, AllMusic gave the album a rating of three stars, with reviewer Mark A. Humphrey calling it "a highly influential 'folk-boom' concert album".

== Track listing ==
Side A

1. "Salty Dog Blues" (W. Morris, Z. Morris) [1:57]
2. "Durham's Reel" (Stacey, Cirtin, Warren) [1:04]
3. "Hot Corn, Cold Corn" (Ackeman, Flatt) [2:21]
4. "Footprints In The Snow" (Carter) [2:37]
5. "Flint Hill Special" (Scruggs) [2:23]
6. "Dig A Hole In The Meadow" (Scruggs, Flatt) [2:00]

Side B

1. "I Wonder Where You Are Tonight" (Bond) [1:39]
2. "Mama Blues" (Scruggs) [1:25]
3. "Take This Hammer" (Ledbetter) [2:06]
4. "Fiddle And Banjo" (Stacey, Cirtin, Warren) [1:26]
5. "Yonder Stands Little Maggie" (Stacey, Cirtin) [1:48]
6. "Let The Church Roll On" (Stacey, Cirtin) [2:01]

== Charts ==
Chart peaks for Flatt and Scruggs at Carnegie Hall!
Chart (1963–1964)	Peak position
US Billboard Top LP's	134
US Billboard Top Country Albums	7

== Credits ==
The musicians performing on the album are:

- Lester Flatt - guitar, lead vocals
- Earl Scruggs - banjo, guitar, vocals
- "Cousin Jake" Tullock - bass guitar
- Buck Graves - dobro
- Paul Warren - fiddle
- Billy Powers - guitar
