= Snuffy Jenkins =

American old time banjo player

- Also known as: "Snuffy" Jenkins
- Born: DeWitt Jenkins; October 27, 1908; Harris, North Carolina, US
- Died: April 29, 1990 (aged 81)
- Genres: Bluegrass music, old time
- Occupation: Musician
- Instruments: fiddle, banjo, guitar
- Years active: 1927–1989
- Label: Rounder Records
- Formerly of: Smith Hammett; Rex Brooks; J. E. Mainer's Mountaineers; Byron Parker's Hillbillies; Jim Eanes; Homer Sherrill

DeWitt "Snuffy" Jenkins (October 27, 1908 – April 29, 1990) was an American old time banjo player and an early proponent of the three-finger banjo style.

== Biography ==
Jenkins was born in Harris, North Carolina, as the last of ten children. He began playing the fiddle as a plucked instrument, switched to guitar and later to a home-made banjo he and his brother Virl had built. He bought his first real banjo in 1927, and soon fell under the influence of Smith Hammett and Rex Brooks, two early banjo players who did much for the development of Jenkins' style. In 1934, he appeared on the radio show Crazy Water Barn Dance over WBT in Charlotte, North Carolina with his newly formed group, the Jenkins String Band. The string band comprised Snuffy Jenkins on banjo, his brother Verl Jenkins on fiddle and a cousin on guitar. During this time, Jenkins also played in the W.O.W. String Band.

In 1936, he joined J. E. Mainer's Mountaineers as banjo player performing at local radio station WSPA in Spartanburg. The next year, in 1937, the Mountaineers were hired to perform over WIS in Columbia. The announcer of radio station WIS was Byron "The Old Hired Hand" Parker and he almost immediately took over the Mountaineers renaming them Byron Parker's Hillbillies. The Hillbillies, consisting of J. E. Mainer on fiddle, Jenkins on banjo, George Morris and Leonard Stokes on guitars, later recorded – without Byron Parker – under the name of J. E. Mainer's Mountaineers. J. E. Mainer soon left, and was replaced by Verl Jenkins on fiddle and Clyde Robbins on guitar. Also, the String band that Jenkins formed had many of the characteristics of later groups like that of Bill Monroe. Jenkins shows his three-finger banjo style in its most natural form in these three pieces, "Spanish Fandango," "Twinkle, Twinkle, Little Star," and "Dixie/There's No Place Like Home." ^{[14]}

Snuffy Jenkins, "Cumberland Gap" from American Banjo Three-Finger and Scruggs Style (1990)
1956 recording of Snuffy Jenkins playing the 5 string banjo in three-finger style.

In 1939, Parker hired Homer Sherrill on fiddle; Mainer, Stokes and Morris had left earlier. Parker changed the group's name to The WIS Hillbillies and in 1947, Julian "Greasy" Medlin, a guitar player and a veteran of the medicine show circuit, along with the bass player Ira Dimmery were added to the Hillbillies. The WIS Hillbillies mainly did minstrel shows with comedy skits as Jenkins dressed up in baggy pants while "Greasy" wore blackface. It was around this time Byron Parker gave Jenkins his nickname "Snuffy" because he used to wipe his nose with his sleeve during one of the skits. Byron Parker died in 1948, and Jenkins and Sherrill, who had taken over the band, changed its name to The Hired Hands in Parker's memory.

In 1949, Sherrill and Jenkins recorded with Jim Eanes on two sides of a 78 rpm release for Capitol. In 1953, The Hired Hands appeared on television at WIS-TV and in 1955, they added guitarist Bill Rea. In 1956, folklorist Mike Seeger recorded Jenkins (accompanied by Ira Dimmery on guitar) for a Folkways sampler album of three-finger banjo styles. The Hired Hands first recorded as a group for Folk-Lyric in 1962. During the 1960s, they performed on several folk and bluegrass festivals.

When Jenkins was semi-retired in the 1960s he worked as a car salesman in South Carolina.

In 1979, the surviving members of The Hired Hands were invited to stage an old time medicine show in the hamlet of Bailey, North Carolina. The success of the show led the North Carolina Public Television to produce the "Free Show Tonight" which aired over PBS. The Hired Hands also performed their medicine show at the Smithsonian Institution and in 1983, at the American Place Theater in New York City.

== Legacy ==
Despite persistent rumours, Jenkins did not teach Earl Scruggs how to play the banjo, according to an interview with Jenkins, conducted by Tony Trischka on October 17, 1984. On the other hand, there is no doubt that Jenkins did indeed influence Don Reno with his picking and Scruggs does name Jenkins as a major influence. While Jenkins played a three finger banjo style similar to Scruggs in the North Carolina mountains he was an important influence on Earl Scruggs who is often referred to as the father of bluegrass banjo playing. Jenkins played a more archaic style than Scruggs and his followers and is closer to older string band banjo playing. ^{[14]}

A music festival, recently revived after a 20-year hiatus, in honor of Snuffy Jenkins is held annually in Rutherford County, NC (Snuffy's birthplace). The Snuffy Jenkins Festival features bluegrass and old-time music, and includes historical talks and discussions of Snuffy's life and music as well as related discussions about the contributions of other innovative banjo players from the region: Rex Brooks, Smith Hammett, and Earl Scruggs.

== Discography ==
Year	Title	Label	Number	Notes
1957	American Banjo Tunes and Songs in the 'Scruggs' Style	Folkways	FA 2314	remastered as Smithsonian Folkways SF40037 (1990) with previously unissued cuts added
1962	Carolina Bluegrass (with Pappy Sherrill)	Folk-Lyric	FL 123	also issued as Arhoolie 5011 in 1972
1971	33 Years of Pickin' and Pluckin	Rounder	005	with Pappy Sherrill
1976	Crazy Water Barn Dance	Rounder	0059	with Pappy Sherrill
1985	Byron Parker and His Mountaineers	Old Homestead	169	
1989	Something Special	Old Homestead	90193	with Pappy Sherrill
1998	Pioneer of the Bluegrass Banjo	Arhoolie	9027	reissue of Carolina Bluegrass

== Footnotes ==
14. Evans, David. 1973 p. 591
