= Michelle Nixon =

American singer-songwriter (born 1963)

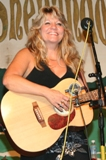
- Michelle Nixon

Background information
- Born: Michelle Denice Thurston; December 10, 1963 (age 62)
- Origin: Louisa, Virginia, United States; Goochland, Virginia, United States
- Genres: Folk, country, Americana, bluegrass
- Years active: 1989–present
- Labels: Copper Creek Records; Pinecastle; Blue Circle
- Website: michellenixon.com

Michelle Nixon is a bluegrass and acoustic country music artist. Born Michelle Denice Thurston on December 10, 1963 she grew up in central Virginia where she became involved in music at an early age. Nixon joined her first band at the age of 14, embarking on a musical journey that found her singing a variety of gospel and classic country music with different Virginia based bands. Gathering inspiration and style from, among others, Loretta Lynn and Emmylou Harris, Nixon quickly developed her own powerful sound.

== History ==
Michelle Nixon began her professional music career when she formed the band Slate River with her husband Nick in 1989. In 1990 and 1991, Nixon won the Virginia Folk Music Association's female vocalist award. Nixon teamed up with mandolin player / vocalist Vernon Hughes in the band "Appalachian Express" in 1993. In 1996, they joined to create the Virginia Band "Local Exchange" and released the album "Because He Lives" on Copper Creek Records.

After playing a key role in the Virginia Band "Local Exchange", Nixon formed her current band – Michelle Nixon & Drive – in 2002. Within a year, Nixon signed a three-album contract with Pinecastle Records. In the following years Nixon was consecutively nominated for Female Vocalist of the Year (Traditional) at the National SPBGMA (Society for the Preservation of Bluegrass in America) convention in Nashville, TN from 2004 to 2009. In 2006 she was the recipient of the Female Vocalist of the Year (Traditional) at the SPBGMA convention. In total "Michelle Nixon and Drive" received a total of six nominations at SPBGMA in 2006. Additionally from 2005 to 2009 Nixon was nominated for SPBGMA's Entertainer of the Year.

Nixon participated in the much acclaimed "Daughter's of Bluegrass" series of albums both with singing and her song writing abilities. On the 2006 release "Daughter's of Bluegrass – Back to the Well" Nixon co-wrote the song "Grass Angels" and performed on several of the cuts including a duet with fellow Bluegrass artist Jeanette Williams titled "How's it Feel", which was written by Dixie and Tom T. Hall.

Blue Circle Records continued the "Daughter's of Bluegrass Series" with the album "Daughter's of Bluegrass – Bluegrass Bouquet" in late 2008. Michelle Nixon again provided her vocal talents to this various artist project. For both of these projects Nixon was a recipient of the IBMA Recording Event of the Year Award in 2006 and 2009 respectively.

In 2007, Nixon toured as part of the "Blowin' the Dust Off" tour with Steve Bassett. During this same tour season, she played several bluegrass festivals that were not part of the Blowin' The Dust Off Tour including Sertoma Youth Ranch Spring Bluegrass Festival in Florida. Also in 2007 Nixon and her band Drive performed in Toronto, Ontario, Canada, as part of the Bluegrass Sundays Winter Concert Series.

In 2008, Nixon performed at the Induction ceremonies for the newest members of the Country Music Hall of Fame Tom T. Hall and the Statler Brothers at the request of veteran songwriter Hall. Her performance included his song "Harper Valley PTA", which she had recently recorded for her next album.

== Songwriting ==
Nixon has focused more and more on her songwriting. She wrote two to three songs on each of her Pinecastle albums. She also contributed as a songwriter to the IBMA-winning Daughter's of Bluegrass Album Back to The Well and co-wrote the song "When It's Christmas in Virginia" with her husband Nick Nixon for the A Pinecastle Christmas Gathering album. In more recent years Nixon's songs have been performed and recorded by other Bluegrass artist such as Dianne McKoy.

== Style ==
Nixon's overall style would be called Contemporary Bluegrass or Acoustic Country. She has a wide range of vocal and instrumental abilities and often performs both smooth ballads and hard driving bluegrass. She is known for performing classic country anthems and remaking them in her own style. In her performances and recording projects, she has shown her ability to shine as a solo vocalist as well as an outstanding ability to sing harmony that she learned as a girl singing gospel music. She performed and/or recorded projects with many bluegrass artist such as Jeanette Williams and Dale Ann Bradley as well as Country music performer and Grand Ole Opry star Bill Anderson.

== Personal life ==
Nixon is married to Nick Nixon and she has three children – Tia, Chip and Trace. She balances a busy musical career and family life while still finding time for the great outdoors. She loves to spend her "spare" time gardening, fishing and camping. Her husband Nick is an acoustic country artist who collaborates with Nixon. He has most recently been listed as a band member in "Drive".

In 2005 Nixon postponed her California tour due to an illness in the family. Her daughter was undergoing her fourth heart surgery. Due to her own personal experiences, Nixon has often worked with charity organizations such as the American Heart Association and the Shriners. For the past several years she has been the host for the Bluegrass in the Blue Ridge Bluegrass Festival in Luray, VA, which is a fundraiser for the Shriners Hospitals for Children.

== Discography ==
- Local Exchange – Because He Lives – Copper Creek Records 2001
- Michelle Nixon and Drive – It's My Turn – Pinecastle 2003
- Michelle Nixon and Drive – By Request – Pinecastle 2004
- Various Artists – A Pinecastle Christmas Gatherin' – Pinecastle 2004
- Michelle Nixon and Drive – What More Should I Say – Pinecastle 2005
- Daughter's of Bluegrass (Various Artists) – Back to the Well – Blue Circle Records 2006
- Daughter's of Bluegrass (Various Artists) – Bluegrass Bouquet – Blue Circle Records 2008
- Michelle Nixon and Drive – A Place I Belong – Mountain Fever Records 2011

== See also ==
- Bluegrass music
- International Bluegrass Music Association
- Bill Anderson (singer)
- Tom T. Hall
