= Tommy Hunter (fiddler) =

American fiddler (1919–1993)

- Born: 18 September 1919
- Origin: Mars Hill, North Carolina
- Died: 20 August 1993 (aged 73)
- Instrument: fiddle

Tommy Hunter (18 September 1919 – 20 August 1993) was an American fiddler from Mars Hill, North Carolina.

== Life ==
Hunter started playing the fiddle when he was seven years old. He was brother to violinist, Nan Fisher. At age twelve he played with his father's band on a radio station in Asheville, North Carolina. Hunter was a 1989 North Carolina Folk Heritage recipient. He recorded several albums; the final one was recorded in 1993 with The Carroll Best Band. Hunter was no longer able to play due to illness, but a selection of his previous recordings was mixed with the band in the studio. Hunter died on August 20, 1993, two days after previewing the album's final mix.

John McCutcheon lists Hunter as a source for several tunes he has recorded. McCutcheon recorded Hunter's tune "Laurel Branch" on his album Barefoot Boy With Boots On. McCutcheon also cites Hunter as a source for several tunes on The Wind That Shakes The Barley.

== Discography ==
- Deep In Tradition (1976)
- Say Old Man... Can You Play The Fiddle? (1992)
- The Carroll Best Band With Tommy Hunter (1993)
