= The Blue Sky Boys =

American country music duo

- Origin: Hickory, North Carolina
- Genres: Country
- Years active: 1935–1975
- Past members: Bill Bolick; Earl Bolick

The Blue Sky Boys were an American country music duo consisting of the brothers Earl (November 16, 1919 – April 19, 1998) and Bill Bolick (October 28, 1917 – March 13, 2008), whose careers spanned over 40 years.

== Biography ==
The brothers were born and raised in West Hickory, North Carolina, as the fourth and fifth siblings in a family of six children. Their parents, who were deeply religious and belonged to the First Church of God, taught them to sing hymns and gospel music. A neighbor taught Bill how to play guitar and banjo while Earl learned to play mandolin and guitar. Eventually, they decided to switch instruments, and Bill chose the mandolin, while Earl concentrated on the guitar. They made their radio debut in 1935 at local radio station WWNC in Asheville, North Carolina, as part of the Crazy Hickory Nuts. Sponsored by the J. F. Goodson Coffee Company and together with Homer Sherrill of the Crazy Hickory Nuts, they formed the Good Coffee Boys in the late 1935. Six months later, in June 1936, the Bolick brothers moved to Atlanta, Georgia, to perform at radio station WGST. Because they were sponsored by the Crazy Water Crystal, they had to perform using the name (Crazy) Blue Ridge Hillbillies.

In Atlanta, the Bolick brothers went to RCA Records for an audition. At first, Eli Oberstein, the artists and repertoire man, was reluctant to hear the brothers sing, believing them to be copying the Monroe Brothers. He changed his mind when he heard them sing, and immediately signed them to a recording contract. A discussion arose concerning what they should call themselves. Since they could not use the previous name the Blue Ridge Hillbillies - it had been taken by Homer Sherrill when the brothers left WGST - they decided to use Blue Sky Boys as their name. Their choice of name came from the nickname of western North Carolina: Land of the Blue Sky.

They made their first recordings in Charlotte, North Carolina, on June 16, 1936. Their first record, "Sunny Side of Life", coupled with "Where the Soul Never Dies", became an instant success. It sold so fast, the brothers were dubbed the New Hillbilly Kings. Between 1937 and 1941, the group recorded about 100 songs for RCA to considerable success on the hillbilly music circuit. Between 1941 and 1946, both brothers served in the military; after their discharges, they returned to Atlanta and resumed recording with RCA. Some of their sides featured fiddle playing from Leslie Keith, Sam "Curly" Parker, Joe Tyson, and Richard Hicks. They enjoyed a number of hits just after the war, but disliked the burgeoning honky-tonk style and refused to record it. When RCA asked them to play with an electric guitar, they refused and stopped recording until 1949. Due to personal issues, the Blue Sky Boys retired in 1951.

Bill became a postal clerk in his birth state and Earl took a job at Lockheed Aircraft in Atlanta. When Starday Records released an LP of their radio recordings in 1962, they decided to reunite and record again. Two LPs of new material followed, one secular (Together Again) and one religious (Precious Moments). They occasionally played live at folk festivals, and during a trip to California to perform at the UCLA Folk Festival, the brothers spent two days in the studio recording an album for Capitol Records. By the end of the 1960s, though, they had decided to call it quits again.

Once more, in 1975, they were convinced to record, this time for Rounder Records, and another round of folk- and bluegrass-circuit touring ensued. Following this, Bill moved back to Longview, North Carolina, while Earl retired to Tucker, Georgia.

In the 1990s, Copper Creek Records issued a series of four albums with live radio transcriptions from the 1940s.

== Discography ==
- Together Again, 1963 (Starday)
- Precious Moments, 1964 (Starday)
- The Original and Great: Early Authentic Country Recordings, 1964 (RCA Camden)
- Presenting the Blue Sky Boys, 1966 (Capitol)
- Sunny Side of Life, 1973 (Rounder)
- The Blue Sky Boys, 1976 (Rounder)
- The Blue Sky Boys (2 record set), 1976 (Bluebird)
- In Concert 1964, 1989 (Rounder)
- On Radio Vol. 1 - 4 (4 volumes), 1993 (Copper Creek)
- Farm & Fun Time Favorites Vol. 1 - 2 (2 volumes), 1996 (Copper Creek)
- A Treasury of Rare Song Gems From The Past (Compilation CD), 2007 (Gusto)
- The Blue Sky Boys: The Very Best of Classic Country Remastered (5-CD box set), 2007 (JSP Records JSP7782)
