= Carroll Best =

American bluegrass banjo player and music educator (c. 1931-1995)

Carroll Best, born Hugh Carroll Best, Jr., (February 6, 1931 – May 8, 1995) was an American bluegrass banjo player and music educator. He was briefly a member of The Morris Brothers in the mid 1950s. He was the winner of several regional banjo contests before being awarded the widely recognized Bascom Lamar Lunsford Award in 1990. He is credited for developing an influential melodic three-finger banjo style, which he taught as a member of the faculty at the Tennessee Banjo Institute. This style influenced the work of musicians Tony Trischka and Bela Fleck. His work was featured on radio broadcasts for NPR and The Grand Ole Opry, and on the television program Hee Haw. He released two albums while he was alive, and a third album of his work was released posthumously in 2001. He is listed as a historic artist by the Blue Ridge National Heritage Area, and was given the North Carolina Heritage Award in 1994.

== Life and career ==
Born in Crabtree, North Carolina on February 6, 1931, Hugh Carroll Best, Jr. was the son of Hugh Carroll Best, Sr. and Bertie Davis Best. His family was highly musical. His great-grandmother, grandmother, and mother all played the banjo using a "clawhammer" style, and his father played the instrument using a three- or four-finger picking style. One of his uncles was a guitar player and another a fiddler. Best began playing the banjo when he was five years old in 1936. His first public performance was in 1941 when he accompanied square dancing at Maggie Elementary School in Maggie Valley, North Carolina. He continued to accompany local public dances through his youth, developing his own unique picking style that enabled him to play melodic lines traditionally reserved for lead fiddle players.

From 1950 through 1954, Best served in the United States Navy. His father died of cancer on Christmas Day of 1955. He soon after became a regular performer at the Mountain Dance and Folk Festival in Asheville, North Carolina; exposure which led to an invitation by Zeke Morris and Wiley Morris to join their group The Morris Brothers. He accepted the offer and performed with the group in live concerts, radio, on television, and on record over a short period of just two months. He left the group shortly before he married Louise Presnell in June 1956. He was recorded by celebrated ethnomusicologist Joseph Sargent Hall in 1956 and 1959.

From 1965 through 1990, he worked for Dayco. He expressed gratitude and loyalty to the company for allowing him flexibility in hours to pursue musical interests outside of work; even after an accident which almost caused the loss of some of his fingers. He won several regional banjo competitions; including those at folk festivals of Union Grove, Fiddlers Grove, the Asheville Folk Festival, and the Folk Festival of the Smokies. He played with the Horn-pipers band in the 1970s, which was later renamed the Carroll Best Band. Other musicians in the band included banjo player Zack Allen, fiddler Mack Snoderly, and guitarist Danny Johnson. With this ensemble, Best recorded his first album, Pure Mountain Melodys, with the Asheville-based Skyline Records. In 1993 the band recorded a second album with Best's longtime friend, fiddler Tommy Hunter, with the Western North Carolina–based label, Ivy Creek Recordings, entitled The Carroll Best Band with Tommy Hunter.

In 1990, Best achieved wider recognition when he was awarded the Bascom Lamar Lunsford Award. That same year he joined the faculty of the Tennessee Banjo Institute. The wider exposure of these two events led to radio performances for the Grand Ole Opry and Folk Masters: Great Performances Recorded Live At The Barns Of Wolf Trap for NPR, and television appearances on Hee Haw. In 1994 he was the recipient of the North Carolina Heritage Award.

Best was murdered by his brother Sam Best on May 8, 1995. A 2001 posthumous album was released entitled Say Old Man, Can You Play the Banjo? Of all his recordings, this album best demonstrates Best's skills and unique technique. In 2014 a second posthumous album was released entitled Carroll Best and the White Oak String Band. The album was compiled by musicologist Ted Olson, professor of Appalachian studies at East Tennessee State University, and includes the 1950s recordings made by Joseph Sargent Hall which were previously overlooked inside the collection at the Library of Congress.

== Discography ==
- Pure Mountain Melodys (Skyline Records SR-008, 1982)
- The Carroll Best Band With Tommy Hunter (Ivy Creek Recordings ICR-250, 1993)
- Say Old Man, Can You Play The Banjo? (Copper Creek Records CCCD-0175, 1999)
