= Jack Tottle =

American bluegrass musician

John Walter Tottle, known as Jack Tottle (born November 24, 1939), is an American bluegrass musician, singer, mandolin player, songwriter, music teacher and author.

== Early life and education ==
Jack Tottle was on born November 24, 1939, in Baltimore, Maryland. He was educated at Dartmouth College in Hanover, New Hampshire.

== Career ==
In the early 1960s, he formed the Lonesome River Boys. The group released two albums: "Raise A Ruckus" in 1961 on Riverside Records and "Bluegrass Hootenanny" on the small and obscure Battle label. In the early 1970s, he joined Don Stover and the White Oak Mountain Boys and about this time, he also settled in Boston. In 1975, his book "Bluegrass Mandolin" was published by Oak Publications. The following year, he recorded a solo album "Back Road Mandolin" on Rounder Records. In 1976, he formed Tasty Licks, a progressive bluegrass group. One of the members of the group was an aspiring young banjo player, Bela Fleck. Tasty Licks released two albums ("Tasty Licks" and "Anchored to the Shore") on Rounder before being dissolved in July 1979. In 1999 Tottle released (on Copper Creek) "The Bluegrass Sound," 16 of his original compositions played by him and 13 other bluegrass luminaries.

Tottle is also the founder (in 1982) and former director (now retired) of the Bluegrass, Oldtime and Country Music Program at East Tennessee State University in Johnson City, Tennessee.
