= Recorded Live at Vanderbilt University =

Live album by Flatt and Scruggs
- Released: 1964
- Genre: Country
- Label: Columbia

Flatt and Scruggs chronology
Flatt and Scruggs at Carnegie Hall! (1963)	Recorded Live at Vanderbilt University (1964)	The Fabulous Sound of Lester Flatt & Earl Scruggs (1964)

Recorded Live at Vanderbilt University is a live album by bluegrass artists Flatt and Scruggs. It was released in 1964 by Columbia Records (catalog numbers CL 2134 [mono] and CS 8934 [stereo]).

The album debuted on Billboard magazine's Top Country Albums chart on April 4, 1964, peaked at No. 10, and remained on the chart for a total of 23 weeks.

AllMusic gave the album a rating of three stars. Critic Bruce Eder wrote: "[R]ecording a live album at Vanderbilt was Flatt & Scruggs' way of announcing that bluegrass had arrived academically, and then some. . . . The crowd is sympathetic, the acoustics are fine, and this record is worth tracking down."

== Track listing ==
Side A

1. "Lost All My Money" (Flatt, Scruggs) [1:54]
2. "Maggie Blues" (Graves, Flatt, Scruggs) [1:51]
3. "Steamboat Whistle Blues" (Roberts) [2:31]
4. "Paul and Silas" (Flatt, Scruggs) [2:11]
5. "Cannonball Blues" (Carter) [1:52]
6. "You Are My Flower" (Carter) [2:47]

Side B

1. "Old Leather Britches" (Warren, Flatt, Scruggs) [1:38]
2. "Across the Blue Ridge Mountains" (Cirtain, Stanley) [2:28]
3. "Old Folks" (Scruggs) [2:13]
4. "Going Back to Harlan" (Cirtain, Stacey) [1:22]
5. "Poor Rebel Soldier" (Cirtain, Stacey, Sky) [2:09]
6. "No Hiding Place Down Here" (Cirtain, Stacey) [2:30]
7. "Going Up Cripple Creek" (Flatt, Scruggs) [1:58]
