= Kathy Kallick =

American musician, guitar player, songwriter (born 1952)

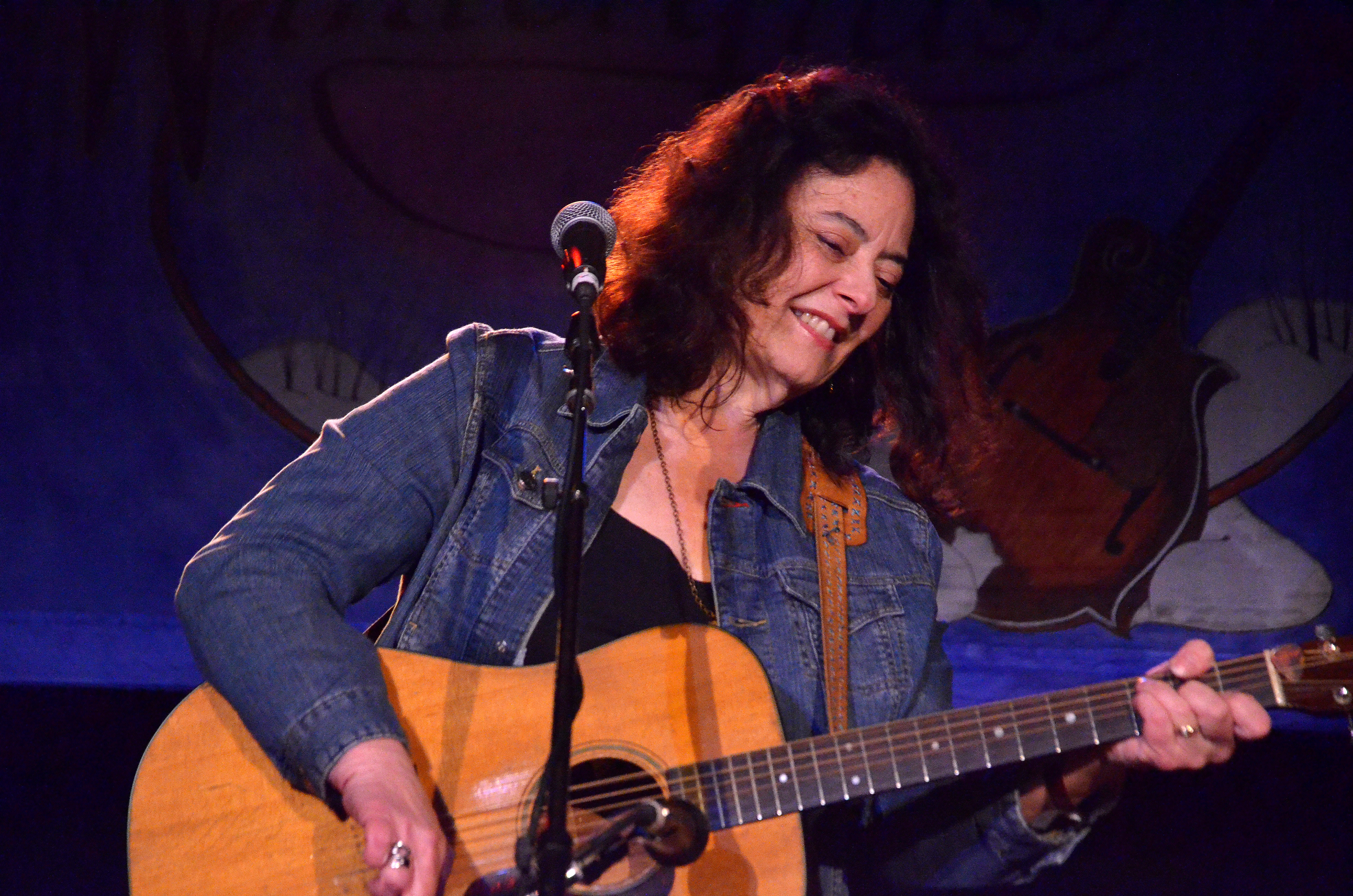

Background information
- Born: September 19, 1952 (age 73)
- Origin: Chicago, Illinois, United States
- Genres: Bluegrass, Folk, Americana
- Occupation: Musician
- Instruments: Vocals, Guitar, Upright Bass
- Labels: Live Oak Records, Copper Creek Records, Sugar Hill Records, Kaleidoscope/Flat Rock Records, Bay Records, Rounder Records, Spruce and Maple Music

Kathy Kallick (born September 19, 1952) is an American bluegrass musician, bandleader, vocalist, guitar player, songwriter, and recording artist.

== Biography ==
Kallick's mother, Dodi Kallick, was a leading member of the Chicago-area folk music scene of the 1950s and '60s. She helped establish Chicago's Old Town School of Folk Music and was the first performer at the No Exit Cafe (in Rogers Park, Chicago), introducing traditional musicians such as Frank Proffitt to midwestern audiences. Kallick's father, Bruce Kallick, is an amateur guitarist who gave Kathy a Doc Watson LP record along with her first guitar.

Kallick began performing by singing harmony with her mother, and she attended numerous acoustic music concerts and festivals as a teen. Inspired by other Chicago songwriters of the time such as John Prine, Steve Goodman, and Tom Dundee, she began writing and performing her own songs at coffeehouses. When Kallick accompanied old-time fiddler Michael Drayton, she switched from being a fingerpicking to flatpicking guitarist. She discovered bluegrass music while attending the San Francisco Art Institute (BFA, 1977), where the local music scene was welcoming to women and songwriters.

== Bands ==
=== 1970s ===
In 1975, Kathy Kallick, Laurie Lewis, Barbara Mendelsohn, Dorothy Baxter, and Sue Shelasky performed three songs at an open mic. This marked the beginning of the Good Ol’ Persons, one of the first all-women bluegrass bands. They released an album in 1977 (by which time Sue was replaced by brother Paul Shelasky) and enjoyed a twenty-year run, releasing five albums and touring throughout the U.S., including two appearances at Bill Monroe's Beanblossom Festival, as well as performances in Canada and Europe.

=== 1980s ===
By 1980, the Good Ol' Persons lineup consisted of Kathy Kallick (guitar), John Reischman (mandolin), Sally Van Meter (dobro), fiddler Paul Shelasky (later Kevin Wimmer), and bassist Bethany Raine (later Beth Weil, then Todd Phillips). They were one of the first bluegrass bands to incorporate Latin, swing, folk, Cajun, and other musical genres into their music, as well as featuring the songwriting, lead playing, and vocal harmonies of women.

=== 1996-Present ===
After the Good Ol' Persons disbanded, Kallick released three albums under her own name for Sugar Hill Records. In 1996, she formed the Kathy Kallick Band. Personnel for their first ten years and two albums included Tom Bekeny on mandolin, Amy Stenberg on bass, Avram Siegel on banjo, and, for the second, fiddler Brian Wicklund. The current iteration consists of Kallick, Bekeny, Annie Staninec on fiddle, Greg Booth on dobro and banjo, and Cary Black (previously Dan Booth) on bass; they have released three albums: Between the Hollow and the Highrise (2010), Time (2012), and Foxhounds (2015), and the band continues to tour widely across North America and Europe.

== Other musical collaborations ==
Kallick has continued to collaborate with Laurie Lewis since their Good Ol’ Persons days, releasing two albums, the latest of which is a tribute to their bluegrass mentors, Laurie & Kathy Sing the Songs Of Vern & Ray (2014). Kallick and Lewis also toured Japan with an all-star all-women band that also included Sally Van Meter, Lynn Morris, and Markie Sanders. She has also toured and recorded with first generation bluegrass masters Frank Wakefield and Mac Martin, produced albums for High Country and Richard Brandenburg, and written and recorded award-winning music for children and families. Kallick appeared on four high-profile collections of bluegrass songs by women, as well as numerous compilation albums, some of which are included in the discography below.

She has worked with many of the country's other acclaimed acoustic musicians, including, in addition to those already mentioned, Peter Rowan, Jerry Douglas, Stuart Duncan, Claire Lynch, Tim O'Brien, Ron Stewart, Jody Stecher, Kate Brislin, Darol Anger, Carol Elizabeth Jones, James Leva, Sandy Rothman, Bill Evans, Molly Tuttle, and Clive Gregson.

== Teaching ==
Kallick is an experienced instructor, and has offered classes in singing, songwriting, guitar, and band coaching as part of many music camps including the California Bluegrass Association Music Camp, Rockygrass Academy (Colorado), Augusta Heritage Center (West Virginia), Sore Fingers (England), Puget Sound Guitar Workshop (Washington), Nimblefingers (British Columbia, Canada), Bluegrass at the Beach (Oregon), Walker Creek Music Camp (California), and the California Coast Music Camp.

== Awards ==
Kallick has won a Grammy and two International Bluegrass Music Awards for True Life Blues: The Songs of Bill Monroe. She also received a Lifetime Achievement Award from the Northern California Bluegrass Society and a Lifetime Membership Award from the California Bluegrass Association.

== Discography ==
Released	Title	Label	Group
1983	I Can’t Stand To Ramble	Kaleidoscope	Good Ol’ Persons
1986	Part Of A Story	Kaleidoscope	Good Ol’ Persons
1989	Anywhere The Wind Blows	Kaleidoscope	Good Ol’ Persons
1991	Together	Kaleidoscope	Laurie Lewis & Kathy Kallick
1991	What Do You Dream About?	Live Oak	Kathy Kallick
1993	Matters Of The Heart	Sugar Hill	Kathy Kallick
1995	Use A Napkin (Not Your Mom)	Sugar Hill	Kathy Kallick
1995	Good N’ Live	Sugar Hill	Good Ol’ Persons
1996	Call Me A Taxi	Sugar Hill	Kathy Kallick
1999	Walkin’ In My Shoes	Live Oak	Kathy Kallick Band
2002	My Mother’s Voice	Copper Creek	Kathy Kallick
2004	Reason & Rhyme	Copper Creek	Kathy Kallick
2005	Warmer Kind Of Blue	Copper Creek	Kathy Kallick Band
2005	The Good Ol’ Persons	Bay Sound	Good Ol’ Persons
2010	Between The Hollow & The High-Rise	Live Oak	Kathy Kallick Band
2011	Count Your Blessings – A Bluegrass Gospel Collection	Live Oak	Kathy Kallick
2012	Time	Live Oak	Kathy Kallick Band
2014	Cut To The Chase	Live Oak	Kathy Kallick
2014	Laurie & Kathy Sing The Songs Of Vern & Ray	Spruce and Maple	Laurie Lewis & Kathy Kallick
2015	Foxhounds	Live Oak	Kathy Kallick Band
