= Forest Lawn Memorial Gardens =

Cemetery in Davidson County, Tennessee, US

Coordinates: 36.295°N 86.725°W

Forest Lawn Memorial Garden
- Interactive map of Forest Lawn Memorial Garden

Details
- Established: 1960
- Location: 1150 Dickerson Pike, Goodlettsville, Tennessee

Forest Lawn Memorial Gardens is a cemetery noted for the number of musicians' graves located within it. It was established in 1960, and is located at 1150 Dickerson Pike in Goodlettsville, Tennessee, just north of Nashville. One area of the cemetery is designated as "Music Row" for the number of country music entertainers that are interred there, including three musicians who died in the 1963 plane crash with Patsy Cline as well as singer Jack Anglin who died in a car accident on his way to her funeral.

== Notable interments ==
- David "Stringbean" Akeman (1915–1973), comedian, Old-Time banjo player
- Jack Anglin (1916–1963), musician
- Lloyd "Cowboy" Copas (1913–1963), musician
- Lefty Frizzell (1928–1975), singer/songwriter
- Hawkshaw Hawkins (1923–1963), musician
- Don Helms (1927–2008), steel guitarist
- Autry Inman (1929–1988), rockabilly musician
- Brother Oswald Kirby (1911–2002), musician
- Benny Martin (1928–2001), Bluegrass fiddler
- Roy Wiggins (1926–1999), steel guitarist

== See also ==
- List of United States cemeteries
