= Benny Martin =

American singer-songwriter (1928–2001)

- Born: Benny Edward Martin; May 8, 1928; Sparta, Tennessee, United States
- Died: March 13, 2001 (aged 72)
- Genres: Country
- Occupation: Country artist
- Instrument: Fiddle Guitar
- Years active: 1940s–1990s

Benny Edward Martin (May 8, 1928 – March 13, 2001), was an American bluegrass fiddler who invented the eight-string fiddle. Throughout his musical career he performed with artists such as the Bluegrass Boys, Don Reno, the Smoky Mountain Boys and Flatt and Scruggs, and later performed and recorded with the Stanley Brothers, Hylo Brown, Jimmy Martin, Johnnie and Jack, and the Stonemans, among others. He was inducted into the International Bluegrass Music Hall of Fame in 2005.

== Biography ==
Born in Sparta, Tennessee, United States, his father and two of his sisters played music professionally. From childhood, he learned the fiddle taught to him by Carl Alverson, Sr., of Sparta and ukulele, as well as the guitar and in his early teens left home to go to Nashville to pursue a full-time career as a country musician.

Martin was working at radio station WLAC in Nashville, Tennessee in 1948 when he was asked to replace Bill Monroe's fiddler Chubby Wise, who was going to leave the Bluegrass Boys. In 1949, he became a member of Don Reno's Tennessee Cutups. For the next seventeen years, until December 1966, Don Reno and Martin performed on and off together. In 1950, Martin joined Roy Acuff's Smoky Mountain Boys on the Grand Ole Opry, staying with the group until the fall of 1951. During 1951, Martin appeared on all 20 songs at Roy Acuff's last three recording sessions for Columbia Records, playing fiddle, mandolin, guitar, and banjo. In 1952, he joined Flatt and Scruggs and the Foggy Mountain Boys cutting eight songs. On these recordings he played with a bluesy and jazzy flavour that complemented Scruggs' playing. Following a tenure with Johnnie and Jack and the Tennessee Mountain Boys, he returned to Monroe's Bluegrass Boys in 1959, but left within a year. In the 1960s, he toured once again with Roy Acuff and the Smoky Mountain Boys.

Martin was a member of Grand Ole Opry and had his own show, The Benny Martin Show. Over the years, Martin performed and recorded with many different artists such as the Stanley Brothers, Jimmy Martin, Johnnie and Jack, and the Stonemans. He recorded at least four singles, one for Gulf Reef, "Thinking About Love" and "The Man Next Door" and three for Starday "Hello City Limits" "I'll Never Get Over Loving You", "Pretty Girl" "Dimes Worth of Dreams" and "You are the One" with his wife Joanne "No One But You." He hired Colonel Tom Parker as his manager and eventually would work as the opening act for some of the early Elvis Presley concerts.

Fiddle and banjo player John Hartford was inspired by Martin in the 1950s and over the decades they played together on multiple albums and projects. Said Hartford, "I first heard Benny Martin with Lester Flatt and Earl Scruggs in the early fifties and his playing opened up a whole new world to me of how the fiddle should go… [He] played these lush beautiful chords and slides that just hugged and danced and got up all around me and before the music was over I was bouncing off the walls.”

In 1997, after a long retirement and affliction with spasmodic dysphonia, an illness that affected his ability to talk and sing, Benny Martin emerged to record a two part project entitled The 'Big Tiger' Roars Again (Parts 1&2) on OMS Records. Produced by Hugh Moore, the cream of contemporary bluegrass and country music stars that contributed was impressive and included Vince Gill, Jerry Douglas, Ronnie McCoury, Ricky Skaggs, Bryan Sutton and Alison Krauss.

Martin died in March 2001, and was interred in Forest Lawn Memorial Gardens in Goodlettsville, Tennessee.

== Legacy ==
Martin typified the "country stompin'" music, with his enthusiastic fiddling while dancing around on stage. For almost five decades, he was a popular entertainer who made numerous appearances throughout the United States and Europe. He also recorded a number of records on which he performed on the fiddle and sang vocals. Martin's fiddle style was revolutionary. His recordings with Flatt and Scruggs are among their best, and he's particularly remembered for "Someone Took My Place With You," which exemplifies his unique use of double stops. Martin continues to astonish and influence contemporary fiddlers even now, notably in the style of Michael Cleveland, who has recorded many tunes originated by Martin.

== Selected discography ==
- Country Music's Sensational Entertainer (Starday Records) – 1961
- Old Time Fiddlin' and Singin' (Mercury Wing Records) – 1964
- Southern Bluegrass Fiddle (Marathon Records) – 1974
- Rollin' (Lamb & Lion Records) – 1975
- Tennessee Jubilee (Flying Fish Records) – 1975
- Fiddle Collection (CMH Records) – 1976
- & His Electric Turkeys: Turkey In the Grass (CMH Records) – 1977
- Big Daddy of the Fiddle & Bow (CMH Records) – 1979
- Nashville Southern Fiddle (Re-issue of 1974's Southern Bluegrass Fiddle with one song omitted) (OAK Country Music) – 1988
- The "Big Tiger" Roars Again – Part 1 (OMS Records) – 1999
- The "Big Tiger" Roars Again – Part 2 (OMS Records) – 2001
