= Don Wayne Reno =

American musician (born 1963)

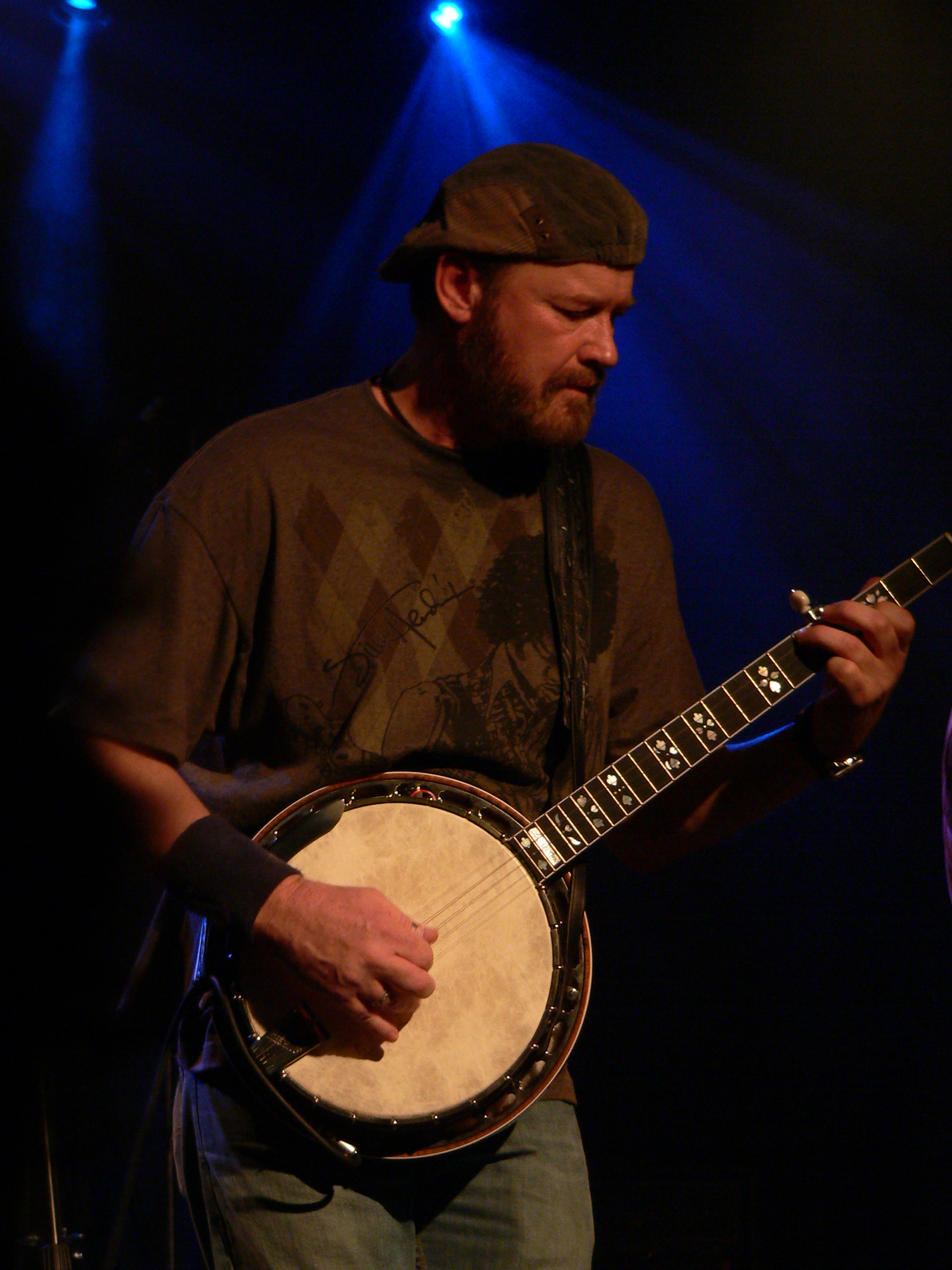
- Reno performing at a Hayseed Dixie gig in 2008

Background information
- Born: February 8, 1963 (age 63)
- Genre: Bluegrass
- Instrument: Banjo

Don Wayne Reno (born February 8, 1963, in Roanoke, Virginia) is a bluegrass musician and banjo player, and also an ordained minister. He is a son of famed bluegrass musician Don Reno. Reno was for several years a mainstay of Hayseed Dixie with his brother Dale Reno as the mandolinist. He currently works with his brother and Mitch Harrell in the band Reno and Harrell.
