= Flatt and Scruggs =

American bluegrass band

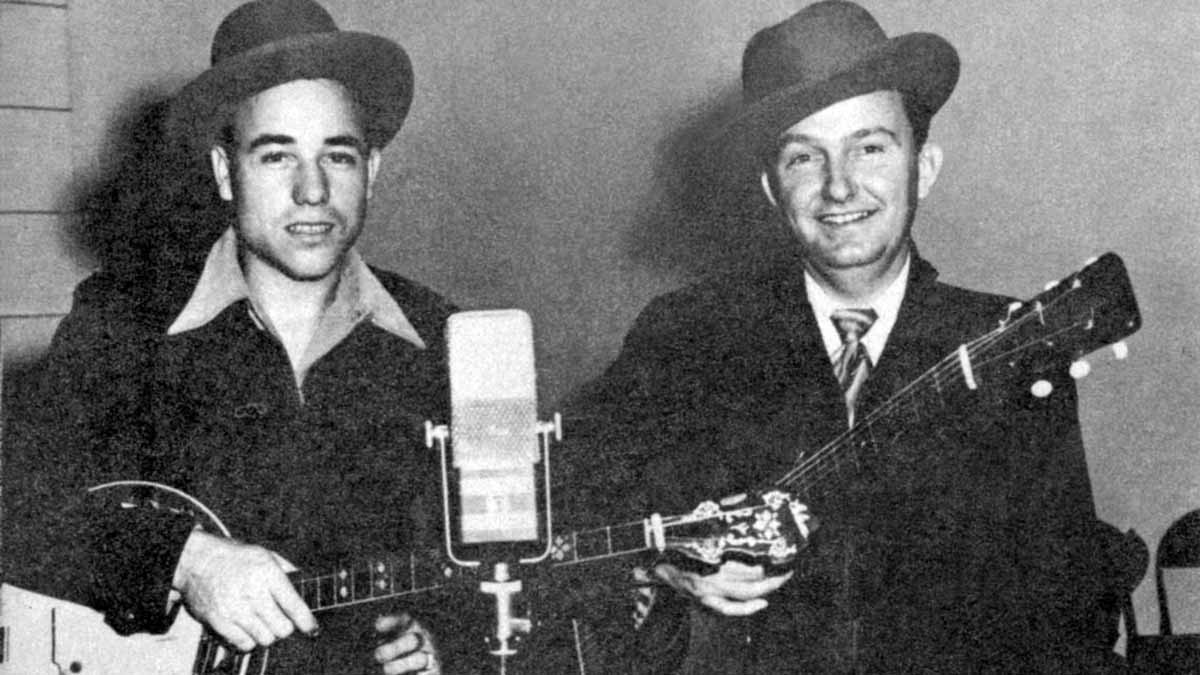
- Earl Scruggs (left) and Lester Flatt in 1949

Background information
- Origin: Tennessee (Flatt), North Carolina (Scruggs)
- Genres: Bluegrass, country
- Years active: 1948–1969
- Labels: Mercury, Columbia, Harmony
- Past members: Lester Flatt; Earl Scruggs

Flatt and Scruggs were an American bluegrass duo formed in 1948. The duo was formed by singer-guitarist Lester Flatt and banjo player Earl Scruggs, both of whom had been members of Bill Monroe's band, the Bluegrass Boys, from 1945 to 1948. Flatt and Scruggs are viewed by music historians as one of the premier bluegrass groups in the history of the genre.

Flatt and Scruggs recorded and performed together until 1969. Their backing band, the Foggy Mountain Boys, included fiddle player Paul Warren, a master player in both the old-time and bluegrass fiddling styles whose technique reflected all qualitative aspects of "the bluegrass breakdown" and fast bowing style; dobro player Burkett Howard "Uncle Josh" Graves, an innovator of the advanced playing style of the instrument now used in the genre; stand-up bass player English P. "Cousin Jake" Tullock; and mandolinist John "Curly" Seckler.

== History ==
Lester Flatt worked for Monroe at the time Earl Scruggs was considered for Bill Monroe's band, the Blue Grass Boys, in 1945. The two left that band early in 1948, and within a few months had formed the Foggy Mountain Boys. Flatt's rhythm-guitar style and vocals and Scruggs' banjo style gave them a distinctive sound that won them many fans. In 1955, they became members of the Grand Ole Opry.

Scruggs, who had always shown progressive tendencies, experimented on duets with saxophonist King Curtis and added songs by the likes of Bob Dylan to the group's repertoire. Flatt, a traditionalist, did not like these changes, and the group broke up in 1969. Following the breakup, Lester Flatt founded the Nashville Grass and Scruggs led the Earl Scruggs Revue. Flatt died of heart failure in Nashville, Tennessee, May 11, 1979 at the age of 64. Scruggs died from natural causes on March 28, 2012 in a Nashville hospital.

Flatt and Scruggs were elected to the Country Music Hall of Fame in 1985. In 2003, they ranked No. 24 on CMT's 40 Greatest Men of Country Music, one of only four non-solo artists to make the list (Eagles, Alabama, and Brooks & Dunn are the others).

== Members ==
- Lester Flatt (guitar)
- Earl Scruggs (banjo, guitar)
- Paul Warren (fiddle)
- John Ray "Curly" Seckler (mandolin, guitar)
- Josh Graves (Dobro, bass)
- English P. “Cousin Jake” Tullock (bass)
- Chubby Wise (fiddle)
- Jim Shumate (fiddle)
- Benny Martin (fiddle)
- Benny Sims (fiddle)
- Howdy Forrester (fiddle)
- Art Wooten (fiddle)
- Howard Watts a.k.a. "Cedric Rainwater" (bass)
- Charles Johnson a.k.a. "Little Jody Rainwater" (bass)
- Frank "Hylo" Brown (bass, guitar)
- Charles “Little Darlin’” Elza (bass)
- Joe Stuart (bass)
- Ernie Newton (bass)
- Bob Moore (bass)
- Everett Lilly (mandolin)
- Jim Eanes (guitar)
- Mac Wiseman (guitar)
- Billy E. Powers (guitar)
- Johnny Johnson (guitar)
- Earl Taylor (mandolin and harmonica)
- Grover C. Deskins Jr. (harmonica)

== Notable songs ==
- "Foggy Mountain Breakdown": an instrumental originally released in 1949 and used in many rural car chase movie sequences, notably in Bonnie and Clyde. It has won two Grammy Awards.
- "The Ballad of Jed Clampett" (listen): used as the theme for the Beverly Hillbillies television series. The song reached No. 42 on the record charts during the series' debut season of 1962. The song hit No. 1 on the country charts in January 1963, and was the only number-one hit song of their career. The song is one of only five TV theme songs to ever reach No. 1 on the country charts.
- Martha White jingle (still used in advertising today).
- "Petticoat Junction": theme from the TV series.

== Discography ==
=== Albums ===
Year	Album	Chart Positions		Label
Year	Album	US Country	US	Label
1957	Foggy Mountain Jamboree	—	—	Columbia
1958	Country Music	—	—	Mercury
1959	Lester Flatt & Earl Scruggs	—	—	Mercury
1960	Songs of Glory	—	—	Columbia
1961	Foggy Mountain Banjo	—	—	Columbia
1961	Songs of the Famous Carter Family	—	—	Columbia
1962	Folk Songs of Our Land	—	—	Columbia
1963	Hard Travelin' (The Ballad of Jed Clampett)	—	115	Columbia
1963	The Original Sound	—	—	Mercury
1963	Flatt and Scruggs at Carnegie Hall!	7	134	Columbia
1964	Recorded Live at Vanderbilt University	10	—	Columbia
1964	The Fabulous Sound of Lester Flatt & Earl Scruggs	2	—	Columbia
1965	The Versatile Flatt & Scruggs	—	—	Columbia
1965	Great Original Recordings	—	—	Columbia
1966	Town and Country	15	—	Columbia
1966	When the Saints Go Marching In	—	—	Columbia
1966	Flatt & Scruggs' Greatest Hits	34	—	Columbia
1966	Sacred Songs	—	—	Columbia
1967	Strictly Instrumental (w/ Doc Watson)	—	—	Columbia
1967	Hear the Whistles Blow	37	—	Columbia
1968	Changin' Times featuring Foggy Mountain Breakdown	7	194	Columbia
1968	Songs to Cherish	—	—	Columbia
1968	Original Theme From Bonnie & Clyde	26	161	Columbia
1968	The Story of Bonnie & Clyde	23	187	Columbia
1968	Nashville Airplane	35	—	Columbia
1970	Final Fling	45	—	Columbia
1970	Breaking Out	35	—	Columbia
1970	20 All-Time Great Recordings	—	—	Columbia

=== Hit singles ===
Year	Single	Peak chart positions				Album
Year	Single	US Country	US	CAN Country	CAN	Album
1949	"Foggy Mountain Breakdown"	9	—	—	—	Non-album singles
1952	"'Tis Sweet to Be Remembered"	9	—	—	—	Non-album singles
1959	"Cabin in the Hills"	9	—	—	—	Non-album singles
1960	"Crying My Heart Out Over You"	21	—	—	—	Non-album singles
1961	"Polka on a Banjo"	12	—	—	—	Non-album singles
1961	"Go Home"	10	—	—	—	Non-album singles
1962	"Just Ain't"	16	—	—	—	Non-album singles
1962	"The Legend of the Johnson Boys"	27	—	—	—	Folk Songs of Our Land
1962	"The Ballad of Jed Clampett"	1	44	—	—	Hard Travelin' (The Ballad of Jed Clampett)
1963	"Pearl Pearl Pearl"	8	113	—	—	Non-album singles
1963	"New York Town"	26	—	—	—	Non-album singles
1964	"You Are My Flower"	12	—	—	—	Recorded Live at Vanderbilt University
1964	"My Sara Jane"	40	—	—	—	Non-album singles
1964	"Petticoat Junction"	14	—	—	—	Non-album singles
1964	"Workin' It Out"	21	—	—	—	Non-album singles
1965	"I Still Miss Someone"	43	—	—	—	The Versatile Flatt & Scruggs
1967	"Nashville Cats"	54	—	—	—	Non-album singles
1967	"California Up Tight Band"	20	—	—	—	Non-album singles
1968	"Down in the Flood"	45	—	15	—	Changing Times featuring Foggy Mountain Breakdown
1968	"Foggy Mountain Breakdown"	58	55	—	90	Changing Times featuring Foggy Mountain Breakdown
1968	"Like a Rolling Stone"	58	125	—	—	Nashville Airplane
