= Morris Brothers =

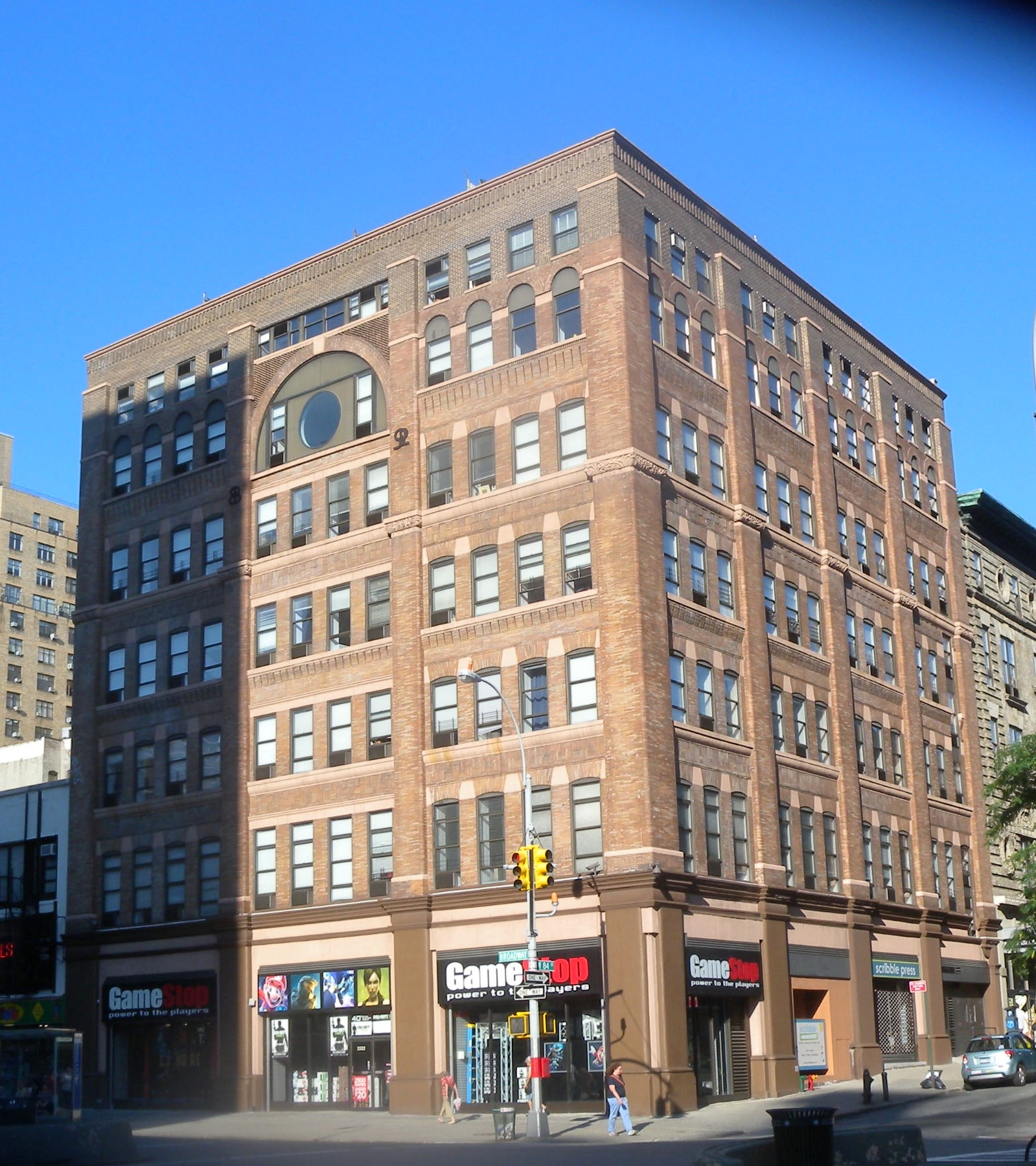
Site of Morris Brothers' Broadway & West 84th Street location

Morris Brothers was a retail clothing store that became a New York City fixture between its World War II-era founding and its closing in 2007. Located from 1981 at Broadway and West 84th Street in Manhattan, the establishment was an Upper West Side retail institution alongside the likes of Zabar's delicatessen, the Thalia movie theater, and the Murder Ink bookstore. Morris Brothers became best known for its sale of summer camp clothing, often to generations of the same family.

== History ==
Morris Krumholtz and his brother founded Morris Brothers in 1939 or 1943 (sources differ) as an Army-Navy store on Second Avenue and East 101st Street in Manhattan. The store later moved to Broadway and West 98th Street before moving first to Broadway and 85th Street and finally, in 1981, to 2322 Broadway, at West 84th Street. The family expanded that space in 1985 to 5,000 square feet (460 m^{2}).

The original store's merchandise expanded over the years to include children's clothing, before eventually dropping infant and toddlerwear to become a casualwear family clothing store and camp outfitter. Labeling summer-camp wear with children's names become a hallmark, creating a tradition that helped retain as customers former New Yorkers who had moved to the suburbs.

Proprietor Barry Krumholtz, son of founder Morris, told the press in May 2007 that landlord Eagle Court LLC had scheduled a rent increase from $600,000 annually to $1.5 million, necessitating a shutdown by the August 2007 lease expiry date.
