= Jim & Jesse =

American bluegrass duo (1945–2002)

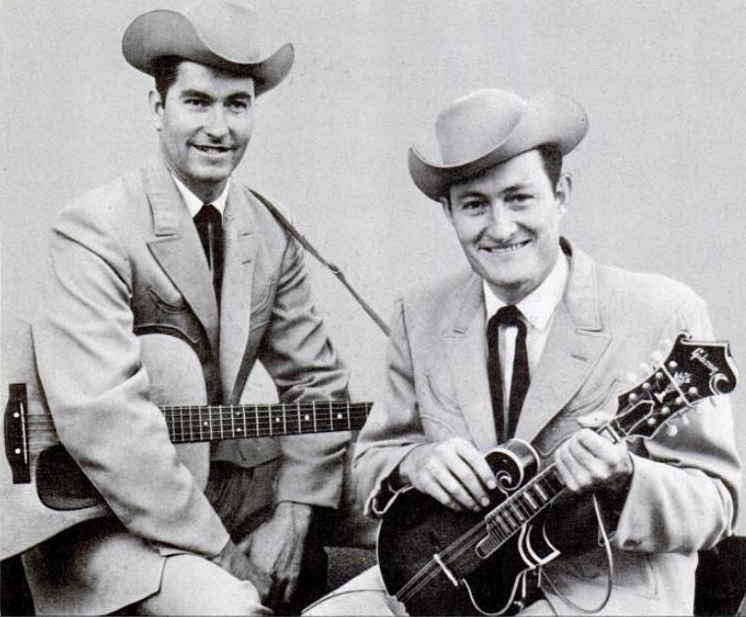
- Jim & Jesse in 1965

Background information
- Origin: Carfax, Virginia, U.S.
- Genres: Bluegrass, country
- Years active: 1945–2002
- Labels: Epic, Hilltop, Harmony, Capitol, CMH, Soundwaves, MSR, Rural Rhythm, Pinecastle
- Past members: Jim McReynolds; Jesse McReynolds
- Website: Official website

Jim & Jesse were an American bluegrass music duo of brothers, Jim McReynolds (February 13, 1927 – December 31, 2002) and Jesse McReynolds (July 9, 1929 – June 23, 2023). They were born and raised in Carfax, a community near Coeburn, Virginia, United States.

== Career ==
Jesse played the mandolin with a unique, self-invented "crosspicking" and "split-string" playing method, and Jim sang as a high tenor and played guitar. They played with their backing band, The Virginia Boys, consisting of a five-string banjo, fiddle, and bass player. The Virginia Boys have included musicians such as fiddler Vassar Clements, banjo player Allen Shelton, Mike Scott, Vic Jordan, Bobby Thompson, Carl Jackson, fiddler Jimmy Buchanan, Glen Duncan, Jesse's oldest son, the late Keith McReynolds, Randall Franks, and many more.

After the death of his brother Jim, Jesse continued to perform with their Virginia Boys band. He still performed in the bluegrass music tradition, but added other genres of music to his repertoire, including Chuck Berry and Grateful Dead songs. Jesse participated in a 2010 tribute to Jerry Garcia and Robert Hunter titled Jesse McReynolds & Friends Tribute to Jerry Garcia and Robert Hunter: Songs of the Grateful Dead, released on Woodstock Records. It features Garcia's friends David Nelson and Sandy Rothman, along with Stu Allen, of the present Jerry Garcia Acoustic Band.

Jesse's band line-up included Keith's son, Garrett McReynolds, as tenor singer/rhythm guitarist. On special occasions, Jesse took out the historic fiddle his grandfather played on the Bristol Sessions, and let his grandson Luke McKnight do the cross-picking that Jesse created. Rounding out the group was Travis Wetzel on fiddle, Gary Reece on banjo, and Larry Carney on guitar.

== Recordings ==
In 1952, Jim & Jesse were signed to their first major label, Capitol Records. They have also recorded for Columbia Records, Epic Records, and Opryland USA. They also released under their own Old Dominion record label. In 1960, their first single for Columbia was "The Flame of Love" backed by "Gosh I Miss You All the Time". Their other classic songs include "Cotton Mill Man", "Diesel on My Tail", "Are You Missing Me", and "Paradise".

In the late 1950s and early 1960s, Jim and Jesse starred on the live radio show, the Suwannee River Jamboree, broadcast on Saturday nights from Live Oak, Florida, on WNER radio. The show was also syndicated throughout the Southeastern United States. The brothers replaced the Stanley Brothers on the show. They left when Martha White began using the duo as a sponsor.

On March 2, 1964, they were invited to join the Grand Ole Opry after making several appearances as guest performers, and they moved to Gallatin, Tennessee, later that year.

Jim and Jesse joined producers Randall Franks and Alan Autry for the In the Heat of the Night cast album Christmas Time's A-Comin', performing the title song with the cast. The album became one of the most popular Christmas releases of 1991 and 1992 with Southern retailers. Jesse also added his mandolin talents to a vocal performance of "Bring a Torch Jeanette Isabella" by actor Carroll O'Connor.

Jesse continued to perform at numerous folk festivals representing the traditional arts and some of his new styles.

== Personal lives ==
The McReynolds' grandfather, Charles McReynolds, had led the band The Bull Mountain Moonshiners, who recorded at the Bristol Sessions in 1927.

In 2002, both brothers were diagnosed with different types of cancer. Jesse's battle was successful, but Jim died in 2002 at the age of 75, ending the longest active professional brother duet in country music history, at 55 years.

Jesse carried on the Jim & Jesse tradition and continued to play the Grand Ole Opry and special dates with his band, as well as being a guest with other groups. He died of natural causes in Nashville, Tennessee, on June 23, 2023 at the age of 93.

== Awards and honors ==
The duo's honors include induction into the Country Music Hall of Fame's "Walkway of Stars", the Virginia Country Music Hall of Fame, the International Bluegrass Music Association's Hall of Honor, and Bill Monroe's Bluegrass Hall of Fame. Individually and collectively they were nominated for several Grammy Awards. They also received a National Heritage Fellowship from the National Endowment for the Arts, presented by Hillary Clinton and Jane Alexander at The White House on September 23, 1997.

In 2004, Jesse was honored with a nomination by the International Bluegrass Music Association for his project Bending the Rules as Instrumental Recording of the Year.

== Discography ==
=== Albums ===
Year	Album	US Country	Label
1963	Bluegrass Special	—	Epic
1963	Bluegrass Classics	—	Epic
1964	The Old Country Church	—	Epic
1965	Y'all Come	—	Epic
1965	Berry Pickin' in the Country	—	Epic
1966	Sing Unto Him a New Song	—	Epic
1966	Sacred Songs We Love	—	Vernon Records
1967	Diesel on My Tail	13	Epic
1968	All-Time Great Country Instrumentals	—	Epic
1969	Saluting the Louvin Brothers	—	Epic
1970	We Like Trains	—	Epic
1970	Wildwood Flower	—	Harmony
1972	Mandolin Workshop	—	Hilltop Records
1974	Superior Sounds of Bluegrass	—	Old Dominion Records
1980	Jim & Jesse Today!	—	CMH Records
1982	Jim & Jesse & Charlie (with Charlie Louvin)	—	Soundwaves
1990	The Jim & Jesse Story	—	CMH Records
1991	Music Among Friends	—	Rounder
1997	Tribute to Bill Monroe	—	AMI
1998	Songs From the Homeplace	—	Pinecastle
2001	Our Kind of Country	—	Pinecastle
2002	American Pride	—	Pinecastle
2003	'Tis Sweet to be Remembered	—	Pinecastle

=== Singles ===
Year	Single	US Country	Album
1964	"Cotton Mill Man"	43	single only
1964	"Better Times A-Coming"	39	Y'all Come
1967	"Diesel on My Tail"	18	Diesel on My Tail
1967	"The Ballad of Thunder Road"	44	Diesel on My Tail
1968	"Greenwich Village Folk Song Salesman"	49	single only
1968	"Yonder Comes a Freight Train"	56	We Like Trains
1970	"The Golden Rocket"	38	We Like Trains
1971	"Freight Train"	44	We Like Trains
1982	"North Wind" (with Charlie Louvin)	56	Jim & Jesse & Charlie
1986	"Oh Louisiana"	78	single only
