= J. E. Mainer =

American fiddler (1898–1971)

- Also known as: J. E. Mainer
- Born: Joseph Emmett Mainer; July 20, 1898; Weaverville, North Carolina US
- Died: June 12, 1971 (aged 72)
- Genres: Old-time
- Occupation: Musician
- Instruments: Fiddle, banjo
- Labels: Bluebird

J. E. Mainer (July 20, 1898 – June 12, 1971) was an American old time fiddler who followed in the wake of Gid Tanner and his Skillet Lickers.

== Biography ==
Joseph Emmett Mainer grew up on a farm in the mountains near Weaverville, North Carolina, United States, and learned to play the banjo and fiddle from an early age. Since Wade, his brother, also was interested in learning to play the banjo, he left that to Wade and concentrated on the fiddle. Soon, Mainer began performing at local country barn dances. He found work at a textile mill in Knoxville, Tennessee, but moved to Concord, North Carolina in 1922 for another work in a mill.

Mainer's fame as a fiddler rose and sponsored by the Crazy Water Crystals in 1933, he and his newly formed band consisting of J. E. on fiddle, Wade Mainer on banjo, and Zeke Morris on guitar, made their radio debut on WBT in Charlotte, North Carolina, calling themselves J.E. Mainer and his Crazy Mountaineers. The band appeared on several radio stations in the following years until 1935, when they received a recording contract. In August the same year, the Mountaineers, with the addition of "Daddy" John Love, recorded for Bluebird Records. Wade Mainer and Zeke Morris temporarily left the band in the early 1936 to form a duo. In the meantime, Ollie Bunn, Howard Bumgardner and Clarence Todd replaced Wade, Zeke and "Daddy" John Love on the next recording session. In the summer of 1936, Wade and Zeke returned to record with "the mountaineers". The next year, in 1937, Wade Mainer formed the "Sons of the Mountaineers". Shortly, a new change of personnel occurred when Leonard "Lester" Stokes and George Morris became members of "the mountaineers" calling themselves "Handsome and Sambo". They added Snuffy Jenkins on banjo on the following recording session. In late 1938, Stokes and Morris were once more replaced by Clyde Moody and Jay Hugh Hall. The band continued to perform on radio stations in both North and South Carolina.

The Mountaineers disbanded at the outbreak of World War II, but Mainer continued to record in the late 1940s, together with his sons, Glenn and Curly, for King Records. Between 1967 and 1971, the year of his death, literally hundreds of post-war recordings were released on Rural Rhythm Records.

Mainer was inducted into the North Carolina Music Hall of Fame on October 11, 2012.

== Original discography ==
=== J. E. Mainer's Mountaineers ===
Matrix	Title	Record #	Recording date	Notes
94328	"Ship's Sailing Now"	Bluebird 6088	August 6, 1935	
94329	"This World Is Not My Home"	Bluebird 6088	August 6, 1935	
94330	"Maple On the Hill"	Bluebird 6065	August 6, 1935	
94331	"Take Me In the Lifeboat"	Bluebird 6065	August 6, 1935	
94332	"Seven and a Half"	Bluebird 6792	August 6, 1935	
94333	"New Curly Headed Baby"	Bluebird 6104	August 6, 1935	
94336	"Broken Hearted Blues"	Bluebird 6090	August 6, 1935	
94337	"Greenback Dollar"	Bluebird 6090	August 6, 1935	
94338	"Let Her Go God Bless Her"	Bluebird 6104	August 6, 1935	
94339	"City On the Hill"	Bluebird 6160	August 6, 1935	
94340	"The Longest Train"	Bluebird 6222	August 6, 1935	
94341	"Write a Letter To Mother"	Bluebird 6194	August 6, 1935	
94342	"Lights In the Valley"	Bluebird 6160	August 6, 1935	
94343	"Searching For a Pair of Blue Eyes"	Bluebird 6194	August 6, 1935	
99106	"My Wife Went Away and Left Me"	Bluebird 6294	February 14, 1936	
99107	"Railroad Blues"	Bluebird 6624	February 14, 1936	
99109	"Over the Hills In Carolina"	Bluebird 6675	February 14, 1936	
99110	"Budded Roses"	Bluebird 6675	February 14, 1936	
99111	"What Makes Him Do It"	Bluebird 6624	February 14, 1936	
99112	"My Little Red Ford"	Bluebird 6294	February 14, 1936	
99113	"Goin' Back West In the Fall"	Bluebird 6440	February 14, 1936	
99114	"New Lost Train Blues"	Bluebird 6424	February 14, 1936	
99115	"Number 111"	Bluebird 6424	February 14, 1936	
99116	"I Am Walking In the Light"	Bluebird 6385	February 14, 1936	
99117	"Don't Cause Mother's Hair To Turn Grey"	Bluebird 6324	February 14, 1936	
99118	"When I Reach My Home Eternal"	Bluebird 6385	February 14, 1936	
99119	"Fatal Wreck of the Bus"	Bluebird 6290	February 14, 1936	
99120	"Behind the Parlor Door"	Bluebird 6440	February 14, 1936	
99121	"Satisfied"	Bluebird 6324	February 14, 1936	
99122	"One To Love Me"	Bluebird 6290	February 14, 1936	
99138	"Maple On the Hill, Part 2"	Bluebird 6293	February 15, 1936	
99139	"Going To Georgia"	Bluebird 6423	February 15, 1936	
99140	"Nobody's Darling But Mine"	Bluebird 6423	February 15, 1936	
102600	"On a Cold Winter Night"	Bluebird 6629	June 15, 1936	
102601	"John Henry Was a Little Boy"	Bluebird 6629	June 15, 1936	
102602	"The Old and Faded Picture"	Bluebird 6479	June 15, 1936	
102603	"Take Me Home To the Sweet Sunny South"	Bluebird 6479	June 15, 1936	
102604	"Walk That Lonesome Valley"	Bluebird 6596	June 15, 1936	
102605	"Got a Home In that Rock"	Bluebird 6539	June 15, 1936	
102606	"Johnson's Old Grey Mule"	Bluebird 6584	June 15, 1936	
102607	"Won't Be Worried Long"	Bluebird 6738	June 15, 1936	
102608	"Going Down the River of Jordan"	Bluebird 6539	June 15, 1936	
102609	"Why Do You Bob Your Hair Girls"	Bluebird 6792	June 15, 1936	
102610	"Down Among the Budded Roses"	Bb unissued	June 15, 1936	
102611	"Watermelon On the Vine"	Bluebird 6584	June 15, 1936	
2530	"They Said My Lord Was a Devil"	Bluebird 6653	October 1936	
2533	"Just One Way To the Pearly Gates"	Bluebird 6784	October 1936	
2534	"Dear Daddy You're Gone"	Bluebird 6752	October 1936	
2537	"Cowboy's Pony In Heaven"	Bluebird 6653	October 1936	
11815	"I'm Not Turning Backward"	Bluebird 7165	August 2, 1937	
11818	"Mountain Sweetheart"	Bluebird 7587	August 2, 1937	
11819	"Don't Forget Me Lil Darlin'"	Bluebird 7587	August 2, 1937	
11987	"We Can't Be Darlings Anymore"	Bluebird 7151	August 5, 1937	
11988	"Tell Mother I'll Meet Her"	Bluebird 7222	August 5, 1937	
11989	"In a Little Village Church Yard"	Bluebird 7222	August 5, 1937	
11990	"Carry Your Cross With a Smile"	Bluebird 7523	August 5, 1937	
11991	"Swing the Door of Your Heart Open Wide"	Bluebird 7401	August 5, 1937	Leonard Stokes/George Morris
11992	"Answer To Greenback Dollar"	Bluebird 7151	August 5, 1937	
11993	"There's A Green Hill Far Away"	Bluebird 7401	August 5, 1937	
11995	"Floating Down the Stream of Time"	Bluebird 7523	August 5, 1937	
11996	"Don't Go Out"	Bluebird 7349	August 5, 1937	
11997	"Don't Get Trouble In Your Mind"	Bluebird 7289	August 5, 1937	
11998	"Kiss Me Cindy"	Bluebird 7289	August 5, 1937	
18763	"Lonely Tomb"	Bluebird 7424	January 27, 1938	
18765	"All My Friends"	Bluebird 7424	January 27, 1938	
18767	"Don't Get Too Deep In Love"	Bluebird 7483	January 27, 1938	
18768	"Don't Leave Me Alone"	Bluebird 7561	January 27, 1938	
18769	"I Won't Be Worried"	Bluebird 7561	January 27, 1938	
18770	"Where Romance Calls"	Bluebird 7753	January 27, 1938	
18771	"Another Alabama Camp Meeting"	Bluebird 7753	January 27, 1938	
26981	"Farther Along"	Bluebird 8023	September 1938	
26982	"Dear Loving Mother and Dad"	Bluebird 8152	September 1938	
26983	"Can't Tell About These Women"	Bluebird 7965	September 1938	
26985	"If I Had Listened To Mother"	Bluebird 8137	September 1938	
26986	"She Is Spreading Her Wings For a Journey"	Bluebird 8023	September 1938	
26997	"Mother Still Prays For You"	Bluebird 8137	September 1938	
27702	"More Good Women Gone Wrong"	Bluebird 7965	September 1938	
32625	"Sparkling Blue Eyes"	Bluebird 8042	February 1939	
32626	"We Will Miss Him"	Bluebird 8042	February 1939	
32627	"I Left My Home In the Mountains"	Bluebird 8091	February 1939	
32628	"I Met Her At a Ball One Night"	Bluebird 8091	February 1939	
32629	"You May Forsake Me"	Bluebird 8120	February 1939	
32630	"Look On and Cry"	Bluebird 8120	February 1939	
32631	"One Little Kiss"	Bluebird 8145	February 1939	
32632	"Mama Don't Make Me Go To Bed"	Bluebird 8145	February 1939	
32635	"Drunkard's Hiccoughs"	Bluebird 8400	February 4, 1939	
32636	"Country Blues"	Bluebird 8187	February 4, 1939	
32637	"I'm A Poor Pilgrim"	Montgomery W. 7880	February 4, 1939	
32638	"Concord Rag"	Bluebird 8187	February 4, 1939	
?	"Crying Holy"	Bluebird 8203	1939	
?	"Heaven's Bells Are Ringing"	Bluebird 8203		

=== Daddy John Love ===
Matrix	Title	Record #	Recording date
102725	"I Am Dreaming of Mother"	Bluebird 6583	June 20, 1936
102726	"Cotton Mill Blues"	Bluebird 6491	June 20, 1936
102727	"Blue Days"	Bluebird 6583	June 20, 1936
102728	"There's No Place Like Home"	Bluebird 6491	June 20, 1936
102729	"Homeless Child"	Bluebird 8199	June 20, 1936
102730	"Where Is My Mama"	Bluebird 8199	June 20, 1936

=== Leonard Stokes/George Morris ===
Matrix	Title	Record #	Recording date
18600	"Your Best Friend Is Always Near"	Bluebird 7586	January 23, 1938
18601	"Lamp Lighting Time In Heaven"	Bluebird 7412	January 23, 1938
18602	"When the Light's Gone Out In Your Soul"	Bluebird 7586	January 23, 1938
18603	"Once I Loved a Young Man"	Bluebird 7659	January 23, 1938
18604	"Somebody Cares"	Bluebird 7659	January 23, 1938
18605	"I'm Living the Right Life Now"	Bluebird 7412	January 23, 1938
18606	"Just Over In the Glory Land"	Bluebird 7730	January 23, 1938
18607	"I'm In the Glory Land Way"	Bluebird 7730	January 23, 1938
18608	"If I Lose Let Me Lose"	Bluebird 7471	January 23, 1938
18609	"Great Reaping Day"	Bluebird 7958	January 23, 1938
18610	"Oh Why Did I Ever Get Married"	Bluebird 7471	January 23, 1938
18611	"Back To Johnson City"	Bluebird 7845	January 23, 1938

== Album discography ==
Album title	Record label	Record #	Release year
Good Ole Mountain Music	King Records	666	1958
The Legendary Family From The Blue Ridge Mountains	Arhoolie Records	F-5002	1963
The Legendary J.E. Mainer & The Mountaineers: Old Time Mountain Music	Rural Rhythm	RRJEM-185	1967
The Legendary J.E. Mainer & The Mountaineers: More Old Time Mountain Music	Rural Rhythm Records	RRJEM-191	1967
Happy 70th Birthday	Blue Jay Records	A-101	1968
The Legendary J.E. Mainer Volume 3: with Red Smiley & His Blue Grass Cut-Ups	Rural Rhythm Records	RRJEM-198	1968
The Legendary J.E. Mainer Volume 4	Rural Rhythm Records	RRJEM-208	1968
The Legendary J.E. Mainer Volume 5	Rural Rhythm Records	RRJEM-215	1968
J.E. Mainer's Crazy Mountaineers Volume 1	Old Timey Records	OT-106	1969
J.E. Mainer's Crazy Mountaineers Volume 2	Old-Timey Records	OT-107	1969
The Legendary J.E. Mainer Volume 6: Fiddling With His Girl Susan	Rural Rhythm Records	RRJEM-222	1969
The Legendary J.E. Mainer Volume 7: Whittlin', Fiddlin', and.....	Rural Rhythm Records	RRJEM-225	1969
The Legendary J.E. Mainer Volume 8	Rural Rhythm Records	RRJEM-227	1970
The Legendary J.E. Mainer Volume 9	Rural Rhythm Records	RRJEM-228	1970
The Legendary J.E. Mainer Volume 10: The Good Old Rebel	Rural Rhythm Records	RRJEM-229	1970
The Legendary J.E. Mainer Volume 11	Rural Rhythm Records	RRJEM-230	1970
The Legendary J.E. Mainer Volume 12	Rural Rhythm Records	RRJEM-231	1970
The Legendary J.E. Mainer Volume 13	Rural Rhythm Records	RRJEM-234	1970
The Legendary J.E. Mainer Volume 14	Rural Rhythm Records	RRJEM-240	1971
The Legendary J.E. Mainer Volume 15: with Morris Herbert	Rural Rhythm Records	RRJEM-241	1971
The Legendary J.E. Mainer Volume 16	Rural Rhythm Records	RRJEM-246	1972
The Legendary J.E. Mainer Volume 17: With Morris Herbert	Rural Rhythm Records	RRJEM-247	1972
The Gospel Music of the Legendary J.E. Mainer - Volume 18	Rural Rhythm Records	RRJEM-248	1972
The Fiddle Music of the Legendary J.E. Mainer - Volume 19	Rural Rhythm Records	RRJEM-249	1972
The Fiddle Music of the Legendary J.E. Mainer - Volume 20	Rural Rhythm Records	RRJEM-250	1972
Precious Memories (with E.P. Williams)	Blue Jay Records	LPA-102	1982
J.E. Mainer at home with Family & Friends	Old Homestead Records	OHCS-146	1983

== Other sources and external links ==
- J.E.Mainer's Mountaineers, Liner notes, Old Timey LP-106
- Tony Russell, Bob Pinson, Country Music Records: A Discography, 1921-1942, Country Music Hall of Fame & Museum, 2004
- Wiley and Zeke, The Morris Brothers
- The Online Discographical Project Retrieved on January 5, 2009.
