= Rural Rhythm Records =

Rural Rhythm
- Founded: 1955
- Founder: Jim O'Neal
- Distributor(s): Sony, New Day Christian Distributors
- Genre: Bluegrass, country, contemporary Christian
- Country of origin: U.S.
- Location: Nashville, Tennessee
- Official website: www.ruralrhythm.com/web/

Rural Rhythm Records is a record label based in Nashville, Tennessee specializing in recordings by bluegrass music and gospel music artists.

== History ==
"Uncle" Jim O'Neal founded the Rural Rhythm label in 1955 in Arcadia, California. He sold via mail order, records were often produced with a generic white front sleeve with a stamped serial number in the upper right corner.

O'Neal insisted records would sell for $3.50 apiece (as opposed to major label records that sold for $3.98 to $4.98). O'Neal also released 20 songs on each LP album, as opposed to major labels who released on average 12 songs on each LP.

O'Neal died in 1982, and Sam Passamano purchased Rural Rhythm in 1987.

The Heritage Collection brand reissues recordings from the 1950s–1960s Rural Rhythm archives. Recent Heritage artists include Hylo Brown, Red Smiley and The Blue Grass Cutups, and Mac Wiseman, Don Reno, Bill Harrell, J. E. Mainer, Curly Fox, Dale Potter, Earl Taylor, Max Martin, Buck Ryan, Lee Moore, Raymond Fairchild, and Jim Greer.

Besides the Heritage Collection brand, Rural Rhythm issues bluegrass recordings under the Sound Traditions and Bluegrass Power Picks brands.

In 2017, SONY Red Distribution became the distributors of Rural Rhythm mainstream recordings. New Day Christian Distributors continues to distribute their Christian recordings.

== Artists ==
Here is a partial list of artists who have released recordings on the Rural Rhythm label.

=== A – G ===
- Dave Adkins & Republik Steele
- Audie Blaylock and Redline
- Blue Moon Rising
- Brand New Strings
- Hylo Brown
- Melonie Cannon
- Vassar Clements
- The Cumberland Highlanders
- Doug Dillard
- Jim Eanes
- Bill Emerson and Sweet Dixie
- Ernie & Mack and the Bluegrass Cut-Ups
- Raymond Fairchild
- Curly Fox
- Gold Heart
- Jim Greer
- Steve Gulley

=== H – M ===
- Bill Harrell
- Carrie Hassler and Hard Rain
- Tim Hensley
- Clarence Jackson
- Jim & Jesse
- Clay Jones
- Randy Kohrs
- Locust Ridge
- Lonesome River Band
- J. E. Mainer
- The Marksmen Quartet
- Mac Martin
- Dwight McCall
- Lee Moore
- Russell Moore and IIIrd Tyme Out
- Mountain Heart
- Muleskinner
- Michael Martin Murphey
- Mark Houser and Bluegrass Drive

=== N – R ===
- Nevada Slim
- Nu-Blu
- Bobby Osborne
- Dale Potter
- Marty Raybon
- Lou Reid and Carolina
- Don Reno
- Ronnie Reno
- Brandon Rickman
- Ritchie Brothers
- The Roys
- Buck Ryan

=== S – Z ===
- Shady Creek Outlaws
- Cody Shuler & Pine Mountain Railroad
- Red Smiley
- Larry Sparks
- Tim Stafford
- Scotty Stoneman
- Earl Taylor
- Dick Unteed
- Jim Van Cleve
- James Wall
- Rickey Wasson
- The Wear Family
- Clarence White
- Oscar Whittington
- Mac Wiseman
- Stuart Wyrick

== See also ==
- List of record labels
