= Pappy Sherrill =

American Old Time and Bluegrass fiddler

- Also known as: Pappy Sherrill
- Born: Homer Lee Sherrill; March 23, 1915; Sherrills Ford, North Carolina, U.S.
- Died: November 30, 2001 (aged 86); Chapin, South Carolina, U.S.
- Genres: Bluegrass music, old time
- Occupation: Musician
- Instrument: fiddle
- Years active: 1928–2001
- Label: Rounder Records
- Website: www.snuffyandpappy.com

Homer "Pappy" Lee Sherrill (March 23, 1915, Sherrills Ford, North Carolina - November 30, 2001) was an American old time and bluegrass fiddler.

Pappy received his first fiddle, a tin model from Sears and Roebuck, at the age of seven. His first professional performance was in 1928 at Radio Station WSOC in Gastonia, North Carolina. In 1934 Pappy was performing for the Crazy Water Barn Dance on Charlotte, North Carolina's WBT radio station. It was while playing for Crazy Water Crystals that Pappy joined The Blue Sky Boys at station WWNC in Asheville, NC and later The Crazy Blue Ridge Hillbillies at station WGST in Atlanta, Ga. There, he met his wife and formed another band named The Smiling Rangers and moved back to Raleigh, NC at WPTF and then to Danville, VA for station WBTM.

In October 1939 Pappy joined the WIS Hillbillies. This introduced Pappy to Dewitt "Snuffy" Jenkins and began a musical friendship that would endure throughout their lifetime. In 1948 Byron Parker, "The Hired Hand", died. To honor the memory of their dear friend the WIS Hillbillies underwent a name change and became The Hired Hands. The Hired Hands became a veritable force in the country music scene in South Carolina and in 1954 they appeared on WIS-TV's very first day of broadcast. There, the group conducted a television show, "Carolina in the Morning."
