= Red Smiley =

- Also known as: "Red" Smiley
- Born: Arthur Lee Smiley; May 17, 1925; Asheville, North Carolina, U.S.
- Died: January 2, 1972 (aged 46) Philadelphia, Pennsylvania, U.S.
- Genres: Bluegrass, country
- Occupation: musician
- Instrument: Martin D-45 guitar
- Formerly of: Reno and Smiley

Arthur Lee "Red" Smiley (May 17, 1925 – January 2, 1972) was an American bluegrass and country musician, best known for his guitar playing with Don Reno under the name Reno and Smiley.

Smiley was born in Asheville, North Carolina, United States. He began recording with Don Reno in 1952 and the two formed Reno & Smiley. The two's partnership lasted until 1964 with a mutual parting of ways. In the later 1960s he would again work with Reno along with Bill Harrell. Mandolinist David Grisman played with Smiley's band early in his career. While returning home from a tour of Eastern Canada and the Northeastern United States, Smiley died in Philadelphia, Pennsylvania, in January 1972 at the age of 46, due to complications with diabetes. He was buried at the DeHart Cemetery in the Jackson Line community of Bryson City, North Carolina.

== Legacy ==
In 1992, he was posthumously inducted into the International Bluegrass Music Hall of Honor, now called the International Bluegrass Music Hall of Fame.
