= Don Reno =

American singer-songwriter (1926–1984)

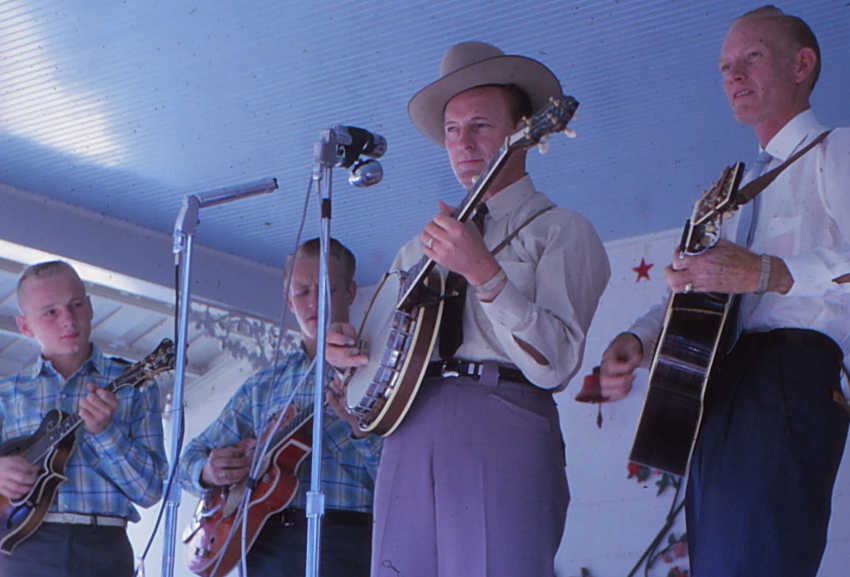
- Reno (third from the left) playing with Red Smiley (right) in Anderson, Indiana in 1962.

Background information
- Born: Donald Wesley Reno; February 21, 1926; Spartanburg, South Carolina, U.S.
- Origin: Haywood County, North Carolina, U.S.
- Died: October 16, 1984 (aged 58) Charlottesville, Virginia, U.S.
- Genres: Bluegrass Music, Gospel Music, Country Gospel
- Occupation: Musician
- Instruments: 5-string banjo, acoustic guitar
- Years active: 1939–1984
- Labels: King, Starday, Dot, Monument, Jalyn, CMH, Rural Rhythm
- Website: Donreno.com

Donald Wesley Reno (February 21, 1926 – October 16, 1984) was an American bluegrass and country musician, best known as a pioneering banjo and guitar player who partnered with Red Smiley, and later with guitarist Bill Harrell.

== Life and career ==
Born in Spartanburg, South Carolina, United States, Don Reno grew up on a farm in Haywood County, North Carolina. He began learning acoustic guitar at the age of five after borrowing a neighbor's guitar, and not long after began learning banjo. In 1939, the 13-year-old Reno joined the Morris Brothers in performing at a local radio station.

He left one year later to join Arthur "Guitar Boogie" Smith, with whom he would years later record "Feudin' Banjos". In 1943, he received an offer from Bill Monroe to become a member of the Bluegrass Boys, but chose instead to enlist in the United States Army. Trained as a horse soldier at Fort Riley, Kansas, he was sent to the Pacific Theater to fight on foot. He eventually served in Merrill's Marauders and was wounded in action.

Influenced by old-time banjo player Snuffy Jenkins and others, Reno developed his own two finger "single-string" style, typically using either his index or middle finger along with his thumb, to pick a single string repeatedly, that allowed him to play scales and complicated fiddle tunes note-for-note. The Reno style encompasses much more than just single-string picking; double-stops, double-time picking, triple-pull offs—all of these, and other techniques make Reno's playing recognizable. According to his son, Don Wayne Reno, "My dad told me more than once that the reason he started his own style of banjo picking was this: When he came out of the service, many people said 'You sound just like Earl Scruggs.' He said that really bothered him considering he never played a banjo while he was in the service, and when he returned to the U.S., he continued to play in the style he had always played before."

Reno was also a major pioneer of flatpicking guitar. By 1946 he was regularly performing on the WSPA-FM station out of Spartanburg, South Carolina as a lead guitarist with different groups. Around this time he began giving guitar lessons to Hank Garland, and the two soon did twin guitar performances at the station. During the Reno and Smiley years, Reno would often switch from banjo to guitar especially on gospel songs, and fiddle tunes. One song Reno wrote "Country Boy Rock and Roll" considered to be the first bluegrass song to feature lead guitar as the main instrument. Reno would occasionally even play electric guitar during some performances in the 1950s. Reno continued playing guitar on and off during his time with Bill Harrell and recorded many guitar instrumentals during this time. Doc Watson was influenced by Reno's guitar playing, even saying during an interview the first time he heard someone play fiddle tunes on a guitar was Don Reno. Other accomplished guitarists including Clarence White and Joe Maphis were influenced by Reno's guitar style.

In 1948, Reno became a member of the Blue Grass Boys. Two years later, with Red Smiley, he formed Reno and Smiley and the Tennessee Cutups, a partnership that lasted fourteen years. Among their hits were "I'm Using My Bible For A Road Map", "I Wouldn't Change You If I Could" and "Don't Let Your Sweet Love Die". Included in this line-up was his son, Ronnie Reno, who played mandolin. Videos from those days are shown regularly on Ronnie's show on RFD-TV. In 1964, after the retirement of Red Smiley, Reno and guitarist Bill Harrell formed Reno & Harrell. Red Smiley joined Reno and Harrell in 1969, remaining with them until his death in 1972.

From 1964 until 1971, he also performed with Benny Martin. In the 1970s, he played with The Good Ol' Boys, composed of Frank Wakefield on mandolin, David Nelson on guitar, Chubby Wise on fiddle, and Pat Campbell on bass. Reno began performing with his sons Don Wayne and Dale in later years.

== Death ==
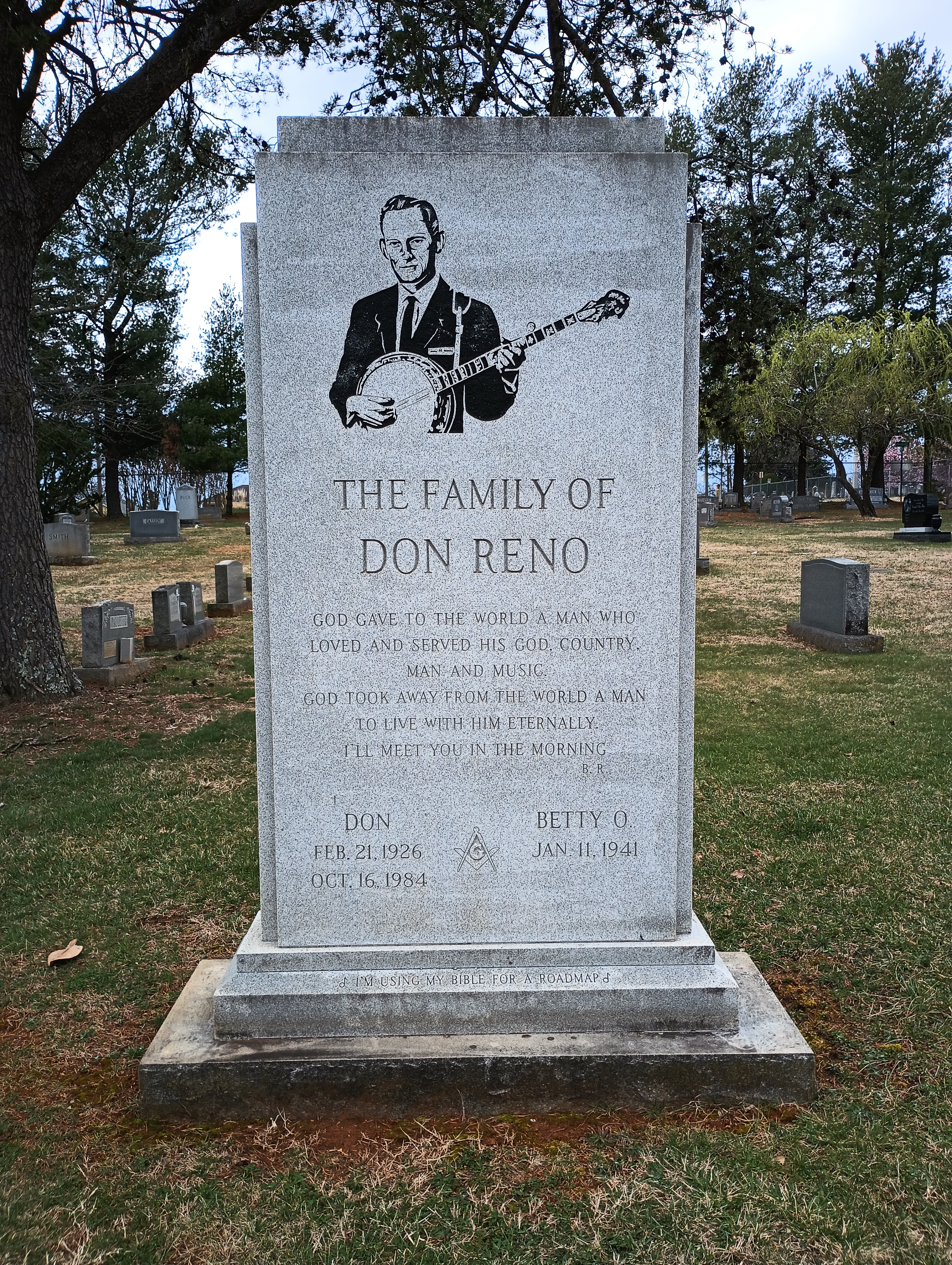
Gravestone of Don Reno and family at Spring Hill Cemetery, Lynchburg.

Don Reno died in 1984 aged 58, in Charlottesville, Virginia, of a "circulatory ailment." He is buried in Spring Hill Cemetery, Lynchburg, Virginia. In 1992, he was posthumously inducted into the International Bluegrass Music Hall of Honor and in 2020 he was inducted into the American Banjo Museum Hall of Fame under the Historical category.

== Discography ==
- Mr. 5-String (1965)
- A Song for Everyone (1966)
- Bluegrass Gospel Favorites (1967) — with Benny Martin; reissued on CD as Gospel Songs from Cabin Creek
- Don Reno & His Tennessee Cut-Ups (1966)
- Rural Rhythm Presents Don Reno & Bill Harrell with the Tennessee Cut-Ups (1967)
- A Variety of New Sacred Gospel Songs (1968)
- The Sensational Twin Banjos of Eddie Adcock and Don Reno (1968)
- All the Way to Reno (1969) — with Bill Harrell
- Fastest Five Strings Alive (1969)
- I'm Using My Bible Like a Roadmap (1969) — with Bill Harrell
- Bluegrass Favorites (1969) — with Bill Harrell
- The Most Requested Songs of Don Reno, Bill Harrell and the Tennessee Cut-Ups (1970)
- Letter Edged in Black (1971) — with Red Smiley and Bill Harrell
- Bluegrass Legends "Together" (1972) — with Charlie Moore
- Profile (1972) — with Red Smiley, Bill Harrell, Ronnie Reno and Charlie Moore
- Bluegrass on my Mind (1972) — with Bill Harrell
- Tally-Ho (1973) — with Bill Harrell
- Don Reno on Stage (1974)
- Rivers and Roads (1974) — with Bill Harrell
- Bi-Centennial Bluegrass (1975) — with Bill Harrell
- Spice of Life (1975) — with Bill Harrell
- Dear Old Dixie (1976) — with Bill Harrell
- Home in the Mountains (1977) — with Bill Harrell
- The Don Reno Story (1977) — with Bill Harrell
- Magnificent Bluegrass Band (1978)
- Feudin' Again (1979) — with Arthur "Guitar Boogie" Smith
- The Bluegrass Cardinals Live & On Stage (1980) — with 7 tracks by guests Don Reno & the Tennessee Cut-Ups
- 30th Anniversary Album (1980)
- The Original Dueling Banjos (1983) — with Arthur "Guitar Boogie" Smith
- Still Cutting Up (1983)
- Banjo Bonanza (1983) — with Bobby Thompson & The Cripple Creek Quartet
- Final Chapter (1986)
- Family and Friends (1989)
- The Golden Guitar of Don Reno (2000) — previously unreleased recordings made in November 1972 with Bill Harrell and Buck Ryan

== See also ==
- Keith style
- Scruggs style
