= The Unbroken Circle: The Musical Heritage of the Carter Family =

2004 various artists compilation album

Compilation album by various artists
- Released: August 24, 2004
- Recorded: 2003–2004
- Studio: Cash Cabin Studio (Hendersonville, Tennessee); Avatar (New York, New York) ("No Depression in Heaven"); Virginia, United States ("Little Moses" and "Hold Fast to the Right"); Pedernales Recording (Spicewood, Texas) ("You Are My Flower")
- Genre: Country music
- Length: 51:58
- Language: English
- Label: Dualtone
- Producer: John Carter Cash; Sheryl Crow ("No Depression in Heaven")

The Unbroken Circle: The Musical Heritage of the Carter Family is a 2004 compilation album featuring various artists performing the work of country music pioneers The Carter Family.

== Recording and release ==
The album was assembled and produced by John Carter Cash, shortly after the 2003 deaths of June Carter Cash and Johnny Cash. The compilation includes a track from the former's sessions for Wildwood Flower, as well as Johnny Cash's final recording.

== Reception ==
The editorial staff at AllMusic Guide gave the compilation three out of five stars, with reviewer Ronnie D. Lankford, Jr., writing that the first several tracks are low points, but that several subsequent recordings are high quality, particularly Marty Stuart's cover of "Never Let the Devil Get the Upper Hand of You" and the version of "Little Moses" on this album that "sounds more old-time than the Carter Family". PopMatters noted that this is "as good as a tribute album can be", commenting on the quality of John Carter Cash's musical direction, the album packaging, and sums up the assessment as "a reverent, well-executed, at times excellent, at times flawed, but always enjoyable, tribute album".

== Track listing ==
All songs written by A. P. Carter

1. "Worried Man Blues" by George Jones – 3:12
2. "No Depression in Heaven" by Sheryl Crow – 3:21
3. "On the Sea of Galilee" by Emmylou Harris featuring The Peasall Sisters – 3:17
4. "Engine One-Forty-Three" by Johnny Cash – 3:39
5. "Never Let the Devil Get the Upper Hand of You" by Marty Stuart & His Fabulous Superlatives – 4:51
6. "Little Moses" by Janette Carter and Joe Carter – 2:19
7. "Black Jack David" by Norman Blake and Nancy Blake featuring Tim O’Brien – 2:56
8. "Bear Creek Blues" by John Prine – 4:24
9. "You Are My Flower" by Willie Nelson – 2:39
10. "Single Girl, Married Girl" by Shawn Colvin featuring Earl Scruggs and Randy Scruggs – 2:20
11. "Will My Mother Know Me There?" by The Whites featuring Ricky Skaggs – 3:04
12. "The Winding Stream" by Rosanne Cash – 4:31
13. "Rambling Boy" by The Del McCoury Band – 4:24
14. "Hold Fast to the Right" by June Carter Cash – 2:55
15. "Gold Watch and Chain" by The Nitty Gritty Dirt Band featuring Kris Kristofferson – 4:06

== Personnel ==
Technical personnel

- Wayne Brezinka – art direction, layout, design, cover illustration
- John Carter Cash – compilation; production on all tracks, except "No Depression in Heaven"; art direction
- Jim DeMain – mastering at Yes Master
- David McClister – photography (except Shawn Colvin)
- Frank Ockenfels – photography of Shawn Colvin
- Mark Petaccia – assistant mixing
- Chuck Turner – engineering and mixing at Quad Studios, Nashville, Tennessee, United States, except for "Engine One-Forty-Three" (engineering only)

"Worried Man Blues"

- George Jones – vocals
- Laura Cash – fiddle
- Dennis Crouch – double bass
- Kenny Malone – membranophone
- Kayton Roberts – steel guitar
- Pete Wade – acoustic and electric guitar

"No Depression in Heaven"

- Sheryl Crow – lead vocals, acoustic guitar, production
- Larry Campbell – acoustic guitar, fiddle, and backing vocals
- Roy Hendrickson – engineering
- Tim Smith – bass guitar
- Peter Stroud – acoustic guitar

"On the Sea of Galilee"

- Emmylou Harris – acoustic guitar, lead vocals
- Sam Bush – mandolin
- Billy Linneman – double bass
- The Peasall Sisters – vocals
- Randy Scruggs – acoustic guitar

"Engine One-Forty-Three"

- Johnny Cash – vocals
- John Carter Cash – production, mixing
- Laura Cash – fiddle
- Dennis Crouch – double bass
- Pat McLaughlin – mandolin
- Randy Scruggs – acoustic guitar

"Never Let the Devil Get the Upper Hand of You"

- Marty Stuart – electric sitar, mandolin, and lead vocals
- Laura Cash – fiddle
- Brian Glenn – bass guitar and backing vocals
- Harry Stinson – membranophone and backing vocals
- Kenny Vaughan – acoustic guitar

"Little Moses"

- Janette Carter – autoharp and vocals
- Joe Carter – vocals
- Laura Cash – acoustic guitar
- Dale Jett – acoustic guitar

"Black Jack David"

- Nancy Blake – acoustic guitar, cello, and vocals
- Norman Blake – acoustic guitar and vocals
- John Carter Cash – autoharp
- Laura Cash – fiddle
- Tim O’Brien – bouzouki and vocals

"Bear Creek Blues"

- John Prine – acoustic guitar and lead vocals
- Dave Jacques – bass guitar
- Pat McLaughlin – acoustic guitar, mandolin, and percussion
- Jason Wilber – electric guitar and backing vocals

"You Are My Flower"

- Willie Nelson – acoustic guitar and vocals
- Boo McCleod – assistant engineering

"Single Girl, Married Girl"

- Shawn Colvin – vocals
- Fred Remmert – engineering
- Earl Scruggs – acoustic guitar
- Randy Scruggs – acoustic guitar

"Will My Mother Know Me There?"

- Buck White – mandolin, piano, vocals
- Cheryl White – acoustic guitar and vocals
- Sharon White – acoustic guitar and vocals
- Ricky Skaggs – acoustic guitar

"The Winding Stream"

- Rosanne Cash – lead vocals
- Lorrie Carter Bennett – backing vocals
- Dennis Crouch – double bass
- Pat McLaughlin – mandolin
- Randy Scruggs – acoustic guitar

"Rambling Boy"

- Mike Bub – double bass
- Jason Carter – fiddle
- Del McCoury – acoustic guitar and lead vocals
- Rob McCoury – banjo
- Ronnie McCoury – mandolin and background vocals

"Hold Fast to the Right"

- June Carter Cash – lead vocals
- Norman Blake – acoustic guitar
- Johnny Cash – backing vocals
- Laura Cash – acoustic guitar

"Gold Watch and Chain"

- Bob Carpenter – accordion and background vocals
- Jimmie Fadden – harmonica and membranophone
- Jeff Hanna – acoustic guitar and vocals
- Jimmy Ibbotson – electric bass guitar and vocals
- John McEuen – acoustic guitar and banjo
- Kris Kristofferson – acoustic guitar and vocals

== See also ==
- List of 2004 albums
