= Ezra Carter =

American music group manager

- Born: Ezra J. Carter; October 21, 1898; Maces Spring, Virginia
- Died: January 22, 1975 (aged 76)
- Other name: Eck Carter
- Occupation: Manager
- Known for: Member of the Carter Family
- Spouse: Maybelle Addington (m. 1926)
- Children: Helen Carter; June Carter; Anita Carter

Ezra J. Carter (also known as Eck Carter; October 21, 1898 – January 22, 1975) was a member of the Carter Family of Virginia. Ezra Carter managed the Carter Family, a traditional American folk music group that recorded between 1927 and 1956. He was the husband of Maybelle Addington Carter (1909–1978), brother of A.P. Carter (1891–1960) and father of Helen Carter (1927–1998), June Carter (1929–2003) and Anita Carter (1933–1999).

Carter was born on October 21, 1898, in Maces Spring, and married Maybelle Addington in 1926. In 1927, he drove the Carter Family to the original Bristol Sessions recordings in his car. These sessions were notable for being among the first recordings of Appalachian country music. After retiring as a railroad postal worker and following the divorce of A.P. Carter and Sara Carter, he became the manager of the Carter Family group and directed their stage performances. When the Grand Ole Opry invited the family to perform regularly, they requested that Chet Atkins not be included in the group. Ezra insisted that Atkins remain. Carter was also responsible for constructing a dam and bringing the first electricity to Poor Valley, Virginia. He died on January 22, 1975, and was buried in Hendersonville, Tennessee. His former home in Maces Spring, Scott County, Virginia, now known as the Maybelle and Ezra Carter House, is listed on the National Register of Historic Places.
