= Joseph Dougherty Carter =

American musician (1927–2005)

Joe Carter
- Born: Joseph Dougherty Carter; February 27, 1927; Maces Spring, Virginia, U.S.
- Died: March 2, 2005 (aged 78) Hiltons, Virginia, U.S.
- Occupation: Musician
- Years active: 1939–1940, 1952–1956
- Labels: Acme Records

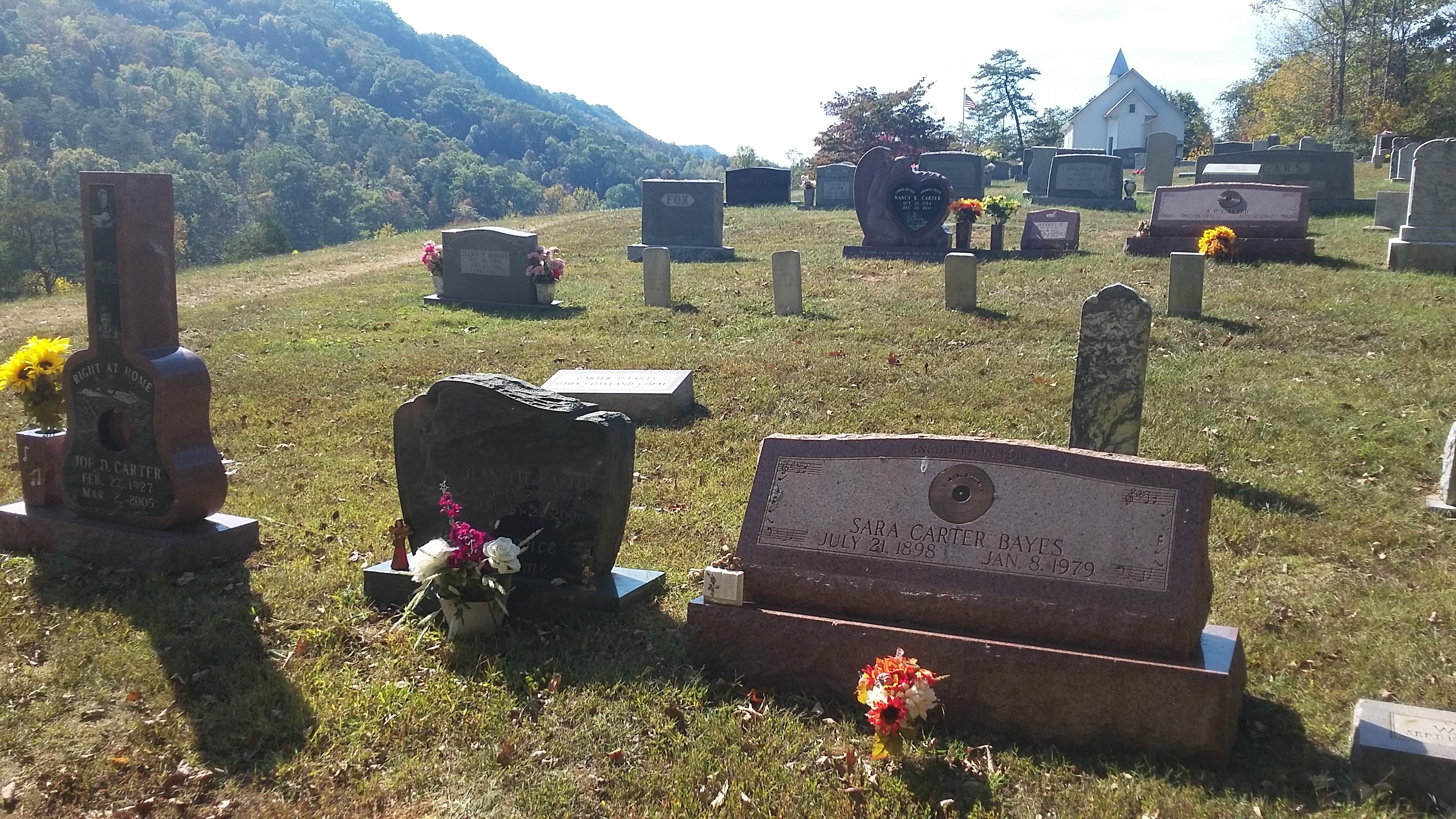
Grave of Joe Carter (left), and his sister, Janette, and Sara Carter Bayes at Mount Vernon United Methodist Church in Hiltons, Virginia

Joseph Dougherty "Joe" Carter (February 27, 1927 – March 2, 2005) was a member of the Carter Family, an American country/folk music group.

Carter was born in 1927 in Maces Spring, Virginia, several months before the Bristol Sessions, which eventually made his family famous. His father was Alvin Pleasant "A. P." Delaney Carter (1891–1960) and his mother was Sara Carter (1898–1979). Joe Carter performed with the Carter family from 1939 to 1940 on Border Radio and with his sister Janette and his parents Sara and A.P. Carter from 1952 till 1956 on a program called Acme Sessions. and performed again in the 1970s and later in his life. Carter served as a sailor during World War II and returned to Virginia after his service and worked in the construction industry, becoming a superintendent. He was active with the Carter Family Fold with his sister, Janette Carter. He died in 2005 and was buried at Mount Vernon United Methodist Church.
