= Janette Carter =

Member of the Carter Family (1923–2006)

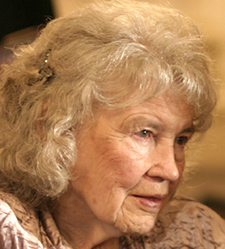
- Carter in 2005

Background information
- Born: July 2, 1923; Maces Spring, Virginia, U.S.
- Died: January 22, 2006 (aged 82) Kingsport, Tennessee, U.S.
- Genres: Gospel, country
- Instruments: Autoharp, vocals
- Years active: 1939–1940, 1952–1956

Janette Carter (July 2, 1923 – January 22, 2006), daughter of musicians A.P. and Sara Carter, was an American musician involved in the preservation of Appalachian music.

Carter was born on July 2, 1923, in Maces Spring, Virginia. She and her brother Joe performed with their parents on a series of recordings for the Acme label. Janette and Joe later recorded material together consisting of works they had written and songs previously recorded by members of the Carter family.

In 1976, Carter and community members built an 880-seat amphitheater, the Carter Family Fold, beside the A. P. Carter Store which her father had operated after the Carter Family had disbanded as a musical group. The Carter Family Fold attracts more than 50,000 visitors a year. Carter performed there weekly, until shortly before she died.

Carter had three children with her first husband, James Jett: Donald William, Rita Janette, and James Delaney (Dale). She died on January 22, 2006, in Kingsport, Tennessee, after battling Parkinson's disease and other illnesses. She was buried next to her mother, Sara Carter Bayes, and her brother, Joe, at the Mount Vernon United Methodist Church Cemetery in Maces Spring.

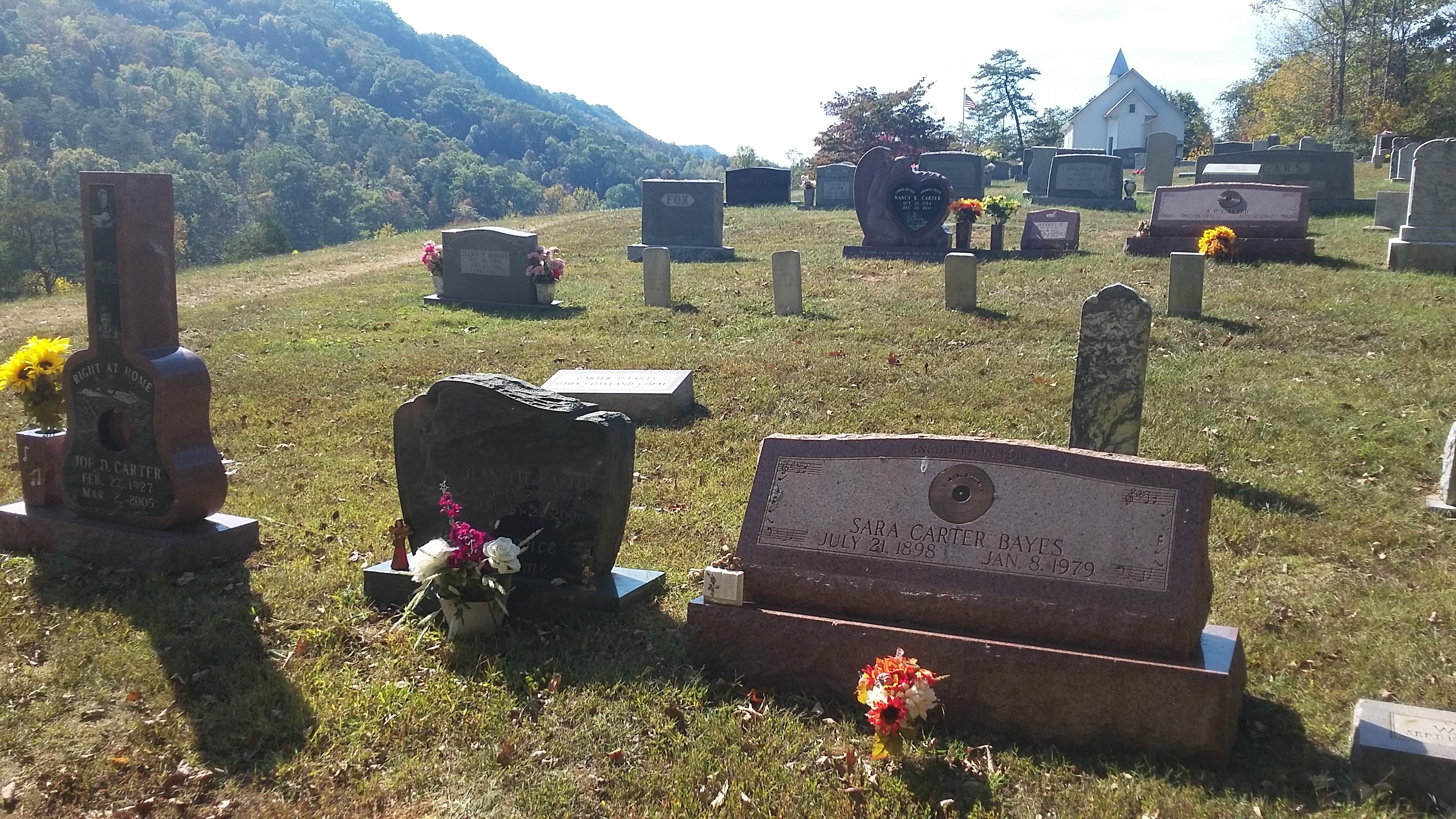
Grave of Janette Carter between her mother and brother, Joe

Carter is a recipient of a 2005 National Heritage Fellowship awarded by the National Endowment for the Arts, which is the United States' highest honor in the folk and traditional arts, in recognition for her lifelong advocacy for the performance and preservation of Appalachian music.
