= Sara Carter =

American country musician (1898–1979)

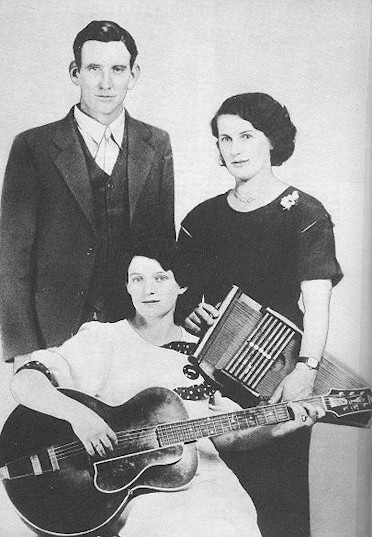
- Carter (holding the autoharp) with the rest of the Carter Family in 1927

Background information
- Born: Sara Elizabeth Dougherty; July 21, 1898; Copper Creek, Virginia, U.S.
- Died: January 8, 1979 (aged 80) Lodi, California, U.S.
- Genres: Country, folk, gospel
- Occupations: Singer-songwriter, musician
- Instruments: Vocals, autoharp, guitar, guitaro, banjo
- Years active: 1927–1971
- Labels: Victor, ARC, Decca
- Formerly of: Carter Family

Sara Elizabeth Carter (née Dougherty, later Bayes; July 21, 1898 – January 8, 1979) was an American country music musician, singer, and songwriter. Remembered mostly for her deep, distinctive, mature singing voice, she was the lead singer on most of the recordings of the historic Carter Family act in the 1920s and 1930s. In her earliest recordings her voice was pitched very high.

== Life and career ==
Born in Copper Creek, Virginia, the daughter of William Sevier Dougherty and Nancy Elizabeth Kilgore, at age 16 she married A. P. Carter on June 18, 1915; they divorced in 1936. They had three children: Gladys (Mrs. Millard), Janette (Mrs. Jett), and Joe.

In 1927, she and A. P. began performing as the Carter Family, perhaps the first commercial rural country music group. They were joined by her cousin, Maybelle, who was married to A. P.'s brother, Ezra Carter. Later, Sara married Coy Bayes, A. P.'s first cousin, and moved to California in 1943, and the original group disbanded. In the late 1940s, Maybelle began performing with her daughters Helen, June, and Anita as The Carter Sisters and Mother Maybelle (the act was renamed The Carter Family during the 1960s).

On Carter Family recordings, Sara is credited as author of the songs "Fifty Miles of Elbow Room" and "Keep on the Firing Line"; in truth she discovered these public domain songs when they were being sung at a Seventh-day Adventist church she visited.

RCA gave her songwriter credit, as it did A.P. Carter on his public domain discoveries. The Carter Family recordings of these tunes brought the songs worldwide fame. Sara wrote or co-wrote several other songs, including "My Foothills Home", "The Dying Soldier", "Lonesome Pine Special", "Farther On", and "Railroading on the Great Divide".

Sara reunited with Maybelle in 1966 for a Columbia Records album titled "An Historic Reunion," which was later re-issued on Bear Family Records, with additional songs, as "Sara and Maybelle Carter." They performed together during the folk music craze of the 1960s at the Newport Folk Festival. The duo were featured as guests in a late 1960s episode of the Wilburn Brothers television show, singing "Little Moses" and "As the Band Played Dixie". Following this period, Sara retired to California, although she and Maybelle remained close for the rest of their lives and Sara and Coy journeyed yearly from California to Virginia by car, pulling a travel trailer.

In the early 1970s, Sara and Maybelle reunited to appear on Johnny Cash's network television show and to perform together at the first annual A.P. Carter Memorial Festival in Hiltons, Virginia.

== Family tree ==
William Kilgore	Nancy Kilgore
Hugh J. Addington	Margaret E. Kilgore	Nancy E. Kilgore	William S. Dougherty
Ezra Carter	Maybelle Carter	A.P. Carter	Sara Carter	Coy Bayes
Helen Carter	Anita Carter	June Carter Cash	Johnny Cash	Gladys Carter	Janette Carter	Joe Carter
John Carter Cash

== Legacy ==
Carter was inducted as part of the Original Carter Family in the Country Music Hall of Fame in 1970, along with Bill Monroe. In 1993, her image appeared on a U.S. postage stamp honoring the Carter Family. In 2001 she was inducted into the International Bluegrass Music Hall of Honor.

On her 2008 album All I Intended to Be, Emmylou Harris includes the song "How She Could Sing the Wildwood Flower", co-written with Kate and Anna McGarrigle about the relationship between Sara and A.P., inspired by a documentary that the three of them saw on television.

== Death ==
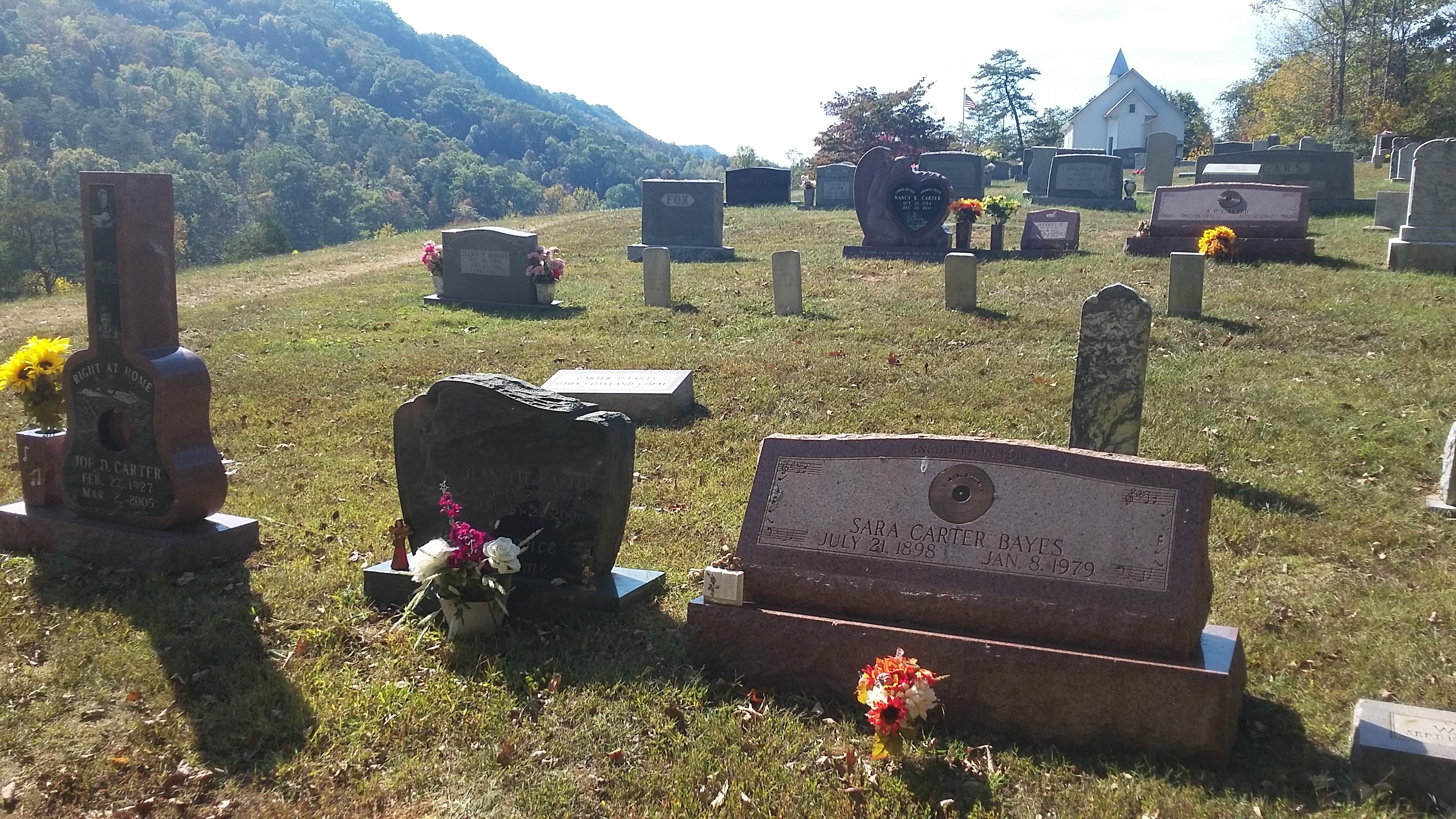
Grave of Sara Carter Bayes and children at Mount Vernon United Methodist Church at Hiltons, Virginia

Sara Carter died in Lodi, California, aged 80, and is interred in the Mt. Vernon United Methodist Church graveyard in Hiltons, Virginia. The A. P. and Sara Carter House, A. P. Carter Homeplace, A. P. Carter Store, Maybelle and Ezra Carter House, and Mt. Vernon Methodist Church are listed on the National Register of Historic Places as components of the Carter Family Thematic Resource.

== See also ==
- Carter Family

== Sources ==
- Wolfe, Charles (1998). "The Carter Family". In The Encyclopedia of Country Music. Paul Kingsbury, Editor. New York: Oxford University Press. pp. 84–5, 617.
