= Freeda Bolt =

American murder victim

Freeda Bolt (March 23, 1911 – December 14, 1929) was a murder victim from Floyd County, Virginia. Her murder inspired a ballad, "Young Freda Bolt", written by hymnodist Doc M. Shank in 1930 for The Floyd City Ramblers, later recorded by The Carter Family on June 8, 1938, in Charlotte, North Carolina for Decca Records.

== Murder ==
A senior in high school, Bolt had decided to elope with her lover, 20-year old Buren Harman, to Roanoke, possibly to be wed. Her parents did not hear from her for days, and offered $100 for any knowledge of her whereabouts. Sheriff D. P. Hylton (also known as Hilton) took Harman into custody. Initially denying that he had met Bolt on the evening prior to her disappearance or that they had made wedding plans, he eventually confessed to the murder. It happened along the road descending Bent Mountain. He dragged her body thirty yards off the side of the road and down the hill, hiding her beneath leaves and logs. The next morning, he returned to find Bolt still alive, whereupon he killed her. Bolt's body was discovered on December 19; it had been in the woods for six days before Harman's confession.

Harman led Sheriff Hylton along with Deputies Giles Harris and J. C. Anderson to the location of the body. A heavy cord was tied around Bolt's neck. County coroner Dr. G. A. Kolmer was called to the scene. In the evening, Bolt's body was taken to the Back Creek Orchard building owned by J. D. Willet, whose phone Hylton used to notify Bolt's parents. An autopsy was conducted in Salem the next morning, concluding that Bolt had been strangled.

The crime shocked the Bent Mountain community, and Floyd County. Hylton moved Harman to the jail in Roanoke for Harman's safety. Bolt was laid to rest five days before Christmas. The funeral was largely attended.

=== Trial ===
Harman's trial began on April 7 in Salem. Sixty witnesses took the stand over the course of several days in a packed courtroom. The defense alleged that she committed suicide, which the coroner disputed. The coroner also revealed that Bolt had been pregnant at the time of her death. The defense adopted a new strategy, providing evidence that the Harman family was plagued by insanity, imbecility, and epilepsy. Expert testimony from Dr. L. G. Pedigo showed that Harman suffered from epileptic insanity to such a degree that it rendered him with the mental capacity of a twelve-year-old. Pedigo told the court, "He is mentally unsound. He is below par mentally to start with, and he is so far abnormal that, under any excitement, or irritation, or provocation, his impulses and passions would get beyond any self-control he has left." A distant cousin of Harman corroborated the claim, explaining that members of the extended family had committed suicide, been sent to insane asylums, died of epileptic fits and had "imbecile children." Dr. J. S. DeJarnette, superintendent of Western State Hospital at Staunton, and Dr. John Bell, superintendent of the state's home for epileptics at Lynchburg, also examined Harman and affirmed the testimony of Pedigo and others.

After a trial lasting nine days, the jury returned a verdict of guilty, and Harman was sentenced to life in the state penitentiary. The judge spared Harman the death penalty as state law exempted that punishment for the "mentally deficient". A. G. Smith of The Roanoke Times described Harman's reaction:

The prisoner heard the verdict with the same immobile countenance which has characterized his demeanor throughout the trial . . . A slight movement of the upper lip followed a moment later by the faintest suggestion of a smile were noted.

Smith summarized the trial as "the most bitterly contested and sensational court battles ever witnessed in this section" and "probably the longest criminal trial a Roanoke County court has ever witnessed."

Harman was released after serving eighteen years in prison.

=== Aftermath ===
The murder helped launch the career of Jim Bishop. He recalled in 1977: "In interviews, I discovered she was a bright attractive young woman who faced life with joy and hope for the future . . . She had so much to live for."
