= Helen Carter =

American singer-songwriter

Background information
- Born: Helen Myrl Carter; September 12, 1927
- Origin: Maces Spring, Virginia, U.S.
- Died: June 2, 1998 (aged 70)
- Genre: Country
- Occupation: singer
- Instruments: Accordion; autoharp; guitar; piano; mandolin; vocals
- Years active: 1937–1998

Helen Myrl Carter Jones (September 12, 1927 – June 2, 1998) was an American country music singer. The eldest daughter of Maybelle Carter, she performed with her mother and her younger sisters, June Carter and Anita Carter, as a member of The Carter Sisters and Mother Maybelle, a pioneering all female country and folk music group. After the death of A.P. Carter in 1960, the group became known as The Carter Family.

Helen had a professional career in music that spanned 60 years. Many historians point to her 1937 radio debut as the beginning of her career but Janette Carter (Helen's cousin and daughter of original Carter Family band members A. P. and Sara Carter) recalled that she and Helen performed together at original Carter Family appearances at least two years prior to this date. As a child, Helen Carter played to some of the largest radio audiences in history by way of the powerful signals from the Mexican Border Stations of the 1930s and 1940s. Some of these stations could be heard throughout and even beyond the North American continent. After the breakup of the original Carter Family in 1943, Maybelle formed a group showcasing Helen and her younger sisters The group joined the cast of the Grand Ole Opry in 1950 securing Helen, June and Anita's place in country music history as being among the youngest Grand Ole Opry inductees ever. They were aged 22, 20 and 17 respectively. The Carters were on the first nationally televised network program to feature country music, The Kate Smith Show, and were among the first country music acts to tour behind the Iron Curtain in Czechoslovakia. They were given the "Favorite Country Group" award by the American Music Awards in 1973 and the "Gospel Act of the Year" award by the Music City News Awards in 1980.

Helen rarely sang lead in the Carter Family group and seemed content to focus her efforts on harmony and instrumental backing. She played a variety of instruments including accordion, autoharp, guitar, piano and mandolin. Many writers and historians list Helen Carter as the best overall musician and most talented songwriter among the Carter Sisters. Helen Carter was largely responsible for arranging the group's vocals. It was not uncommon for some songs to have multiple key changes as each group member sang a verse or as the entire group varied vocal combinations throughout the song. Another remarkable technique, difficult to describe and rarely recorded, had the group members solo-singing small segments of lyric lines or even portions of individual words. The effect was a seamless transfer of the lead vocal from one singer to the next. Sometimes the switch was so subtle that it could go unnoticed except to the most discerning ears of long-time fans. Often the group sang in a chorale type arrangement that was reminiscent of old-time gospel music singing. In this style the various lead vocals were woven throughout the song and changed unpredictably. A harmony voice could be thrust into the lead vocal within fractions of a second and then fade into the background just as quickly a short time later. Helen Carter was also widely regarded as the Carter Sister most in touch with the group's rich musical tradition and the one most dedicated to its preservation. Along with her mother, Maybelle Carter, Helen Carter was recorded by the Smithsonian Institution in 1975.

== Solo career ==
Helen pursued a solo career apart from the family. She recorded for a number of historically important independent labels such as Tennessee, Republic, Starday and Hickory. She had releases on major labels such as Columbia and Okeh as well. She recorded duets with such acts as The Willis Brothers, Johnny Bond, famed Grand Olde Opry announcer Grant Turner, and Wiley Barkdull (a singer who sounded a lot like Lefty Frizzell). In the 1960s, Helen teamed with Dolores "Tootsie" Dinning (of the Dinning Sisters and later The Nashville Edition) to form a short-lived group called the Blondettes that recorded for MGM. While many of Carter's solo recordings were favorites with loyal fans and always welcomed by concert goers, they did not have a great deal of commercial success. One likely reason for Helen's limited success as a solo artist may have been competition for radio air play with other members of her famous clan.

Throughout the recording career of the Carter Sisters & Mother Maybelle, much of the time, all four group members had individual recording contracts as well. Though each had her own style, it is of note that all members of the Carter Sisters & Mother Maybelle group (in various combinations) often sang and played on one another's solo recordings. Therefore, it was not unusual for the members' solo recordings to sound a lot like the group recordings.

Another possible reason for Helen Carter's limited success with her solo recordings may simply have been that she was ahead of her time in terms of what the conservative country music establishment was willing to accept. The 1950s was an era in which barriers were being broken by the likes of Kitty Wells. Yet, some of Helen's self-penned lyrics may have been deemed a bit risque:

From Unfit Mother: My neighbors said I was too wild, unfit to mother my own child

From Heart Full of Shame: I came to him in a veil of purest white, but you came to him as an angel of the night

From There Ain't no Future for Me: When you take me in your arms and snuggle me up tight, I can't help but wonder who you held last night

On occasion Helen Carter's writing would lure listeners into uncomfortable, dark situations:

From Satan's Child: ...he was tempted more than any man could stand...he thought he could save himself by taking Nelly's life...

From Is this My Destiny?: At night I toss and wonder why I must live while others die

From The Pickup: The morning papers told how she died. Jumped from a bridge; suicide

Helen's greatest commercial success came by way of her songwriting. She wrote for Acuff-Rose Music and Pamper Music, among other companies. Carter had at least three BMI Award winning titles during her songwriting career (entry for 'Carter, Helen' in BMI Songview: repertoire.bmi.com) Some of the better known titles she wrote or co-wrote include "The Kneeling Drunkard's Plea", "Wall to Wall Love", "Fast Boat to Sydney", "The First One to Love You", "We Lived it Up", "Rosanna's Going Wild", "Loving You Was Worth This Broken Heart", "Poor Old Heartsick Me", "Is This My Destiny?" and "What am I Supposed to Do?" Music acts as diverse as Skeeter Davis, Red Foley, Australian singer Dorothy Baker, the Byrds, Jan Howard, Wanda Jackson, Carl Butler, Ernest Ashworth, Johnny Cash, Linda Manning, Duane Eddy, the Knitters, Billy Grammer, Dawn Kight & the Casuals, Ray Price, Jimmie Dickens, Willie Nelson, Faron Young, Johnnie & Jack, the Osborne Brothers, Jean Shepard, the Cowslingers, the Louvin Brothers, the Browns, Ann-Margret, Chet Atkins, George Morgan, Waylon Jennings and Mark Dinning are among the more than sixty who have recorded her songs.

Helen Carter recorded two solo albums for Old Homestead Records and did guest spots on recordings by her niece Carlene Carter and Southern Gospel artist Jacky Jack White later in her life. Additionally there was an LP collaboration with old-time artists the Phipps Family. Helen also teamed with various members of the Carter Family for periodic recordings. In addition to the numerous recordings before Maybelle's death, Helen recorded with later versions of the Carter Family. In the 1980s a group featuring Helen (with two of her sons: David & Kevin; another son, Danny, occasionally performed with an earlier version of the group in the 1970s) and Anita (with her daughter Lorrie) recorded two albums and some singles for the Audiograph label. Helen, Anita and June (with one of her daughters, Carlene) recorded for Polygram/Mercury a few years later. June's other daughter, Rosie joined the group after Carlene's solo career began to gain momentum in the 1990s. On personal appearances it was not unusual for the lineup of the Carter Family to change. June's son John Carter Cash, and her granddaughter, Tiffany; as well as other relatives, sometimes performed with the group.

== Career with the Carter Family ==
With the Carter Sisters and Maybelle, Helen did experience chart success. During the 1960s and 1970s, the group charted a few albums (such as Country's First Family, 1976) and singles including "Traveling Minstrel Band", "The World Needs a Melody", and "A Song for Mama". Many were duet recordings with Helen Carter's brother-in-law Johnny Cash. It is also of note that the group was prominently featured on numerous Cash recordings but often went uncredited. Throughout their careers, in fact, all four group members recorded (as soloists and in various combinations) with such acts as Johnny Horton, Dolly Parton, the Wilburn Brothers, Boots Randolph, Grandpa Jones, Flatt & Scruggs, Carl Smith, Porter Wagoner, Merle Haggard, Darrell Glenn, Lefty Frizzell and many others. They were sought after for both their vocal and instrumental contributions in the studio. These collaborations produced a number of charting hits (and in at least one case a multi-million seller) along with various obscure B-sides and album cuts.

Helen Carter was a regular on Johnny Cash's network television program and on his TV specials. Along with other members of the Carter Family, Helen received a gold record for her participation in the Nitty Gritty Dirt Band's Will the Circle Be Unbroken, Vol. II. The group sang backup on two tracks from the album.

== Marriage and children ==
In 1950 Helen married Glenn Jones of Baxley, Georgia. After the family's move to the Nashville area, they lived in Madison, Hendersonville and Dickson, Tennessee. They had four sons (Kenneth Burton, Glenn Daniel, David Lawrence, and Kevin Carter Jones) and six grandchildren. They lost their son, Kenny, as the result of an auto accident, at 16 years old. At the time, Kenny had recently been signed as a recording artist for Monument Records.

== Death ==
Helen Carter died in 1998 at age 70.

== Legacy ==
Helen's song "Heart Full of Shame" was used in the 2003 movie Northfork. "Juke Box Blues", co-written with Maybelle, was used in the 2005 movie Walk the Line.

Helen Carter was portrayed by actress Janet McMahan in the musical Wildwood Flower: The June Carter Story.

In 2006, a forgotten set of recordings that Helen made with her sisters and a niece in 1991 was discovered and released to the public on Sphere Records. Unlike the majority of recordings made with her family, most tracks from the collection prominently featured Helen on lead vocal.

In 2009 Rosanne Cash released her acclaimed album The List. In publicity for the album Cash repeatedly discussed the impact that Helen Carter (her aunt through marriage) had on her as a musician, performer and as a songwriter. Cash also noted that Helen Carter spent hours teaching her to play guitar.

In the 2013 Lifetime Television Movie Ring of Fire Helen Carter was portrayed by young singers Emma Peasall and Hannah Peasall at different stages of her life.

== Partial discography ==
=== Solo singles: 1950s ===
- "I'm All Broke Out with Love"; "Fiddlin' Around"; "There's a Right Way, A Wrong Way"; "Thinking Tonight of My Blue Eyes", Tennessee Records
- "I Like my Loving Overtime", "Like All Get Out", "Unfit Mother", "You're Right but I Wish You Were Wrong", Okeh Records
- "Heart Full of Shame"; "No No It's Not So"; "Set the Wedding"; "Sweet Talking Man"; "There Ain't No Future for Me"; "What's to Become of Me Now", Hickory Records

=== Solo albums: Old Homestead records ===
This Is for You Mama (1979): lead and harmony vocals, guitar, mandolin, autoharp Songs include "Carter Guitar Medley", "Dark & Stormy Weather", "Fifty Miles of Elbow Room", "Helen's Mandolin Rag", "Hello Stranger", "I Ain't Gonna Work Tomorrow", "Is This My Destiny", "Lonesome Day", "Poor Wildwood Flower", "Red River Blues", "Tickling the Frets", "Winding Stream"

Clinch Mountain Memories (1993): lead vocals, guitar, autoharp Songs include "Clinch Mountain Love", "Poor Old Heartsick Me", "Why Do You Weep Dear Willow", "If You Were Losing Him to Me", "Kneeling Drunkard's Plea", "Mama Sang", "Meeting in the Air", "Hot Footin' It", "Lonesome Fiddle Blues", "No Distinction There", "You Are My Flower"

=== Collaborations on singles ===
==== 1950s ====
- He Made You for Me, I'd Like To, duet with Wiley Barkdull, Tennessee Records
- I Went to Your Wedding, duet with Johnny Bond, Columbia Records
- Counterfeit Kisses, and Sparrow in the Treetop, duets with Don Davis, Tennessee Records
- As Long as You Believe in Me, Duet with Bob Eaton, Tennessee Records
- Heaven's Decision, I'll Keep on Loving You, My Dearest & Best, and You Can't Stop Me from Dreaming, duets with Grant Turner, Tennessee Records/Republic Records

==== 1960s ====
- Little Butterfly, My Love is Many Things, with the Blondettes, MGM Records
- Release Me, duet with Bobby Sykes, Starday Records
- Wild Side of Life, with the Willis Brothers, Starday Records

==== 1970s or 1980s ====
Way Worn Traveler, duet with Johnny Cash, Columbia Records

=== Collaborations on albums ===
- Appalachian Pride (Solo album by June Carter). Helen plays accordion and sings harmony on some songs. (Columbia Records, 1975)
- Hills of Home (Phipps Family with Helen Carter). Helen sings lead on Walking in the King's Highway. She sings or sings/plays guitar on several other songs. (Mountain Eagle Records, 1980)
- Southern Songbook (Jacky Jack White with the Carter Sisters). Helen sings lead on Mary's Heart, Martha's Hands and sings harmony on some other songs. (Buffalo Run Records, 1996)

=== Selected examples of Carter Family recordings featuring Helen ===
==== 1940s and 1950s: RCA Records ====
Helen plays accordion on most of the recordings. She sings lead on "Willow Won't You Weep for Me". A partial family collaboration with Chet Atkins titled "Under the Hickory Nut Tree" features Helen's singing.

==== 1960s: Liberty Records ====
Helen sings lead on "Just Another Broken Heart" from the Carter Family Album. She and Maybelle duet on other tracks.

==== 1960s: Columbia Records ====
Helen shares lead vocals with June on "Poor Old Heartsick Me" from the Best of the Carter Family album.

==== 1970s: Columbia Records ====
Helen shares lead vocals with June on "In the Pines" from the Country's First Family album. She shares lead vocals with Anita on "2001 Ballad to the Future" and "Take Me Home Country Roads" from the album Traveling Minstrel Band. Helen sings lead on "Let Me Be There" and "Where No One Stands Alone" on the Three Generations album.

==== 1980s: Audiograph Records ====
From the album Audiograph Alive, Helen sings lead and plays guitar on "Wildwood Flower". On the album "Breaking Tradition", she sings lead on Loving Me on His Mind.

==== 1980s: Polygram Records ====
Helen shares lead vocals on some songs, and her guitar work is featured heavily on many titles from the album Wildwood Flower. According to taped interviews with various members of the Carter Family, the act recorded at least 30 other songs during these sessions. This material has not been released.

== Selected songwriter discography ==
Song title	Artist	Peak chart position & year	Notes
Poor Old Heartsick Me	Margie Bowes	#10, 1959	
Loving You (Was Worth this Broken Heart)	Bob Gallion	#7, 1961	
Wall to Wall Love	Bob Gallion	#5, 1962	co-written with June Carter
What Am I Supposed to Do?	Ann-Margret	#19, 1962	
He Made You for Me	Webb Pierce, Kitty Wells	#44, 1964	co-written with June Carter
I'm Gonna Leave You	Anita Carter	#44, 1966	co-written with Anita Carter
Rosanna's Going Wild	Johnny Cash	#2, 1968	co-written with Anita Carter & June Carter
A Song to Mama	Carter Family	#37, 1971	co-written with June Carter & Glenn Jones
