= Carter Family =

Traditional American folk music group

The Carter Family
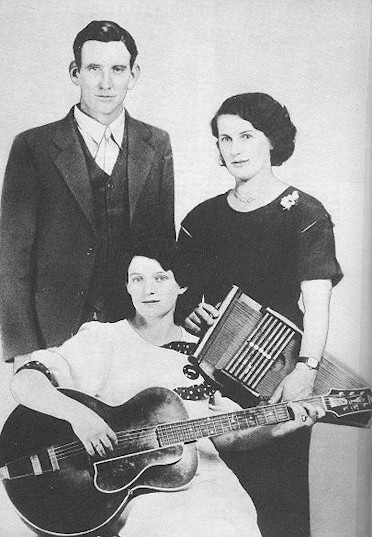
- A. P., Maybelle, and Sara Carter (L–R) in 1927

Background information
- Origin: Maces Spring, Virginia, U.S.
- Genres: Country; folk; blues; gospel; Old-Time
- Years active: 1927–1956
- Labels: Bluebird; Decca; RCA Victor; Vocalion; Montgomery Ward Records
- Members: A. P. Carter; Ezra Carter; Sara Carter; Maybelle Carter
- Past members: Helen Carter; Anita Carter; June Carter Cash; Janette Carter; Joe Carter; Dale Jett Carter; John Carter Cash

The Carter Family was an American folk music group that recorded and performed between 1927 and 1956. Regarded as one of the most important music acts of the early 20th century, they had a profound influence on the development of bluegrass, country, southern gospel, pop, and rock, as well as the American folk revival in the 1960s.

They were the first vocal group to become country music stars, and were among the first groups to record commercially produced country music. Their first recordings were made in Bristol, Tennessee, for the Victor Talking Machine Company under producer Ralph Peer on August 1, 1927. This was the day before country singer Jimmie Rodgers made his initial recordings for Victor under Peer.

The original group consisted of Sara Carter, her husband A. P. Carter, and her sister-in-law Maybelle Carter. Maybelle was Sara's first cousin, and was married to A. P.'s brother Ezra Carter (Eck). All three were born and raised in southwest Virginia. They were immersed in the tight harmonies of mountain gospel music and shape note singing. The latter dated to the early 19th century and revivals in the South.

Throughout the group's career, Sara Carter sang lead vocals and played rhythm guitar or autoharp. Maybelle sang harmony and played lead guitar. On some songs A. P. did not perform at all; on some songs he sang harmony and background vocals, and occasionally he sang lead. Maybelle's distinctive guitar-playing style became a hallmark of the group. Her Carter Scratch (a method for playing both lead and rhythm on the guitar) has become one of the most copied styles of guitar playing.

The success of the Carter Family's recordings of songs such as "Can the Circle Be Unbroken", "Wildwood Flower", and "Keep on the Sunny Side" made these songs country standards that were later inducted into the Grammy Hall of Fame. The Carter Family was inducted in 2005 after having been the first group inducted into the Country Music Hall of Fame in 1970. The group (in all its incarnations) recorded for a number of labels, including RCA Victor (and subsidiary label, Bluebird), ARC group, Columbia, Okeh and various imprint labels.

== History ==
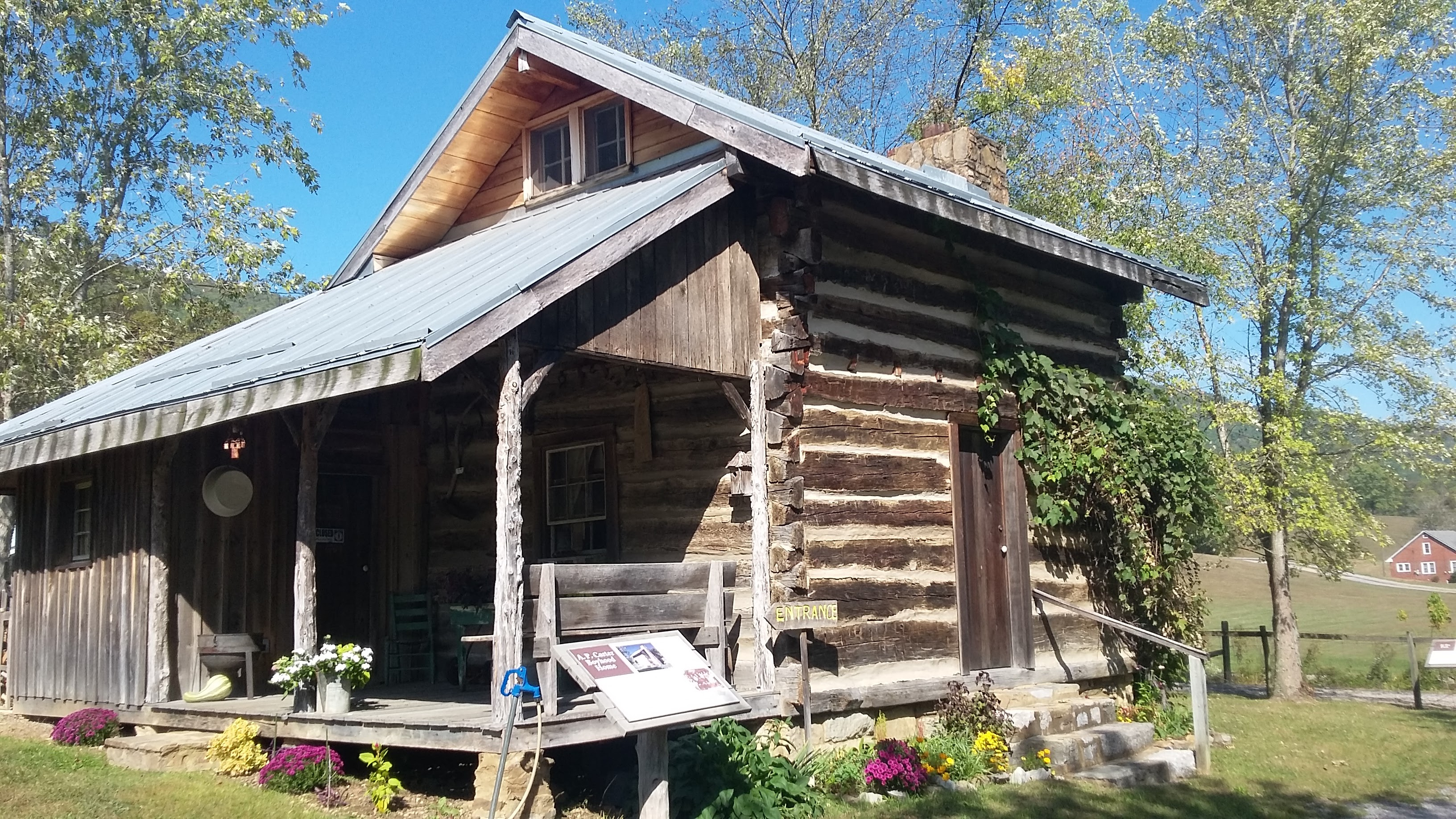
Birthplace log cabin of A.P. Carter at the Carter Fold at Maces Springs, Virginia near Hiltons, Virginia.

The Carter Family made their first recordings on August 1, 1927. The previous day, A.P. Carter had persuaded his wife Sara Carter and his sister-in-law Maybelle Carter to make the short 24-mile trip from Maces Spring, Virginia, to Bristol, Tennessee, to audition for record producer Ralph Peer. Peer was seeking new talent for the relatively embryonic recording industry. The initial sessions are part of what are now called the Bristol Sessions, which took place the empty second floor warehouse of the Taylor-Christian hat company. The band received $50 for each song recorded, plus a half-cent royalty on every copy sold of each song for which they had registered a copyright. On November 4, 1927, the Victor Talking Machine Company (later RCA Victor) released a double-sided 78 rpm record of the group performing "Wandering Boy" and "Poor Orphan Child". On December 2, 1928, Victor released "The Storms Are on the Ocean" / "Single Girl, Married Girl", which became very popular.

By the end of 1930, the Carter Family had sold 300,000 records in the United States. Realizing that he would benefit financially with each new song he collected and copyrighted, A.P. traveled around southwestern Virginia to find songs to record; he also composed new songs. In the early 1930s, he befriended Lesley "Esley" Riddle, a black guitar player from Kingsport, Tennessee. Lesley accompanied A.P. on his song-collecting trips. In June 1931, the Carters did a recording session in Benton, Kentucky, along with Jimmie Rodgers. In 1933, Maybelle met the Speer Family at a fair in Ceredo, West Virginia, fell in love with their signature sound, and asked them to tour with the Carter Family.

== Second generation ==
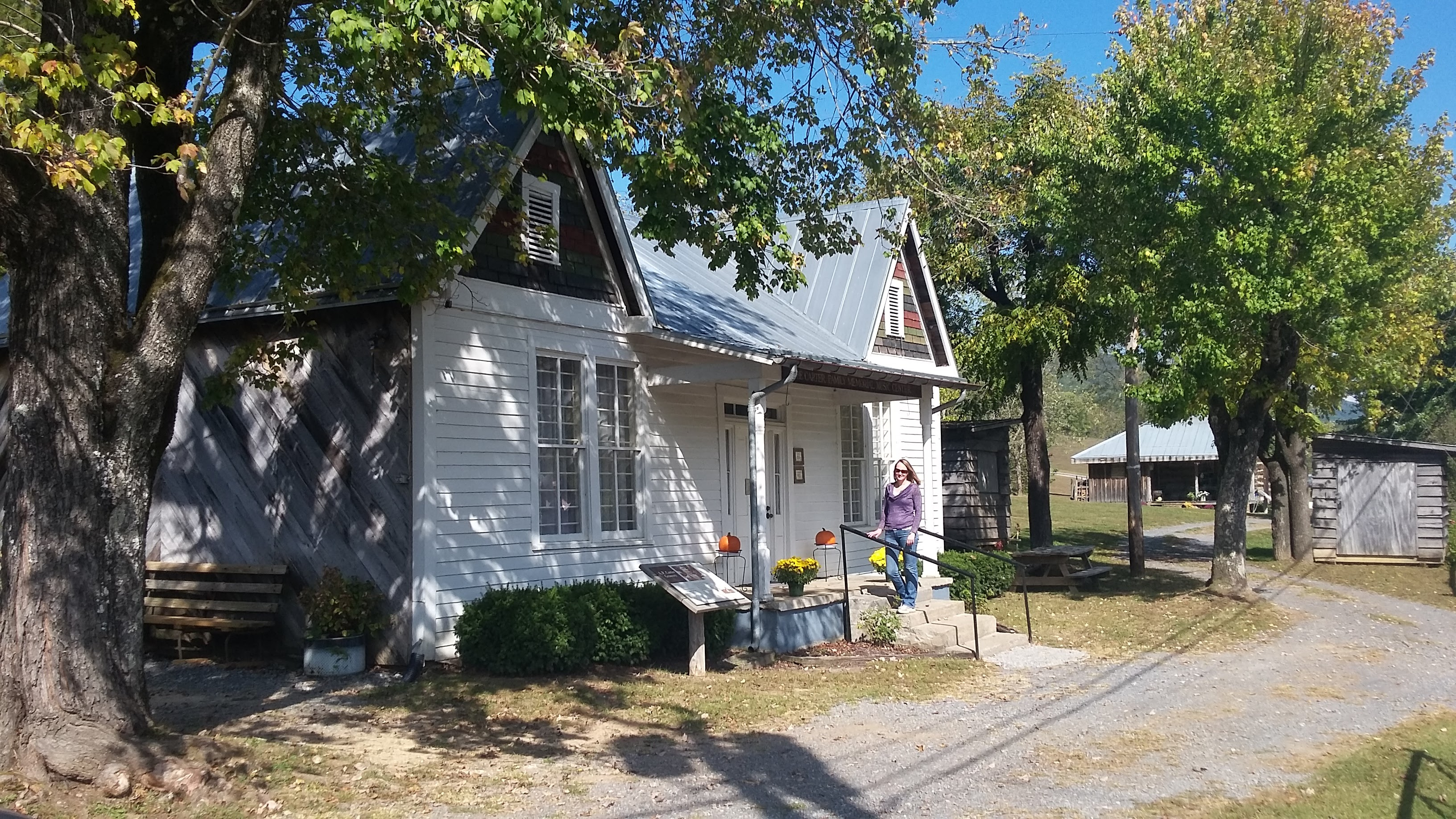
A.P. Carter General Store Museum at the Carter Fold at Maces Springs, Virginia near Hiltons, Virginia

The family spent time in their final years from 1938-1941 in Texas, where they had a twice-daily program on the border radio station XERA (later XERF) in Villa Acuña (now Ciudad Acuña, Mexico), across the border from Del Rio, Texas.

In the 1939–40 season, the children of A.P. and Sara (Janette and Joe Carter) and those of Maybelle (Helen, June, and Anita) joined the group for radio performances, by then in San Antonio, Texas. Here the programs were prerecorded and distributed to multiple border radio stations. (The children did not, however, perform on the group's records.) In the fall of 1942, the Carters moved their program to WBT radio in Charlotte, North Carolina, for a one-year contract. They occupied the sunrise slot, with the program airing between 5:15 and 6:15 a.m.

Sara divorced A.P. in 1939. After Sara married A.P.'s cousin, Coy Bayes, they moved to California. The Carter Family disbanded in 1944.

Maybelle continued to perform with her daughters Anita Carter, June Carter, and Helen Carter and recorded on 3 labels (RCA Victor, Columbia and Coronet) as "The Carter Sisters and Mother Maybelle" (sometimes billed as "The Carter Sisters" or "Maybelle Carter and the Carter Sisters" or "Mother Maybelle and the Carter Sisters"). In 1943, Maybelle Carter and her daughters, using the name "the Carter Sisters and Mother Maybelle" had a program on WRNL in Richmond, Virginia. Maybelle's brother, Hugh Jack (Doc) Addington Jr., and Carl McConnell, known as the Original Virginia Boys, also played music and sang on the radio show.

Chet Atkins, playing electric guitar, joined them in 1949 at WNOX radio in Knoxville, Tennessee. He moved with them in October 1949 to KWTO radio in Springfield, Missouri. When the Carters were offered a regular spot on the Grand Ole Opry, the Opry management did not want to include Atkins. However, Ezra Carter, their father and manager, insisted that Atkins come with them, as he was a part of their band now. Finally, the Opry management agreed, and Atkins went with them when they were hired by WSM and the Grand Ole Opry; their first day was May 29, 1950. Atkins worked with them when they did "personals" off and on for 8 years, but mostly on the live Grand Ole Opry performances. A.P., Sara, and their children Joe and Janette recorded 3 albums in the 1950s under the name of The A.P. Carter Family.

After the death of A.P. Carter in 1960, Mother Maybelle Carter and the Carter Sisters began using the name "the Carter Family" for their act during the 1960s and 1970s. Maybelle and Sara briefly reunited, recorded a reunion album (An Historic Reunion), and toured in the 1960s during the height of folk music's popularity.

A film documentary about the family, and in particular the second generation, Sunny Side of Life, was released in 1985.

In 1987, reunited sisters June Carter Cash and Helen and Anita Carter, along with June's daughter Carlene Carter, appeared as the Carter Family. They were featured on a 1987 television episode of Austin City Limits, along with June's husband Johnny Cash.

== Third generation ==
The Carter Family name was revived for a third time, under the name Carter Family III. It was a project of descendants of the original Carter Family, John Carter Cash (grandson of Maybelle Carter, son of June Carter Cash and Johnny Cash) and Dale Jett (grandson of A.P. and Sara Carter), along with John's wife Laura (Weber) Cash. They released their first album, Past & Present, in 2010.

Rosie Nix Adams, daughter of June Carter Cash, performed with the Carter Family in the 1970s as well as on The Johnny Cash Show in 1969.

Carlene Carter (granddaughter of Maybelle Carter) has had a successful career in country and rock music. She joined the 1987 Carter Family's second generation revival.

== Personnel ==
- A. P. Carter (1927–1944, 1952–1956)
- Maybelle Carter (1927–1978)
- Sara Carter (1927–1944, 1952–1956, 1960–1971)
- Janette Carter (1939–1940, 1952–1956)
- Helen Carter (1939–1940, 1944–1996)
- June Carter Cash (1939–1940, 1944–1969, 1971–1996)
- Anita Carter (1939–1940, 1944–1996)
- Joe Carter (1952–1956)
- John Carter Cash (2012–present)
- Dale Jett (2012–present)
- Carlene Carter (1987–present)
- Laura Cash (2012–2016)

== Extended family ==
June Carter and her sisters were distant cousins of U.S. president Jimmy Carter.

Cash Carter family tree

William Sevier Dougherty | Nancy Elizabeth Kilgore | Robert C. Carter | Mollie Arvell Bays | Margaret S. Kilgore | Hugh Jackson Addington
Sara Carter | A. P. Carter | Ezra J. Carter | Maybelle Carter
Gladys Carter | Janette Carter | Joe Carter | Helen Carter | Anita Carter
Vivian Liberto | Johnny Cash | June Carter Cash | Carl Smith
Edwin "Rip" Nix
Rosanne Cash | Kathleen Cash | Cindy Cash | Tara Cash | John Carter Cash | Rosie Nix Adams | Carlene Carter | Nick Lowe
Joseph Breen

== Musical style ==
As important to country music as the family's repertoire of songs was Maybelle's guitar playing. She developed her innovative guitar technique largely in isolation; her style is today widely known as the "Carter scratch" or "Carter Family picking". While Maybelle did use a flatpick on occasion, her major method of guitar playing was the use of her thumb (with a thumbpick) along with one or two fingers. What her guitar style accomplished was to allow her to play melody lines (on the low strings of the guitar) while still maintaining rhythm using her fingers, brushing across the higher strings. Nicholas Dawidoff described their style as “wistfully melodic."

The Illustrated Encyclopedia of Rock described their music as having simple harmonies and unique guitar-based arrangements. Before the Carter family's recordings, the guitar was rarely used as a lead or solo instrument among musicians. Maybelle's interweaving of a melodic line on the bass strings with intermittent strums is now a staple of steel string guitar technique. Flatpickers such as Doc Watson, Clarence White and Norman Blake took flatpicking to a higher technical level, but all acknowledge Maybelle's playing as their inspiration.

It has been noted that "by the end of the twenties, Maybelle Carter scratch ... was the most widely imitated guitar style in music. Nobody did as much to popularize the guitar, because from the beginning, her playing was distinctive as any voice."

— quoted in The Bristol Sessions: Writings About the Big Bang of Country Music (2005)

== Legacy ==
The Carter Family was the first group elected to the Country Music Hall of Fame in 1970 and were given the nickname "The First Family of Country Music". In 1993, the U.S. Postal Service issued a commemorative postage stamp honoring A.P., Sara, and Maybelle. The Grammy Hall of Fame inducted multiple songs including "Can the Circle Be Unbroken" in 1998, "Wildwood Flower" in 1999, and "Keep on the Sunny Side" in 2006. In 2001, the group was inducted into the International Bluegrass Music Hall of Fame. In 2005, the group received the Grammy Lifetime Achievement Award.

Keep on the Sunny Side, a musical play chronicling the Carter Family's rise to stardom, premiered at the Barter Theatre in Abingdon, Virginia, in 2001. Written by Douglas Pote, the play enjoyed a multiyear run, a national tour spanning 23 states, and an original cast recording; the Barter has also mounted revivals.

Renewed attention to the Carter Family tune "When I'm Gone" occurred after several covers performed a cappella with a cup used to provide percussion, as in the cup game and dubbed the Cups song, went viral and culminated with a short performance in the movie Pitch Perfect. Afterwards it was released as a single by Anna Kendrick.

The A. P. and Sara Carter House, A. P. Carter Homeplace, A. P. Carter Store, Maybelle and Ezra Carter House, and Mt. Vernon Methodist Church are listed on the National Register of Historic Places as components of the Carter Family Thematic Resource.

In 2017, the Carter Family's story was told in the award-winning documentary series American Epic. The film featured unseen film footage of The Carter Family performing and being interviewed, and radically improved restorations of their 1920s recordings. Director Bernard MacMahon commented that "we first came to the Carters through their records, but one of the other things that struck us about them is that they were involved in both of the main waves of America hearing itself for the first time. They made their first impact in that early wave of rural recordings, and then the next stage was the arrival of radio, and in the late 1930s, they went to Texas and were on XERA, a border station based in Mexico that could be heard all over the central and western United States." The Carter Family's story was profiled in the accompanying book, American Epic: The First Time America Heard Itself.

== Discography ==
Selected 78 rpm records: The Carter Family's career predated any sort of best-selling chart of country music records. (Billboard did not have a country best sellers chart until 1944.) Below is a select list of their 78 rpm releases.

Bluebird Records
- "Anchored in Love"
- "I'll Be All Smiles Tonight"
- "Keep on the Sunny Side"
- "Little Moses"
- "Mid the Green Fields of Virginia"
- "My Clinch Mountain Home"
- "Picture on the Wall"
- "Wabash Cannonball"
- "Wildwood Flower"
- "Worried Man Blues"

Victor Records

- "Bury Me Beneath the Willow"
- "Foggy Mountain Top"
- "Gold Watch and Chain"
- "I'm Thinking Tonight of My Blue Eyes"
- "Keep on the Firing Line"
- "My Old Cottage Home"
- "On the Sea of Gallee"
- "The Church in the Wildwood"
- "The Storms are on the Ocean"

Montgomery Ward Records

- "Lonesome Pine Special"
- "Two Sweethearts"
- "Where We'll Never Grow Old"

Decca Records

- "Coal Miner Blues"
- "Hello Stranger"
- "My Dixie Darling"
- "You Are My Flower"
- "Young Freeda Bolt"

Vocalion Records

- "Broken Hearted Love"
- "Can the Circle Be Unbroken"

== General and cited references ==
- Will You Miss Me When I'm Gone?: The Carter Family and Their Legacy in American Music, Mark Zwonitzer with Charles Hirshberg, New York, Simon & Schuster, 2002
- In the Country of Country: A Journey to the Roots of American Music, Nicholas Dawidoff, Vintage Books, 1998. ISBN 0-375-70082-X
- Among My Klediments, June Carter Cash, Grand Rapids, MI, Zondervan, 1979. ISBN 0-310-38170-3
- Carter, James 'Jimmy' (1978). Public papers of the presidents of the United States: Jimmy Carter, 1977. Government Printing Office.
- Stars of Country Music: Uncle Dave Macon to Johnny Rodriguez, Bill C. Malone, Judith McCulloh, University of Illinois Press, 1975. ISBN 978-0-252-00527-5

Awards
| Preceded by Gram Parsons | AMA Presidents Award; 2004 | Succeeded by John Hartford |
