= Carter Family Fold =

Musical performance and concert venue in Virginia

Coordinates: 36.668384°N 82.413425°W

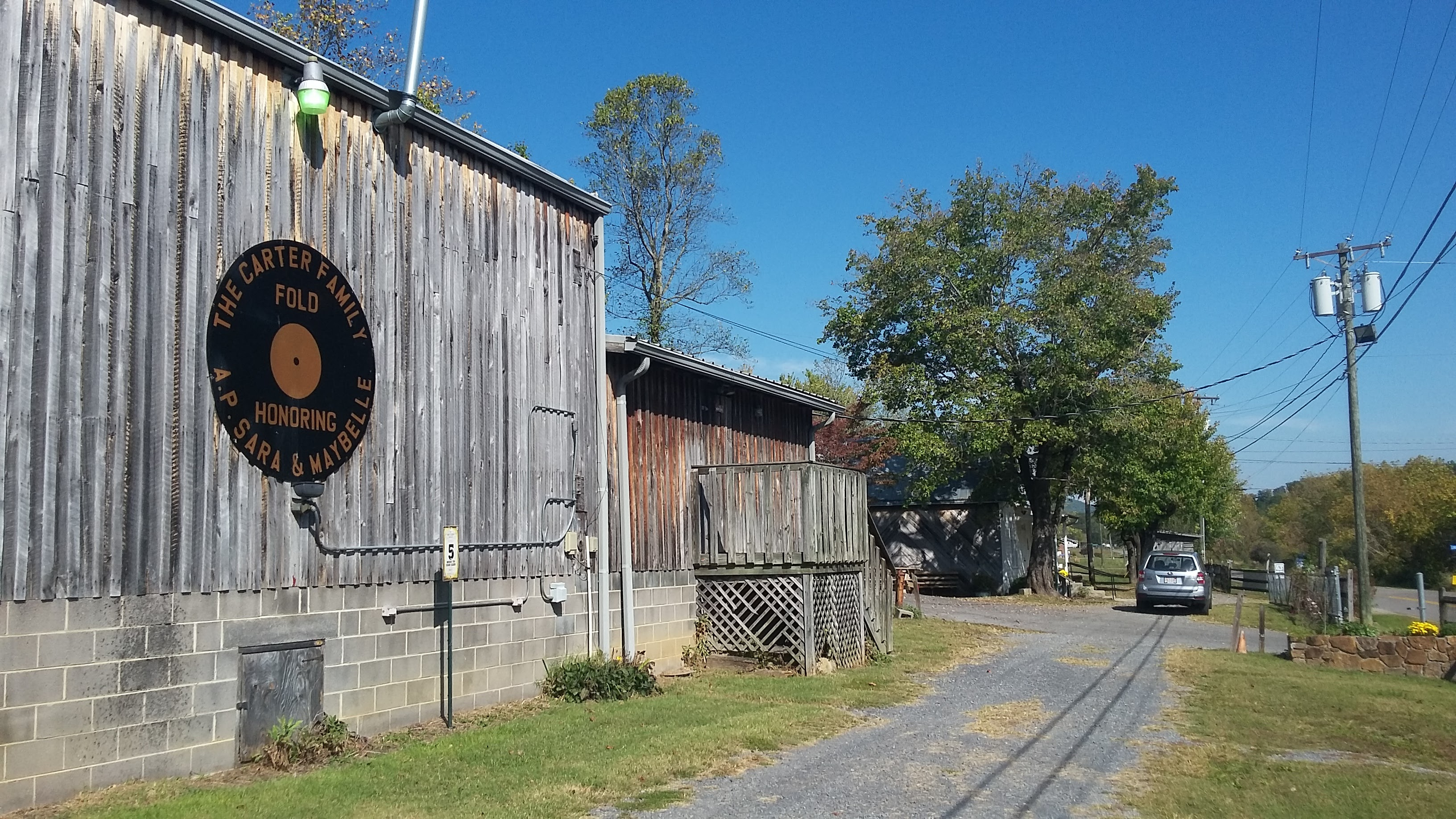
Carter Family Fold performance building at Maces Springs, Virginia now Hiltons, Virginia. It is adjacent to A.P. Carter's former General Store

The Carter Family Fold is a musical performance and concert venue located near Hiltons, Virginia. It is dedicated to the preservation and performance of old time country and bluegrass music. It is named in honor of the original Carter Family, A.P., Sara, and Maybelle, who were among the earliest recording artists in country music, with their first records on RCA Victor being released in 1927. The Fold was founded by Janette Carter, daughter of A.P. and Sara Carter, in 1979.

Janette Carter directed the center and served as master of ceremonies and performer at the Saturday night shows, often accompanied by her brother Joe, until her death in 2006. Her daughter, Rita Forrester, now fulfills that role.

The Fold presents weekly concerts. To stay true to musical preservation, no electric instruments are allowed (although this rule was often set aside for performances by singer Johnny Cash, a Carter family in-law). Smoking and drinking are prohibited in the venue.

Most of the participating performers at the Fold are not famous outside the communities of bluegrass and old-time country music. However, Johnny Cash performed at the Fold many times, and played his last concert there on July 5, 2003, a few months before his death. Cash's wife, June Carter Cash, was a daughter of Maybelle Carter. The Carter Sisters, Helen, June and Anita, performed at the Carter Fold many times also.

The Fold has a dance floor where Appalachian buckdancing and clogging, local forms of folk dancing, are seen weekly.

The concert venue, the "Fold," is the centerpiece of the Carter Family Memorial Music Center, Inc., a non-profit organization. This includes the 1880s cabin where A. P. Carter was born. The cabin was moved from its original location to a site next to the Fold, refurbished and rededicated before Janette Carter's death in 2006. Singer Marty Stuart, formerly a member of the Johnny Cash band, was instrumental in raising funds for the cabin's relocation and restoration.

The Carter Store, built by A. P. Carter and friends in the late 1940s and where he conducted daily business, is the site of the Carter Family Museum. This building was renovated in September, 2009. After the renovation, part of the large collection of Carter Family memorabilia that it had housed was moved back and redisplayed. A large crowd witnessed the rededication of the museum, which featured the cutting of a ceremonial red ribbon by Rita Forrester (daughter of Janette Carter) and Marty Stuart, who later performed at a special concert with his band, the Fabulous Superlatives.

A yearly Carter Family Memorial Festival is held in August at the Fold. In 2019, the Festival celebrated its 45th anniversary.

Also in 2009, the organization purchased property across the road from the Fold, which includes a three bedroom house that will be converted to office space. The accompanying grounds will be used for additional parking.

The Carter Family Fold and Museum is located in the Poor Valley region of southern Virginia at the foot of Clinch Mountain, in a settlement once known as Maces Spring. Maces Spring was home to A.P. and Sara Carter's family, as well as Ezra and Maybelle Carter and their daughters. Since Maces Spring no longer has a post office, it is considered part of the area of Hiltons.

Capacity at the Fold is 842 seats. Those wishing to attend a Saturday night show will usually find ample seating. However, for gospel and other special shows, it is advisable to request tickets well in advance.

== Controversy ==
In 2007, a controversy occurred concerning tapes of Carter Family performances. Dale Jett, son of Janette Carter, gave tapes of live performances of the Carter Family to the University of North Carolina's Southern Folklife Collection. The Carter Fold board called for the immediate return of the tapes, claiming that Jett (who was on the board) transferred the tapes without the board's knowledge. The board maintains that they own the tapes, and Jett had no right to move them. Jett's response was, "My only concern was to preserve them [the tapes] for the ages. And it should be the Fold’s [only concern]. The tapes don't belong to the Carter Fold, they belong to the people that are on them."

Jett's connections to the Carter Fold Board were severed. According to some sources, he was removed. According to other sources he resigned from the board. The University of North Carolina has since returned the tapes to the Carter Fold.

== See also ==
- List of music museums
- House of Cash
