= Guitaro =

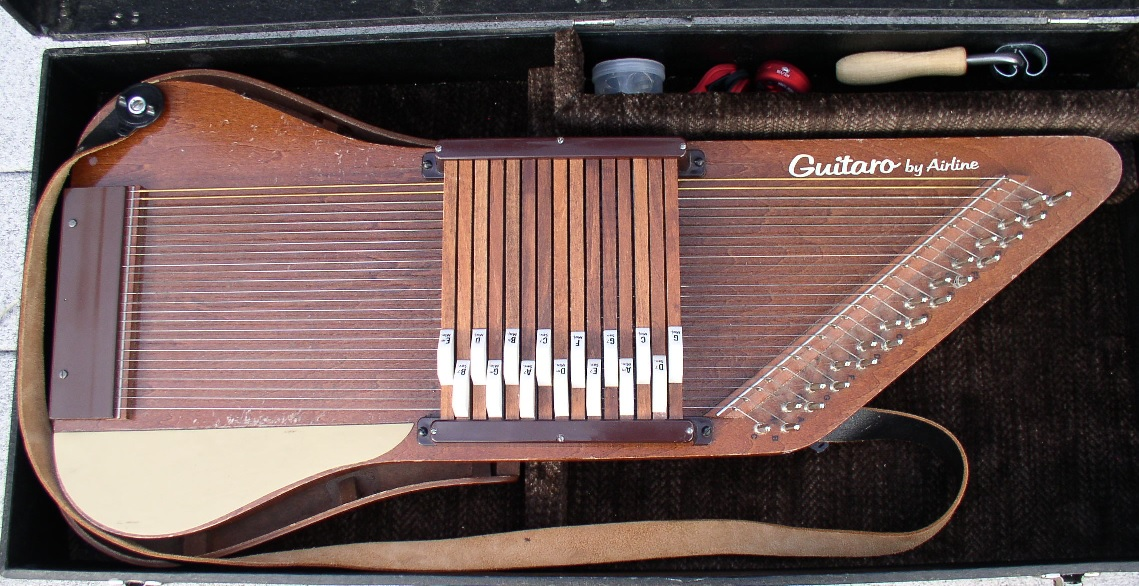

Builders
- Oscar Schmidt, Gibson

A Guitaro is a brand of autoharp constructed to be held like a guitar.

Oscar Schmidt-International, Inc. manufactured the Guitaro in the mid-1960s through the early 70s to take advantage of the guitar's popularity in the folk music revival of that era. (See Guitaro's US Patent #3,237,503, filed with the USPTO on June 17, 1963 and issued March 1, 1966.) Other sellers commonly sold it under their own brand names but most or all resellers still called it Guitaro.

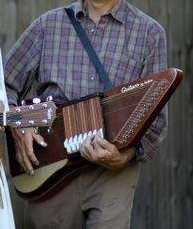
The Guitaro design allows use of a shoulder strap, much like a guitar. Note that finger picks are used by this player.

Due to Guitaro's long body, its 24 strings are necessarily longer than the 36 strings found on Oscar Schmidt-International's chromatic autoharps. Guitaro's resulting lower tones render it suitable for accompaniment, although playing melody with the help of its 15 chord bars may also be possible. Like the autoharp, either finger picks or a flat pick may be used to play Guitaro. Sara Carter played Guitaro in some performances; online videos show her playing one.

In 1964, Guitaro was introduced by Oscar Schmidt-International, Inc., along with the book "Make Wonderful Music with the Guitaro" (registered by the US Copyright Office on June 10, 1964). Designed by Glen Peterson and Henry Ruckner, Guitaro came in two models. The first, model #55, sports a resonator with a soundhole in back. Model #55B, having a soundhole in front without a resonator, continued to be manufactured after #55 was discontinued in the early 1970s. The year when #55B's manufacture ceased is currently unknown.

Maybelle Carter released a single called Strumming My Guitaro in 1964. The song was written by Harlan Howard and recorded in Oct. 1964 in Nashville TN. The single was released on Smash.

Oscar Schmidt featured Maybelle’s daughter Anita holding a guitario in publicity photos.
