= Lesley Riddle =

American singer-songwriter

Lesley "Esley" Riddle (June 13, 1905 – July 13, 1979) was an African American musician.

Riddle was born in Burnsville, North Carolina, United States. He grew up with his paternal grandparents near Kingsport, Tennessee, not far from the Virginia border.

While working as a young man at a cement plant, in August 1927, he tripped on an auger. The resulting injury entailed the amputation of his right leg at the knee. While he recovered, he took up the guitar, developing an innovative picking and slide technique. Soon, he was collaborating with other musicians from Sullivan and Scott counties, including Steve Tarter, Harry Gay, Brownie McGhee and John Henry Lyons.

In December 1928, Riddle met A.P. Carter, who founded the Carter Family country band. The Carter Family had become known for their recordings at the Bristol Sessions in August 1927. Riddle began to divide his time between Kingsport and the Carter home in Maces Spring, Virginia. Riddle and Carter embarked on song-collecting trips around the region: Riddle would act as a "human tape recorder," memorizing the melody while Carter gathered lyrics.

The Carter Family went on to record a number of songs that Riddle either composed or transmitted, including "Cannonball Blues," "Hello Stranger," "I Know What It Means To Be Lonesome," "Let the Church Roll On," "Bear Creek Blues," "March Winds Goin' Blow My Blues Away" and "Lonesome For You." Riddle's guitar technique made an impression on Maybelle Carter, and she incorporated elements of it into her style.

In 1937, Riddle got married and in 1942, moved to Rochester, New York. Soon he retired from music, and in 1945, he sold his guitar, remaining obscure for the next twenty years. In 1965, Mike Seeger, fresh from a collaboration with Maybelle Carter, tracked down Riddle and persuaded him to return to recording music. Over the next 13 years, Riddle and Seeger made a series of studio recordings, several of them compiled in the album "Step by Step", released in 1993. Riddle also made appearances at the Smithsonian Folk Festival and the Mariposa Folk Festival.

Riddle died in July 1979, in Asheville, North Carolina. In 1993, a selection from the sessions with Mike Seeger was released by Rounder Records as Step By Step: Lesley Riddle Meets The Carter Family: Blues, Country & Sacred Songs.

On July 31, 2009, a stage production about Riddle's life, including his time with and influence on the Carter Family, had its world premier at the Parkway Playhouse in Burnsville, North Carolina, Riddle's birthplace. The show featured biographical details of his life, plus versions of songs as he played them, and then again as the Carters played them. The production was called Esley: The Life and Music of Lesley Riddle, written by Jeff Douglas Messer, directed by Michael Lilly, and starring Jim Arrendell as Esley. In mid-2015, Parkway Playhouse revived the stage production of Esley with a new cast of actors, but still under the direction of Michael Lilly. Playwright Jeff Douglas Messer is currently working on a screenplay and novel based on the stage script.

In 2008, the Traditional Voices Group, a North Carolina organization with a mission partly to preserve and promote the memory of Lesley Riddle, began annual RiddleFest Concerts in Burnsville, North Carolina.
