= Maybelle and Ezra Carter House =

Historic house in Virginia, United States

- U.S. National Register of Historic Places
- Virginia Landmarks Register
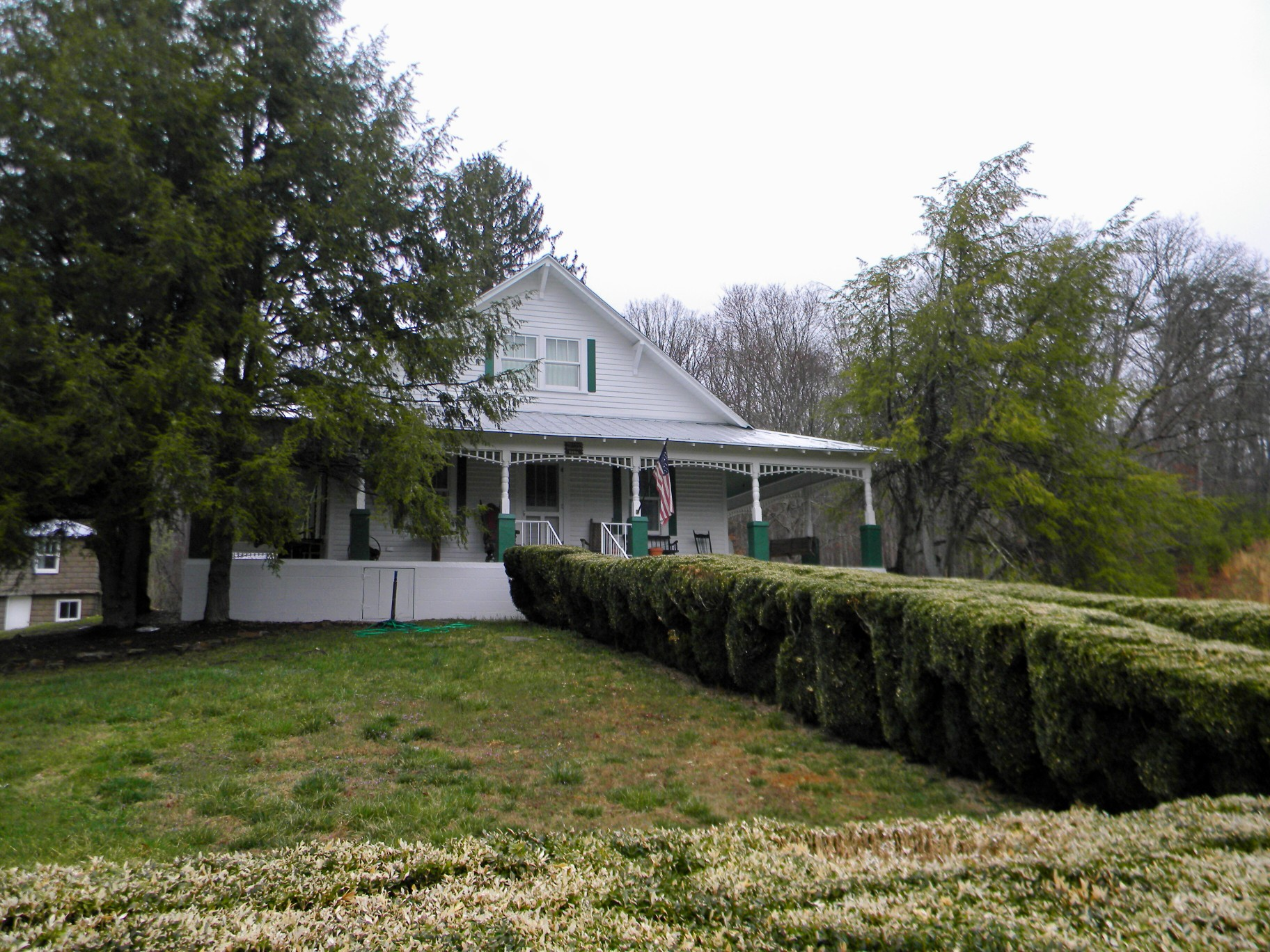
- Maybelle and Ezra Carter House in 2014

- Location within Virginia Location within the United States
- Location: Rt. 614, Maces Spring, Virginia
- Coordinates: 36°40′26″N 82°24′10″W
- Area: 2 acres (0.81 ha)
- Built: 1936
- Architectural style: Scott's County Vernacular
- MPS: Carter Family TR
- NRHP reference No.: 85001412
- VLR No.: 084-0015

Significant dates
- Added to NRHP: June 12, 1985
- Designated VLR: April 16, 1985

Maybelle and Ezra Carter House is a historic home located at Maces Spring, Scott County, Virginia. The original one-story, frame dwelling was enlarged by an additional 1/2-story for more bedroom space in the 1920s-1930s. The 1936 remodeling resulted in a vernacular interpretation of the popular Bungalow style. The house is most notable for its association with the Carter Family, a traditional American folk music group that recorded between 1927 and 1956. It was the home of Maybelle Addington Carter (1909–1978), who was married to Alvin Pleasant "A.P." Delaney Carter's (1891–1960) brother Ezra Carter (Eck).

It was listed on the National Register of Historic Places in 1985.
