= A. P. Carter Store =

Historic commercial building in Virginia, United States

- U.S. National Register of Historic Places
- Virginia Landmarks Register
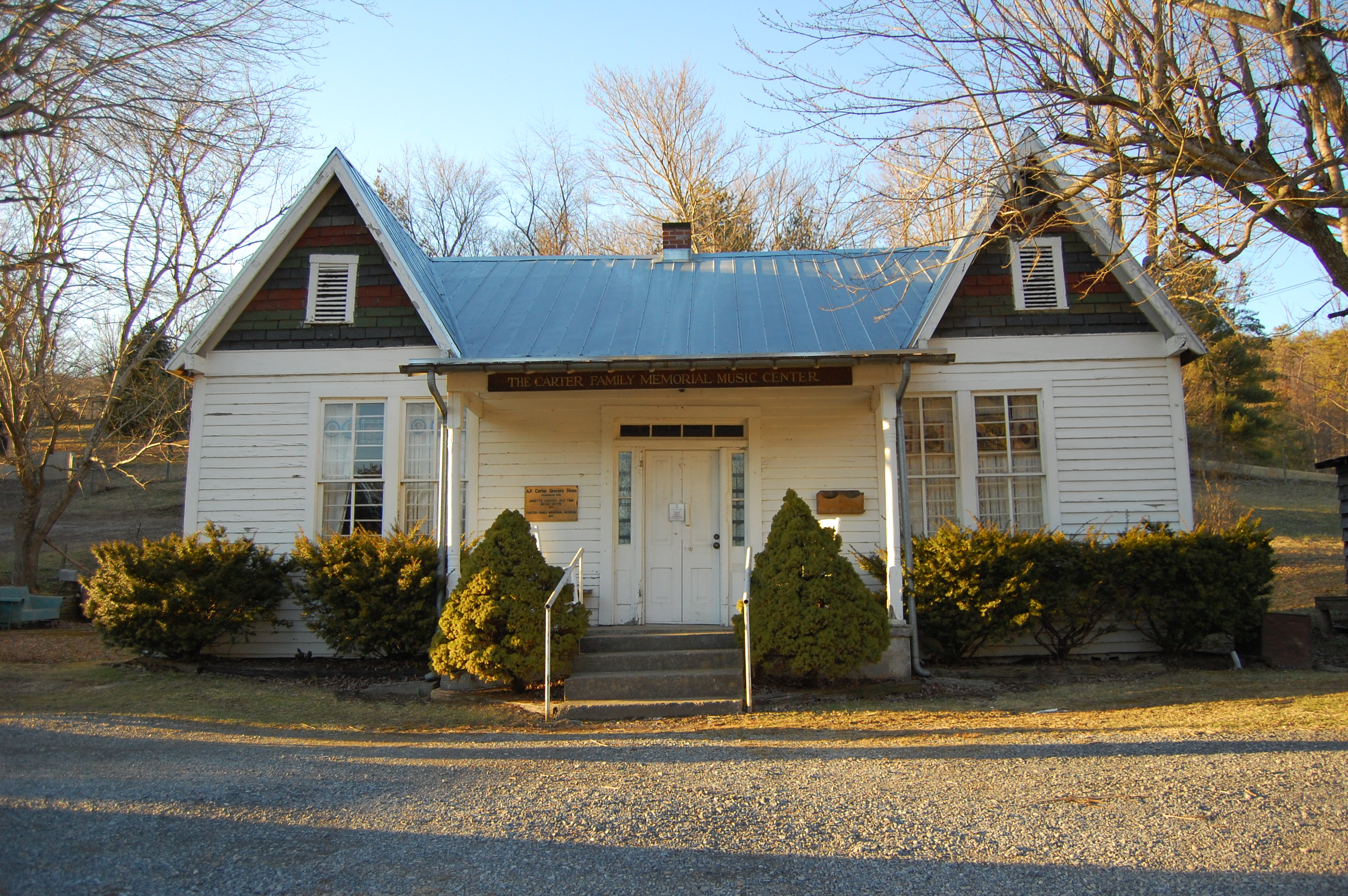
- View of the store in 2009

- Location within Virginia Location within the United States
- Location: Rt. 614, Maces Spring, Virginia
- Coordinates: 36°40′5″N 82°24′47″W
- Area: 1 acre (0.40 ha)
- Built: 1945
- Architect: Multiple
- Architectural style: Vernacular Commercial
- MPS: Carter Family TR
- NRHP reference No.: 85001411
- VLR No.: 084-0006

Significant dates
- Added to NRHP: June 14, 1985
- Designated VLR: April 16, 1985

A. P. Carter Store is a historic general store museum located at Maces Spring, Scott County, Virginia. It was built in 1945, and is a one-story frame building with a cross-gable roof. The store is most notable for its association with the Carter Family, a traditional American folk music group that recorded between 1927 and 1956. It was the residence and small store operated by former country artist A.P. Carter (1891–1960) after he left the music business.

It was listed on the National Register of Historic Places in 1985. It is now open weekly before concerts as a museum operated by the Carter Family Fold.
