= A. P. Carter =

American singer-songwriter (1891–1960)

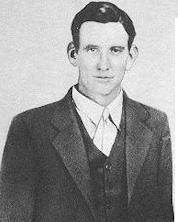
- Alvin Pleasant Carter

Background information
- Born: Alvin Pleasant Delaney Carter; December 15, 1891; Maces Spring, Virginia, U.S.
- Died: November 7, 1960 (aged 68) Kingsport, Tennessee, U.S.
- Genres: Country, folk, gospel
- Occupations: Singer-songwriter, musician
- Instruments: Vocals, guitar
- Years active: 1926–1943; 1952–1956
- Labels: Victor, ARC, Decca
- Formerly of: Carter Family

Alvin Pleasant Delaney Carter (December 15, 1891 – November 7, 1960) was an American musician and a founding member of the Carter Family, one of the most popular acts in the history of country music.

A.P. suffered from a tremor in his right hand, which his mother ascribed to a lightning strike when she was pregnant. Despite this, he successfully learned to play the fiddle and guitar during his childhood.

A.P., Sara Dougherty, and Maybelle Carter started the Carter Family with Maybelle's husband and A.P.'s brother, Ezra, as manager in 1927. They played up until Sara and A.P.'s divorce in 1936, but reunited in 1956.

== Biography ==
A.P. Carter was born to Robert C. Carter and Mollie Arvelle Bays in Maces Spring, Virginia, an area that became Hiltons, Virginia, located in Poor Valley. A.P. was sometimes called "Doc."

On June 18, 1915, he married Sara Dougherty; they had three children: Gladys (Millard), Janette (Jett), and Joe. In 1927, he formed the Carter Family band together with his wife. They were joined by Sara's cousin, Maybelle, who was married to A.P.'s brother, Ezra Carter (father of June Carter Cash). Since A.P. worked as a traveling salesman, Carter was known for traveling extensively throughout Central Appalachia. His home in Poor Valley, in deep southwestern Virginia, is centrally located among eastern Tennessee, western North Carolina, eastern Kentucky, and southeastern West Virginia. (The distance from Maces Spring to the state lines of each of those four other states is less than 25 miles). Carter was often accompanied by his friend Lesley Riddle, collecting and blending songs, particularly from Appalachian musicians, and from attending church services in many isolated localities, the source of the Carter Family's many religious songs. Some of the songs became so closely identified with A.P. Carter that he has been popularly, but mistakenly, credited with writing them. For example, "Keep on the Sunny Side of Life" was published in 1901 with the words being credited to Ada Blenkhorn and the music credited to Howard Entwisle, and "The Meeting in the Air" has been published with credit given for music and words to I.G. Martin.

In a case of perfect timing, Victor Records was very interested in 1927 in widening the scope of its recordings and records so as to sell more of their record players, called "Victrolas". Victor Records sent a "mobile" recording team around the country, seeking popular music. One of their stops was in Bristol, Tennessee, just a few miles from Maces Spring, and the Carter Family went there to record some songs, which soon became popular country-wide.

A.P. and Sara separated in 1932, in part as a result of Sara's having an affair with A.P.'s cousin—A.P. was away from home for long periods in his job as a traveling salesman—and his search for new musical ideas. They divorced in 1939. The band remained together for several years afterwards, but broke up in 1943. While Maybelle and her daughters continued to tour as the Carter Family, A.P. left the music business to run a general store in Hiltons, Virginia.

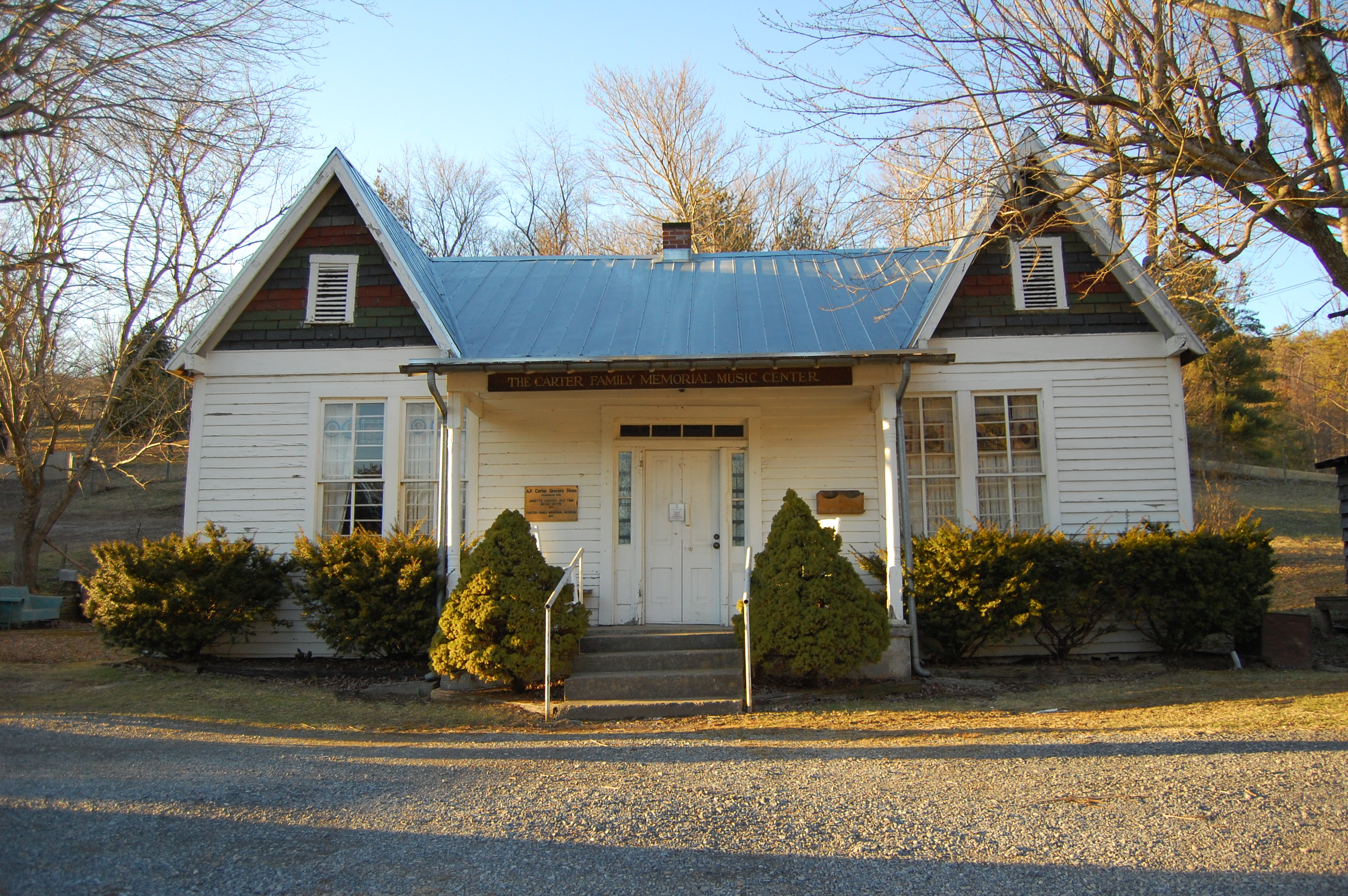
A. P. Carter Store, which A.P. ran after retiring from the music business

Beginning in 1952, A.P. reunited with Sara, along with their children Janette and Joe, to record for the Kentucky based Acme Records. The majority of these recordings were made in the same building in Bristol where the original family first recorded in 1927. The new Carter Family was featured on stations such as WCKY, WWVA, KXEL, and many more. The family also appeared on a national CBS program. These records would prove to be A.P. Carter's final recordings, with records in the new lineup being made well into 1956.

A.P. Carter died of Arteriosclerotic Heart Disease, in Kingsport, Tennessee, on November 7, 1960, at the age of 68. He was buried in the Mt. Vernon United Methodist Church cemetery in the Maces Springs area of Hiltons, Virginia.

== Legacy ==
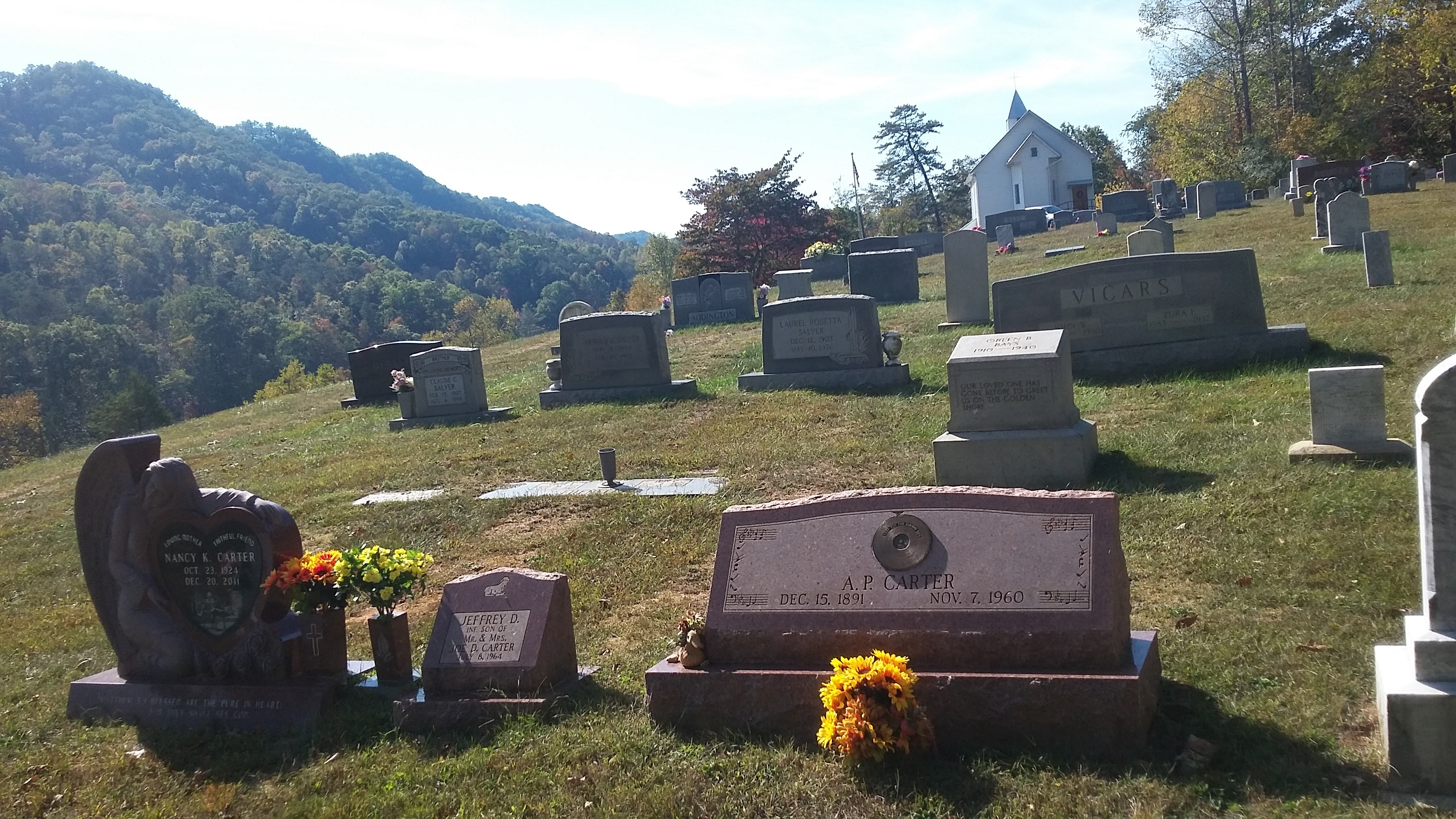
Grave of A.P. Carter at Mount Vernon United Methodist Church at Maces Springs (Hiltons), Virginia

Despite dying in relative obscurity, A. P. Carter was inducted into the Nashville Songwriters Hall of Fame in 1970. Carter was inducted as part of the Carter Family in the Country Music Hall of Fame in 1970. In 1993, his image appeared on a U.S. postage stamp honoring the Carter Family. In 2001 he was inducted posthumously into the International Bluegrass Music Hall of Honor.

The song "A.P. Carter" by the Phipps Family is dedicated to A.P. and was released in 1962.

PBS aired a one-hour show on A.P. Carter and the Carter Family in 2005 on American Experience titled "Will The Circle Be Unbroken".

In recent years, Barter Theatre in Abingdon, Virginia, has performed a play by Douglas Pote based on A.P.'s life, called Keep on the Sunny Side .

On her 2008 album All I Intended to Be, Emmylou Harris includes the song "How She Could Sing the Wildwood Flower", co-written with Kate and Anna McGarrigle, about the relationship between A.P. and Sara, inspired by a documentary that the three of them saw on television.

The song "When I'm Gone", written by A.P. Carter and performed by the Carter Family in 1931, was revived in 2009 when Lulu and the Lampshades created a reworked version, using the cup game as percussion, titled "Cups (When I'm Gone)," which in turn was famously covered by Anna Kendrick for her 2012 film "Pitch Perfect".

The A. P. and Sara Carter House, A. P. Carter Homeplace, A. P. Carter Store, Maybelle and Ezra Carter House, and Mt. Vernon Methodist Church are listed on the National Register of Historic Places as components of the Carter Family Thematic Resource.

In keeping with A. P.'s dying wishes, his daughter Janette Carter restarted regular performances at A. P. Carter's general store venue, and the organization became known as the Carter Family Fold, which continues to offer regular Appalachian music performances.

== Family tree ==
Robert C. Carter	Mollie Arvelle Bays
Maybelle Carter	Ezra Carter	A.P. Carter	Sara Carter
Helen Carter	Anita Carter	June Carter Cash	Johnny Cash	Gladys Carter	Janette Carter	Joe Carter
John Carter Cash

== See also ==
- Songs written by A. P. Carter
