= A. P. Carter Homeplace =

Historic house in Virginia, United States

- U.S. National Register of Historic Places
- Virginia Landmarks Register
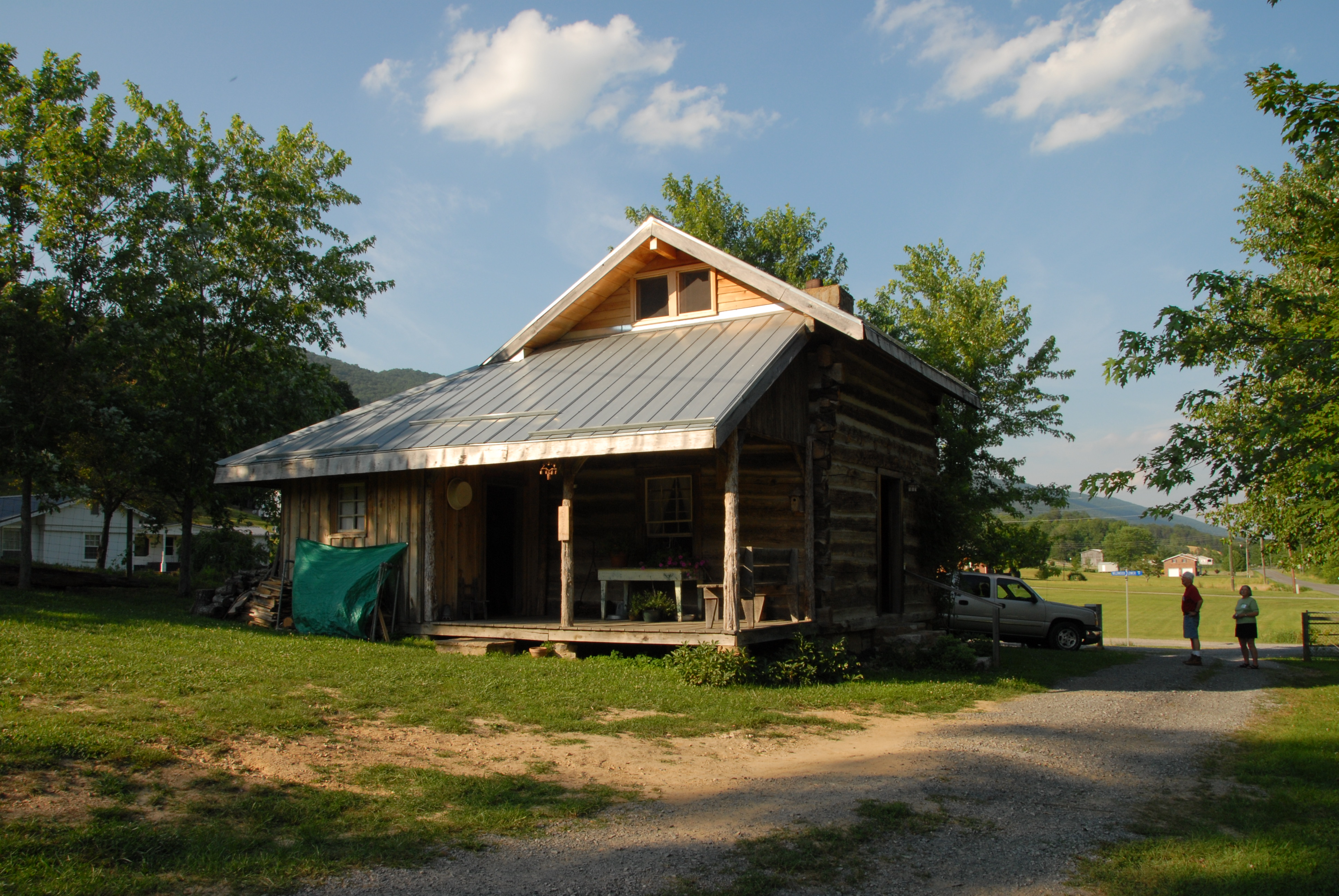
- View of the cabin in 2009

- Location within Virginia Location within the United States
- Location: SE of Maces Spring near jct. of VA 614 and VA 691, Maces Spring, Virginia
- Coordinates: 36°40′1″N 82°23′39″W
- Area: 33 acres (13 ha)
- Built: 1891
- Architectural style: Log House
- MPS: Carter Family TR
- NRHP reference No.: 76002118
- VLR No.: 084-0020

Significant dates
- Added to NRHP: July 30, 1976
- Designated VLR: April 16, 1985

A. P. Carter Homeplace is a historic home located at Maces Spring, Scott County, Virginia. It is a small, one-story, half-dovetailed log cabin, with a single room on the first floor and loft above. The house is most notable for its association with a traditional American folk music group that recorded between 1927 and 1956. It is the birthplace of Alvin Pleasant "A.P." Delaney Carter (1891–1960) of the Carter Family.

It was listed on the National Register of Historic Places in 1976.
