= Mt. Vernon Methodist Church =

Historic church in Virginia, United States

- U.S. National Register of Historic Places
- Virginia Landmarks Register
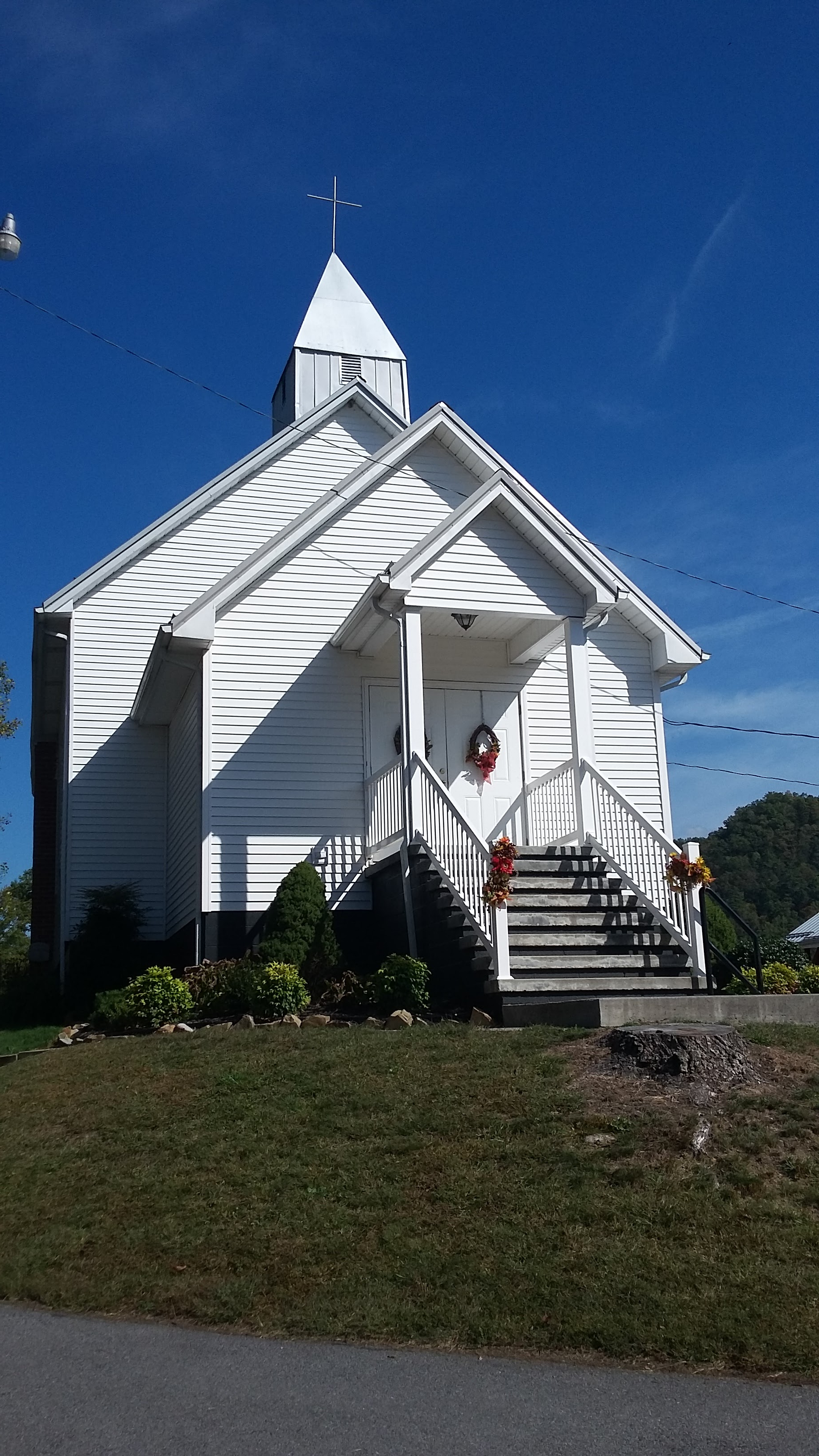
- Mt. Vernon Methodist Church in 2016

- Location within Virginia Location within the United States
- Location: Rt. 614, Maces Spring, Virginia
- Coordinates: 36°40′35″N 82°23′15″W
- Area: 1.5 acres (0.61 ha)
- Built: 1895
- Architectural style: Scott's County Vernacular
- MPS: Carter Family TR
- NRHP reference No.: 85001413
- VLR No.: 084-0013

Significant dates
- Added to NRHP: June 12, 1985
- Designated VLR: April 16, 1985

Mt. Vernon Methodist Church is a historic Methodist church in Maces Spring, Virginia, United States. It was built about 1895 and is a one-story, rectangular frame structure with gable roof and simple wooden steeple. The church is most notable for its association with the Carter Family, a traditional American Country music group that recorded between 1927 and 1956. Behind the church is the cemetery containing the graves of Alvin Pleasant "A.P." Delaney Carter (1891–1960) and his wife Sara Dougherty Carter (1898–1979).

It was listed on the National Register of Historic Places in 1985.
