= Maces Spring, Virginia =

Unincorporated community in Virginia, US

Coordinates: 36°40′20″N 82°24′10″W

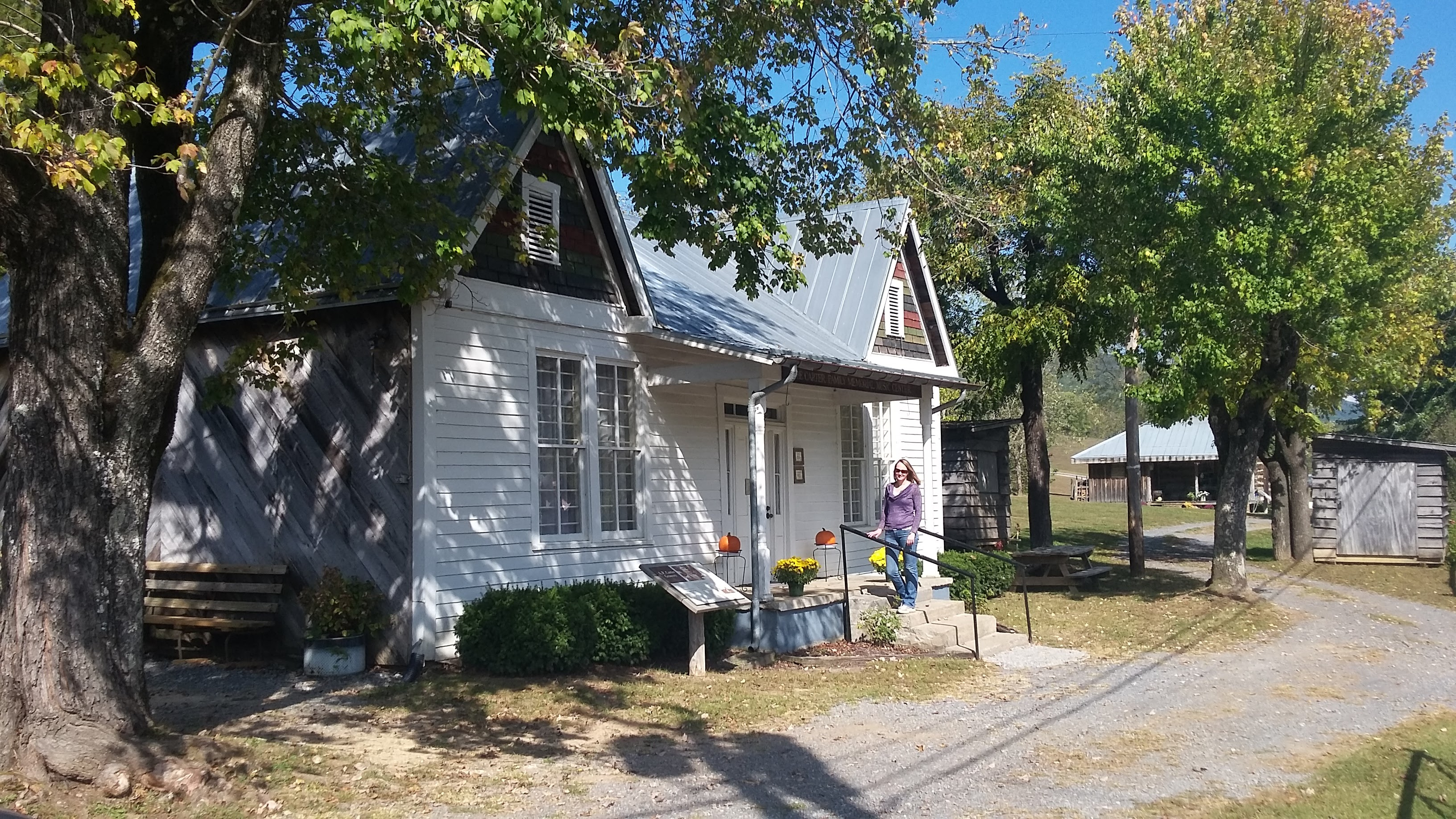
- Interactive map of Maces Spring, Virginia
- Country: United States
- State: Virginia
- County: Scott County

Maces Spring is a small unincorporated community in Scott County, Virginia, United States, along State Route 614, in an area known as Poor Valley. The settlement consists of a small number of houses. There are no longer any stores in Maces Spring; its main claim to fame is its association with the country music group the Carter Family.

Alvin Pleasant Delaney Carter, also known as Doc or A.P., was born in Maces Spring and in 1914 he brought his 16-year-old bride, Sara Dougherty, to live there. They are both buried in the graveyard behind Mount Vernon Methodist Church. A.P., Sara and A.P.'s sister-in-law, Maybelle Carter formed the Carter Family in 1927. Route 614 is now called the A.P. Carter Highway and two of A.P. and Sara's children, Joe (died 2005) and Jeanette (died 2006), opened a music hall called The Carter Fold on the Clinch Mountain side of the road.

The community is part of the Kingsport-Bristol-Bristol, TN-VA Metropolitan Statistical Area, which is a component of the Johnson City-Kingsport-Bristol, TN-VA Combined Statistical Area – commonly known as the Tri-Cities region.

The A. P. and Sara Carter House, A. P. Carter Homeplace, A. P. Carter Store, Maybelle and Ezra Carter House, and Mt. Vernon Methodist Church are listed on the National Register of Historic Places as components of the Carter Family Thematic Resource.
