= Newport Folk Festival lineups by year =

List of Newport Folk Festival lineups

This is a list of Newport Folk Festival lineups by year.

The Newport Folk Festival was founded in 1959 is held annually in Newport, Rhode Island. The festival was first held at Freebody Park in downtown Newport, and moved to the Festival Field site in 1965. The festival was held at the field until 1969, and no festival was held in 1970. The festival returned to Newport at the Fort Adams State Park in 1985, and it has been held at the park annually since then.

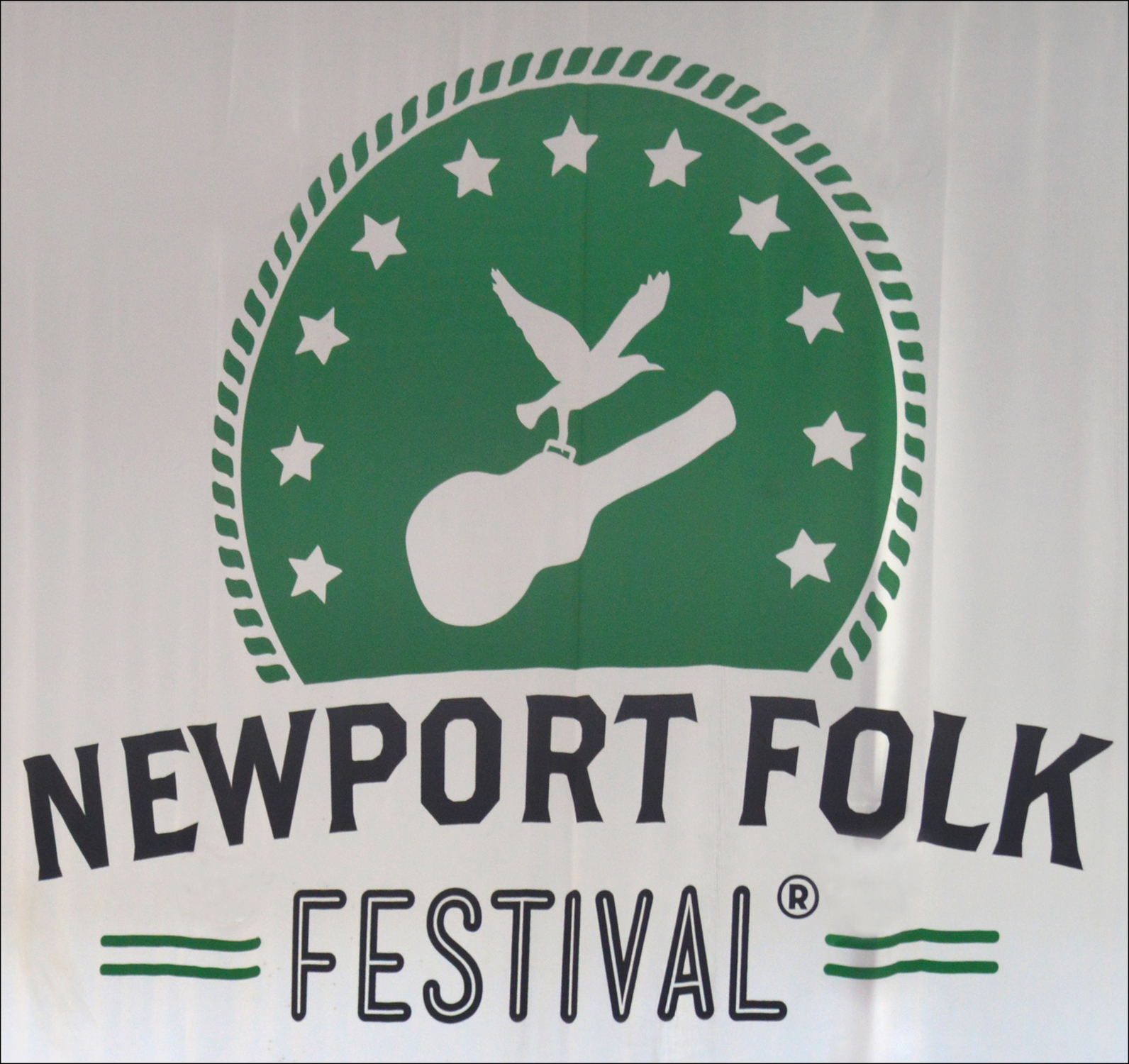
Newport Folk Festival logo at the 2014 festival.

== Lineups ==
Artists are listed in alphabetical order, with solo artists listed by last name.

=== 1950s and 1960s ===
Year	Lineup	Ref.
1959	Leon Bibb, Oscar Brand, Hylo Brown and the Timberliners with Earl Scruggs, The Clancy Brothers, Barbara Dane, Reverend Gary Davis, Bo Diddley, Jimmy Driftwood, Billy Faier, Bob Gibson with Joan Baez, Cynthia Gooding, Frank Hamilton, The Kingston Trio, Kossoy Sisters, Tommy Makem, Ed McCurdy, Brownie McGhee and Sonny Terry, Memphis Slim, The New Lost City Ramblers, John Jacob Niles, Odetta, Martha Schlamme, Jean Ritchie, The Stanley Brothers with the Clinch Mountain Boys, Pete Seeger, Frank Warner.	
1960	Abyssinian Baptist Gospel Choir, Joan Baez, Theodore Bikel, Oscar Brand, The Brothers Four, Fleming Brown, Bud & Travis, Jean Carignan, The Clancy Brothers with Tommy Makem, The Robert De Cormier Chorale, Jimmy Driftwood, Lester Flatt and Earl Scruggs with the Foggy Mountain Boys, Jesse Fuller, Gateway Singers, Bob Gibson, Will Holt, John Lee Hooker, Cisco Houston, Mahalia Jackson, Bill Lee, The Limeliters, Ewan MacColl, Ed McCurdy, Alan Mills, The New Lost City Ramblers, John Jacob Niles, Odetta, Sabicas, Peggy Seeger, Pete Seeger, The Tarriers, Studs Terkel, Frank Warner, The Weavers, Robert Pete Williams.	
1961	No festival.	
1962	No festival.	
1963	Clarence Ashley, Joan Baez, Hélène Baillargeon, Theodore Bikel, Jean Carignan, Maybelle Carter, Paul Clayton, Judy Collins, Reverend Gary Davis, The Dillards, Bob Dylan, Ramblin' Jack Elliott, Freedom Singers, John Hammond, Sam Hinton, John Lee Hooker, Mississippi John Hurt, Ian & Sylvia, Jim & Jesse and the Virginia Boys, Bernice Johnson, Bessie Jones and the Sea Island Singers, Tex Logan, Kiva American Indian Group, Ed McCurdy, Raun MacKinnon, Brownie McGhee and Sonny Terry, Bill Monroe and the Blue Grass Boys, The Morris Brothers, The New Lost City Ramblers, Peter, Paul & Mary, Frank Proffitt, Jean Redpath, Jean Ritchie, The Rooftop Singers, Pete Seeger, Mike Settle, The Tarriers, Dave Van Ronk, Jackie Washington, Doc Watson, Mac Wiseman.	
1964	Joan Baez, Ken and Neriah Benfield, Theodore Bikel, Blue Ridge Mountain Dancers, Cajun band (performers not specified), Guy Carawan and the Freedom Group, Gaither Carlton, Johnny Cash, Len Chandler, Sam Charters, The Clancy Brothers with Tommy Makem, Tristram P. Coffin, Elizabeth Cotten, John Davis, Willie Doss, Jimmy Driftwood, Bob Dylan, Hamza El Din, Ran Eliran, Séamus Ennis, Sleepy John Estes, José Feliciano, Jesse Fuller, Ollie Gilbert, Ronnie Gilbert and Ralph Rinzler, The Greenbriar Boys, Sarah Gunning, Herbert Halpert, Elgia Hickok, Hindman Settlement School Dancers, Son House, Mississippi John Hurt, Willis James, Bessie Jones and the Georgia Sea Island Singers, Bill Keith, The Kentucky Colonels, Koerner, Ray & Glover, Jim Kweskin Jug Band, Billy Ray Latham, Alan Lomax, Noelani Mahoe, Fred and Annie Mae McDowell, Clayton McMichen, The Chad Mitchell Trio, Moving Star Hall Singers, Hammie Nixon and Yank Rachell, Phil Ochs, Odetta, Glenn Ohrlin, Osborne Brothers, Tom Paxton, Chet Parker, Joe Patterson, Peter, Paul & Mary, Phipps Family, Frank Proffitt, Doc Reese, Dock Reese, Malvina Reynolds, Almeda Riddle, Judy Roderick, The Rodriguez Brothers, Sacred Harp Singers, Buffy Sainte-Marie, Mike Seeger and Jean Ritchie, Pete Seeger, Dewey Shepherd, Hobart Smith, The Stanley Brothers, Carter Stanley, Ralph Stanley, The Staple Singers, Don Stover, The Swan Silvertones, Bill Thatcher, Mary Travers, Louis Vinis LeJeune, Muddy Waters, Arnold Watson, Doc Watson, The Watson Family with Doc Watson, Hedy West, Clarence White, D. K. Wilgus, Robert Wilkins, Robert Pete Williams, Kaupena Wong, Peter Yarrow.	
1965	Joan Baez with Donovan, Horton Barker, Margaret Barry and Michael Gorman, Samuel Bayard, Katie Bell Nubin, Fiddler Beers Family, Byron and Lue Berline, Theodore Bikel, Blue Ridge Mountain Dancers, Oscar Brand, The Paul Butterfield Blues Band, Cajun Band (performers not specified), Hamilton Camp, Cape Breton Singers, Maybelle Carter, The Chambers Brothers, Len Chandler, Charles River Valley Boys, Cousin Emmy, Reverend Gary Davis, Bob Dylan (electric performance), Richard and Mimi Fariña, Ronnie Gilbert, Fannie Lou Hamer, Roscoe Holcomb, Kathy and Carol, Lightnin' Hopkins, Son House, Rev. Francis Hubbard, Mississippi John Hurt, Ian & Sylvia, Ishangi Dance Troupe, Willis James, Norman Kennedy, Jim Kweskin Jug Band, Gordon Lightfoot, Mance Lipscomb, The Lilly Brothers and Tex Logan, A. L. Lloyd, Alan Lomax, Sam and Kirk McGee with Memphis Slim and Willie Dixon, Bill Monroe and the Blue Grass Boys, Moving Star Hall Singers, New England Contra Dancers, The New Lost City Ramblers, New York Street Games, Odetta, Joe Patterson, Peter, Paul & Mary, Dock Reese and the Texas Work Song Group, Jean Ritchie, Eck Robertson, Charles Seeger, Pete Seeger, Beth Van Over, Eric Von Schmidt, Annie Walters, Josh White, Ed Young and the Southern Drum and Fife Corps.	
1966	Dorothy Love Coates & The Original Gospel Harmonettes, Judy Collins, Hazel Dickens and Alice Gerrard, Tim Hardin, Dixie Hummingbirds, Ramblin' Jack Elliott, Skip James, Jim & Jessie and the Virginia Boys, Lester Flatt and Earl Scruggs and the Foggy Mountain Boys, Mitch Greenhill and Jeff Gutcheon, Jim Kweskin Jug Band with Geoff Muldaur, Long Gone Niles, Richie Havens, Son House, Howlin' Wolf, Ali Akbar Khan, The Lovin' Spoonful, Phil Ochs, Tom Paxton, Preservation Hall Jazz Band with Billie and De De Pierce, Buffy Sainte-Marie, Pete Seeger, Joseph Spence, The Swan Silvertones with Claude Jeter, Yomo Toro, Bukka White, Ed Young and the Southern Fife and Drum Corps.	
1967	Jack Andrews, Joan Baez, Theodore Bikel, Oscar Brand, Maybelle and Sara Carter, The Chambers Brothers, Leonard Cohen, Judy Collins, Dave Dudley, Mimi Fariña, Russell Fluharty, Arlo Guthrie, Janis Ian, The Incredible String Band, Galaz String Band, Grandpa Jones, Gordon Lightfoot, Jim Kweskin Jug Band, Raymond Melton, Joni Mitchell, Bill Monroe, Jean Ritchie, Buffy Sainte-Marie, Pete Seeger, Siegel–Schwall Band, J.B. Smith, The Staple Singers, Sister Rosetta Tharpe, Merle Travis, Peter Walker, Sippie Wallace, Muddy Waters, Robert Pete Williams.	
1968	Roy Acuff, Joan Baez, Big Brother and the Holding Company, Theodore Bikel, Bread and Puppet Theater, Tim Buckley, Elizabeth Cotten, Ramblin' Jack Elliott, Mimi Fariña, Arlo Guthrie, Buddy Guy and Junior Wells, George Hamilton IV, John Hartford, Richie Havens, Joe Heaney, Janis Ian, Buell Kazee, B.B. King, Frederick Douglass Kirkpatrick, Jim Kweskin, Taj Mahal, Fred McDowell, Jerry Merrick, Joni Mitchell, Katy Bell Nubin, Pete Seeger, Eric Von Schmidt, Doc Watson, The Young Tradition.	
1969	The B.C. Harmonizers, Bozinos Belios, Theodore Bikel, Oscar Brand, Jaime Brockett, John Allan Cameron, Johnny Cash (with June Carter, Doug Kershaw, and Kris Kristofferson), Len Chandler, Chris & Barbara, The Cook Country Singing Convention, Ramblin' Jack Elliott, Sleepy John Estes and Yank Rachell, The Everly Brothers, Fiddler's Club of Rhode Island, Jesse Fuller, Tret Fure, Fred Gerlach, Arlo Guthrie, The Ham Fat Spasm Band, Carlton Haney, John Hartford, Bernice Johnson Reagon, Bill Keith, Frederick Douglass Kirkpatrick and R.L. Kirkpatrick, The Key West Junkanoo Band, John Koerner and Willie Murphy, Son House, Lera and the Macedonian Ensemble, Tex Logan and Don Stover, Taj Mahal, Brownie McGhee and Sonny Terry, Joni Mitchell, Bill Monroe and the Blue Grass Boys, Van Morrison, Buddy Moss and Brownie McGhee, Jean Bosco Mwenda, The New Lost City Ramblers, The Newport Bridge & American Devil Association, Oldtimer's String Band with Fred Cockerham, Panacea Jug Band, Pentangle, The Pennsylvania Tambouritza Orchestra, Carl Perkins and The Tennessee Three, Frank Proffitt Jr., the Reindeau Family, Don Reno and Bill Harrell and the Bluegrass Cutups, Jean Ritchie, Jim Rooney, Buffy Sainte-Marie, Mike Seeger, Pete Seeger, Jay Silver, Björn Ståbi and Ole Hjorth, James Taylor, Big Mama Thornton, Artie and Happy Traum, Jerry Jeff Walker with David Bromberg, Muddy Waters, Billy Edd Wheeler, Mac Wiseman, Steve Young.	

=== 1980s ===
Year	Lineup	Ref.
1985	Joan Baez, Greg Brown, David Buskin and Robin Batteau, Judy Collins, Ramblin' Jack Elliott, Mimi Fariña, Arlo Guthrie, Bill Keith and Jim Rooney, Taj Mahal, David Massengill, David Mallett, Bill Morrissey, New Grass Revival, Mark O'Connor, Tom Paxton, Bonnie Raitt, Peter Rowan, Sweet Honey in the Rock, Dave Van Ronk, Doc and Merle Watson.	
1986	David Bromberg, The Chicken Chokers, Nanci Griffith, Richie Havens, Hot Rize, Si Kahn, Alison Krauss, Patty Larkin, Christine Lavin, Kate & Anna McGarrigle, Odetta, Tom Rush, Claudia Schmidt, Savoy-Doucet Band, John Sebastian, Corky Siegel, Bill Staines, Sweet Honey in the Rock.	
1987	Joan Baez, The Bobs, Billy Bragg, Johnny Copeland, Judy Collins, Folk Kaleidoscope (with George Gritzbach, Cormac McCarthy, Bill Morrissey, Northern Lights, and Moses Rascoe), Arlo Guthrie, John Hammond, Patty Larkin, Alison Krauss, Jim Kweskin Jug Band (with Richard Greene, Bill Keith, Geoff Muldaur, Maria Muldaur, Fritz Richmond, and John Sebastian), New Grass Revival, Tom Paxton, Bonnie Raitt, Schooner Fare, Eric and Caitlin Von Schmidt, Katie Webster.	
1988	Shawn Colvin, Robert Cray, Dr. John, Patty Larkin, Los Lobos, Odadda!, Taj Mahal, Nashville Bluegrass Band, Holly Near, Tom Paxton, Queen Ida and the Bon Temps Zydeco Band, Buffy Sainte-Marie, Richard Thompson, Artie and Happy Traum, Doc Watson, Cheryl Wheeler.	
1989	Theodore Bikel, Buckwheat Zydeco, The Clancy Brothers with Robbie O'Connell, Shawn Colvin, Ry Cooder, Emmylou Harris, John Hiatt, John Lee Hooker, B.B. King, Laura Nyro, Odetta, John Prine, Leon Redbone, Pete Seeger, Cheryl Wheeler, Songwriting workshop (with Ashley Cleveland, Jack Hardy, David Massengil, Rod MacDonald, Bill Morrisey, Northern Lights, Chris Smither, and Frank Tedesso).	

=== 1990s ===
Year	Lineup	Ref.
1990	Joan Baez, Luka Bloom, Greg Brown, Ashley Cleveland, Ry Cooder and David Lindley, Indigo Girls, Flaco Jiménez, Ladysmith Black Mambazo, Christine Lavin, Robert Earl Keen, David Olney, The Roches, Michelle Shocked with Tower of Power, Chris Smither, Sweet Honey in the Rock, The Subdudes, Richard Thompson, The Wild Magnolias with Rebirth Brass Band.	
1991	Luka Bloom, Mary Chapin Carpenter, Boozoo Chavis, Judy Collins, Shawn Colvin, Cliff Eberhardt, Paul Geremia, Indigo Girls, Nanci Griffith, John Hiatt, Kate & Anna McGarrigle, Bill Morrissey, Randy Newman, John Prine, The Staple Singers, Richard Thompson, Suzanne Vega.	
1992	The Band, BeauSoleil, Mary Chapin Carpenter, Shawn Colvin, Bruce Cockburn, Iris DeMent, Pat Donohue, The Fairfield Four, Four Voices in Harmony (Joan Baez, Mary Chapin Carpenter and Indigo Girls), Patty Larkin, Nashville Bluegrass Band, Rachel Polisher, Yomo Toro, Suzanne Vega, Loudon Wainwright III, David Wilcox, Cris Williamson.	
1993	The Band, Boukman Eksperyans, Four Voices in Harmony (Joan Baez, Mary Chapin Carpenter and Indigo Girls), Mary Chapin Carpenter, John Gorka, Nanci Griffith, Tish Hinojosa, Peter Keane, Alison Krauss & Union Station, Sonny Landreth, Daniel Lanois, Sarah McLachlan, James McMurtry, Peter, Paul & Mary, John Prine, Sweet Honey in the Rock.	
1994	Iris Dement, Cliff Eberhardt, Fairport Convention, Ruth Gerson, Indigo Girls, Arlo Guthrie, Sarah McLachlan, Mighty Clouds of Joy, The Nields, Randy Newman, Ellis Paul, Michelle Shocked, Richard Shindell, The Story, Richard Thompson, The Williams Brothers, Dar Williams.	
1995	Joan Baez, Mary Black, Luka Bloom, Mary Chapin Carpenter, Ani DiFranco, Ferron, John Hiatt, Indigo Girls, Keb' Mo', The Jayhawks, Patty Larkin, Laura Love, Bill Morrissey, Carol Noonan, Terrance Simien, Bob Weir and Rob Wasserman, Cheryl Wheeler, Victoria Williams.	
1996	Joan Armatrading, Clarence "Gatemouth" Brown, Bruce Cockburn, Cordelia's Dad, Ani DiFranco, Jerry Douglas, John Gorka, John Hiatt, Indigo Girls, Patty Larkin, Lisa Loeb, Maura O'Connell, Peter Rowan, Michelle Shocked, Cheryl Wheeler, Suzanne Vega, David Wilcox.	
1997	Joan Baez, Mary Black, The Borrowers, Jonatha Brooke, Rosanne Cash, Guy Davis, Betty Elders, Ramblin' Jack Elliott, John Gorka, Hart-Rouge, John Hiatt, Janis Ian, Lucy Kaplansky, Little Feat, Sinéad Lohan, Moxy Früvous, Peter Mulvey, The Nields, U. Utah Phillips, Suzzy Roche, Martin Sexton, Richard Shindell, Eric Taylor, James Taylor, Violent Femmes, Gillian Welch and David Rawlings, Dar Williams.	
1998	David Bromberg, Dee Carstensen, Marc Cohn, Rodney Crowell, Ani DiFranco, Donna the Buffalo, Béla Fleck, Vance Gilbert, Nanci Griffith, Trina Hamlin, Janis Ian, Indigo Girls, Alison Krauss, Lyle Lovett, Raymond Myles and the Rams, Tom Rush, Eric Taylor, Violent Femmes, Loudon Wainwright III, Susan Werner, Cheryl Wheeler, Brooks Williams, Dar Williams. The Newport Folk Festival on Tour: National touring festival featuring some of the above acts, plus Joan Baez, Mark Eitzel, Jimmie Dale Gilmore, Leo Kottke, Rickie Lee Jones, John Hiatt, The Staple Singers, Wilco, Lucinda Williams.	
1999	Joan Armatrading, Mary Black, Catie Curtis, Cry Cry Cry, Tico Da Costa, Stacey Earle, Steve Earle and the Dukes with Tim O'Brien, Seth Farber, Melissa Ferrick, Paul Geremia, Indigo Girls, Patty Griffin, Alvin Youngblood Hart, Ray Wylie Hubbard, Robert Earl Keen, Jennifer Kimball, Dana and Karen Kletter with Merrie Amsterburg, Ladysmith Black Mambazo, Pamela Means, Lori McKenna, Bill Morrissey, Katryna and Nerissa Nields, Northern Lights, David Olney, Beth Orton, Ellis Paul, Liz Queler, Martin Sexton, Susan Tedeschi, Suzanne Vega, Whirligig, Wilco.	

=== 2000s ===
Year	Lineup	Ref.
2000	Mary Chapin Carpenter, Guy Clark, Slaid Cleaves, Shawn Colvin, Stacey Earle, Cliff Eberhardt, Equation, Melissa Ferrick, Béla Fleck and the Flecktones, Mary Gauthier, John Gorka, Kerry Grombacher, Terri Hendrix and Lloyd Maines, Ray Wylie Hubbard, Lucy Kaplansky, Peter Keane, Jess Klein, Natalie MacMaster, Natalie Merchant, Willie Nelson, Bob Neuwirth, Carrie Newcomer, Peter Rowan's Texas Trio with Tony Rice, Toshi Reagon and Big Lovely, Richard Shindell, The String Cheese Incident, Cheryl Wheeler, Dar Williams.	
2001	Rory Block and Kate McDonnell, Paul Brady, Jonatha Brooke, Sam Bush, The Campbell Brothers, Catie Curtis, Julian Dawson, Mike Doughty, Mark Erelli, The Flatlanders, Vance Gilbert, Nanci Griffith, The Hackberry Ramblers, Emmylou Harris, Sara Hickman, Indigo Girls, David Johansen and the Harry Smiths, Patty Larkin, Mary Lou Lord, Baaba Maal, Susan McKeown and the Chanting House, John Mooney, North Mississippi Allstars with Robert Randolph and John Medeski, Joan Osborne, Ellis Paul, Toshi Reagon and Big Lovely, RIG (Sarah Lee Guthrie, Johnny Irion, and Tao Rodríguez-Seeger), Michelle Shocked, Victoria Williams and Mark Olson, Michael Veitch, The Waifs, Gillian Welch and David Rawlings, Kelly Willis.	
2002	Rani Arbo and Daisy Mayhem, The Blind Boys of Alabama, Jonatha Brooke, Slaid Cleaves, Bruce Cockburn, Shawn Colvin, Kris Delmhorst, Bob Dylan, Melissa Ferrick, Gigi, John Gorka, Vance Gilbert, Arlo Guthrie, Caroline Herring, Bob Hillman, Rosie Ledet, Laurie Lewis, Dave Massengill, Kate & Anna McGarrigle, Lynn Miles, Geoff Muldaur, Maura O'Connell, Richard Shindell, Louise Taylor, The Waifs, Dar Williams, Jack Williams.	
2003	The Amerdings (Jake Armerding, Rachel Davis, Kris Delmhorst, and Mark Erelli), Joan Armatrading, Alison Brown, Sam Bush, Guy Clark and Joe Ely, Slaid Cleaves, Ani DiFranco, Mary Gauthier, The Georgia Sea Island Singers, Eliza Gilkyson, Michael Fracasso, John Hiatt, Sarah Lee Guthrie & Johnny Irion, Angélique Kidjo, Jimmy LaFave, Lake Effect, Lyle Lovett, The Mammals, Keb' Mo', Aimee Mann, Tift Merritt, Nickel Creek, Out of the Blue (Ray Bonneville, Precious Bryant, John Herald, and David Jacobs-Strain), Ellis Paul, John Prine, Kim Richey, Sol y Canto, The Ben Taylor Band, Troupe Baden'ya, The Waifs, Dan Zanes.	
2004	Laura Cantrell, Slaid Cleaves, Laura Cortese and Ten Brooks, Crosby, Stills & Nash, Crooked Still, The Dixie Hummingbirds with Levon Helm and Garth Hudson, Lila Downs, Steve Earle, Corey Harris, Mary Jane Lamond, Vusi Mahlasela, The Mammals, Lori McKenna, Old Crow Medicine Show, Ollabelle, Joan Osborne, Rufus Wainwright with Kate McGarrigle, Ron Sexsmith, Darden Smith, Mindy Smith, Chip Taylor and Carrie Rodriguez, Doc Watson, Wilco, Lucinda Williams, Adrienne Young and Little Sadie.	
2005	Bright Eyes, Caitlin Cary, Kasey Chambers, Thad Cockrell, Elvis Costello and the Imposters, Béla Fleck, Foghorn Stringband, Patty Griffin, Arlo Guthrie, Nanci Griffith, Sarah Lee Guthrie & Johnny Irion, Emmylou Harris, The Holmes Brothers, Jim James, Kaki King, The Kennedys, Ray LaMontagne, Jim Lauderdale, The Lonesome Sisters, The Mammals, Buddy Miller, Del McCoury, Old Crow Medicine Show, Old School Freight Train, Pixies, Jane Siberry, Richard Thompson, Teddy Thompson, M. Ward.	
2006	Riley Baugus, Beòlach, Blou, Rosanne Cash, Cherish the Ladies, The Duhks, David Gray, Tim Eriksen and Sharp Note, Jeffrey Foucault, Indigo Girls, Mary Gauthier, Hot Toddy, Sonya Kitchell, Sonny Landreth, Patty Larkin, Bettye LaVette, The Meters, Odetta, Madeleine Peyroux, Grace Potter and the Nocturnals, David Rawlings with Gillian Welch, Darrell Scott, Chris Smither, Rosalie Sorrels, Ronan Tynan, Keller Williams, The Wood Brothers.	
2007	The Allman Brothers Band, Duane Andrews Trio, Rani Arbo and Daisy Mayhem, Assembly of Dust, John Butler Trio, Carolina Chocolate Drops, Dudley Connell, Dirty Dozen Brass Band, Alejandro Escovedo, Emmylou Harris, Sierra Hull and Highway 11, Amos Lee, Julie Lee, The Lonesome Brothers, Diana Jones, Alison Krauss & Union Station with Jerry Douglas, The MacKenzie Project, The Nightwatchman, North Mississippi Allstars, Elvis Perkins, Phonograph, Grace Potter and the Nocturnals, Linda Rondstadt, Ralph Stanley and the Clinch Mountain Boys, Vishtèn, Martha Wainwright with Sloan Wainwright and Lucy Wainwright Roche, Cheryl Wheeler.	
2008	Trey Anastasio, The Avett Brothers, The Black Crowes, Jimmy Buffett, Calexico, Brandi Carlile, Cat Power, Cowboy Junkies, Jakob Dylan, Steve Earle and Allison Moorer, The Felice Brothers, Jesca Hoop, Jim James, Richard Julian, Kaki King, Richie Havens, Levon Helm, Stephen and Damian Marley, Willy Mason, Over the Rhine, Red Rooster, She & Him, Jake Shimabukuro, Son Volt, Kate Taylor, Gillian Welch, Brian Wilson, Young@Heart Chorus.	
2009	The Avett Brothers, Joan Baez, Balfa Toujours, Billy Bragg, The Campbell Brothers, Neko Case, Dala, The Decemberists, Deer Tick, Brett Dennen, Ramblin' Jack Elliott, Tim Eriksen and Sharp Note Singers, Arlo Guthrie, Fleet Foxes, Iron & Wine, Ben Kweller, The Low Anthem, Del McCoury, Tift Merritt, The Nightwatchman, Elvis Perkins, Joe Pug, Dave Rawlings Machine, Josh Ritter, Tao Rodriguez-Seeger, Pete Seeger with Judy Collins, Langhorne Slim, Mavis Staples, Gillian Welch.	

=== 2010s ===
Year	Lineup	Ref.
2010	The Avett Brothers, Andrew Bird, Blitzen Trapper, A. A. Bondy, Sam Bush, Calexico, Brandi Carlile, Cory Chisel and The Wandering Sons, Dawes, Justin Townes Earle, The Felice Brothers, Richie Havens, Levon Helm, Horse Feathers, Sarah Jarosz, Jim James, Sharon Jones & the Dap-Kings, Pokey LaFarge, Liz Longley, The Low Anthem, Steve Martin and the Steep Canyon Rangers, Nneka, Tim O'Brien, O'Death, Preservation Hall Jazz Band, John Prine, Punch Brothers, Tao Seeger Band, Edward Sharpe and the Magnetic Zeroes, Ben Sollee and Daniel Martin Moore, The Swell Season, Doc Watson and David Holt.	
2011	Brown Bird, Carolina Chocolate Drops, The Cave Singers, The Civil Wars, Elvis Costello, David Wax Museum, The Decemberists, Delta Spirit, The Devil Makes Three, Justin Townes Earle, The Ebony Hillbillies, Ramblin' Jack Elliott, The Felice Brothers, Freelance Whales, Gogol Bordello, John Gorka, Emmylou Harris, The Head and the Heart, Wanda Jackson, Pokey LaFarge, Amos Lee, Middle Brother, Mountain Man, Ellis Paul, PS22 Chorus, Liz Queler, River City Extension, The Seeger Clogging All-Stars, The Secret Sisters, Earl Scruggs, Mavis Staples, Tegan and Sara, Trampled by Turtles, Typhoon, The Wailin' Jennys, M. Ward, Gillian Welch, What Cheer? Brigade, Dar Williams.	
2012	Alabama Shakes, The Apache Relay, The Berklee City Music Choir, Blind Pilot, Charles Bradley, Carl Broemel, Brown Bird, Jackson Browne, City and Colour, Gary Clark Jr., Jonny Corndawg, Dawes, The Deep Dark Woods, Deer Tick, Robert Ellis, Frank Fairfield, First Aid Kit, Joe Fletcher and the Wrong Reasons, Patty Griffin, Guthrie Family Reunion with Arlo Guthrie, The Head and the Heart, Honeyhoney, Iron & Wine, Spider John Koerner and His Rag Tag Boys, Kossoy Sisters, New Multitudes (Jay Farrar, Jim James, Will Johnson, and Anders Parker), Elizabeth Mitchell, Tom Morello, My Morning Jacket, Conor Oberst, Of Monsters and Men, Punch Brothers, Preservation Hall Jazz Band, Joel Rafael, Sleepy Man Banjo Boys, Spirit Family Reunion, The Tallest Man on Earth, Trampled by Turtles, Tune-Yards, Sara Watkins, Jonathan Wilson, Sharon Van Etten.	
2013	The Avett Brothers, Rayland Baxter, Beck, Berklee Gospel and Roots Choir, Andrew Bird, Black Prairie, Nicki Bluhm and the Gramblers, Bombino, Bonnie "Prince" Billy and Dawn McCarthy, Cold Specks, Iris DeMent, Justin Townes Earle, Feist, The Felice Brothers, Joe Fletcher, Hey Marseilles, Houndmouth, Hurray for the Riff Raff, Michael Hurley, Jason Isbell, Kingsley Flood, Michael Kiwanuka, Sarah Jarosz, Jim James, The Last Bison, Lord Huron, The Low Anthem, The Lumineers, John McCauley, JD McPherson, Colin Meloy, Tift Merritt, The Milk Carton Kids, Blake Mills, Father John Misty, Elizabeth Mitchell, The Mountain Goats, Old Crow Medicine Show, Beth Orton, Amanda Palmer, Phosphorescent, Shovels & Rope, Langhorne Slim, Spirit Family Reunion, Trombone Shorty, Frank Turner, Wheeler Brothers.	
2014	Ryan Adams, Ages and Ages, Band of Horses, Benjamin Booker, Berklee Gospel and Roots Choir, Jimmy Cliff, Dawes, Death Vessel, Deer Tick, The Deslondes, The Devil Makes Three, Shakey Graves, Noah Gundersen, The Haden Triplets, Houndmouth, Hozier, Robert Hunter, Hurray for the Riff Raff, Gregory Alan Isakov, Valerie June, Pokey LaFarge, Lake Street Dive, Jenny Lewis, The Lonesome Trio, Lucero, Lucius, Mandolin Orange, The Milk Carton Kids, Anaïs Mitchell and Jefferson Hamer, Nickel Creek, Conor Oberst, Aoife O'Donovan, The Oh Hellos, Phox, Puss n Boots, John C. Reilly, Reignwolf, Rodrigo y Gabriela, Caitlin Rose, Shovels & Rope, Mavis Staples, Sun Kil Moon, Tall Tall Trees, Thao & The Get Down Stay Down, Jeff Tweedy, Kurt Vile and the Violators, Leif Vollebekk, J Roddy Walston and the Business, Willie Watson, Jack White, Pegi Young and the Survivors.	
2015	Courtney Barnett, Jon Batiste, Leon Bridges, Calexico, Brandi Carlile, The Decemberists, Brian Fallon, The Felice Brothers, First Aid Kit, Béla Fleck and Abigail Washburn, José González, Shakey Graves, Robyn Hitchcock, Hiss Golden Messenger, Hozier, Lord Huron, Jason Isbell, Iron & Wine and Ben Bridwell, The Lone Bellow, Laura Marling, J Mascis, My Morning Jacket, Angel Olsen, Preservation Hall Jazz Band, Joe Pug, Nathaniel Rateliff and the Night Sweats, Langhorne Slim, Spirit Family Reunion, Sturgill Simpson, Sufjan Stevens, Tommy Stinson, The Tallest Man on Earth, James Taylor, Madisen Ward and the Mama Bear, Roger Waters.	
2016	Ryan Adams, Alabama Shakes, Ruby Amanfu, The Arcs, Julien Baker, Rayland Baxter, Basia Bulat, case/lang/veirs, Elvis Costello, Brett Dennen, Brian Fallon, Flight of the Conchords, Frightened Rabbit, Fruit Bats, Glen Hansard, Norah Jones, Lady Lamb, Ray LaMontagne, Del McCoury and David Grisman, Middle Brother, Father John Misty, John Moreland, Graham Nash, Aoife O'Donovan, Preservation Hall Jazz Band, Margo Price, Nathaniel Rateliff and the Night Sweats, Raury, River Whyless, Edward Sharpe and the Magnetic Zeros, Patti Smith, Songhoy Blues, The Strumbellas, The Texas Gentlemen with Joe Ely and Kris Kristofferson, Violent Femmes.	
2017	The Avett Brothers, Big Thief, Billy Bragg and Joe Henry, Chicano Batman, Dr. Dog, Drive-By Truckers, Rhiannon Giddens, Ben Gibbard, Margaret Glaspy, Grandma's Hands Band (Justin Vernon with Natalie Prass, Patterson Hood, and Hiss Golden Messenger), Hurray for the Riff Raff, I'm With Her, Julia Jacklin, Fleet Foxes, Michael Kiwanuka, Jim James, Mandolin Orange, Offa Rex (The Decemberists with Olivia Chaney), Angel Olsen, Pinegrove, John Prine with Roger Waters and Lucius, Shovels & Rope, Regina Spektor, Suzanne Vega, John Paul White, Whitney, Wilco.	
2018	Nicole Atkins, Courtney Barnett, Jon Batiste and the Dap-Kings, Phoebe Bridgers, Brandi Carlile, Kiki Cavazos, Cheech & Chong, Gary Clark Jr., Nels Cline, Jen Cloher, Fantastic Negrito, Shakey Graves, Ben Harper and Charlie Musselwhite, Curtis Harding, Hiss Golden Messenger, Glen Hansard, Jason Isbell & The 400 Unit with David Crosby, Valerie June, Hamilton Leithauser and Rostam, The Lone Bellow, Low Cut Connie, Lucius, JD McPherson, Mumford & Sons, Lukas Nelson & Promise of the Real, Margo Price, Passenger, Preservation Hall Jazz Band, Amanda Shires, Sturgill Simpson, Langhorne Slim, St. Vincent, Moses Sumney, Tank and the Bangas, This Is the Kit, Toots and the Maytals, Tuck & Patti.	
2019	Trey Anastasio, Courtney Marie Andrews, Rayland Baxter, Jade Bird, Bonny Light Horseman, Cedric Burnside, John Cohen, Judy Collins, Liz Cooper & The Stampede, Charley Crockett, Sheryl Crow, Dawes, The Down Hill Strugglers, Lucy Dacus, Ramblin' Jack Elliott, Alice Gerrard, Warren Haynes, Ari Hest, Haley Heynderickx, The Highwomen, Hozier, I'm with Her, The Infamous Stringdusters, Gregory Alan Isakov, Jupiter & Okwess, Lake Street Dive, Phil Lesh, Kermit the Frog (with Chris Funk, Jim James, John Stirratt, Benmont Tench, and Janet Weiss), Stephen Marley, Angie McMahon, The Milk Carton Kids, Parker Millsap, Kevin Morby, Mountain Man, Kacey Musgraves, Lukas Nelson & Promise of the Real, Noname, J.S. Ondara, Our Native Daughters (Rhiannon Giddens, Allison Russell, Leyla McCalla, and Amythyst Kiah), Dolly Parton, Phosphorescent, Portugal. The Man, Preservation Hall Jazz Band, Erin Rae, Amy Ray, Maggie Rogers, Todd Snider, Billy Strings and Molly Tuttle, Susto, Benmont Tench, Jeff Tweedy, Adia Victoria, Nilüfer Yanya, Yola.	

=== 2020s ===
Year	Lineup	Ref
2020	Festival canceled due to the COVID-19 pandemic.	
2021	Courtney Marie Andrews, Fred Armisen, Julien Baker, Beck, Andrew Bird and Jimbo Mathus, Bleachers, Bonny Light Horseman, Brothers of a Feather (Chris and Rich Robinson), Tré Burt, Caamp, Celisse, Lucy Dacus, Deer Tick, Dimmer Twins (Mike Cooley and Patterson Hood), Early James, Fruit Bats, Ben Gibbard, Devon Gilfillian, S.G. Goodman, Steve Gunn, Natalie Hemby, Hiss Golden Messenger, Ida Mae, The Marcus King Band, Lake Street Dive, Black Joe Lewis, Middle Brother, Kevin Morby, Randy Newman, Aoife O'Donovan, Joy Oladokun, Grace Potter, Margo Price, Katie Pruitt, Erin Rae with Haley Heynderickx and MC Taylor, Nathaniel Rateliff and the Night Sweats, Resistance Revival Chorus, Allison Russell with Chaka Khan and Amythyst Kiah, Jonathan Russell, Langhorne Slim, Billy Strings, Emma Swift, Chris Thile, Vagabon, Sharon Van Etten, Sunny War, Watchhouse, Waxahatchee, Yasmin Williams, Yola with Brandi Carlile.	
2022	The A's (Amelia Meath and Alexandra Sauser-Monnig), Arooj Aftab, American Tune Review (Nathaniel Rateliff and the Night Sweats with Courtney Marie Andrews, Lee Fields, Lucius, Natalie Merchant, Midlake, Marcus Mumford, Lukas Nelson, The Silk Road Ensemble, Paul Simon, and Adia Victoria), The Backseat Lovers, The Ballroom Thieves, Courtney Barnett, Black Opry Revue, Bleachers, Carm, Clairo, Phil Cook's Love Will Go All the Way: A Spiritual Helpline Gospel Revue, John Craigie, Lucy Dacus, DakhaBrakha, The Dead Tongues, Madi Diaz, Dinosaur Jr., The Felice Brothers, Sierra Ferrell, Lee Fields, Béla Fleck with Sam Bush and Jerry Douglas, Bendigo Fletcher, Neal Francis, Hannah Georgas, Taylor Goldsmith, Goose, Hermanos Gutiérrez, Hurray for the Riff Raff, Japanese Breakfast, Cassandra Jenkins, Valerie June, The Linda Lindas, Lucius, Taj Mahal, Árný Margrét, Midlake, Blake Mills, Anaïs Mitchell, Joni Mitchell and Brandi Carlile (with Phil and Tim Hanseroth, Celisse Henderson, Allison Russell, Lucius, Blake Mills, Taylor Goldsmith, Marcus Mumford, and Wynonna Judd), John Moreland, Maren Morris, The National, Buffalo Nichols, Joy Oladokun, The Roots, Leith Ross, The Silk Road Ensemble with Rhiannon Giddens, Langhorne Slim, Skullcrusher, Sylvan Esso, Faye Webster, Adia Victoria.	
2023	Abraham Alexander, The Backseat Lovers, Jon Batiste, The Beths, Black Opry Revue, Dan Blakeslee, Caamp, Willi Carlisle, Madison Cunningham, Indigo De Souza, Lana Del Rey, The Earls of Leicester, Eastern Medicine Singers with Yonatan Gat and Lee Ranaldo, Free Range, Ron Gallo, Goose, The Harlem Gospel Travelers, The Heavy Heavy, The Hold Steady, The Huntress and Holder of Hands, Gregory Alan Isakov, Jason Isbell & The 400 Unit, Jupiter & Okwess, Laden Valley, Dawn Landes, Los Lobos, Alice Phoebe Lou, Aimee Mann, Senora May, Mereba, Mdou Moctar, My Morning Jacket, Nanna, Nickel Creek, John Oates and Guthrie Trapp, Angel Olsen, Peter One, Orchestra Gold, Danielle Ponder, Maggie Rogers, Thee Sacred Souls, Slaughter Beach, Dog, Bartees Strange, Billy Strings, Sumbuck, James Taylor, Turnpike Troubadours, M. Ward, Bella White, Remi Wolf, Jaime Wyatt.	
2024	Joan Baez (poetry reading), Beck, Bertha: Grateful Drag, Black Pumas, Billy Bragg, Briscoe, Tré Burt, Chaparelle, John Craigie and Langhorne Slim, Madison Cunningham and Andrew Bird, The Breeders, De La Soul, Dropkick Murphys, Ocie Elliott, Erin, Mat & Paul (Erin Rae, Mat Davidson, and Paul Defiglia), Sierra Ferrell, Friko, Rhiannon Giddens, Guster, Oliver Hazard, Samm Henshaw, Hermanos Gutiérrez, Brittany Howard, Hozier, Killer Mike, Josiah & The Bonnevilles, Elle King, LA LOM, Adrianne Lenker, Taj Mahal, Billie Marten, Medicine Singers with Yonatan Gat and Lee Ranaldo, Buck Meek, Mighty Poplar, Muna, New Dangerfield, November Ultra, Number One Babe, Conan O'Brien (with Jack White, Dawes, Jimmy Vivino, Mavis Staples, Nick Lowe, Nathaniel Rateliff, Langhorne Slim, and Brittany Howard), The Oh Hellos, Palmyra, Orville Peck, Petey, Steve Poltz, William Prince, Reyna Tropical, Jobi Riccio, Mitch Rowland, Shovels & Rope, Sir Woman, Thao, Tinariwen, Molly Tuttle & Golden Highway, Wednesday, The War on Drugs, Gillian Welch and David Rawlings, Cory Wong (with Sierra Hull, Victor Wooten, Theo Katzman, Nate Smith, and Ariel Posen).	
2025	Alex G, Tyler Ballgame, BCUC, Big Freedia, Bleachers (with Maren Morris, Dan Reeder, Jeff Tweedy, Rufus Wainwright, Waxahatchee, Weyes Blood, and Hayley Williams), Bonny Light Horseman, Mary Chapin Carpenter, Hannah Cohen, Luke Combs, Kim Deal, Dehd, The Deslondes, Flipturn, Robert Lester Folsom, Geese, S.G. Goodman, Goose, Hurray for the Riff Raff, Illiterate Light, I'm With Her, Iron & Wine, Tyler-James Kelly, The Lemonheads, Lucius, MJ Lenderman, Jensen McRae, Mon Rovîa, Kevin Morby, Mt. Joy, Kenny Loggins, Maren Morris, Nova One, Lukas Nelson, Obongjayar, Tom Odell, Ken Pomeroy, Jessica Pratt, Margo Price, Public Enemy, Sammy Rae & The Friends, Dan Reeder, Richy Mitch & the Coal Miners, Maggie Rose, SNACKTIME, Songs for the People (Josh Kaufman with Matt Berninger, Mary Chapin Carpenter, Phil Cook, S.G. Goodman, Sarah Jarosz, Bridget Kearney, Maren Morris, John C. Reilly, and Matthew Logan Vasquez), The Swell Season, Jeff Tweedy, The Union featuring Phil Cook, Waxahatchee, Jesse Welles, Stephen Wilson Jr., Cameron Winter, Remi Wolf, Yeah Yeah Yeahs.	
2026	Amble, Courtney Marie Andrews, Courtney Barnett, The Barr Brothers, Tim Bernardes, Brother Wallace, Brandi Carlile, Cat Power, Clover County, CMAT, Mark Cutler, Lucy Dacus, Brittany Davis and Black Thunder, Ryan Davis & the Roadhouse Band, Dawes, Deer Tick and friends, Kathleen Edwards, Dove Ellis, The Fearless Flyers, Brandon Flowers, Hudson Freeman, Fruit Bats, Haley Heynderickx and Max García Conover, Lauryn Hill, Evan Honer, Honest Charlie, Hot Tuna, Infinity Song, Kirby, Lizzy McAlpine, The Lumineers, Father John Misty, Medium Build, Tom Morello, The Olllam, Punch Brothers, Princess June, Matt Quinn, Nathaniel Rateliff (with Courtney Marie Andrews, Joan Baez, Brandi Carlile, Brandon Flowers, Dave Matthews, David Rawlings, John C. Reilly, Mavis Staples, and Gillian Welch), Peter Rowan (with Sam Grisman, Sierra Hull, Larry Campbell, and Teresa Williams), Michael Shannon and Jason Narducy, Strongboi, This is Lorelei, Tiny Habits, Trousdale, Leif Vollebekk, Vulfpeck, Wednesday, Gillian Welch and David Rawlings, Hayley Williams (with Jack Antonoff, Liam Benzvi, Lucy Dacus, Madi Diaz, Annie DiRusso, Karly Hartzman, Jenny Lewis, Kelsey Lu, Joy Oladokun, Phoenix Rousiamanis, This is Lorelei, and Remi Wolf), Yasmin Williams and William Tyler.	
