= Roots revival =

Musical trend

A roots revival (folk revival) is a trend which includes young performers popularizing the traditional musical styles of their ancestors. Often, roots revivals include an addition of newly composed songs with socially and politically aware lyrics, as well as a general modernization of the folk sound.

The term roots revival is vague, and may not always refer to identical events. Characteristics associated with a roots revival include:

- Popularization of previously non-mainstream and independent of folk music
- Adaptation of folk styles to pop (or rock) structures
- Invention of new formats like bands where only solo acts had existed before
- Introduction of new instruments
- Composition of works by those who perform them, as opposed to folk tunes mostly passed down orally (see singer-songwriter)
- Incorporation of politically aware lyrics, often critical of a government, religion, or other authority, or society in general
- Lyrics are the first from the nation to express more than simple desires and problems, and are often seen as the embodiment of a national character or literary tradition (in comparison to the legendary American songwriter, such composers are often said to be the "Bob Dylan" of a particular variety, as in Wannes Van de Velde is the Belgian Bob Dylan)
- Roots revival performers will often come from very different social and economic backgrounds compared to the people whose style of music they are popularizing.

With such a vague and variable definition, roots revival could be seen as referring to the creation of any kind of pop music industry, though there are countries with well-developed pop traditions that have not had a period referred to as a roots revival (such as Jamaica, India, Cuba, and Kenya). For example, homogenized pop has long had its fans in most every country in the world, but many of these nations have created their own indigenous pop styles out of folk music; this process could be called a roots revival, though in some cases the folk musics in question were still widespread and did not need to be revived.

== History ==
The British folk revival was an academic movement to transcribe and record traditional British songs during the late 19th and early 20th century. Pioneers of this movement were the Harvard professor Francis James Child (1825–96), compiler of The English and Scottish Popular Ballads (1882–92), Sabine Baring-Gould (1834–1924), Frank Kidson (1855–1926), Lucy Broadwood (1858–1939), and Anne Gilchrist (1863–1954). The Folk Song Society was founded in 1898 to promote this new endeavour. A major figure in this movement was Cecil Sharp who was the most influential on the repertoire of subsequent performers and defining the nature of folk song. His lectures and other publications attempted to define a musical tradition that was rural in origin, oral in transmission and communal in nature.

The American folk music revival, which focused on culture and entertainment, began in the 1930s and 1940s. During the Great Depression, folk music styles were disseminated around the country, as Delta blues, Latino and Cajun musicians, and itinerant honky tonk singers spread to cities like Chicago, Los Angeles, and New York City. The growth of the music industry in the same period was also important; higher potential profits from music placed pressure on artists, songwriters, and label executives to replicate previous hit songs. This meant that musical fads, such as Hawaiian slack-key guitar, never died out completely, since a broad range of rhythms, instruments, and vocal stylings were incorporated into disparate popular genres.

The movement became global in the 1960s and 1970s. In most cases, the folk songs being revived were not quite extinct, though some had not been played for years or were moribund; such cases include the Celtic songs of Cornwall and the Isle of Man, for example. In other cases, such as Cameroon and the Dominican Republic, no revival was necessary as the music remained common, and was merely popularized and adapted for mainstream audiences at home and abroad.

== Roots revivals ==
Algerian music: Beginning as early as 1964, gaining steam in the 1970s and continuing through the 1980s, a mainstream raï revival occurred, and pop-raï stars like Khaled and Chaba Fadela gained worldwide audiences; the same period saw similar trends occur among Kabyle musicians such as Idir, Ferhat and Lounis Ait Menguellet, who popularized the native sounds of their people

Belgian music: Starting early in the 1960s, a wave of popular folk-based performers emerged, led by Wannes Van de Velde, who drew primarily on Flemish traditions. By the 1980s, popular bands included Brabants Volksorkest and the folk rock band Kadril.

Beninese music: Artists like Tohon Stan have created a popular version of Benin's numerous styles of indigenous folk music, such as tchink-system, a derivative of the funeral genre of tchinkoumé

Cambodian music: The early 1960s saw a revival of classical music and dance, inspired by Princess Norodom Buppha Devi and led by Sinn Sisamouth, though the rise of the Khmer Rouge largely ended this trend.

Cameroonian music: Beginning with bikutsi in the 1950s and continuing with makossa into the end of the 20th century, Cameroon's popularized folk musics have become among the most prominent in Africa. Messi Me Nkonda Martin undoubtedly did the most to evolve bikutsi from its folk origins into a popular style using electric guitars and other importations, while Manu Dibango brought makossa to new audiences around the world.

Chinese music: Partially as a reaction against attempts by the Communist government to use traditional styles to drum up patriotism and loyalty, the 1970s saw the creation of Chinese rock and Cantopop (in Hong Kong), both of which made some use of native folk styles, especially in vocal techniques. The leader of Chinese rock is undoubtedly Cui Jian.

Ivorian music: Ernesto Djédjé's ziglibithy style incorporates a number of folk genres from across Côte d'Ivoire, a diverse country with hundred of ethnic groups; Djédjé's most immediate influence was the folk rhythms of the Bété.

Croatian music: By the 1980s, Croatian pop-folk had seen some mainstream success, and a wave of bands appeared, inspired by Vještice, who combined Međimurje folk music with rock in an innovative fusion of sounds.

Czech music: In 1966, the Porta Festival was held, and a wave of singer-songwriters inspired by the likes of American Pete Seeger arose.

Danish music: In contrast to its neighbors, Denmark did not see a Roots revival until the late 1990s, when performers like Morten Alfred Høirup gained a widespread following in the country.

Dutch music: The late 1960s saw a revival of Dutch folk music, led by performers like Gerard van Maasakkers; popularity was limited, and soon ended, though region of Friesland has maintained a strong traditional music scene.

Egyptian music: The city of Cairo is the most important center for Egyptian music, which includes a variety of popularized folk styles, including northern sawahii and southern saiyidi.

Finnish music: Finland's folk styles include a variety of national genres and ballads, while the traditional rhyming sleigh songs rekilaulu have become an integral part of many pop singers. In 1967, the Savonlinna Opera Festival, the first of several similar festivals, contributed to a revival of Finnish opera and other more traditional styles.

French music: Though many of France's regional styles have seen popularization, the most vibrant scene is undoubtedly the traditional music of Brittany. The region boasts a uniquely Celtic heritage, which has been emphasized by the revival since its beginnings in the early 1970s, led by Alan Stivell. Corsican music has also seen a revival, though with little popular success, concurrent with the rise of Corsican nationalism in the 1970s. In the same way Occitan music, has also seen a revival with Occitan nationalism and reviviscence of occitan speaking in 60's (politic crisis with Gaullists to a clash with French linguistic imperialism and conservative politics) See also the Québécois under Canadian music.

Galician music: Similar to other Celtic nations, traditional Galician gaita (bagpipe) can now be heard all over the country. It had a revival at the beginning of the 20th century and then again a stronger revival by the end of the dictatorship in Spain in the 1970s. Carlos Nuñez and Luar na Lubre are two of the big names. Nuñez was discovered by The Chieftains and has become of the best selling Galician folk musicians. Galician artists also participate in the Festival Interceltique de Lorient in Bretagne.

Gambian music: By the 1970s, Gambian musicians were mostly playing popular merengue or other styles. A visit by pop band The Super Eagles to London to record saw a change, as they were encouraged to continue their practice of Gambian folk. The band became known as Ifang Bondi, and their music was called Afro-Manding blues.

Garifuna music: Starting in the 1970s and continuing into the following decades, the Garifunas, an Afro-Caribbean people found throughout Central America, began turning to their native punta sound and creating popular styles like punta rock, which found an audience across the area. Pen Cayetano was the most important figure in this scene.

German music: Following the 1968 student revolution in West Germany, singer-songwriters playing a kind of expressive, melancholy music with traditional influences became popular. Due to governmental interference, East Germany did not see much of this influence until the mid-1970s.

Ghanaian music: Ghana is best known for the highlife style of music, which has been popular throughout the 20th century. By the late 1960s, however, the pop scene was dominated by generic guitar bands that imitated Western acts. The 1971 Soul to Soul festival, however, featured a number of African American musicians (like Wilson Pickett and Tina Turner), which had the effect of legitimizing African culture, thus causing a major roots revival that brought highlife to international audiences.

Greek music: The late 1960s and early 1970s coup repressed rembétika, a style which had developed earlier in the century. This oppression ironically created a major boom in popularity for the genre, which became associated with political resistance and rebellion. Singer-songwriters like Dionysis Savvopoulos also became wildly popular, and were seen as voices of the Greek nation.

Music of Israel: Early Zionist settlers in Palestine, as far back as the 1880s, sought to create a new mode of Jewish folk music that was based on Biblical musical modes that had long since been abandoned. These composers, who included Matityahu Shelem, Yedidia Admon, and many others, drew on Yemenite, Arabic and other antique sources to create a unique style that they considered a revival of ancient Jewish music. The songs that they and their followers composed constitute a canonical body of folk music called "Songs of the Land of Israel." These songs are still widely performed today by popular artists.

Another example of roots revival in Israel is the preservation of regional Jewish musical styles. The music of North African and Middle Eastern Jewish communities has morphed into an eclectic new style called "Muzika Mizrahit". Folksongs in Yiddish and Ladino have been revived and recorded by artists like Chava Alberstein and Yehoram Gaon. Yair Dalal incorporates stylistic elements of the music of his native Iraq in his synthetic musical style.

Italian music: The diverse regions of Italy are home to dozens of varieties of folk music. By the 1950s, their popularity was declining rapidly and a group of musicians and musicologists founded organizations like Istituto de Martino and Nuovo Canzoniere Italiano to help preserve folk cultures. The following decade saw a revival of a number of traditions, including Ciccio Busacca's fusions of Sicilian folk styles, central Italy's jazzy modern folk, pioneered by Canzoniere del Lazio, the re-appearance of the lira through the work of Re Niliu, the popularization of diverse genres of northern Italian music and some of the work of world-famous tenor Enrico Caruso, who revitalized Naples' canzone napoletana tradition. In contrast to many other countries', Italy's roots revival has resulted in very little mainstream success.

Japanese music: Though elements of traditional Japanese music can be found in some rock and pop from the country, the only major roots revival was Okinawan, and began in the late 1980s. Popularized Okinawan folk music includes genres like kawachi ondo and goshu ondo.

Korean music: In the early 1970s, a genre called t'ong guitar developed, performed by singer-songwriters inspired by the likes of American Bob Dylan and Joan Baez. Korean folk has seen little popular success, though there has been some for the pansori, nongak and sanjo styles.

Latvian music: Its traditional long suppressed or appropriated by the Soviet Union, Latvia's kokles (an instrument similar to a box zither) was revived and popularised in the 1970s, led by traditional suiti kokle player Jānis Poriķis and ethnomusicologist Valdis Muktupāvels.

Lithuanian music: The Soviet Union had sponsored some music festivals, such as the dainų šventės, but did not allow for much lyrical or musical innovation, and kept all songwriters from experimenting with politically aware and dissident lyrics. An active cultural rebellion occurred in the 1960s, based around a series of national music festivals and concerts.

Malian music: Cuban music had become extremely popular in Mali by the 1960s, and little folk music could compete. The country's second president, however, Moussa Traoré, encouraged the growth of a Malian music industry, resulting in a revival of some kinds of folk music, and a popularization led by Salif Keita. Later Fanto Sacko's bajourou music and wassoulou music also became popularized. However, by the 1980s, Malian pop had lost most traces of its folk origins and was simply dance music, even topping the European charts; another roots revival occurred, led by Guinean acoustic singer and kora player Jali Musa Jawara.

Mozambiquan music: Music was used in the 1960s by the independence movement in Mozambique. Leaders in this movement encouraged the growth of a national music industry. By the 1970s, native forms of music, such as marrabenta, had been popularized.

Russian music: Starting in about 1966, a group of bards arose, most prominently including Vladimir Vysotsky, and Vyacheslav Shchurov organized a number of concerts for folk singers. This led to a revival and revitalization of Russian folk songs, a trend which continued in ensuing decades.

Sami music: The Sami, an indigenous people found in central and northern Scandinavia, northern Finland and northwestern Russia, have a tradition of folk songs called joiks, which have been popularized by the likes of Mari Boine, who remains a legend in the field.

Slovenian music: in the 1950s, the so-called "folk popular music" emerged with groups like Avsenik and Lojze Slak band, based on modernized Slovenian-style polka. In the 1980s, a completely different trend emerged, based on more archaic folk music, usually from specific regions; and it was popularized by groups like Istranova (Slovenian Istria) and singer Vlado Kreslin (Prekmurje).

=== Latin America, Portugal and Spain ===
Argentine music: In the 1960s, Andean nationalism was spreading across Argentina, Chile, Bolivia and Peru. Argentina's nativist scene includes landmark performers like Mercedes Sosa and Atahualpa Yupanqui, who helped spawn the nueva canción scene.

Bolivian music: The 1950s saw an increase in nationalist identity surrounding the Quechua and Aymara peoples, and a number of intellectuals began associating themselves with folk music, clothing, cuisine and other elements. By the mid-1960s, a folk revival was blossoming, led by Edgar Jofré.

Brazilian music: Beginning in the 1950s and continuing for several decades, a multitude of Brazilian styles (most importantly samba) and imported American jazz combined to create the wildly popular bossa nova scene. This soon evolved into the politically charged Tropicalia genre, which starred controversial and acclaimed singer-songwriters Caetano Veloso and Gilberto Gil.

Chilean music: In the early to mid-1960s, the burgeoning nueva canción movement spread throughout Chile, Argentina, Bolivia and Peru, featuring a wave of singer-songwriters who incorporated folk elements and nationalist lyrics, often critical of governmental authorities, and achieved great acclaim. Violeta Parra is sometimes viewed as the founder of the scene, for she popularized Quechua and Aymara songs and provided an outlet for performances by future luminaries like Victor Jara.

Cuban music: By the 1960s, Cuban music had seen international success in the form of pop-mambo, chachacha and other genres, and many artists were disillusioned with these styles, which were seen as watered-down. A vanguard of singer-songwriters like Silvio Rodríguez and Pablo Milanés arose, composing politically aware songs in a style that came to be called Nueva Trova.

Dominican music: Merengue had been popular in the Dominican Republic for decades since evolving out of confusing folk origins, but did not truly become a form of pop music until the early 1960s, when legends like Johnny Ventura brought the music to new audiences at home and abroad.

Spanish music was incorporated into Spanish Baroque music in the harpsichord works of Soler. Later composers such as Albeniz, Falla, Rodrigo and Giuliani used the dance rhythms of Spain. The classical guitarists Andrés Segovia, John Williams and Julian Bream popularised the music through their recordings. Current popular folk musicians include Susana Seivane, Hevia and Milladoiro. A roots revival Nueva canción, which also evolved into new form of socially committed music occurred in several Spanish-speaking countries.

Portuguese music: In the 1960s and 1970s, José Afonso led a return to more traditionally styled fado music, which later evolved into a number of new song forms that incorporated socio-political lyrics and foreign influences.

=== English-speaking countries ===
Includes English and Celtic revivals
For additional Celtic music, see the French section above

American music: The American Folklore Society was founded in 1888. Some members, including Frank Clyde Brown, George Lyman Kittredge, and John Lomax began collecting and recording 'trivial' music of minority groups. During the late 1920s and early 1930s, performers such as A. P. Carter, Bascom Lamar Lunsford, Lesley Riddle, and Woody Guthrie specifically began to seek out traditional songs to incorporate them into their performance repertoire.

This revival of traditional music led to the American folk music revival that began in the 1940s, and resulted in a new genre, contemporary folk music. A group of American archivists and researchers that included John A. Lomax, his son Alan Lomax, poet Carl Sandburg, musician Charles Seeger, and others collected, recorded, and published old ballads, prison songs, Appalachian folk music and black blues. A number of performers influenced by traditional music, such as Pete Seeger, Josh White, Burl Ives, and The Weavers, enjoyed considerable commercial success in the 1940s. This, in turn, led to a broader commercial revival in the late 1950s through the mid-1960s, with performers like The Kingston Trio, Joan Baez, and Peter, Paul and Mary selling millions of record albums.

The folk revival in the US led to the creation of folk rock, a new genre that drew on songs and themes associated with folk music and arranged them with rock 'n' roll instruments. Many of the early artists and groups associated with the genre began as folk musicians, most notably Bob Dylan, Simon & Garfunkel, Roger McGuinn of the Byrds, and Jerry Garcia of The Grateful Dead. The 21st century saw a smaller revival of Appalachian folk music with the release of the 2000 motion picture soundtrack to "O Brother, Where Art Thou?". Singers such as Gillian Welch and Alison Krauss and the bluegrass performer Ralph Stanley were featured on the album.

Australian music: Beginning in the 1980s, Australian Aborigines began turning to their native styles of folk music, which were updated, creating popular bands and styles like Aboriginal rock.

Canadian music: Though some artists, like The Band, Neil Young and Joni Mitchell, had been integral parts of the 1960s American folk rock scene, Canada has seen its own distinctive revival of styles. This includes the late 1970s scene in Maritime Canada, which glorified the area's Celtic heritage and was led by regional legends Figgy Duff and Stan Rogers, as well as the mid-1960s Quebecois revival led by Gilles Vigneault. There were also revivals of Acadian, Inuit and other folk styles. In the 1950s and 1960s dedicated folk music collectors spread out across the country to record traditional music. The songs and tunes were popularized on public radio by performers such as Alan Mills, Stu Davis, Marg Osborne, and the Travellers. A number of musicians who grew up listening to this traditional music became singer-songwriters in the 1970s; for example, Gordon Lightfoot and Ian and Sylvia.

English music: There were two folk music revivals in England. The first, led by Cecil Sharp, was academic. It involved the collection of songs and tunes and their publication in journals. It was at its peak about 1910. The second revival involved large-scale public performances of English music, beginning with the appearance of the Copper Family at the Royal Albert Hall in 1952, together with a proliferation of folk clubs meeting mainly in the upper rooms of public houses. Starting in the late 1960s the songs were performed in a contemporary style; this was the origin of the British folk rock style.

Irish music: There was a revival of Irish folk music that began in the early 20th century, based both in Dublin and Ireland, though the longer-lasting and more famous revival began in 1955 with the album "The Lark in the Morning", whose recording was supervised by Diane Hamilton and which featured Liam Clancy and Tommy Makem prior to their involvement with the influential but U.S.-based Clancy Brothers and Tommy Makem. Later famous groups include The Dubliners (founded 1962), The Chieftains (1963), Ceoltóirí Chualann, and Clannad (1973). Later, singer-songwriters such as Christy Moore were inspired by American popular folk singers, and they took to modernizing and adapting Irish music for modern audiences. The result was a dramatic change from folk traditions, including the introduction of the bouzouki and influences including soul and rock.

Scottish music: The Scottish folk revival begin in 1951 when Hamish Henderson created the People's Festival. The Boys of the Lough were one of the first instrumental Celtic groups to tour the world.

Transnational: During the 2010s, folk-inspired acts began to score chart hits in the UK, US and beyond. Most notably the UK group Mumford & Sons won the Grammy (US National Academy of Recording Arts and Sciences award) for best album in 2013.
