= In the Pines =

Traditional American folk song

"In the Pines" (Roud 3421), also known as "Where Did You Sleep Last Night?", "My Girl", "Hey Girl", or "Black Girl", is a traditional American folk song originating from two songs, "In the Pines" and "The Longest Train", both of whose authorship is unknown and date back to at least the 1870s. The songs originated in the Southern Appalachian area of the United States in the contiguous areas of East Tennessee and Kentucky, Western North Carolina and Northern Georgia.

Versions of the song have been recorded by many artists in numerous genres, but it was most often associated with American bluegrass musician Bill Monroe and American blues musician Lead Belly, both of whom recorded versions of the song in the 1940s, the latter of which inspired grunge band Nirvana's version of the song in the 1990s.

In 1964, a version of the song by English beat music group the Four Pennies reached the top-twenty in the United Kingdom. A live rendition by American grunge band Nirvana, based on Lead Belly's interpretation, was recorded during their MTV Unplugged performance in 1993, and released the following year on their platinum-selling album, MTV Unplugged in New York. The song was listed as "Where Did You Sleep Last Night?" on that album.

== Early history ==
Some versions includes a verse about "The longest train I ever saw". This verse probably began as a separate song that later merged into "In the Pines". Lyrics in some versions about "Joe Brown's coal mine" and "the Georgia line" may refer to Joseph E. Brown, a former governor of Georgia, who famously leased convicts to operate coal mines in the 1870s. While early renditions which mention the head in the "driver's wheel" make clear that the decapitation was caused by the train, some later versions would omit the reference to the train and reattribute the cause. As music historian Norm Cohen pointed out in his 1981 book, Long Steel Rail: The Railroad in American Folksong, the song came to consist of three frequent elements: a chorus about "in the pines", a verse about "the longest train" and a verse about a decapitation, but not all elements are present in all versions.

Starting in 1926, commercial recordings of the song were made by various country artists. In her 1970 Ph.D. dissertation, Judith McCulloh found 160 permutations of the song. As well as rearrangement of the three frequent elements, the person who goes into the pines, or who is decapitated, is described as a man, woman, adolescent, husband, wife, or parent, while the pines can be seen as representing sexuality, death, or loneliness. The train is described as killing a loved one, as taking one's beloved away, or as leaving an itinerant worker far from home.

The folk version by the Kossoy Sisters asks, "Little girl, little girl, where'd you stay last night? Not even your mother knows." The reply to the question, "Where did you get that dress/ And those shoes that are so fine?" from one version is, "From a man in the mines/Who sleeps in the pines."

== Later versions ==
=== Bill Monroe ===
Bill Monroe's 1941 and 1952 recordings, both under the title "In the Pines", were highly influential on later bluegrass and country versions. Recorded with his Bluegrass Boys and featuring fiddles and yodelling, they represent the "longest train" variant of the song, and omit any reference to a decapitation. However, as Eric Weisbard writes in a 1994 article in The New York Times, "...the enigmatic train is almost as frightening, suggesting an eternal passage: 'I asked my captain for the time of day/He said he throwed his watch away.'"

=== Lead Belly ===
Due to the popularity of Lead Belly's versions, he is often erroneously cited as the song's author, such as by Kurt Cobain, who introduced Nirvana's 1993 MTV Unplugged rendition as being by his "favorite performer," then telling an anecdote about attempting to purchase Lead Belly's guitar. According to the American folklorist Alan Lomax, Lead Belly learned the song from an interpretation of the 1917 version compiled by Cecil Sharp, and by the 1925 phonograph recording.

=== The Louvin Brothers ===
The country duo The Louvin Brothers recorded "In the Pines" for their debut album, Tragic Songs of Life, from 1956.

=== Norma Tanega ===
On her debut album, Norma Tanega recorded a version entitled "Hey Girl" (1966).

=== Mark Lanegan/Nirvana ===
"Where Did You Sleep Last Night"

Promotional single by Nirvana

from the album MTV Unplugged in New York
- Released: 1995
- Recorded: November 18, 1993
- Studio: Sony Music Studios in New York City
- Genre: Alternative rock, blues rock
- Length: 5:08
- Label: DGC Records
- Songwriter: Anon
- Producers: Alex Coletti, Scott Litt, Nirvana

Nirvana singles chronology
"The Man Who Sold the World" (1995)	"Where Did You Sleep Last Night" (1995)	"Lake of Fire" (1995)

MTV Unplugged in New York track listing
- 13 tracks: 1. "About a Girl"; 2. "Come as You Are"; 3. "Jesus Doesn't Want Me for a Sunbeam"; 4. "The Man Who Sold the World"; 5. "Pennyroyal Tea"; 6. "Dumb"; 7. "Polly"; 8. "On a Plain"; 9. "Something in the Way"; 10. "Plateau"; 11. "Oh, Me"; 12. "Lake of Fire"; 13. "All Apologies"; 14. "Where Did You Sleep Last Night"

Kurt Cobain of Nirvana played guitar on the version that appears on Mark Lanegan's 1990 album The Winding Sheet. It is likely that Cobain drew from Lead Belly's 1944 Musicraft version for his interpretation of the song; Lanegan owned an original 78 rpm record of this version, and it is the one that Cobain's version most closely resembles in terms of form, title and lyrics, including the "Shiver for me" interjection before the instrumental verse. In a 2009 MTV article, Kurt Loder remembers discussing the song's title with Cobain, with Cobain insisting, "But the Leadbelly version is called 'Where Did You Sleep Last Night,'" and Loder preferring the "In the Pines" title used by Bill Monroe (as well as Lead Belly).

The first officially released version by Nirvana was recorded during the band's MTV Unplugged appearance, on November 18, 1993, at Sony Music Studios in New York City. This version was originally sanctioned to be released, under the title "Where Did You Sleep Last Night (In the Pines)," as a b-side to the band's "Pennyroyal Tea" single in 1994, but the single was cancelled following Cobain's death in April 1994. It was instead posthumously released as simply "Where Did You Sleep Last Night" on the band's MTV Unplugged in New York album in November 1994, and as a promotional single from the album, receiving some airplay on US rock and alternative radio in 1994–95. The song also received some airplay in Belgium and France, as well as in Australia and Iceland.

==== Reception ====
Nirvana's MTV Unplugged version of the song has earned Cobain acclaim from critics and other musicians and artists. In 1994, American poet Allen Ginsberg recalled that "a couple weeks ago, one of my students gave me a mixed tape of Kurt Cobain and there was a version of 'Black Girl' of great artistry. Great vocal control and subtlety, it's almost as good as Leadbelly's." Canadian musician Neil Young described Cobain's vocals during the final screamed verse as "unearthly, like a werewolf, unbelievable." In 2013, Andrew Wallace Chamings of The Atlantic wrote that "it ranks among the greatest single rock performances of all time." The show's producer, Alex Coletti, recalled Cobain declining his suggestion to perform an encore after "Where Did You Sleep Last Night," which was the final song of the set, telling him that "I don’t think we can top the last song," at which point Coletti relented.

==== Charts ====
Chart (1995)	Peak position
Iceland (Íslenski Listinn Topp 40)	3

==== Certifications ====
Sales certifications for "Where Did You Sleep Last Night?"
Region	Certification	Certified units/sales
Australia (ARIA)	Platinum	70,000^{‡}
New Zealand (RMNZ)	Gold	15,000^{‡}
United Kingdom (BPI) Sales since 2004	Silver	200,000^{‡}
^{‡} Sales+streaming figures based on certification alone.

=== Other versions ===
- King Oliver's Creole Jazz Band recorded Where Did You Stay Last Night? in 1923, the b-side to "Dippermouth Blues".
- Dock Walsh recorded In the Pines for Columbia Records in 1926.
- Arthur Smith & His Dixie Liners released their version of "In the Pines" in 1938.
- The Kossoy Sisters recorded the song on their 1956 album Bowling Green and Other Folk Songs From the Southern Mountains.
- Joan Baez's version appears on the live album Very Early Joan Baez (1982) that was originally recorded between 1961 and 1963.
- The New Christy Minstrels (1962) included a version on their debut album Presenting the New Christy Minstrels.
- The Kentucky Colonels recorded their version, performed live at the 1964 Newport Folk Festival, on their album Long Journey Home.
- Marianne Faithfull recorded the song on her 1965 albums Come my Way and The Collection.
- Roscoe Holcomb recorded the song on his 1965 album The High Lonesome Sound.
- Norma Tanega recorded a version under the title "Hey Girl" on her 1966 album Walkin' My Cat Named Dog.
- Tiny Tim recorded a version of the song under the title "Little Girl" in 1966. It is thought that the song could be inspired by The Animals' cover of The House of the Rising Sun.
- Fred Neil's 1967 song "Merry Go Round" is loosely based on the traditional song.
- Long John Baldry's version appears on his 1971 album It Ain't Easy.
- Frank Sinatra Jr. recorded a version of the song, titled "Black Night", on his 1971 album Spice.
- Dolly Parton's version appears on her 1994 album Heartsongs: Live from Home.
- Anna Domino (as Snakefarm) recorded a version on the 1999 album Songs From My Funeral.
- Carl Rutherford recorded a version on his 2001 album, Turn Off the Fear.
- Bill Callahan (as Smog) recorded a version on his 2005 album A River Ain't Too Much to Love.
- Martin Simpson recorded a version titled "In the Pines" on his 2011 album Purpose + Grace.
- Laura Gibson's version appears as a B-side on her single 2012 La Grande.
- Kid Cudi and Dot da Genius, collectively known as WZRD, recorded a rendition of the song for their 2012 self-titled debut album.
- Watkins Family Hour performed a version of In the Pines on NPR's Tiny Desk series in 2015.
- Fantastic Negrito recorded his rendition of the song for his 2016 album, The Last Days of Oakland.
- Jake Blount's version appears on his 2020 debut solo album, Spider Tales.
- Danielle Balbuena, also known as 070 Shake, recorded a version of the song for her 2020 debut album, Modus Vivendi.
- Khemmis recorded a version in 2021, which appears on their 2023 mini-EP "Where the Cold Wind Blows".
- The Curse of K.K. Hammond self-released her version as a non-album single titled "In The Pines" in 2021.
- Loretta Lynn's version appears on the 2016 album Full Circle.
- Sleigh Bells recorded a version in 2019 as a stand-alone single.
- A version by Renée Fleming and Béla Fleck featuring Dolly Parton appeared on the 2026 album The Fiddle and the Drum.
- Eric Johanson recorded a version in 2021 on his "Covered Tracks Vol.2" album
- The folk punk band Sister Wife Sex Strike recorded a version mixed with the song "Wayfaring Stranger" called "In the Pines / Wayfaring Stranger" for their album "Sister Wives Strike Back (Deluxe)", released in 2023

== In popular culture ==
=== Literature ===
- In 2007, Czech-American writer-singer Natálie Kocábová used a strophe of "Where Did You Sleep Last Night" for the opening of her novella Růže: Cesta za světlem... ("Rose: A Way to the Light").
- "Shiver in the Pines" is the basis of a short story of the same name by Manly Wade Wellman, originally published in February 1955. The story is part of the John the Balladeer series.

=== Podcast ===
Since 2019, several different covers of “Where Did You Sleep Last Night” have been featured on the podcast Old Gods of Appalachia.

=== Games ===
- A rendition by Jared Emerson-Johnson and Janel Drewis is played during the closing credits of The Walking Dead: Season Two - Episode 2: A House Divided released in 2014. It is reprised in the fourth and final season of the game series.
- A version of the song, as of yet unidentified, can be found playing in certain parts of the Ubisoft video game Far Cry 5, released on March 27, 2018.

=== Film and television ===
- In The Defenders, an instrumental version of Nirvana's cover of the song plays in the cold open of episode 7, "Fish in the Jailhouse"
- In Blindspotting (2018), a version by Fantastic Negrito plays during the protagonist Collin's first day out of probation.
- Another version appears in the fashion brand Diesel’s 2020 TV commercial, Francesca, directed by Francois Rousselet. The story follows the journey of a young Italian student, assigned male at birth (played by transgender model Harlow Monroe), who transitions into a woman and ultimately becomes a Christian nun.
- The movie Girl ends with "The Pines" playing during the credits.
- A version by Brian Reitzell appears in the TV series American Gods.
- A version by Wanda Davis appears in episode 8 of season 1 of the TV series Bad Sisters.
- A portion of the Nirvana Unplugged recording is played in the BBC drama serial Happy Valley, series 3 episode 4.
- In the film Coal Miner's Daughter, Sissy Spacek as Loretta Lynn sings the song while taking a walk through the woods of Butcher Hollow, Kentucky before being interrupted by a gunshot from nearby hunters.
- An uncredited version is used as a theme tune for some episodes of Finnish thriller A Good Family
- The Sleigh Bells version was used at the end of The Rhythm Section (2020) and in The Penguin episode "A Great or Little Thing".
- The Netflix limited series, Wayward heavily features several renditions.
- In Hulu's Furious, episode 7.

== See also ==
- List of train songs
