= Diane Hamilton =

American mining heiress (1924–1991)

Diane Hamilton was the pseudonym of Diane Guggenheim (1924–1991), an American mining heiress, folksong patron and founder of Tradition Records.

== Personal life ==
The only child of millionaire Harry Frank Guggenheim, president of Newsday and onetime U. S. ambassador to Cuba, and his second wife, Caroline Morton (formerly Mrs. William Chapman Potter), Hamilton was born as Diana Guggenheim in New York City, New York, United States. She had two half-sisters, Joan (born 1913) and Nancy (1915–1972), from her father's first marriage to Helen Rosenberg.

Her maternal grandfather was Paul Morton, U. S. Secretary of the Navy, while her maternal great-grandfather was Julius Sterling Morton, U. S. Secretary of Agriculture.

She was married and divorced four times:

- Lieutenant John Meredith Langstaff, a U. S. Army officer and aspiring concert singer, married 1943. They had one child, Diane Carol Langstaff (Mrs Peter Duveneck, Mrs Jim Rooney).
- Robert Guillard.
- William Meek, an Irish journalist, whom she married in 1963. They had four children: Eoin Meek, Colm Meek, Sorcha Meek, and Caitriona Meek.
- John Darby Stolt, aka John Hamilton-Darby

== Career ==
Little is known of Hamilton's life, and only since the publication of the book The Mountain of the Women: Memoirs of an Irish Troubadour by Liam Clancy has it been possible to reconstruct her most notable years. In order to disguise her wealth, she adopted the alias 'Diane Hamilton'.

She lived in Florence, Italy, in the late 1950s, where she ran a Montessori school and frequented workshops led by Dr. Roberto Assagioli.

In 1955, she traveled to Ireland in search of folk singers. According to Liam Clancy's book, she became acquainted with Tom and Paddy Clancy in New York, and while in Ireland made the Clancy household one of the stops on her collecting trip. Young Liam was invited to continue on the trip with her, and one of the next stops was the home of Sarah Makem who had previously been recorded by Jean Ritchie on her album Field Trip (1954). This fateful meeting brought together Liam and Sarah's younger son, Tommy Makem, who was also recorded. These two, along with Liam's older brothers Paddy and Tom Clancy, would eventually form "The Clancy Brothers and Tommy Makem", one of the most successful groups in Irish music history.

The anthology Hamilton recorded in 1955 as The Lark in the Morning is the earliest album-length collection of Irish folk songs sung by Irish singers to be recorded in Ireland. Also on the album are Paddy Tunney and Tommy Makem, son of Sarah Makem. This album was re-released in a restored format in the late 1990s on the Rykodisc label.

== Tradition Records ==
Another member of the Clancy family, Paddy Clancy, helped Hamilton run Tradition Records as the company's president. The Lark in the Morning was the first album released on the Tradition label in 1955. Subsequent releases included The Rising of the Moon by The Clancy Brothers and Tommy Makem, and The Countess Cathleen by W. B. Yeats in 1956. Other notable recordings include Negro Prison songs, a compilation by Alan Lomax and The Bonny Bunch of Roses with Seamus Ennis. Other Tradition artists included Ed McCurdy, Odetta, Paul Clayton, Jean Ritchie, Lightnin' Hopkins and Etta Baker. In 1959 the label released John Langstaff Sings American and English Ballads, featuring her then-current husband singing and Nancy Trowbridge (who later became Langstaff's second wife) on piano. The album was re-released by Revels Records in 2002 as The Water Is Wide: American and British Ballads and Folksongs. Once the Clancy Brothers signed with Columbia Records in 1961, the catalogue was sold, possibly to Transatlantic.

In the 1970s, Hamilton was involved in the founding of the Mulligan record label, in Dublin. She may have regarded Dónal Lunny as the successor to Liam Clancy as the next standard-bearer of the authentic Irish traditional music heritage.

A passing reference to Hamilton in a California folk music magazine suggests that she was still active in Irish music as late as the early 1980s. The November/December 1982 issue of Folk Scene (Los Angeles) credits her with "the lion's share of the work" for the recording, in 1977, of the album The Gathering—released on the label Greenhays in 1981—which features the playing of Andy Irvine, Paul Brady, Dónal Lunny, Matt Molloy, Tommy Potts, Tríona Ní Dhomhnaill and uilleann piper Peter Browne.
