= Bowling Green (album) =

Studio album by Kossoy Sisters
- Released: 1956
- Recorded: August 1956
- Genre: Folk
- Length: 40:06
- Label: Tradition Records

Kossoy Sisters chronology
Bowling Green (1956)	Hop on Pretty Girls (2002)

Professional ratings
Review scores
Source	Rating
AllMusic	4/5 stars

Bowling Green and Other Folk Songs From the Southern Mountains is a 1956 album by the Kossoy Sisters, containing their renditions of Appalachian folk songs. The sisters sing in tight close harmony, with additional instrumental accompaniment by Erik Darling. Originally released on Tradition Records, the album was re-released on CD by Rykodisc in 1996.

The album's third track, "I'll Fly Away," was featured in the Coen Brothers' 2000 film O Brother, Where Art Thou?, although the movie's Grammy-winning soundtrack album substituted a different rendition of the song. The Kossoys' version of the Carter Family's "Single Girl, Married Girl" from this album is heard in the 2014 film Obvious Child.

== Track listing ==
No.	Title	Length
1.	"Bowling Green"	2:13
2.	"I Never Will Marry"	2:48
3.	"I'll Fly Away"	2:32
4.	"The Darby Ram"	2:54
5.	"In the Pines"	3:19
6.	"The Banks of the Ohio"	3:20
7.	"The Wagoner's Lad"	3:40
8.	"Poor Ellen Smith"	2:28
9.	"Single Girl"	2:16
10.	"What Will We Do with the Baby-O?"	1:47
11.	"Down in a Willow Garden"	2:34
12.	"Little Birdie"	2:56
13.	"Willie Moore"	3:06
14.	"Engine 143"	4:17
Total length:		40:06

== Personnel ==
- Irene Kossoy: vocals (low harmony), guitar
- Ellen Kossoy: vocals (high harmony), banjo
- Erik Darling: guitar, banjo
