= Single Girl, Married Girl =

Folk Song made famous by the Carter Family

- Folk song
- Text: Traditional
- Language: English
- Melody: Traditional
- Published: January 1928

Single Girl, Married Girl is a folk song made famous by The Carter Family, about the differences in lifestyle between the two title characters.

The song was originally released on Victor Records in January 1928 as the a-side of Victor 20937, the Carter Family’s second 78-rpm record for the label. It was recorded on August 2, 1927, the second day of their first session with producer and engineer Ralph Peer, and released in January 1928. This version was later included in Harry Smith’s Anthology of American Folk Music, Vol. 3. Notably, the song does not feature A.P. Carter, but is instead a solo by Sara Carter playing autoharp accompanied by her cousin Maybelle Carter playing lead guitar (Maybelle Carter used an inexpensive Stella guitar during the August 1-2, 1927 sessions).

The song was re-recorded during the last months of Sara and A.P. Carter’s marriage, on May 8, 1935, during a 4-day recording session with Ralph Peer. The tempo of this version is much slower, and Sara Carter sings at a much lower pitch. This version was first released on Arc Records, along with the song “No Other’s Bride I’ll Be,” as ARC 8733.

== Personnel ==
- Sara Carter: vocals, autoharp
- Maybelle Carter: guitar
- Ralph Peer: recording producer/engineer

== Versions ==
- The Haden Triplets on The Haden Triplets
- Charlie Haden Family and Friends on Rambling Boy
- Petra Haden on The Harry Smith Project: Anthology Of American Folk Music Revisited
- Jody Stecher and Kate Brislin on Songs of the Carter Family
- Levon Helm on Dirt Farmer
- Kossoy Sisters on Bowling Green
- Alex De Grassi on Now And Then: Folk Songs for the 21st Century
- Promise and the Monster on Transparent Knives
- 16 Horsepower on Folklore
- Peter, Paul and Mary on In Concert
