= Poor Ellen Smith =

19th-century murder ballad

Poor Ellen Smith (Roud 448) is an American murder ballad that originated in the late 19th century, recounting the shooting death of one Ellen Smith, and the trial and execution of her murderer, Peter de Graff. He apparently wrote the lyrics while awaiting execution by hanging in 1893 using a melody he purloined from the hymn "How Firm a Foundation".

The song is based on real events in Winston-Salem, North Carolina. In 1892, a ne'er-do-well named Peter DeGraff had a love affair with Ellen Smith, who may have been mentally challenged and was unable to understand his rejection of her. Smith became pregnant by DeGraff, but their child died at birth. Afterwards she began following DeGraff around town, and eventually he sent her a note that asked her to meet him in a secluded area, worded in such a way that Smith would have believed DeGraff wanted to reconcile. Instead, when she arrived, DeGraff shot her through the chest. He later reported that Smith's only words after being shot were "Lord have mercy on me." DeGraff confessed to the crime on the gallows, shortly before he was hanged.

The song and its variants have been performed and recorded by a range of artists including Tommy Jarrell, Neko Case, Laura Cantrell, Molly O'Day, Kristin Hersh, Wilma Lee & Stoney Cooper, Jimmy Martin, the Stanley Brothers, Ralph Stanley & Larry Sparks, the Kossoy Sisters, Billy Strings, The Country Gentlemen, John Hartford, The Kingston Trio, Crooked Still, Robert Earl Keen, Wussy, Gillian Welch and David Rawlings.

The plot was also adapted by German Folk-Metal band Subway to Sally in their song "Arme Ellen Schmitt".
