= One-Dime Blues =

Studio album by Etta Baker
- Released: 1991
- Recorded: 1988–1990
- Genre: Blues
- Label: Rounder
- Producer: Wayne Martin, Lesley Williams

Etta Baker chronology
Instrumental Music from the Southern Appalachians (1956)	One-Dime Blues (1991)	Railroad Bill (1999)

One-Dime Blues is an album by the American musician Etta Baker, released in 1991. Baker was awarded a National Heritage Fellowship the same year. She supported the album by making a few live appearances. One-Dime Blues was nominated for a W. C. Handy Award for best country blues album.

== Production ==
The album was produced by Wayne Martin and Lesley Williams. It was funded by the North Carolina Arts Council, which produced a documentary about Baker and One-Dime Blues. The recording sessions took place over 21 months, between 1988 and 1990. "But on the Other Hand Baby" is a cover of the Ray Charles song. Baker played clawhammer banjo on "Marching Jaybird". She sang on "Broken Hearted Blues", an original song.

== Critical reception ==
Professional ratings
Review scores
Source	Rating
AllMusic	4.5/5 stars
MusicHound Blues: The Essential Album Guide	4.5/5 stars
The News & Observer	4/4 stars
The Penguin Guide to Blues Recordings	4/4 stars

Spin wrote: "Extremely well polished, honest, and sensitive, her unique guitar sound is technically and spiritually magnificent." The News & Observer called the album "a powerful yet sensitive collection of mostly instrumental folk blues and parlor songs." The St. Louis Post-Dispatch deemed it "extremely folksy" blues. The Pittsburgh Press admired the "surprisingly strong vocal" on "Broken Hearted Blues".

The Asbury Park Press concluded that Baker's "impeccable fingering techniques ... prove there's more to the blues than a slashing slide guitar." The Washington Post determined that Baker's "sparse arrangements, leisurely tempos and light touch allow each melody note to shine, even as the harmony notes keep the music flowing ever forward."

AllMusic praised "the arresting vocals, prickly accompaniment, and commanding presence." Acoustic Guitar noted that "Baker's guitar work is characteristically deliberate, clear and lightly swinging whether she's addressing a blues, ragtime, or folk motif."

== Track listing ==
No.	Title	Length
1.	"Never Let Your Deal Go Down"
2.	"One-Dime Blues"
3.	"Knoxville Rag"
4.	"Broken-Hearted Blues"
5.	"Lost John"
6.	"Dew Drop"
7.	"Going Down the Road Feeling Bad"
8.	"Near the Cross I Watch and Pray"
9.	"Spanish Fandango"
10.	"Round My Back Door Selling Coal"
11.	"But on the Other Hand Baby"
12.	"Crow Jane"
13.	"John Henry"
14.	"Alabama Wagonwheel"
15.	"Bully of the Town"
16.	"Going to the Racetrack"
17.	"Police Dog Blues"
18.	"Marching Jaybird"
19.	"Railroad Bill"
20.	"Carolina Breakdown"
