= Brigid Tunney =

- Born: Brigid Gallagher; 1886; Rushen
- Origin: South Donegal
- Died: 1975 (aged 88–89) Garvery
- Genres: Folk
- Occupation: Singer
- Label: Folk Trax

Brigid Tunney (née Gallagher; 1886 – 1975) was an Irish traditional singer, probably best known for being the mother of Paddy Tunney, a key personality in the Irish music scene and well known in British Folk circles from the 1950s up until his death in 2002. She was the source of many of his songs and the chief influence on his singing style.

== Early years ==
Brigid was born in 1886, the second child and eldest daughter of Michael Gallagher and Mary Meehan. She grew up in the family home in Rushen in South Donegal. Her mother died when she was only eleven years old and Brigid became the homemaker, looking after her father and her brothers and sisters. Just before the First World War, she moved to Scotland and lived in Glasgow looking after her siblings who by then had emigrated to find work. In Glasgow in 1916, she married Patrick Tunney, a man who had grown up on a neighbouring farm back home. Their first child, Maureen, was born in Glasgow in December 1917. Two other children were born before their return to Donegal after the birth of Paddy, in 1921. Subsequently, they moved to the townland of Garvery in County Fermanagh. Brigid and Patrick Tunney had a further five children born in Ireland.

== Her songs and singing ==
Brigid learned many of her songs from the members of her extended family including her mother, maiden name Mary Meehan. She also picked up songs at house dances and parties. ‘She had no time for simple songs but loved those with the long, melodious line and the difficult air.’ Hence, her repertoire was replete with beautiful and often unusual songs. To varying degrees, all of her eight children (Maureen, Bridie, Phyllis, Joe, Annie, Michael, Tina, but especially Paddy) loved and sang their mother's songs. In his late teens, Paddy began to press her to teach him the lyrics, melodies and the way of singing them. He recalled learning ‘As I Roved Out’, later recorded by Planxty and many others, in these terms:

"Meadow Mane rippled with corncrakes and scythe steel sang to whetstone. The air ached with the pain and joy of loving. It was the time that turned my mother to songs of love and longing. She put aside the hoops that held the cloth, where her needle and thread had wrought the most exotic rosebuds, open flowers and intricate patterns, and wove with her voice arabesques of sound that bested the embroidery. She sang me for the first time that exquisitely beautiful song: As I Roved Out, or The False Bride."

== BBC recordings and wider influence ==
In 1952, when her son Paddy was contacted by Seán O Boyle and Peter Kennedy regarding being recorded for the BBC, he persuaded the folk collectors to travel to his home district of Mulleek in north-west Fermanagh where, over two days, he arranged to have as many of the local musicians and singers as possible lined up and ready to go. In his mind, getting his mother recorded was the most important aspect of the whole endeavour but many others were also recorded including Brigid's brother Michael Gallagher, her sons Joe and Mick, daughters Annie Lunny and Maureen Melly, and neighbouring musicians Philip Breen and Eddie Moore. The men from the BBC returned the following year and recorded further songs from Brigid and her brother. Peter Kennedy later released these under the Folk Trax label as an album entitled The Mountain Streams.

As well as having a profound influence on her son Paddy, Brigid's singing reached out to the next generation of the family too. For example, her granddaughter, also Brigid Tunney, credits her granny as having a most profound influence on her style and repertoire. This can clearly be heard in her 2007 CD Hand In Hand.

Andy Irvine of Sweeney's Men and Planxty once described Brigid Tunney as ‘the best singer I ever heard’.[4] He learned ‘Captain Coulston’ and ‘As I Roved Out’ from her singing. Steeleye Span also sang ‘Captain Coulston’ and on their 1971 album Ten Man Mop recorded another song learned from Brigid ‘The Wee Weaver’. A variety of other singers reference her as an influence including the likes of Jack Crawford and Helen Roche.

Her family were at her bedside when on 13 September 1975 she died in the family home in Garvery. She is buried with her husband Patrick in the graveyard at the back of Mulleek Church, near Castlecaldwell overlooking Lough Erne.

== Discography ==
- The Mountain Streams Folktrax FTX-163.
- Where the Linnets Sing: Three generations of the Tunney family and their songs (1992) Comhaltas Ceoltóirí Éireann CL44.

Song Carrier

She learned and sang many songs from her own area and many have been recorded by other artists. Some of the most notable songs that she carried included:

- "As I Roved Out"
- "The Mountain Streams Where the Moorcocks Crow"
- "Easter Snow"
- "Moorlough Mary"
- "Craigie Hill"
- "Lough Erne Shore"
- "The Green Fields of Canada"
- "Captain Coulston"
- "Sheila Nee Iyer"
- "The Pride of Glencoe"
- "The Wee Weaver"
- "My Charming Buachaill Rua"
