= Etta Baker =

American Piedmont blues musician (1913–2006)

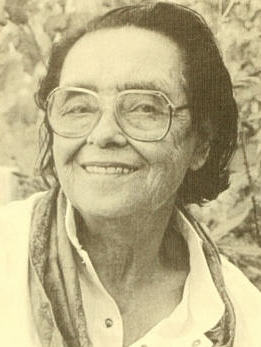
- Baker in 2003

Background information
- Born: Etta Lucille Reid; March 31, 1913; Caldwell County, North Carolina, U.S.
- Origin: Morganton, North Carolina, U.S.
- Died: September 23, 2006 (aged 93) Fairfax, Virginia, U.S.
- Genres: Piedmont blues; country blues
- Instruments: Guitar; banjo; vocals
- Labels: Rounder; Tradition; Reprise; Music Maker

Etta Baker (March 31, 1913 – September 23, 2006) was an American Piedmont blues guitarist and singer from North Carolina.

== Early life and career ==
She was born Etta Lucille Reid in Caldwell County, North Carolina, of African-American, Native American, and European-American heritage. Baker began playing guitar at the age of three. She was taught by her father, Boone Reid, a longtime player of the Piedmont blues on several instruments. He was her only musical instructor. She played both the 6-string and the 12-string acoustic guitar and the five-string banjo. Baker played the Piedmont blues for nearly ninety years.

The family moved to Keysville, Virginia, in 1916. There were eight Reid children, four girls and four boys. All but one survived into adulthood. Each of her siblings played instruments. Occasionally, Baker, her father, and her sister, Cora, would play together at dances on Saturday night. Boone Reid worked a series of jobs during the 1910s and 1920s, occasionally taking work in factories and shipyards in other states. The rest of the family lived with an uncle. By the time Etta Reid was 14 years old, the entire family worked on a tobacco farm in southern Virginia, which meant that they were together. She dropped out of school after tenth grade.

Baker was first recorded in the summer of 1956, after she and her father happened across the folksinger Paul Clayton while visiting the Cone mansion, in Blowing Rock, North Carolina, near their home in Morganton. Baker's father asked Clayton to listen to his daughter playing her signature "One Dime Blues". Clayton was impressed and arrived at the Baker house with his tape recorder the next day, recording several songs. Clayton recorded five solo guitar pieces by Baker, which were released as part of the 1956 album Instrumental Music of the Southern Appalachians, one of the first commercially released recordings of African American banjo music. Baker was not monetarily compensated for these early recordings. Only after working with the Music Maker label later in life was she able to get rights back for this music.

Baker said that she got inspiration for chords through her dreams, stating that it is "like putting a crossword puzzle together". Baker influenced many well-known musical artists, including Bob Dylan, Taj Mahal, and Kenny Wayne Shepherd.

Etta married Lee Baker, a piano player, in 1936 after courting for six years. They had nine children, one of whom was killed in the Vietnam War in 1967, the same year her husband died. For a while after these deaths, she stopped playing, but found she missed the consolation the blues brought her. She last lived in Morganton, North Carolina, and died at the age of 93 in Fairfax, Virginia, while visiting a daughter who had suffered a stroke.

== Awards and honors ==
Baker received the North Carolina Folk Heritage Award from the North Carolina Arts Council in 1989, a National Heritage Fellowship from the National Endowment for the Arts in 1991, and the North Carolina Award in 2003. She was nominated for several Blues Music Awards (formerly the W. C. Handy Blues Awards): in the Traditional Blues Female Artist category in 1987 and 1989, and her album Railroad Bill in the Acoustic Album category in 2000. Along with her sister, Cora Phillips, she received the Brown-Hudson Folklore Award from the North Carolina Folklore Society in 1982.

== Discography ==
- 1956 : Instrumental Music of the Southern Appalachians (Tradition Records; reissued 1997)
- 1991 : One-Dime Blues (Rounder)
- 1998 : The North Carolina Banjo Collection, various artists (Rounder)
- 1999 : Railroad Bill (Music Maker)
- 2004 : Etta Baker with Taj Mahal (Music Maker 50)
- 2005 : Carolina Breakdown, with Cora Phillips (Music Maker 56)
- 2006 : Knoxville Rag, with Kenny Wayne Shepherd, issued on CD as 10 Days Out: Blues from the Backroads, with a DVD showing Shepherd and Baker playing guitar in her kitchen (Reprise Records)
- 2009: "Banjo" (Music Maker)
- 2015: "Railroad Bill" Vinyl Reissue (Music Maker)
