= Avsenik =

Avsenik is a Slovene surname. Notable people with the surname include:

- Slavko Avsenik (1929–2015), Slovenian composer and musician
- Slavko Avsenik Jr. (born 1958), Slovenian composer and pianist, son of Slavko
