= Peter Keane (musician) =

American blues/folk musician (born 1963)

Peter Keane is an American blues/folk musician who was born in Cincinnati, Ohio, in 1963.

== Biography ==
He lives in Austin, Texas, and works as a computer programmer at the company Etsy. Bill Morrissey produced his second album, Walkin' Around. His albums contain original compositions as well as cover versions of songs written by Bob Dylan, Mississippi John Hurt, Bob Wills and Tim Hardin. In 2005, his web page said that he was "semi-retired" as a musician and that most of his recordings had been made available under a Creative Commons license.

== Discography ==
- The Goodnight Blues (1992)
- Walkin' Around (1996)
- Another Kind of Blue (2000)
- Milton Street (2002)
- Rural Electrification (2015)
