= Paddy Tunney =

Irish traditional singer and folklorist (1921–2002)

- Born: 28 January 1921; Glasgow, Scotland
- Died: 7 December 2002 (aged 81); County Donegal, Ireland
- Children: 6
- Mother: Brigid Tunney (née Gallagher)

Paddy Tunney (28 January 1921 – 7 December 2002) was an Irish traditional singer, poet, writer, raconteur, lilter and songwriter. He was affectionately known as the Man of Songs.

== From Glasgow to Garvery ==
Tunney was born in Glasgow to Irish parents, Patrick Tunney from Mollybreen, County Fermanagh, and Brigid Tunney (née Gallagher) from Rusheen near Pettigo, County Donegal. His mother came from a strong musical background going back several generations in her parents' families and had a huge stock of traditional songs. Within a few weeks of his birth the family returned to Ireland to his maternal grandfather's cottage in Rusheen. His maternal grandfather, Michael Gallagher, was his first song teacher and Paddy recalled learning his first song, "The Lark in the Morning", from him at the age of four. The following year the family moved a few miles across the border and settled in the townland of Garvery, in the parish of Mulleek, County Fermanagh. Throughout his childhood and teenage years he learned traditional songs from his mother, who for the rest of his life remained the biggest influence on his style and repertoire [1]. Brigid Tunney's brother, Michael Gallagher, was another important influence on him, particularly when it came to "humorous songs".

== Education and early life ==
He attended Derryhollow NS and later Ballyshannon Technical School. His first job was as a forester and subsequently he worked as a County Council road worker. During the Second World War he became involved with the IRA and in the summer of 1943 was sentenced to seven years penal servitude for smuggling explosives. The regime in the Crumlin Road Gaol at the time was particularly brutal and the four years that he spent there were made a big impression on him. Fellow IRA prisoners at the time included Hugh McAteer, Jimmy Steele, Joe Cahill, Gerry Adams Sr., Frank Morris and Arthur Kearney. On his release he went to Dublin and studied in University College Dublin to become a health inspector. He worked for a time with Dublin Corporation and Kerry County Council before settling in Donegal in 1950. He married Julia Bradley from Manorcunningham in 1955. They had six children together: Paddy, Cathal, Brigid, Michael, Maura and John, all of whom are singers in the family tradition.

== Life and influence in music ==
He attended his first Fleadh Cheoil na h-Éireann in Monaghan in 1952 and from then on rarely missed this annual musical gathering run by Comhaltas Ceoltóirí Éireann. In the early 1960s he began adjudicating at the Fleadh and attended many seminars and workshops associated with traditional music. He served for nearly 20 years at the annual Scoil Éigse, where he passed on his songs and his singing techniques to young singers.[2] For over a decade, beginning in the 1960s, he was a regular on the English Folk club circuit, where he sang alongside Joe Heaney and Louisa Killen, and became friends with the likes of Bert Lloyd, Ewan MacColl, Peggy Seeger, Bill Leader and Hamish Henderson. In the mid-1970s he transferred to Salthill, County Galway for seven years. During that time in the west of Ireland he had the space to give himself over to writing. Not only did he write poetry and compose many songs, he also wrote his acclaimed The Stone Fiddle, which was first published in 1979. He returned to live in Donegal in 1982.

He began broadcasting as far back as 1952, first for Radio Éireann and later for BBC, working with Seán Mac Réamoinn, Seán O'Boyle and Peter Kennedy. Throughout the 1960s he wrote and presented many programmes on RTÉ radio. In the 1980s he collaborated with Ciarán Mac Mathúna of RTÉ on a four-part radio documentary on Irish Traditional Singing. He worked with the BBC producer Tony McCauley scripting and presenting two award-winning television documentaries on the traditions of the area around his home in west Fermanagh. In the new century was the subject of a TG4 series Sé Mo Laoch. His family songs appeared in the repertoires of countless traditional singers, including such commercial artists as The Chieftains, Planxty, Steeleye Span, Paul Brady, Dolores Keane, Andy Irvine, Dick Gaughan, Altan, The Voice Squad, Dervish, Cara Dillon and others.

== Death ==
Tunney died on 7 December 2002 at the age of 81. He was buried at Conwall Cemetery in Letterkenny.

== Discography ==
- The Lark in the Morning (1956) Tradition Records TLP 1004, which also featured Liam Clancy, Tommy Makem and many others.
- The Man of Songs (1962) Folk Legacy FSE 1[3]
- Paddy Tunney (1962) Folk Legacy FSE 7[4]
- A Wild Bee's Nest (1965) Topic 12T139
- The Irish Edge (1966) Topic 12T153
- Ireland her Own (1967) With Arthur Kearney. Also featuring Joe Tunney and Frank Kelly.
- The Mountain Streams Where the Moorcocks Crow (1975) Topic 12TS264
- The Flowery Vale (1976) Topic 12TS289
- Lough Erne Shore (1982) Mulligan LUNA 334[5]
- The Stone Fiddle (1981) Green Linnet SIF 1037[6]
- Where the Linnets Sing: Three generations of the Tunney family and their songs (1992) Comhaltas Ceoltóirí Éireann CL44

In 2009 The Waterford Boys from A Wild Bee's Nest was included in Topic Records 70 year anniversary boxed set Three Score and Ten as track two of the third CD.

== Writing ==
Paddy Tunney wrote two books on Irish traditional songs and singers. They are not autobiographies as such, though they are made up largely of personal recollections and memories of people met and songs sung. They are The Stone Fiddle: My Way to Traditional Song, published by Gilbert Dalton, Skerries, Co. Dublin, in 1979, and Where Songs do Thunder: Travels in Traditional Song which was published in 1991 by Appletree Press, Belfast ISBN 0862812925. Paddy had been writing poetry since childhood and a collection of his work appeared as Dúchas and other poems. Letterkenny: Eagrain Dhun na nGall ISBN 0950840718. In 1990 a collection of his children's stories Ulster Folk Stories for Children was published by Mercier Press, Cork ISBN 0853429308.

== Sources ==
- Duffey, Connie (Autumn 2005). "Paddy Tunney: A Man for All Seasons". Treoir. Comhaltas Ceoltóirí Éireann. Retrieved 10 October 2011
- a b Fear an tí (17 July 2009). "Paddy Tunney". Musicians. Ramblinghouse. Retrieved 10 October 2011.
- Pohle, Horst (1987) The Folk Record Source Book. Berlin: Horst Pohle; p. 473
- All labels & numbers from Pohle, Horst (1987) The Folk Record Source Book. Berlin: Horst Pohle; p. 473
