= Paul Clayton (singer) =

American musician (1931–1967)

Paul Clayton (Worthington)
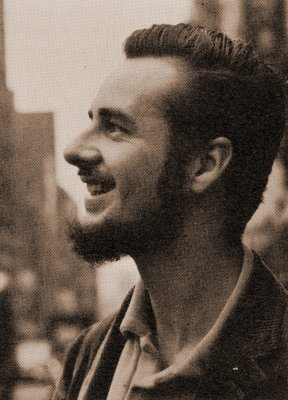

Background information
- Also known as: Pablo Clayton
- Born: Paul Clayton Worthington; March 3, 1931; New Bedford, Massachusetts U.S.
- Died: March 30, 1967 (aged 36) New York City, U.S.
- Genres: Traditional folksongs
- Occupations: Singer-songwriter, folksong collector, field recorder
- Instruments: Vocals, guitar, dulcimer
- Years active: 1950–1967
- Labels: Folkways, Riverside, Tradition, Monument, Elektra
- Formerly of: Dixie Mountain Boys, Dave Van Ronk, Jean Ritchie, Liam Clancy, Bob Dylan

Paul Clayton (born Paul Clayton Worthington; March 3, 1931 – March 30, 1967) was an American folksinger and folklorist who was prominent in the folk music revival of the 1950s and 1960s.

Clayton earned a master's degree in folklore at the University of Virginia in 1957, where he specialized in traditional music, primarily New England sea shanties and ballads as well as Appalachian songs. He became interested in the first of these as a youngster and began playing guitar as a teen. While attending college, he expanded his interests to include the music of Virginia and the surrounding states. Within a short time after leaving college, he began recording. His first releases were for a small specialty record company, but in 1956 he joined Folkways Records, the day's leading folk music label. He recorded six solo albums for Folkways from 1956 to 1958, issued albums for a few specialty labels, moved to another prominent folk label, Elektra Records, for two albums in 1958–59, and collaborated with artists such as Jean Ritchie and Dave Van Ronk on other releases. He made his last recording in 1965.

As much a scholar as a musician, Clayton began collecting songs at a young age in his hometown of New Bedford, Massachusetts. At the university, he studied under a professor who was a leading folklorist. Soon he was combing the hills and valleys of Virginia and surrounding states for songs that formed the region's musical heritage. In making field recordings, he "discovered" Etta Baker and Hobart Smith, homespun musicians who have come to be regarded as all-time greats.

Clayton became a prominent figure in the Greenwich Village folk scene in New York City during the early 1960s. He was close with artists such as Dave Van Ronk and Liam Clancy and was also a mentor and friend of Bob Dylan during the first years of Dylan's career. A song Clayton wrote was allegedly "borrowed" by Dylan in 1962 as the basis for one of his most famous tunes, "Don't Think Twice, It's All Right". The resulting lawsuits by their record companies were settled out of court, and the two remained friends for several years afterwards.

Clayton was beset with personal problems in his mid-30s, including frustrations with his career, doubts arising from his homosexuality, manic depression, drug abuse, and a related arrest. He died by suicide in 1967.

== Early years ==
Clayton was born Paul Clayton Worthington in New Bedford, Massachusetts, in 1931, during the early years of the Great Depression. His parents, Clayton Worthington and Adah (Hardy), were married four years before, and Paul was to be their only child. Despite the hard economic times, his father was comfortably employed as a salesman with a national company, where he eventually would become an executive. The Worthingtons lived with Adah's parents in the West End of New Bedford, a prosperous New England seaport. Paul's parents, however, were both highly charged, Adah especially, and they fought whenever her husband returned home after days on the road. Less than four years following Paul's birth, they divorced.

Clayton and his mother continued to live with her parents, Charles and Elizabeth Hardy, and his introduction to music came early. His parents both played musical instruments, though casually, his father the banjo and his mother the piano. His grandparents would be an even greater influence. Charles Hardy sang songs he had picked up from seafarers and landlubbers alike, while Elizabeth contributed songs she grew up with in Canada's Prince Edward Island. By his teen years, in the mid-1940s, Paul had learned to play guitar, performing traditional songs he learned from his grandparents as well as from folk music programs on the radio. He also hunted down standards from collections available at school and in his explorations, chanced upon a trove of original manuscripts of seafaring songs on a visit one day to the New Bedford Whaling Museum.

Intrigued by the possibilities of using radio to bring traditional music to larger audiences, Clayton landed a weekly series of 15-minute folk programs on New Bedford's WFMR and later on WBSM. Besides writing and announcing his own material, he performed live, singing the traditional songs he had been collecting to his own guitar accompaniment. He was successful enough that the program was expanded to an hour per week. He was still only in high school.

== Folklorist ==
After graduating in 1949, Clayton attended the University of Virginia, where he hoped to gain a better grounding in musical scholarship. One of his professors was Arthur Kyle Davis, Jr., an eminent folklorist. Davis took three students under his wing, including Clayton, encouraging them to transcribe songs, write commentary, and tape the university's collection of deteriorating aluminum recordings. In 1950, Clayton's unusual musical background caught the attention of Helen Hartness Flanders, the wife of U.S. Senator Ralph E. Flanders of Vermont and an internationally recognized folk music authority. Flanders showed up at Clayton's house one day with a tape recorder while the latter was home from college, and she recorded 11 of his songs. The roles had reversed. Now Clayton was the one being collected.

"Clayton arrived at the University of Virginia in 1949 and studied with Arthur Kyle Davis Jr., a scholar of folksongs and author of 1929's Traditional Ballads of Virginia. Later, as a graduate student, Clayton helped produce More Traditional Ballads of Virginia, writing deeply researched headnotes and transcribing tapes buried in the archives of the Virginia Folklore Society."

That same year he discovered a new instrument, the Appalachian dulcimer. Seeking out traditional players in North Carolina, Kentucky, and Virginia, he learned a variety of styles, becoming more proficient on dulcimer than he was on guitar. Through the knowledge he had gathered on the instrument, he collaborated on a booklet, The Appalachian Dulcimer, writing authoritatively on the subject. Meanwhile, he scoured the countryside for traditional players and songs. To help finance his field trips, he performed at colleges, schools, bars, and coffeehouses along the way. Around this time, Paul began using his father's name as his stage name.

Clayton continued to assist in editing Davis's book More Traditional Ballads of Virginia (published 1960). He reported his research in a quarterly journal, Southern Folklore, and for a time planned a book of his own, also on traditional Virginian songs, though the work never materialized.

== Recordings ==
In 1952, Clayton recorded a tape of bluegrass material with a friend, musician Bill Clifton, and sent it off to Stinson Records in New York with the hopes of interesting the label in issuing an album. Stinson declined, but considered four tracks for singles. However, the sides went unissued. After college, Stinson put out Clayton's first album, Whaling Songs & Ballads, which was released in cooperation with the New Bedford Whaling Museum. Another Stinson release, Waters of Tyne, followed, and over the next few years he recorded for a series of other folk music labels, releasing Whaling and Sailing Songs on Tradition Records and Wanted for Murder: Songs of Outlaws and Desperados and Bloody Ballads: British and American Murder Ballads on Riverside Records, among others.

Through his efforts at promotion, Clayton developed many useful connections, one of which brought him to the attention of a small but significant record company, Folkways Records. Folkways, led by Moe Asch, later recognized as the father of World Music, specialized in traditional material of a wide range, from Inuit and Patagonian songs to ballads sung by Serbo-Croats and Bulgarians. The venue was suited for the traditional music Clayton specialized in.

Refocusing his attentions on the basics, he issued a series of albums for Folkways that brought together his grandfather's ballads and shanties with the rarities uncovered through his scholarly pursuits in Virginia. Four Clayton albums were released by Folkways in 1956 alone: his first, Bay State Ballads, followed by Folk Songs and Ballads of Virginia, Cumberland Mountain Folksongs, and The Folkways-Viking Record of Folk Ballads of the English Speaking World. The next year, Folkways put out two more Clayton releases, American Broadside Ballads in Popular Tradition and Dulcimer Songs and Solos. In a span of just three years, he had recorded twelve albums.

In 1958, Clayton switched labels again, moving over to Elektra, an eclectic label that also specialized in folk music. He recorded Unholy Matrimony that year with Bob Yellin backing him on banjo and the next year released Bobby Burns' Merry Muses of Caledonia. His work was also featured in 1959 on the Folkways album Foc'sle Songs and Shanties with the Foc'sle Singers, whose members included Dave Van Ronk, Roger Abrahams, and Bob Brill. His stay at Elektra was short, and following his second release with the label, he joined Monument Records, a smaller outfit, where he issued an EP, a series of singles and his final album, Paul Clayton, Folk Singer!, in 1965.

Clayton recorded the first nationally charted version of Woody Guthrie's "This Land Is Your Land". The record (Monument 416) entered the Music Vendor pop chart 4/5/60, reaching No. 79 in a 4-week chart stay.

Other significant recordings by Clayton included a collaboration with Diane Hamilton and Liam Clancy entitled Instrumental Music of the Southern Appalachians, which featured field recordings of Etta Baker, Hobart Smith, and other indigenous artists. In 1956, he joined with Jean Ritchie and Richard Chase on American Folk Tales & Songs. He also recorded for the Library of Congress, and tapes he made of Rev. Gary Davis and Pink Anderson were used for the album American Street Songs on Riverside Records.

== Alleged plagiarism by Bob Dylan ==
Bob Dylan's friendship with Clayton dates back to 1961, Dylan's first year in New York City. As a means to mend fences, Dylan traveled cross-country with Clayton and two other friends in 1964, during which they visited poet Carl Sandburg in North Carolina, attended Mardi Gras in New Orleans and rendezvoused with Joan Baez in California.

In an interview published as part of a history of Greenwich Village folk club Gerde's Folk City, folk singer Barry Kornfeld described how Clayton's "Who's Gonna Buy You Ribbons (When I'm Gone)" morphed into Dylan's Don't Think Twice, It's All Right:

I was with Paul one day, and Dylan wanders by and says, 'Hey, man, that's a great song. I'm going to use that song.' And he wrote a far better song, a much more interesting song – 'Don't Think Twice, It's All Right'.

Dylan's and Clayton's publishing companies sued each other over the alleged plagiarism. As it turned out, Clayton's song was derived from an earlier folk song entitled "Who's Gonna Buy You Chickens When I'm Gone?", which was in the public domain. The lawsuits, which were settled out of court, had little effect on the friendship between the two songwriters.

In the notes to Biograph (1985), Dylan acknowledges that "'Don't Think Twice' was a riff that Paul [Clayton] had." He also credits Clayton for the melody line to "Percy's Song".

In 1970, Dylan recorded "Gotta Travel On", a song copyrighted by Clayton, as the 14th track of his album Self Portrait.

== Personal life ==
Clayton's sexual identity emerged during college. The university had an almost entirely male student body, and a gay subculture had existed there for many years. Due to the university's conservative values, it all remained closeted. Throughout his life Clayton remained closeted, only having a private romantic life.

In February 1966, Paul and two friends were arrested in a federal drug raid on three houses in the university neighborhood in Charlottesville, Virginia. As he was arrested he is quoted as saying, "I'm much more concerned with Gingerbread (a song he was writing at the time) than marijuana." Although the raid produced an ounce of marijuana, the charges were dropped on March 14, 1967, against the 36-year-old folklorist on the grounds of illegally obtained search warrants.

== Death ==
Just a few days after his drug charge was dropped, on March 30, 1967, Clayton died by suicide at his apartment in New York, using an electric heater into his bathtub. He is buried at Oak Grove Cemetery, New Bedford, Massachusetts.

== Discography ==
=== Albums ===
- 1954? Whaling Songs & Ballads, Stinson Records
- 1956? Waters of Tyne: English North Country Songs & Ballads, Stinson Records
- 1956 Bay State Ballads, Folkways Records
- 1956 Folk Songs and Ballads of Virginia, Folkways Records
- 1956 Cumberland Mountain Folksongs, Folkways Records
- 1956 Viking Record of Folk Ballads of the English Speaking World, Folkways Records
- 1956 Whaling and Sailing Songs from the Days of Moby Dick, Tradition Records
- 1956 Bloody Ballads: British and American Murder Ballads, Riverside Records
- 195? Wanted for Murder: Songs of Outlaws and Desperados, Riverside Records
- 1957 American Broadside Ballads in Popular Tradition, Folkways Records
- 1957 Dulcimer Songs and Solos, Folkways Records
- 1957 American Songs of Revolutionary Times, Olympic Records
- 1958 Timber-r-r! Lumberjack Folk Songs & Ballads, Riverside Records
- 195? Concert of British and American Folksongs, Riverside Records
- 1958 Unholy Matrimony, Elektra Records
- 1958 Bobby Burns' Merry Muses of Caledonia, Elektra Records
- 1959 Foc'sle Songs and Shanties (with The Foc'sle Singers), Folkways Records
- 1961 Home-Made Songs & Ballads, Monument Records
- 1965 Paul Clayton: Folk Singer!, Monument Records
- 1975 Bill Clifton & Paul Clayton: The First Recordings, A Bluegrass Session, 1952, Bear Family Records
- 2008 Folk Singer & Sings Home Made Songs & Ballads, Monument albums and singles, Bear Family Records

=== EP ===
- 1961 Home-Made Songs and Ballads, Monument Records

=== Singles ===
- 1959 "Who's Gonna Buy You Ribbons (When I'm Gone)" (Clayton), Monument Records

"This Land Is Your Land" (Guthrie)

- 1960 "Pharaoh's Army (Got Drownded) (Clayton), Monument Records

"Pretty Peggy-O" (Clayton)

- 1960 "Last Cigarette" (Clayton), Monument Records

"So Long (It's Been Good to Know You)" (Clayton)

- 1960 "So Long (It's Been Good to Know You)" (Clayton), London Records

"Wings of a Dove" (Ferguson)

- 1962 "Wings of a Dove" (Ferguson), Monument Records

"The Convent at Ronda" (Clayton)

- 1964 "Yellow Bird" (Monton, Durand), Monument Records

"Kilgary Mountain" (Gibson, Camp, Warner)

- 1965 "San Francisco Bay Blues" (Fuller), Monument Records

"Green Rocky Road" (L. Chandler, Kaufman, arr. Van Ronk)
