= The Lark in the Morning (album) =

Studio album by Liam Clancy and Tommy Makem
- Released: 1956
- Length: 48:40
- Label: Tradition

The Lark in the Morning is an album by Liam Clancy and Tommy Makem.

It has the distinction of being the second album-length recording of Irish music to be recorded in Ireland, after the Ireland volume of the Columbia World Library of Folk and Primitive Music. It was recorded by Diane Hamilton and Catherine Wright on portable equipment, between August and December 1955. It was issued on Tradition Records in 1956 as TLP 1004. At the time Liam Clancy, the youngest member of the Clancy Brothers, had not yet joined with his brothers to form the group that would be known as The Clancy Brothers and Tommy Makem, which incorporated itself in 1960. He traveled back to the USA with Diane Hamilton in 1956. Tracks 5, 9, 13, 17 and 21 are sung in Irish, itself a rarity at the time. Tracks 3, 8, 16 and 20 are instrumentals. Paddy Tunney's version of "The Lowlands of Holland" is the one that was later used by Steeleye Span. Most of the artists went on to be recorded by later collectors. Running time: 48 mins 40secs. The liner notes for the 1996 Rykodisc reissue are by Liam Clancy.

== Track listing ==
=== Side one ===
1. "The Lark in the Morning" (Paddy Tunney) (Trad)
2. "The Cobbler" (Tommy Makem) (Trad)
3. "Unidentified jig" (Padraig O'Keefe) (Trad)
4. "Rockin' the Cradle" (Paddy Tunney) (Trad)
5. "Sean Dun Na Ngall" (Joan Butler & Peg Power) (Trad)
6. "Whisky You're The Devil" (Liam Clancy) (Trad)
7. "Dowdling" (lilting) (Joan Clancy) (Trad)
8. "Unidentified hornpipe" (Dennis Murphy) (Trad)
9. "Roisin Dubh" (Paddy Tunney) (Trad)
10. "The Whistling Thief" (Sean Mac Donnchadha) (Trad)
11. "In the Month of January" (Sarah Makem) (Trad)

=== Side two ===
1. "The Little Beggerman" (Sarah Makem & Tommy Makem) (Trad)
2. "Druimin Donn Dilis" (Peg Power) (Trad)
3. "The Wran Song" (The Wren Song) (Liam Clancy) (Trad)
4. "The Lowlands of Holland" (Paddy Tunney) (Trad)
5. "Unidentified Reel" (Peter Bates) (Trad)
6. "An Bhruinnlin Bheasach" (Sean Mac Donnchadha) (Trad)
7. "Maggie Pickens" (lilting) (Paddy Tunney) (Trad)
8. "My Bonnie Boy" (Young, But A-Growing) (Sean Mac Donnchadha) (Trad)
9. "Hornpipe" (My Love She's But A Lassie Yet) (Dennis Murphy) (Trad)
10. "Amhran Dochais" (Liam Clancy) (Trad)
11. "Barbara Allen" (Thomas Baynes) (Trad)

== Credits ==
Liam Clancy (vocals), Tommy Makem (vocals), Paddy Tunney (vocals), Padraig O'Keefe (fiddle), Joan Butler (vocals), Peg Power (vocals), Joan Clancy (vocals), Dennis Murphy (fiddle, accordion), Sean Mac Donnchadha (vocals), Sarah Makem (vocals), Peter Bates (fiddle), Thomas Baynes (vocals). Note: On this album "Padraig O'Keefe" is spelled with a single "f". However, his name more usually has two "f"s.
