= The Curse of K.K. Hammond =

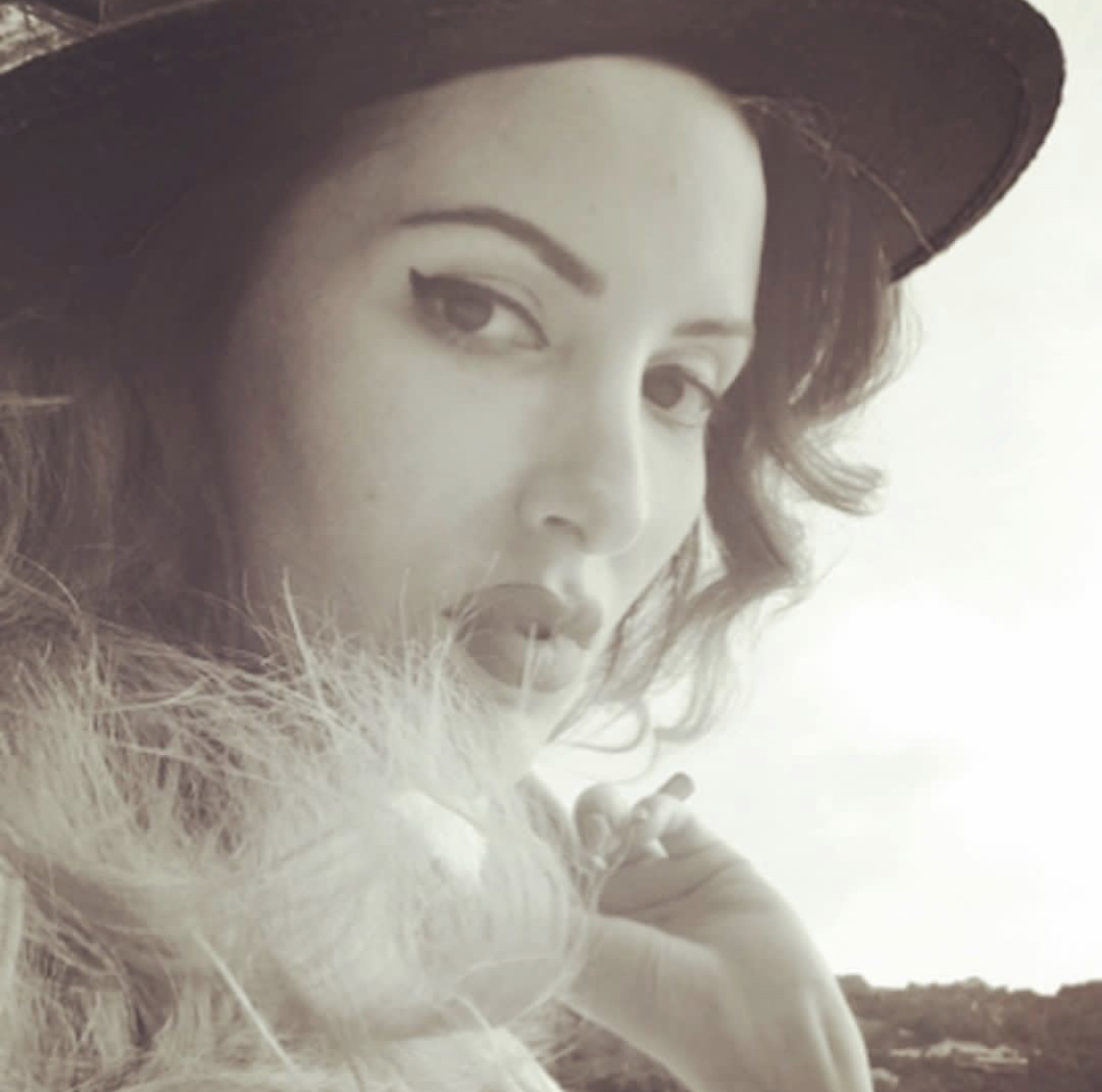

Background information
- Born: London
- Genres: Blues

The Curse of K.K. Hammond is a British singer-songwriter and slide guitarist.

== Biography ==
K.K. Hammond was born and raised in London, England. She began her career as a musician with her slide guitar performances on social media. Her music has been featured on blues radio shows, including the Cerys Matthews BBC Radio 2 Blues Show and the Gary Grainger Blues Show on Bishop FM.

Her debut album, Death Roll Blues, was released on March 31, 2023, subsequently reaching number one on the UK iTunes Blues chart. It subsequently reached number one spot in the US iTunes Blues chart, and made it into the number 12 spot in the mainstream iTunes charts (across all genres) and a number 18 spot in the UK iTunes mainstream chart. It was also the number three best seller of all time for an iTunes Blues pre-sale. Death Roll Blues debuted at number seven on the Billhoard magazine Blues Album chart.
