= Celisse Henderson =

Celisse
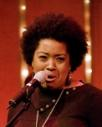

Background information
- Born: Celisse Allegra Henderson; Oakland, California
- Occupations: Singer; Songwriter; Instrumentalist; Actress
- Instruments: Guitar; Keyboard
- Years active: 2000s–present

Celisse Allegra Henderson is an American singer, songwriter, instrumentalist, and actress. She first gained recognition through musical theatre, making her Broadway debut in 2011, before establishing a music and acting career.

== Early and personal life ==
Celisse Allegra Henderson was born in Oakland, California, and spent her childhood across several cities in the San Francisco Bay Area including Suisun City, Antioch, and San Francisco. Her father taught voice and gospel music at the University of California, Berkeley before becoming chair of the music department at Los Medanos College in Pittsburg, California. Her mother directed a high school choir, jazz band, and orchestra.

Henderson was raised in a conservative Christian household, and had exposure to only gospel and classical music, and the recordings of Ella Fitzgerald and Barbra Streisand during her childhood. She has named Fitzgerald, Streisand, Whitney Houston, Crystal Lewis, Joni Mitchell, and Sister Rosetta Tharpe amongst her musical influences. She has spoken publicly about the importance of diversity and representation within the music industry and in the National Association of Music Merchants. Henderson identifies as queer.

== Career ==
Henderson began her professional career in musical theatre. At the age of 18, she appeared in the long-running revue Beach Blanket Babylon in San Francisco. She later appeared in the Off-Broadway musical In Transit, performed in Jerry Springer: The Opera at Carnegie Hall, and in Leonard Bernstein's Mass with the Baltimore Symphony Orchestra. She was part of the first national tour of Wicked. In 2011, she made her Broadway debut in the revival of Godspell.

Alongside her stage career, Henderson appeared in several television productions including The Electric Company, 30 Rock, Rescue Me, White Collar, The Big C, and Are We There Yet?. She has also appeared on the Late Show with Stephen Colbert, and played guitar with Lizzo on Saturday Night Live. Apart from her acting and television career, she was a singer, songwriter, and multi-instrumentalist. She performed at several venues including the Beacon Theatre, Madison Square Garden, and the Apollo Theater, and has collaborated with several artists including Patti Austin, Melissa Etheridge, Trey Anastasio, Mariah Carey, Joni Mitchell, Brandi Carlile, Dave Matthews Band, John Legend, John Mayer, and Jon Batiste.

In 2023, Henderson collaborated with Catapult Opera to create an opera and short film titled When All I Knew Changed based on her experiences during the COVID-19 pandemic.
