= Ed McCurdy =

American singer-songwriter

- Born: Edward Potts McCurdy; January 11, 1919; Willow Hill, Pennsylvania, US
- Died: March 23, 2000 (aged 81) Halifax, Nova Scotia, Canada
- Genre: Folk
- Occupations: Singer, songwriter, character actor
- Instrument: Guitar
- Years active: 1938–1994

Ed McCurdy (born Edward Potts McCurdy; January 11, 1919 – March 23, 2000) was an American and Canadian singer of both contemporary and English folk music, a songwriter, and character actor. He was perhaps best known for his anti-war song "Last Night I Had the Strangest Dream", written in 1950 and since performed by dozens of artists across multiple genres. Born in the United States, McCurdy became a naturalized Canadian citizen in 1986.

== Music career ==
McCurdy first found success in 1937 in Oklahoma City, Oklahoma, as a gospel singer on WKY radio. The following year he became one of the station's disc jockeys. Restless, the baritone next traveled between clubs and radio programs covering tunes from The Great American Songbook. Soon after, burlesque dancer Sally Rand hired him to don a tuxedo and croon while pushing her on a swing. Rand and McCurdy, performed together globally for several years, along with comedian Jack E. Leonard, for whom McCurdy played the straight man.

In 1945, McCurdy moved to Vancouver, Canada, where he hosted his own show for CBC Radio. "Ed McCurdy Sings" (1947–1948) was the first of the broadcaster's English language programs dedicated to the folk genre. During this period he developed friendships with show guests such as Pete Seeger, Josh White, and Oscar Brand. McCurdy recorded his first folk album in 1949. From then until 1954 McCurdy starred in two other CBC Radio shows—one in Toronto and another in Vancouver.

While still living in Canada, McCurdy traveled to club and coffeehouse gigs in New York City, where the folk music revival was booming. He headlined several shows at the Village Vanguard in 1950. In 1954, McCurdy moved his family to Greenwich Village. The labels under which he recorded include Riverside, Tradition, and Elektra Records. He played the Newport Folk Festival in 1959, 1960, and 1963. He performed at the Mariposa Folk Festival in 1962 and, after moving to Nova Scotia in 1982, he played Mariposa, Home County and Winnipeg Folk Festivals until 1994.

In addition to folk songs, Elektra recorded McCurdy's collection of lewd Elizabethan songs in a series of albums titled When Dalliance was in Flower (and Maidens Lost Their Heads). These became favorites among college students of the era.

=== Last Night I Had the Strangest Dream ===
McCurdy's anti-war song, "Last Night I Had the Strangest Dream", has been recorded by dozens of artists in seventy-seven languages. Early covers were by American folk artists Pete Seeger, The Weavers, Chad Mitchell, The Kingston Trio, Simon & Garfunkel, and Canadian folk group The Travellers. Other covers have been performed by rock star Bruce Springsteen, country singer Garth Brooks, jazz musician Charles Lloyd, and pianist and showman Liberace.

In 1980, recordings by Josh White Jr. of "Last Night I Had the Strangest Dream" and another McCurdy composition, "King's Highway", became the official theme songs for the Peace Corps and VISTA, respectively. In 1989, during the fall of the Berlin Wall, NBC-TV recorded children singing the song while the wall came down. In 1992, the song earned McCurdy The Peace Abbey's Courage of Conscience award.

In 2005, "Last Night I Had the Strangest Dream" was inducted into the Canadian Songwriters Hall of Fame.

== TV work ==
McCurdy also performed on television in Canada and the United States. From 1953 to 1954 in Toronto he did the children's show "Ed's Place" and, in a 1954 CBC TV production of Mavor Moore's The Hero of Mariposa, he sang the part Mal Tompkins. In the US he emceed the George Gobel Show and starred in the New York children's TV show Freddie The Fireman.

In the mid-1980s, he and his wife moved to Nova Scotia, where he enjoyed a second career as a character actor on Canadian television.

== Personal life ==
Born January 11, 1919, to a farming family in Willow Hill, Pennsylvania, Edward Potts McCurdy was the youngest of 12 children. He left home at 18 to pursue a singing career. He met his future wife, dancer Beryl English, in 1942 in Vancouver, Canada; they married in 1946.

By the late 1960s, McCurdy's health was in decline and he spent the better part of the 1970s bedridden. In 1986, four years after moving from New York to Nova Scotia, he became a naturalized Canadian citizen.

McCurdy died from heart failure on March 23, 2000, in Halifax, Canada. In addition to his wife, he was survived by three children: daughters Mary and Dana, son, James; and three grandchildren, all of New York.

== Discography ==
- 1949: Sings Canadian Folksongs (Manhattan)
- 1955: Sings Folk Songs of The Canadian Maritimes (Whitehall Records)
- 1955: Badmen, Heroes, and Pirate Songs (Elektra Records)
- 1955: Sin Songs Pro & Con (Elektra EKL 124)
- 1955: The Ballad Record (Riverside Records)
- 1956: The Miracle of the Wheat (single – Kapp Records)
- 1956: Blood Booze 'n Bones (Elektra)
- 1956: Bar Room Ballads (Riverside)
- 195(?): Let's Sing Out (Capri 507) Canada
- 1956: The Folk Singer (Dawn Records)
- 1956: A Ballad Singer's Choice (Tradition Records, Empire Musicwerks)
- 1956: When Dalliance Was in Flower (and Maidens Lost Their Heads) vol. 1 (Elektra)
- 1957: Sin Songs – Pro and Con (Elektra)
- 1957: Songs of the Old West (Elektra)
- 195(?): "Songs I Learned Coming Thru The Great Smokies" (FolkArt FLP 5001)
- 1958: When Dalliance Was in Flower (and Maidens Lost Their Heads) vol. 2 (Elektra)
- 1958: When Dalliance Was in Flower (and Maidens Lost Their Heads) vol. 3 (Elektra)
- 1958: Children's Songs (Tradition Records)
- 1959: Son of Dalliance (Elektra)
- 1959: Children's Songs and Stories (Folkways Records)
- 1961: A Treasure Chest Of American Folk Song Double LP (Elektra)
- 1962: Folk Songs (Coronet)
- 1963: The Best of Dalliance (Elektra)
- 1968: Songs of the West (Tradition/Everest TR 2061)'
- 1976: "Last Night I Had The Strangest Dream" (Bear Family Records) Germany
- 1977: On Jordan's Stormy Banks I Stand: Sacred Songs of America with Dana McCurdy (Folkways Records)
- 1980: Songs and Stories (Folkways Records)
- 1996: Cowboy Songs (Tradition Records)
- 1996: Naughty & Bawdy Songs of Olde England (Warner Bros. Records)
- The Legend of Robin Hood (Riverside)
- American Folk Songs (Spoken Arts)
- A Child's Introduction to American Folk Songs (Spoken Arts)
- Sings Folksongs of the Sea (Tiara Spotlight Series – TST 537)
- 2019: Cowboy & Western Songs (BACM)

== See also ==
- The Canterbury Tales – popular and sometimes bawdy tales from 14th century England
- Ramblin' Jack Elliott – collaborated with McCurdy at Elektra Records
- Wit and Mirth, or Pills to Purge Melancholy – a collection of songs published between 1698 and 1720
