= Tradition Records =

Defunct American folk record label

- Founded: 1955
- Founder: Diane Hamilton
- Defunct: 1966
- Status: acquired by Everest Records
- Genre: folk music
- Country of origin: United States
- Location: New York City

Tradition Records was an American record label from 1955 to 1966 that specialized in folk music. The label was founded and financed by Guggenheim heiress Diane Hamilton (the pseudonym of Diane Guggenheim) in 1956. Its president and director was Patrick "Paddy" Clancy, who was soon to join his brothers Liam and Tom Clancy and Tommy Makem, as part of the new Irish folk group, The Clancy Brothers and Tommy Makem. Liam Clancy designed the company's maple leaf logo. Columbia University Professor of Folklore Kenneth Goldstein was also involved in the early creation of the company, which operated out of Greenwich Village, New York, United States.

With artists like The Clancy Brothers, Odetta, and Jean Ritchie growing in popularity during the American folk music revival, the label began to generate good profits. When The Clancy Brothers signed with Columbia Records in 1961, Paddy Clancy ceased to run the day-to-day operations of the company. In 1966, The Clancy Brothers and Tommy Makem, as owners of the label, sold the Tradition catalogue to Everest Records. Everest reissued Tradition recordings without any notes in haphazard permutations. Much of the Tradition catalogue has been reissued on CD and/or for digital download. For many years John Jacob Niles received little acclaim, but following the broadcast of the Bob Dylan documentary No Direction Home, there was a surge in the demand for his albums. His two albums on Tradition were reissued.

43 North Broadway, a private IP management fund, acquired the exclusive worldwide rights to the Tradition Records catalog, as part of its acquisition of the Everest Records Group of labels.

== Partial discography ==
=== TLP series ===
- TLP 501: Siobhán McKenna, John Neville, Tom Clancy: The Countess Cathleen
- TLP 1001: Isla Cameron: Through Bushes And Briars (Songs From The British Isles) (1956)
- TLP 1002: Hillel and Aviva: Songs Of Israel and Many Lands (1956)
- TLP 1003: Ed McCurdy: A Ballad Singer's Choice (1956)
- TLP 1004: Liam Clancy, Tommy Makem, Sarah Makem, Paddy Tunney, Padraig O'Keeffe: The Lark in the Morning (1956)
- TLP 1005: Paul Clayton: Whaling and Sailing Songs from the Days of Moby Dick (1956)
- TLP 1006: The Clancy Brothers and Tommy Makem: The Rising of the Moon: Irish Songs of Rebellion (1956)
- TLP 1007: Various artists: Instrumental Music of the Southern Appalachians 1976
- TLP 1008: El Nino De Ronda: The Real Flamenco 1969
- TLP 1009: John Langstaff: Sings American and English Folk Songs and Ballads
- TLP 1010: Odetta: Odetta Sings Ballads and Blues 1957
- TLP 1011: Jean Ritchie & Paul Clayton: American Folk Tales and Songs 1956
- TLP 1012: Norman Notley and David Brynley: Elizabethan Songs (1956)
- TLP 1013: Seamus Ennis: The Bonny Bunch of Roses (1956)
- TLP 1014: Oscar Brand: Laughing America (1956)
- TLP 1015: Ewan MacColl and Peggy Seeger: Classic Scots Ballads (1956)
- TLP 1016: A. L. Lloyd: The Foggy Dew and other Traditional English Love Songs (1956)
- TLP 1017: Colyn Davies: Cockney Music Hall Songs & Recitations (1956)
- TLP 1018: Kossoy Sisters: Bowling Green and Other Folk Songs from the Southern Mountains
- TLP 1019: Glenn Yarbrough: Come and Sit by My Side 1957
- TLP 1020: Various artists: Negro Prison Songs 1958
- TLP 1021
- TLP 1022: Oscar Brand: Pie in the Sky 1967
- TLP 1023: John Jacob Niles: I Wonder As I Wander - Carols And Love Songs
- TLP 1024: Mary O'Hara: Songs of Ireland
- TLP 1025: Odetta: Odetta At The Gate Of Horn
- TLP 1026: Ewan MacColl and A. L. Lloyd: Blow Boys Blow 1960
- TLP 1027 Ed McCurdy - Children's Songs (1958)
- TLP 1028 David Hammond - I Am the Wee Falorie Man: Folk Songs of Ireland
- TLP 1029 Alan Lomax - Texas Folksongs (1958)
- TLP 1030 Various Artists - Music and Song of Italy, Recorded byAlan Lomax and Diego Carpitella (1958)
- TLP 1031: Jean Ritchie: Carols of All Seasons
- TLP 1032: The Clancy Brothers and Tommy Makem: Come Fill Your Glass with Us
- TLP 1033: Robin Roberts: Come All Ye Fair and Tender Ladies
- TLP 1034 Diane Hamilton & Robin Roberts - So Early in the Morning: Irish Children's Traditional Songs, Rhymes and Games (1959)
- TLP 1035: Lightnin' Hopkins: Country Blues 1959
- TLP 1036: John Jacob Niles: An Evening with John Jacob Niles 1959
- TLP 1037: Theodore Alevizos: Songs of Greece 1960
- TLP 1040: Lightnin' Hopkins: Autobiography in Blues 1960
- TLP 1042: The Clancy Brothers and Tommy Makem: The Clancy Brothers and Tommy Makem
- TLP 1043: Carolyn Hester: Carolyn Hester 1961
- TLP 1044: Tommy Makem: Songs of Tommy Makem
- TLP 1045 Peg and Bobby Clancy - Songs from Ireland -(1961)
- TLP 1046 John Jacob Niles - The Ballads of John Jacob Niles (1961) (2xLP)
- TLP 1047 Various Artists - Heather and Glen: Songs and Melodies of Highland and Lowland Scotland
- TLP 1048
- TLP 1049
- Note: At this point, Everest Records buys the Tradition label. Main series prefixes change to TR/STR for mono and stereo, respectively:

== See also ==
- List of record labels
