= Kossoy Sisters =

American singing duo

- Born: May 11, 1938; New York City, New York, U.S.
- Origin: Greenwich Village, New York City
- Genres: Folk
- Instrument: Vocal
- Years active: 1956–1960s, 1981, 2002–2003, 2012
- Members: Irene Saletan, Ellen Christenson (born Irene and Ellen Kossoy)
- Website: KossoySisters.com

The Kossoy Sisters are identical twin sisters (Irene Saletan and Ellen Christenson) who performed American folk and old-time music. Irene sang mezzo-soprano vocal, and Ellen supplied soprano harmony, with Irene on guitar and Ellen playing the five-string banjo in a traditional up-picking technique. Their performances were notable examples of close harmony singing. They began performing professionally in their mid-teens and are esteemed as a significant part of the popular folk music movement that started in the mid-1950s.

== Early life and career ==
Irene and Ellen Kossoy were born on May 11, 1938, in New York City, and attended New York City schools throughout their youth. The twins began singing together at about the age of six, in imitation of harmonies created in the home by their mother and aunt. At 15, they attended a summer camp at which Pete Seeger and other well-known folk singers often performed, and they developed a life-long attachment to the genre. They quickly discovered the bustling folk music scene in the Greenwich Village section of New York City and mingled with the people who congregated in Washington Square Park.

In 1956, when they were 17 years old, the Kossoy Sisters recorded the album Bowling Green with sound engineer Mel Kaiser. Released on Tradition Records, the album features close, Appalachian-style harmonies, with instrumental accompaniment by Erik Darling.

That same year, producer Harold Leventhal included them in the Bound for Glory tribute/benefit concert at New York's Pythian Hall for the hospitalized Woody Guthrie and his children. The concert drew more than a thousand, which overflowed into the street. The Kossoys sang three of Guthrie's songs, exhibiting "sweet harmonizing," as Pete Seeger later recounted.

After graduating from high school, the Kossoys left New York to attend Blackburn College in Carlinville, Illinois. While on summer break in 1959, they performed at the first Newport Folk Festival.

== Adult lives and careers ==
Soon after completion of their formal studies, each of the sisters married. Ellen moved to St. Louis where she and her husband, Robin Christenson, had a son and a daughter. Irene settled in the Boston area and would also have a son and a daughter. Irene and then-husband Tony Saletan performed together as Tony and Irene Saletan. In 1964, the couple also joined with Jackie Washington Landrón to perform as the Boston Folk Trio. The Saletans also gigged in the New York City area with Happy Traum, whom Irene had known since she and her sister were teenagers. Together they presented school concerts through the non-profit Young Audiences Arts for Learning.

In 1970, the Saletans released the album Folk Songs and Ballads on Folk-Legacy Records. Irene and Tony also released a seven-inch vinyl recording of four songs for the Boston Mutual Life Insurance Company, titled The Ballad of Boston and Other New England Folk Tunes. Another record, Revolutionary Tea, came out on Old North Bridge Records in 1975 with Irene listed as one of the "Yankee Tunesmiths."

The Kossoy Sisters reunited to play together on occasion, such as at the 1971 Fox Hollow Folk Festival in Petersburgh, New York, a 1981 tour of California, and recurring concerts in New York City, Washington DC, Pinewoods Camp, and various venues in the St. Louis and Boston areas where each sister lived. Each of the sisters later divorced, after which they again became housemates, eventually settling in Guatemala.

== Later career ==
The Kossoy Sisters' music reached new audiences when their 1956 album was reissued on CD through Rykodisc in 1997. One song from it, "I'll Fly Away," was featured in the Coen Brothers' 2000 film O Brother, Where Art Thou? whose soundtrack won the 2002 Grammy Award for Album of the Year. Renewed interest in the Kossoy's music led to the sisters recording a second album, Hop on Pretty Girls, released on CD through the Living Folk label in 2002, 46 years after their previous LP. A noncommercial CD, Kossoy Sisters, appeared the following year through Boston NPR station WBUR, documenting a February 2003 interview with the twins during their promotional tour for Hop on Pretty Girls.

Fifty-three years after debuting at the first Newport Folk Festival, the Kossoy Sisters returned to Newport to perform at the 2012 festival. Shortly after, the Kossoy's 1956 rendition of The Carter Family song "Single Girl, Married Girl" appeared on the soundtrack of the 2014 film Obvious Child.

As of 2022, the Kossoy Sisters were retired and living together in Guatemala.

== Discography ==
- Bowling Green, Tradition 1956 – rereleased by Rykodisc in 1996, released again by Rykodisc as part of the three-disc set The Best of the Bluegrass Tradition (although the music on the Kossoys' recording is not bluegrass)
- Hop on Pretty Girls, Living Folk 2002
- Kossoy Sisters – recording of an interview from the National Public Radio program "On Point", February 23, 2003
- Banjo Music of the Southern Appalachians, Erik Darling, Olympic (date unknown) (The Kossoy Sisters appear on this record.)
- Instrumental Music and Songs of Southern Appalachians, Erik Darling (The last 10 tracks of this CD, uncredited but all sung by the Kossoy Sisters, appear to be copied from Banjo Music of the Southern Appalachians.)
