= List of awards and nominations received by the Smithsonian Folkways =

Smithsonian Folkways awards and nominations
Awards and nominations
Award	Wins	Nominations
Grammy	7	22
Latin Grammy Awards	1	1
Grammy Lifetime Achievement Award	10	

Totals (Note: Certain award groups do not simply award one winner. They acknowledge several different recipients, have runners-up, and have third place. Since this is a specific recognition and is different from losing an award, runner-up mentions are considered wins in this award tally. For simplification and to avoid errors, each award in this list has been presumed to have had a prior nomination.)
- Wins: 18
- Nominations: 23

Below is a list of awards, accolades, and recognitions that Smithsonian Folkways and its collection of labels have won throughout their existence.

== Grammy Awards ==
Year	Category	Title	Artist	Result
1960	Best Album Created for Children	Folk Songs for Young People	Pete Seeger	Nominated
1960	Best Performance—Folk	Songs of Robert Burns	Ewan MacColl	Nominated
1965	Best Folk Recording	The High Lonesome Sound	Roscoe Holcomb	Nominated
1997	Best Traditional Folk Album	There Ain't No Way Out	The New Lost City Ramblers	Nominated
1997	Best Historical Album	Anthology of American Folk Music™	Various Artists	Won
1997	Best Album Notes	Anthology of American Folk Music™	Various Artists	Won
2001	Best Historical Album	The Best of Broadside 1962–1988	Various Artists	Nominated
2001	Best Liner Notes	The Best of Broadside 1962–1988	Various Artists	Nominated
2004	Best Traditional World Music Album	Capoeira Angola 2: Brincando na Roda	Grupo de Capoeira Angola Pelourinho	Nominated
2004	Best Traditional World Music Album	Jíbaro Hasta el Hueso: Mountain Music of Puerto Rico by Ecos de Borinquen	Ecos de Borinquen	Nominated
2005	Best Musical Album for Children	Sharing Cultures with Ella Jenkins	Ella Jenkins	Nominated
2005	Best Traditional World Album	Abayudaya: Music from the Jewish People of Uganda	Various Artists	Nominated
2005	Best Traditional World Album	Si, Soy Llanero: Joropo Music from the Orinoco Plains of Colombia	Grupo Cimarrón/Various	Nominated
2006	Best Traditional World Music Album	Para Todos Ustedes	Los Pleneros de la 21	Nominated
2005	Best Traditional Folk Album	...and the tin pan bended and the story ended...	Dave Van Ronk	Nominated
2005	Best Musical Album for Children	cELLAbration	Various Artists	Won
2006	Best Traditional World Album	Music of Central Asia vol. 2: Invisible Face of the Beloved	Academy of Maqam	Nominated
2006	Best Mexican/Mexican-American Album	¡Llegaron Los Camperos!: Nati Cano's Mariachi Los Camperos	Nati Cano	Nominated
2007	Best Traditional World Music Album	When the Soul is Settled: Music of Iraq	Rahim Alhaj with Souhail Kaspar	Nominated
2007	Best Traditional World Music Album	Singing for Life: Songs of Hope, Healing, and HIV/AIDS in Uganda	Various Artists	Nominated
2008	Best Zydeco Or Cajun Music Album	From Now On	Michael Doucet	Nominated
2008	Best Regional Mexican Album	Amor, Dolor y Lagrimas: Música Ranchera	Nati Cano's Mariachi Los Camperos	Won
2009	Best Tejano Album	Borders y Bailes	Los Texmaniacs	Won
2012	Best Album Notes	Banjo Diary: Lessons from Tradition	Stephen Wade	Nominated
2012	Best Children's Album	Little Seed: Songs for Children by Woody Guthrie	Elizabeth Mitchell	Nominated
2012	Best Historical Album	Woody at 100: The Woody Guthrie Centennial Collection	Woody Guthrie	Nominated
2012	Best Boxed Set or Limited Edition Package	Woody at 100: The Woody Guthrie Centennial Collection	Woody Guthrie	Won
2012	Best Latin Rock, Urban, or Alternative Album	Imaginaries	Quetzal	Won

== Latin Grammy Awards ==
Year	Category	Title	Artist	Result
2004	Best Folk Album	Jíbaro Hasta el Hueso: Mountain Music of Puerto Rico by Ecos de Borinquen	Ecos de Borinquen	Nominated
2007	Best Folk Album	Un Fuego de Sangre Pura: Los Gaiteros de San Jacinto from Colombia	Los Gaiteros de San Jacinto	Won

== Grammy Lifetime Achievement Awards ==
Year	Artist
1972	Mahalia Jackson
1989	Art Tatum
1991	Marian Anderson
1993	Pete Seeger
1993	Bill Monroe
1998	Paul Robeson
2000	Woody Guthrie
2004	Doc Watson
2004	Ella Jenkins
2009	David "Honeyboy" Edwards
