= James E. Bish =

American politician (1859–1925)

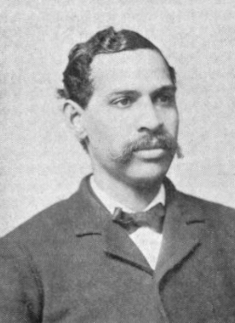

Member of the Illinois House of Representatives
- In office 1893–1894
- Constituency: Cook County

Personal details
- Born: James Ellis Bish; November 1, 1859 St. Francois County, Missouri, U.S.
- Died: November 29, 1925 (aged 66) Chicago, Illinois, U.S.
- Resting place: Lincoln Cemetery
- Party: Republican

James Ellis Bish (October 1, 1859 – November 29, 1925) was a state legislator in Illinois. He served in the Illinois House of Representatives from 1895 to 1897. He wrote Past, Present, and the Future of the Negro.

== Biography ==
He was born October 1, 1859, in St. Francois County, Missouri. His parents were enslaved. He went to school in Belleville, Illinois, and then learned telegraphy at Alton before studying law and moving to Chicago.

In 1893, he was a member of the Illinois House of Representatives, one of several members from Cook County, Illinois. A Republican, he was listed as working in real estate. Democrat Solomon Van Praag (died September 13, 1927) contested Bish's election. Bish was represented in the case by Charles Samuel Deneen. Bish served one term. The next year, he ran for the Illinois Senate as an independent Republican.

He served in the Illinois National Guard. Bish earned the title of colonel at some point before 1898.

In 1898 Bish was serving as Chicago's "city smoke inspector" under the Democratic mayoral administration of Carter Harrison IV In 1913 he was one of ten engineers charged with petty graft, conspiracy and extortion. He was found guilty along with seven others.

He died at his home in Chicago on November 29, 1925, and was buried at Lincoln Cemetery in Blue Island, Illinois.
