= Win Stracke =

American folk musician

Background information
- Also known as: Uncle Win
- Born: Winfred J. Stracke; February 20, 1908; Lorraine, Kansas, U.S.
- Died: June 29, 1991 (aged 83) Chicago, Illinois, U.S.
- Genre: Folk
- Occupation: Singer
- Instruments: Bass singer, guitar

Winfred "Win" J. Stracke (February 20, 1908 – June 29, 1991) was an American folk musician and co-founder of the Old Town School of Folk Music in Chicago, Illinois. Stracke was a Chicago fixture in music, theater, and television in the 1940s and was known for his booming bass voice. Nationally he was known as "Uncle Win" to viewers of his syndicated children's television show on NBC until it was canceled in the wake of the 1950s blacklist.

== Early life ==
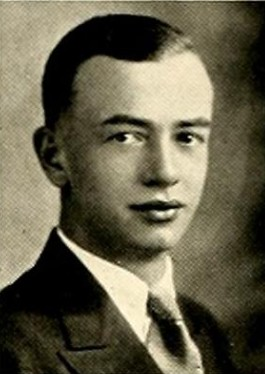
Winfred "Win" Stracke in the 1929 Lake Forest College yearbook

Stracke was born in Lorraine, Kansas but grew up in Chicago's Old Town neighborhood, and had ties to the area his entire life. He was the son of German immigrants and his father was a Baptist pastor who originally practiced in Lorraine and during Win's childhood moved the family to Chicago's Old Town, where Rev. Stracke had been sent to lead the Second Baptist Church. During this period, Chicago's Near North Side was a center for working-class German immigrants, being convenient to both factories and inexpensive post-fire housing. Win discovered his singing talent while still in high school. He had some operatic training, but his interests in the labor movement and American frontier history would draw him towards American folk music. He attended Lake Forest College from Fall 1927 to Spring 1930, where he was voted "Most Promising Freshman" and was a member of the local fraternity Alpha Sigma Kappa. He began his folk singing career in Chicago in 1931, when WLS hired him as a bass singer on their National Barn Dance program. He appeared with the Cumberland Ridge Runners and Smoky Mountain Singers.

== Chicago Artist ==
=== Thespian ===
In 1938 as a member of the Chicago Repertory Theater, a topically progressive theater group in Chicago (they regularly put on plays of pro-union and anti-war topics), Stracke met and began working with Studs Terkel, who would become his lifelong friend. Stracke and Terkel shared common ideas about the way music could be used to promote and assist the labor movement of the mid-20th century. During the 1940s Stracke left to serve in Europe and Africa during World War II; drafted towards the end of the war, he served in an anti-aircraft division. Terkel would later interview Stracke about his experiences in The Good War.

=== I Come for to Sing ===
After returning to Chicago he again joined up with Studs Terkel. As well as an interest in American folk music and the labor movement the two also shared an appreciation for music of different cultures, Stracke was particularly fond of the German folk songs of his heritage. Terkel and Stracke had met the blues singer Big Bill Broonzy through Pete Seeger's labor songs organization, People's Songs. Drawing from these areas and along with fellow musician Lawrence Lane (a classically trained singer who later sang the National Anthem before Chicago Blackhawks games) the group formed I Come for to Sing, a touring folk review. The review played at colleges around the country in the late 1940s and 1950s. The program was set up around a theme with Terkel narrating and Stracke and the other performers singing songs to support that narration.

=== Songs You Can See ===
Another touring show, Songs You Can See, consisted of Stracke and artist Peggy Lipschutz. Stracke would sing songs and ballads and Lipschutz would draw along with them on a large paper canvas as the songs were being sung. The drawings would correspond topically with the song being sung and be complete at the end of the song. The program toured the country mostly in the Midwest, several of their programs dealt with the civil rights movement of the 1960s.

=== Television ===
Stracke was a figure in the Chicago School of Television, a style of early TV shows in the 1950s characterized by improvisational dialog and a variety show-like atmosphere. Along with Studs Terkel, Stracke was a cast member on Studs' Place. He played on one of the first sitcoms, Hawkins Falls, and gained national fame as Uncle Win on his children's program Animal Playtime (on NBC) and Time For Uncle Win. It was notable as one of the first children's programs that treated children's programming as an educational opportunity and not merely entertainment. This program also toured local schools.

== Blacklist Era ==
Caught up in the Hollywood blacklist, Animal Playtime was canceled from NBC, but was revived on local Chicago television after several parents protested its cancellation. Stracke was sympathetic to labor and progressive causes throughout his life, but was never a member of the Communist Party. He described himself as a progressive, but did not identify with the organized party. At the time, however, any empathy to these causes was enough to get a performer blacklisted. Stracke would find work in this period in commercial work that wasn't scrutinized as heavily. He lent his voice in commercials for products like Pie Oh-My, Dean's Milk, and carpets.

== Old Town School of Folk Music ==
"When two or more gather together there is music."

— Win Stracke on singing

In 1956 musician Frank Hamilton met Stracke at the Gate of Horn nightclub in Chicago. Together they founded the Old Town School and developed a teaching method with an emphasis on group learning. The school attempted to teach students popular folk songs of the day – songs by performers like Big Bill Broonzy, Josh White, and Odetta – and introduce students to the wealth of songs from other countries and less well known American folk songs. The school began as a series of lessons at Dawn Greening's home in Oak Park and later moved into a small storefront at 333 W. North Avenue in Old Town. Stracke wanted the classes to end with a jam session called Second Half so all levels of players could have fun playing together. Stracke served as the first director of the School.

Hamilton and Stracke would be musical partners for decades putting on several shows in Chicago and beyond. A program entitled From Bull Run to Birmingham tried to encompass several songs of struggle from history and tie these to the civil rights movement happening in the American south at the time.

Stracke continued to perform and be involved with Chicago music and the Old Town School until his death in 1991.

At the Old Town School of Folk Music Win had both Steve Goodman and John Prine as students. Winn would also bring his singing of folk songs, and these two new artists, to local colleges like Ripon College, Ripon, Wisconsin.

== Discography ==
- Uncle Win's Song Kit vol 1 & 2, 1955
- A Golden Treasury of Songs America Sings, Golden Records 1958
- Folk Songs for the Young, Golden Records 1962
- Three Billion Millionaires (United Nations Musical), Golden Records 1962
- Songs of the Civil War, Golden Records 1965
- Freedom Country, Win Stracke and Norman Luboff, Walton Records 1967
- Songs of Old Town, Flair Records 1968
- Americana, Bally Records 1957
