= A. Wilberforce Williams =

American doctor and journalist (1865–1940)

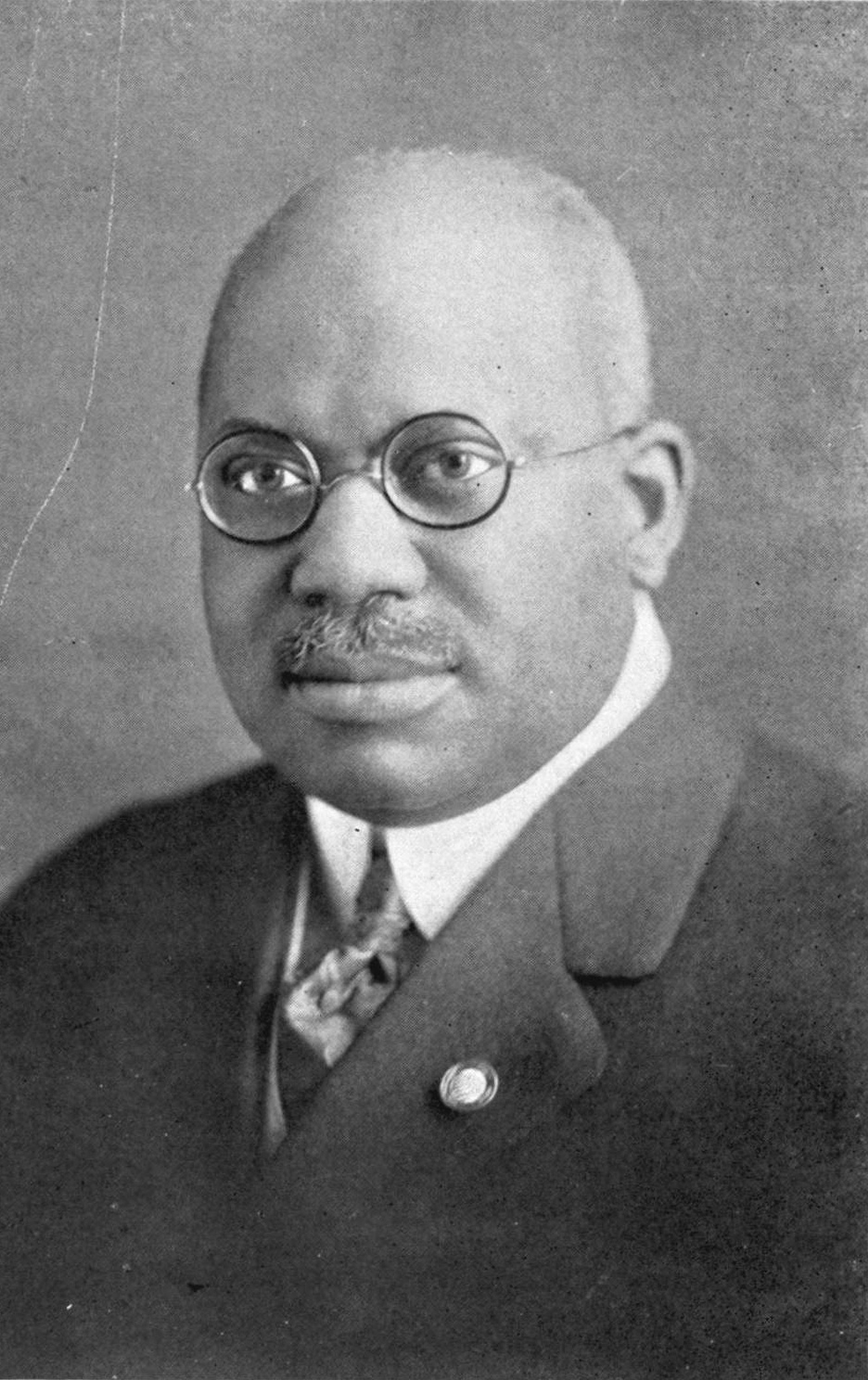
- Born: Albert Wilberforce Williams; January 31, 1865; Monroe, Louisiana, U.S.
- Died: February 26, 1940 (aged 75); Chicago, Illinois, U.S.
- Burial place: Lincoln Cemetery
- Other name: Wilberforce Williams
- Education: Lincoln Institute, Northwestern University Medical School, Sheldon Business College
- Occupations: Physician, surgeon, journalist, educator
- Spouse: Mary Elizabeth Tibbs

Albert Wilberforce Williams (January 31, 1865 – February 26, 1940), was an American physician, surgeon, educator, and journalist. He worked in Chicago for most of his career and specialized in internal medicine, the treatment of tuberculosis, and heart disease. Williams wrote a health column for The Chicago Defender, an African-American newspaper.

== Early life and education ==
Albert Wilberforce Williams was born on January 31, 1865, in Monroe, Louisiana, to African American parents Flora and Baptise Williams. For the first 13 years of his life, he lived in a cabin on a plantation.

He attended the Normal School at Lincoln Institute in Jefferson City, Missouri. After graduating he taught summer school in Kansas City, Missouri, and continued his studies.

After choosing medicine as his profession, Williams attended Northwestern University Medical School, graduating in 1894. He also attended Sheldon Business College of Chicago, graduating in 1907.

== Career ==
From 1897 until 1940, Williams worked as a staff physician at Chicago's Provident Hospital, working alongside noted cardiologist and hospital founder Daniel Hale Williams. He was also the head of the medical department post-graduate school at Provident Hospital.

He wrote a health column for The Chicago Defender, titled "Dr. A. Wilberforce Williams Talks on Preventive Measures, First Aid Remedies, Hygienics and Sanitation." Williams advocated for better sanitary practices, hygiene, proper ventilation, preventative medical care, and against superstition. He also wrote about venereal diseases and masturbation, at a time when it was against the cultural normal.

The United States government selected Williams as a member of an advisory board, to supervise the work of the local exemptions board. Williams was the president of the Physicians, Dentists, and Pharmacists Association of Chicago. He was a member of the Knights of Pythias of North America, South America, Europe, Asia, Africa and Australia, and served as their "grand medical director".

He corresponded with W. E. B. Du Bois twice, which is part of the University of Massachusetts Amherst Libraries archives; the first correspondence was regarding the second Pan-African Congress (1921), and the second was his interest in the Encyclopedia of the Negro (1935).

== Personal life ==
In 1902, Williams married Mary Elizabeth Tibbs, a school teacher from Kentucky.

He died from a heart attack in February 1940 at the age of 75, in Chicago. He is buried in Lincoln Cemetery in Blue Island, Illinois.

== See also ==
- The National Cyclopedia of the Colored Race
