= Jo Mapes =

Jo Mapes (July 20, 1931 - February 2, 2018) was an American folk singer, songwriter, critic and writer. She was prominent in the folk music revival of the 1950s and 1960s and later became an advertising copywriter and nightclub critic for the Sun-Times in Chicago.

== Life ==
She was born Joanne Claire Coombs in Chicago, and moved to Los Angeles with her mother when in her teens. At Thomas Starr King Junior High School she was friendly with Odetta Felious, and developed a love of folk songs. In the early 1950s she began singing and playing guitar in folk clubs, and in 1955 she appeared on the TV talent show Chance of a Lifetime. She moved to San Francisco in 1957, and later to New York City, and performed in clubs and concert venues around the country.

Mapes was described by Shel Silverstein as "the best female folk singer and guitar player around, with unique singing style and stage presence." She was featured in the pilot episode of the ABC TV series Hootenanny in 1962, and later appeared in several episodes of the show. She recorded albums for Kapp Records, including The Hootenanny Star (1962), as well as appearing on several Hootenanny compilations. She also wrote songs including "Come On In", recorded by The Association, The Monkees, and others; and "Come and Open Your Eyes", recorded by Spanky and Our Gang. In 1964 she released And You Were On My Mind on the short-lived FM label set up by Pete Kameron and Monte Kay, but the company went bankrupt before the album could be distributed.

In 1964 she married banjoist Fleming Brown. She retired from performing after a farewell concert at Carnegie Hall, and settled in Chicago to raise a family. She taught at the Old Town School of Folk Music, and then worked as an award-winning copywriter, producer and jingle writer in the advertising industry, her clients including Kodak, United Airlines and Kellogg's; she provided the song for a Raisin Bran commercial. From 1968 to 1978 she worked as entertainment critic, columnist, and feature writer at the Chicago Sun-Times, and in 1986 she helped set up Artists In Evidence, a club associated with the Artists In Residence apartment building. More recently she has occasionally performed at clubs in Chicago.
