= Frank Hamilton (American musician) =

American folk musician

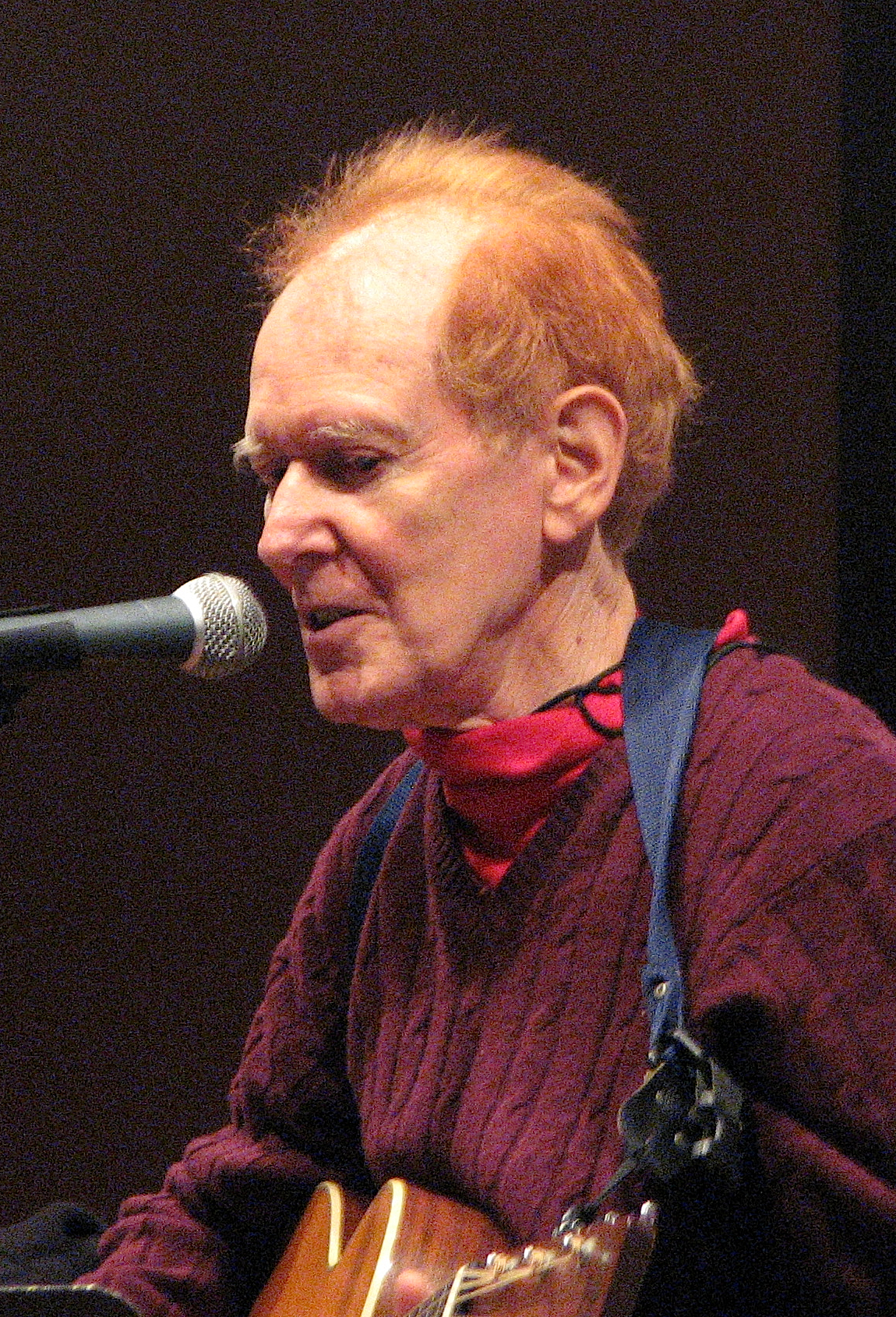
- Frank Hamilton teaching at the Old Town School of Folk Music in Chicago, IL. November 2007

Background information
- Born: August 3, 1934 (age 91)
- Origin: United States
- Genres: Folk
- Occupations: Singer-songwriter, music teacher
- Instruments: Guitar, banjo, harmonica, mandolin
- Labels: Folkways Records, Vanguard Records

Frank Hamilton (born August 3, 1934) is an American folk musician, collector of folk songs, and educator. He co-founded the Old Town School of Folk Music in Chicago, Illinois in 1957. As a performer, he has recorded for several labels, including Folkways Records. He was a member of the folk group The Weavers in the early 1960s, and appeared at the first Newport Folk Festival in 1959. He was the house musician – playing guitar and other folk instruments – for Chicago's Gate of Horn, the nation's first folk music nightclub. After many years of teaching, playing, and singing in California he married a third time, and with his wife relocated to Atlanta, where he performs on banjo, guitar (many styles, including jazz), ukulele, voice, and other instruments and co-founded the Frank Hamilton School in 2015.

== Early days ==
Hamilton was an only child. His father, Frank Strawn Hamilton, died before his son's birth; he had been a California socialist philosopher, genius street-corner orator, and mentor to Jack London. His mother, Judith Bley Strawn Hamilton, then married Phil Street, who had been a good friend of Hamilton's father; he encouraged his stepson's songwriting. That marriage ended when Frank was 12, and he never saw Street again. Classical music was what Hamilton, a.k.a. Strawn-Hamilton, first heard: he listened as his mother taught classical piano in their Los Angeles home. His mother – who changed her name from Gladys Antoinette to Judith after seeing the actress Judith Anderson perform – supplemented her income as a dance accompanist. As a teenager Hamilton developed an interest in the labor movement, playing jazz trombone with Local 47 at Club 47, and also with the Los Angeles City College jazz band. He was especially influenced by Louis Armstrong and Charlie Parker, and learning guitar, studying jazz guitar with Sam Surace. He began learning and collecting folk songs, with a special interest in the music of the American South; he spent much of the late 1940s and early 1950s traveling there, performing in bars and on street corners. He returned to Los Angeles in 1953, and with Jack Elliott and Guy Carawan formed The Dusty Road Boys, who toured the Midwest. At Will Geer's artist colony in Topanga, California. he played with Woody Guthrie; he also met Bess Lomax Hawes there, absorbing her teaching methods.

== Chicago Old Town School of Folk Music ==
In 1956, at the Gate of Horn folksong nightclub in Oak Park, Illinois, Hamilton met Win Stracke, who took an interest in his teaching career. In Dawn Greening's dining room in Oak Park, Hamilton began teaching a group of 15 instrumentalists. In 1957 Hamilton, Stracke and Greening recruited teachers and an organizer, rented a space, and founded the Old Town School of Folk Music. Hamilton taught guitar and banjo and served as unofficial dean. Several hundred prospective students, performers, and educators attended the first session, and famous singers and folklorists – without compensation – began performing during the Second Half. Among them were Pete Seeger, Odetta, Studs Terkel, Doc Watson, Mahalia Jackson, Bill Monroe, the Weavers, and Jean Ritchie. Second Half, which follows the class lessons, is essential to the Old Town School method: both teachers and students sing and play together at their own level, and especially talented men and women are invited to perform. The School continues to promote the spontaneity, playful joyousness, improvisation, personal relationships, and progressive ideals which are hallmarks of Hamilton's teaching.

== Atlanta years ==
After decades of living in California, in 1985 Hamilton married Mary Susan Doyle Smith; she became a supportive stepmother to his son Evan from an earlier marriage. Mary worked for Delta Air Lines, and Hamilton relocated with her to Atlanta. She accompanied him on guitar, banjo, ukulele, and autoharp, and she also taught guitar. The occasion for the founding of the Frank Hamilton Folk School was Mary's sudden death in 2014. Bob Bakert, a friend of Frank's, volunteered to serve as Master of Ceremonies for the memorial concert for her, at Steve's Live Music in Sandy Springs. Concerned for Frank's well-being, and having heard of his interest in starting a second folk music school in Atlanta, Bakert suggested helping him achieve that goal; Hamilton responded positively. Together, they co-founded the Frank Hamilton School in the fall of 2015 in Atlanta, but the school soon outgrew its first location; this had also occurred in Chicago. Shelley Satonin-Hershkovits was the executive director of the School at Oakhurst Baptist Church in Decatur until 2021. Under the current leadership of Hamilton and Maura Hill Nicholson the school now meets in eight-week sessions at the Gillespie Building at Decatur Legacy Park. Nicholson teaches fiddle and various other classes, and Frank rotates teaching several classes including advanced guitar, ukulele, swing, and music theory.

== Discography ==
VOCAL

- "Folk Festival at Newport" Vol 3, Vanguard Records VRS 9063 and VDS 2054 stereo
- "A Folksinger's Folksinger" Concertdisc Records M-1054
- "Frank Hamilton Sings Folk Songs" Folkways Records FA-2437
- "Long Lonesome Home," 1999
- "Music From the Newport Folk Festival" Folkways Records FA-2431
- "Nonesuch and Other Folk Tunes" (with Pete Seeger) Folkways Records FA-2439
- "The Twelve String Story" Horizon Records (subsidiary A and M Records)
- "The Weavers Reunion at Carnegie Hall" 1963, Vanguards Records VRS-9139, VSD-2150 stereo
- "The World of Frank and Valuch" Phillips Records PHS-600-058

ACCOMPANIST and STUDIO MUSICIAN

- "The Art of the Five-String Banjo" Riverside Records 12-815 (OP) Reissued –
- "Folk Festival at Newport" VRS 9062 Vol. 1, accompanying Martha Schlamme; "
- "Folk Festival at Newport" Vol. 3, accompanying Barard Dane
- "Folk Festival at Newport" VRS 9063 and VSD 2054, accompanying Lynn Gold
- "Golden Guitars" Rod McKuen, Stereo Sound Records SA-2
- "Hearty and Hellish" Tradition Records, accompanying Clancy Brothers and Tommy Makem
- "Martha Schlamme at the Gate of Horn" Vanguard Records
- "Railroad Bill and Other Folk Songs" Elecktra Records, accompanying Walter Raim, producer
- "Won’t You Be My Friend" Activity Records, Educational Activities Inc., AR-544 accompanying Marcia Berman and Patty Zeitlin
- Nonesuch and Other Folk Tunes for Harmonica, Flute, Recorder, Mandolin, Guitar, Banjo, 12-String Guitar, and Voices, Frank Hamilton and Pete Seeger, Folkways Records, 1959.
- Frank Hamilton Sings Folk Songs, Folkways Records 1962. FW02437.
- The Folk Singer's Folk Singer, Sound in the Room Records
- The World of Frank & Valucha, Frank Hamilton and Valucha deCastro, Philips Records, 1962

== Filmography ==
- "Silent Running" for Peter Schikele
- "Wild Rovers" for Jerry Goldsmith
- "Homecoming" (TV special) for Jerry Goldsmith
- "Subterraneans" (MGM) for Andre Previn
- "America" (TV special) for Gerry Fried
- "Glidden Tour" (documentary) for Win Stracke
- "A Time Out of War" 1952, Academy Award Winner for short subject for Dennis and Terry Sanders
- "Sunshine" (TV special) for Bob Bain and John Denver
- "The Surfers" American Educational Films, 1964
- "Survival" (TV documentary special) for Nelson Riddle
- "Transportation" (Educational film) for Churchill Films, 1964
- Industrial films for Standard Oil and other clients, Chicago (1957–1962)

== Composer of popular songs ==
- "And We Were Strangers" with Ernie Sheldon, Almo Publishing, ASCAP, sung by Patty Duke (on the Patty Duke TV show) *"Baby Blue", United Artists Publishing BM
- "Baby What I Mean" with Ernie Sheldon, United Artists Publishing, BMI
- "The Drifters" performed by ...... : No. 60 on Billboard Hot 100
- "I Feel It" with Ernie Sheldon, Almo Publishing ASCAP performed by Peggy Lee : No. 4 on Easy Listening Charts in Billboard Magazine
- "Telling Me Lies" with Ernie Sheldon, Almo Publishing, ASCAP

== Live performances ==
- SOLO: The Gate of Horn (Chicago) 1957–1962; The Ash Grove (Los Angeles)1960s; The Ark (Madison, WI); Bitter End (New York City)
- GROUP The Weavers, 1963: Carnegie Hall and Lincoln Center, New York City; Lisner Auditorium, Washington DC; Forest Hills Stadium, Monterrey Folk Festival

== Teaching ==
GEORGIA

2015–present Instructor of Advanced Guitar, Swing Guitar, and Ukulele, Frank Hamilton Folk School, Atlanta
2009–2014: Private teacher of master class in jazz guitar, Decatur; 1987–2005: Private classes in guitar, banjo, autoharp, mandolin, Decatur;1984–1985: Music and guitar instructor, Paideia School, Atlanta; 1984–1985: Guitar instructor at DeKalb Community College Continuing Education, Decatur, and at Kennesaw College Continuing Education in Marietta

MASSACHUSETTS

1983: Guitar instructor at Cambridge Center for Adult Education in Cambridge; 1982: Guitar instructor at Classic Guitar Workshop in Marblehead, MA and at Framingham Performing Arts Center in Framingham

CALIFORNIA

1981: Staff music instructor of theory and jazz guitar at Dick Grove Music Workshop in Studio City; Music theory instructor at Horizon School, West Los Angeles; Guitar instructor and songwriting teacher at The Learning Tree, Canoga Park; Guitar instructor for the Recreation Department of UCLA, Westwood Village.
1979–1980: Private classes in guitar, five-string banjo, mandolin, music theory, sight-reading and ear-training, Tarzana
1976–1978: Guitar instructor and teacher of folk music at University of California, Santa Barbara (Extension Div.)
1976–1978: Instructor of Jazz Guitar Workshop at Santa Barbara City College (Continuing Education Div.) in Santa Barbara
1975–1978: Private studio instructor of music theory, sight-reading, ear-training, guitar and related stringed instruments at Westwood Musical Instruments, West Los Angeles
1973–1975: Music instructor of music theory, sight-reading, ear-training, guitar and related stringed instruments at the Music Nook, Pacific Palisades
1970–1973: Principal private studio instructor of music theory, sight-reading, ear-training, guitar and related stringed instruments at Barney Kessel's Music World in Hollywood; 1963–1969: Guitar instructor and teacher of folk music at UCLA (Extension Div.) in West Los Angeles

ILLINOIS

1957–1963: Vice President, co-founder and director of teaching at The Old Town School of Folk Music in Chicago

CALIFORNIA

1950–1959: Seminar leader in folk music for USC at summer sessions in Idyllwild

RHODE ISLAND

1959: Seminar leader in folk music at The Newport Folk Music Festival at Freebody Park

MASSACHUSETTS

1957: Workshop leader in folk music at the Pinewoods Folk Music Camp in Buzzards Bay
