= Lake Dick, Arkansas =

- Unincorporated community
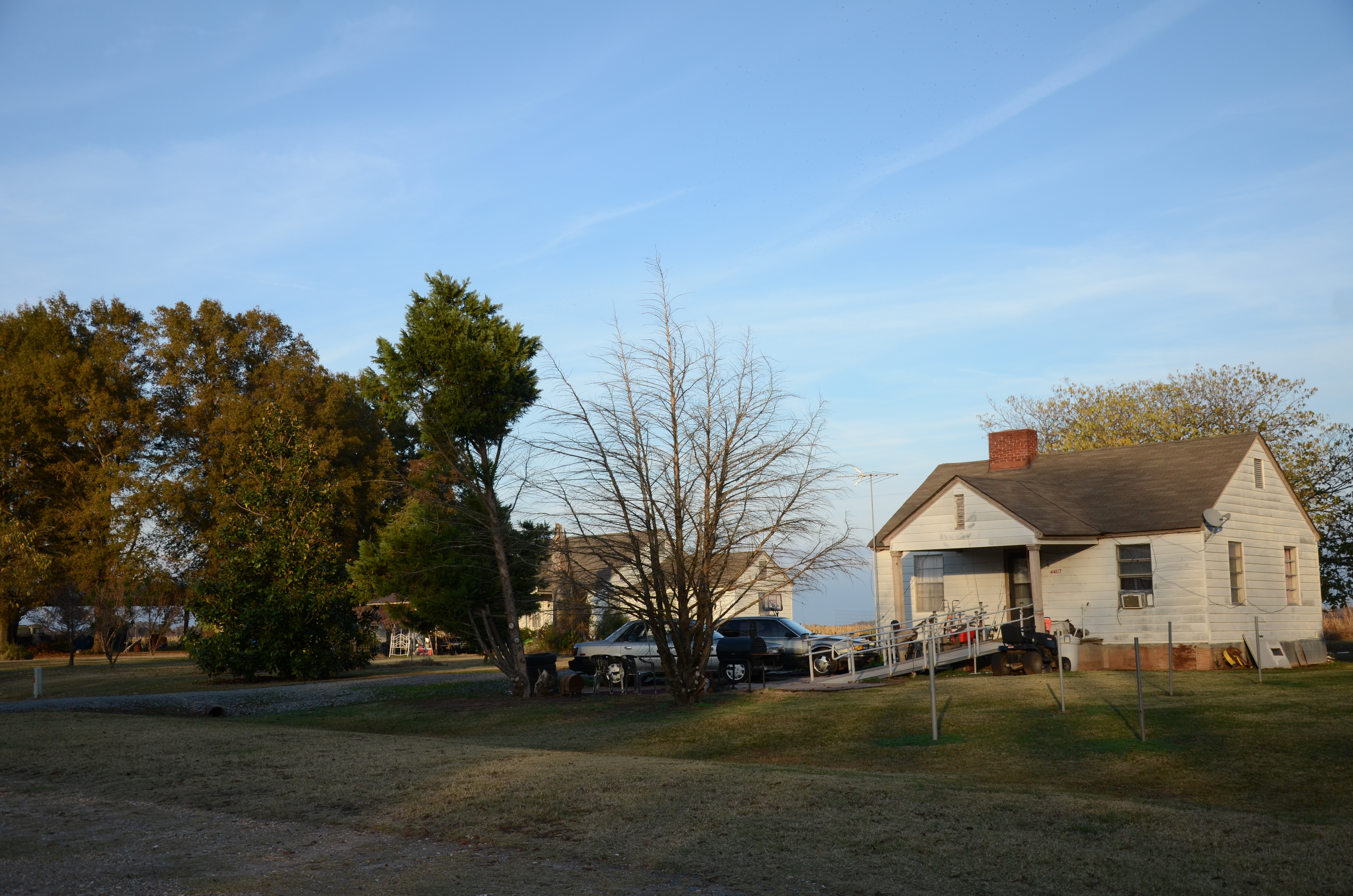

- Location within Arkansas Location within the United States
- Coordinates: 34°15′03″N 91°50′22″W
- Country: United States
- State: Arkansas
- County: Jefferson
- Elevation: 203 ft (62 m)
- Time zone: UTC-6 (Central (CST))
  - Summer (DST): UTC-5 (CDT)
- Area code: 870
- GNIS feature ID: 77430

Lake Dick is an unincorporated community in Jefferson County, Arkansas, United States. Lake Dick is northeast of Pine Bluff and south of Altheimer.

The Resettlement Administration, a New Deal program which supported farming projects, established the community on the shore of Lake Dick in 1936. The administration built the community's buildings in the next two years and relocated 80 farming families from throughout Arkansas to the community. Unlike most Resettlement Administration farming communities, which divided farmland among their residents, Lake Dick was a cooperative farming project; families jointly participated in producing crops on community farmland according to a work schedule. Roughly one-third of the community's original buildings are still in place; most of the others, particularly the houses, have been relocated to other nearby settlements.

The community was added to the National Register of Historic Places in 1975.

== Education ==
It is a part of the Pine Bluff School District. The schools serving Lake Dick are Park/Greenville School for preschool, James Matthews Elementary School, Robert F. Morehead Middle School, and Dollarway High School.

Lake Dick was previously in the Altheimer School District. The Altheimer-Sherrill district was created in 1979 when the Altheimer and Sherrill districts merged. In 1993, that merged into the Altheimer Unified School District (operator of Altheimer-Sherrill High School). This district merged into the Dollarway district on July 10, 2006. Altheimer-Sherrill High closed in 2007, with students moved to Dollarway High. Altheimer Martin Elementary School closed in 2013.

In December 2020 the Arkansas State Board of Education ruled that the Dollarway School District should merge into the Pine Bluff School District as of July 1, 2021; the post-merger school district operated all existing schools from both districts. Accordingly, the attendance boundary maps of the respective schools remained the same for the 2021–2022 school year, and all DSD territory became a part of the PBSD territory. The exception was with the pre-kindergarten levels, as all PBSD areas are now assigned to Forrest Park/Greenville School, including the territory from the former Dollarway district. In 2023 the district announced that Dollarway High would merge into Pine Bluff High School, and that Morehead Middle School would become the only middle school for all of the Pine Bluff School District.

== Natives ==
- Big Bill Broonzy, American musician, was raised in Lake Dick

== See also ==
- National Register of Historic Places listings in Jefferson County, Arkansas
