= Joshua Altheimer =

American pianist (1910–1940)

Joshua Altheimer (May 17, 1910 – November 18, 1940) (Note: Although some sources give his date of death as February 18, 1940, that cannot be correct as he is known to have recorded later that year.) was an American pianist who is remembered for accompanying Big Bill Broonzy, Lonnie Johnson, Sonny Boy Williamson and others on influential blues recordings made in Chicago in the 1930s. He was described by Broonzy as "the best blues piano player I ever heard", and by blues historian Hugues Panassié as "the greatest blues pianist on records".

== Biography ==
He was born in Altheimer, Arkansas, which he claimed had been founded by his grandfather, and would therefore have had family connections with the leading Chicago law firm of Altheimer & Gray. Joshua Altheimer was relatively light-skinned; it is believed that his grandfather (Louis Altheimer) was an immigrant from Germany and his grandmother an ex-slave (Epsy Marks). His father was Silas Altheimer. It is thought likely that he received some formal musical training, explaining his technique and "perfect tempo". He worked for some years in Arkansas, where he met and probably first performed with blues singer Big Bill Broonzy, who grew up in the same area. Altheimer then moved to Chicago, and in 1937 began working as Broonzy's regular piano accompanist.

According to writer Roger House, Altheimer "brought a nimble, boogie-woogie piano style to the urban blues trio". He became a key part of Broonzy's band in performance and on recordings, and was sought out by other blues performers of the time including Sonny Boy Williamson I, Washboard Sam, Jazz Gillum, and Lonnie Johnson. He played piano at the 1939 session on which Johnson used an electric guitar for the first time, and recorded prolifically as a sideman during 1939 and 1940. He is described by Bruce Eder at AllMusic as "a strong player, with a right hand capable of coaxing rich, diverse figures out of his instrument". However, he made no recordings as a solo or featured performer.

Joshua Altheimer died in Chicago in November 1940 at the age of 30, the result of various ailments including pneumonia. In 2013 the Killer Blues Headstone Project placed a headstone for Joshua Altheimer at Lincoln Cemetery in Chicago.
