= Fleming Brown =

American singer-songwriter

- Fleming at the Old Town School of Folk Music

Background information
- Born: March 1, 1926; Marshall, Missouri, U.S.
- Origin: Chicago, Illinois, U.S.
- Died: 1984
- Genres: Folk
- Occupation: songwriter
- Instrument(s): Guitar, banjo
- Years active: 1960s – 1970s

Fleming Brown (March 1, 1926 – 1984), born in Marshall, Missouri, United States, was an American banjo player and one of the early teachers at Chicago's Old Town School of Folk Music. As an artist, Brown specialized in traditional songs of the Southern Appalachians. He was influenced by old-time banjo players such as Uncle Dave Macon and Dock Boggs. Brown supported himself as a graphic artist and as such never performed widely outside of Chicago.

Brown learned the banjo from Doc Hopkins, an old-time singer who hosted a morning radio show on WLS in Chicago. He would have his lesson at the studio after the show daily. As a banjo player Brown traveled much learning technique from other banjo players like Doc Hopkins, Bascom Lamar Lunsford, Grandpa Jones, Hobart Smith, Frank Proffitt. In 1963 Brown recorded the banjo player Hobart Smith for a record released as The 1963 Fleming Brown Tapes.

In 1953 he joined the "I Come for to Sing" group with Studs Terkel, Larry Lane, Chet Roble and Big Bill Broonzy. Also in that year, he hosted a folk music radio show on Chicago's WFMT which was entitled "The Midnight Special" since it began at midnight on Saturdays.

At the Old Town School, Brown mentored banjoist Stephen Wade who eventually took over teaching Fleming's class in 1974.

Fleming has performed at the Asheville, North Carolina, Festival, the Newport Folk Festival, and the University of Chicago Folk Festival.

In 1984, at the age of fifty-eight, Fleming Brown was found dead, after a few days of inexplicable absence, by some of his friends in his bathtub in circumstances that have never been fully clarified.

== Discography ==
- Appalachian Banjo Songs and Ballads, Folk-Legacy Records, 1962
- Little Rosewood Casket and Other Songs of Joy, Stephen Wade, Merrywang, 1984
- The Folk Music of the Newport Folk Festival 1959-60 Volume 2, Folkways Records FA 2432, contains two songs by Fleming Brown, singing and playing banjo on "Rake and a Rambling Bride" and "Tom Hubbard"
