= Armistead S. Pride =

American journalist and academic

Armistead S. Pride (27 May 1907 in Washington, D.C. – 5 April 1991 in Chicago) was an American journalist, author and professor emeritus at Lincoln University in Jefferson City, Missouri. An African American, he headed Lincoln University's School of Journalism and journalism department from 1943 to his retirement in 1976.

He graduated from the University of Michigan, University of Chicago, Medill School of Journalism at Northwestern University (Masters). His dissertation from the University of Chicago was "Criticisms of the metaphor in England, 1660-1740". He received his doctorate from Weinberg College of Arts and Sciences in 1950. His dissertation was “A Register and History of Negro Newspapers in the United States: 1927-50". He wrote for various newspapers. Northwestern University awarded him an honorary doctorate of humane letters after his retirement.

He was the book review editor of Journalism Educator and wrote an article on nomenclature used to refer to Black Americans.

He had a wife, Marie, and daughter, Lorene Loiacano.

== Writings ==
- Pride, Armistead Scott (1950). A register and history of negro newspapers in the United States, 1827–1950 (Thesis). OCLC 1214016.
- Pride, Armistead Scott (1953). Negro newspapers on microfilm; a selected list. Library of Congress, Photoduplication Service. hdl:2027/mdp.39015036917030. LCCN 53-60015. OCLC 580132.
- Pride, Armistead Scott (1968). The Black American and the Press. W. Ritchie Press. OCLC 272596.
- Pride, Armistead Scott; Wilson, Clint C. (1997). A History of the Black Press. Howard University Press. ISBN 978-0-88258-192-7. OCLC 36476957.

== See also ==
- Irvine Garland Penn
