= Stephen Wade (musician) =

American singer-songwriter

- Born: February 13, 1953 (age 73); Chicago, Illinois
- Origin: Chicago, Illinois, United States
- Genre: Folk
- Occupations: Musician, writer, researcher
- Instrument: Banjo
- Labels: Smithsonian Folkways, Flying Fish, County, Patuxent

Stephen Wade (born February 13, 1953) is an American folk musician, writer, and researcher.

== Early life ==
Stephen Wade grew up in Chicago in the 1950s and 1960s where, early on, he came to know a number of vernacular musicians who had moved north to the city from the Mississippi Delta and the Southern Appalachians. Wade started playing blues guitar at age eleven, and by his teens, began focusing on the five-string banjo.

Wade met banjo player and singer Fleming Brown at Chicago's Old Town School of Folk Music in early 1972 and by the mid-‘70s, Brown passed his classes over to Wade to teach. In 1972, Wade also began accompanying Brown's teacher, Doc Hopkins, the celebrated Kentucky-born, WLS National Barn Dance performer. Under the tutelage of these two mentors, Wade immersed himself in the banjo, traditional music, and American folklore. They, along with other scholars, collectors, and performers, encouraged him to seek out traditional musicians elsewhere, as well as to research American humor and folk tales from both living sources and archival resources.

== Banjo Dancing ==
Wade developed Banjo Dancing in the late 1970s, a one-person theatrical performance combining storytelling, traditional music, and percussive dance. The show opened in Chicago in May 1979 where it ran for thirteen months, including an invited performance at the White House. After a short run at New York's Century Theatre (10/21/80 - 11/30/80), Wade brought Banjo Dancing to Washington, D.C.’s Arena Stage in 1981 where he was initially booked for three weeks. His engagement there ran ten years, becoming during that time one of the longest-running, off-Broadway shows in the country.

In 1986, Wade appeared in the public television documentary The Unquiet Library, a study of the Library of Congress’s music division. This led the following year to his writing and narrating Catching the Music, a celebration of the banjo and its learning.

On the Way Home, Wade's second critically acclaimed theatre show, opened in 1989 in Washington, D.C. In the early 1990s, he took both this show and Banjo Dancing on the road. Wade received the Joseph Jefferson award in 1993 for his Chicago run of On the Way Home. A five-time Helen Hayes award nominee, in 2003, Wade received the Helen Hayes / Charles MacArthur award as composer, adaptor, and musical director for the world premiere of Zora Neale Hurston’s Polk County.

== Writing ==
Wade's essays, reviews, and articles have appeared in such publications as American Music, ARSC Journal, Encyclopedia of Appalachia, Studies in Popular Culture, Encyclopedia of Chicago, Musical Quarterly, American Archivist, Southern Quarterly, Journal of Country Music, New Letters, Beloit Magazine, Folklife Center News, Chicago Tribune, and the Washington Post’s Book World.

Stephen Wade has written the award-winning book, The Beautiful Music All Around Us: Field Recordings and the American Experience, (which includes a companion CD in the cloth edition), published in August 2012 by the University of Illinois Press.

September 1, 2026 marked the formal publication of his new book, Our Common Life: Folksong from the Front Porch to the Concert Hall (University of Illinois Press).

== Recognition ==
In fall 2013, The Beautiful Music All Around Us received the ASCAP Deems Taylor Award, and also the Association for Recorded Sound Collections (ARSC) 2013 Award, for Best History in the category of Folk, Ethnic, or World Music. This 504 page study grew out of his 1997 Rounder collection, A Treasury of Library of Congress Field Recordings. In turn, that album gave rise to his folksong commentaries that have aired on National Public Radio’s Morning Edition and All Things Considered.

Recognition for The Beautiful Music All Around Us has continued, and in November 2016, Wade became the first-ever individual to receive the Judith McCulloh Public Sector Award from the Society for Ethnomusicology.

Wade released Banjo Diary: Lessons from Tradition in September 2012. The album, which explores musical knowledge passed across the generations, received a Grammy Award nomination, recognized at the 55th Annual Grammy Awards.

== Recent career ==
In April 2023, Patuxent Music published Hands on the Tune, a live album of Stephen Wade's concert performances recorded in 2022 and 2017.

Wade's album, A Storyteller's Story: Sources of Banjo Dancing, was released by Patuxent Music in October 2019.

Americana Concert: Alan Jabbour and Stephen Wade at the Library of Congress, went into release on the Patuxent label in December 2017.

In June 2017, Smithsonian Folkways issued Wade's all-solo album, Across the Amerikee: Showpieces from Coal Camp to Cattle Trail.

In 2013–2014 Wade served as Resident Artist/Scholar Fellow, Department of Music, Columbian College of Arts and Sciences, George Washington University, and as 2013, George A. Miller Visiting Scholar, Center for Advanced Study, University of Illinois at Urbana-Champaign.

From 2015 through 2019 Wade directed all five years of the American Roots Music Program at Colorado's Rocky Ridge Music Center. In November 2019, Academy Award-winning producer and director Paul Wagner completed a short film on The Beautiful Music All Around Us.

== Selected discography ==
- Hands on the Tune Patuxent Music Patuxent CD-369 (2023)
- A Storyteller's Story: Sources of Banjo Dancing Patuxent Music Patuxent CD-333 (2019)
- Americana Concert: Alan Jabbour and Stephen Wade at the Library of Congress Patuxent Music Patuxent CD-308 (2017).
- Across the Amerikee: Showpieces from Coal Camp to Cattle Trail. Smithsonian Folkways SFW 40223 (2017).
- Banjo Diary: Lessons from Tradition. Smithsonian Folkways SFW 40208 (2012).
- Dancing In the Parlor. County COCD 2721 (1997).
- Dancing Home. Flying Fish FF 70543 (1990).

Also:

- Various artists, On Top of Old Smoky: New Old-Time Smoky Mountain Music. Great Smoky Mountains Association (2016). Performer.
- Various artists, The Patuxent Banjo Project: The Best of Washington, DC, Baltimore, MD, Northern VA, and Southern PA. Patuxent CD 250 (2014). Performer.
- Hobart Smith, In Sacred Trust: The 1963 Fleming Brown Tapes. Smithsonian Folkways SFW 40141 (2005). Producer and annotator.
- Tony Ellis, Sounds Like Bluegrass to Me. Copper Creek 0174 (1999). Producer and annotator.
- Various artists, Black Appalachia. Rounder CD 1823 (1999). Annotator.
- Various artists, A Treasury of Library of Congress Field Recordings. Rounder CD 1500 (1997). Producer and annotator.
- Various artists, The Art of the Banjo. Sonoton SCB 248 (1997). Producer, annotator, and performer.
- Tony Ellis, Farewell My Home. Flying Fish FF 70620 (1993). Producer and annotator.
- Various artists, Authentic America, Vols. I and II. Sonoton SAS 036 and SAS 037 (1990). Producer, annotator, and performer.
- Tony Ellis, Dixie Banner. Flying Fish FF 444 (1987). Producer, annotator, and performer.
- Fleming Brown, Little Rosewood Casket and Other Songs of Joy. Merrywang 1953 (1984). Producer and annotator.
