= The National Cyclopedia of the Colored Race =

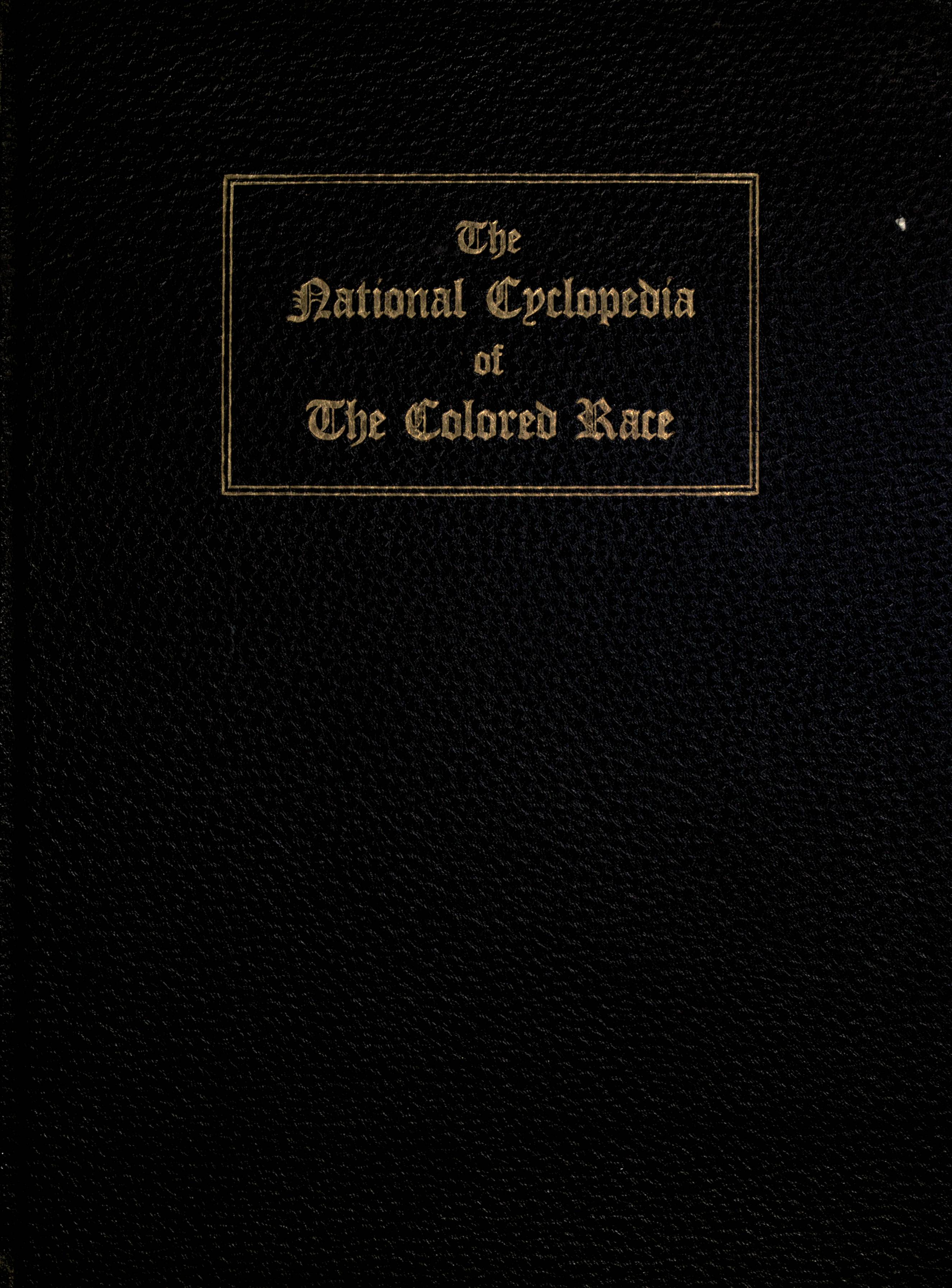
Cover of The National Cyclopedia of the Colored Race

The National Cyclopedia of the Colored Race (also known as the Cyclopedia of the Colored Race) was an encyclopedia about subjects of interest to African Americans published in 1919. Clement Richardson, a faculty member at Tuskegee Institute who became president of Lincoln Institute within a year or two of its publication, was the editor. Financed by a New Orleans–based group of African Americans, it was published by the National Publishing Company of Montgomery, Alabama.

A 1920 review in the Journal of African American History criticized a lack of details on its subjects but said it would be a valuable sourcebook over time.

Associate editors were:

- Dr. C.V. Roman of Nashville, Tennessee, a professor at Meharry Medical College
- W.T.B. Williams of Hampton Institute, Virginia, a Field Agent of the Jeannes and Slater Funds (Jeanes Foundation and John F. Slater Fund)
- M. Minton II, M. D. of Philadelphia, Pennsylvania, a member of the Board of Directors of Mercy Hospital
- Silas X. Floyd of Augusta, Georgia, Principal of City Schools
- Dr. R.E. Jones of New Orleans, Louisiana, Editor of South Western Christian Advocate
- Dr. A.F. Owens of Selma, Alabama, Dean of Theological Department at Selma University
- Fred Randolph Moore of New York City, Editor of the New York Age

== See also ==
- Negro Yearbook
- Encyclopedia Africana
