= Trouble in Mind (Big Bill Broonzy album) =

Studio album by Big Bill Broonzy
- Released: February 22, 2000
- Recorded: 1956–1957
- Genre: Country blues
- Length: 1:13:39
- Label: Smithsonian Folkways

Professional ratings
Review scores
Source	Rating
The Penguin Guide to Blues Recordings	4/4 stars

Trouble in Mind is an album by American blues musician Big Bill Broonzy. It was released on February 22, 2000 by Smithsonian Folkways. The album consists of traditional folk, blues, and spiritual songs featuring Broonzy accompanying himself on acoustic guitar and a guest appearance by Pete Seeger. Suffering from cancer, Broonzy realized his time was limited and hence recorded extensively between 1956 and 1957. While most of the work draws from the album Big Bill Broonzy Sings Country Blues (1957), arranged by Moses Asch and Charles Edward Smith, Trouble in Mind is also sourced from concert broadcasts and interviews recorded late in Broonzy's career.

Like other albums issued by Smithsonian Folkways, Trouble in Mind has been kept in print; the production quality of the album is higher than most installments of the label's catalogue. An accompanying booklet, arranged by Jeff Place and Anthony Seeger, includes photos and notes documenting Broonzy's stint with Folkways. While Trouble in Mind only represents the latter portion of Broonzy's career, music critics have recognized the album for its historically significant material.

== Background and recording ==
An extensively recorded bluesman, Big Bill Broonzy left the United States to tour Europe in 1951, becoming the first Chicago blues player to perform for European audiences. Broonzy previously spent time in Iowa, where he honed a repertoire which remained a fixture of his concerts and recordings for the remainder of the decade. With bluesmen such as Muddy Waters and Howlin' Wolf amplifying their music, resulting in the popularity of the electric blues, Broonzy decided to reinvent himself as a folk blues musician to capitalize on another prevailing trend, the folk revival.

Folkways Records producer Moses Asch and New York-based jazz critic Charles Edward Smith took an interest to Broonzy's folk material. Ashe envisioned recording Broonzy in a style reminiscent of his 1930s records: as a solo performer accompanying himself on acoustic guitar. According to musicologist Jeff Place, Broonzy's stripped-down approach brought his singing and lyrics to the forefront. Although fusing folk with blues influences was common during the folk revival, particularly with Lead Belly and Josh White, Broonzy was arguably the most chronicled bluesman of the era. Asch and Smith had partaken in several projects with Broonzy, including albums and interviews, before he was forced to retire from music in early 1957, due to complications from throat cancer.

== Music ==
Trouble in Mind is largely culled from a recording session in New York produced by Asche and Smith; originally, Folkways released the studio work on the album Bill Broonzy Sings the Country Blues in 1957. The final two tracks were taped during a concert at Northwestern University. Spoken introductions and commentary were spliced together from interviews conducted by DJ Studs Terkel on the radio station WFMT. Aside from Pete Seeger on banjo for a live rendition of "This Train (Bound for Glory)", all the instrumentation is credited to Broonzy.

The majority of the original songs were written by Broonzy, who was also credited as musical arranger on some covers. On "Key to the Highway", he collaborated with piano player Charlie Segar, creating the melody while Sagar wrote most of the lyrics. Broonzy's willingness to address sensitive political issues are especially evident on "Joe Turner No. 2", "When Will I Get to Be Called Man", and "Black, Brown, and White Blues", topical songs that other record labels refused to release. Included on Trouble in Mind are renditions of traditional folk and blues compositions such as "Frankie and Johnny", "When Things Go Wrong (It Hurts Me Too)", and "C.C. Rider". These tracks, frequently played by Broonzy live, ensured that his albums would have instant appeal for white audiences in the manner of various country blues-based LPs that had resulted from the rediscovery of old-time blues artists.

== Release and reception ==
Smithsonian Folkways released Trouble in Mind on February 22, 2000; the label keeps the album in print. The album's liner notes were supplied by musicologist Jeff Place, who wrote detailed Broonzy's career and the songs complied on the album. Considering Trouble in Mind compiles recordings produced in the 1950s, the album is enhanced by higher sound quality, more so than most Smithsonian Folkways releases.

In his review for AllMusic, Richie Unterberger said of Trouble in Mind: "[Broonzy] was likely not in peak physical shape by this time, you wouldn't suspect that from the quality of the performances. His vocals are still rich and moving on a relaxed selection of originals and standards". PopMatters' reviewer Patrick Jones found the presentation of the album is encouraging "the listener to interact with the music, to learn about it, and to explore its link to history", and "is a rewarding and culturally enriching experience". Criticism from No Depression noted the novelty of Broonzy's Folkways material as a part of the vogue for "country-turned-urban blues singers as facsimiles of some idealized rural past"; however, it commended the historical significance of the album.

The Penguin Guide to Blues Recordings describes the album as “the best collection of [Broonzy’s] late-period music”, with “plenty of passion and zest”.

== Track listing ==
1. "Hey, Hey, Baby" - 2:51
2. "Frankie and Johnny" - 2:06
3. "Trouble in Mind" - 3:16
4. "Joe Turner No.2" - 5:13
5. "Mule-Ridin' Blues" - 3:42
6. "When Will I Get to Be Called a Man" - 2:17
7. "Poor Bill Blues" - 3:12
8. "Key to the Highway" - 2:32
9. "Plough-Hand Blues" - 3:24
10. "Digging My Potatoes" - 2:57
11. "When Things Go Wrong (It Hurts Me Too)" - 2:57
12. "C.C. Rider" - 2:32
13. "Saturday Evening Blues" - 3:32
14. "Shuffle Rag" - 2:04
15. "Southbound Train" - 4:48
16. "Hush, Somebody's Calling Me" - 3:58
17. "Louise" - 3:58
18. "Black, Brown and White" (spoken introduction) - 1:25
19. "Black, Brown and White Blues" - 2:41
20. "Willie Mae Blues" - 3:27
21. "This Train" (spoken introduction)" - 1:21
22. "This Train (Bound for Glory)" - 2:59
23. "In the Evening" (spoken introduction) - 1:05
24. "In the Evening When the Sun Goes Down" (introduction) - 4:22
