= I Come for to Sing =

I Come for to Sing was a folk music revue performed by Chicago musicians and singers Win Stracke, Big Bill Broonzy and Lawrence Lane. The program was narrated by Studs Terkel. I Come for to Sing ran successfully for more than ten years, touring colleges and clubs throughout the United States, with the bulk of the activity taking place in the Midwest. Most notably, the show ran for more than a year at the now defunct Chicago jazz club, The Blue Note.

In a 2007 article in the Chicago Tribune, Terkel remembered his years with I Come for to Sing,

In the late 1940s and early 50s, Win and I, plus Big Bill Broonzy and Larry Lane visited universities throughout the country. It was a program of folk songs with different epochs. Win sang frontier ballads, Big Bill sang a black man's blues and Larry Lane sang Elizabethan ballads. I was the narrator. It was received with great amazement and enthusiasm. We often crossed paths with Pete Seeger and The Weavers, who were of course, masters of the milieu.

Cast members rotated in and out over the years and included banjo player Fleming Brown, pianist Chet Roble and other performers who happened to be available, but the format of the show remained constant. The narrator set the tone for the evening by reading some prose or poetry or adding commentary, and the musicians reflected on that theme by performing folk songs from different musical traditions.

It is notable as the meeting place for the founders of the Old Town School of Folk Music. The Old Town School also published a folk magazine with the same name from 1975 to 1987.
