= Clement Richardson =

American academic administrator and author

President of Lincoln University
- In office 1918–1922
- Preceded by: Benjamin F. Allen
- Succeeded by: Inman E. Page

Personal details
- Born: 1878 Halifax County, Virginia, U.S.
- Died: December 1949 (aged 70–71)
- Spouse: Ida J. Rivers
- Children: 4
- Education: Mount Hermon School, Brown University
- Alma mater: Harvard University
- Occupation: Professor, university president, author, editor

Clement Richardson (1878 – December 1949) was an American professor, college president, and author. An African American, he served as president of Lincoln Institute in Jefferson City, Missouri from 1918 until 1922. He edited The National Cyclopedia of the Colored Race which includes a profile on him.

== Early life and education ==
Clement Richardson was born in 1878 in Halifax County, Virginia. He attended White Oak Grove Country School and tilled tobacco. He moved to Massachusetts for access to more education, initially working in tanning and farming, before attending the boys' school at Mount Hermon School (now Northfield Mount Hermon School).

For three years he attended Brown University, before transferring. Richardson graduated from Harvard University in 1907, one six African Americans graduating that year.

== Career ==
Richardson worked as a correspondent for many newspapers and magazines including The Boston Daily Globe; work that continued throughout his entire life.

He was the director of the department of English literature and rhetoric of Morehouse College in Atlanta in 1908. In 1908, Richardson joined the faculty of Tuskegee Institute (now Tuskegee University) as the head of the English department. He wrote a pamphlet titled "Extension Work" while at Tuskegee Institute.

From 1918 to 1922, Richardson served as the president of Lincoln Institute. Lincoln Institute became Lincoln University during his tenure as its president. In 1919, he was participant at a convention of African American educators in Jefferson City, many of the presentations were affiliated to the Negro Educational Congress. In 1919, he missed a Negro State Teachers event due to coal shortages at the school and in Missouri.

In 1922 he was to visit Richmond, Virginia.

== Clement Richardson Fine Arts Center and Auditorium ==
The Clement Richardson Fine Arts Center was building was constructed at Lincoln University in 1956. The auditorium / theater wing was under construction in 1958. The Arts Center has hosted events.

== Writings ==
- Richardson, Clement (June 12, 1915). "Notable Work of Southern School". The Denver Star. p. 4 – via Chronicling America.; about Tuskegee Institute's 34th year of existence
- Richardson, Clement (June 12, 1915). "Notable Work of Southern School". The Twin City Star. p. 1 – via Chronicling America.
- Richardson, Clement (July 1, 1916). "Tuskegee Makes Steady Advance". The Denver Star. p. 7 – via Chronicling America.; about commencement as Tuskegee Institute various related events
- Richardson, Clement (August 24, 1917). "Negro Farm Agents Doing Their Share to Win the War". The Nashville Globe. p. 3 – via Chronicling America.
- The National Cyclopedia of the Colored Race, editor

== Personal life ==
Richardson was married in 1908 to Ida J. Rivers, and had four daughters. He died in December 1949.

== See also ==
- Inman E. Page, the first African American to serve as president of Lincoln Institute
