= Valucha deCastro =

- Born: October 9, 1930
- Origin: Brazil
- Died: February 12, 2007 (aged 76)
- Genres: Folk, Brazilian music
- Occupations: Singer, songwriter, music teacher
- Instruments: Vocals, guitar
- Years active: 1962–2007
- Formerly of: Laura de Lisse

Valucha deCastro (October 9, 1930 – February 12, 2007) was a Brazilian-born singer, songwriter and artist. Born in Brazil's Minas Gerais state, she grew up in Rio de Janeiro. She was one of the first students of Chicago, Illinois's Old Town School of Folk Music and later a teacher of Brazilian folk music there. She recorded an album with the Old Town School's Frank Hamilton titled "The World of Frank & Valucha" in 1962.

During the 1970s she toured the United States performing Brazilian folk music and in the 1980s, she collaborated with musician/arranger Sergio Bezard who arranged and produced her album "Batuki" and "Trio Rio" with Laura de Lisse on guitar. By the end of the decade, they had become the top Brazilian group in Chicago's music world.

Later in her life she became a painter, living in Russia and China. She died at her home in Washington, D.C. of liver disease in 2007.
