= Antoinette Candia-Bailey =

American academic administrator (1974–2024)

- Born: March 12, 1974; Chicago, Illinois, U.S.
- Died: January 8, 2024 (aged 49); Plainfield, Illinois, U.S.
- Cause of death: Suicide

Academic background
- Education: Lincoln University (BS); Michigan State University (MA); North Carolina A&T State University (PhD)

Academic work
- Discipline: Academic administration
- Institutions: University of Wisconsin–Madison; Elms College; Lincoln University

Antoinette "Bonnie" Candia-Bailey (March 12, 1974 – January 8, 2024) was an American academic administrator who served as the vice president for student affairs at Lincoln University of Missouri (a historically black college) in 2023. After she died by suicide early the next year, a national discussion on the treatment of black women in higher education took place.

== Life ==
Candia-Bailey was born to Veronica Joyce Candia and Robert Bonner in Chicago.

She completed a B.S. in sociology at Lincoln University in 1998. She joined Alpha Kappa Alpha in November 1995. She earned an M.A. in rehabilitation counseling-disability studies from Michigan State University in 2001. Candia-Bailey completed a Ph.D. in leadership studies from North Carolina A&T State University in 2016. Her dissertation was titled, My Sister, Myself: The Identification of Sociocultural Factors that Affect the Advancement of African-American Women into Senior-Level Administrative Positions.

Candia-Bailey was the assistant director of university housing at North Carolina State University. She served as the director of academic excellence at North Carolina A&T State University. She was the assistant vice president of student affairs-housing and residence life at Towson University. At the University of Wisconsin–Madison, she was the associate dean of students and student life. Later she served as the senior project coordinator to the deputy vice chancellor for diversity and inclusion. On April 1, 2020, Candia-Bailey became the first vice president of student affairs and chief diversity officer at Elms College.

On May 1, 2023, Candia-Bailey returned to her alma mater, Lincoln University, as its vice president for student affairs. She received a termination letter on January 3, 2024. The letter stated she was terminated for cause and made "allegations of insubordination in allowing an ineligible student to work, allowing ineligible students to obtain a discounted housing rate and failing to adhere to confidentiality requirements in a grievance matter filed by two of her subordinates".

== Personal life ==
Candia-Bailey had married Anthony R. Bailey on January 28, 2012, in Greensboro, North Carolina. She had two stepdaughters.

=== Death ===
On January 8, 2024, she sent an email to Lincoln University's president, John B. Moseley, alleging that he had subjected her to months of harassment, bullying, and racial discrimination. She died by suicide the same day, at the age of 49. Her death prompted protests on campus and a national discussion on the treatment of Black women in higher education. Moseley was later cleared by an internal investigative board of any wrongdoing or misconduct and was not linked to the suicide. He returned to his duties at the university. The university was also cleared of any allegation of mistreatment.
