= Lincoln University (Missouri) =

University in Jefferson City, Missouri, U.S.

- Former names: Lincoln Institute (1866–1921)
- Motto: Laborare et studere
- Motto in English: To labor and study
- Type: Public historically black land-grant university
- Established: January 14, 1866
- Academic affiliations: Space-grant
- President: Dr. John B. Moseley
- Students: 1,799 (Fall 2023)
- Undergraduates: 1,730 (Fall 2022)
- Postgraduates: 103 (Fall 2022)
- Location: Jefferson City, Missouri, United States; 38.565°N 92.169°W
- Campus: Suburban, 167 acres (67.6 ha) (Main campus), 374.68 acres (151.628 ha) (University Farms)
- Colors: Navy blue and white
- Nickname: Blue Tigers
- Sporting affiliations: NCAA Division II – The MIAA
- Mascot: Stripes
- Website: lincolnu.edu

Lincoln University (Lincoln U) is a public, historically black, land-grant university in Jefferson City, Missouri, United States. Founded in 1866 by African-American veterans of the American Civil War, it is a member-school of the Thurgood Marshall College Fund. This was the first black university in the state. In the fall 2023, the university enrolled 1,799 students.

== History ==
- Lincoln University Hilltop Campus Historic District
- U.S. National Register of Historic Places
- U.S. Historic district
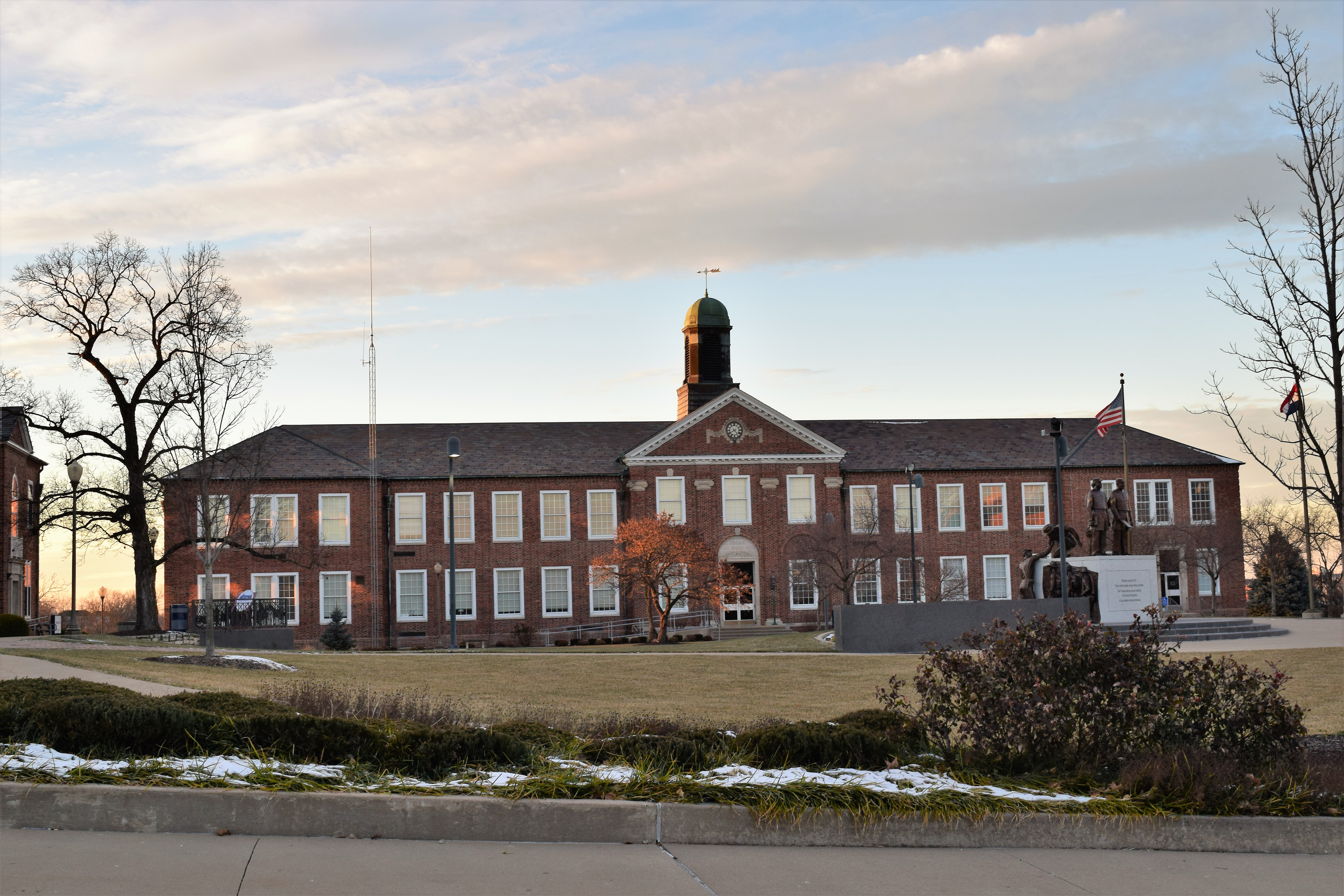
- Young Hall

- Location within Missouri Location within the United States
- Location: 820 Chestnut St., Jefferson City, Missouri
- Area: 9.6 acres (3.9 ha)
- Built: 1923
- Architectural style: Colonial Revival
- NRHP reference No.: 83000978
- Added to NRHP: April 28, 1983

During the Civil War, the 62nd Colored Infantry regiment of the U.S. Army, largely recruited in Missouri, set up educational programs for its soldiers. At the end of the war it raised $6,300 to set up a black school, headed by a white abolitionist officer, Richard Foster, and founded by James Milton Turner, a student and protege of John Berry Meachum.

Foster opened the Lincoln Institute in Jefferson City in 1866. Lincoln had a black student body, both black and white teachers, and outside support from religious groups. The state government provided $5,000 a year to train teachers for the state's new public school system for blacks, including mostly formerly enslaved men and women.

Under the Morrill Act of 1890, Missouri designated the school a land-grant university, emphasizing agriculture, mechanics and teaching. This provision helped to establish funding for its operations.

By 1921, the college had expanded to offer graduate programs. It was officially designated a university by the state of Missouri. It changed its name to Lincoln University of Missouri. In 1954, it opened its doors to applicants of all ethnicities. It provides both undergraduate and graduate courses.

On May 22, 2019, Jefferson City was hit by an EF3 tornado, causing significant damage to the historic President's Residence near the campus.

In May 2021, Lincoln University President Jerald Woolfolk announced her plans to step down at the end of that school year.

In 2024, Lincoln University alumni called for president John B. Moseley to step down following the suicide of vice-president Antoinette Candia-Bailey. She had complained of harassment and unfair treatment by him. In the ensuing months, an independent investigation was carried out by the University's Board of Curators. President of the Board of Curators, Victor B. Pasley, stated "during this exhaustive, independent investigation, no evidence was found that Dr. Moseley bullied Dr. Candia-Bailey." After two months of voluntary leave, Moseley was reinstated as President of Lincoln University of Missouri. Sherman Bonds, president of the Lincoln University Alumni Association, issued a statement questioning the investigation's findings and accusing the board of causing "irrevocable harm, shame, hopelessness, and mortification to our beloved University."

=== Presidents ===
- Richard Baxter Foster (1866 to 1870)
- W. B. Payne (1870 to 1871)
- Samuel T. Mitchell (1875 to 1878)
- Inman E. Page (1880 to 1898)
- John H. Jackson (1898 to 1901)
- Edward E. Clarke (1902)
- Benjamin F. Allen (1902 to 1918)
- Clement Richardson (1918 to 1922)
- Inman E. Page (1922 to 1923)
- Nathan B. Young (1923 to 1927)
- William B. Jason (1927 to 1929)
- Nathan B. Young (1929 to 1931)
- Charles W. Florence (1931 to 1937)
- William B. Jason (1937 to 1938)
- Sherman D. Scruggs (1938 to 1956)
- Earl Edgar Dawson (1956 to 1969)
- Walter C. Daniel (1969 to 1972)
- James Frank (1973 to 1982)
- Thomas Miller Jenkins (1984 to 1986)
- Wendell G. Rayburn (1988 to 1996)
- David B. Henson (1997 to 2005)
- Carolyn Mahoney (2005 to 2012)
- Kevin D. Rome, Sr. (2013 to 2017)
- Jerald Jones Woolfolk (2018 to 2021)
- John B. Moseley (2022 to present)

== Athletics ==
The Lincoln University athletic teams are called the Blue Tigers. The university is a member of the NCAA Division II ranks, primarily competing in the Great Lakes Valley Conference (GLVC) since the 2024–25 academic year. The Blue Tigers previously competed in the Mid-America Intercollegiate Athletics Association (MIAA) from 2010–11 to 2023–24 (which they were a member on a previous stint from 1970–71 to 1998–99, but later left because it had not had a football team since after the 1989 fall season), as well as the Heartland Conference, of which it was a founding conference member, from 1999–2000 to 2009–10.

Lincoln competes in twelve intercollegiate varsity sports: Men's sports include baseball, basketball, football, golf, soccer, and track & field; while women's sports include basketball, cross country, golf, soccer, softball and track & field.

The school revitalized its football program and re-entered the MIAA in 2010. The Lincoln University Women's Track Team made NCAA Division II history by winning the Outdoor Track and Field Championships five consecutive times.

=== Alma Mater "Lincoln, O, Lincoln" ===
The alma mater is sung to the tune of "Ach wie ist's möglich dann", a German folk song published in 1827 and variously credited to Georg Heinrich or Friedrich Silcher Kuchen (the West Point and Wake Forest alma mater songs use the same melody).

== Student activities ==
Undergraduate demographics as of Fall 2023
Race and ethnicity	Total
Black	53%
White	28%
International student	7%
Hispanic	4%
Two or more races	4%
Unknown	3%
Asian	1%
Economic diversity
Low-income (Note: The percentage of students who received an income-based federal Pell grant intended for low-income students.)	56%
Affluent (Note: The percentage of students who are a part of the American middle class at the bare minimum.)	44%

Founder's Day, traditionally held on the first Saturday of February, pays tribute to the founders of Lincoln University. Homecoming, usually held in October, is a celebratory time when family and friends of Lincoln University convene to participate in gala activities. Springfest, usually held in late April, celebrates the arrival of spring with games and other activities throughout the week.

=== Marching Musical Storm ===
The "Marching Musical Storm" is the university's marching band. It was founded in 1948 and is one of the largest student organizations on campus. The band performs at all home football games, select basketball games, and other school-sanctioned functions throughout the year.

=== Student media ===
- The Clarion (university newspaper)
- KJLU (radio station)
- JCTV (Public-access television)

== Notable faculty and staff ==
- Alan T. Busby (1895–1992), first African American alumnus of the University of Connecticut in 1918.
- Antoinette Candia-Bailey (1974–2024), vice president of student affairs at Lincoln University
- Joseph Carter Corbin (1833–1911), first principal of University of Arkansas at Pine Bluff
- Charles Edgar Dickinson Jr. (1908–1964), landscape architect and educator; first Black member of the American Society of Landscape Architects.
- Myrtle Craig Mowbray (1883–1974), first African-American woman to graduate from Michigan State University in 1907
- Oliver Cromwell Cox (1901–1974), member of the Chicago School of Sociology and early world-systems theorist who taught at Lincoln (1949–1970)
- Robert Nathaniel Dett (1882–1943), classical composer
- Sumner Alexander Furniss (1874–1953), first Black doctor at Indiana City Hospital, politician, activist, and freemason
- Althea Gibson (1927–2003), black tennis pioneer, Wimbledon, French Open, and US Open champion; athletics instructor in the early 1950s
- Lorenzo Greene (1899–1988), historian who taught at Lincoln University (1933–1972)
- Eugene Haynes (1927–2007), Artist in Residence at Lincoln University (1958–1974)
- Armistead S. Pride (1907–1991), journalist and head of Lincoln's journalism department from 1943 to 1976
- W. Sherman Savage (1890–1981), professor of history at Lincoln from 1929 to 1960
- Josephine Silone Yates (1859–1912), professor and head of Lincoln's natural science department, first Black woman to hold a full professorship or head a science department in the U.S.

== Notable alumni ==
- Antoinette Candia-Bailey (1974–2024), academic administrator
- Maida Coleman (born 1954), senate minority leader in Missouri
- Oleta Crain (1913–2007), advocate for black women's rights and desegregation
- William Stanford Davis (born 1951), actor Abbott Elementary (2021–present)
- Rita Heard Days (born 1950), member of both houses of the Missouri State Legislature
- Lloyd L. Gaines (born 1911 – disappeared 1939), disappeared mysteriously after fighting for the right to equal education
- Dorothy Butler Gilliam (born 1936), first African-American female reporter at The Washington Post, co-founder of the National Association of Black Journalists.
- Exie Lee Hampton (1893–1979), active in YWCA, NAACP, Urban League, and settlement work in southern California
- Julius Hemphill (1938–1995), jazz musician
- George Howard, Jr. (1924–2007), first African-American federal judge in Arkansas
- Ann Walton Kroenke (born 1948), Walmart heiress and sports team owner, nursing degree
- Oliver Lake (born 1942), jazz musician
- Leo Lewis (1933–2013), member of the Canadian Football Hall of Fame
- Blaine Luetkemeyer (born 1952), U.S. Congressman
- Anderson Delano Macklin (1933–2001), American artist, educator
- Carey Means (born 1966), voice of Frylock on Aqua Teen Hunger Force
- Zeke Moore (born 1943), football player, former NFL defensive back
- John Collins Muhammad (born 1991), City of St. Louis alderman and Ferguson activist
- Lemar Parrish (born 1947), football player, former eight-time Pro Bowl National Football League (NFL) defensive back in the 1970s and early 1980s, and former head coach of the Blue Tiger football team from 2004 to 2009
- Joshua Peters (2009), one of the youngest members of the Missouri State House of Representatives, and a former SGA president
- Wendell O. Pruitt (1920–1945), a fighter pilot with the famed 332nd Fighter Group (the Tuskegee Airmen)
- Romona Robinson (born 1969), award-winning Cleveland television news presenter
- Ted Savage, Major League Baseball Player for multiple teams from 1962 to 1971, Lincoln University Alumni Hall of Fame
- U.S. Grant Tayes (1885–1972) class of 1936; painter, educator, barber, columnist, and musician
- Moddie Taylor (1912–1976), African-American chemist who worked on the Manhattan Project and became the head of Howard University's Chemistry Department from 1969 to 1976
- Joe Torry, actor and comedian
- Taylor Townsend, tennis player
- Ronald Townson (1933–2001), vocalist, who was an original member of The 5th Dimension, a popular vocal group of the late 1960s and early 1970s
- Leroy Tyus (1916–1998), American politician, real estate developer, and state legislator in Missouri
- William Tecumseh Vernon (1871–1944), Bishop of the African Methodist Episcopal Church, and a former president of Western University
- A. Wilberforce Williams (1865–1940), American doctor and journalist; attended the normal school associated with Lincoln Institute
