= Lincoln Cemetery (Cook County) =

Historically African American cemetery in Cook County, Illinois, US

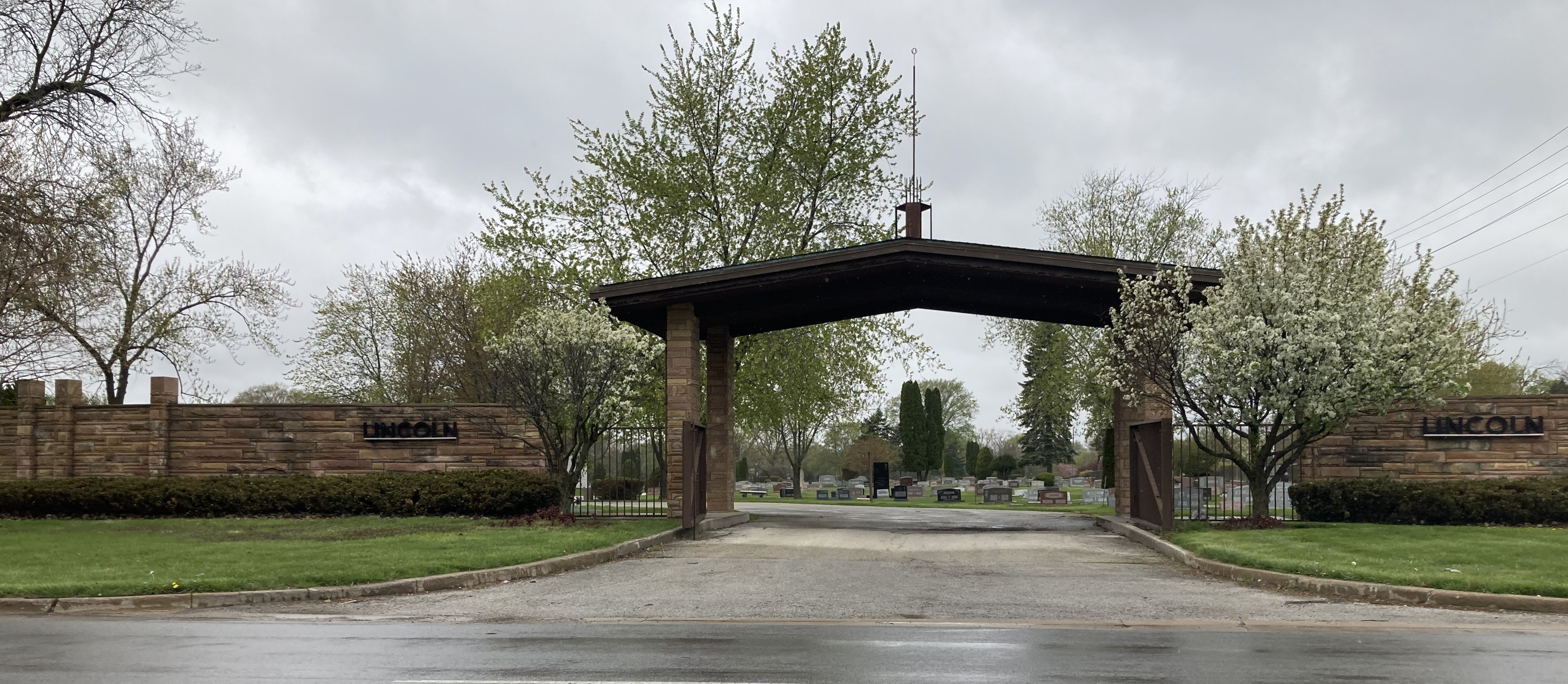
- Interactive map of Lincoln Cemetery

Details
- Established: 1911
- Location: Cook County, Illinois
- Country: United States
- Coordinates: 41°40′12″N 87°42′09″W
- Owned by: Dignity Memorial
- Size: 112 acres (45 ha)
- No. of interments: over 16,000
- Website: Lincoln Cemetery
- Find a Grave: Lincoln Cemetery

Lincoln Cemetery is a historically African American cemetery in Blue Island, Illinois, United States. Near Chicago, the cemetery is about 112 acres (45 ha) with over 16,000 interments.

== History ==
Founded in 1911 by local Black business leaders, the cemetery is next to the Oak Hill Cemetery, and Beverly Cemetery (all three cemeteries are now managed by the same company).

The cemetery is noteworthy for the number of famous African-American Chicagoans buried there, among them several notable blues and jazz musicians, as well as notables in literature, sports, and history.

== Notable graves ==
- Robert Sengstacke Abbott (1870–1940), newspaper publisher
- Joshua Altheimer (1910–1940), blues pianist
- Albert Ammons (1907–1949), jazz and boogie-woogie pianist
- Gene Ammons (1925–1974), jazz tenor saxophonist (son of Albert Ammons)
- Lillian Hardin Armstrong (1898–1971), jazz singer and pianist and the second wife of Louis Armstrong (Garden of Peace Mausoleum)
- Charles Avery (1892–1974), blues and boogie-woogie pianist
- Jimmy Blythe (1901–1931), jazz and boogie-woogie pianist and composer
- Big Bill Broonzy (1893–1958), blues musician
- Gwendolyn Brooks (1917–2000), poet, first African American to win a Pulitzer Prize
- James Albert Bray (1870–1944), bishop, academic administrator and college president
- Bessie Coleman (1892–1926), first African-American woman aviator
- Johnny Dodds (1892–1940), jazz clarinetist
- Warren "Baby" Dodds (1898–1959), jazz drummer
- Charles "Pat" Dougherty (1879–1939), baseball pitcher in the pre-Negro leagues
- Andrew Rube Foster (1879–1930), baseball player, manager, and executive in the Negro leagues. "The father of black baseball"
- William "Bill" Francis (1879–1942), third baseman and manager in the Negro leagues
- King Daniel Ganaway (d. 1944), photographer
- Octavius Granady (1872–1928), committeeman in the "Bloody 20th Ward", killed by the mobster Morris Elder
- Emma Griffin (1877–1918), vaudeville performer and entrepreneur
- Vivian Harsh (1890–1960), first African American librarian in the Chicago Public Library, created a monumental research collection on black life.
- Al Hibbler (1915–2001), American baritone vocalist
- Papa Charlie Jackson (1887–1938), blues singer, songster and banjoist and guitarist
- Tom "College Boy" Johnson (1889–1926), baseball pitcher in the Negro leagues
- Lafayette Leake (1919–1990), blues and jazz musician
- Frank Leland (1869–1914), baseball player, manager, and executive in the pre-Negro leagues
- Rodney Long (1843–1907), Civil War veteran; sergeant in the 29th United States Colored Infantry and one of the earliest African American police detectives in Chicago
- Lillian C. Moseley (1905–2007), Bronzeville socialite, worked for notables on both sides of the law: Al Capone, Attorney Roy Washington, The Honorable Harold Washington, first African American Mayor of Chicago and the Honorable Judge Abraham Lincoln Marovitz
- Florence Beatrice Price (1887–1953), classical composer, pianist, organist and music teacher. First African-American woman to have a composition played by a major orchestra
- Marian Robinson (1937–2024), mother of Michelle Obama
- Jimmy Reed (1925–1976), blues musician
- Elder Lucy Smith (1875–1952), first woman to pastor a major Chicago congregation, early radio evangelist
- Casey Bill Weldon (1901 or 1909–1972), country blues musician
- Blanche Wilkins Williams (1876–1936), educator of deaf children
- A. Wilberforce Williams (1865–1940), African American physician, teacher and journalist
- Jesse Ernest Wilkins Sr. (1894–1959), Undersecretary of Labor in the Eisenhower administration
- Ella (Wilson) Wright (1884–1959) schoolteacher and mother of writer Richard Wright 1908–1960
- At least 14 victims of the Chicago race riot of 1919, including murdered teenager Eugene Williams, whose homicide was a catalyst for the riot
