= Big Bill Broonzy =

American blues singer, songwriter and guitarist

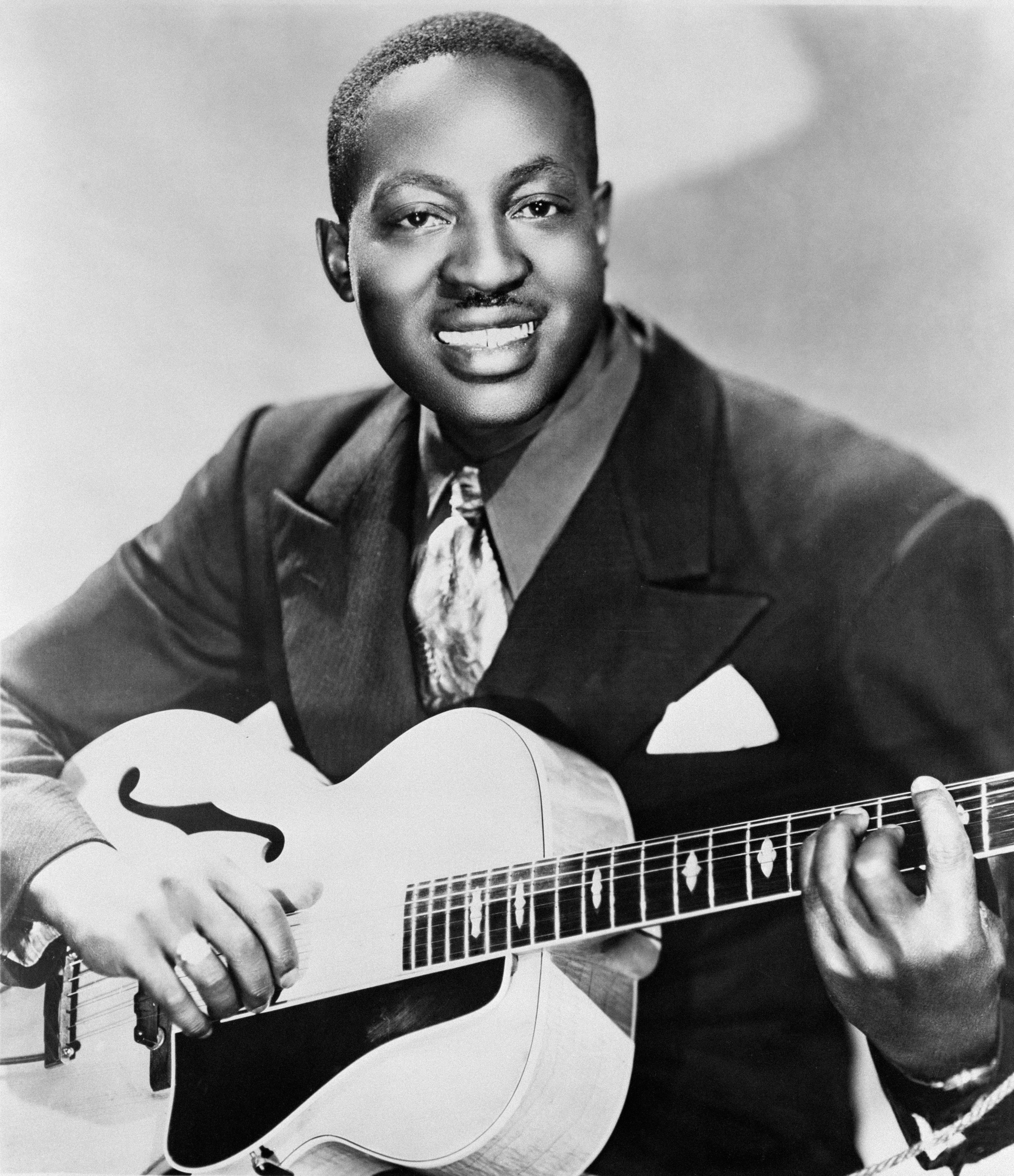
- Broonzy with a Gibson L-7 guitar in 1951

Background information
- Also known as: William L. Broonzy, Willie Broonzy, Big Bill Broonzy, Big Bill Broomsley
- Born: Lee Conley Bradley; June 26, 1893 or 1903; Lake Dick, Arkansas or Scott, Mississippi, U.S.
- Died: August 15, 1958 (55 or 65) Chicago, Illinois, U.S.
- Genre: Blues
- Occupations: Musician, songwriter
- Instruments: Vocals, guitar
- Years active: 1927–1958
- Labels: Paramount; Bluebird; Vocalion; Folkways
- Spouse: Rose Lawson

Big Bill Broonzy (born Lee Conley Bradley; June 26, 1893 or 1903 – August 14, 1958), later known as William Lee Broonzy, was an American blues singer, songwriter, and guitarist. His career began in the 1920s, when he played country music to mostly African-American audiences. In the 1930s and 1940s, he navigated a change in style to a more urban blues sound popular with working-class black audiences. In the 1950s, a return to his traditional folk-blues roots made him one of the leading figures of the emerging American folk music revival and an international star. His long and varied career marks him as one of the key figures in the development of blues music in the 20th century.

Broonzy copyrighted more than 300 songs, including adaptations of traditional folk songs and original blues songs. As a blues composer, he was unique in writing songs that reflected his rural-to-urban experiences.

== Life and career ==
=== Early years ===
Reportedly born Lee Conley Bradley, he was one of 17 children born to Frank Broonzy (Bradley) and Mittie Belcher. The year and place of his birth are disputed. Broonzy claimed to have been born in Scott, Mississippi but a body of emerging research compiled by the blues historian Robert Reisman suggests that he was born in Jefferson County, Arkansas. Broonzy claimed he was born in 1893, which is confirmed by a February 1957 travel manifest (UK and Ireland, Incoming Passenger Lists, 1878-1960), which gives his name as William L Broonzy, his age as 63, his date of birth as 26 June 1893 (Official Number 9511/10) and many sources report that year. However, family records discovered after his death suggested that the year may have been 1903.

Soon after his birth, the family moved to an area called Lake Dick, Arkansas, near Pine Bluff, Arkansas, where Bill spent his youth. He began playing music at an early age. At the age of 10 he made himself a fiddle from a cigar box and learned how to play spirituals and folk songs from his uncle, Jerry Belcher. He and a friend, Louis Carter, who played a homemade guitar, began performing at social and church functions. These early performances included playing at "two-way": picnics where whites and blacks danced at the same event, but with different stages for blacks and whites.

On the understanding that he was born in 1898 rather than earlier or later, sources suggest that in 1915, 17-year-old Broonzy was married and working as a sharecropper. He had given up playing the fiddle and had become a preacher. There is a story that he was offered $50 and a new violin if he would play for four days at a local venue. Before he could respond to the offer, his wife took the money and spent it, so he had to play.

It has been previously stated that in 1916 his crop and stock were wiped out by drought and he went to work locally until he was drafted into the Army in 1917, that he served for two years in Europe during the First World War and that after his discharge from the Army in 1919, he left Pine Bluff and moved to the Little Rock area. However, biographer Bob Riesman, after examining Broonzy's family records, census records and local draft cards, concluded that Broonzy was only 14 in 1917 when the U.S. entered WWI and that Broonzy never actually served in the Army during World War I. In 1920, Broonzy moved north to Chicago in search of opportunity.

=== 1920s ===
After arriving in Chicago, Broonzy switched from fiddle to guitar. He learned to play the guitar from the veteran minstrel and medicine show performer Papa Charlie Jackson, who began recording for Paramount Records in 1924. Through the 1920s Broonzy worked at a string of odd jobs, including Pullman porter, cook, foundry worker and custodian, to supplement his income, but his main interest was music. He played regularly at rent parties and social gatherings, steadily improving his guitar playing. During this time he wrote one of his signature tunes, a solo guitar piece called "Saturday Night Rub".

Thanks to his association with Jackson, Broonzy was able to get an audition with Paramount executive J. Mayo Williams. His initial test recordings, made with his friend John Thomas on vocals, were rejected, but Broonzy persisted, and his second try, a few months later, was more successful. His first record, "House Rent Stomp", backed with "Big Bill Blues", credited to Big Bill and Thomps (Paramount 12656), was released in 1927. Although the recording was not well received, Paramount retained its new talent and in the next few years released more records by Big Bill and Thomas. The records sold poorly. Reviewers considered his style immature and derivative.

=== 1930s ===
In 1930, Paramount, for the first time, used Broonzy's full name on a recording, "Station Blues" – albeit misspelled as "Big Bill Broomsley". Record sales continued to be poor, and Broonzy was working at a grocery store. He was picked up by Lester Melrose, who produced musical acts for various labels, including the Richmond, Indiana-based Champion Records and Gennett Records. Harum Scarums, a trio composed of Broonzy, Thomas "Georgia Tom" Dorsey, and Mozelle Alderson, recorded the two-part "Alabama Scratch" in Grafton, Wisconsin, for Paramount Records (Paramount 13054) in January 1931, and it was reported that it sounded "as if it was a real party". Broonzy recorded several sides released in the spring of 1931 under the name Big Bill Johnson. In March 1932, he traveled to New York City and began recording for the American Record Corporation on their line of less expensive labels (Melotone Records, Perfect Records and others). These recordings sold better, and Broonzy was becoming better known. Back in Chicago he was working regularly in South Side clubs, and he toured with Memphis Minnie.

In 1934 Broonzy moved to RCA Victor's subsidiary Bluebird Records and began recording with the pianist known as "Black Bob." With Black Bob his music was evolving to a stronger R&B sound, and his singing sounded more assured and personal. In 1937, he began playing with the pianist Joshua Altheimer, recording and performing with a small instrumental group, including "traps" (drums), double bass and one or more melody instruments (horns or harmonica or both). In March 1938 he began recording for Vocalion Records.

Broonzy's reputation grew. In 1938 he was asked to fill in for the recently deceased Robert Johnson at the "From Spirituals to Swing" concert at Carnegie Hall, produced by John H. Hammond. He also appeared in the 1939 concert at the same venue. His success led him in the same year to a small role in Swingin' the Dream, Gilbert Seldes's jazz adaptation of Shakespeare's Midsummer Night's Dream, set in New Orleans in 1890 and featuring, among others, Louis Armstrong as Bottom and Maxine Sullivan as Titania, with the Benny Goodman sextet.

Broonzy's recorded output through the 1930s only partially reflects his importance to Chicago blues. His half-brother, Washboard Sam, and his friends Jazz Gillum and Tampa Red, also recorded for Bluebird. Broonzy was credited as the composer of many of their most popular recordings of that time. He reportedly played guitar on most of Washboard Sam's tracks. Because of his exclusive arrangements with his record label, Broonzy was careful to allow his name to appear on these artists' records only as a composer.

=== 1940s ===
Broonzy expanded his work during the 1940s as he honed his songwriting skills, which showed a knack for appealing to his more sophisticated city audience as well as people that shared his country roots. His work in this period shows he performed across a wider musical spectrum than almost any other bluesman before or since, including in his repertoire ragtime, hokum, country blues, urban blues, jazz-tinged songs, folk songs and spirituals. After World War II, Broonzy recorded songs that were the bridge that allowed many younger musicians to cross over to the future of the blues: the electric blues of postwar Chicago. His 1945 recordings of "Where the Blues Began", with Big Maceo on piano and Buster Bennett on sax, and "Martha Blues", with Memphis Slim on piano, clearly showed the way forward. One of his best-known songs, "Key to the Highway", appeared at this time. When the second American Federation of Musicians strike ended in 1948, Broonzy was signed by Mercury Records.

In 1949, Broonzy became part of a touring folk music revue, I Come for to Sing, formed by Win Stracke, which also included Studs Terkel and Lawrence Lane. Terkel called him the key figure in the group. The revue had some success thanks to the emerging folk revival. When the revue played at Iowa State University in Ames, Broonzy met a local couple, Leonard and Lillian Feinberg, who found him a custodial job at Iowa State when a doctor ordered Broonzy to discontinue touring later that year. He remained in Ames until 1951, when he resumed touring.

=== 1950s ===
EP cover (Melodisc EPM7-65), released in the UK in 1956, with an advertisement for Broonzy's autobiography, Big Bill Blues

Broonzy left Chicago in 1950 to work as a janitor at Iowa State, having performed there and established relationships with a likely view to develop his own influence and craft. After his return to performing, the exposure from I Come for to Sing made it possible for him to tour Europe in 1951. Here Broonzy was greeted with standing ovations and critical praise wherever he played. The tour marked a turning point in his fortunes, and when he returned to the United States he was a featured act with many prominent folk artists, such as Pete Seeger, and Sonny Terry and Brownie McGhee. From 1953 on, Broonzy's financial position became more secure, and he was able to live well on his earnings from music. He returned to his solo folk-blues roots and travelled and recorded extensively.

His numerous performances during the 1950s in British folk and jazz clubs were a significant influence on British audiences' understanding of the blues and bolstered the nascent British folk revival and early blues scene. Many British musicians on the folk scene, such as Bert Jansch, cited him as an important influence. John Lennon and Paul McCartney, of the Beatles, also cited Broonzy as an important early influence.

In 1953, Vera (King) Morkovin and Studs Terkel took Broonzy to Circle Pines Center, a cooperative year-round camp in Delton, Michigan, where he was employed as the summer camp cook. He worked there in the summer from 1953 to 1956. On July 4, 1954, Pete Seeger travelled to Circle Pines and gave a concert with Broonzy on the farmhouse lawn, which was recorded by Seeger for the new fine-arts radio station in Chicago, WFMT-FM.

In 1955, with the assistance of the Belgian writer Yannick Bruynoghe, Broonzy published his autobiography, Big Bill Blues. He toured worldwide, traveling to Africa, South America, the Pacific region, and across Europe into early 1956. In 1957 Broonzy was one of the founding faculty members of the Old Town School of Folk Music. On the school's opening night, December 1, he taught a class called "The Glory of Love".

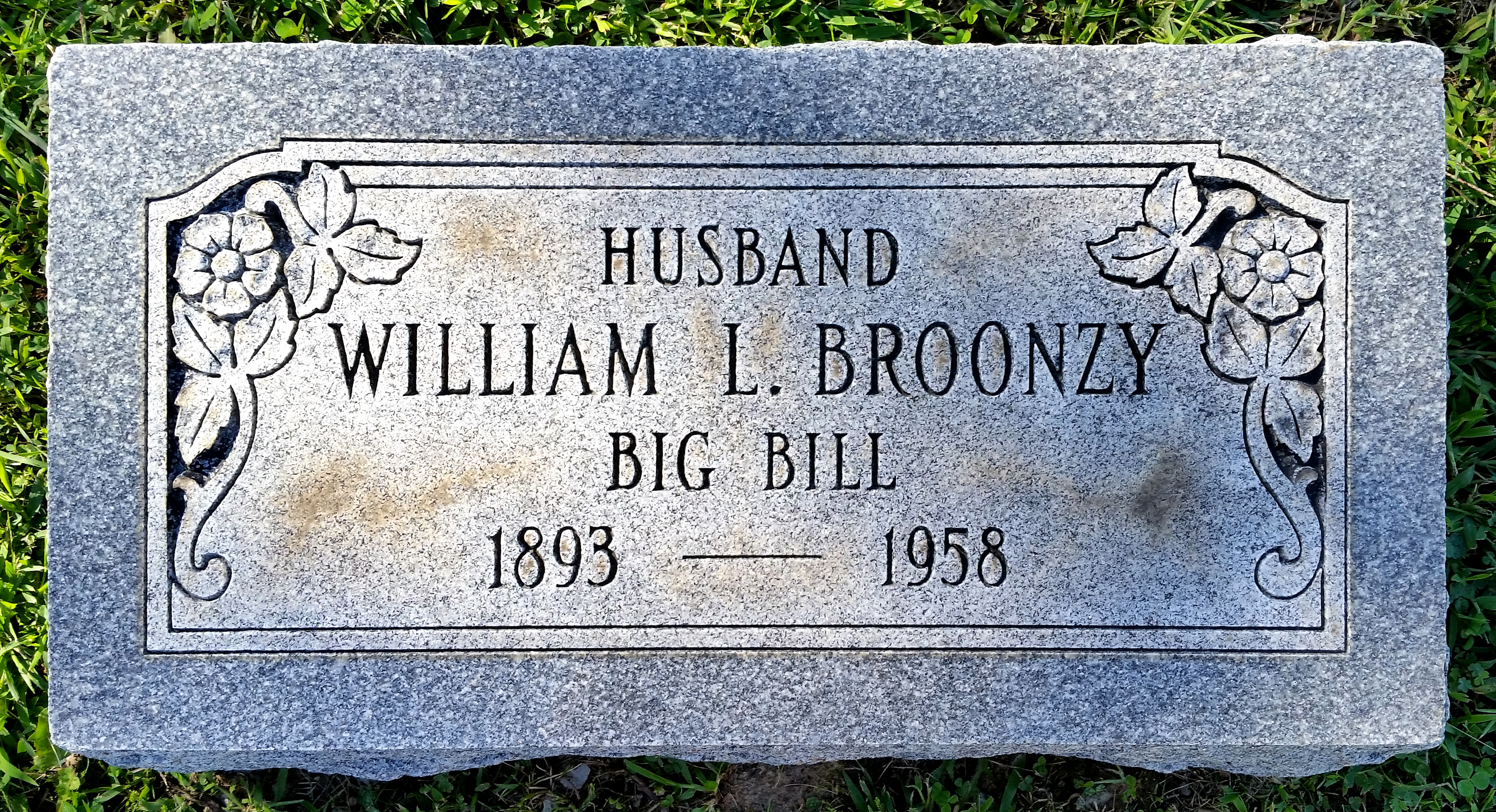
Big Bill Broonzy's gravestone located at Lincoln Cemetery in Blue Island, Illinois

=== Illness and death ===
In the late 1940s, Big Bill Broonzy's doctor warned him that 20 years of constant traveling and living the lifestyle of an "itinerant musician" would have dangerous effects on his aging body and health. In June 1956, Broonzy began to feel "frazzled", explaining to Pim Van Isveldt that "his nerves might be bad". From 1956 to 1957, as he was performing his last tour in Europe, Broonzy's condition worsened, and he was subsequently diagnosed with cancer in July 1957. Broonzy made his last recordings in Chicago from July 12 to 14, 1957.

In September 1957, Broonzy wrote to Van Isveldt that he recently underwent surgery that removed one of his lungs. Broonzy tried to convince her that he would return to London, but he never toured Europe again. A second surgery that took place in the fall of 1957 ended up severing his vocal cords, and although another operation was planned in the early winter of 1958, in hopes of repairing his damaged vocal cords, Broonzy never performed again.

By 1958, Broonzy was suffering from throat cancer. A benefit concert was organized to assist Broonzy with his medical debt, and the concert ended up raising approximately $2,000. After the two-and-a-half hour performance, Broonzy reportedly stood on stage to thunderous applause, thanking his friends and colleagues for "making the evening so memorable".

On August 15, 1958, Broonzy died in an ambulance from cancer as he was being rushed to Billings Hospital from his home at 4716 South Park Way. His funeral was held on August 19, and he was buried in Lincoln Cemetery, in Blue Island, Illinois.

== Style and influence ==
Broonzy's influences included the folk music, spirituals, work songs, ragtime music, hokum and country blues he heard growing up and the styles of his contemporaries, including Jimmie Rodgers, Blind Blake, Son House, and Blind Lemon Jefferson. He combined all these influences into his own style of the blues, which foreshadowed the postwar Chicago blues, later refined and popularized by artists such as Muddy Waters and Willie Dixon.

Although he had been a pioneer of the Chicago blues style and had employed electric instruments as early as 1942, white audiences in the 1950s wanted to hear him playing his earlier songs accompanied only by his own acoustic guitar, which they considered to be more authentic. He portrayed the discrimination against black Americans in his song "Black, Brown and White".

The song has been used globally in education about racism, but in the late 1990s its inclusion in antiracism education at a school in Greater Manchester, England, led pupils to taunt the school's only black pupil with the song's chorus, "If you're white, that's all right, if you're brown, stick around, but if you're black, oh brother get back, get back, get back". The national media reported that the problem became so bad that the nine-year-old boy was withdrawn from the school by his mother.

A considerable part of Broonzy's early ARC/CBS recordings has been reissued in anthologies by CBS-Sony, and other earlier recordings have been collected on blues reissue labels, as have his European and Chicago recordings of the 1950s. The Smithsonian's Folkways Records has also released several albums featuring Broonzy. In 1980, he was inducted into the first class of the Blues Hall of Fame, along with 20 other of the world's greatest blues legends. In 2007, he was inducted into the first class of the Gennett Records Walk of Fame, along with 11 other musical greats, including Louis Armstrong, Jelly Roll Morton, Gene Autry, and Lawrence Welk.

As an acoustic guitar player, Broonzy inspired Muddy Waters, Memphis Slim, Ray Davies, John Renbourn, Rory Gallagher, and Steve Howe. In the September 2007 issue of Q Magazine, Ronnie Wood, of the Rolling Stones, cited Broonzy's track "Guitar Shuffle" as his favorite guitar music. Wood remarked: "It was one of the first tracks I learnt to play, but even to this day I can't play it exactly right." Eric Clapton has cited Broonzy as a major inspiration, commenting that Broonzy "became like a role model for me, in terms of how to play the acoustic guitar".

Clapton featured Broonzy's song "Hey Hey" on his album Unplugged. The Derek and the Dominos album Layla and Other Assorted Love Songs includes their recording of "Key to the Highway". Tom Jones has cited Broonzy as a major influence on him and in a 2012 interview described his first experience of Broonzy's music as having been "Fuck, what is that? Who is that?" Another musician heavily influenced by Broonzy was Jerry Garcia, who upon hearing a recording of Broonzy's blues playing decided to exchange an accordion he received on his 15th birthday for an electric guitar.

In the benediction at the 2009 inauguration ceremony of President Barack Obama, the civil rights leader Rev. Dr. Joseph Lowery paraphrased Broonzy's song "Black, Brown and White Blues".

In collaboration with the WFMT network, the Chicago History Museum, and the Library of Congress, an hour-long interview of Broonzy, recorded on September 13, 1955, by Studs Terkel was made available online. The interview includes reflections on his life and on the blues tradition, a performance of one of his most famous songs, "Alberta", and performances of "Goin' Down the Road Feelin' Bad" and other classics.

== Discography ==
Between 1927 and 1942, Broonzy recorded 224 songs, which makes him the second most prolific blues recording artist during that period. These were released before blues records were tracked by recording industry trade magazines. By the time Billboard magazine instituted its "race music" charts in October 1942, Broonzy's recordings were less popular, and none appeared in the charts.

=== Selected singles ===
Many of Broonzy's singles were issued by more than one record company, sometimes under different names. Additional versions of some songs were also released. These are marked with a superscript plus sign.

Date	Title	Label & Cat. no.	Comments
1927	"House Rent Stomp"	Paramount 12656^{+}	as Big Bill and Thomps
1927	"Big Bill Blues"	Paramount 12656	as Big Bill and Thomps
1930	"Station Blues"	Paramount 13084	as Big Bill Broomsley
1930	"Saturday Night Rub"	Perfect 147^{+}	as Famous Hokum Boys
1930	"I Can't Be Satisfied"	Perfect 157	as Sammy Sampson
1932	"Mistreatin' Mama"	Champion 16396^{+}	as Big Bill Johnson
1934	"At the Break of Day"	Bluebird 5571^{+}	
1934	"C. C. Rider"	Melotone 13311^{+}	
1935	"Midnight Special"	Vocalion 03004	as State Street Boys
1935	"Bricks in My Pillow"	ARC 6–03–62	
1936	"Matchbox Blues"	ARC 6–05–56^{+}	
1937	"Mean Old World"	Melotone 7–07–64^{+}	
1937	"Louise Louise Blues"	Vocalion 03075^{+}	
1938	"New Shake 'Em on Down"	Vocalion 04149^{+}	electric guitar by George Barnes
1938	"Night Time Is the Right Time No. 2"	Vocalion 04149^{+}	electric guitar by George Barnes
1939	"Just a Dream"	Vocalion 04706^{+}	
1939	"Too Many Drivers"	Vocalion 05096	
1940	"You Better Cut That Out"	Okeh 05919	
1940	"Lonesome Road Blues"	Okeh 06031	
1940	"Rockin' Chair Blues"	Okeh 06116^{+}	
1941	"All By Myself"	Okeh 06427^{+}	
1941	"Key to the Highway"	Okeh 06242^{+}	
1941	"Wee Wee Hours"	Okeh 06552	
1941	"I Feel So Good"	Okeh 06688^{+}	
1942	"I'm Gonna Move to the Outskirts of Town"	Okeh 06651	as Big Bill & His Chicago 5
1945	"Please Believe Me"	Hub 3003-A (HU418B)	as Little Sam, blues vocalist, with Don Byas Quartet
1945	"Why Did You Do That To Me"	Hub 3003-B (HU 419B)	as Little Sam, blues vocalist, with Don Byas Quartet
1951	"Hey Hey"	Mercury 8271	

Broonzy also appeared as a sideman on recordings by Lil Green, Sonny Boy Williamson I, Washboard Sam, Jazz Gillum and other Bluebird Records artists.

=== Albums ===
- Big Bill Broonzy and Washboard Sam (1953)
- Big Bill Broonzy and Roosevelt Sykes (DVD, recorded 1956)
- His Story (Folkways Records, 1957)
- Big Bill Broonzy Sings Country Blues (Folkways Records FA 2326, 1957)
- Blues with Big Bill Broonzy, Sonny Terry and Brownie McGhee (Folkways Records, 1959)
- Big Bill Broonzy Sings Folk Songs (Folkways Records FA 2328, 1962)
- Big Bill Broonzy Sings Folk Songs (Smithsonian Folkways, 1989) (reissue)
- Best of the Blues Tradition (1991)
- Do That Guitar Rag (1928–1935) (1991)
- Trouble in Mind (Smithsonian Folkways, 2000)
- Broonzy Volume 2: 1945–1949: The Post War Years (2000)
- Big Bill Broonzy in Concert (2002)
- Big Bill Broonzy on Tour in Britain: Live in England & Scotland (2002)
- Big Bill Blues: His 23 Greatest Songs 1927–42 (2004)
- Get Back (2004)
- Big Bill Amsterdam Live Concerts 1953 (2006)
- Keys to the Blues (2009)
- All The Classics 1936-1937, Vol. 4 (2019)

== Bibliography ==
- Barlow, William (1989). Looking Up at Down: The Emergence of Blues Culture. Temple University Press. ISBN 0-87722-583-4.
- Charters, Samuel B. (1960). The Country Blues. London: Michael Joseph. OCLC 648527768.
- Dahl, Bill (2003). Blues Is My Business (Album liner notes). Fuel 2000.
- Davis, Francis (2003). The History of the Blues. Da Capo Press. ISBN 0-306-81296-7.
- Davies, L. (2020). “Those Songs Are Gonna Be Sung All Over This World!”: Josh White, Big Bill Broonzy, and the Tangled Routes of Folk Blues in Early Postwar Britain. The Global South, 14(1), 68–93.
- Eagle, Bob L.; LeBlanc, Eric S. (2013). Blues: A Regional Experience. Santa Barbara, California: Praeger. ISBN 978-0313344237.
- Greene, Kevin D. (2018). The Invention and Reinvention of Big Bill Broonzy. Chapel Hill, North Carolina: University of North Carolina Press. ISBN 978-1-4696-4649-7.
- Harper, Colin (2006). Dazzling Stranger: Bert Jansch and the British Folk and Blues Revival. Bloomsbury.
- Herzhaft, Gerard (1992). "Big Bill Broonzy". Encyclopedia of the Blues. Fayetteville, Arkansas: University of Arkansas Press. ISBN 1-55728-252-8.
- James, Steve (1996). "Big Bill Broonzy". In Erlewine, Michael; Bogdanov, Vladimir; Woodstra, Chris; Koda, Cub (eds.). All Music Guide to the Blues. San Francisco, California: Miller Freeman Books. ISBN 0-87930-424-3.
- Palmer, Robert (1982). Deep Blues. New York City: Penguin Books. ISBN 0-14006-223-8.
- Perone, James E. (2019). Listen to the Blues!: Exploring a Musical Genre. Santa Barbara, California: ABC-CLIO. ISBN 978-1-4408-6614-2.
- Riesman, Bob (2011). I Feel So Good: The Life and Times of Big Bill Broonzy. University of Chicago Press. ISBN 978-0-226-71745-6.
- Russell, Tony (1997). The Blues: From Robert Johnson to Robert Cray. Dubai: Carlton Books. ISBN 1-85868-255-X.
- Stambler, Irwin; Landon, Grelun (1983). The Encyclopedia of Folk, Country & Western Music. New York City: St. Martin's Press. ISBN 0-312-24818-0.
- Wald, Elijah (2004). Escaping the Delta: Robert Johnson and the Invention of the Blues. New York City: Amistad. ISBN 978-0-06-052427-2.
- Whitburn, Joel (1988). "Artists". Top R&B Singles 1942–1988. Menomonee Falls, Wisconsin: Record Research. ISBN 0-89820-068-7.
