= Gate of Horn =

American folk music club in Chicago

Coordinates: 41.8965°N 87.6295°W

The Gate of Horn was a 100-seat folk music club, located in the basement of the Rice Hotel at 755 N. Dearborn St. at the corner of Chicago Avenue, on the near north side of Chicago, Illinois, in the 1950s and 1960s. It was opened by journalist Les Brown and Albert Grossman in 1956. It was where Odetta, Bob Gibson, Roger McGuinn and others made their name. Also appearing at the club were Theodore Bikel, Josh White (Sr. and Jr.), Oscar Brown, Jo Mapes, Brownie McGhee, Sonny Terry, Clancy Brothers and Tommy Makem, the New Lost City Ramblers, Judy Collins, Hoyt Axton, Jim Croce and Bonnie Dobson. Bill Cosby and George Carlin also performed as comedians at the club.

Bob Gibson was its frequent Master of Ceremonies (M.C.) and often introduced new talent at the Gate of Horn. He met a quiet, shy singer with a great voice named Joan Baez at the Newport Folk Festival and persuaded her to perform at the Gate of Horn after the festival. Many of those who performed at the Gate of Horn were interviewed by Studs Terkel for his radio show Studs Terkel's Wax Museum which also helped build the folk music revival in Chicago. Gibson was also one of the forces behind the influential Old Town School of Folk Music for several decades after the 1960s.

In April 1961, Gibson and Bob Camp recorded their folk album Bob Gibson & Bob Camp at the Gate Of Horn at the club.

The Gate of Horn outgrew its basement and moved to a larger venue on Rush Street near Oak. This was also one of the clubs at which stand-up comedian Lenny Bruce performed, in December 1962, before his arrest and trial for obscenity. When the Gate of Horn folded, its space was filled for several years by Second City. The original Gate of Horn site at 755 N. Dearborn is now a hi-rise rental apartment building; a similar fate befell the building which last housed the 1950s and 1960s free-speech coffee house "The College of Complexes" which was at 515 N. Clark Street—a few short blocks away.

McGuinn later wrote the song "Gate of Horn" about the venue and the way it affected him.

== Albums recorded at the Gate of Horn ==
- 1957: At the Gate of Horn (Odetta, 1957), Tradition TLP1025 **Although titled "At the Gate of Horn," Odetta's album is not a live recording from the club. Rather, it is named such because it is representative of the set she performed there.
- 1959: Memphis Slim at the Gate of Horn (Memphis Slim, 1959)
- 1961: Gibson & Camp at the Gate of Horn (Bob Gibson and Bob Camp, 1961)
- 1962: Hearty and Hellish (The Clancy Brothers and Tommy Makem, 1961)
- 1995: Live 1962: Busted! (Lenny Bruce, recorded Dec. 4, 1962)

== Appearances in film ==
The Gate of Horn appears in the 2013 film Inside Llewyn Davis; its exterior as a visual effect with a set construction interior.
