= Old Town School of Folk Music =

Chicago music institution

Coordinates: 41°55′4.80″N 87°39′4.78″W

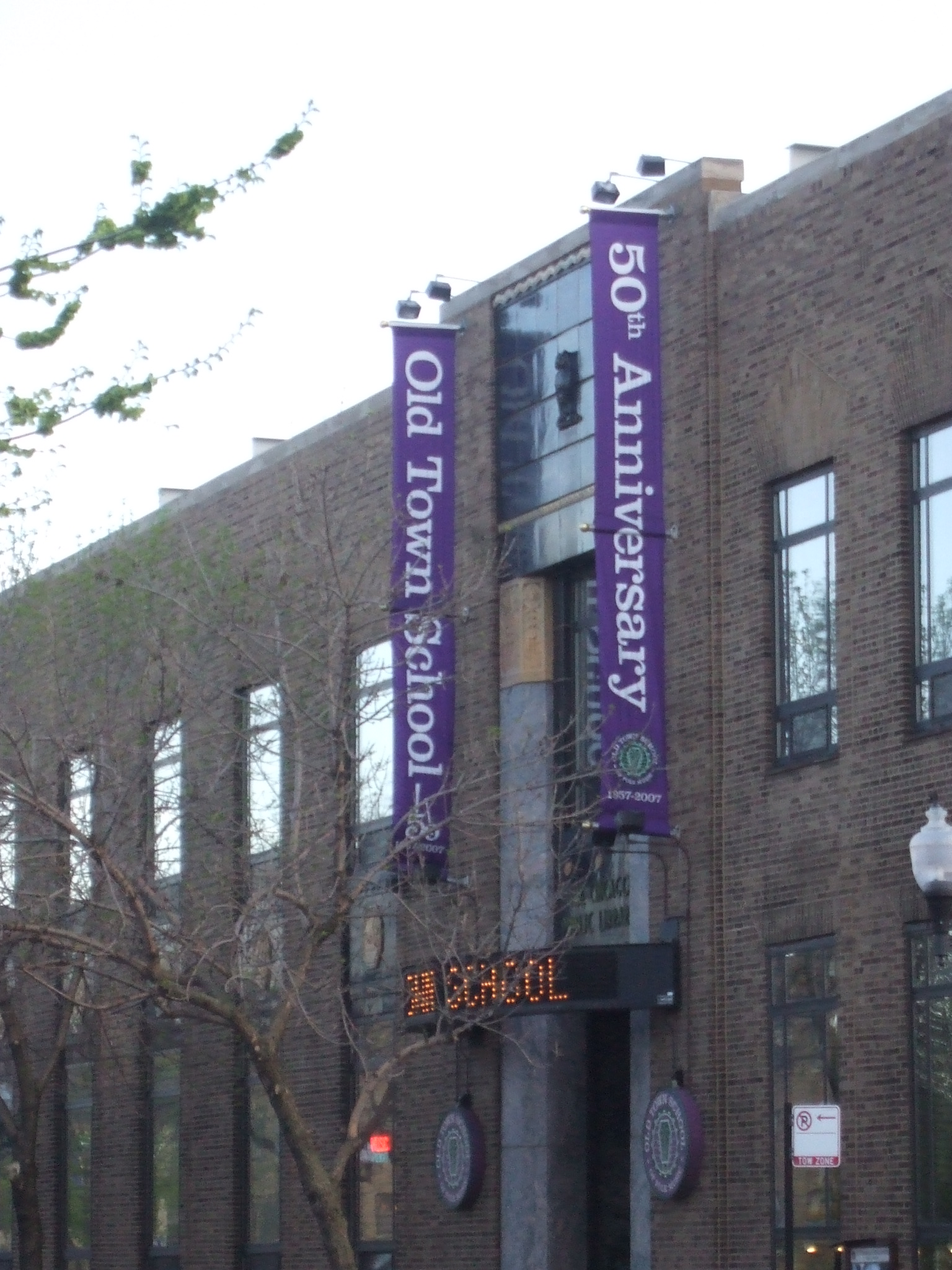
The Old Town School of Folk Music celebrated its 50th anniversary in 2007.

The Old Town School of Folk Music is a Chicago teaching and performing institution that launched the careers of many notable folk music artists. Founded by Folk musicians Frank Hamilton and Win Stracke, and Dawn Greening, the School opened in the Old Town neighborhood of Chicago in 1957 (the original location at 333 west North Avenue has since been demolished). It began by offering guitar and banjo lessons in a communal teaching style and hosting performances by well-known folk musicians. Currently the school has an enrollment of about 6,000 students per week, 2,700 of them children.

== History ==
=== Founding ===
We wanted to make music accessible to everyone, we wanted to bypass the formal educative type of note-reading you'd get in a music academy and emphasize the social aspects of music. We wanted to see involvement by people who wouldn't normally think they had musical talent, and bring out whatever they had.

— Frank Hamilton

The Old Town School of Folk Music was originally established by Dawn Greening in her family dining room.

Greening and her family acted as a support system to a vast community of struggling folk artists. Doc Watson, Pete Seeger and Odetta were among the artists that were always welcome in their home and treated as family. Despite social backlash from neighbors, Greening persevered to create a hub for their alternative grass-roots community. She coordinated students and teachers to regularly come into her home and experience folk music as she envisioned it: a quilt of tradition and history meant to bring folks from all walks of life together. With her support, Win Stracke and Frank Hamilton were able to formally open the school on December 1, 1957.

Stracke was a classically trained singer and Hamilton was a young multi-instrumentalist and teacher of folk music; Hamilton had previously studied under Bess Lomax Hawes, daughter of folklorist John Lomax. Stracke and Hamilton met at the Gate of Horn nightclub in Chicago where they were both performing.

Coming together with Greening, Hamilton and Stracke developed a classroom technique based upon traditional oral and folk teaching methods: listening, watching, trial and error, and playing by ear. Where other music schools taught sight reading and performance, Greening, Stracke and Hamilton wanted the Old Town School "method" to retain its emphasis on participation and development of aural skills.

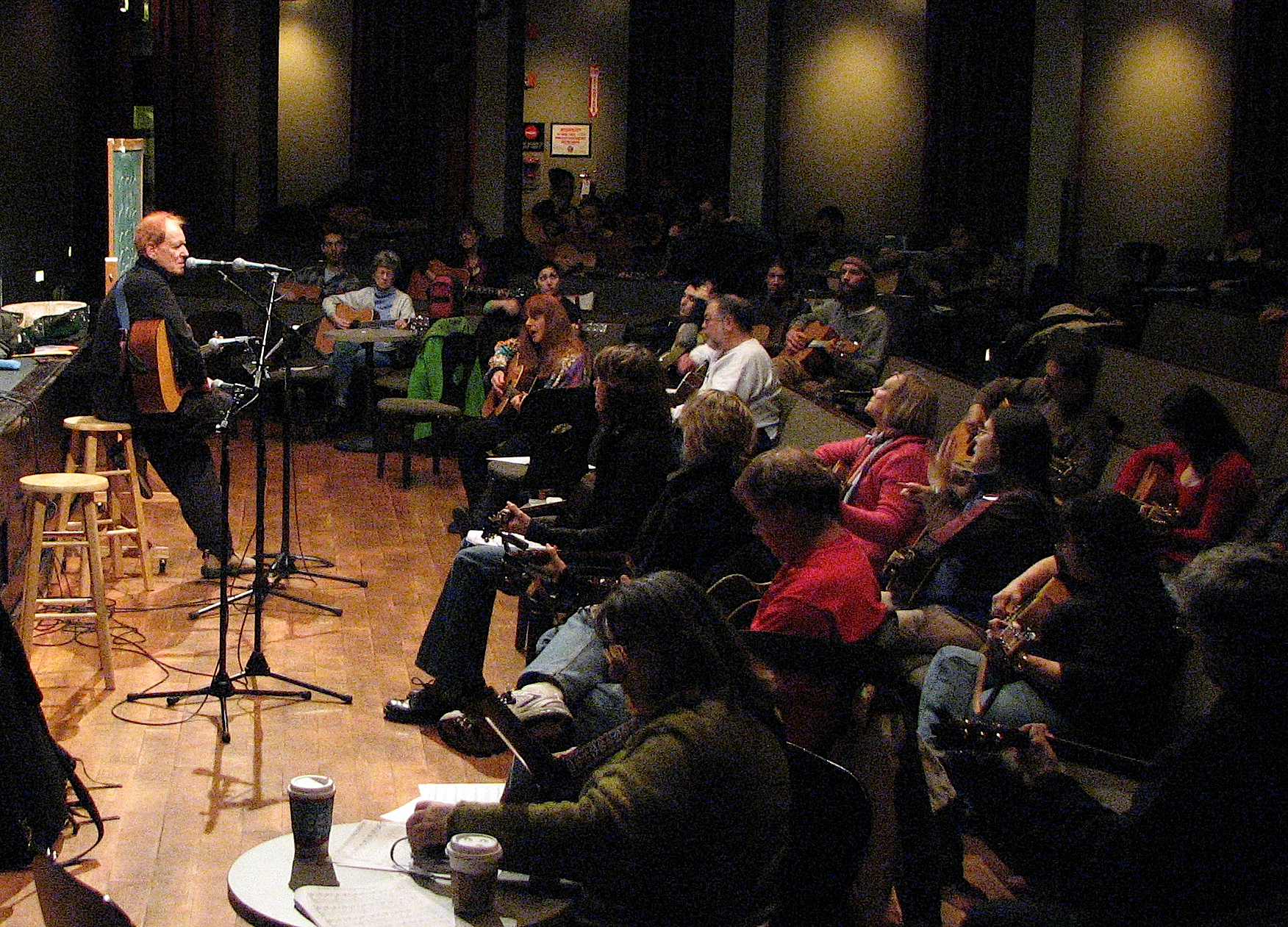
Founder Frank Hamilton teaching a workshop. November 2007

Several of the early faculty at the Old Town School were past members of Win Stracke's the "I Come For to Sing" review. A folk review performed by a rotating group of artists, the program was a variety show in which each program revolved around a particular topic, the songs and readings presented would all deal with that topic. Win Stracke, Studs Terkel, Big Bill Broonzy, and Fleming Brown were all members of "I Come For to Sing" at different times. The school would also publish a folk magazine by the same name from 1975-1987.

=== Songbook ===
The initial version of the Old Town School Songbook was an unbound stack of pages to be added to a three ring binder. It was a collection of 94 songs mostly North American in origin, but selections from Israel, Ireland, England, and Chile were added. In keeping with the teaching philosophy of the school it favored many songs which were suitable for group involvement. Each page had a short history of the song, the chord progression, rhythm indicators, a transcription of the melody and lyrics for the verses. Chord fingering charts were provided for guitar and banjo.

=== 1950s, 1960s and early 1970s ===
Pete Seeger, Mahalia Jackson, Jimmy Driftwood, Big Bill Broonzy, and Josh White all performed at the Old Town School in its early years. Early teachers at the school included Chicago blues guitarist Big Bill Broonzy, and banjo players Fleming Brown and Stu Ramsey as well as the Brazilian singer-guitarist Valucha deCastro (a.k.a. Valucha Buffington). The formation and growth of the School coincided with the folk music boom of the 1960s and early 1970s. In Chicago, folk influence was scattered in Hyde Park (site of the Folk Festival), Oak Park (where Greening lived), and Old Town. The school's first location was a rundown storefront at 333 W. North Ave. in Old Town.

Throughout its existence the School has focused on offering both instruction and performance with many performing musicians also acting as teachers and mentors. The School also proved a rich ground for collaboration. The late 1960s were a peak of success as several musicians associated with the School rose to national prominence, including Roger McGuinn of The Byrds, Fred Holstein, John Prine, Judy Collins, Steve Goodman, Bonnie Koloc, and Bob Gibson. The school moved into a more permanent home at 909 West Armitage Ave.

=== 1970s & 1980s: Decline & Renewal ===
Enrollment peaked in 1975 with about 650 students per-week, but as the folk revival declined in the mid-1970s so did the fortunes of the School; although it continued to provide music lessons to hundreds of students the School suffered financial difficulties and was on the brink of bankruptcy in 1981. It was discussed at this time to move the School from its aging facilities on Armitage Avenue to the suburbs.

The Old Town School of Folk Music (OTSFM), was having a near death experience in the late 1980s. On revenues of $200,000 per year the school was losing $40,000 per year, with no money in the bank. The school had ceased to be relevant to its markets, and new customers were not being attracted to the school's programming. In order to survive, the school needed to develop a new strategy. So it developed three: 1. The school could not pay its bills, so one strategy was to reduce costs and raise cash. Goal: Return to net profitability within 12 months. 2. Develop relevant new products to attract new customers. Goal: Increase revenues by 40% per year through new product offerings. 3. Raise money to renovate the school's main building at 909 Armitage Ave. and conference hall. Goal: Raise $600,000 over the next 24 months.

A new Executive Director, Jim Hirsch, was hired at the beginning of the turnaround. One member of the Board and Jim reviewed all of the financial numbers and decided what they could control, and where cuts were necessary. Reducing costs involved laying off guitar instructors, who were struggling to make a living as artists. The little that the OTSFM paid them was still a meaningful amount in their lives, but an expense the school had to reduce in order to survive. The layoffs were painful, but amazingly half of the staff agreed to work for free, during the transition. They understood the situation faced by the school. Each creditor, and there were many, to whom the school owed money, was met face-to-face. A plan was offered to pay them; if they could extend a little more credit to the school. Growth takes time to build, but cost reductions can happen (no matter how painful) immediately.

The school faced several tough choices. The school owned two buildings. It was a painful choice, but the school's board decided to sell one of its buildings, so that bills could be paid and agreements kept.

The school also needed to look at its programs and concert offerings to the public. Michael Miles was hired to work on the school's programming. If the school wanted to survive over the long term, it needed to offer more exciting products (concerts, lessons, etc.) and draw in a broader, more ethnically diversified customer base. The OTSFM expanded its concert offerings and guitar instruction lessons. A new 'Wiggleworms' program was put together to teach music to little children (under 5 years old), and Jim put together a "Latin Music Festival" that was the first such offering in Chicago by a non-Latino institution. This was highlighted in February 1989 by a performance from Jesus "Chucho" Rodriguez & Henry Hernandez with their Indian Harp and The Inca Peruvian Highland Wind Ensemble. These programs resulted in a much more ethnically diversified audience and helped with revenue growth.

Execution of the above changes was primarily done by the school's staff. The board (a group of volunteers) took responsibility for raising $600,000 to do the renovation. Just like a good song needs a 'hook' to resonate with a listener, the school needed a 'hook' to interest funding organizations and individual contributors. The school's success with its new products for a diversified audience was a primary reason funding organizations agreed to provide support to the school's capital campaign.

Since then the school has had a renaissance. Its annual revenues are in excess of several million dollars. It renovated its old building, later a new one was purchased and renovated with money from an even larger capital campaign. The new venue has a larger concert stage and teaching capacity. That new building helped to lead the way for rebuilding a Chicago neighborhood. Currently, the school's concerts and teaching programs are full, and there is an involvement of volunteers, customers and staff. It impacts more people's lives today than at any time in its past

=== 1990s ===
After occupying a building at 909 West Armitage Avenue in Chicago's Lincoln Park neighborhood since 1968, the Old Town School in 1998 expanded into a new and larger main branch in the former Hild Library at 4544 North Lincoln Avenue, with a 400-seat concert hall. The move allowed the school room to expand its music education program significantly.

=== 2010s ===
In October 2018, the school announced that it would sell its Armitage building to gain endowment money. Teachers and community members blasted the decision for being shortsighted and taken without feedback from the community. The following March, the school announced that it had reconsidered and would not sell the building, instead focusing on increasing enrollment. Meanwhile, the faculty voted to unionize, associating itself with the Illinois Federation of Teachers.

== Today ==
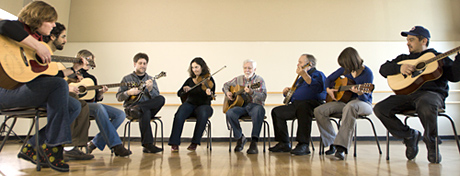
A jam session at the Old Town School of Folk Music in 2009.

Today, the Old Town School continues to offer music and dance classes and performances for adults and children at both locations and children's classes in some suburban branch locations. Students from all over the Chicago area attend weekly classes taught by dedicated professionals. Students can also take ensemble classes, working with others on the music of groups like The Beatles, The Grateful Dead, Neil Young, Bob Dylan, and many others. Most classes perform at the end of the eight-week session in a showcase or at local venues. The current enrollment is about 7,000 students per week.

Many well-known folk, world, bluegrass, jazz, blues and country musicians from all over the world perform at the 4544 North Lincoln Avenue location. Additionally, Old Town School’s programming and resources for teens, which include Teen Arts Collectives, Teen Advisory Council, and a monthly Teen Open Mic, have spawned a significant youth music scene, including the bands Horsegirl and Lifeguard.

The Old Town School Music Store is located at 4544 North Lincoln Avenue. There was previously a second storefront at 909 West Armitage Avenue, which is no longer in operation.

Since 1997, Old Town School hosts the Chicago Folk & Roots Festival in nearby Welles Park. However, in 2012, the School announced it would not organize the event due to rising costs from city policy changes. Instead, in collaboration with The Lincoln Square Chamber of Commerce, Old Town School hosted the Square Roots festival.

On December 1, 2007, Old Town School celebrated its 50th anniversary with a concert at Chicago's Auditorium Theatre featuring Jeff Tweedy, Bela Fleck & Abigail Washburn, David Bromberg, Bonnie Koloc, Frank & Mary Hamilton, Lonnie Brooks with Wayne Baker Brooks and Nicholas Tremulis and Luna Negra Dance Theater.

In July 2010, the School announced the planned $18 million expansion of their facility to include new classroom and theater space across the street from their current location (on an empty lot purchased in 2005). The new building opened at 4545 North Lincoln Avenue on January 9, 2012. It adds more than 27,000 square feet of classrooms and a 150-seat flexible use hall called The Myron R. Szold Music and Dance Hall.

In 2026, a mural commemorating John Prine was painted on the side of the 4544 N Lincoln Avenue building.

== See also ==
- Category:Old Town School of Folk musicians - a Wikipedia category listing Old Town affiliated artists
