= Carter Family discography =

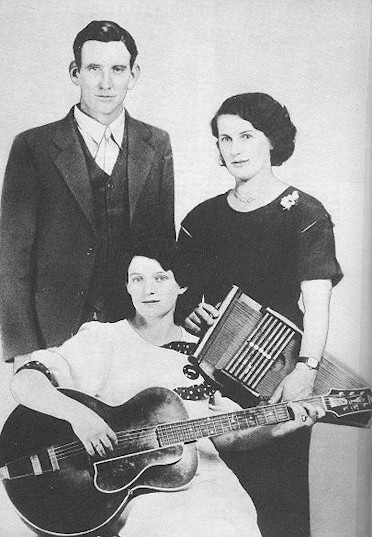
- Studio albums: 32
- EPs: 17
- Compilation albums: 62
- Singles: 33

This is a discography of the Carter Family—Sara Carter, her husband A.P. Carter, and their sister-in-law Maybelle Carter—often cited as "the most influential group in country music history": (For recordings by the second generation of the Carter Family see The Carter Sisters.)

== Singles ==
List of singles showing A-side, B-side, year released and label
Year	A-side	B-side	Label
1927	"The Poor Orphan Child"	"The Wandering Boy"	Victor (20877)
1927	"Single Girl, Married Girl"	"The Storms Are on the Ocean"	Victor (20937)
1927	"Bury Me Under the Weeping Willow"	"Little Log Cabin by the Sea"	Victor (21074)
1928	"River of Jordan"	"Keep on the Sunny Side"	Victor (21434)
1928	"Chewing Gum"	"I Ain't Goin' to Work Tomorrow"	Victor (21517)
1928	"Will You Miss Me When I'm Gone?"	"Little Darling, Pal of Mine"	Victor (21638)
1929	"Wildwood Flower"	"Forsaken Love"	Victor (V-40000)
1929	"I Have No One to Love (But the Sailor on the Deep Blue Sea)"	"Anchored in Love"	Victor (V-40036)
1929	"My Clinch Mountain Home"	"The Foggy Mountain Top"	Victor (V-40058)
1929	"Engine One-Forty-Three"	"I'm Thinking Tonight of My Blue Eyes"	Victor (V-40089)
1929	"Little Moses"	"God Gave Noah the Rainbow Sign"	Victor (V-40110)
1929	"Sweet Fern"	"Lulu Wall"	Victor (V-40126)
1929	"Diamonds in the Rough"	"The Grave on the Green Hillside"	Victor (V-40150)
1929	"John Hardy Was a Desperate Little Man"	"Bring Back My Blue-Eyed Boy to Me"	Victor (V-40190)
1930	"The Homestead on the Farm"	"The Cyclone of the Ryecove"	Victor (V-40207)
1930	"When the Roses Bloom in Dixieland"	"No Telephone in Heaven"	Victor (V-40229)
1930	"Western Hobo"	"A Distant Land to Roam"	Victor (V-40255)
1930	"The Lover's Farewell"	"Kitty Waltz"	Victor (V-40277)
1930	"When the World's on Fire"	"When the Springtime Comes Again"	Victor (V-40293)
1930	"Worried Man Blues"	"The Cannon Ball"	Victor (V-40317)
1930	"Don't Forget This Song"	"The Little Log Hut in the Lane"	Victor (V-40328)
1931	"On the Rock Where Moses Stood"	"Darling Nellie Across the Sea"	Victor (23513)
1931	"Where Shall I Be?"	"No More the Moon Shines on Lorena"	Victor (23523)
1931	"Lonesome Valley"	"The Birds Were Singing of You"	Victor (23541)
1931	"There's Someone Awaiting for Me"	"Jimmie Brown, the Newsboy"	Victor (23554)
1931	"Can't Feel at Home"	"When I'm Gone"	Victor (23569)
1931	"Jimmie Rodgers Visits the Carter Family" (Jimmie Rodgers assisted by the Carter Family)	"Moonlight and Skies" (Jimmie Rodgers)	Victor (23574)
1931	"Fond Affection"	"Sow 'Em on the Mountain"	Victor (23585)
1931	"My Old Cottage"	"Lonesome for You"	Victor (23599)
1931	"Let the Church Roll On"	"Room in Heaven for Me"	Victor (23618)
1932	"Sunshine in the Shadows"	"Weary Prodigal Son"	Victor (23626)
1932	"The Dying Soldier"	"Motherless Children"	Victor (23641)
1932	"Tell Me That You Love Me"	"I Never Loved But One"	Victor (23656)
1932	"Where We'll Never Grow Old"	"We Will March Through the Streets of the City"	Victor (23672)
1932	"Picture on the Wall"	"'Mid the Green Fields of Virginia"	Victor (23686)
1932	"Happiest Days of All"	"Amber Tresses"	Victor (23701)
1932	"Carter's Blues"	"Lonesome Pine Special"	Victor (23716)
1932	"Meet Me by Moonlight, Alone"	"Wabash Cannonball"	Victor (23731)
1933	"Will the Roses Bloom in Heaven"	"The Spirit of Love Watches Over Me"	Victor (23748)
1933	"Sweet as the Flowers in May Time"	"If One Won't Another One Will"	Victor (23761)
1933	"The Sun of the Soul"	"The Church in the Wildwood"	Victor (23776)
1933	"Two Sweethearts"	"The Broken-Hearted Lover"	Victor (23791)
1933	"The Winding Stream"	"I Wouldn't Mind Dying"	Victor (23807)
1933	"Gold Watch and Chain"	"Give Me Roses While I Live"	Victor (23821)
1933	"I Loved You Better Than You Knew"	"See That My Grave Is Kept Green"	Victor (23835)
1933	"On the Sea of Galilee"	"This Is Like Heaven to Me"	Victor (23845)
1934	"Hello, Central! Give Me Heaven"	"I'll Be All Smiles Tonight"	Bluebird (B-5529)
1934	"Darling Daisies"	"Lover's Return"	Bluebird (B-5586)
1934	"Happy or Lonesome"	"The East Virginia Blues"	Bluebird (B-5650)
1934	"I'm Working on a Building"	"When the Roses Bloom in Dixieland"	Bluebird (B-5716)

== Selected 78 rpm records ==
The Carter Family's career predated any sort of best-selling chart of country music records. (Billboard did not have a country best sellers chart until 1944.) Below is a select list of their 78 rpm releases.

Bluebird Records

- "Anchored in Love"
- "I'll Be All Smiles Tonight"
- "Keep on the Sunny Side"
- "Little Moses"
- "Mid the Green Fields of Virginia"
- "My Clinch Mountain Home"
- "Picture on the Wall"
- "Wabash Cannonball"
- "Wildwood Flower"
- "Worried Man Blues"

Montgomery Ward Records

- "Lonesome Pine Special"
- "Two Sweethearts"
- "Where We'll Never Grow Old"

Decca Records

- "Coal Miner Blues"
- "Hello Stranger"
- "My Dixie Darling"
- "You Are My Flower"

Victor Records

- "Bury Me Beneath the Weeping Willow"
- "Foggy Mountain Top"
- "Gold Watch and Chain"
- "I'm Thinking Tonight of My Blue Eyes"
- "Keep on the Firing Line"
- "My Old Cottage Home"
- "On the Sea of Gallee"
- "The Church in the Wildwood"
- "The Storms Are on the Ocean"

Vocalion Records

- "Broken Hearted Love"
- "Can the Circle Be Unbroken"

== Selected vinyl albums ==
The long-playing album did not debut until several years after the Carter Family disbanded. Most of the full-length LPs issued under "the Carter Family" were budget albums as was traditional on most vintage recordings.

Year	Album	Label
1960	All Time Favorites	ACME Records
1962	The Original and Great Carter Family	RCA Camden Records
1963	Mid the Green Fields of Virginia	RCA Victor Records
1964	More Favorites by The Carter Family	Decca Records
1965	Great Sacred Songs	Harmony Records
1966	Home Among the Hills	Harmony Records
1966	The Happiest Days of All	RCA Camden Records
1967	More Golden Gems	RCA Camden Records
1972	Lonesome Pine Special	RCA Camden Records
1973	My Old Cottage Home	RCA Camden Records
1974	Legendary Performers	RCA Records
2017	American Epic: The Best of The Carter Family	Lo-Max, Sony Legacy, Third Man

== Rounder CD compilations ==
Year	Album	Label
1993	Anchored in Love: Their Complete Victor Recordings (1927–1928)	Rounder
1993	My Clinch Mountain Home: Their Complete Victor Recordings (1928–1929)	Rounder
1995	When the Roses Bloom in Dixieland: Their Complete Victor Recordings (1929–1930)	Rounder
1995	Worried Man Blues: Their Complete Victor Recordings (1930)	Rounder
1996	Sunshine in the Shadows: Their Complete Victor Recordings (1931–1932)	Rounder
1997	Give Me the Roses While I Live: Their Complete Victor Recordings (1932–1933)	Rounder
1998	Gold Watch and Chain: Their Complete Victor Recordings (1933–1934)	Rounder
1998	Longing for Old Virginia: Their Complete Victor Recordings (1934)	Rounder
1998	Last Sessions: Their Complete Victor Recordings (1934–1941)	Rounder

== Boxed sets ==
Year	Album	Notes	Label
2000	In The Shadow of Clinch Mountain	Complete recorded works for Victor, ARC, Decca, APS, Columbia and Bluebird Records on 12 CDs, as well as interviews with group members all packaged with a hardcover booklet of 220 pages.	Bear Family Records
2002 and 2003	The Carter Family Volume 1: 1927–1934 and The Carter Family Volume 2: 1935–1941	Two boxed sets, each with five CDs of original recordings remastered. Volume 1 of 127 songs originally recorded for RCA Victor from 1927–1934 and Volume 2 of 130 songs recorded for RCA Victor plus ARC and Decca labels (Decca owned both) from 1935–1941.	JSP Records

== Singles & EPs ==
- River Of Jordan / Keep On the Sunny Side (Shellac, 10") Victor 21434 1927
- I Have No One To Love Me (Shellac, 10") Victor V-40036 1928
- Will You Miss Me When I'm Gone? / Little Darling, Pal Of Mine (Shellac, 10") Victor 21638 1928
- Engine One-Forty-Three / I'm Thinking To-Night Of My Blue Eyes (Shellac, 10") Victor V-40089 1929
- Wildwood Flower / Forsaken Love (Shellac, 10") Victor V-40000 1929
- My Clinch Mountain Home / The Foggy Mountain Top (Shellac, 10") Victor V-40058 1929
- Worried Man Blues / The Cannon Ball (Shellac, 10") Victor V-40317 1930
- Sweet As The Flowers In May Time / If One Won't Another One Will (Shellac, 10", Single) Victor 23761 1932
- Will The Roses Bloom In Heaven / We Will March Through The Streets Of The City (Shellac, 10") Bluebird (3) B-5161 1933
- When The Springtime Comes Again / I'm Thinking To-Night Of My Blue Eyes (Shellac, 10") Bluebird (3) B-5122 1933
- Happy Or Lonesome / The East Virginia Blues (Shellac, 10") Bluebird (3) B-5650 1934
- Hello, Central! Give Me Heaven / I'll Be All Smiles Tonight (Shellac, 10") Bluebird (3) B-5529 1934
- Can the Circle Be Unbroken (By and By) / Glory To The Lamb (Shellac, 10") Perfect (3) 13155 1935

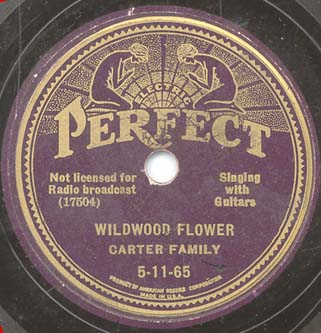
A record of the Carter Family's biggest seller "Wildwood Flower"

- My Texas Girl (Shellac, 10") Banner 17481 1935
- He Took A White Rose From Her Hair (Shellac, 10") Melotone 13429 1935
- Little Darling Pal Of Mine (Shellac, 10") Romeo 17504 1935
- Diamonds In The Rough / John Hardy Was A Desperate Little Man (Shellac, 10") Bluebird (3) B-6033 1935
- Can The Circle Be Unbroken / Glory To The Lamb (Shellac, 10") Conqueror 8529 1935
- The Homestead On The Farm (Shellac, 10") Perfect (3) 17520 1937
- Just A Few More Days / Little Joe (Shellac, 10") Decca 5632 1939
- Wabash Cannonball / I Never Will Marry (Shellac, 10") Bluebird (3) B-8350 1939
- Heaven's Radio / Meeting In The Air (Shellac, 10") Okeh 05931 1940
- The Wave On The Sea / The Rambling Boy (Shellac, 10") Bluebird (3) 33-0512 1944
- When The World's On Fire / Keep On The Sunny Side (Shellac, 10") Bluebird (3) 33-0537 1945
- Jealous Hearted Me / Lay My Head Beneath The Rose (Shellac, 10") Decca 46005 1946
- Picture On The Wall / Keep On The Sunny Side (Shellac, 10") RCA Victor 20-3259 1948
- Mountain Music Volume 2 (7", EP) Brunswick OE 9168 1956
- The Original And Great Carter Family Vol. 3 2 versions RCA Victor, RCA Victor 1962
- The Original And Great Carter Family Vol. 1 (7", EP, Mono) RCA Victor RCX-7100 1962
- The Original And Great Carter Family Vol. 2 (7", EP, Mono) RCA Victor, RCA Victor RCX-7101, 45-RCX-7101 1962
- The Original And Great Carter Family Vol. 6 (7", Mono) RCA Victor RCX-7111 1963
- The Original And Great Carter Family Vol. 5 (7", EP, Mono) RCA Victor RCX-7110 1963
- The Original And Great Carter Family Vol. 4 (7", EP, Mono) RCA Victor RCX-7109 1963
- Jealous Hearted Me (7", EP) Decca ED 2788 1965
- Anchored In Love (7", EP) Acme Records (6) DF-103 Unknown
- The Titanic (7", EP) Acme Records (6) DF-102 Unknown
- Sweet Fern (7", EP) RCA Victor 20369 Unknown
- Get Up Early In The Morning / Fourteen Carat Nothing (7", Promo) Liberty F55501 Unknown
- Picture On The Wall / Will You Miss Me When I'm Gone? (Shellac, 10") Montgomery Ward M-4228 Unknown
- No More The Moon Shines On Lorena / Jimmie Brown, The Newsboy (Shellac, 10") Montgomery Ward m-5027 Unknown
- The Spirit Of Her Watches Over Me / When The Springtime Comes Again (10") Montgomery Ward M-4227 Unknown
- Tell Me That You Love Me / I‘m Thinking Tonight Of My Blue Eyes (Shellac, 10") Montgomery Ward M-4230 Unknown
- Honey In The Rock (Shellac, 10") Montgomery Ward 8024 Unknown
- Two Sweethearts / The Broken-hearted Lover (Shellac, 10") Montgomery Ward M-4433 Unknown

== Albums ==
- Keep On The Sunny Side: In Memory Of A P Carter (LP) Acme Records (6) LP No. 2 1961
- The Carter Family Album 3 versions Liberty 1962
- The Original And Great Carter Family 5 versions RCA Camden 1962
- The Original And Great Carter Family (LP, Mono) RCA Camden CAL 586 1962
- A Collection Of Favorites By The Carter Family 3 versions Decca 1963
- Great Original Recordings By The Carter Family (LP, Album, Mono) Harmony (4) HL 7300 1963
- More Favorites By The Carter Family (LP, Album, Mono) Decca DL 4557 1965
- The Famous Carter Family 2 versions Harmony (4) 1970
- More Golden Gems From The Original Carter Family (LP) RCA CAS-2554 (e) 1972
- 'Mid The Green Fields Of Virginia 3 versions RCA 1963
- The Original Carter Family From 1936 Radio Transcripts 2 versions Old Homestead Records 1975
- The Original Carter Family Legendary Performers, Volume 1 (LP) RCA CPM1-2763 1979
- Clinch Mountain Treasures 2 versions County Records, Sony Music Special Products 1991
- Carter Family Favorites (CD, Album, Alb) Jasmine Records JASMCD 3592 2009
- A. P. Carter Memorial Album (7", Album) Acme Records (6) CF-105 Unknown
- Country Favorites (LP, Album, Mono) Sunset Records SUM-1153 Unknown
- The Carter Family In Texas Volume 7 (LP) Old Homestead Records OHCS 139 Unknown
- Look! (LP) Old Time Classics 6001 Unknown
- Country Sounds Of The Original Carter Family (LP, Mono) Harmony (4) HL 7422 Unknown
- Home Among The Hills (LP, Album) Harmony (4) HL 7344 Unknown
- Diamonds In The Rough (LP, Album) Copper Creek Records CCLP-0107 Unknown
- Great Sacred Songs (LP) Harmony (4) HL 7396 Unknown
- Gold Watch And Chain Vol. 3 (LP) Anthology Of Country Music ACM 22 Unknown
- A Sacred Collection (LP) Anthology Of Country Music ACM – 8 Unknown
- Early Classics (LP) Anthology Of Country Music ACM-15 Unknown

== Compilations ==
- Carter Family, The, Uncle Dave Macon, Gid Tanner & Riley Puckett – Authentic Country Music (LP, Comp, Mono) RCA Camden CDN-5111 1963
- Blackwood Brothers Quartet*, Stuart Hamblen, Original Carter Family, The*, Statesmen Quartet, The, Porter Wagoner, Speer Family, The – All-Night Sing (LP, Comp) RCA Camden CAL 767 1963
- The Best Of 3 versions Columbia 1965
- Carter Family, The Featuring A. P. Carter – Lonesome Pine Special 2 versions RCA Camden 1971
- My Old Cottage Home 2 versions RCA Camden 1973
- The Legendary Collection (1927–'34, '41) (10×LP, Comp, Mono + Box) RCA RA5641-50 1974
- Original Carter Family, The* Featuring A.P. Carter* – The Happiest Days Of All (LP, Comp, RM) RCA Camden ACL1-0501(e) 1974
- The Original Carter Family In Texas Volume 2 2 versions Old Homestead Records 1978
- Gospel Songs By The Carter Family In Texas / Volume 3 (LP, Comp, Mono) Old Homestead Records OHCS 116 1978
- Country & Western Classics (3×LP, Comp + Box) Time Life Records TLCW-06 1982
- The Original Carter Family In Texas Volume 5 (LP, Comp, Ltd) Old Homestead Records OHCS 130 1984
- The Original Carter Family In Texas Volume I (LP, Comp) Old Homestead Records OHCS 111 1984
- Volume 4 (LP, Comp) Old Homestead Records OHCS-117 1984
- 20 Of The Best (LP, Comp) RCA International NL 89369 1984
- The Country Music Hall Of Fame (CD, Comp) MCA Records MCAD-10088 1991
- The Country Music Hall Of Fame (CD, Comp, Club) MCA Records MCAD-10088 1991
- My Clinch Mountain Home: Their Complete Victor Recordings (1928-1929) (CD, Comp) Rounder Records CD 1065 1993
- Anchored in Love: Their Complete Victor Recordings (1927-1928) (CD, Comp) Rounder Records CD 1064 1993
- Worried Man Blues: Their Complete Victor Recordings (1930) (CD, Comp) Rounder Records CD 1067 1995
- When the Roses Bloom in Dixieland: Their Complete Victor Recordings (1929-1930) (CD, Comp) Rounder Records CD 1066 1995
- On Border Radio, Vol. 1 (CD, Comp) Arhoolie Records, Arhoolie Records CD 411, 411 1995
- Sunshine in the Shadows: Their Complete Victor Recordings (1931-1932) (CD, Comp) Rounder Records CD 1068 1996
- Greatest Hits (CD, Comp) KRB Music Companies KRB5155-2 1997
- Give Me the Roses While I Live: Their Complete Victor Recordings (1932-1933) (CD, Comp) Rounder Records CD 1069 1997
- Best Of The Best Of The Original Carter Family (CD, Comp) King Records (3), King Records (3), BMG Special Products KCD-1478, KSCD-1478, DRC11839 1997
- On Border Radio, Vol. 2 (CD, Comp) Arhoolie Records, Arhoolie Records CD 412, 412 1997
- Last Sessions: Their Complete Victor Recordings (1934-1941) (CD, Comp) Rounder Records CD 1072 1998
- Longing for Old Virginia: Their Complete Victor Recordings (1934) (CD, Comp) Rounder Records CD 1071 1998
- Gold Watch and Chain: Their Complete Victor Recordings (1933-1934) (CD, Comp) Rounder Records CD 1070 1998
- On Border Radio, Vol. 3 (CD, Comp) Arhoolie Records, Arhoolie Records CD 413, 413 1999
- The Best Of The Carter Family (CD, Comp) Prism Leisure PLATCD 548 1999
- Can The Circle Be Unbroken: Country Music's First Family 2 versions Columbia, Legacy 2000
- Famous Country Music Makers (CD, Comp) Castle Pulse PLS CD 358 2000
- The Best Of The Carter Family Volume Two (Wildwood Flower) (CD, Comp) Country Stars CTS 55465 2000
- In The Shadow Of Clinch Mountain (12×CD, Comp + Box) Bear Family Records BCD 15865 LK 2000
- Wildwood Flower (CD, Comp, Mono) ASV, Living Era CD AJA 5323 2000
- 1927–1934 3 versions JSP Records 2001
- The Decca Sessions Volume One (1936) (CD, Comp) Catfish Records KATCD188X 2001
- The Decca Sessions Vol. II (CD, Comp) Catfish Records KATCD218 2002
- Country & Folk Roots (CD, Comp) Castle Pulse PLSCD 651 2003
- Volume 2: 1935–1941 (5×CD, Comp, RM + Box) JSP Records JSP7708 2003
- RCA Country Legends (CD, Album, Comp) BMG Heritage 82876 59266 2 2004
- A Proper Introduction To The Carter Family – Keep On The Sunny Side (CD, Comp, RM) Proper Records Ltd. INTRO CD 2060 2004
- The Best Of The Carter Family (2×CD, Comp) Performance (7) 38126 2005
- The Best Of The Carter Family (CD, Comp, Club) MCA Nashville, Decca B0004544-02 2005
- Can The Circle Be Unbroken (2×CD, Comp, RM) Primo (2), Primo (2) PRMCD 6014, PRMCD6014 2006
- The Carter Family (CD, Comp) Direct Source Special Products Inc. AD 59012 2006
- Wildwood Flower (CD, Comp) Weton-Wesgram LATA188 2007
- Country Folk (4×CD, Comp, Album + Box) Proper Records Ltd. PROPERBOX 127 2007
- Wildwood Flower (2×CD, Comp) Not Now Music NOT2CD280 2008
- The Carter Family (Roots Of Country) (2×CD, Comp) Music Club Deluxe MCDLX102 2009
- I'm Thinking Tonight Of My Blue Eyes (LP, Comp) Monk (4) MK314 2010
- Bring Back My Blue-Eyed Boy To Me (LP, Comp) Monk (4) MK332 2010
- Greatest Hits 1927–1934 (CDr, Comp) Fabulous (3) FABCD146 2011
- American Epic: The Best of The Carter Family (Digital download) Lo-Max, Sony Legacy 2017
- The Carter Family On Border Radio (LP, Comp, Mono) John Edwards Memorial Foundation JEMF 101 Unknown
- The Original Carter Family In Texas Volume 6 (LP, Comp, Ltd) Old Homestead Records OHCS 136 Unknown
- Volume 3 (LP, Comp) CMH Records CMH 116 Unknown
- Volume 2 (LP, Comp) CMH Records CMH 112 Unknown
- Famous Country-Music Makers (2×LP, Comp, Gat) RCA DPM 2046 Unknown
- Volume 1 (LP, Comp) CMH Records CMH 107 Unknown
- Volume 4 (LP, Comp) CMH Records CMH 118 Unknown
- Famous Country Music Makers (LP, Comp, Mono) RCA Victor DPM 2046 Unknown
