= Last Session =

Last Session or variants may refer to:

== Albums ==
- Last Session (Grant Green album), final album by American jazz guitarist Grant Green featuring performances recorded in 1978
- Last Session, album by Blind Willie McTell
- Last Session, concert DVD by Sting (singer) and Gil Evans
- Last Sessions (Lenny Breau album)
- Last Sessions (Mississippi John Hurt album) 1972
- Last Sessions, by Jelly Roll Morton
- Last Sessions: Their Complete Victor Recordings (1934–1941), a compilation of recordings made by American country music group the Carter Family
- Last Sessions, 1933 Jimmie Rodgers (country singer) (1897–1933), known as the "Singing Brakeman"
- The Last Session (Lee Morgan album)
- The Last Session: A Fond Farewell, an album containing Ronnie Drew's final recordings, released in November 2008
- The Last Session, album by Charlie Shavers
- The Last Session, album by Cursed (band)
- The Last Session, album by Gene Vincent
- The Last Sessions (Patsy Cline album)
- The Last Sessions (Sonny Stitt album)
- The Last Sessions, album by Ernie Henry
- Columbia Lane – the Last Sessions, an album released by Australian country music singer Slim Dusty
- Last Trio Session, album by jazz pianist Wynton Kelly recorded in 1968 and released on the Delmark label in 1988

== Musical ==
- The Last Session (musical), musical with book by Jim Brochu and music and lyrics by Steve Schalchlin

== See also ==
- The Final Sessions, by jazz pianist Elmo Hope which compiles sessions recorded in 1966
