= A Distant Land to Roam: Songs of the Carter Family =

Studio album by Ralph Stanley
- Released: May 30, 2006
- Length: 46:37
- Label: DMZ / Columbia
- Producer: Bob Neuwirth, Larry Ehrlich

Ralph Stanley chronology
Shine On (2005)	A Distant Land to Roam: Songs of the Carter Family (2006)	Mountain Preacher's Child (2007)

Professional ratings
Review scores
Source	Rating
AllMusic	3.5/5 stars

A Distant Land to Roam: Songs of the Carter Family is an album by American country singer Ralph Stanley, released in 2006. It was produced by Bob Neuwirth and Larry Ehrlich. T Bone Burnett, who previously worked with Stanley on his eponymous 2002 album, served as the album's executive producer. It was nominated for the Grammy Award for Best Traditional Folk Album at the 49th Grammy Awards.

== Track listing ==
1. God Gave Noah the Rainbow Sign
2. Little Moses
3. Worried Man Blues
4. Longing for Home
5. Motherless Children
6. Storms Are on the Ocean
7. Keep on the Firing Line
8. Engine 143
9. I'm Thinking Tonight of My Blue Eyes
10. Poor Orphan Child
11. On a Hill Lone and Grey
12. Waves on the Sea
13. Distant Land to Roam
