= When the Roses Bloom in Dixieland: Their Complete Victor Recordings (1929–1930) =

Compilation album by Carter Family
- Released: October 31, 1995
- Recorded: 1929–1930
- Genre: Country, old-time, folk
- Length: 48:45
- Label: Rounder
- Producer: Ralph Peer

Carter Family chronology
My Clinch Mountain Home: Their Complete Victor Recordings (1928–1929) (1993)	When the Roses Bloom in Dixieland: Their Complete Victor Recordings (1929–1930) (1995)	Worried Man Blues: Their Complete Victor Recordings (1930) (1995)

When the Roses Bloom in Dixieland: Their Complete Victor Recordings (1929–1930) is a compilation of recordings made by American country music group the Carter Family, released in 1995. It is the third of nine compilations released by Rounder Records of the group's Victor recordings. The original Carter Family group consisting of Alvin Pleasant "A.P." Delaney Carter, his wife Sara Dougherty Carter, and his sister-in-law Maybelle Addington Carter recorded many of what would become their signature songs for Victor Records.

== History ==
Maybelle Carter began using a Gibson L-5 f-hole guitar in place of the smaller Stella she previously used, allowing her guitar more prominence. Her innovative guitar technique is today widely known as the "Carter scratch" or "Carter style" of picking (see Carter Family picking).

It has been noted that 'by the end of the twenties, Maybelle Carter scratch ... was the most widely imitated guitar style in music. Nobody did as much to popularize the guitar, because from the beginning, her playing was distinctive as any voice.'"

— quoted in The Bristol Sessions: Writings About the Big Bang of Country Music (2005)

In the early 1930s, A. P. Carter befriended Lesley "Esley" Riddle, a black guitar player from Kingsport, Tennessee. Esley accompanied A.P. on his song-collecting trips. Many songs, such as "Motherless Children" and "Wabash Cannonball" found here, were traditional folk songs that were copyrighted by A. P.

The tracks have all been digitally remastered and include liner notes by country music historian Charles K. Wolfe.

== Reception ==
In his No Depression review, critic Kels Koch stated, "What counts 65 years later is that these recordings — as crucial a patch in American music’s tapestry as any — are back in print to entertain and console yet another generation: ours." Larry Stephens (Country Standard Time) notes or the recordings "The uninitiated should not expect the polished sound of most of today's music, although technicians did a great job removing the hiss and scratchiness of the original recordings."

Professional ratings
Review scores
Source	Rating
Allmusic	5/5 stars
Country Standard Time	(Favorable)
No Depression	(Favorable)

== Track listing ==
All songs are credited to A. P. Carter.

1. "Motherless Children" – 3:35
2. "When the Roses Bloom in Dixieland" – 3:27
3. "No Telephone in Heaven" – 3:15
4. "The Western Hobo" – 2:54
5. "Carter's Blues" – 2:56
6. "Wabash Cannonball" – 2:55
7. "A Distant Land to Roam" – 2:57
8. "Jimmie Brown, the Newsboy" – 2:33
9. "Kitty Waltz" – 3:04
10. "Fond Affection" – 3:22
11. "The Cannonball" – 2:57
12. "Lover's Farewell" – 3:01
13. "There's Someone Awaiting for Me" – 3:07
14. "Little Log Hut in the Lane" – 2:50
15. "When the Springtime Comes Again" – 2:44
16. "When the World's on Fire" – 3:08

== Personnel ==
- A. P. Carter – vocals
- Maybelle Carter – vocals, guitar, autoharp
- Sara Carter – vocals, autoharp

Production notes:

- Ralph Peer – producer
- Dr. Toby Mountain – mastering
- Scott Billington – design, photography
- Charles K. Wolfe – liner notes
