= I'm Thinking Tonight of My Blue Eyes =

1935 single by the Carter Family

Single by Carter Family
- A-side: "Engine One-Forty-Three"
- Released: 1929
- Studio: Victor recording studio, Camden, New Jersey
- Genre: Country, American folk
- Label: Conqueror Records
- Songwriter: Traditional reworked by A. P. Carter

"I'm Thinking Tonight of My Blue Eyes" is a country/folk song adapted by A. P. Carter. A collector of traditional folk songs, Carter adapted it from "The Prisoner's Song," which had been recorded by Guy Massey in 1924. A foundation of early country music, the song was released in 1929. Lyrically, the song recounts the story of lovers separated as one sails upon the sea.

Due to the song's popularity and historical importance, many artists have covered the song, including Bing Crosby, Gene Autry, Burl Ives and The Andrews Sisters. Some artists shorten the title to Broken Ties or Broken Vows or Broken Hearted Lovers. In February 1939, on XET Station, Mexico, Sara Carter dedicated the song to Coy Bayes, a cousin of her husband A. P., with whom she had started a relationship, before he and his parents moved to California. Soon after, Carter and Bayes reconnected and were wed. The song features the Carter Family picking, which was pioneered by Mother Maybelle. The song was later put on the Carter Family album: My Clinch Mountain Home: Their Complete Victor Recordings (1928–1929). In 2006, Ralph Stanley recorded a complete album of Carter Family songs, which included "I'm Thinking Tonight of My Blue Eyes", titled A Distant Land to Roam: Songs of the Carter Family.

The melody of “I’m Thinking Tonight of My Blue Eyes" was used for Roy Acuff's "The Great Speckled Bird", Hank Thompson's "The Wild Side of Life," Kitty Wells' "It Wasn't God Who Made Honky Tonk Angels," and Jack Clement's "Flushed From the Bathroom of Your Heart," which was recorded by Johnny Cash on his 1968 album At Folsom Prison. The song became a hit all over again in these other incarnations.
