= Anchored in Love: Their Complete Victor Recordings (1927–1928) =

Compilation album by Carter Family
- Released: 1993
- Recorded: 1927–1928
- Genre: Country, old-time, folk
- Length: 48:44
- Label: Rounder
- Producer: Ralph Peer

Carter Family chronology
Anchored in Love: Their Complete Victor Recordings (1927–1928) (1993)	My Clinch Mountain Home: Their Complete Victor Recordings (1928–1929) (1993)

Anchored in Love: Their Complete Victor Recordings (1927–1928) is a compilation of recordings made by American country music group the Carter Family, released in 1993. It is the first of nine compilations released by Rounder Records of the group's Victor recordings.

== History ==
The original Carter Family group consisted of Alvin Pleasant "A.P." Delaney Carter, his wife Sara Dougherty Carter, and his sister-in-law Maybelle Addington Carter. All three were born and raised in southwestern Virginia, where they were immersed in the tight harmonies of mountain gospel music and shape note singing. A.P. traveled around the southwestern Virginia area in search of new songs, resulting in many traditional songs being copyrighted in his name.

In August 1927, the trio made the journey from Maces Spring, Virginia to Bristol, Tennessee to audition for record producer Ralph Peer who was seeking new talent for the relatively new recording industry. They received $50 for each song they recorded. Peer later had the group travel to Camden, New Jersey, where they recorded many of what would become their signature songs.

"They wandered in. He's dressed in overalls and the women are country women from way back there. They look like hillbillies. But as soon as I heard Sara's voice, that was it. I knew it was going to be wonderful!"

— - Ralph Peer

Although A. P. could play guitar and fiddle, and did so on their radio shows, he never played on their recordings.

The tracks have all been digitally remastered and include liner notes by country music historian Charles K. Wolfe.

== Reception ==
Professional ratings
Review scores
Source	Rating
Allmusic	5/5 stars
Entertainment Weekly	A

In his Allmusic review, critic Ron Wynn stated, "The Carter Family's sessions are seminal country music, raw and wonderfully unsophisticated with an emotional directness and honesty that makes a mockery of the slick, overproduced rock/folk now being marketed as country." Music critic Alana Nash stated, "When Sara lets loose with her straightforward, heavily accented soprano ("cwar" for choir), surely the angels in heaven take note."

== Track listing ==
All songs are credited to A. P. Carter unless otherwise noted.

1. "Keep On the Sunny Side" (Ada Blenkhorn, J. Howard Entwisle, A. P. Carter) – 2:54
2. "The Storms Are on the Ocean" – 2:50
3. "Wildwood Flower" (Maud Irving, Joseph Philbrick Webster, A. P. Carter) – 3:09
4. "Meet Me by the Moonlight Alone" (A. P. Carter, Sara Carter, Maybelle Carter) – 3:17
5. "The Wandering Boy" – 3:23
6. "River of Jordan" – 2:38
7. "I Ain't Goin' to Work Tomorrow" – 2:44
8. "Anchored in Love" – 3:24
9. "Little Darlin' Pal of Mine" – 3:16
10. "Bury Me Under the Weeping Willow" – 2:53
11. "Single Girl, Married Girl" (A.P. Carter, Tim Hauser, Laurel Masst, Alan Paul, Janis Siegel) – 2:50
12. "Little Log Cabin by the Sea" – 2:48
13. "Chewing Gum" – 3:04
14. "The Poor Orphan Child" – 3:24
15. "John Hardy Was a Desperate Little Man" – 2:55
16. "Will You Miss Me When I'm Gone?" – 3:15

== Personnel ==
- A. P. Carter – vocals
- Maybelle Carter – vocals, guitar, autoharp
- Sara Carter – vocals, autoharp

Production notes:

- Ralph Peer – producer
- Dr. Toby Mountain – mastering
- Scott Billington – design, photo imaging
- Charles K. Wolfe – liner notes, photography
