= My Clinch Mountain Home: Their Complete Victor Recordings (1928–1929) =

Compilation album by Carter Family
- Released: October 1, 1993
- Recorded: 1928–1929
- Genre: Country, old-time, folk
- Length: 48:11
- Label: Rounder
- Producer: Ralph Peer

Carter Family chronology
Anchored in Love: Their Complete Victor Recordings (1927–1928) (1993)	My Clinch Mountain Home: Their Complete Victor Recordings (1928–1929) (1993)	When the Roses Bloom in Dixieland: Their Complete Victor Recordings (1929–1930) (1995)

My Clinch Mountain Home: Their Complete Victor Recordings (1928–1929) is a compilation of recordings made by American country music group the Carter Family, released in 1993. It is the second of nine compilations released by Rounder Records of the group's Victor recordings.

== History ==
The original Carter Family group consisted of Alvin Pleasant "A.P." Delaney Carter, his wife Sara Dougherty Carter, and his sister-in-law Maybelle Addington Carter. A.P. traveled around the southwestern Virginia area in search of new songs, resulting in many traditional songs being copyrighted in his name. In 1927, the trio auditioned for record producer Ralph Peer and subsequently began their recording career with Victor.

The tracks have all been digitally remastered and include liner notes by country music historian Charles K. Wolfe.

== Reception ==
In his Allmusic review, critic Ron Wynn stated, "...the first two [reissues] only make you eager for more." Music critic Alana Nash stated, "When Sara lets loose with her straightforward, heavily accented soprano ("cwar" for choir), surely the angels in heaven take note."

Professional ratings
Review scores
Source	Rating
Allmusic	5/5 stars
Entertainment Weekly	(A)

== Track listing ==
All songs are credited to A. P. Carter unless otherwise noted.

1. "The Foggy Mountain Top" – 2:57
2. "Sweet Fern" – 3:07
3. "Bring Back My Blue Eyed Boy" – 3:18
4. "God Gave Noah the Rainbow Sign" – 3:02
5. "The Cyclone of Rye Cove" – 2:48
6. "My Clinch Mountain Home" (A. P. Carter, Sara Carter, Maybelle Carter) – 3:09
7. "Forsaken Love" – 2:58
8. "The Grave on the Green Hillside" – 2:43
9. "I'm Thinking Tonight of My Blue Eyes" (A. P. Carter, Don Marcotte) – 3:01
10. "Diamonds in the Rough" – 3:23
11. "Lulu Walls" – 2:50
12. "I Have No One to Love Me (But the Sailor on the Deep Blue Sea)" – 2:52
13. "Little Moses" – 3:11
14. "Engine 143" – 3:17
15. "Don't Forget This Song" – 2:44
16. "The Homestead on the Farm" – 2:43

== Personnel ==
- A. P. Carter – vocals
- Maybelle Carter – vocals, guitar, autoharp
- Sara Carter – vocals, autoharp

Production notes:

- Ralph Peer – producer
- Dr. Toby Mountain – mastering
- Scott Billington – design, photography
- Charles K. Wolfe – liner notes
