= Longing for Old Virginia: Their Complete Victor Recordings (1934) =

Compilation album by Carter Family
- Released: April 7, 1998
- Genre: Country, old-time, folk
- Length: 51:48
- Label: Rounder
- Producer: Ralph Peer

Carter Family chronology
Gold Watch and Chain: Their Complete Victor Recordings (1933–1934) (1998)	Longing for Old Virginia: Their Complete Victor Recordings (1934) (1998)	Last Sessions: Their Complete Victor Recordings (1934–1941) (1998)

Longing for Old Virginia: Their Complete Victor Recordings (1934) is a compilation of recordings made by American country music group the Carter Family, released in 1998. It is the eighth of nine compilations released by Rounder Records of the group's Victor recordings. The original Carter Family group consisting of Alvin Pleasant "A.P." Delaney Carter, his wife Sara Dougherty Carter, and his sister-in-law Maybelle Addington Carter recorded many of what would become their signature songs for Victor Records.

The tracks have all been digitally remastered and include liner notes by country music historian Charles K. Wolfe.

== Reception ==
In his Allmusic review, music critic Jim Smith said the release "... may not be the definitive Carter Family material, but they are all outstanding... Consistently enjoyable listening." Kels Koch called it "Pure as a mountain stream and heartfelt as the day is long, these vintage performances encompass the evolution of an American songwriting tradition at its finest. From gospel to vaudeville to bluegrass, the roots of the Carter Family run deep and wide." In his Country Standard Time review, critic Roy Kasten states "Like the preceding volume, most selections here are not the stuff of Greatest Hits, and for that they're especially worth savoring. Like the other seven volumes, these last CDs are essential to any country music lover's collection."

Professional ratings
Review scores
Source	Rating
Allmusic	4.5/5 stars
Country Standard Time	(Favorable)
No Depression	(Favorable)

== Track listing ==
All songs are credited to A. P. Carter.

1. "Darling Daisies" – 2:58
2. "East Virginia Blues" – 2:44
3. "Lover's Return" – 3:04
4. "It'll Aggravate Your Soul" – 3:26
5. "Hello Central, Give Me Heaven" – 3:31
6. "I'm Working on a Building" – 2:41
7. "On a Hill Lone and Gray" – 2:33
8. "You've Been Fooling Me, Baby" – 2:57
9. "Longing for Old Virginia" – 2:58
10. "March Winds Gonna Blow My Blues All Away" – 2:43
11. "There'll Be Joy, Joy, Joy" – 2:45
12. "Home in Tennessee" – 2:32
13. "Are You Tired of Me, My Darling?" – 2:52
14. "I Cannot Be Your Sweetheart" – 2:56
15. "My Heart's Tonight in Texas" – 2:44
16. "There's No Hiding Place Down Here" – 2:53
17. "The Cowboy's Wild Song to His Herd" – 2:24
18. "The Evening Bells Are Ringing" – 3:07

== Personnel ==
- A. P. Carter – vocals
- Maybelle Carter – vocals, guitar, autoharp
- Sara Carter – vocals, autoharp

Production notes:

- Ralph Peer – producer
- David Glasser – mastering
- Scott Billington – design
- Charles K. Wolfe – liner notes
