= Worried Man Blues: Their Complete Victor Recordings (1930) =

Compilation album by Carter Family
- Released: 1995
- Genre: Country, old-time, folk
- Length: 44:12
- Label: Rounder
- Producer: Ralph Peer

Carter Family chronology
When the Roses Bloom in Dixieland: Their Complete Victor Recordings (1929–1930) (1995)	Worried Man Blues: Their Complete Victor Recordings (1930) (1995)	Sunshine in the Shadows: Their Complete Victor Recordings (1931–1932) (1996)

Worried Man Blues: Their Complete Victor Recordings (1930) is a compilation of recordings made by American country music group the Carter Family, released in 1995. It is the fourth of nine compilations released by Rounder Records of the group's Victor recordings.

== History ==
The original Carter Family group consisted of Alvin Pleasant "A.P." Delaney Carter, his wife Sara Dougherty Carter, and his sister-in-law Maybelle Addington Carter. A.P. traveled around the southwestern Virginia area in search of new songs, resulting in many traditional songs being copyrighted in his name. In 1927, the trio auditioned for record producer Ralph Peer and subsequently began their recording career with Victor.

By the end of 1930 the trio had sold 300,000 records in the U.S.

The tracks have all been digitally remastered.

== Reception ==
In his No Depression review, critic Kels Koch stated, "What counts 65 years later is that these recordings — as crucial a patch in American music’s tapestry as any — are back in print to entertain and console yet another generation: ours." Larry Stephens stated in his Country Standard Time review, "The 1930 songs feature an unusual amount of trio work along with some of the Carters' more standard duets. While all songs are credited to A. P., many were in fact written and even recorded earlier by others. Many came from A. P. 's song hunting trips into the mountains. Be prepared for a lot of repetition in sound. Given they only used two instruments and no special effects, there is certain to be a sameness."

Professional ratings
Review scores
Source	Rating
Allmusic	5/5 stars
Country Standard Time	(Favorable)
No Depression	(Favorable)

== Track listing ==
All songs are credited to A. P. Carter unless otherwise noted.

1. "I Have an Aged Mother" – 3:20
2. "The Dying Soldier" – 3:02
3. "Worried Man Blues" – 2:43
4. "Lonesome Valley" – 2:38
5. "On the Rock Where Moses Stood" (A. P. Carter, Sara Carter, Maybelle Carter) – 3:07
6. "Room in Heaven for Me" – 2:49
7. "Lonesome Pine Special" – 2:58
8. "No More the Moon Shines on Lorena" – 3:02
9. "On My Way to Canaan's Land" – 3:03
10. "Where Shall I Be?" – 2:51
11. "Sow 'Em on the Mountain" – 2:51
12. "Darling Nellie Across the Sea" – 2:46
13. "The Birds Were Singing of You" – 3:05
14. "Weary Prodigal Son" – 2:39
15. "My Old Cottage Home" – 2:55
16. "When I'm Gone" – 3:02

== Personnel ==
- A. P. Carter – vocals
- Maybelle Carter – vocals, guitar, autoharp
- Sara Carter – vocals, autoharp

Production notes:

- Ralph Peer – producer
- Wulfing von Rohr – producer
- Jim Oliver – producer, liner notes
- Dr. Toby Mountain – mastering
- Scott Billington – design
- Charles K. Wolfe – liner notes, photography
- Boris Mourashkin – liner notes
- Dr. Jeffrey D. Thompson – liner notes
