= Gold Watch and Chain: Their Complete Victor Recordings (1933–1934) =

1998 compilation album by Carter Family

Compilation album by Carter Family
- Released: February 10, 1998
- Recorded: June 1933 – May 1934
- Genre: Country, old-time, folk
- Length: 48:12
- Label: Rounder
- Producer: Ralph Peer

Carter Family chronology
Give Me the Roses While I Live: Their Complete Victor Recordings (1932–1933) (1997)	Gold Watch and Chain: Their Complete Victor Recordings (1933–1934) (1998)	Longing for Old Virginia: Their Complete Victor Recordings (1934) (1998)

Gold Watch and Chain: Their Complete Victor Recordings (1933–1934) is a compilation of recordings made by American country music group the Carter Family, released in 1998. It is the seventh of nine compilations released by Rounder Records of the group's Victor recordings. The original Carter Family group consisting of Alvin Pleasant "A.P." Delaney Carter, his wife Sara Dougherty Carter, and his sister-in-law Maybelle Addington Carter recorded many of what would become their signature songs for Victor Records.

Emmylou Harris covered "Gold Watch and Chain" on her 1980 album Roses in the Snow.

The tracks have all been digitally remastered and include liner notes by country music historian Charles K. Wolfe.

== Reception ==
Music critic William Ruhlman stated in his Allmusic review "... the Carters' usual combination of hymns, traditional folk songs, and other old material continues to fascinate in their renditions, with their rough, expressive singing and innovative playing."

Professional ratings
Review scores
Source	Rating
Allmusic	4/5 stars

== Track listing ==
1. "When the Roses Come Again" (A. W. Finch, G. W. Persley) – 2:29
2. "I Loved You Better Than You Knew" (Johnny Carroll) – 3:08
3. "This Is Like Heaven to Me" (J. E. French) – 2:43
4. "See That My Grave Is Kept Clean" (Blind Lemon Jefferson, Gus Williams) – 3:13
5. "Over the Garden Wall" (George D. Fox, Harry Hunter) – 2:51
6. "Gold Watch and Chain" (Thomas P. Westendorf) – 3:33
7. "School House on the Hill" (Aldine Kieffer) – 2:57
8. "Will My Mother Know Me There?" (William M Golden, Johnson Oatman, Jr.) – 3:03
9. "Faded Flowers" (J. H. Brown, James Power) – 3:08
10. "Poor Little Orphaned Boy" (A. P. Carter) – 3:23
11. "Cowboy Jack" (Carter) – 2:55
12. "I'll Be All Smiles Tonight" (Carter) – 3:15
13. "Away Out on the Saint Sabbath" (Carter) – 3:00
14. "Darling Little Joe" (Charles E. Addison) – 2:47
15. "Happy or Lonesome" (Traditional) – 2:48
16. "One Little Word" (Gussie Davis) – 2:59

== Personnel ==
- A. P. Carter – vocals
- Maybelle Carter – vocals, guitar, autoharp
- Sara Carter – vocals, autoharp

Production notes:

- Ralph Peer – producer
- David Glasser – mastering
- Scott Billington – design
- Charles K. Wolfe – liner notes
