= Sunshine in the Shadows: Their Complete Victor Recordings (1931–1932) =

Compilation album by Carter Family
- Released: 1996
- Recorded: 1931–1932 in Louisville, Kentucky and Atlanta, Georgia
- Genre: Country, old-time, folk
- Length: 47:28
- Label: Rounder
- Producer: Ralph Peer

Carter Family chronology
Worried Man Blues: Their Complete Victor Recordings (1930) (1995)	Sunshine in the Shadows: Their Complete Victor Recordings (1931–1932) (1996)	Give Me the Roses While I Live: Their Complete Victor Recordings (1932–1933) (1997)

Sunshine in the Shadows: Their Complete Victor Recordings (1931–1932) is a compilation of recordings made by American country music group the Carter Family, released in 1996. It is the fifth of nine compilations released by Rounder Records of the group's Victor recordings. The original Carter Family group consisting of Alvin Pleasant "A.P." Delaney Carter, his wife Sara Dougherty Carter, and his sister-in-law Maybelle Addington Carter recorded many of what would become their signature songs for Victor Records.

== History ==
Recorded during the Great Depression, the Carters were paired with country singer Jimmie Rodgers in order to boost record sales. The two duets with Sara and the spoken word sketches featuring Rodgers were recorded in Louisville, Kentucky.

The tracks have all been digitally remastered and include liner notes by country music historian Charles K. Wolfe.

== Reception ==
In his Allmusic review, music critic Richie Unterberger stated the reissue "...displays the Carters' usual unadorned consistency, moving harmonies, and accomplished picking..." Kels Koch, in his review for No Depression saying the recordings "... served to comfort the shivering and hungry masses.." also concludes that "Six decades later, the stilted dialogue and Rodgers’ tendency to punctuate every sentence with his trademark yodel make for recordings that are at once ridiculous and endearing, not to mention historically invaluable."

Professional ratings
Review scores
Source	Rating
Allmusic	5/5 stars
No Depression	(Favorable)

== Track listing ==
All songs are credited to A. P. Carter unless otherwise noted.

1. "Sunshine in the Shadows" (A. P. Carter, Traditional) – 2:46
2. "Let the Church Roll On" – 2:41
3. "Lonesome for You" – 2:46
4. "Can't Feel at Home" (Carter, Traditional) – 2:53
5. "Why There's a Tear in My Eye" – 3:08
6. "The Wonderful City" (Jimmie Rodgers, Elsie McWilliams) – 2:55
7. "Jimmie Rodgers Visits the Carter Family" – 3:16
8. "The Carter Family and Jimmie Rodgers in Texas" (Rodgers) – 3:16
9. "'Mid the Green Fields of Virginia" (Carter, Charles K. Harris) – 2:46
10. "The Happiest Days of All" (Carter, Will L. Thompson) – 3:14
11. "Picture on the Wall" (Bud Landress, Charles E. Moody) – 3:17
12. "Amber Tresses" – 2:46
13. "I Never Loved But One" – 2:53
14. "Tell Me That You Love Me" (Carter, Will S. Hays) – 3:02
15. "Where We'll Never Grow Old" (Carter, James Cleveland) – 3:01
16. "We Will March Through the Streets of the City" – 2:48

== Personnel ==
- A. P. Carter – vocals
- Maybelle Carter – vocals, guitar, autoharp
- Sara Carter – vocals, autoharp
- Jimmie Rodgers – vocals

Production notes:

- Ralph Peer – producer
- David Glasser – mastering
- Scott Billington – design
- Charles K. Wolfe – liner notes, photography
