= Give Me the Roses While I Live: Their Complete Victor Recordings (1932–1933) =

Compilation album by Carter Family
- Released: February 11, 1997
- Recorded: 1932–1933 in Camden, New Jersey
- Genre: Country, old-time, folk
- Length: 41:48
- Label: Rounder
- Producer: Ralph Peer

Carter Family chronology
Sunshine in the Shadows: Their Complete Victor Recordings (1931–1932) (1996)	Give Me the Roses While I Live: Their Complete Victor Recordings (1932–1933) (1997)	Gold Watch and Chain: Their Complete Victor Recordings (1933–1934) (1998)

Give Me the Roses While I Live: Their Complete Victor Recordings (1932–1933) is a compilation of recordings made by American country music group the Carter Family, released in 1997. It is the sixth of nine compilations released by Rounder Records of the group's Victor recordings. The original Carter Family group consisting of Alvin Pleasant "A.P." Delaney Carter, his wife Sara Dougherty Carter, and his sister-in-law Maybelle Addington Carter recorded many of what would become their signature songs for Victor Records.

== History ==
By the time of the recording sessions that produced the songs for this collection, the Carter Family was one of the top entertainment acts in the United States. Despite the Depression, their records and concerts still provided income, but after six years of recording and performing professionally, personal issues began to affect the group in the shape of A. P. and Sara's separation. Although the group continued professionally, their marriage was over and Sara would eventually remarry.

The recordings were done in Camden, New Jersey in two separate sessions. Slightly more than half of these were released and the original version of "Can the Circle Be Unbroken (By and By)" recorded in one of the sessions was never released by Victor.

The tracks have all been digitally remastered and include liner notes by country music historian Charles K. Wolfe.

== Reception ==
Music critic Kels Koch stated "... this is as definitive a collection of Carter recordings as one could wish for." David Nestlerode wrote for The Folk and Acoustic Music Exchange: "...the Carter Family's recordings are historic. This trio from Clinch Mountain changed the orientation of hillbilly music from instrumental to vocal, introduced a new style of guitar playing (created by Maybelle Carter), and brought it to mainstream audiences in the United States. The Carter Family's accomplishments allowed artists like Jimmie Rodgers to come along and help invent country and western music." In his Country Standard Time review, critic Roy Kasten called Sara's singing "... dazzlingly emotive, the heart of the trio." and wrote "The songs tell of faded or betrayed love, and often spiritual wonder and sustenance ("Will the Roses Bloom in Heaven" and "The Sun of the Soul"). .. despite the turmoil of their private lives, the trio's harmonies never sounded better."

Professional ratings
Review scores
Source	Rating
Allmusic	3/5 stars
Country Standard Time	(Favorable)
No Depression	(Favorable)

== Track listing ==
All songs are credited to A. P. Carter unless otherwise noted.

1. "Sweet as the Flowers in May Time" – 2:44
2. "Will the Roses Bloom in Heaven" – 3:18
3. "My Little Home in Tennessee" – 2:56
4. "The Sun of the Soul" – 3:17
5. "If One Won't Another One Will" – 3:08
6. "The Broken Hearted Lover" – 2:51
7. "Two Sweethearts" – 2:49
8. "The Winding Stream" – 3:05
9. "I Wouldn't Mind Dying" – 2:54
10. "The Spirit of Love Watches Over Me" – 2:46
11. "The Church in the Wildwood" – 3:11
12. "Give Me Roses While I Live" (Cornelius) – 3:03
13. "I Never Will Marry" (Traditional) – 2:37
14. "On the Sea of Galilee" – 3:09
15. "Home by the Sea" (Traditional) – 3:28

== Personnel ==
- A. P. Carter – vocals
- Maybelle Carter – vocals, guitar, autoharp
- Sara Carter – vocals, autoharp

Production notes:

- Ralph Peer – producer
- David Glasser – mastering
- Scott Billington – design
- Charles K. Wolfe – liner notes
