= Shine On (Ralph Stanley album) =

Studio album by Ralph Stanley
- Released: 2005
- Genre: Bluegrass, country
- Label: Rebel Records
- Producer: Ralph Stanley II

Shine On is a 2005 album by American bluegrass artist Ralph Stanley.

== Track listing ==
1. "King of All Kings"
2. "The Roses Will Bloom"
3. "The Old Church Yard"
4. "This Little Light of Mine"
5. "My Main Trial Is Yet To Come"
6. "Sing Songs About Jesus"
7. "Palms of Victory"
8. "On a High, High Mountain"
9. "The Lowest Valley"
10. "Swing Low, Sweet Chariot"
11. "I'll Fly Away"
12. "Shine On"
13. "Why Should We Start and Fear to Die"
14. "Let Your Light Shine Out"

== Awards ==
The album was nominated for a Dove Award for Bluegrass Album of the Year at the 37th GMA Dove Awards.
