= Engine One-Forty-Three =

Song performed by Johnny Cash

"Engine One-Forty-Three" (Roud 255) is a folk ballad in the tradition of Anglo-American train wreck songs. It is based on the true story of the wreck of the Chesapeake and Ohio Railway's Fast Flying Virginian (FFV) near Hinton, West Virginia in 1890.

The song's earliest documented appearance was in Railroad Man Magazine in 1913 as "The Wreck on the C. & O.", while its earliest recording was in 1924. The first use of the title "Engine One-Forty-Three" was for a recording by the Carter Family in 1929, which became one of the group's best-selling records and the basis for many subsequent recordings.

== The wreck and the song ==
The FFV, the Chesapeake & Ohio's luxury passenger train, was heading east to Washington, D.C. in the early morning of 23 October 1890 when it struck a rockslide three miles outside Hinton in Summers County, West Virginia. The train's 30-year-old engineer George Alley tried to stop, but the engine overturned, and he was trapped in the wreckage. Severely scalded, Alley died five hours later. His two firemen, both of whom leapt from the engine, were also scalded but survived. Remarkably, no passengers were injured.

Apart from the basic story, the song deviates widely from the facts associated with the accident. For example, Alley's mother did not come to his side as he was dying (she had died years earlier); Alley's hair was black, not blonde; the train's fireman had no part in causing the crash; and among other differences, the engine's number was 134, not 143. Meanwhile, there is no evidence Alley was speeding to make up lost time. In fact, the young engineer, whose father and four brothers all worked for the C. & O., was hailed a hero for his attempt to prevent the crash.

== Recordings ==
Gene Austin, an early crooner, was the first to record the song in 1924, under the title "The C. & O. Wreck", and several other versions were recorded in the next few years under different titles. On February 15, 1929, The Carter Family recorded the song as "Engine One-Forty-Three" with A.P. Carter credited as songwriter. The Carters' release on the Victor label sold more than 88,000 copies, while their Montgomery Ward release accounted for another 5,000 in sales.

Over the years, variations of the song, most based on the Carter Family version, have been recorded by dozens of artists, including the Kossoy Sisters, Dave Alvin, Joan Baez, Norman Blake, Ramblin' Jack Elliott, Lester Flatt & Earl Scruggs, David Grisman, Roger Miller, Michael Nesmith, Ralph Stanley, Townes Van Zandt, and Doc Watson.

"Engine One-Forty-Three" was the last song to be recorded by country music singer Johnny Cash. Cash recorded the song on August 21, 2003, 23 days before his death. It was released the next year on the tribute album The Unbroken Circle: The Musical Heritage of the Carter Family.

Folk singer Dave Van Ronk recorded a parody of "Engine One-Forty-Three" in 1960 under the title "Georgie and the IRT". The song's lyrics, written by crime writer Lawrence Block, poked fun at New York City's subway system.

== Lyrics ==
The song has appeared under many titles, including "Wreck of the C. & O.", "The F.F.V.", "George Allen", and "The C. & O. Wreck". Meanwhile, Carson J. Robison's "The Wreck of the C&O No. 5" recounts a much later crash on the Chesapeake & Ohio Railroad, one that occurred in 1920. The following examples show the differences and similarities in the opening stanzas of "Engine One-Forty-Three" and its variants.

=== "The Wreck on the C. and O." ===
The earliest known account of the song dates to 1913, though there is evidence of earlier versions.

Along came the F.F.V., the fastest on the line,
A running on the C. and O. road, thirty minutes behind time.
As she passed the Sewalls it was quarters on the line;
And they received new orders to make up some lost time.

Chorus:

Many man's been murdered by the railroad, railroad,
Many man's been murdered by the railroad and lain in his
lonesome grave.

When she arrived at Hinton the engineer was there
His name was Georgie Alley, with bright and golden hair,
His fireman, Jackie Dickerson, was standing by his side,
Waiting to get orders, both in the cab to ride.

— Railroad Man Magazine, 1913

=== "Wreck on the C. & O. Railroad at Clifton's Ford, Va." ===
An undated broadside of the song remains true to the 1913 version, except the engineer's last name is Allen and the crash site is in Virginia.

Along came the F.F.V., the fastest on the line,
Running over the C. & O. Road, twenty minutes behind,
And when they got to Hinton, they quartered on the line
Awaiting for strict orders for the crew so far behind.

When they got to Hinton the engineer was there,
George Allen was the young man's name with light and curly hair,
His Faithful fireman Jack Dickerson was standing by his side,
Waiting for the local train in a cab for two to ride.

Chorus:

There's many a man been killed by the R.R.
Many a man been murdered by the train.
There's many a man killed by the R.R.
And sleeping in his lonesome grave.

— Broadside, sung by Billy Briscoe

=== "Engine One-Forty-Three" ===
The song, as recorded by the Carter Family in 1929, was based on lyrics written down by A.P. Carter, though his source is unknown. In Carter's version, the engineer is George Allen and the fireman, Jack Dixon. The F.F.V. actually had two firemen that day, Lewis Withrow and Robert Foster. A third fireman, Jack Dickinson, was aboard but was not on duty.

Along came the FFV, the swiftest on the line
Running o'er the C&O road just 20 minutes behind
Running into Seville headquarters on the line
Receiving their strict orders from the station just behind

Running into Hampton, the engineer was there
George Allen was his name, with curling golden hair
His fireman, Jack Dixon, was standing by his side
Awaiting for strict orders while in the cab to ride

— Carter Family, 1929

== Bibliography ==
- Cohen, Norm (2000). Long Steel Rail: The Railroad in American Folksong (2nd ed.). Urbana and Chicago: University of Illinois Press. ISBN 0-252-06881-5.
- Cox, John Harrington, ed. (2001) [1925]. Folk-Songs of the South. Cambridge, Massachusetts: Harvard University Press. ISBN 9780674012615.
- Lyle, Katie Letcher (1985). Scalded to Death by the Steam. London: W. H. Allen & Co. ISBN 0-491-03354-0.

== See also ==
- List of train songs
