= Last Sessions (The Carter Family album) =

Last Sessions: Their Complete Victor Recordings (1934–1941)

Compilation album by Carter Family
- Released: April 7, 1998
- Genre: Country, old-time, folk
- Length: 45:23
- Label: Rounder
- Producer: Ralph Peer

Carter Family chronology
| Longing for Old Virginia: Their Complete Victor Recordings (1934) (1998) | Last Sessions: Their Complete Victor Recordings (1934–1941) (1998) |

Last Sessions: Their Complete Victor Recordings (1934–1941) is a compilation of recordings made by American country music group the Carter Family, released in 1998. It is the final of nine compilations released by Rounder Records of the group's Victor recordings. The original Carter Family group consisting of Alvin Pleasant "A.P." Delaney Carter, his wife Sara Dougherty Carter, and his sister-in-law Maybelle Addington Carter recorded many of what would become their signature songs for Victor Records.

Following their final recordings for Victor, the Carter Family signed with Decca Records. They recorded over 60 songs in the first two years of their new contract.

The tracks have all been digitally remastered and include liner notes by country music historian Charles K. Wolfe.

== Reception ==
In his Allmusic review, music critic Tim Sheridan said the release "The material is terrific as usual, though some tracks sound a bit flat in the delivery... Not the best of the Carter Family recordings, but certainly great." Sheridan also mistakenly refers to Sara and Maybelle as "the daughters". Kels Koch stated "The Last Sessions disc showcases both the mature songwriting and interpretive talents of all three Carters." Roy Kasten stated in his Country Standard Time review, "These last sessions contain some of the family's most blues based work, with songs like "Something Got a Hold On Me," "Lonesome Homesick Blues," and "You're Gonna Be Sorry You Let Me Down." The last two show Maybelle Carter's growing confidence with a lyric, and point in the direction her career would take."

Professional ratings
Review scores
| Source | Rating |
|---|---|
| Allmusic | 4.5/5 stars |
| Country Standard Time | (Favorable) |
| No Depression | (Favorable) |

== Track listing ==
All songs are credited to A. P. Carter unless otherwise noted.

1. "I'll Be Home Someday" – 2:30
2. "Faded Coat of Blue" – 3:10
3. "Sailor Boy" – 3:11
4. "Why Do You Cry, Little Darling" – 3:09
5. "You Tied a Love Knot in My Heart" – 2:48
6. "Lonesome Homesick Blues" (Maybelle Carter) – 2:31
7. "Dark and Stormy Weather" – 2:28
8. "In the Valley of the Shenandoah" – 2:46
9. "Girl on the Greenbrier Shore" – 2:58
10. "Something Got a Hold of Me" – 2:47
11. "Fifty Miles of Elbow Room" – 2:49
12. "Keep on the Firing Line" – 3:04
13. "Waves on the Sea" – 2:41
14. "Rambling Boy" (A. P. Carter, Traditional) – 2:55
15. "You're Gonna Be Sorry You Let Me Down" – 2:48
16. "The Mountains of Tennessee" – 2:48

== Personnel ==
- A. P. Carter – vocals
- Maybelle Carter – vocals, guitar, autoharp
- Sara Carter – vocals, autoharp

Production notes:

- Ralph Peer – producer
- David Glasser – mastering
- Scott Billington – design
- Charles K. Wolfe – liner notes
