= Lulu Walls =

Lulu Walls, Lulu Wall, Lula Walls, or Lulu Walsh is a traditional 19th-century parlor song. Although often attributed to A. P. Carter, who collected and recorded it with the Carter Family, the song is much earlier. Other than being recorded twice before the Carter Family, and once by songwriter John Prine, the song was first written down in the 1887 Wehman's Universal Songster.
