= The Last Sessions (Sonny Stitt album) =

Studio album by Sonny Stitt
- Released: 1984
- Genre: Jazz
- Label: Muse

Sonny Stitt chronology
Just in Case You Forgot How Bad He Really Was (1981)	The Last Sessions (1984)

The Last Sessions is a two-volume album by Sonny Stitt. Recorded six weeks before he died, this was his last full album.
