= Carter Family picking =

Style of fingerstyle guitar

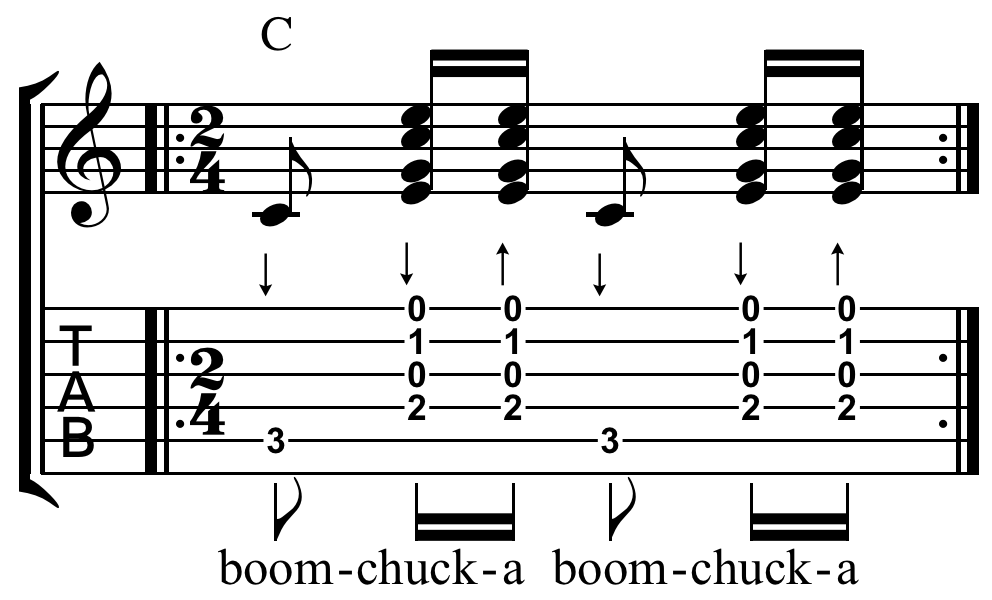
Carter-style lick.

Carter Family picking, also known as the thumb brush, the Carter lick, the church lick, or the Carter scratch, is a style of fingerstyle guitar named after Maybelle Carter of the Carter Family. It is a distinctive style of rhythm guitar in which the melody is played on the bass strings, usually low E, A, and D while rhythm strumming continues above, on the treble strings, G, B, and high E. This often occurs during the break. The style bears similarity to the frailing style of banjo playing and is the rhythm Bill Monroe adapted for bluegrass music two decades later.

With this technique, Carter, who "was among the first" to use it, "helped to turn the guitar into a lead instrument". It is unclear how Maybelle developed her style.

The Carter scratch can be heard on the Carter Family's first recordings, from their first session in Bristol, Tennessee on August 1, 1927. Maybelle also learned a blues fingerpicking technique from Lesley Riddle, an African-American guitarist who met A. P. Carter in December 1928 and who used to frequent the Carter family household. Carter can be heard playing in this style on a number of Carter Family recordings. She also played slide guitar and, later, with a flat-pick.

Walking bass provided by bass notes, stepwise motion in blue.

== Origin ==
The earliest origins of the Carter scratch style of guitar picking are unknown although it is rooted in the music of Appalachia and the American South. The style rose to prominence with the Carter Family, who became popular after their 1927 Bristol Sessions Recordings. Maybelle Carter both sang and provided instrumentation in the group, playing guitar, banjo, and autoharp. Maybelle learned to play the guitar at the age of thirteen by ear, never reading sheet music. She relied on the example of her brothers and mother to learn playing techniques and traditional folk songs. In the 1920s and 1930s, guitar was not yet a popular instrument in folk or country music. Maybelle recalled that "there weren't many guitar players around. I just played the way I wanted to, and that's it." Maybelle's guitar style has been characterized by archivist and musician Mike Seeger as having a "fluid, flowing, rhythmic sound, a way of playing the melody that… brought you in because it had rhythm and life to it." One student of Maybelle, Ruby Parker, commented on her guitar picking, stating that "She could make that guitar talk to you."

Among her many inspirations, Maybelle recalls that she was heavily influenced by traditional Baptist hymns as well as gospel music heard at Holiness revivals. Additionally, Maybelle listened to the radio and phonograph records and attended local music jams, "anything to get a little something different," she said. She credits Lesley Riddle, an African American musician, as a later influence on her style. Riddle first met Carter Family member A. P. Carter in the winter of 1928 after which he would accompany him on his song-collecting trips and was known for his ability to recall and reproduce tunes. For several years, Riddle and the Carters spent a lot of time together, learning new songs and perfecting their technique. Riddle remembered that for all his visits with the family, he rarely heard the Carters play for him: "They never sang for me. I'd have to do all the picking and singing." Instead, the Carters, Maybelle especially, attentively watched and listened to Riddle picking the blues for hours. But Riddle recollected that "You don't have to give Maybelle any lessons. You let her see you playing something, she'll get it. You better believe it." Riddle is credited with teaching Maybelle and the Carters one of their famous tunes, "Cannon Ball Blues."

Several songs highlight Maybelle's signature guitar style. "Single Girl, Married Girl", one of their most popular early recordings, illustrates the "innovation, versatility, and breadth" of the Carter Family's work. "Wildwood Flower" is perhaps the most famous song of the Carter's that includes Maybelle's unique style. Since its recording, it has become a key piece learned by countless fledgling guitarists.

== Technique ==
Maybelle's daughter June Carter Cash remembered her mother's playing technique this way:

"She'd hook that right thumb under that big bass string, and just like magic the other fingers moved fast like a threshing machine, always on the right strings, and out came the lead notes and the accompaniment at the same time. The left hand worked in perfect timing, and the frets seemed to pull those nimble fingers to the very place where they were supposed to be, and the guitar rang clear and sweet with a mellow touch that made you know it was Maybelle playing the guitar."

The Carter Family's music is usually played in 4/4 time and is "slightly uptempo". The Carter scratch, also known as the Carter lick, church lick or thumb brush technique, is based on old banjo frailing style. Flatpicking expert Eric Thompson stated that Maybelle's style "smoothly combines rhythm and lead playing, the two intertwining to form a nicely melodious coherent whole." The style mimics the rhythm of African American music including jazz and bluegrass with its steady upbeat, also known as a backbeat. Maybelle often played in the keys of C and F, which she tuned down to remain in C for a more comfortable singing register. A few songs, including "Lonesome Homesick Blues" and "Coal Miner’s Blues", were dropped to D where the low E-string is tuned to a D.

In addition to her iconic Carter scratch, Maybelle played in several other styles, one of which was played on the steel guitar. Mike Seeger, archivist and member of the New Lost City Ramblers, described her famous Carter scratch in detail:

"She plays the melody mostly on the three bass strings, although she does sometimes go to the third and second strings. She plays in a four-pattern measure. She would play on the one count with her thumb downward, and then she would brush upward with her first finger on the treble strings. Then down on the third count, brushing with her first finger, and up with her first finger on the fourth count."

== Legacy ==
The Carter scratch, and more generally Maybelle Carter, have had a great impact on multiple genres of music including country, folk, rock, and bluegrass. Maybelle's guitar style has been widely copied and is credited with "transform[ing] the instrument from background rhythm to the dominant lead sound in pop culture." The Carter's music bridged the gap between traditional, Appalachian folk music and new "hillbilly music", which would evolve into country music. For her contribution to country music, Maybelle was the first woman inducted into the Country Music Hall of Fame.

In the 1960s when folk music grew in popularity, Maybelle's picking style was resurrected. Until this time, Maybelle did not realize the significance of her music, stating that she was "just playing the way I wanted to and that's it." Maybelle was "proud and happy" that her style had become influential in folk and country music because it would keep the genre alive. In 1962, Maybelle played with bluegrass star Earl Scruggs, who grew frustrated that he could not reproduce her distinctive style, yet Maybelle picked it effortlessly in the studio for him. That same year, Maybelle accompanied the New Lost City Ramblers to the Newport Folk Festival, where she led workshops to teach young musicians the Carter scratch. Maybelle also played with the Nitty Gritty Dirt Band, who admired her musical aptitude, on their famous album Will the Circle Be Unbroken. John McEuen, founding member of the band, remarked that Maybelle "took the guitar and she used it in a way that nobody had thought of before."

Maybelle's great niece Rita Forrester once remarked that "I'm sure that anybody who has ever played a guitar has used something of Aunt Maybelle's—they've had to. There's no question in my mind…it would have been hard for [anyone] not to be touched by the way she played." Many folk and country artists acknowledge Maybelle's influence on their music including: Perry Como, Doc Watson, Chet Atkins, Elvis Presley, Bob Dylan, Marty Stuart, Emmylou Harris, Woody Guthrie, Earl Scruggs, Bill Monroe, and Johnny Cash. Doc Watson learned the Carter scratch as a boy and adapted it into his own flatpicking style, which was influential in its own right. Woody Guthrie based his most famous song "This Land is Your Land" on Maybelle's lick as well.

== See also ==
- "Wildwood Flower", a traditional song adapted by the Carter Family and first recorded in the 1920s. Maybelle Carter's use of the "Carter Scratch" on this recording and later performances is one of the best-known and widely emulated examples of this form of playing.
- Flatpicking
- Bass run
- Clawhammer
- Walking bass
- Lick (music)
- Oom-pah
