= Wildwood Flower =

American song

Song
- Published: 1860
- Composer: Joseph Philbrick Webster
- Lyricist: Maud Irving

"Wildwood Flower" played on a guitalin
Finger picking style

"Wildwood Flower" (or "The Wildwood Flower") is an American song, best known through performances and recordings by the Carter Family. It is a folk song, cataloged as Roud Folk Song Index No. 757.

== History ==
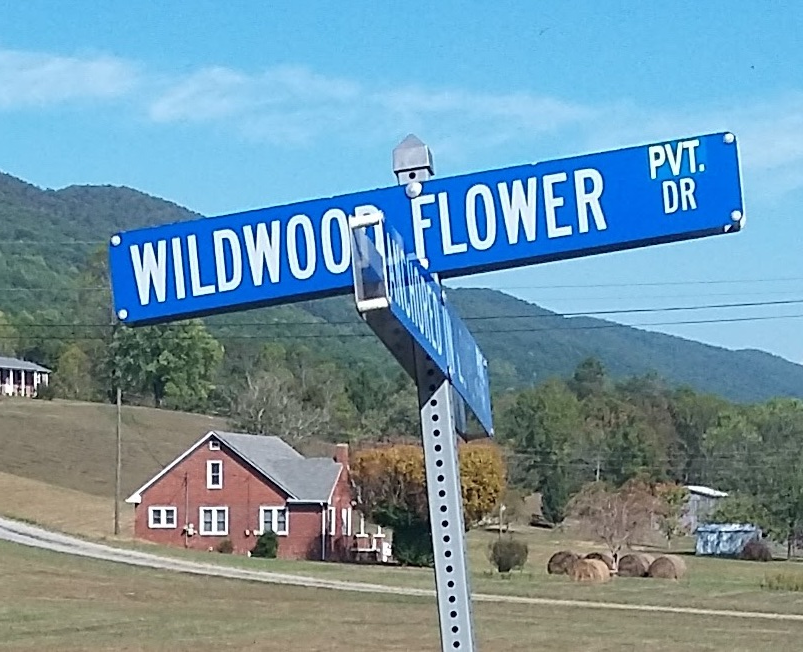
Wildwood Flower Drive at the Carter Family Fold at Maces Springs, Virginia now Hiltons, Virginia. The Drive is named after the Carter Family hit song.

"Wildwood Flower" is a variant of the song "I'll Twine 'Mid the Ringlets", published in 1860 by composer Joseph Philbrick Webster, who wrote the music, with lyrics attributed to Maud Irving. Other versions of the song have evolved, including "The Pale Amaranthus" (collected in Kentucky and North Carolina, reported in 1911), "Raven Black Hair" and "The Pale Wildwood Flower" (collected 1915–1919), and "The Frail Wildwood Flower".

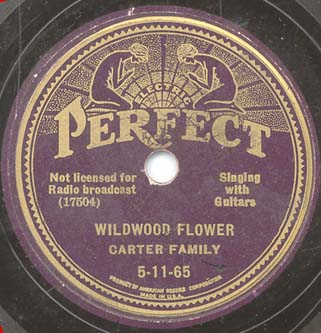
A record of the Carter Family's "Wildwood Flower"

The original Carter Family first recorded "Wildwood Flower" in 1928 on the Victor label. Maybelle Carter leads a rendition of the song on the 1972 album Will the Circle be Unbroken, and frequently performed the song in concert with Johnny (Jimmy D.) Cash and on his The Johnny Cash Show. The Carter version of the song is considered the premier example of "the Carter Scratch", a form of acoustic guitar playing in which the musician (in the case of the Carters, most notably Maybelle herself) plays both the melody and rhythm lines simultaneously.

Woody Guthrie used the tune of "I'll Twine 'Mid the Ringlets" for the verses of his song "The Sinking of the Reuben James", although he added a chorus to the song.

The original poem (if any) from which the lyrics derived has been lost. Other poems attributed to the reputed author of the lyrics, Maud Irving, may be found in periodicals of the time, including Godey's Lady's Book and Home Monthly. Several of the poems in the latter periodical carry bylines indicating that the Maud Irving of those poems was a pseudonym for poet and spiritualist J. William Van Namee.

== Lyrics ==
The original lyrics to the 1860 song "I'll Twine 'Mid the Ringlets", taken verbatim from the published sheet music (italics, recognized punctuation, and capitalization as in the original), are as follows.

I'll twine 'mid the ringlets
Of my raven black hair,
The lilies so pale
And the roses so fair,
The myrtle so bright
With an emerald hue,
And the pale aronatus
With eyes of bright blue.

I'll sing, and I'll dance,
My laugh shall be gay,
I'll cease this wild weeping
Drive sorrow away,
Tho' my heart is now breaking,
He never shall know,
That his name made me tremble
And my pale cheek to glow.

I'll think of him never
I'll be wildly gay,
I'll charm ev'ry heart
And the crowd I will sway,
I'll live yet to see him
Regret the dark hour
When he won, then neglected,
The frail wildwood flower.

He told me he loved me,
And promis'd to love,
Through ill and misfortune,
All others above,
Another has won him,
Ah! misery to tell;
He left me in silence
No word of farewell!

He taught me to love him,
He call'd me his flower
That blossom'd for him
All the brighter each hour;
But I woke from my dreaming,
My idol was clay;
My visions of love
Have all faded away.

== Evolution ==
Although originally a parlor song, the song had undergone the folk process by the time the Carter Family recorded it. For example, the first verse of "I'll Twine 'Mid the Ringlets" is

I'll twine 'mid the ringlets of my raven black hair,
The lilies so pale and the roses so fair,
The myrtle so bright with an emerald hue,
And the pale aronatus with eyes of bright blue.

whereas the Carter Family's "Wildwood Flower" begins

Oh, I'll twine with my mingles and waving black hair,
With the roses so red and the lilies so fair,
And the myrtle so bright with the emerald dew,
The pale and the leader and eyes look like blue.

In some versions, the order of the verses is changed, with the one ending in

I'll live yet to see him regret the dark hour
When he won, then neglected, the frail wildwood flower.

moved to the end, thus giving the impression that the woman has come to terms with her lost love and can move on.

However, the final verse as originally written,

But I woke from my dreaming, my idol was clay
My visions of love have all faded away.

clearly shows that the woman remains heartbroken, and thus preserves the sad, tragic nature of the song, rather than ending on an upbeat, but ultimately false note.
