= Ralph Stanley =

American bluegrass musician and singer (1927–2016)

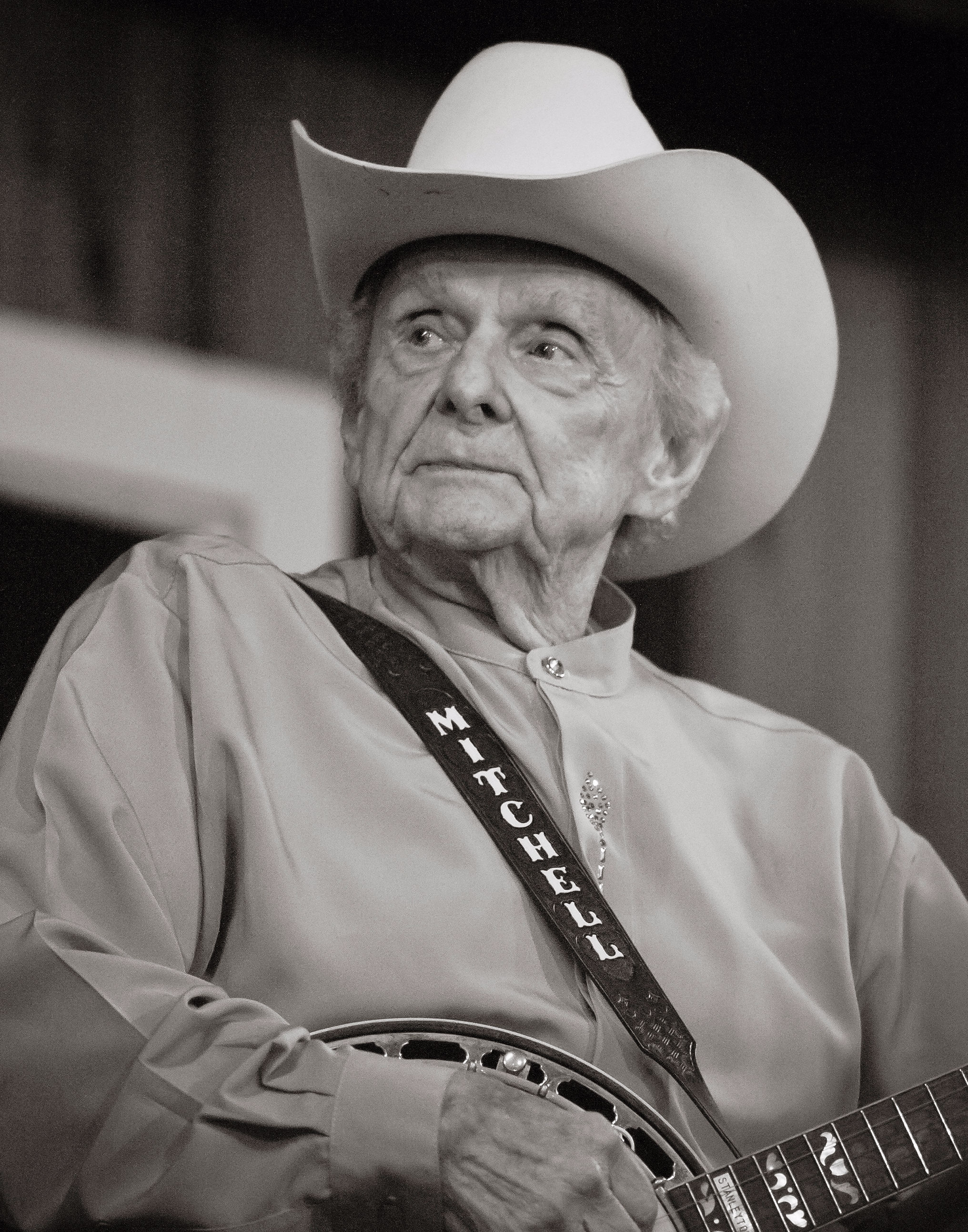
- Stanley in 2011

Background information
- Born: Ralph Edmund Stanley; February 25, 1927; McClure, Virginia, U.S.
- Origin: Big Spraddle Creek, Virginia, U.S.
- Died: June 23, 2016 (aged 89) Sandy Ridge, Virginia, U.S.
- Genres: Bluegrass; country; old-time; folk
- Occupation: Bluegrass musician
- Instrument: Banjo
- Years active: 1946–2016
- Labels: Columbia; Rebel
- Formerly of: Clinch Mountain Boys; Stanley Brothers
- Spouse: Jimmie Crabtree (m. 1968)
- Website: drralphstanleymusic.com

Ralph Edmund Stanley (February 25, 1927 – June 23, 2016) was an American bluegrass artist, known for his distinctive singing and banjo playing. He began playing music in 1946, originally with his older brother Carter Stanley as part of the Stanley Brothers, and most often as the leader of his band, the Clinch Mountain Boys. He was also known as Dr. Ralph Stanley.

He was part of the first generation of bluegrass musicians and was inducted into both the International Bluegrass Music Hall of Honor and the Grand Ole Opry. Stanley also often performed with Country music artists and performed the genre itself.

The Stanley Brothers were inducted into the Country Music Hall of Fame in 2026.

== Biography ==
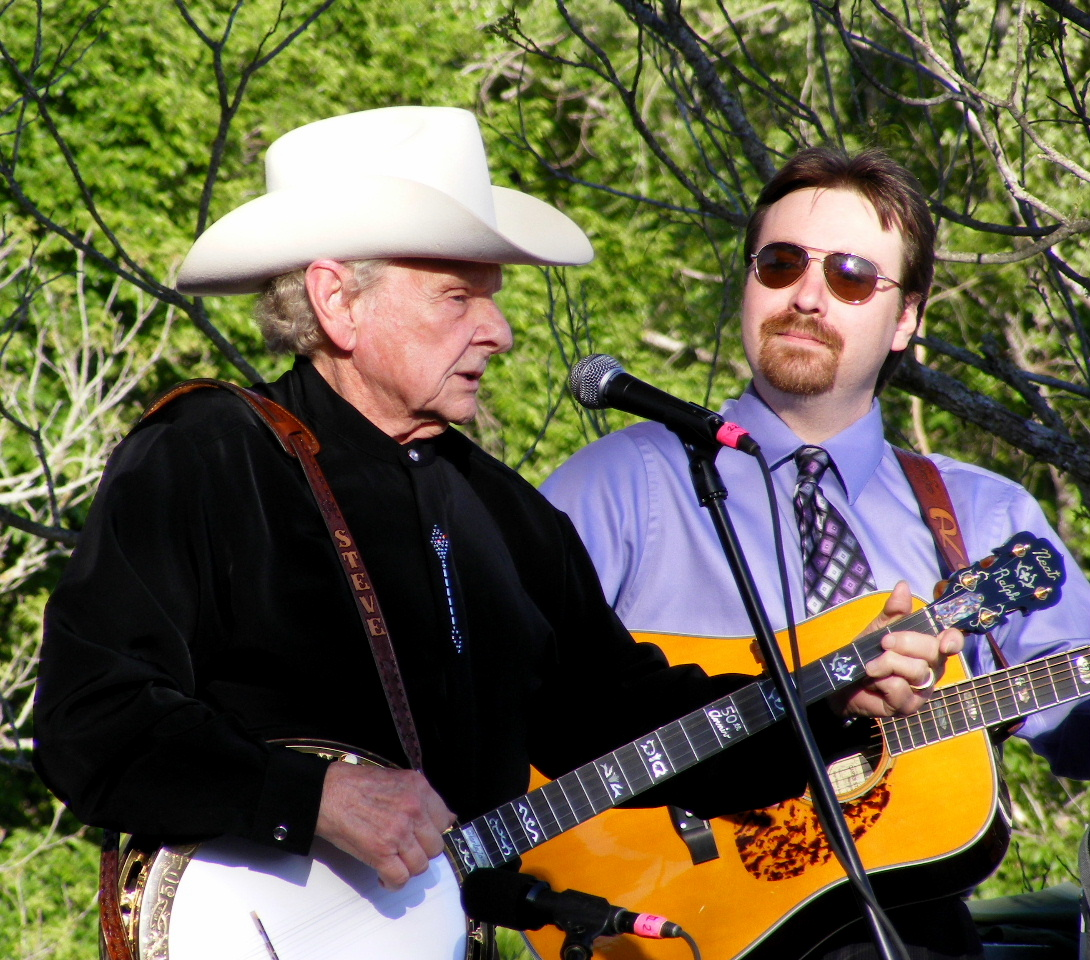
Stanley and son Ralph II in 2008

Stanley was born, grew up, and lived in rural Southwest Virginia—"in a little town called McClure at a place called Big Spraddle Creek, just up the holler" from where he moved in 1936. Before that he lived in another part of Dickenson County. The son of Lee and Lucy Smith Stanley, Ralph did not grow up around a lot of music in his home. As he said, his "daddy didn't play an instrument, but sometimes he would sing church music... I'd hear him sing songs like 'Man of Constant Sorrow,' 'Pretty Polly' and 'Omie Wise.'"

I got my first banjo when I was a teenager. I guess I was 15, 16 years old. My aunt had this old banjo, and Mother bought it for me ... paid $5 for it, which back then was probably like $5,000. [My parents] had a little store, and I remember my aunt took it out in groceries.

He learned to play the banjo, clawhammer style, from his mother:

She had 11 brothers and sisters, and all of them could play the five-string banjo. She played gatherings around the neighborhood, like bean stringin's. She tuned it up for me and played this tune, "Shout Little Luly," and I tried to play it like she did. But I think I developed my own style of the banjo.

He graduated from high school on May 2, 1945, and was inducted into the Army on May 16, serving for "little more than a year." When he got home he immediately began performing:

... my daddy and Carter picked me up from the (station), and Carter was playing with another group, Roy Sykes and the Blue Ridge Mountain Boys, and they had a personal appearance that night. So I sung a song with Carter on the radio before I even got home.

=== Clinch Mountain Boys ===
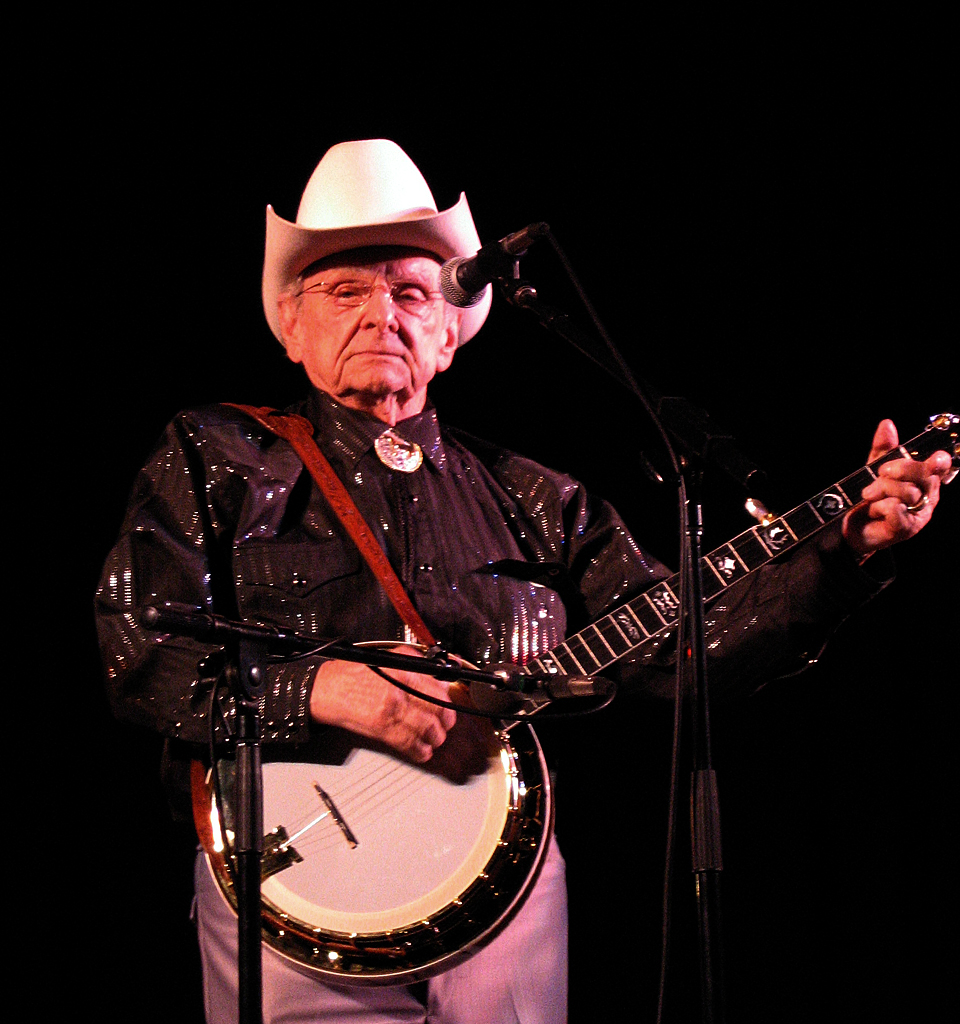
Stanley in 2006

After considering a course in "veterinary", he decided instead to join his older guitar-playing brother Carter Stanley (1925–1966) to form the Clinch Mountain Boys in 1946. Drawing heavily on the musical traditions of the area, which included the unique singing style of the Primitive Baptist Universalist church and the sweet down-home family harmonies of the Carter Family, the two Stanley brothers began playing on local radio stations. They first performed at Norton, Virginia's WNVA, but did not stay long there, moving on instead to Bristol, Virginia, and WCYB to start the show Farm and Fun Time, where they stayed "off and on for 12 years".

At first they covered "a lot of Bill Monroe music" (one of the first groups to pick up the new "bluegrass" format). They soon "found out that didn't pay off—we needed something of our own. So we started writing songs in 1947, 1948. I guess I wrote 20 or so banjo tunes, but Carter was a better writer than me." When Columbia Records signed them as The Stanley Brothers, Monroe left in protest joining Decca Records. Later, Carter went back to sing for the "Father of Bluegrass", Monroe.

Ralph Stanley gave his opinion on Bill Monroe's apparent change of heart: "He [Monroe] knew Carter would make him a good singer... Bill Monroe loved our music and loved our singing."

The Stanley Brothers joined King Records in the late 1950s, a record company which was so eclectic that it included James Brown at the time. In fact, James Brown and his band were in the studio when the Stanley Brothers recorded "Finger Poppin' Time". "James and his band were poppin' their fingers on that" according to Ralph. At King Records, they "went to a more 'Stanley style', the sound that people most know today."

Ralph and Carter performed as The Stanley Brothers with their band, The Clinch Mountain Boys, from 1946 to 1966. Ralph kept the band name when he continued as a solo act after Carter's death, from 1967 until his death in 2016.

=== Solo ===
After Carter died of complications of cirrhosis in 1966, after ailing for "a year or so", Ralph Stanley faced a hard decision on whether to continue performing on his own. "I was worried, I didn't know if I could do it by myself. But boy, I got letters, 3,000 of 'em, and phone calls... I went to Syd Nathan at King and asked him if he wanted me to go on, and he said, 'Hell yes! You might be better than both of them.'"

He decided to go it alone, eventually reviving The Clinch Mountain Boys. Larry Sparks, Roy Lee Centers, and Charlie Sizemore were among those with whom he played in the revived band. He encountered Ricky Skaggs and Keith Whitley arriving late to his own show, "They were about 16 or 17, and they were holding the crowd 'til we got there... They sounded just exactly like (the Stanley Brothers)." Seeing their potential, he hired them "to give 'em a chance", though that meant a seven-member band. Eventually, his son, Ralph Stanley II, took over as lead singer and rhythm guitarist for The Clinch Mountain Boys. His grandson Nathan Stanley became the last lead singer and band leader for The Clinch Mountain Boys.

Following Ralph Stanley Sr.'s death, Ralph Stanley II reformed the Clinch Mountain Boys as a trio, which continues to tour and record as of 2025. Nathan Stanley has since toured as a solo artist.

=== Political career ===
About 1970, Ralph Stanley ran for Clerk of Court and Commissioner of Revenue in Dickenson County and said:

What happened is, somebody traded me off—they used my popularity and money to elect somebody else. I was done dirty. And I'm so proud that I was done dirty, because if I had been elected ... I woulda had a job to do ... maybe woulda finally quit. So that's one time I was done dirty and I want to thank them for it now.

=== O Brother, Where Art Thou? ===
Stanley's work was featured in the very popular 2000 film O Brother, Where Art Thou?, in which he sings the Appalachian dirge "O Death". The soundtrack's producer was T-Bone Burnett. Stanley said the following about working with Burnett:

T-Bone Burnett had several auditions for that song. He wanted it in the Dock Boggs style. So I got my banjo and learned it the way he did it. You see, I had recorded "O Death" three times, done it with Carter. So I went down with my banjo to Nashville and I said, "T-Bone, let me sing it the way I want to sing it," and I laid my banjo down and sung it a cappella. After two or three verses, he stopped me and said, "That's it."

With that song, Stanley won a 2002 Grammy Award in the category of Best Male Country Vocal Performance. "That put the icing on the cake for me," he said. "It put me in a different category."

=== Later life ===
He was known in the world of bluegrass music by the popular title "Dr. Ralph Stanley", having been awarded an honorary doctorate in music from Lincoln Memorial University of Harrogate, Tennessee in 1976. Stanley was inducted into the International Bluegrass Music Hall of Honor in 1992 and in 2000; he became the first person to be inducted into the Grand Ole Opry in the third millennium.

He joined producers Randall Franks and Alan Autry for the In the Heat of the Night cast CD Christmas Time's A Comin', performing "Christmas Time's A Comin'" with the cast on the CD released on Sonlite and MGM/UA; it was one of the most popular Christmas releases of 1991 and 1992 with Southern retailers.

He was featured in the Josh Turner hit song "Me and God" released in 2006, the same year he was awarded the National Medal of Arts.

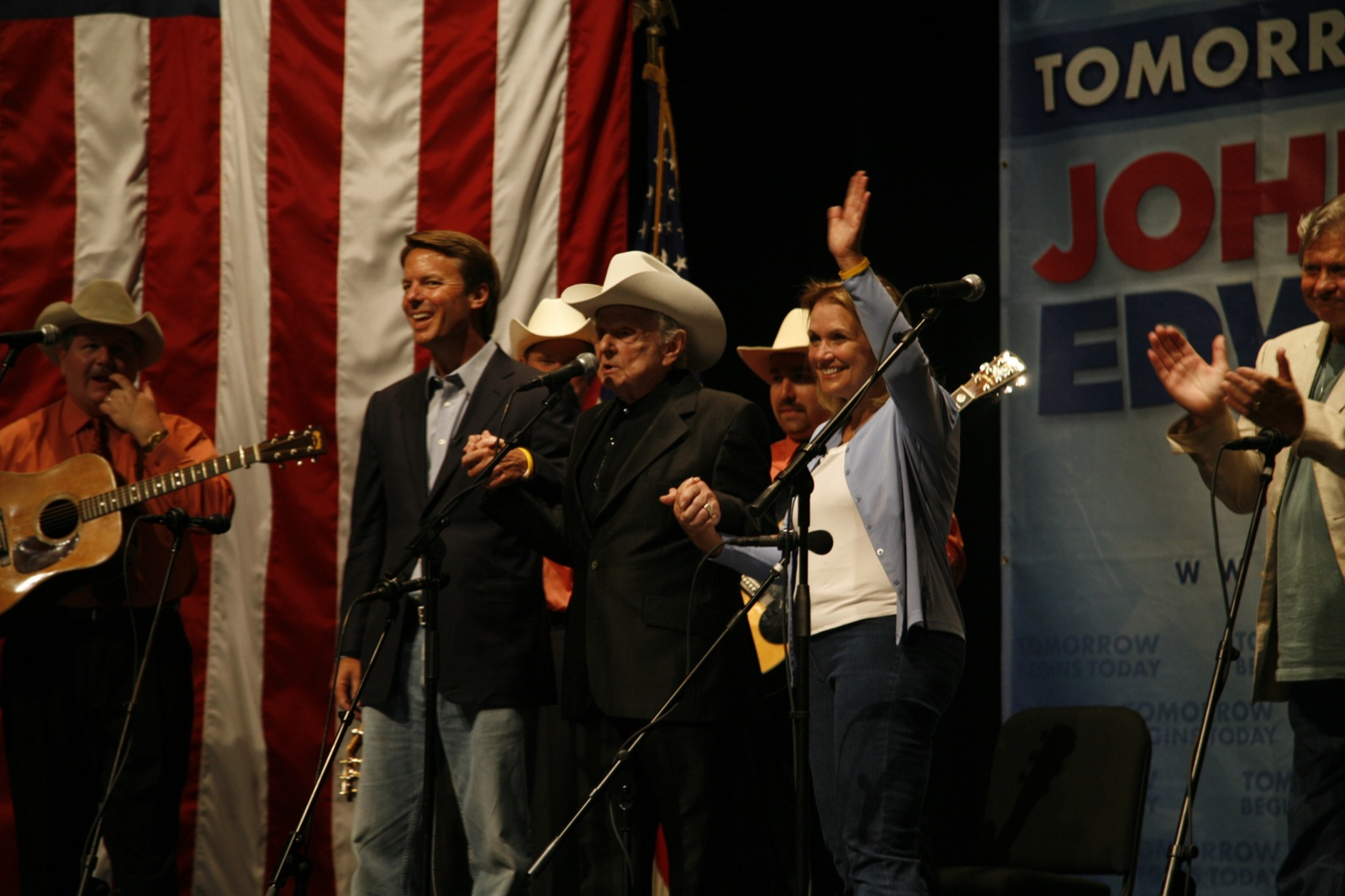
John and Elizabeth Edwards with Stanley and Clinch Mountain Boys, July 18, 2007

On November 10, 2007, Stanley and the Clinch Mountain Boys performed at a rally for presidential candidate John Edwards in Des Moines, Iowa, just before the Democratic Party's annual Jefferson-Jackson Day Dinner. Between renditions of "Man of Constant Sorrow" and "Orange Blossom Special", Stanley told the crowd that he had cast his first vote for Harry S. Truman in 1948 and would cast his next for John Edwards in 2008. In October 2008, he performed in a radio advertisement for Barack Obama's presidential campaign.

Country singer Dwight Yoakam said that Stanley is one of his "musical heroes".

In 2012, Stanley was featured on several tracks of the soundtrack for Nick Cave's film Lawless, with music by Cave and Warren Ellis. His solo track "White Light/White Heat" is prominent in several scenes of the movie.

Stanley maintained an active touring schedule; appearances in his later years included the 2012 Muddy Roots Music Festival in Cookeville, Tennessee and the 2013 FreshGrass Festival in North Adams, Massachusetts. In June 2013, he announced a farewell tour, scheduled to begin in Rocky Mount, North Carolina on October 18 and extending to December 2014. However, upon notification of being elected as a fellow of the American Academy of Arts and Sciences (awarded on October 11, 2014) a statement on his own website appeared saying that he would not be retiring.

=== Personal life and death ===
After two previous marriages ended in divorce, Stanley married his wife, Jimmie, in 1968; he had four children.

Stanley's autobiography, Man of Constant Sorrow which was coauthored with the music journalist Eddie Dean, was released by Gotham Books on October 15, 2009. On June 23, 2016, Stanley died from skin cancer at his home in Sandy Ridge in Dickenson County, Virginia; he was 89.

== Musical style ==
Stanley created a unique style of banjo playing, sometimes called "Stanley style". It evolved from the Wade Mainer style two-finger technique and was later influenced by the Scruggs style, which is a three-finger technique. "Stanley style" is distinguished by incredibly fast "forward rolls", led by the index finger (instead of the thumb, as in Scruggs style), sometimes in the higher registers using a capo. In "Stanley style", the rolls of the banjo are continuous, while being picked fairly close to the bridge on the banjo, giving the tone of the instrument a very crisp, articulate snap to the strings as the player plays them.

== Selected discography ==
Title	Details	Peak chart positions				
Title	Details	US Grass	US Country	US	US Heat	US Indie
Cry From the Cross	Release date: 1971; Label: Rebel Records	—	—	—	—	—
Clinch Mountain Gospel	Release date: 1977; Label: Rebel Records	—	—	—	—	—
I'll Answer the Call	Release date: 1987; Label: Rebel Records	—	—	—	—	—
Clinch Mountain Country	Release date: May 19, 1998; Label: Rebel Records	—	—	—	—	—
Man of Constant Sorrow	Release date: January 21, 2001; Label: Rebel Records	—	—	—	—	—
Clinch Mountain Sweethearts	Release date: September 25, 2001; Label: Rebel Records	—	—	—	—	—
Ralph Stanley	Release date: June 11, 2002; Label: Columbia Records/DMZ	3	22	163	5	—
Poor Rambler	Release date: June 17, 2003; Label: King Records	—	—	—	—	—
Shine On	Release date: June 7, 2005; Label: Rebel Records	6	—	—	—	—
A Distant Land to Roam	Release date: May 30, 2006; Label: Columbia Records/DMZ	4	—	—	—	—
Mountain Preacher's Child	Release date: April 3, 2007; Label: Rebel Records	9	—	—	—	—
A Mother's Prayer	Release date: April 19, 2011; Label: Rebel Records	6	—	—	—	—
Old Songs & Ballads	Release date: August 14, 2012; Label: Rebel Records	12	—	—	—	—
Old Songs & Ballads: Volume Two	Release date: August 14, 2012; Label: Rebel Records	14	—	—	—	—
Side by Side (with Ralph Stanley II)	Release date: February 18, 2014; Label: Rebel Records	3	—	—	—	—
My Life & Legacy: The Very Best of Ralph Stanley	Release date: September 16, 2014; Label: Rebel Records	9	—	—	—	—
Ralph Stanley & Friends: Man of Constant Sorrow	Release date: January 19, 2015; Label: Cracker Barrel	1	14	—	1	17
"—" denotes releases that did not chart

=== With Joe Isaacs ===
- Gospel Gathering (1995, Freeland)

=== Other contributions ===
- Real: The Tom T. Hall Project (1998, Sire Records) – track 13: "The Water Lily" (feat. Ralph Stanley II)
- Lifted: Songs of the Spirit (2002, Sony/Hear Music) – "Listen to the Shepherd"
- Re:Generation Music Project soundtrack (2012) – "Wayfaring Stranger"

== Honors, awards, distinctions ==
- Stanley was widely known in the world of bluegrass music by the popular title, "Dr. Ralph Stanley," after being awarded an honorary Doctor of Music from Lincoln Memorial University in Harrogate, Tennessee, in 1976.
- He was a recipient of a 1984 National Heritage Fellowship awarded by the National Endowment for the Arts, which is the United States government's highest honor in the folk and traditional arts.
- He was inducted into the International Bluegrass Music Hall of Honor in 1992 and in 2000.
- Between 1993 and 2015, Stanley was nominated for 15 Grammy Awards in various categories.
- He became the first person to be inducted into the Grand Ole Opry in the third millennium.
- His work was featured in the 2000 film O Brother, Where Art Thou?, in which he sings the Appalachian dirge "O Death". That song won him a 2002 Grammy Award in the category of Best Male Country Vocal Performance.
- His 2002 collaborative recording with Jim Lauderdale titled Lost in the Lonesome Pines won the Grammy Award for Best Bluegrass Album at the 45th Annual Grammy Awards.
- The Virginia Press Association made him their Distinguished Virginian of the Year in 2004.
- The Ralph Stanley Museum and Traditional Mountain Music Center opened in Clintwood, Virginia in 2004.
- He was awarded the National Medal of Arts in 2006, the nation's highest honor for artistic excellence.
- The Virginia legislature designated him the Outstanding Virginian of 2008.
- He was awarded the Key to the City of Garner, North Carolina on November 15, 2008.
- He was named a Library of Congress Living Legend in April 2000.
- He was inducted into the Virginia Musical Museum & Virginia Music Hall of Fame in 2013.
- He received a second honorary Doctor of Music degree from Yale University on May 19, 2014.
- He became an elected fellow of the American Academy of Arts and Sciences on October 11, 2014.
- From the January 2, 2015 death of Little Jimmy Dickens until his own death, Stanley was the oldest living member of the Grand Ole Opry.
- In 2024, Stanley was inducted into the American Banjo Museum Hall of Fame in the Historical category.
