= Ralph Peer =

American talent scout and recording engineer (1892–1960)

- Born: Ralph Sylvester Peer; May 22, 1892; Independence, Missouri, U.S.
- Died: January 19, 1960 (aged 67) Los Angeles, California, U.S.
- Genres: Country, folk, old-time
- Occupations: Record producer; recording engineer; talent scout; music publisher
- Years active: 1920s–1930s
- Labels: Columbia, OKeh, Victor

Ralph Sylvester Peer (May 22, 1892 – January 19, 1960) was an American talent scout, recording engineer, record producer and music publisher in the 1920s and 1930s. Peer pioneered field recording of music when in June 1923 he took remote recording equipment south to Atlanta, Georgia, to record regional music outside the recording studio in such places as hotel rooms, ballrooms, or empty warehouses. Peer also designed the modern day arrangement where artists get a share of the royalties from the copyright of their songs as well as the record sales. He has been inducted into Hall of Fames for country music as well as for the blues.

== Career ==
Peer, born in Independence, Missouri, spent some years working for Columbia Records, in Kansas City, Missouri, until 1920, when he was hired as recording director of General Phonograph's OKeh Records label in New York. In the same year, he supervised the recording of Mamie Smith's "Crazy Blues", the first blues recording specifically aimed at the African-American market. He first recorded in Atlanta in June 1923, having to bring his own equipment since there were not any recording studios. This made him the first person from New York to record on-location in the south. His recording of Lucile Bogan that year marked the first time blues music was recorded in the south. In 1924, he supervised the first commercial recording session in New Orleans, Louisiana, recording jazz, blues, and gospel music groups there.

He is also credited with what is often called the first country music recording, Fiddlin' John Carson's disc "Little Old Log Cabin In The Lane"/"That Old Hen Cackled and The Rooster's Goin' To Crow". In August 1927, while talent hunting in the southern states for the Victor Talking Machine Company, he recorded both Jimmie Rodgers and the Carter Family in the same session at a makeshift studio in the empty second floor warehouse of the Taylor-Christian hat company Bristol, Tennessee, known as the Bristol sessions. This momentous event could be described as the genesis of country music as we know it today. Rodgers, who later became known as the Father Of Country Music, cut "The Soldier's Sweetheart" and "Sleep, Baby, Sleep", while the Carters' first sides (August 1, 1927) were: "Bury Me under the Weeping Willow", "Single Girl, Married Girl", "The Poor Orphan Child", and "The Storms Are on the Ocean". Also in 1927, Peer recorded the fathers of modern RnB, The Memphis Jug Band, in a makeshift studio in the heart of Memphis' Beale St. in the McCall Building. In Atlanta that October, he was the first to record Blind Willie McTell as well as a sanctified preacher named Elder J.E. Burch who would become the inspiration for Dizzy Gillespie to begin playing music. He also cut the first recording In July 1929, he recorded female country singer Billie Maxwell.

In his autobiography, Nathaniel Shilkret, Manager of the Victor Talking Machine Company's Foreign Department from about 1920 through 1926 and then Director of Light Music until 1933, notes that about a year after he hired Peer, Peer asked for a raise, which Shilkret approved. Shilkret comments on Peer's business acumen in making a very profitable trade for this raise: "[Victor executive] Walter Clark met Peer, who sold Clark an idea. No raise, but a royalty of one cent per record side that he would divide with the artist.... When I heard of this I was stunned. No one on the musical staff had been offered royalty for his arrangements or compositions, and here was a man collecting royalties with other men's compositions!” Peer was making $1 million/year in royalties at a time when the average American made $700 a year. By the 1930s, Peer helped pioneer the business arrangement where artists would get a share of the royalties from the copyright of their work as well as from record sales.

Peer went on to publish and record other country and jazz artists and songs through his company Southern Music Publishing Company. Fats Waller, Jelly Roll Morton, Louis Armstrong, and Count Basie were on Southern's roster. Then into popular music with songs such as Hoagy Carmichael and Stuart Gorrell's "Georgia On My Mind".

The company became influential in the 1930s, and success came through Peer's introducing Central American music to the world. In 1940, there was a major development when a dispute between the copyright organization American Society of Composers, Authors and Publishers (ASCAP) and US radio stations led to the inauguration of the rival Broadcast Music Incorporated (BMI). BMI supported music by blues, country and hillbilly artists, and Peer, through his Peer-International company, soon contributed a major part of BMI's catalogue.

Of the songs in Harry Smith’s Anthology of American Folk Music (1952), one third of the pre-war recordings deemed significant were done by Peer. He attributed the beginning of the modern folk era as 1923 when Peer went to Atlanta.

During and after World War II Peer published songs such as "Deep in the Heart of Texas" and "You Are My Sunshine" (sung by Jimmie Davis, covered by Bing Crosby and many others), "Humpty Dumpty Heart" (Glenn Miller), "You're Nobody till Somebody Loves You" (Russ Morgan), "The Three Caballeros" (Andrews Sisters), "Say A Prayer For The Boys Over There" (Deanna Durbin), "I Should Care", and "The Coffee Song" (both Frank Sinatra). In 1945, he published Jean Villard and Bert Reisfeld's composition "Les trois cloches" ("The Three Bells"), which was recorded by The Browns.

In the 1950s, Peer published "Mockingbird Hill", a million seller for Patti Page, "Sway" (Dean Martin and Bobby Rydell), and the novelty "I Know An Old Lady" (Burl Ives). Then came rock 'n' roll and Southern published hits by Buddy Holly, Little Richard, The Big Bopper, and The Platters.

Starting in the late 1940s, Peer took an avid interest in horticulture, growing and becoming an expert on camellias. He died in Hollywood, California, on January 19, 1960.

== Honors ==
In 1955, Ralph S. Peer was awarded the Veitch Memorial Medal by the Royal Horticultural Society (RHS).

Peer was elected to the Country Music Hall of Fame in 1984 and the Blues Hall of Fame in 2020/2021.

== Legacy ==
In 2017, Peer was featured in the award-winning documentary series American Epic. Directed by Bernard MacMahon, the films featured restored audio recordings of Ralph Peer discussing how he found and recorded some of the first country, blues, and RnB musicians in the 1920s.
