= Woodlawn Memorial Park =

Woodlawn Memorial Park may refer to:

- Woodlawn Memorial Park (Colma, California), Colma, California, United States
- Woodlawn Memorial Park (Compton, California), Compton, California, United States
- Woodlawn Memorial Park (Allentown, Pennsylvania), Allentown, Pennsylvania, United States
- Woodlawn Memorial Park (Nashville, Tennessee), Nashville, Tennessee, United States

== See also ==
- Memorial Park (disambiguation)
- Hendersonville Memory Gardens, also known as Woodlawn Memorial Park East, Hendersonville, Tennessee, United States
- Woodlawn Memorial Cemetery (Santa Monica, California), Santa Monica, California, United States
