= My Darling Vivian =

- My Darling Vivian poster
- Directed by: Matt Riddlehoover
- Produced by: Dustin Tittle; Matt Riddlehoover; Tara Cash Schwoebel
- Starring: Vivian Liberto; Johnny Cash; Rosanne Cash; Kathy Cash Tittle; Cindy Cash; Tara Cash Schwoebel
- Cinematography: Josh Moody
- Edited by: Matt Riddlehoover
- Music by: Ian A. Hughes
- Production company: This Heart of Mine
- Distributed by: The Film Collaborative
- Release dates: April 27, 2020 (SXSW); December 8, 2020 (United States)
- Running time: 90 minutes
- Country: United States
- Language: English

My Darling Vivian is a 2020 American documentary film about Vivian Liberto, the first wife of Johnny Cash, directed by Matt Riddlehoover.

The film premiered at the 2020 South by Southwest Film Festival, presented by Amazon Prime Video, on April 27, 2020. It received acclaim from critics and audiences, and was chosen by The Hollywood Reporter and the Los Angeles Times as a "must-see" critics' pick.

== Premise ==
Director Matt Riddlehoover traces the romantic and dizzying journey of Vivian Liberto, Johnny Cash's first wife and the mother of his four daughters.

== Appearances ==
- Rosanne Cash (Daughter)
- Kathy Cash Tittle (Daughter)
- Cindy Cash (Daughter)
- Tara Cash Schwoebel (Daughter)
- Vivian Liberto in archival recordings
- Johnny Cash in archival recordings

== Release ==
My Darling Vivian was shown at many film festivals, including South by Southwest, Northwestfest, the RiverRun International Film Festival, Galway Film Fleadh, and the Bentonville Film Festival. It had a virtual cinema release in US theaters on June 19, 2020, at Hot Docs Ted Rogers Cinema in Toronto on June 25, 2020, and at the VIFF Centre on June 26, 2020 in Vancouver.

== Reception ==
=== Critical response ===
On Rotten Tomatoes, the film holds an approval rating of 95%, and an average rating of 8/10. The website's critical consensus reads, "My Darling Vivian adds an overdue corrective to the public story of Johnny Cash's private life -- and a strong testament to the woman at its center." On Metacritic, the film has a weighted average score of 78 out of 100, indicating "generally favorable reviews".

Joe Leydon of Variety wrote: "An exceptional documentary... A fascinating and affecting corrective counterpoint to the Johnny Cash mythos." Sheri Linden of The Hollywood Reporter wrote: "Brings a woman erased into vivid focus... an engaging and revelatory film that's also deeply affecting."

On May 1, 2020, Thirteen Reasons Why author Jay Asher called the film "incredible" and "inspiring in its sadness" on Twitter.

=== Accolades ===
Award	Date of ceremony	Category	Recipient(s)	Result	Ref(s)
Bentonville Film Festival Jury Award	August 16, 2020	Best Editing, Documentary	Matt Riddlehoover	Won	
In-Edit Chile Audience Award	December 7, 2020	Best International Documentary	Matt Riddlehoover	Won	
