= Johnny Cash Sings with B.C. Goodpasture Christian School =

Johnny Cash Sings with the B.C. Goodpasture Christian School

Studio album by Johnny Cash
- Released: 1979
- Recorded: 1979
- Studios: Hilltop Studios (Madison, Tennessee); Columbia (Nashville, Tennessee)
- Genre: Gospel
- Length: 25:02
- Label: Goodpasture Christian School

Johnny Cash chronology
A Believer Sings the Truth (1979)	Johnny Cash Sings with the B.C. Goodpasture Christian School (1979)	Rockabilly Blues (1980)

Johnny Cash Sings with the B.C. Goodpasture Christian School is a 1979 Johnny Cash album recorded with the students of the B.C. Goodpasture Christian School. Cash re-recorded many gospel songs he had previously recorded and the students' voices were dubbed onto Cash's vocals. The album was released in 1979 and has become very rare.

== Track listing ==
Side one
No.	Title	Length
1.	"American Trilogy"	3:14
2.	"Will the Circle Be Unbroken / Daddy Sang Bass"	3:26
3.	"Everything Is Beautiful"	1:56
4.	"Gospel John / Country Road" (Instrumental)	4:27

Side two
No.	Title	Length
1.	"Amazing Grace"	1:40
2.	"Sweet By and By"	2:26
3.	"When the Roll Is Called Up Yonder"	1:37
4.	"Precious Memories"	1:57
5.	"Old Rugged Cross"	2:24
6.	"Rock of Ages"	1:55

== Personnel ==
Adapted from the album liner notes.

Performance

- Harold Bradley – dobro, guitar, bass guitar, banjo (all tracks)
- Johnny Cash – lead vocals (side one, tracks 1–3; side two, tracks 1–6)
- Goodpasture Christian School Chorus – vocals (side two, tracks 1–6)
  - Julie Biffle, Hal Balthrop, Brandy Boone, Beth Bradshaw, Jeff Burnette, Jeff Carnahan, Jim Carney, Cecily Duncan, Deidra Elwell, Kerry Grant, Kim Hoover, Rachel Hosse, Alisa Jones, Karen Jones, Kevin Kolbe, Chuck Odom, Lisa Odum, Lynne Rye, Vicky Stewart, Kitty Taylor, Brian Waite, Lisa Williams, Paul Wingfield, Paula Young
- Goodpasture Christian School Concert Band – instrumentation (side one, tracks 1–4)
- Goodpasture Christian School Stage Band – instrumentation (side one, tracks 1–4)
  - Brass: Keith Beck, trumpet; Brian Bennett, trombone; Mike Connor, trumpet; Eddie Slowey, trumpet; Marty Williams, trumpet
  - Rhythm: Anne Fottrell, piano; Kip Raines, drums; Alan Rice, bass guitar; Johnny Sturdivant, guitar
  - Woodwinds: Emily Boyd, tenor sax and flute; Carl Eidson, alto and baritone sax; Lisa Odum, tenor sax; Lisa Williams, alto sax
- Richard VanDyke – Goodpasture Music Director

Production

- Ken Laxton – recording engineer (Columbia Recording Studios) (side one)
- Bill Linneman – recording engineer (Hilltop Studios) (side two)

Other personnel

- John Hayes – poster and back cover photos
- Precision Record Pressing – pressing
- Chip Schofield – front cover photo
- Woodland Studios – mastering (all tracks)
