= Thomas Gabriel =

Thomas Gabriel may refer to:

- Sir Thomas Gabriel, 1st Baronet (1811–1891), British timber merchant and Lord Mayor of London
- Thomas Gabriel, character in Live Free or Die Hard, played by Timothy Olyphant
- Thomas Gabriel (composer) (born 1957), German composer
- Thomas Gabriel (missionary) (1837–1875), founder of the Canadian Baptist Mission in India
- Thomas Gabriel (country singer) (born 1973), American singer and songwriter
