= A Believer Sings the Truth =

Studio album by Johnny Cash
- Released: December 1979
- Recorded: January–May 1979
- Genre: Gospel
- Length: 55:39
- Label: Cachet; Columbia
- Producer: Johnny Cash; Jack Routh; Jack Clement

Johnny Cash chronology
| Silver (1979) | A Believer Sings the Truth (1979) | Rockabilly Blues (1980) |

Singles from A Believer Sings the Truth
- 1. "Wings in the Morning" Released: December 1979

Professional ratings
Review scores
| Source | Rating |
|---|---|
| AllMusic | 2.5/5 stars |
| The Rolling Stone Album Guide | 2/5 stars |

A Believer Sings the Truth is a gospel double album by American country musician Johnny Cash. The tracks for the album were recorded in 1979.

Cash was under contract to Columbia Records, but the label was doubtful that a double-album of gospel songs was commercially viable. With the label's blessing, Cash was allowed to release it on his own on the Cachet label and as a radio special with added narration. His efforts paid off, as the album made it into the Country Top 50, peaking at #43.

In 1982, Columbia reissued the album itself, and in 1984 an edited-down version titled I Believe appeared on Arrival Records. Two tracks: "I Was There When it Happened" and "What on Earth", were re-recordings. "Children Go" was part of Cash's live set.

Prior to 2012 the only CD release of tracks from the album occurred with two tracks appearing in the God portion of the 2004 box set Love, God, Murder (a set compiled by Cash soon before his death in 2003), and two more tracks appeared on 2007's Ultimate Gospel. The complete contents of the album (plus a previously unreleased outtake) made their CD debut as Disk 1 of the 2012 release Bootleg Vol. IV: The Soul of Truth. It is one of only a handful of Columbia-related albums not to be included in the 2012 box set release Johnny Cash: The Complete Columbia Album Collection.

== Track listing ==
Side One
| No. | Title | Writer(s) | Length |
|---|---|---|---|
| 1. | "Wings in the Morning" | Johnny Cash | 2:43 |
| 2. | "Gospel Boogie (A Wonderful Time up There)" | Lee Roy Abernathy | 2:40 |
| 3. | "Over the Next Hill" (with Anita Carter) | Johnny Cash | 2:36 |
| 4. | "He's Alive" (with June Carter Cash) | Don Francisco | 4:16 |
| 5. | "I've Got Jesus in My Soul" | Jo-El Sonnier, Tom Ross | 2:42 |

Side Two
| No. | Title | Writer(s) | Length |
|---|---|---|---|
| 1. | "When He Comes" (with Rosanne Cash) | Johnny Cash | 3:33 |
| 2. | "I Was There When It Happened" (with Marshall Grant) | Jimmie Davis, Fern Jones | 2:16 |
| 3. | "I'm a Newborn Man" (John Carter Cash) | Johnny Cash, June Carter | 1:42 |
| 4. | "There Are Strange Things Happening Every Day" | Sister Rosetta Tharpe | 3:34 |
| 5. | "Children Go Where I Send Thee" | Traditional | 2:39 |

Side Three
| No. | Title | Writer(s) | Length |
|---|---|---|---|
| 1. | "(I'm Just an) Old Chunk of Coal" | Billy Joe Shaver | 2:14 |
| 2. | "Lay Me Down in Dixie" (with Cindy Cash) | Jo-El Sonnier, Judy Ball | 2:01 |
| 3. | "Don't Take Everybody for Your Friend" | Roy Carroll, Sister Rosetta Tharpe | 2:25 |
| 4. | "You'll Get Yours, I'll Get Mine" (with Rodney Crowell) | Johnny Cash | 2:23 |
| 5. | "Oh Come Angel Band" | Johnny Cash | 2:45 |

Side Four
| No. | Title | Writer(s) | Length |
|---|---|---|---|
| 1. | "This Train is Bound for Glory" (with June Carter Cash) | Sister Rosetta Tharpe | 3:31 |
| 2. | "I'm Gonna Try to Be That Way" (with Jan Howard) | Johnny Cash | 2:50 |
| 3. | "What on Earth (Will You Do for Heaven's Sake)" | Johnny Cash | 2:10 |
| 4. | "That's Enough" | Dorothy Love Coates | 2:45 |
| 5. | "The Greatest Cowboy of Them All" (with Jack Routh) | Johnny Cash | 3:54 |

== Charts ==
Album - Billboard (United States)

| Year | Chart | Position |
|---|---|---|
| December 1979 | Country Albums | 43 |

== I Believe ==
I Believe album cover

In 1984, I Believe was released on the Arrival Records label, with ten songs from A Believer Sings the Truth and four outtakes from the same sessions. Like its parent album, I Believe has not been released on CD.

=== Track listing ===
Side One
| No. | Title | Length |
|---|---|---|
| 1. | "That's Enough" |
| 2. | "Don't Take Anyone to be Your Friend" |
| 3. | "Jesus in My Soul" |
| 4. | "Newborn Man" |
| 5. | "I'll Have a New Life" |
| 6. | "This Train" |
| 7. | "I Was There When it Happened" |

Side Two
| No. | Title | Length |
|---|---|---|
| 1. | "Lay Me Down in Dixie" |
| 2. | "Strange Things Happen Every Day" |
| 3. | "You'll Get Yours and I'll Get Mine" |
| 4. | "Didn't it Rain" |
| 5. | "He Touched Me" |
| 6. | "Way Worn Traveler" |
| 7. | "I'm Gonna Try to be That Way" |
