= Believe in Him =

Studio album by Johnny Cash
- Released: July 21, 1986
- Recorded: May – December 1982
- Genre: Country gospel; Southern gospel; CCM
- Length: 27:53
- Label: Word
- Producer: Marty Stuart

Johnny Cash chronology
Class of '55: Memphis Rock & Roll Homecoming (1986)	Believe in Him (1986)	Johnny Cash Is Coming to Town (1987)

Believe in Him is a gospel album and 71st overall album by American country singer Johnny Cash, released on Word Records in 1986. It features acoustic arrangements of classic gospel songs.

The tracks were originally recorded in 1982 for a planned album release on the Columbia Records subsidiary label, Priority Records, under the title Johnny Cash - Gospel Singer. The album was cancelled when parent CBS Records shut down Priority, and the tracks remained unreleased until issued as Believe in Him by Word records.

It is notable as the first album of original material to be released by Cash after leaving Columbia Records though he originally recorded the tracks for the company. He subsequently signed with Mercury Records.

In 2012, it was released entirely on CD for the first time as part of Bootleg Vol 4: The Soul of Truth, with a different running order which reflected the originally planned running order for the cancelled Johnny Cash - Gospel Singer, and with the addition of four previously unissued outtakes from the recording sessions.

"Belshazzar" had previously been recorded by Cash for Sun Records. The album featured the Cathedral Quartet on background vocals.

Professional ratings
Review scores
Source	Rating
Allmusic	2/5 stars

== Track listing ==
No.	Title	Writer(s)	Length
1.	"Believe in Him"	Jimmy Tittle	3:25
2.	"Another Wide River to Cross"	Johnny Cash	2:25
3.	"God Ain't No Stained Glass Window"	Mark Germino	3:07
4.	"Over There"	Ray Pennington	3:12
5.	"The Old Rugged Cross" (with Jessi Colter)	George Bennard	2:25
6.	"My Children Walk in Truth"	Johnny Cash	2:39
7.	"You're Driftin' Away"	Bill Monroe	1:35
8.	"Belshazzar"	Johnny Cash	2:51
9.	"Half a Mile a Day"	Johnny Cash	3:21
10.	"One of These Days I'm Gonna Sit Down and Talk to Paul"	Johnny Cash	3:04

== Personnel ==
- Johnny Cash – vocals, guitar
- Marty Stuart – producer, guitar, mandolin
- Bob Wootton – guitar
- Earl "Poole" Ball – piano
- Hargus "Pig" Robbins – piano
- Bob Whitlock – synthesizer, organ
- David Briggs – synthesizer, organ
- Jack Grochmal – pump organ
- W. S. Holland – drums
- Kenny Malone – drums
- Jimmy Tittle – bass
- Bob Wray – bass
- Roy Huskey, Jr. – bass
- T. Michael Coleman – bass
- Joe Allen – bass
- Peter Drake – steel guitar
- The Cathedral Quartet – guest vocalist
- Jessie Colter – guest vocals on "Rugged Old Cross"
- Mike Leech – string arrangements
