= The Junkie and the Juicehead Minus Me =

Studio album by Johnny Cash
- Released: September 23, 1974
- Genre: Country
- Length: 30:38
- Label: Columbia
- Producer: Johnny Cash; Charlie Bragg

Johnny Cash chronology
Ragged Old Flag (1974)	The Junkie and the Juicehead Minus Me (1974)	Five Feet High and Rising (1974)

Singles from The Junkie and the Juicehead Minus Me
- 1. "The Junkie and the Juicehead (Minus Me)" Released: June 1974; 2. "Father and Daughter (Father and Son)" Released: August 1974

Professional ratings
Review scores
Source	Rating
AllMusic	3/5 stars

The Junkie and the Juicehead Minus Me is the 48th overall album by country singer Johnny Cash, released in 1974 on Columbia Records. Although credited to Cash alone, the album includes solo performances by his daughter Rosanne Cash, and stepdaughters Rosie Nix Adams and Carlene Carter (credited as Carlene Routh), predating the launch of their own solo careers. Two songs on the album were written by Kris Kristofferson, while "Don't Take Your Guns to Town" is a re-recording of a highly successful Cash single, his first smash hit for Columbia from back in 1958. "Keep on the Sunny Side" had previously been recorded for the early 1960s Carter Family album of the same title, on which Cash had provided guest vocals. "Father and Daughter (Father and Son)" is a cover version of a well-known Cat Stevens song and a duet with Cash's stepdaughter, Rosie Nix Adams, with slight changes in lyrics; a version of the same song would be released in 2003 on Unearthed, as a duet with Fiona Apple. June Carter Cash also performs a solo track without her husband, one of only a couple of occasions where she did this on a Johnny Cash album outside of concert recordings.

== Track listing ==
No.	Title	Writer(s)	Length
1.	"The Junkie and the Juicehead, Minus Me"	Kris Kristofferson	3:00
2.	"Don't Take Your Guns to Town"	Johnny Cash	2:47
3.	"Broken Freedom Song" (performed by Rosanne Cash)	Kris Kristofferson	3:01
4.	"I Do Believe"	Johnny Cash	2:30
5.	"Ole Slew Foot" (with June Carter Cash and family)	Howard Hausey	2:16
6.	"Keep on the Sunny Side" (with June Carter Cash and family)	A. P. Carter, Gary Garett	2:15
7.	"Father and Daughter (Father and Son)" (with Rosie Nix Adams)	Cat Stevens	3:00
8.	"Crystal Chandeliers and Burgundy"	Jack Wesley Routh	2:24
9.	"Friendly Gates" (performed by Carlene Carter)	Jack Wesley Routh	2:18
10.	"Billy and Rex and Oral and Bob"	Johnny Cash	2:25
11.	"Jesus" (with June Carter Cash)	Loney Hutchins	2:18
12.	"Lay Back with My Woman"	Jack Wesley Routh	2:24

Note: Track 2 "Don't Take Your Guns to Town" is a re-recording, recorded 18 June 1974 at Sound Spectrum Recording, House of Cash, Hendersonville, Tennessee.

== Personnel ==
- Johnny Cash - vocals, guitar
- Bob Wootton, Carl Perkins, Jerry Hensley, David Jones, Randy Scruggs, Jerry Shook, Helen Carter, Jack Routh - guitar
- Marshall Grant, Ronnie Reno, Jimmy Tittle - bass
- WS Holland, DJ Fontana - drums
- Stu Basone - steel guitar
- Gordon Terry - fiddle
- Larry McCoy, Jerry Whitehurst - piano
- The Carter Family, Rosanne Cash, Carlene Routh, Rosey Nix, June Carter Cash - vocals

Additional personnel

- Produced by Charlie Bragg and Johnny Cash
- Cover photo: Marion Ward
- Flyleaf photos: Marion Ward and Hope Powell
- Album design: Bill Barnes and Peggy Owens

== Charts ==
Chart (1974)	Peak position
US Country Albums (Billboard)	48
