= Rosie Nix Adams =

American singer (1958–2003)

Rosie Nix-Adams
- Born: Rozanna Lea Nix; July 13, 1958; Madison, Tennessee, U.S.
- Died: October 24, 2003 (aged 45) Clarksville, Tennessee, U.S.
- Genres: Country; folk; gospel
- Occupation: Singer

Rosie Nix Adams (born Rozanna Lea Nix; July 13, 1958 – October 24, 2003) was an American singer, in the genres of country, folk, and gospel.

She was the daughter of June Carter Cash and her second husband, Edwin "Rip" Nix, and granddaughter of Maybelle Carter of the Carter Family. After her mother married country music singer/songwriter Johnny Cash in 1968, Nix became one of his stepdaughters along with Carlene Carter.

== Early life ==
Nix was born in Madison, Tennessee to June Carter Cash and her second husband Edwin "Rip" Nix. Carlene Carter was her older half-sister from her mother's first marriage to Carl Smith. Later she became a stepdaughter of Johnny Cash when her mother married him in 1968 and was the half-sister of their son John Carter Cash.

Her first name was spelled as both "Rosie" and "Rosey", according to stepsister Rosanne Cash. Nix's mother nicknamed her "The Wildwood Rose" and sister Carlene wrote and recorded the song "Me and the Wildwood Rose" about the two of them traveling as children with their mother and grandmother as they performed. Nix grew up with six siblings, including half- and step-siblings.

== Career ==
Nix started her singing career performing as a backup singer for her stepfather's The Johnny Cash Show. She also performed with David Grey, and singer Slim Whitman.

She was a semi-regular performing member of the Carter Family. She performed a duet with Cash on his 1974 single "Father and Daughter" (a remake of the Cat Stevens song "Father and Son") from the album The Junkie and the Juicehead Minus Me.

After her marriage, Adams was a background vocalist in her mother's Grammy Award winning album Press On (1999). She sang in genres of country, folk, and gospel.

== Personal life and death ==
Nix married Philip Adams. She used the name Rosie Nix Adams as a performer.

On October 24, 2003 she and Jimmy Campbell, a bluegrass musician who played the fiddle, were found dead on a bus in Montgomery County, Tennessee. Law enforcement officials initially called the deaths "suspicious". The deaths were subsequently ruled to be accidental. They died from carbon monoxide poisoning, produced from propane space heaters in the bus that were used without ventilation.

Nix Adams was 45 years old. She was buried near her mother and stepfather, both of whom had also died earlier in the year, in the Hendersonville Memory Gardens in Hendersonville, Tennessee.
