= Vivian Cash =

First wife of Johnny Cash (1934–2005)

Vivian Liberto
- Born: Vivian Dorraine Liberto; April 23, 1934; San Antonio, Texas, U.S.
- Died: May 24, 2005 (aged 71); Ventura, California, U.S.
- Other names: Vivian Cash; Vivian Distin
- Occupations: Author; Homemaker
- Spouses: Johnny Cash (m. 1954; div. 1966) Dick Distin (m. 1968)
- Children: 4, including Rosanne and Cindy

Vivian Distin (née Liberto, formerly Cash; April 23, 1934 – May 24, 2005) was an American author and homemaker. She was the first wife of singer Johnny Cash and mother of their four daughters. She inspired his single "I Walk the Line".

Born and raised in San Antonio, Texas, Vivian was raised Catholic. She married Cash in San Antonio, but they separated after several years. In 1965, Cash, who was already well known, was arrested for drug possession. She stood by him during this time, and photographs of her were widely publicized.

Between 1965 and 1966, she faced discrimination due to her racial identity after white supremacists classified her as Black based on her appearance in the photos. At the time, interracial marriage was illegal in many places, and white supremacists claimed her marriage to Cash was unlawful. As a result, both she and her husband experienced harassment, and he was boycotted in the South for a year until his manager provided documentation confirming her classification as White.

After the couple divorced in 1966, they each married again. She had chief responsibility for raising their daughters. They typically spent time in the summer with their father and stepmother, June Carter Cash, both singer/songwriters.

In later life, Distin wrote a memoir, with Ann Sharpsteen, under her former married name of 'Vivian Cash'. Titled I Walked the Line, it was based on her years with Johnny Cash. She drew from the many letters they exchanged for three years before their marriage, when he was stationed in Europe. It was published posthumously in 2007.

== Biography ==
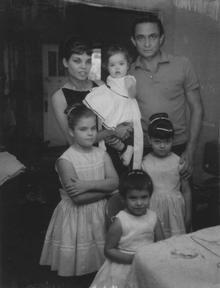
Vivian (left) with Johnny and their children in 1961

Vivian D. Liberto was born in San Antonio, Texas. She, her brother Raymond Alvin and sister Sylvia were the children of Irene (née Robinson), a homemaker, and Thomas Peter Liberto, an insurance salesman and amateur magician. Thomas was of Sicilian descent; his parents had immigrated to New Orleans and then Texas. Irene was of German, Irish, and African-American descent; her ancestors had been in Texas since the 19th century. Vivian and her siblings attended white schools in the segregated state.

=== Meeting Johnny Cash ===
On July 18, 1951, Vivian met Johnny Cash at a roller skating rink in San Antonio, Texas. She was 17 years old, and he was a 19 year old Air Force recruit in basic training. The couple courted for three weeks before the Air Force deployed Cash to West Germany for a three-year tour. During the separation, the couple exchanged hundreds of letters. Liberto later used these as the basis for her memoir I Walked the Line (2007).

On August 7, 1954, one month after Cash's discharge, they were married at St. Ann's Catholic Church in San Antonio. The wedding Mass was offered by Vivian's uncle who was a Catholic priest, Fr Vincent Liberto.

After marrying, the Cashes settled in Memphis, Tennessee, where Johnny Cash took a job as a vacuum cleaner salesman while also pursuing his music career. Within the first year of their marriage, Johnny Cash had become a rising country music star.

=== Move to California ===
After his rapid success, Cash moved Vivian and their family to Hollywood, where he pursued film roles and entertainment industry connections when he wasn't on tour.

In 1961, Johnny Cash moved the family to a hilltop home overlooking Casitas Springs, California. He had previously brought his parents to the area to run a small trailer park called the Johnny Cash Trailer Park. As Cash was frequently away from home on tour and the area had no amenities, Vivian and her daughters became increasingly isolated. Vivian often had to dispatch rattlesnakes and other vermin around the property.

=== Thunderbolt Magazine Incident ===
In 1965, Johnny Cash was arrested in Texas for possession of hundreds of amphetamine pills and bringing drugs into the United States across the Mexican border. Though the couple had been estranged for three years, Vivian flew to El Paso, Texas to accompany Cash to his court hearing. A widely circulated black and white photograph of them leaving the courthouse brought Vivian Cash to public notice for the first time. The Thunderbolt, a racist newsletter published by Ku Klux Klan (KKK) leader J.B. Stoner, published an article with inflammatory language about her and their marriage. It was distributed by the White supremacist National States' Rights Party.

The headline read "Arrest Exposes Johnny Cash's Negro Wife." In response to the article in The Thunderbolt, Johnny Cash hired Nashville lawyer Johnny Jay Hooker and threatened a $25 million lawsuit against the KKK. However the incident soon faded and there was no effect on Cash's career at the time.

Nearly two years later, the KKK revived their attack on the singer. They were unhappy about his criticism of the United States' treatment of Native Americans and his association with Bob Dylan and other counterculture figures.

Vivian and Johnny Cash were each harassed by hate mail and death threats. Flyers were distributed at Johnny Cash's concerts urging people to call a phone number that played a reading of the Thunderbolt article; a voice intoned, "the race mixers of this country continue to sell records to your teenage children." They harassed the couple and boycotted the singer in the South.

Saul Holiff, Johnny Cash's manager, met with Robert Shelton, Grand Wizard of the Ku Klux Klan, and threatened a $200,000 lawsuit for harassment. Holiff also contacted national and local newspapers to correct the story; his efforts included a well-received article in the New York Post.

He also arranged to have Vivian Cash's background researched and documented. Specialists noted Vivian's designation as White on her marriage certificate in Texas, a list of the Whites-only schools she had attended in the segregated state, and letters from close associates attesting to their knowledge of her identity. With his wife established as "white", Johnny Cash was judged acceptable and was booked again in venues in the South.

=== Death ===
Vivian died on May 24, 2005, from complications of lung cancer and related surgery.

== Personal life ==
Vivian and Johnny Cash were estranged in 1962. Liberto later said that she had filed for divorce in 1966 because of Cash's severe abuse of alcohol and other drugs, as well as his constant touring and his repeated acts of adultery with other women. He had become particularly close with singer June Carter, whom he later married. Vivian had primary responsibility for the four Cash daughters: Rosanne, who became a major singer-songwriter; Kathy; Cindy, who also became a singer-songwriter/author; and Tara. Two of them followed their father into show business. The next generation also entered show business: Vivian's oldest grandson, Thomas Gabriel, is a singer-songwriter in Nashville, Tennessee. Her grandson Dustin Tittle is a film producer.

In 1968, Liberto married Dick Distin, a police officer in Ventura, California. They were married until her death.

== Memoir ==
In 2002, Vivian was approached by freelance writer and producer Ann Sharpsteen about appearing in a retrospective program about Johnny Cash for VH1. Though she declined the offer, the two women became close friends. Vivian decided to publish her memoirs, hiring Sharpsteen as an editor and biographer. The book was entitled I Walked the Line: My Life With Johnny (2007).

It is based largely on excerpts from the thousands of letters that she exchanged with Johnny Cash during his three-year deployment before their marriage. In addition, it includes her recollections of their courtship and marriage, and Johnny Cash's rise to fame. She also discloses her feelings about June Carter, who married Cash after he and Vivian divorced.

== Genealogy ==
In February 2021, historian Henry Louis Gates Jr., host of the show Finding Your Roots, featured Rosanne Cash as a guest. His researchers had studied both sides of her parents' families through documents and DNA analysis.

They confirmed her mother Vivian Liberto's paternal Sicilian ancestry, documented for 300 years in Cefalù, Sicily. Vivian's grandfather Rosario Liberto arrived in New Orleans in 1895 and migrated to San Antonio, Texas. There he married an Italian woman from his hometown, and founded what became a chain of successful Italian grocery stores.

They found Vivian's known German and Irish ancestors. They also found that one of Vivian's maternal great-great-grandmothers was Sally Shields, a woman of mixed race who was born into slavery in Alabama. Sally's mother was an enslaved African American. Sally's White father and enslaver was William Bryant Shields, a planter born in North Carolina and the son of an Irish immigrant. He also fathered Shields's eight siblings. He used his wealth and political influence to gain an act of the legislature in 1848 to free all nine of his children. At this time the legislature no longer allowed individuals to manumit slaves through private deeds or other such actions. The legislature's act was conditional, stipulating that the Shields's children's 'freedom' was "confined as to residence to the counties of Perry, Dallas and Wilcox". Further, it precluded them from being able to inherit land. Shields was noted in other records as "not recognized in good society," probably because of his acknowledgement of his mixed-race family and efforts on their behalf, in a slave society that did not want to acknowledge such "shadow families".

The show found that Sally Shields had married a White man, Andrew Robinson, in 1838 in Perry County, Alabama. She was still enslaved, so the marriage was ostensibly illegal as slaves were not allowed to marry, but her husband posted a $200 bond to gain registration of the marriage by the county clerk, to make it legal.

With a White father and a mother who was more than half White, the Robinson children were of predominately White ancestry. Their children were classified as Mulatto (or mixed race) in the 1870 census in Texas. Their son Lafayette Robinson was a direct ancestor of Vivian Cash's mother. Like Sarah, the Shields' siblings all married White spouses, as did their descendants.

According to DNA, Rosanne Cash has 3.3% sub-Saharan African ancestry. While the researchers did not find written confirmation, the DNA data indicated that Rosanne has African ancestry on her father's side in addition to that on her mother's side. Through their African ancestry, she (and her sisters) are cousins of actor Angela Bassett.

Originally living near each other in Perry County, most of the grown children of the extended William B. Shields family left Alabama and migrated to Texas, where they were less identifiable as being of mixed race because they were among people who did not know their backgrounds. To avoid being drafted into the Confederacy, the Robinson family and other Shields siblings migrated during the Civil War to Mexico for a time. After the war, they returned to Texas. By the 1930s, the census and death records of Andrew and Sarah (Shields) Robinson's descendants listed them all as White.

According to her official biographer Ann Sharpsteen, and her own words in her 2007 memoir, Vivian Cash strongly identified throughout her life as a White Sicilian American. Cash said in her memoir, "It didn't help that Johnny issued a statement to the KKK informing them that I wasn't black. To this day I hate when accusations and threats from people like that are dignified with any response at all."

== Representation in other media ==
- Rosanne Cash dedicated her album, Black Cadillac to Vivian Liberto, her father, and stepmother, June Carter Cash. The tracks “Burn Down This Town“ and “I Was Watching You” directly reference Vivian.
- Liberto was portrayed in the Cash biopic Walk the Line by actress Ginnifer Goodwin. She was portrayed by Anna Grace Stewart in the CMT miniseries Sun Records.
- Liberto's life was chronicled in the documentary, My Darling Vivian (2020).
