= Johnny Cash =

American country singer (1932–2003)

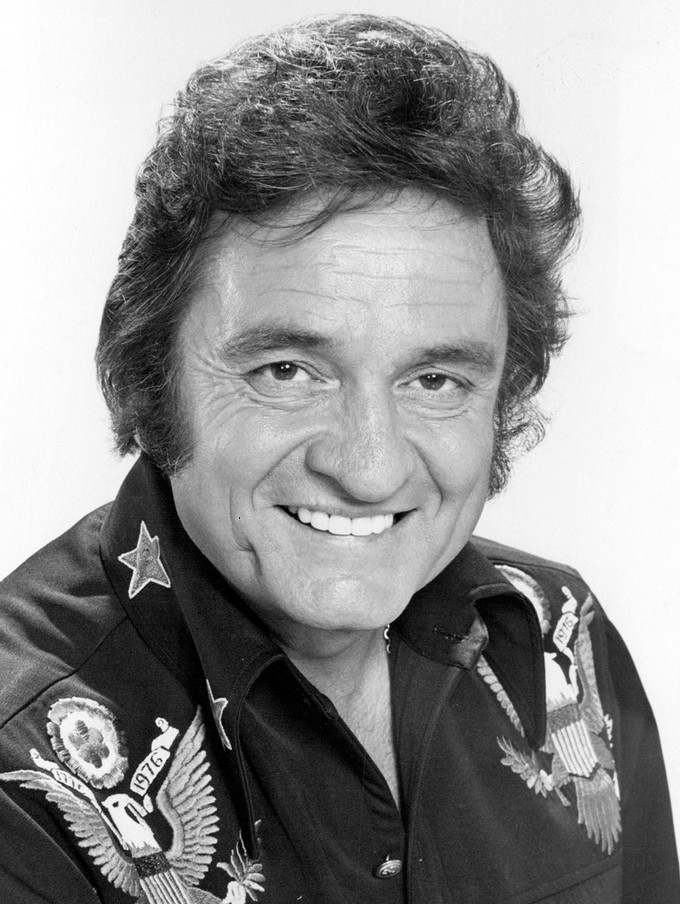
- Cash in 1977
- Born: J. R. Cash; February 26, 1932; Kingsland, Arkansas, U.S.
- Died: September 12, 2003 (aged 71); Nashville, Tennessee, U.S.
- Resting place: Hendersonville Memory Gardens
- Other names: "Man in Black"; John R. Cash
- Occupations: Singer; songwriter; musician; actor
- Years active: 1954–2003
- Spouses: Vivian Liberto (m. 1954; div. 1966) June Carter (m. 1968; died 2003)
- Children: 5, including Rosanne, Cindy and John
- Relatives: Tommy Cash (brother); Thomas Gabriel (grandson)
- Military career
- Allegiance: United States
- Branch: United States Air Force
- Service years: 1950–1954
- Rank: Staff sergeant
- Musical career
- Genres: Country; rockabilly; rock and roll; folk; gospel; blues
- Instruments: Vocals; guitar; harmonica
- Works: Albums; singles; songs
- Labels: Sun; Columbia; Mercury; American Recordings; House of Cash; Legacy
- Formerly of: The Highwaymen
- Website: johnnycash.com

John R. Cash (born J. R. Cash; February 26, 1932 – September 12, 2003) was an American singer-songwriter. Most of his music contains themes of sorrow, moral tribulation, and redemption, especially songs from the later stages of his career. He was known for his deep, calm, bass-baritone voice, (Note: Although Cash's voice type endured over the years, his timbre changed noticeably. Pareles writes: "Through a recording career that stretches back to 1955, Cash's bass-baritone voice has gone from gravelly to grave.") the distinctive sound of his backing band, the Tennessee Three, that was characterized by its train-like chugging guitar rhythms, a rebelliousness coupled with an increasingly somber and humble demeanor, and his free prison concerts. Cash wore a trademark all-black stage wardrobe, which earned him the nickname "Man in Black". (Note: For Cash, black stage attire was a "symbol of rebellion—against a stagnant status quo, against ... hypocritical houses of God, against people whose minds are closed to others' ideas".)

Born to poor cotton farmers in Kingsland, Arkansas, Cash grew up on gospel music and played on a local radio station in high school. He served four years in the Air Force, much of it in West Germany. After his return to the United States, he rose to fame during the mid-1950s in the burgeoning rockabilly scene in Memphis, Tennessee. He traditionally began his concerts by introducing himself with "Hello, I'm Johnny Cash". (Note: Schultz refers to this phrase as Cash's "trademark greeting", and places his utterance of this line, on Cash's At Folsom Prison album, "among the most electrifying [seconds] in the history of concert recording.") He began to follow that by "Folsom Prison Blues", one of his signature songs. His other signature songs include "I Walk the Line", "Ring of Fire", "Get Rhythm", and "Man in Black". He also recorded humorous numbers like "One Piece at a Time" and "A Boy Named Sue", a duet with his future wife June called "Jackson" (followed by many further duets after they married), and railroad songs such as "Hey, Porter", "Orange Blossom Special", and "Rock Island Line". During his final years, Cash covered songs by contemporary rock artists; his covers included "Hurt" by Nine Inch Nails, "Rusty Cage" by Soundgarden, and "Personal Jesus" by Depeche Mode.

Cash is one of the best-selling music artists of all time, having sold more than 90 million records worldwide. His genre-spanning music embraced country, rock and roll, rockabilly, blues, folk, and gospel sounds. This crossover appeal earned him the rare honor of being inducted into the Country Music, Rock and Roll, and Gospel Music Halls of Fame. His life and career were dramatized in the 2005 biopic Walk the Line.

== Early life ==
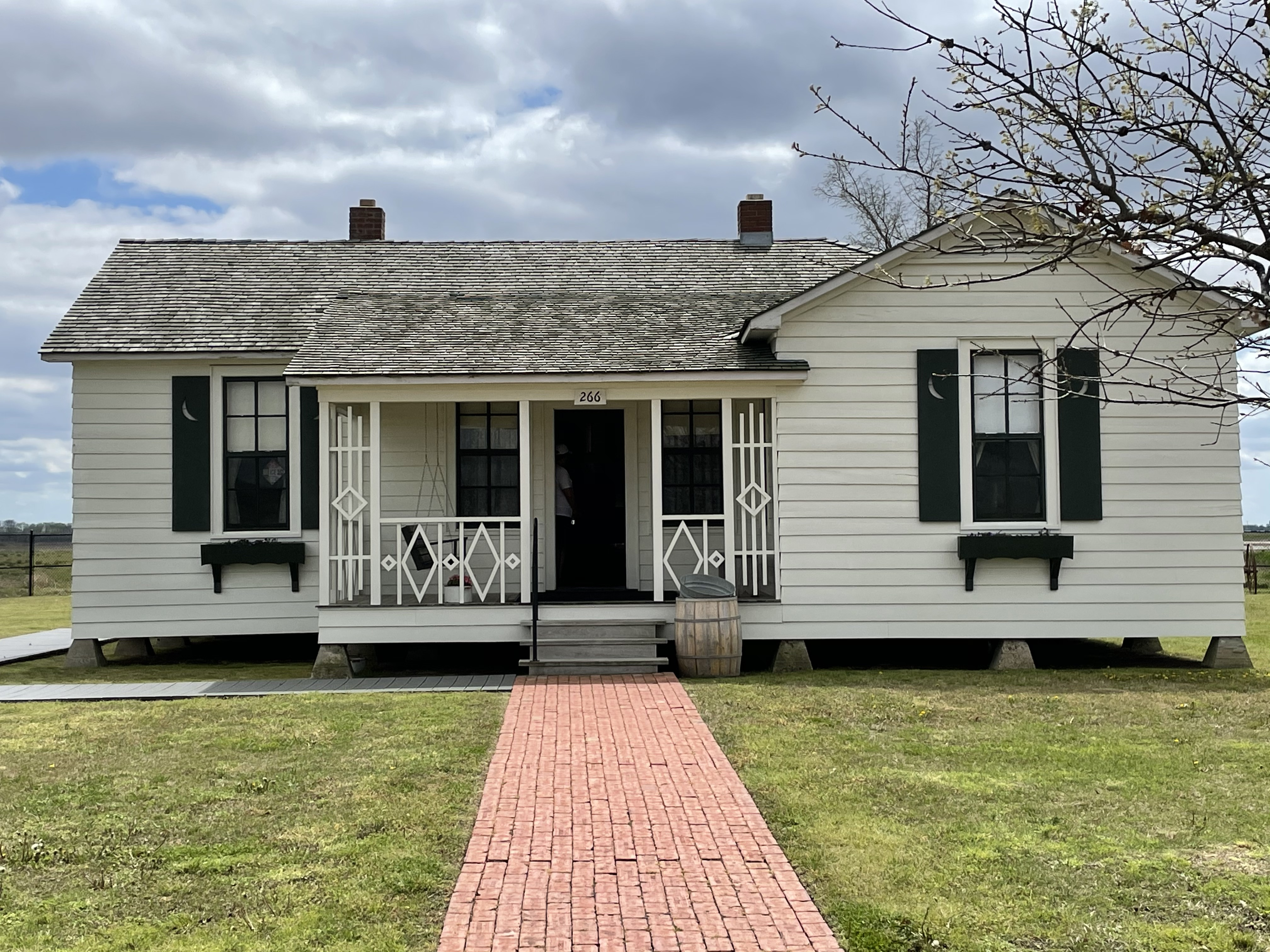
Cash's boyhood home in Dyess, Arkansas, where he lived from the age of three in 1935 until he finished high school in 1950. The property, pictured here in 2021, is listed on the National Register of Historic Places. The home was renovated in 2011 to look as it did when Cash lived there as a child.

J. R. Cash was born on February 26, 1932, in Kingsland, Arkansas, to Carrie Cloveree (née Rivers) and Ray Cash. He had three older siblings, Roy, Margaret Louise, and Jack, and three younger siblings: Reba, Joanne, and Tommy (who also became a successful country artist). Because his mother wanted to name him John and his father preferred Ray, they compromised by giving him the initials "J. R." When Cash enlisted in the Air Force after high school, he was not permitted to use initials as a first name, so he adopted the name "John R. Cash". In 1955, when signing with Sun Records, he began using the name "Johnny Cash".

In March 1935, when Cash was three years old, the family settled in Dyess, Arkansas, a New Deal colony established during the Great Depression under President Franklin D. Roosevelt. The program was intended to give poor families the opportunity to work land they might eventually own. From the age of five, Cash worked in cotton fields with his family, singing with them as they worked. Dyess and the Cash farm suffered a flood during his childhood, an experience he later chronicled in the song "Five Feet High and Rising". His family's economic and personal struggles during the Great Depression gave him a lifelong sympathy for the poor and working class, inspiring many of his songs.

In 1944, Cash's older brother Jack, with whom he was close, was nearly cut in two by an unguarded table saw at work at age 15. He died of his wounds a week later. According to Cash's autobiography, he, his mother, and Jack all had a sense of foreboding about that day; his mother urged Jack to skip work and go fishing with Cash, but Jack insisted on working because the family needed the money. Cash often spoke of the guilt he felt over the incident and said he looked forward to "meeting [his] brother in Heaven".

Cash's early memories were dominated by gospel music and radio. Taught guitar by his mother and a childhood friend, he began playing and writing songs at age 12. As a boy, Cash had a high-tenor voice, which later developed into a bass-baritone after his voice changed. In high school, he sang on a local Arkansas radio station.

Decades later, he released an album of traditional gospel songs called My Mother's Hymn Book. He was also strongly influenced by traditional Irish music, which he heard performed weekly by Dennis Day on the Jack Benny radio program. Another early mentor was Memphis-based African American singer Gus Cannon. In 1997, Cash told NPR journalist Terry Gross that he "sat on the porch" with Cannon "day after day" after arriving in Memphis in 1954.

Cash enlisted in the Air Force on July 7, 1950, shortly after the start of the Korean War. After basic training at Lackland Air Force Base and technical training at Brooks Air Force Base, both in San Antonio, Texas, he was assigned to the 12th Radio Squadron Mobile of the U.S. Air Force Security Service at Landsberg, West Germany. He worked there as a Morse code operator, intercepting Soviet Army transmissions. While working this job, Cash was said to be one of the first Americans to learn of Joseph Stalin's death, receiving the news via Morse code. His daughter later said Cash had recounted the story many times over the years. While at Landsberg, he formed his first band, "The Landsberg Barbarians". On July 3, 1954, he was honorably discharged as a staff sergeant and returned to Texas. During his military service, he acquired a distinctive scar on the right side of his jaw from surgery to remove a cyst.

=== Ancestry ===
Cash was primarily of English and Scottish descent.

His paternal grandmother claimed Cherokee ancestry, but a 2021 DNA test of Cash's daughter Rosanne on Finding Your Roots, hosted by historian Henry Louis Gates Jr, found no known Native American markers. Gates said researchers instead identified sub-Saharan African DNA on her paternal side, originating from an unknown African ancestor. (Note: The researchers found Rosanne Cash has 3.3% Sub-Saharan African DNA. On her maternal side, they found enslaved ancestors: her "third great-grand-mother" Sarah A. Shields was born enslaved. Her mother was enslaved, and researchers said she could have been of "full African descent".)

Later in life, Cash met with Major Michael Crichton‑Stuart, then-laird of Falkland in Fife, and became increasingly interested in his Scots ancestry. He traced his Scottish surname to 11th-century Fife. Cash Loch and other locations in Fife are named after distant ancestors.

Cash learned that he descended from a man named William Cash who lived in the village of Strathmiglo, and that the surname Cash linked to the ancient Scottish Highland Clan MacTavish. The Cash surname is a direct translation or altered form of the Scottish surname MacTavish.

He is a distant cousin of British Conservative politician Sir William Cash.

== Career ==
=== Early career ===
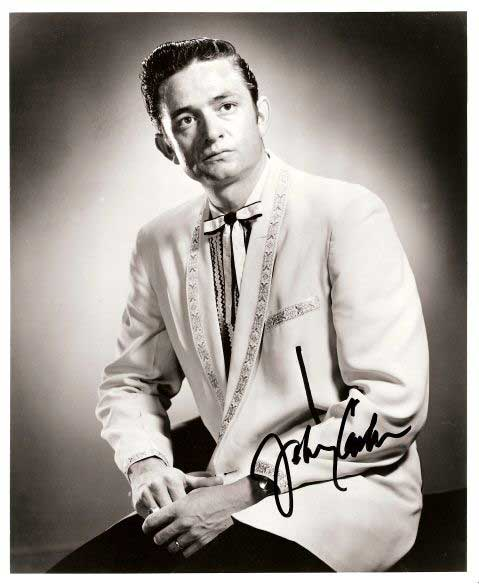
Publicity photo for Sun Records, 1955

In 1954, Cash moved to Memphis, Tennessee. He sold appliances while studying to be a radio announcer. At night, he played with guitarist Luther Perkins and bassist Marshall Grant. Perkins and Grant were known as the Tennessee Two. Cash worked up the courage to visit the Sun Records studio, hoping to get a recording contract. He auditioned for Sam Phillips by singing mostly gospel songs, only to learn from the producer that he no longer recorded gospel music. Phillips was rumored to have told Cash to "go home and sin, then come back with a song I can sell". In a 2002 interview, Cash denied that Phillips made any such comment. Cash eventually won over the producer with new songs delivered in his early rockabilly style. In 1955, Cash made his first recordings at Sun, "Hey, Porter" and "Cry! Cry! Cry!", which were released in late June and met with success on the country hit parade.

On December 4, 1956, Elvis Presley dropped in on Phillips while Carl Perkins was in the studio cutting new tracks, with Jerry Lee Lewis backing him on piano. Cash was also in the studio, and the four started an impromptu jam session. Phillips left the tapes running and the recordings, almost half of which were gospel songs, survived. They have since been released under the title Million Dollar Quartet. In Cash: the Autobiography, Cash wrote that he was the farthest from the microphone and sang in a higher pitch to blend in with Presley.

Cash's next record, "Folsom Prison Blues", made the country top five. His "I Walk the Line" became number one on the country charts and entered the pop charts top 20. "Home of the Blues" followed, recorded in July 1957. That same year, Cash became the first Sun artist to release a long-playing album. Although he was Sun's most consistently selling and prolific artist at that time, Cash felt constrained by his contract with the small label. Phillips did not want Cash to record gospel and was paying him a 3% royalty rather than the standard rate of 5%. Presley had already left Sun, and Cash felt that Phillips was focusing most of his attention and promotion on Lewis.

In 1958, Cash left Phillips to sign a lucrative offer with Columbia Records. His single "Don't Take Your Guns to Town" became one of his biggest hits. He recorded a collection of gospel songs for his second album for Columbia. However, Cash left behind such a backlog of recordings with Sun that Phillips continued to release new singles and albums featuring previously unreleased material until as late as 1964. Cash was in the unusual position of having new releases out on two labels concurrently. Sun's 1960 release, a cover of "Oh Lonesome Me", made it to number 13 on the C&W charts. (Note: When RCA Victor signed Presley, it had also bought his Sun Records masters, but when Cash departed for Columbia, Phillips retained the rights to the singer's Sun masters. Columbia eventually licensed some of these recordings for release on compilations after Cash's death.)

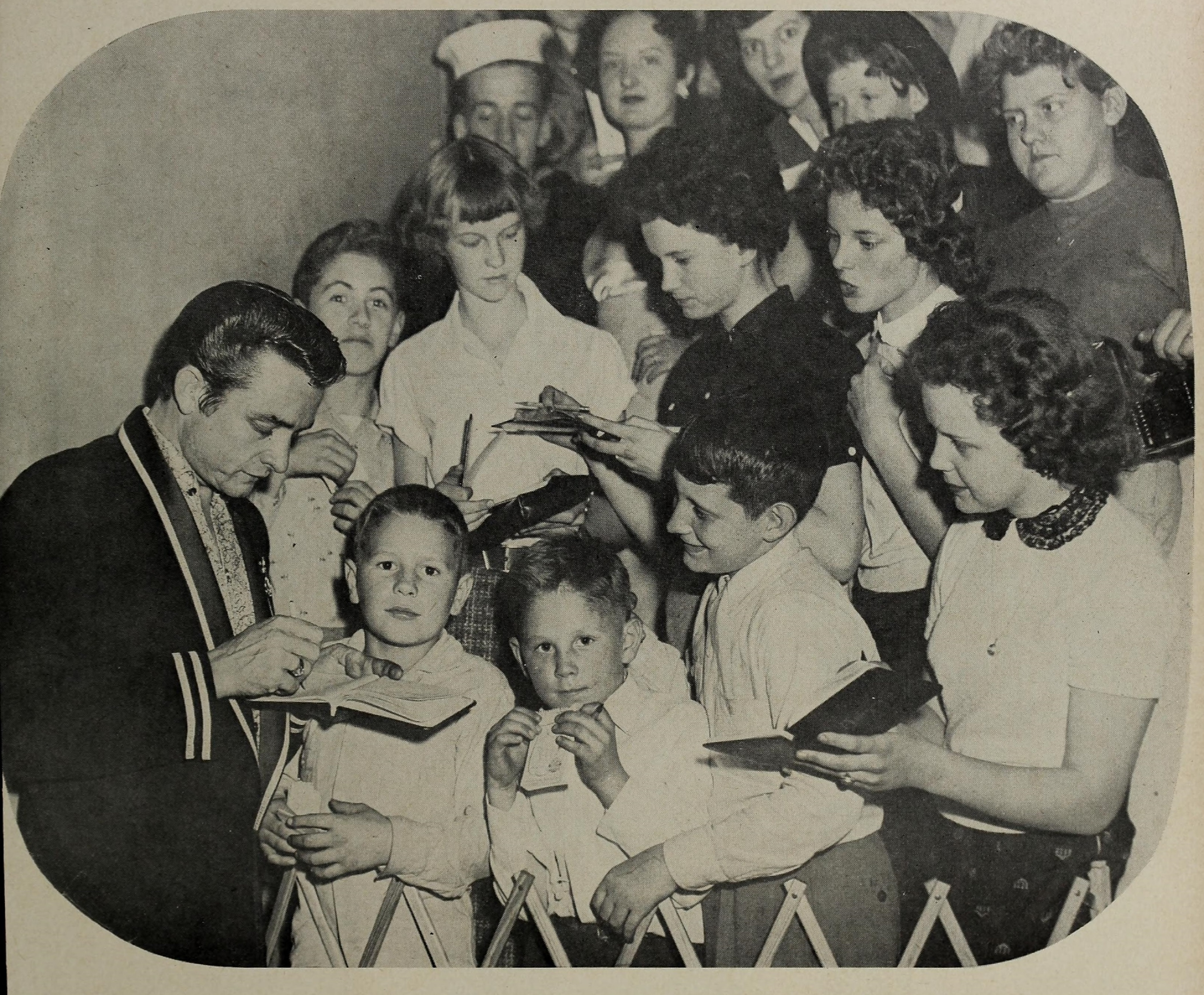
Cash on the cover of Cash Box magazine, September 7, 1957

Early in his career, Cash was given the teasing nickname "the Undertaker" by fellow artists because of his habit of wearing black clothes. He said he chose them because they were easier to keep looking clean on long tours.

In the early 1960s, Cash toured with the Carter Family, which by this time regularly included Mother Maybelle's daughters, Anita, June, and Helen. June later recalled admiring him from afar during these tours.

In the 1960s, he appeared on Pete Seeger's short-lived television series Rainbow Quest.

Cash's career was handled by Saul Holiff, a London, Ontario, promoter. Their relationship was the subject of Holiff's son's biopic My Father and the Man in Black (2012).

=== Outlaw image ===
As his career was taking off in the late 1950s, Cash started drinking heavily and became addicted to amphetamines and barbiturates. For a brief time, he shared an apartment in Nashville with Waylon Jennings, who was deeply addicted to amphetamines. Cash would use the stimulants to stay awake during tours. Friends joked about his "nervousness" and erratic behavior, many ignoring the warning signs of his worsening drug addiction.

Although he was in many ways spiraling out of control, Cash could still deliver hits due to his frenetic creativity. His rendition of "Ring of Fire" was a crossover hit, reaching number one on the country charts and entering the top 20 on the pop charts. It was originally performed by June Carter's sister, but the signature mariachi-style horn arrangement was provided by Cash. He said that it had come to him in a dream.

His first wife Vivian (Liberto) Cash claimed a different version of the origins of "Ring of Fire". In her book, I Walked the Line: My Life with Johnny (2007), Liberto says that Cash gave Carter half the songwriting credit for monetary reasons.

In June 1965, Cash's camper caught fire during a fishing trip with his nephew Damon Fielder in Los Padres National Forest in California. It set off a forest fire that burned several hundred acres and nearly caused his death. Cash claimed that the fire was caused by sparks from a defective exhaust system on his camper, but Fielder thought that Cash started a fire to stay warm and, under the influence of drugs, failed to notice the fire getting out of control. When the judge asked Cash why he did it, Cash said, "I didn't do it, my truck did, and it's dead, so you can't question it."

The fire destroyed 508 acres (206 ha), burned the foliage off three mountains and drove off 49 of the refuge's 53 endangered California condors. Cash was unrepentant and said, "I don't care about your damn yellow buzzards." The federal government sued him and was awarded $125,172. Cash eventually settled the case and paid $82,001.

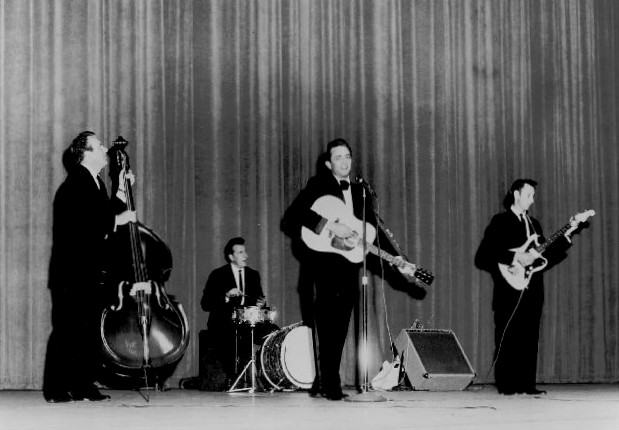
The Tennessee Three with Cash in 1963

Although Cash cultivated a romantic outlaw image, he never served a prison sentence. Despite landing in jail seven times for misdemeanors, he was held only one night each time. On May 11, 1965, he was arrested in Starkville, Mississippi, for trespassing late at night onto private property to pick flowers. (He used this incident as the basis for the song "Starkville City Jail". He discussed this on his live At San Quentin album.)

While on tour later that year, he was arrested October 4 in El Paso, Texas, by a narcotics squad. The officers suspected he was smuggling heroin from Mexico, but found instead 688 Dexedrine capsules (amphetamines) and 475 Equanil (sedatives or tranquilizers) tablets hidden inside his guitar case. Because the pills were prescription drugs rather than illegal narcotics, Cash received a suspended sentence. He posted a $1,500 bond and was released until his arraignment.

In this period of the mid-1960s, Cash released a number of concept albums. His Bitter Tears (1964) was devoted to spoken word and songs addressing the plight of Native Americans and mistreatment by the government. While initially reaching charts, this album met with resistance from some fans and radio stations, which rejected its controversial take on social issues.

In 2011, a book was published about it, leading to a re-recording of the songs by contemporary artists and the making of a documentary film about Cash's efforts with the album. This film was aired on PBS in February and November 2016. His Sings the Ballads of the True West (1965) was an experimental double record, mixing authentic frontier songs with Cash's spoken narration.

Reaching a low with his severe drug addiction and destructive behavior, Cash and his first wife divorced after having separated in 1962. Some venues canceled his performances, but he continued to find success. In 1967, Cash's duet with June Carter, "Jackson", won a Grammy Award.

Cash was last arrested in 1967 in Walker County, Georgia, after police found he was carrying a bag of prescription pills when in a car accident. Cash attempted to bribe a local deputy, who turned the money down. He was jailed for the night in LaFayette, Georgia. Sheriff Ralph Jones released him after giving him a long talk, warning him about the danger of his behavior and wasted potential. Cash credited that experience with helping him turn around and save his life. He later returned to LaFayette to play a benefit concert; it attracted 12,000 people (the city population was less than 9,000 at the time) and raised $75,000 for the high school.

Reflecting on his past in a 1997 interview, Cash noted: "I was taking the pills for awhile, and then the pills started taking me." June, Maybelle, and Ezra Carter moved into Cash's mansion for a month to help him get off drugs. Cash proposed onstage to June on February 22, 1968, at a concert at the London Gardens in London, Ontario, Canada. The couple married a week later (on March 1) in Franklin, Kentucky. She had agreed to marry Cash after he had "cleaned up."

Cash's journey included rediscovery of his Christian faith. He took an "altar call" in Evangel Temple, a small church in the Nashville area, pastored by Reverend Jimmie Rodgers Snow, son of country music legend Hank Snow. According to Marshall Grant, though, Cash did not completely stop using amphetamines in 1968; and did not fully end drug use for another two years. He was drug-free for a period of seven years. In his memoir about time with Cash, Grant said that the birth of Cash's son, John Carter Cash, inspired the singer to end his dependence.

Cash began using amphetamines again in 1977. By 1983, he was deeply addicted again. He entered rehab at the Betty Ford Clinic in Rancho Mirage for treatment. He stayed off drugs for several years, but relapsed.

In 1989, he entered Nashville's Cumberland Heights Alcohol and Drug Treatment Center. In 1992, he started care at the Loma Linda Behavioral Medicine Center in Loma Linda, California, for his final rehabilitation treatment. (Several months later, his son followed him into this facility for treatment.)

=== Folsom and other prison concerts ===
In the late 1950s Cash began performing concerts at prisons. He played his first notable prison concert on January 1, 1958, at San Quentin State Prison in California. These performances were recorded live, and released on highly successful albums: Johnny Cash at Folsom Prison (1968) and Johnny Cash at San Quentin (1969). Both live albums reached number one on Billboard country album music and the latter crossed over to reach the top of the Billboard pop album chart. In 1969, Cash became an international hit when he eclipsed even the Beatles by selling 6.5 million albums. In comparison, the prison concerts were much more successful than his later live albums such as Strawberry Cake recorded in London and Live at Madison Square Garden, which peaked at numbers 33 and 39 on the album charts, respectively.

The Folsom Prison record was introduced by a rendition of his "Folsom Prison Blues", while the San Quentin record included the crossover hit single "A Boy Named Sue", a Shel Silverstein novelty song that reached number one on the country charts and number two on the U.S. top-10 pop charts.

In 1972 Cash performed at the Österåker Prison in Sweden. The live album På Österåker (At Österåker) was released in 1973. "San Quentin" was recorded with Cash replacing "San Quentin" with "Österåker". In 1976, a concert at Tennessee State Prison was videotaped for TV broadcast. It was posthumously released after Cash's death as a CD entitled A Concert Behind Prison Walls.

Cash placed great value upon patriotism and national service. Given his own service, Cash also supported his nephew, Captain Roy "Outlaw" Cash Jr., USN. On St. Patrick's Day, March 17, 1975, Cash diverted between scheduled performances to play a special concert along with The Tennessee Three for a military audience at the Naval War College in Rhode Island. June Carter Cash and Carl Lee Perkins joined Cash and the Tennessee Three for the show. Before taking the stage, Cash warmed up with June and Perkins under the historic rotunda in Mahan Hall at the Naval War College. The recording of this "lost concert" of Cash show was donated by Captain Roy Cash Jr., who later collaborated with Naval War College historian, David Kohnen, to write the account of the performance, which had previously remained undocumented in the official chronology of performances by Cash.

=== Activism for Native Americans ===
Cash used his stardom and economic status to bring awareness to the issues surrounding the Native American people. Cash sang songs about indigenous humanity in an effort to confront the U.S. government. Many non-Native Americans did not address those topics in their music. In 1965, Cash and June Carter appeared on Pete Seeger's TV show, Rainbow Quest, on which Cash explained his start as an activist for Native Americans:

In '57, I wrote a song called "Old Apache Squaw" and then forgot the so-called Indian protest for a while, but nobody else seemed to speak up with any volume of voice.

Columbia Music, the label for which Cash was recording then, was opposed to putting the song on his next album, considering it "too radical for the public". Cash singing songs of Indian tragedy and settler violence went radically against the mainstream of country music in the 1950s, which was dominated by the image of the righteous cowboy who makes the native's soil his own.

In 1964, coming off the chart success of his previous album I Walk the Line, he recorded the aforementioned album Bitter Tears: Ballads of the American Indian.

The album featured stories of a multitude of Indigenous peoples, emphasizing their violent oppression by white settlers: the Pima people ("The Ballad of Ira Hayes"), Navajo ("Navajo"), Apache ("Apache Tears"), Lakota ("Big Foot"), Seneca ("As Long as the Grass Shall Grow"), and Cherokee ("The Talking Leaves"). Cash wrote three of the songs himself and one with the help of Johnny Horton.

The majority of these protest songs were written by folk artist Peter La Farge (son of Oliver La Farge, an activist and Pulitzer prizewinner). Cash met the younger La Farge in New York in the 1960s and admired him for his activism. The album's single, "The Ballad of Ira Hayes" was generally not played by commercial radio. (Ira Hayes was a Native American who was one of the six soldiers featured in a photo raising the U.S. flag at Iwo Jima during World War II.)

The record label denied it promotion due to what it considered a provocative and "unappealing" nature. Cash faced resistance and was urged by an editor of a country music magazine to leave the Country Music Association, who said: "You and your crowd are just too intelligent to associate with plain country folks, country artists, and country DJs."

In reaction, on August 22, 1964, Cash posted a letter as an advertisement in Billboard, calling the record industry cowardly: "D.J.s – station managers – owners [...] where are your guts? I had to fight back when I realized that so many stations are afraid of Ira Hayes. Just one question: WHY??? Ira Hayes is strong medicine [...] So is Rochester, Harlem, Birmingham and Vietnam." Cash kept promoting the song and persuaded disc jockeys he knew to play it. The song eventually reached number three on the country charts, and the album rose to number two on the album charts.

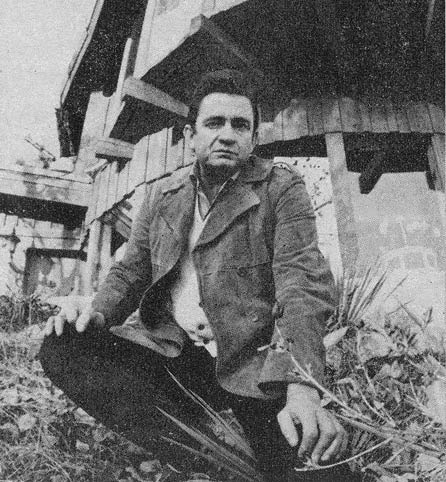
Cash in 1969

Later, on The Johnny Cash Show, he continued telling stories of Native-American plight, both in song and through short films, such as the history of the Trail of Tears.

In 1966, in recognition of his activism, Cash was adopted by the Seneca Nation's Turtle Clan. He performed benefits in 1968 at the Rosebud Reservation, close to the historical landmark of the massacre at Wounded Knee, to raise money to help build a school. He also played at the D-Q University in the 1980s.

In 1970, Cash recorded a reading of John G. Burnett's 1890, 80th-birthday essay on Cherokee removal for the Historical Landmarks Association (Nashville).

=== The Johnny Cash Show ===
From June 1969 to March 1971, Cash starred in his own television show, The Johnny Cash Show, on the ABC network. Produced by Screen Gems, the show was performed at the Ryman Auditorium in Nashville. The Statler Brothers opened for him in every episode; the Carter Family and rockabilly legend Carl Perkins were also part of the regular show entourage. Cash also enjoyed booking mainstream performers as guests; including Linda Ronstadt in her first TV appearance, Neil Young, Louis Armstrong, Neil Diamond, Kenny Rogers and the First Edition (who appeared four times), James Taylor, Ray Charles, Roger Miller, Roy Orbison, Derek and the Dominos, Joni Mitchell, and Bob Dylan.

From September 15–18, 1969, in Albuquerque, New Mexico, Cash performed four concerts at the New Mexico State Fair to promote the first season of The Johnny Cash Show. These live shows were produced with help from ABC and local concert producer Bennie Sanchez; during these sets, Johnny Cash and Al Hurricane performed together.

Also during The Johnny Cash Show era, he contributed the title song and other songs to the film Little Fauss and Big Halsy, which starred Robert Redford, Michael J. Pollard, and Lauren Hutton. The title song, "The Ballad of Little Fauss and Big Halsy", written by Carl Perkins, was nominated for the Golden Globe Awards in 1971.

Cash had first met with Dylan in the mid-1960s and became neighbors in the late 1960s in Woodstock, New York. Cash was enthusiastic about reintroducing the reclusive Dylan to his audience. Cash sang a duet with Dylan, "Girl from the North Country", on Dylan's country album Nashville Skyline and also wrote the album's Grammy-winning liner notes.

Another artist who received a major career boost from The Johnny Cash Show was Kris Kristofferson, who was beginning to make a name for himself as a singer-songwriter. During a live performance of Kristofferson's "Sunday Mornin' Comin' Down", Cash refused to change the lyrics to suit network executives, singing the song with its references to marijuana intact:

On a Sunday morning sidewalk
I'm wishin', Lord, that I was stoned.

The closing program of The Johnny Cash Show was a gospel music special. Guests included the Blackwood Brothers, Mahalia Jackson, Stuart Hamblen, and Billy Graham.

=== The "Man in Black" ===
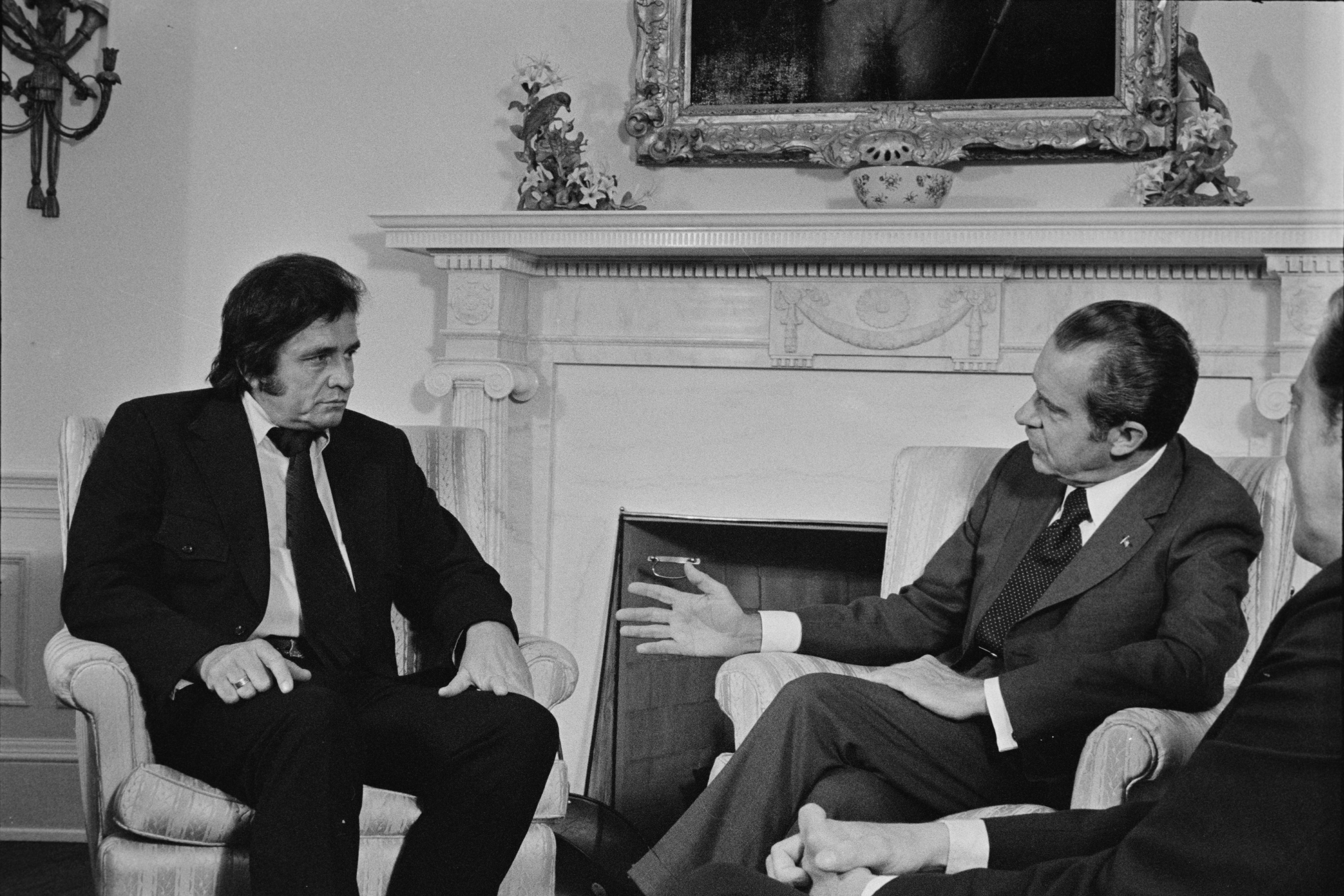
Cash promoting prison reform during his meeting with President Richard Nixon in the Oval Office at the White House in July 1972

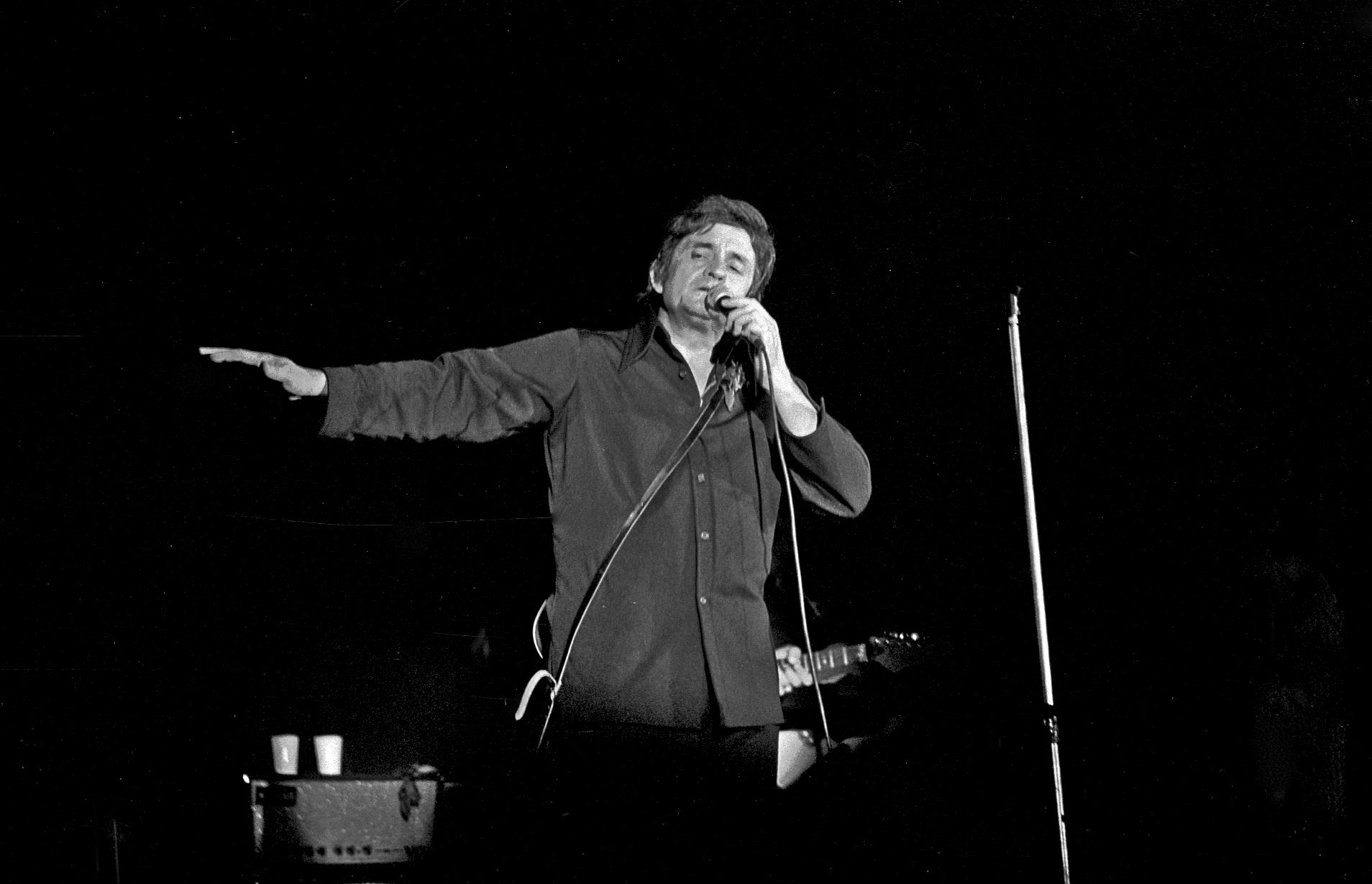
Cash performing in Bremen, West Germany, in September 1972

By the early 1970s, Cash had established his public image as the "Man in Black". He regularly performed in entirely black suits with a long, black, knee-length coat. This outfit stood in contrast to the rhinestone suits and cowboy boots worn by most of the major country acts of his day.

Cash said he wore all black on behalf of the poor and hungry, the "prisoner who has long paid for his crime", and those who have been betrayed by age or drugs. He added, "With the Vietnam War as painful in my mind as it was in most other Americans, I wore it 'in mourning' for the lives that could have been' ... Apart from the Vietnam War being over, I don't see much reason to change my position ... The old are still neglected, the poor are still poor, the young are still dying before their time, and we're not making many moves to make things right. There's still plenty of darkness to carry off."

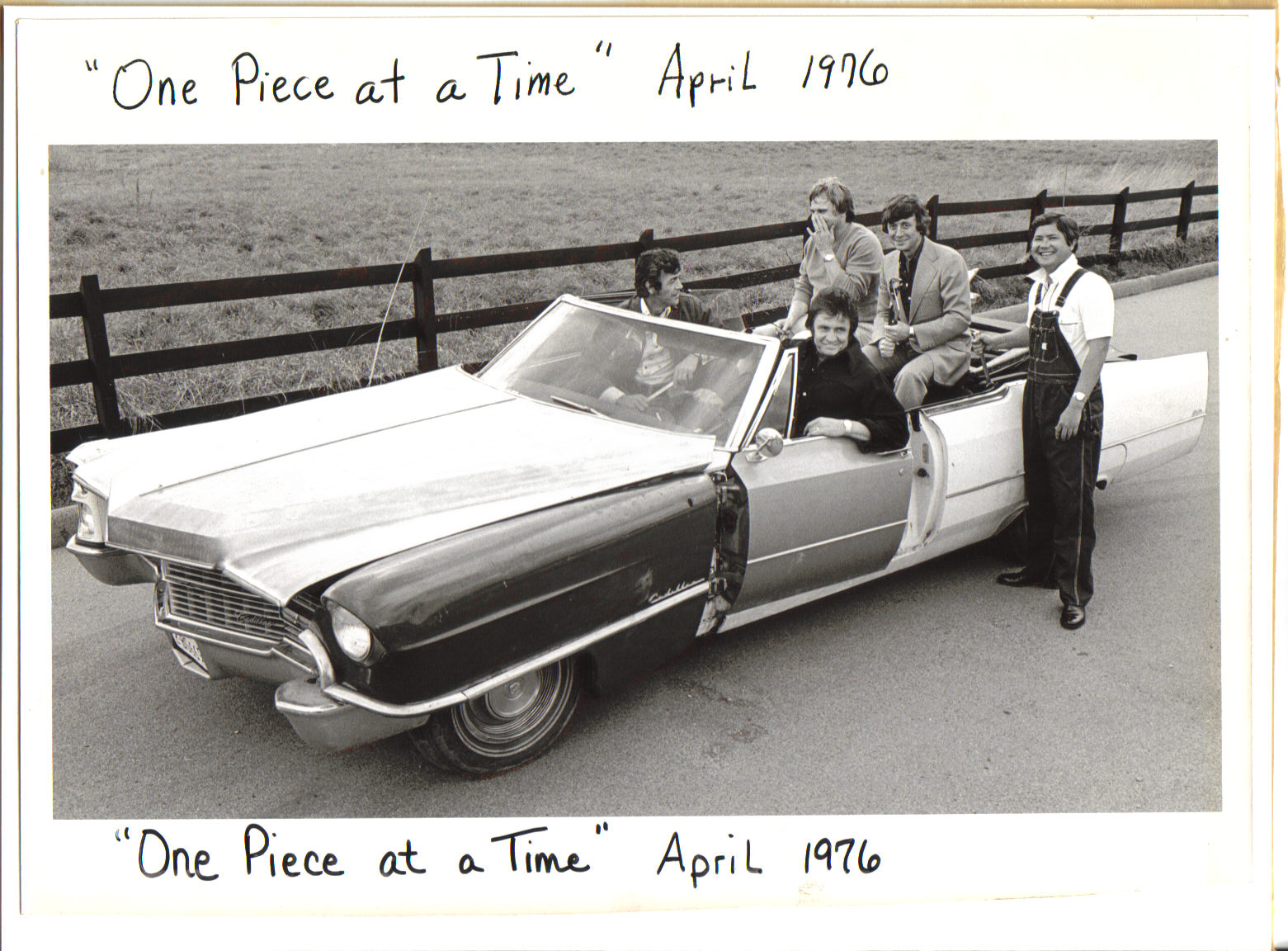
Cash in the "one piece at a time" Cadillac

Initially, he and his band had worn black shirts because that was the only matching color they had among their various outfits. He wore other colors on stage early in his career, but he claimed to like wearing black both on and off stage. He stated that political reasons aside, he simply liked black as his on-stage color. The outdated US Navy's winter blue uniform used to be referred to by sailors as "Johnny Cashes", as the uniform's shirt, tie, and trousers are solid black.

In the mid-1970s, Cash's popularity and number of hit songs began to decline. He made commercials for Amoco and STP, an unpopular enterprise at the time of the 1970s energy crisis. In 1976, he made commercials for Lionel Trains, for which he also wrote the music. However, his first autobiography, Man in Black, was published in 1975 and sold 1.3 million copies. A second, Cash: The Autobiography, appeared in 1997.

Cash's friendship with Billy Graham led to his production of a film about the life of Jesus, Gospel Road: A Story of Jesus, which Cash co-wrote and narrated. It was released in 1973. Cash viewed the film as a statement of his personal faith rather than a means of proselytizing.

Cash and June Carter Cash appeared several times on the Billy Graham Crusade TV specials, and Cash continued to include gospel and religious songs on many of his albums, though Columbia declined to release A Believer Sings the Truth, a gospel double-LP Cash recorded in 1979 and which ended up being released on an independent label even with Cash still under contract to Columbia. On November 22, 1974, CBS ran his one-hour TV special entitled Riding The Rails, a musical history of trains.

He continued to appear on television, hosting Christmas specials on CBS in the late 1970s and early 1980s. Later television appearances included a starring role in an episode of Columbo, entitled "Swan Song". June and he appeared in an episode of Little House on the Prairie, entitled "The Collection". He gave a performance as abolitionist John Brown in the 1985 American Civil War television miniseries North and South. In the 1990s, Johnny and June appeared in Dr. Quinn, Medicine Woman in recurring roles.

He was friendly with every US president, starting with Richard Nixon. He was closest to Jimmy Carter, with whom he became close friends and who was a distant cousin of his wife, June.

When invited to perform at the White House for the first time in 1970, Richard Nixon's office requested that he play "Okie from Muskogee" (a satirical Merle Haggard song about people who despised hippies, young drug users and Vietnam war protesters), "Welfare Cadillac" (a Guy Drake song which chastises the integrity of welfare recipients), and "A Boy Named Sue". Cash declined to play the first two and instead selected other songs, including "The Ballad of Ira Hayes" and his own compositions, "What Is Truth" and "Man in Black". Cash wrote that the reasons for denying Nixon's song choices were not knowing them and having fairly short notice to rehearse them, rather than any political reason. However, Cash added, even if Nixon's office had given Cash enough time to learn and rehearse the songs, their choice of pieces that conveyed "antihippie and antiblack" sentiments might have backfired. In his remarks when introducing Cash, Nixon joked that one thing he had learned about him was one did not tell him what to sing.

Johnny Cash was the grand marshal of the United States Bicentennial parade. He wore a shirt from Nudie Cohn which sold for $25,000 in auction in 2010. After the parade he gave a concert at the Washington Monument.

=== Highwaymen and departure from Columbia records ===
The Highwaymen members Kris Kristofferson, Johnny Cash, Waylon Jennings, Willie Nelson

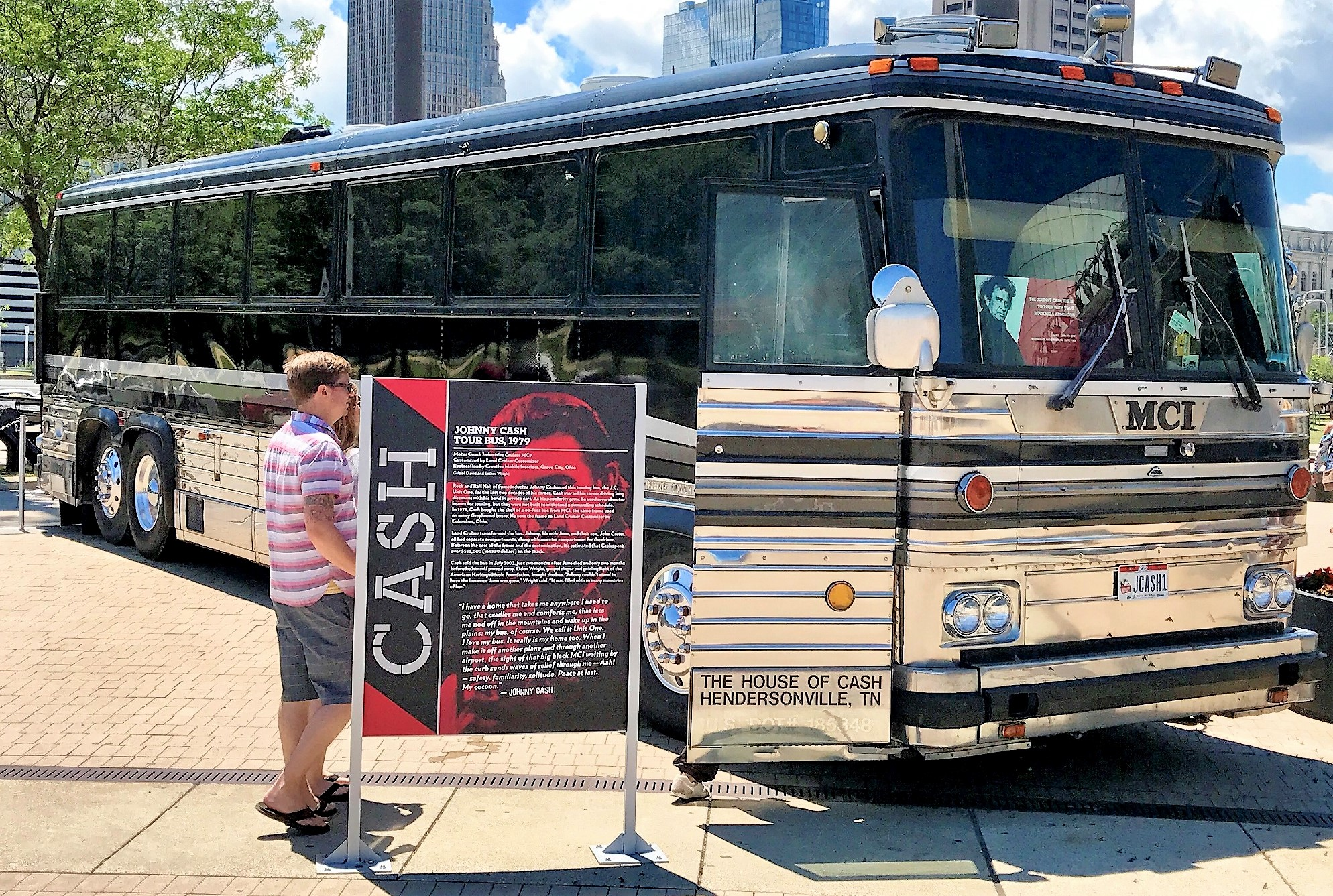
Cash's tour bus

In 1980, Cash became the Country Music Hall of Fame's youngest living inductee at age 48, but during the 1980s, his records failed to make a major impact on the country charts, although he continued to tour successfully. In the mid-1980s, he recorded and toured with Waylon Jennings, Willie Nelson, and Kris Kristofferson as the Highwaymen, making three hit albums, which were released beginning with the originally titled Highwayman in 1985, followed by Highwaymen 2 in 1990, and concluding with Highwaymen – The Road Goes On Forever in 1995.

During that period, Cash appeared in a number of television films. In 1981, he starred in The Pride of Jesse Hallam, winning fine reviews for a film that called attention to adult illiteracy. In 1983, he appeared as a heroic sheriff in Murder in Coweta County, based on a real-life Georgia murder case, which co-starred Andy Griffith as his nemesis.

Cash relapsed into addiction after being administered painkillers for a serious abdominal injury in 1983 caused by an incident in which he was kicked and wounded by an ostrich on his farm.

At a hospital visit in 1988, this time to watch over Waylon Jennings (who was recovering from a heart attack), Jennings suggested that Cash have himself checked into the hospital for his own heart condition. Doctors recommended preventive heart surgery, and Cash underwent double bypass surgery in the same hospital. Both recovered, although Cash refused to use any prescription painkillers, fearing a relapse into dependency. Cash later claimed that during his operation, he had what is called a "near-death experience".

In 1984, Cash released a self-parody recording titled "The Chicken in Black" about Cash's brain being transplanted into a chicken and Cash receiving a bank robber's brain in return. Biographer Robert Hilburn, in his 2013 book Johnny Cash: The Life, disputes the claim made that Cash chose to record an intentionally poor song in protest of Columbia's treatment of him. On the contrary, Hilburn writes, it was Columbia that presented Cash with the song, which Cash – who had previously scored major chart hits with comedic material such as "A Boy Named Sue" and "One Piece at a Time" – accepted enthusiastically, performing the song live on stage and filming a comedic music video in which he dresses up in a superhero-like bank-robber costume. According to Hilburn, Cash's enthusiasm for the song waned after Waylon Jennings told Cash he looked "like a buffoon" in the music video (which was showcased during Cash's 1984 Christmas TV special), and Cash subsequently demanded that Columbia withdraw the music video from broadcast and recall the single from stores—interrupting its bona fide chart success—and termed the venture "a fiasco".

Between 1981 and 1984, he recorded several sessions with famed countrypolitan producer Billy Sherrill (who also produced "The Chicken in Black"), which were shelved; they were released by Columbia's sister label, Legacy Recordings, in 2014 as Out Among the Stars. Around this time, Cash also recorded an album of gospel recordings that ended up being released by another label around the time of his departure from Columbia (this due to Columbia closing down its Priority Records division that was to have released the recordings).

After more unsuccessful recordings were released between 1984 and 1985, Cash left Columbia.

In 1986, Cash returned to Sun Studios in Memphis to team up with Roy Orbison, Jerry Lee Lewis, and Carl Perkins to create the album Class of '55; according to Hilburn, Columbia still had Cash under contract at the time, so special arrangements had to be made to allow him to participate. Also in 1986, Cash published his only novel, Man in White, a book about Saul and his conversion to become the Apostle Paul. He recorded Johnny Cash Reads The Complete New Testament in 1990.

=== American Recordings ===
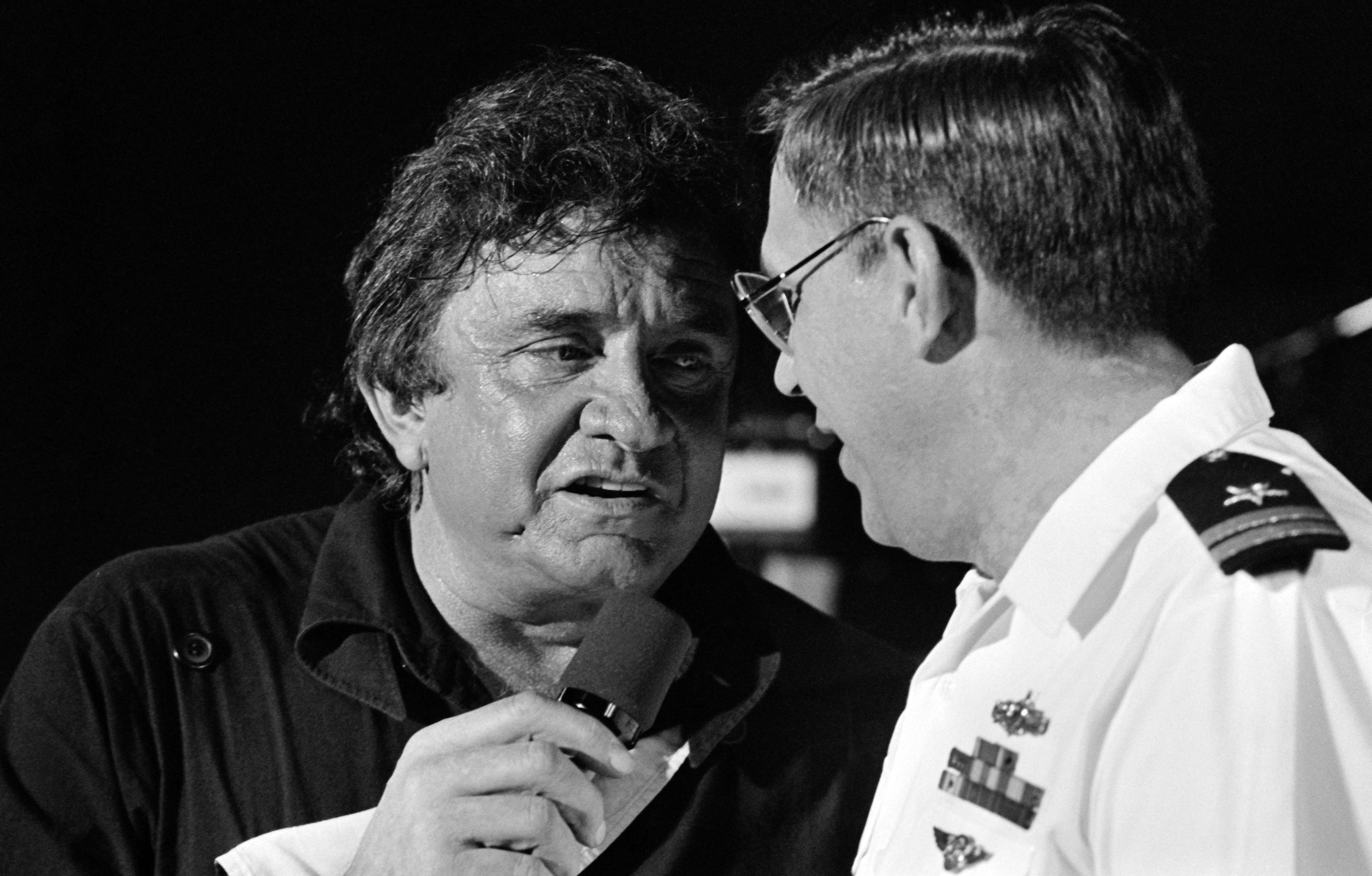
Cash singing with U.S. Navy lieutenant during a military event, c. January 1987

After Columbia Records dropped Cash from his recording contract, he had a short and unsuccessful stint with Mercury Records from 1987 to 1991. During this time, he recorded an album of new versions of some of his best-known Sun and Columbia hits, as well as Water from the Wells of Home, a duets album that paired him with, among others, his children Rosanne Cash and John Carter Cash, as well as Paul McCartney. A one-off Christmas album recorded for Delta Records followed his Mercury contract.

Although Cash did not secure another charting single from 1991 until his death, his collaboration with producer Rick Rubin rejuvenated his career in the 1990s, earning him a dedicated following among alternative, rock, and younger audiences not traditionally associated with country music. In 1988, British post-punk musicians Marc Riley (formerly of the Fall) and Jon Langford (the Mekons) put together 'Til Things Are Brighter, a tribute album featuring mostly British-based indie-rock acts' interpretations of Cash's songs. Cash was enthusiastic about the project, telling Langford that it was a "morale booster"; Rosanne Cash later said "he felt a real connection with those musicians and very validated ... It was very good for him: he was in his element. He absolutely understood what they were tapping into, and loved it". The album attracted press attention on both sides of the Atlantic. In 1991, he sang a version of "Man in Black" for the Christian punk band One Bad Pig's album I Scream Sunday. In 1993, he sang "The Wanderer", the closing track of U2's album Zooropa.

According to Rolling Stone writer Adam Gold, "The Wanderer", written for Cash by Bono, "defies both the U2 and Cash canons, combining rhythmic and textural elements of Nineties synth-pop with a Countrypolitan lament fit for the closing credits of a Seventies western."

No longer sought after by major labels, he was offered a contract with Rubin's American Recordings label, which had recently been rebranded from Def American, under which name it was better known for rap and hard rock. Under Rubin's supervision, he recorded American Recordings (1994) in his living room, accompanied only by his Martin Dreadnought guitar – one of many Cash played throughout his career. The album featured covers of contemporary artists selected by Rubin. The album had a great deal of critical and commercial success, winning a Grammy for Best Contemporary Folk Album. Cash wrote that his reception at the 1994 Glastonbury Festival was one of the highlights of his career. This was the beginning of a decade of music industry accolades and commercial success. He teamed up with Brooks & Dunn to contribute "Folsom Prison Blues" to the AIDS benefit album Red Hot + Country produced by the Red Hot Organization. On the same album, he performed Bob Dylan's "Forever Young".

Cash and his wife appeared on a number of episodes of the television series Dr. Quinn, Medicine Woman. He also lent his voice for a cameo role in The Simpsons episode "El Viaje Misterioso de Nuestro Jomer (The Mysterious Voyage of Homer)", as the "Space Coyote" that guides Homer Simpson on a spiritual quest. In the 2015 toys-to-life video game Lego Dimensions, Cash posthumously reprised his role as the "Space Coyote" in the exclusive level for Homer, "The Mysterious Voyage of Homer" (a remake of the episode) via archival audio recordings from the original episode.

Cash was joined by guitarist Kim Thayil of Soundgarden, bassist Krist Novoselic of Nirvana, and drummer Sean Kinney of Alice in Chains for a cover of Willie Nelson's "Time of the Preacher", featured on the tribute album Twisted Willie, released in January 1996.

In 1996, Cash collaborated with Tom Petty and the Heartbreakers on Unchained (also known as American Recordings II), which won the Best Country Album Grammy in 1998. The album was produced by Rick Rubin with Sylvia Massy engineering and mixing. A majority of Unchained was recorded at Sound City Studios and featured guest appearances by Lindsey Buckingham, Mick Fleetwood, and Marty Stuart. Believing he did not explain enough of himself in his 1975 autobiography Man in Black, he wrote Cash: The Autobiography in 1997.

== Personal life ==
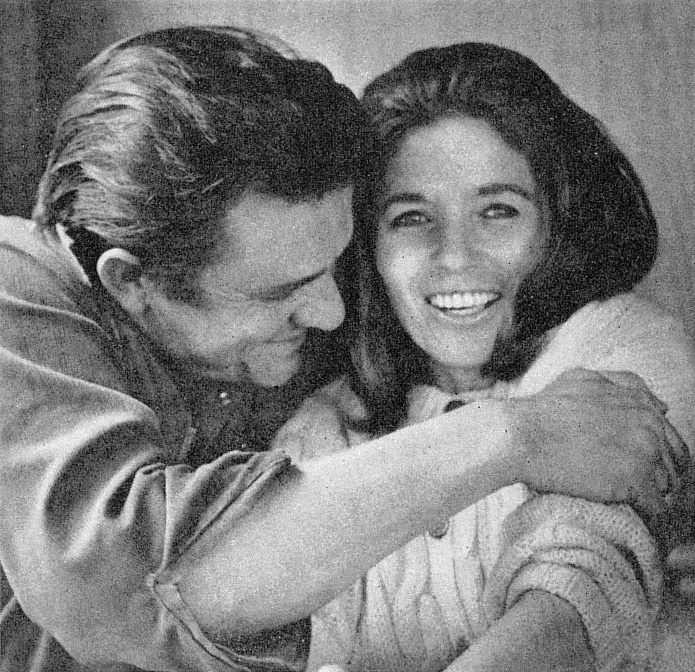
Cash and his second wife, June Carter in 1969

On July 18, 1951, while in Air Force basic training, Cash met 17-year-old Italian-American Vivian Liberto at a roller skating rink in San Antonio, Texas. They dated for three weeks before Cash was deployed to West Germany for a three-year tour. During that time, the couple exchanged hundreds of love letters. On August 7, 1954, one month after his discharge, they were married at St. Ann's Roman Catholic Church in San Antonio. They had four daughters: Rosanne, Kathy, Cindy, and Tara. In 1961, Cash moved his family to a hilltop home overlooking Casitas Springs, California. He had previously relocated his parents to the area to run a small trailer park called the Johnny Cash Trailer Park. His drinking led to several run-ins with local law enforcement. Liberto later said she filed for divorce in 1966 because of Cash's severe abuse of alcohol and other drugs, his constant touring, his repeated acts of adultery with other women, and his close relationship with singer June Carter. Their four daughters were then raised by their mother.

Cash met June of the famed Carter Family while on tour, and the two became infatuated with each other. In 1968, 13 years after they first met backstage at the Grand Ole Opry, Cash proposed to June, during a live performance in London, Ontario. The couple married on March 1, 1968, in Franklin, Kentucky. They had one child together, John Carter Cash, born March 3, 1970. He was the only son for both Johnny and June. In addition to his four daughters and John Carter, Cash also became stepfather to June's daughters, Carlene and Rosie. Throughout their marriage, June attempted to keep Cash off amphetamines, often taking his drugs and flushing them down the toilet. June remained with him even throughout his multiple admissions for rehabilitation treatment and decades of drug addiction.

=== Religious beliefs ===
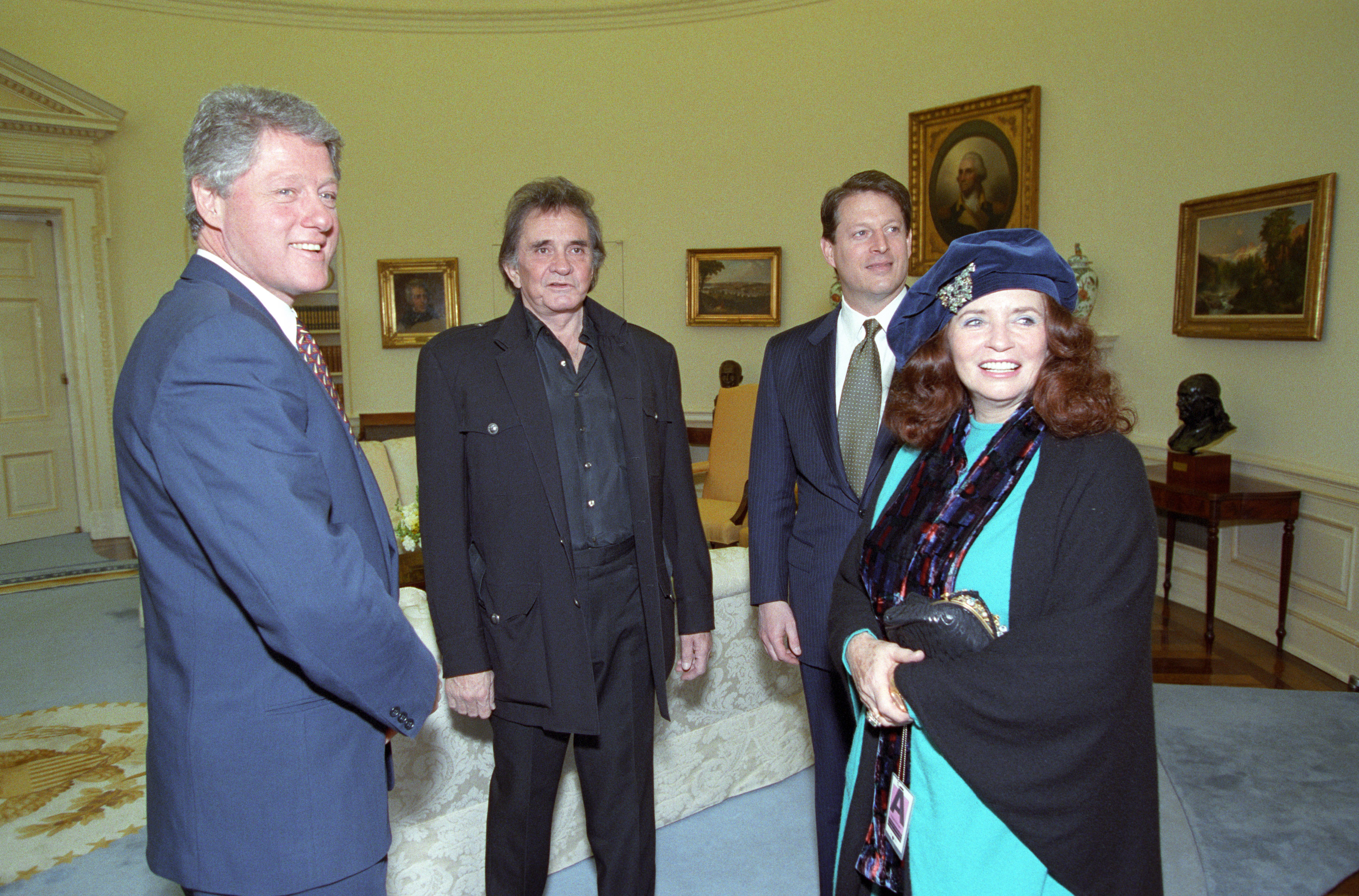
Cash and June Carter Cash with Bill Clinton and Al Gore, April 1993

Cash was raised by his parents in the Christian faith. In 1944, he became a Christian at the Central Baptist Church in Dyess, Arkansas, affiliated to the Southern Baptist Convention, and began singing publicly there. He was baptized shortly after in the Tyronza River.

A troubled but devout Christian, Cash has been characterized as a "lens through which to view American contradictions and challenges." (Note: Other appraisals of Cash's iconic value have been even bolder.) On May 9, 1971, he answered the altar call at Evangel Temple in Nashville, an Assemblies of God congregation pastored by Jimmie R. Snow, with outreach to people in the music world.

Cash penned a Christian novel, Man in White, in 1986, and in the introduction writes about a reporter who, interested in Cash's religious beliefs, questioned whether the book is written from a Baptist, Catholic, or Jewish perspective. Cash replied, "I'm a Christian. Don't put me in another box."

In the mid-1970s, Cash and his wife, June, completed a course of study in the Bible through Christian International Bible College, culminating in a pilgrimage to Israel in November 1978. Around that time, he was ordained as a minister, and officiated at his daughter's wedding. He often performed at Billy Graham Crusades. At a Tallahassee Crusade in 1986, June and Johnny sang his song "One of These Days I'm Gonna Sit Down and Talk to Paul". At a performance in Arkansas in 1989, Johnny Cash spoke to attendees of his commitment to the salvation of drug dealers and alcoholics. He then sang "Family Bible".

He recorded several gospel albums and made a spoken-word recording of the entire New King James Version of the New Testament. Cash declared he was "the biggest sinner of them all", and viewed himself overall as a complicated and contradictory man. (Note: Urbanski notes that Cash's habit of performing in black attire began in a church. In the following paragraph, he quotes Cash as indicating that this habit was partially reflective of Cash's rebellion "against our hypocritical houses of God.) Accordingly, (Note: According to Urbanski, Cash's self-perception was accurate: "He never intended to be categorized or pigeonholed", and indeed he amassed a "cluster of enigmas" which "was so impenetrably deep that even those closest to him never got to see every part of him".) Cash is said to have "contained multitudes", and has been deemed "the philosopher-prince of American country music."

Cash is credited with having converted actor and singer John Schneider to Christianity.

== Later years and death ==
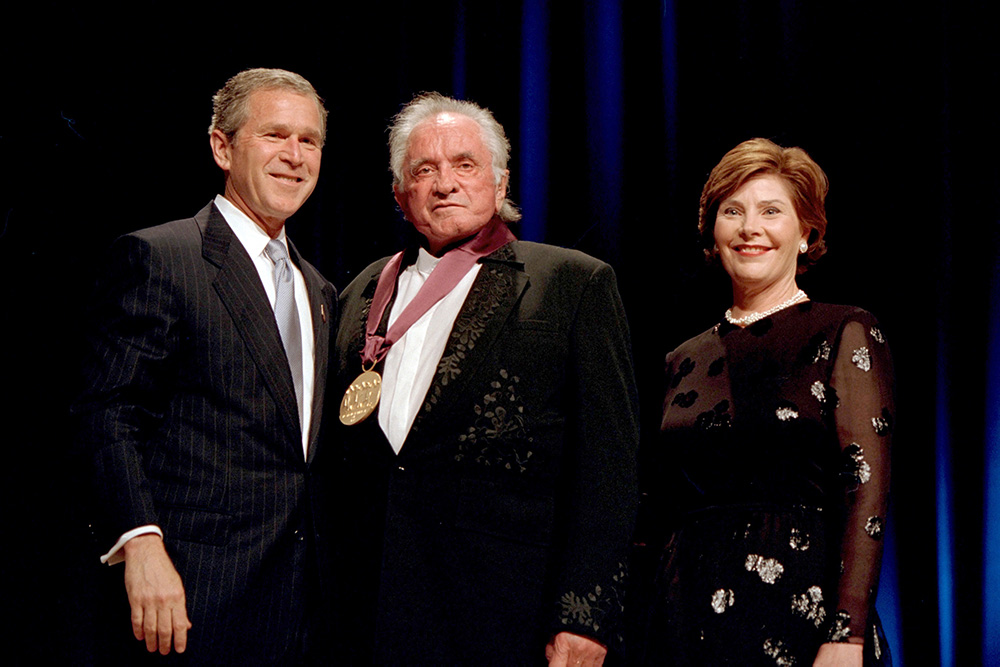
Cash with President George W. Bush and First Lady Laura Bush at Constitution Hall in Washington, D.C. in 2002

In 1997, during a trip to New York City, Cash was diagnosed with the neurodegenerative disease Shy–Drager syndrome, a form of multiple system atrophy. According to biographer Robert Hilburn, the disease was initially misdiagnosed as Parkinson's disease, and Cash even announced to his audience that he had Parkinson's after nearly collapsing on stage in Flint, Michigan, on October 25, 1997. Soon afterward, his diagnosis was revised to Shy–Drager, and Cash was told he had about 18 months to live. The diagnosis was later altered again to autonomic neuropathy associated with diabetes. His illness forced him to curtail touring, and he was hospitalized in 1998 with severe pneumonia, which damaged his lungs.

During the final stage of his career, Cash released the albums American III: Solitary Man (2000) and American IV: The Man Comes Around (2002). American IV included cover songs by several late 20th-century rock artists, notably "Hurt" by Nine Inch Nails and "Personal Jesus" by Depeche Mode. Trent Reznor of Nine Inch Nails commented that he was initially skeptical about Cash's plan to cover "Hurt", but was later impressed and moved by the rendition. The video for "Hurt" received both critical and popular acclaim, including a Grammy Award.

June died on May 15, 2003, at age 73, following complications from heart surgery. She had urged Cash to keep working, and he continued to record, completing 60 songs in the last four months of his life. He also performed surprise shows at the Carter Family Fold outside Bristol, Virginia. After June's death, Cash believed that his only reason for living was his music. At the July 5, 2003, concert—his final public performance—before singing "Ring of Fire," Cash read a statement he had written shortly before taking the stage:

The spirit of June Carter overshadows me tonight with the love she had for me and the love I have for her. We connect somewhere between here and Heaven. She came down for a short visit, I guess, from Heaven to visit with me tonight to give me courage and inspiration like she always has. She's never been one for me except courage and inspiration. I thank God for June Carter. I love her with all my heart.

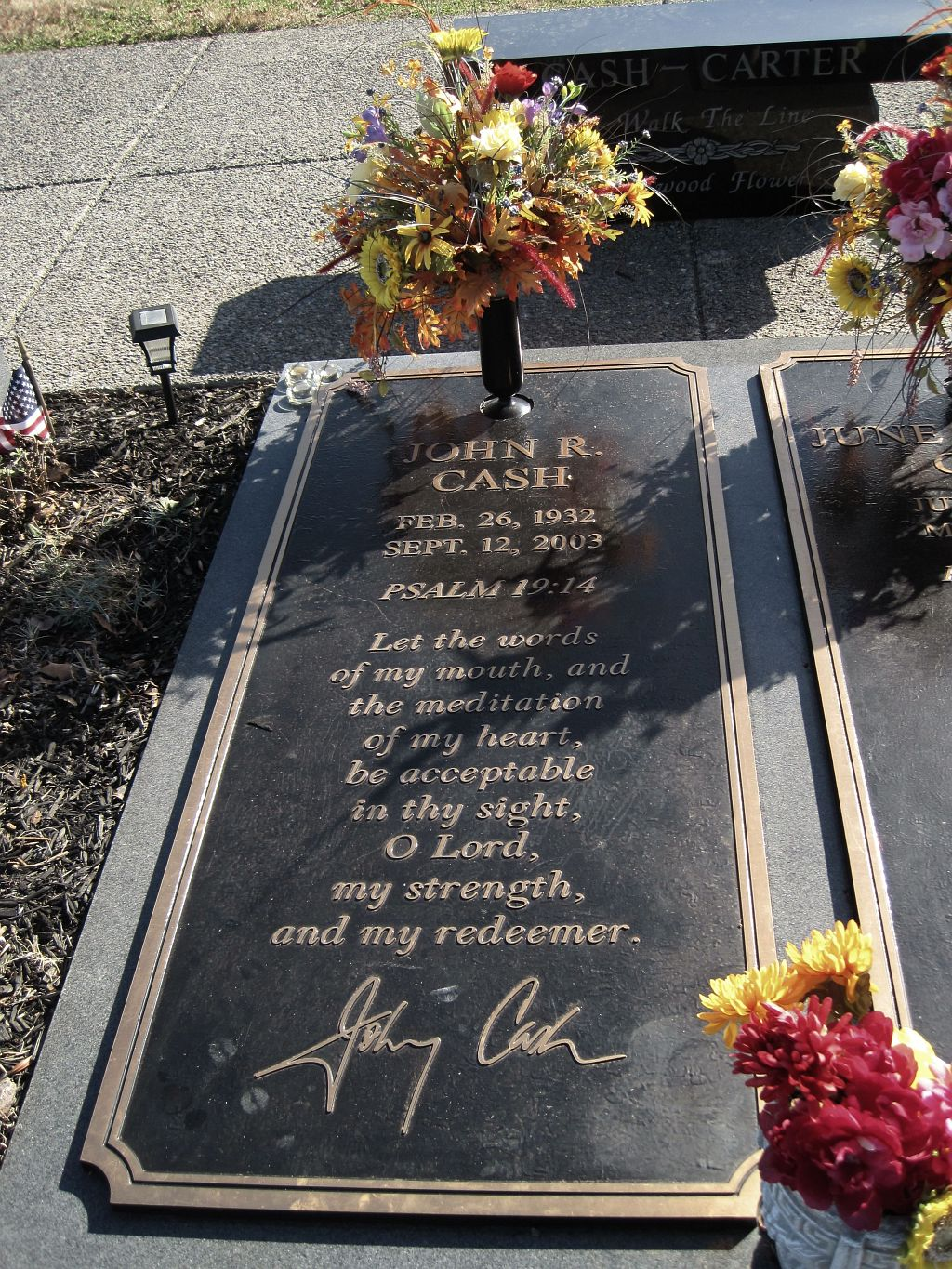
Cash's grave at Hendersonville Memory Gardens in Hendersonville, Tennessee

Cash continued recording until shortly before his death. "When June died, it tore him up", Rick Rubin recalled. "He said to me, 'You have to keep me working because I will die if I don't have something to do.' He was in a wheelchair by then and we set him up at his home in Virginia... I couldn't listen to those recordings for two years after he died and it was heartbreaking when he died." Cash's final recordings were made on August 21, 2003, and included "Like the 309", released on American V: A Hundred Highways in 2006, and the last song he completed, "Engine 143", recorded for his son John Carter Cash's planned Carter Family tribute album.

On September 12, 2003, at approximately 2 a.m. Central Time, Cash died of complications from diabetes at Baptist Hospital in Nashville, Tennessee, at age 71. His death occurred less than four months after his wife's. President Bush issued a statement calling him a "music legend and American icon". Public funeral services were held at the First Baptist Church in Hendersonville, Tennessee, and were attended by notable figures Kris Kristofferson, Willie Nelson, Franklin Graham, Hank Williams Jr., George Jones, and former Vice President Al Gore who said Cash had recently told him the death of his wife was "the hardest pain I have ever felt." Gore said "he was ready". Cash was buried beside his wife at Hendersonville Memory Gardens.

In a tribute in Rolling Stone, Bob Dylan called Cash "the North Star; you could guide your ship by him –– the greatest of the greats then and now." Merle Haggard remembered the first time he saw Johnny play as an inmate in San Quentin Prison: "the day after Johnny's show... every guitar player in San Quentin was after me to teach them how to play like him." Kris Kristofferson called him "my hero". Bono said "we're all sissies in comparison to Johnny Cash". Sheryl Crow declared he "spoke for every man". Tom Petty recalled that he "was friends with presidents, and he was friends with people at the bus stop."

== Legacy ==
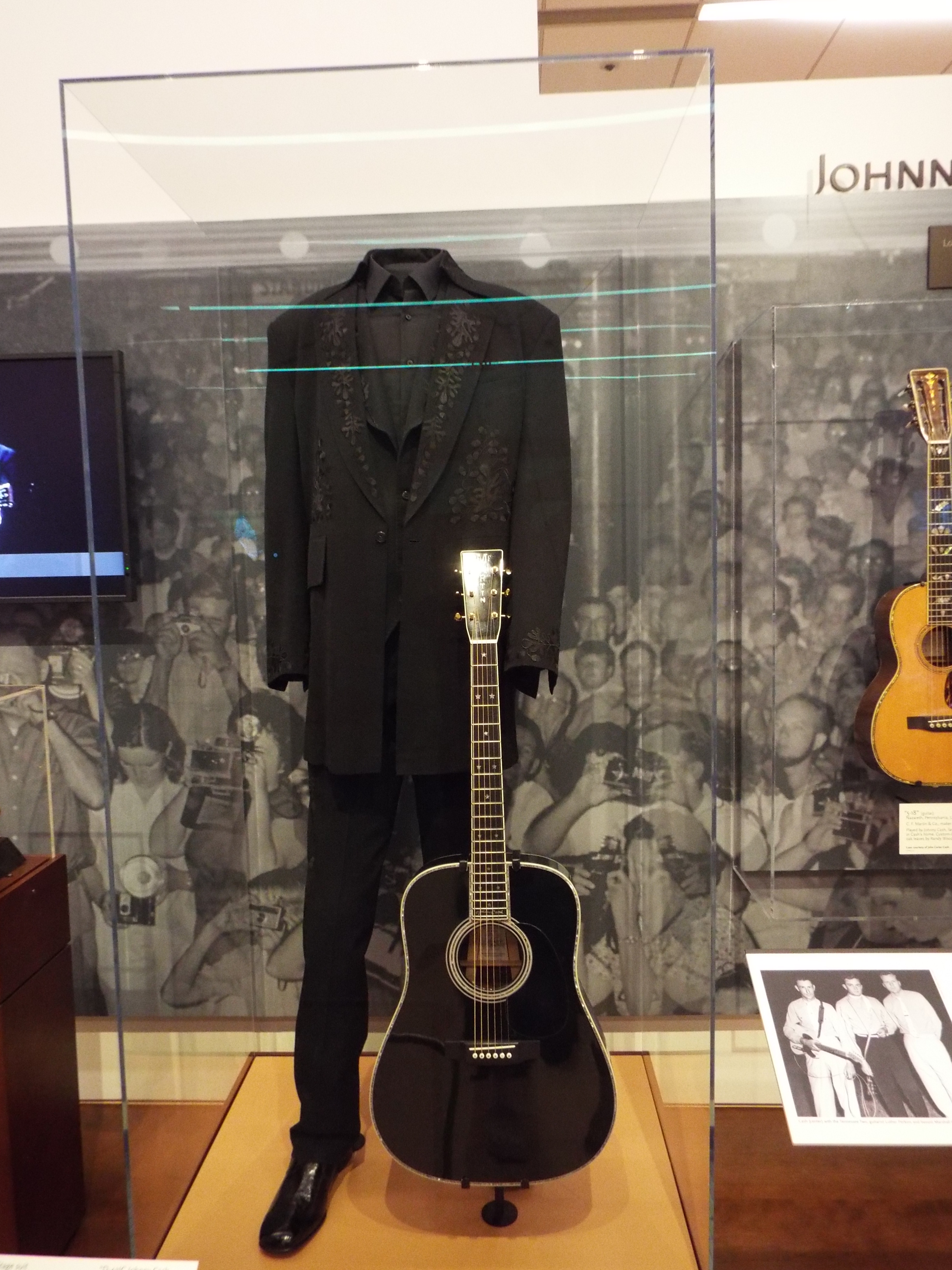
Cash's clothes and guitar on display at Artist Gallery of the Musical Instrument Museum of Phoenix in Phoenix, Arizona

Statue of Cash in the United States Capitol, unveiled in 2024

Cash nurtured and defended artists such as Bob Dylan on the fringes of what was acceptable in country music even while serving as the country music establishment's most visible symbol. At an all-star concert which aired in 1999 on TNT, a diverse group of artists paid him tribute, including Dylan, Chris Isaak, Wyclef Jean, Sheryl Crow, Kris Kristofferson, Willie Nelson, Dom DeLuise, and U2. Cash himself appeared at the end and performed for the first time in more than a year. Two tribute albums were released shortly before his death; Kindred Spirits contains works from established artists, while Dressed in Black contains works from many lesser-known musicians. Cash served as a major influence on Dylan's desire to transition to an electric guitar, which was notably shown during his performance at the 1965 Newport Folk Festival, and use of less traditional protest themed folk music. In addition to his use of an electric guitar at the 1964 Newport Folk Festival, a letter which Cash wrote to the editor of Broadside which called for the people at the festival to "shut up and let me sing" shortly before the 1964 festival had major influence on Dylan's shift in the direction for his musical career as well.

In total, he wrote over 1,000 songs and released dozens of albums. A box set titled Unearthed was issued posthumously. It included four CDs of unreleased material recorded with Rubin, as well as a Best of Cash on American retrospective CD. The set also includes a 104-page book that discusses each track and features one of Cash's final interviews.

In 1999, Cash received the Grammy Lifetime Achievement Award. In 2004, Rolling Stone ranked Cash number 31 on their "100 Greatest Artists of All Time" list and No. 21 on their "100 Greatest Singers" list in 2010. In 2012, Rolling Stone ranked Cash's 1968 live album At Folsom Prison and 1994 studio album American Recordings at No. 88 and No. 366 in its list of the 500 greatest albums of all time.

Cash had a personal link with SOS Children's Villages in Dießen, at the Ammersee Lake in Bavaria, near where he was stationed as a GI, and with the SOS village in Barrett Town, by Montego Bay, near his holiday home in Jamaica.

In January 2006, Cash's lakeside home on Caudill Drive in Hendersonville was sold to Bee Gees vocalist Barry Gibb and wife Linda for $2.3 million. On April 10, 2007, during major renovation works carried out for Gibb, a fire broke out at the house, spreading quickly due to a flammable wood preservative that had been used. The building was completely destroyed.

One of Cash's final collaborations with producer Rick Rubin, American V: A Hundred Highways, was released posthumously on July 4, 2006. The album debuted at number one on the Billboard Top 200 album chart for the week ending July 22, 2006. On February 23, 2010, three days before what would have been Cash's 78th birthday, the Cash Family, Rick Rubin, and Lost Highway Records released his second posthumous record, titled American VI: Ain't No Grave.

The main street in Hendersonville, Tennessee, Highway 31E, is known as "Johnny Cash Parkway". The Johnny Cash Museum, located in one of Cash's properties in Hendersonville until 2006, dubbed the House of Cash, was sold based on Cash's will. Before this, having been closed for a number of years, the museum had been featured in Cash's music video for "Hurt". The house subsequently burned down during the renovation by the new owner. A new museum, founded by Shannon and Bill Miller, opened April 26, 2013, in downtown Nashville.

On November 2–4, 2007, the Johnny Cash Flower Pickin' Festival was held in Starkville, Mississippi, where Cash had been arrested more than 40 years earlier and held overnight at the city jail on May 11, 1965. The incident inspired Cash to write the song "Starkville City Jail". The festival, where he was offered a symbolic posthumous pardon, honored Cash's life and music, and was expected to become an annual event.

JC Unit One, Johnny Cash's private tour bus from 1980 until 2003, was put on exhibit at the Rock and Roll Hall of Fame and Museum in Cleveland, Ohio, in 2007. The museum offers public tours of the bus on a seasonal basis (it is stored during the winter and not exhibited during those times).

A limited-edition Forever stamp honoring Cash went on sale June 5, 2013. The stamp features a promotional picture of Cash taken around the 1963 release of Ring of Fire: The Best of Johnny Cash.

In October 2014, the City of Folsom unveiled phase 1 of the Johnny Cash Trail to the public with a dedication and ribbon-cutting ceremony attended by Rosanne Cash. Along the trail, 8 art pieces tell his connection to Folsom Prison, and his epic musical career. The Johnny Cash Trail features art selected by a committee that included Cindy Cash, a 2-acre (0.81 ha) Legacy Park, and over 3 miles (4.8 km) of multi-use class-I bike trail.

In 2015, a new species of black tarantula was identified near Folsom Prison and named Aphonopelma johnnycashi in his honor.

In 2016, the Nashville Sounds Minor League Baseball team added the "Country Legends Race" to its between-innings entertainment. At the middle of the fifth inning, people in oversized foam caricature costumes depicting Cash, as well as George Jones, Reba McEntire, and Dolly Parton, race around the warning track at First Horizon Park from center field to the home plate side of the first base dugout.

On February 8, 2018, the album Forever Words was announced, putting music to poems that Cash had written and which were published in book form in 2016.

Johnny Cash's boyhood home in Dyess was listed in the National Register of Historic Places on May 2, 2018, as "Farm No. 266, Johnny Cash Boyhood Home."

The Arkansas Country Music Awards honored Johnny Cash's legacy with the Lifetime Achievement award on June 3, 2018. The ceremony was held that same date, which was a Monday night at the University of Arkansas at Little Rock in Little Rock, Arkansas. The nominations took place in early 2018.

In 2019, Sheryl Crow released a duet with Cash on her song "Redemption Day" for her album Threads. Crow, who had originally written and recorded the song in 1996, recorded new vocals and added them to those of Cash, who recorded the song for his American VI: Ain't No Grave album.

In April 2019, it was announced that the state of Arkansas would place a statue of Cash in the National Statuary Hall in an effort to represent the modern history of Arkansas. The Governor of Arkansas, Asa Hutchinson, stated that Cash's contributions to music made him an appropriate figure to tell the story of the state.

In April 2024, unfinished and unreleased demos recorded by Cash were announced to be released in a new compilation album, Songwriter. The album – co-produced by Cash's son, John Carter Cash – contains eleven songs, recorded in 1993 with guest artists including Vince Gill and the Black Keys. Songwriter's release date was announced as June 28, 2024.

=== Portrayals ===
Country singer Mark Collie portrayed Cash in John Lloyd Miller's award-winning 1999 short film I Still Miss Someone.

In November 2005, Walk the Line, a biographical film about Cash's life, was released in the United States to considerable commercial success and critical acclaim. The film featured Joaquin Phoenix as Johnny (for which he was nominated for the Academy Award for Best Actor) and Reese Witherspoon as June (for which she won the Academy Award for Best Actress). Phoenix and Witherspoon also won the Golden Globe for Best Actor in a Musical or Comedy and Best Actress in a Musical or Comedy, respectively. They both performed their own vocals in the film (with their version of "Jackson" being released as a single), and Phoenix learned to play guitar for the role. Phoenix received a Grammy Award for his contributions to the soundtrack. John Carter Cash, the son of Johnny and June, served as an executive producer.

On March 12, 2006, Ring of Fire, a jukebox musical of the Cash oeuvre, debuted on Broadway at the Ethel Barrymore Theater, but closed due to harsh reviews and disappointing sales on April 30. Million Dollar Quartet, a musical portraying the early Sun recording sessions involving Cash, Elvis Presley, Jerry Lee Lewis, and Carl Perkins, debuted on Broadway on April 11, 2010. Actor Lance Guest portrayed Cash. The musical was nominated for three awards at the 2010 Tony Awards and won one.

In the 2024 film A Complete Unknown, about the early career of Bob Dylan, Cash is portrayed by actor Boyd Holbrook.

== Awards and honors ==
If there were a hall of fame for creating larger-than-life personae, Cash would no doubt have been elected to it as well. His 1971 song "Man in Black" codified an image that the singer had assumed naturally for more than fifteen years at that point. Part rural preacher, part outlaw Robin Hood, he was a blue-collar prophet who, dressed in stark contrast to the glinting rhinestones and shimmering psychedelia of the time, spoke truth to power.

— Johnny Cash: Remembering the Incomparable Legend of Country, Rock and Roll, Rolling Stone

Cash received multiple Country Music Association Awards, Grammys, and other awards, in categories ranging from vocal and spoken performances to album notes and videos. In a career that spanned almost five decades, Cash was the personification of country music to many people around the world. Cash was a musician who was not defined by a single genre. He recorded songs that could be considered rock and roll, blues, rockabilly, folk, and gospel, and exerted an influence on each of those genres.

Cash was inducted into the Rockabilly Hall of Fame in 1999. He was also inducted into the Nashville Songwriters Hall of Fame (1977), the Country Music Hall of Fame (1980), the Rock and Roll Hall of Fame (1992), GMA's Gospel Music Hall of Fame (2010), and the Memphis Music Hall of Fame (2013). Cash stated that his induction into the Country Music Hall of Fame in 1980 was his greatest professional achievement.

Other than Elvis Presley, Cash was the only artist inducted as a performer into both the Country Music Hall of Fame and the Rock and Roll Hall of Fame.

In 2001, he was awarded the National Medal of Arts.

The music video for "Hurt" was nominated for six VMAs at the 2003 MTV Video Music Awards, winning only one: Best Cinematography. Cash became the oldest artist ever nominated for an MTV Video Music Award. Justin Timberlake, who won Best Video that year for "Cry Me a River", said in his acceptance speech: "This is a travesty! I demand a recount. My grandfather raised me on Johnny Cash, and I think he deserves this more than any of us in here tonight."

== Discography ==
- Johnny Cash with His Hot and Blue Guitar! (1957)
- The Fabulous Johnny Cash (1958)
- Hymns by Johnny Cash (1959)
- Songs of Our Soil (1959)
- Now, There Was a Song! (1960)
- Ride This Train (1960)
- Hymns from the Heart (1962)
- The Sound of Johnny Cash (1962)
- Blood, Sweat and Tears (1963)
- The Christmas Spirit (1963)
- Keep on the Sunny Side (with the Carter Family) (1964)
- I Walk the Line (1964)
- Bitter Tears: Ballads of the American Indian (1964)
- Orange Blossom Special (1965)
- Johnny Cash Sings the Ballads of the True West (1965)
- Everybody Loves a Nut (1966)
- Happiness Is You (1966)
- Carryin' On with Johnny Cash & June Carter (with June Carter) (1967)
- From Sea to Shining Sea (1968)
- The Holy Land (1969)
- Hello, I'm Johnny Cash (1970)
- Man in Black (1971)
- A Thing Called Love (1972)
- America: A 200-Year Salute in Story and Song (1972)
- The Johnny Cash Family Christmas (1972)
- Any Old Wind That Blows (1973)
- Johnny Cash and His Woman (with June Carter Cash) (1973)
- Ragged Old Flag (1974)
- The Junkie and the Juicehead Minus Me (1974)
- The Johnny Cash Children's Album (1975)
- Johnny Cash Sings Precious Memories (1975)
- John R. Cash (1975)
- Look at Them Beans (1975)
- One Piece at a Time (1976)
- The Last Gunfighter Ballad (1977)
- The Rambler (1977)
- I Would Like to See You Again (1978)
- Gone Girl (1978)
- Silver (1979)
- A Believer Sings the Truth (1979)
- Johnny Cash Sings with the BC Goodpasture Christian School (1979)
- Rockabilly Blues (1980)
- Classic Christmas (1980)
- The Baron (1981)
- The Adventures of Johnny Cash (1982)
- Johnny 99 (1983)
- Highwayman (with Waylon Jennings, Willie Nelson & Kris Kristofferson) (1985)
- Rainbow (1985)
- Heroes (with Waylon Jennings) (1986)
- Class of '55 (with Roy Orbison, Jerry Lee Lewis & Carl Perkins) (1986)
- Believe in Him (1986)
- Johnny Cash Is Coming to Town (1987)
- Classic Cash: Hall of Fame Series (1988)
- Water from the Wells of Home (1988)
- Boom Chicka Boom (1990)
- Highwayman 2 (with Waylon Jennings, Willie Nelson & Kris Kristofferson) (1990)
- The Mystery of Life (1991)
- Country Christmas (1991)
- American Recordings (1994)
- The Road Goes on Forever (with Waylon Jennings, Willie Nelson & Kris Kristofferson) (1995)
- American II: Unchained (1996)
- American III: Solitary Man (2000)
- American IV: The Man Comes Around (2002)
- My Mother's Hymn Book (2004)
- American V: A Hundred Highways (2006)
- American VI: Ain't No Grave (2010)
- Out Among the Stars (2014)
- Songwriter (2024)

== Filmography ==
=== Film ===
Year	Title	Role	Notes
1961	Five Minutes to Live	Johnny Cabot	Also titled Door-to-Door Maniac
1967	The Road to Nashville	Himself	Country music jukebox musical
1970	Johnny Cash! The Man, His World, His Music	Himself	Documentary had theatrical debut after TV broadcast
1971	A Gunfight	Abe Cross	
1973	Gospel Road: A Story of Jesus	Narrator/Himself	Also co-writer
1983	Kairei	Uncle John	Japanese film about Otokichi
1983	Murder in Coweta County	Sheriff Lamar Potts	
1994	Gene Autry, Melody of the West	Narrator	Documentary film; voice acting role
2003	The Hunted	Narrator	Voice acting role
2008	Johnny Cash at Folsom Prison	Himself	Documentary film; archive footage
2008	Johnny Cash's America	Himself	Documentary film; archive footage
2012	My Father and the Man in Black	Himself	Documentary film; archive footage
2014	The Winding Stream	Himself	Documentary film; archive footage
2014	Johnny Cash: American Rebel a/k/a I Am Johnny Cash	Himself	Documentary film; archive footage
2015	We're Still Here: Johnny Cash's Bitter Tears Revisited	Himself	Documentary film; archive footage
2019	The Gift: The Journey of Johnny Cash	Himself	Documentary film; archive footage
2020	My Darling Vivian	Himself	Documentary film; archive footage
2022	Johnny Cash: The Redemption of an American Icon	Himself	Documentary film; archive footage

=== Television ===
Year	Title	Role	Notes
1958–1959	Town Hall Party	Himself	2 episodes, live concert specials
1959	Shotgun Slade	Sheriff	Episode: "The Stalkers"
1959	Wagon Train	Frank Hoag	Episode: "The C.L. Harding Story
1960	The Rebel	Pratt	Episode: "The Death of Gray"
1961	The Deputy	Bo Braddock	Episode: "The Deathly Quiet"
1966	Rainbow Quest	Himself	Musical special with June Carter Cash, hosted by Pete Seeger
1969	Johnny Cash! The Man, His World, His Music	Himself	Television film; BBC bio documentary by Robert Elfstrom
1969	Johnny Cash at San Quentin	Himself	Concert film special; directed by Michael Darlow
1969–1971	The Johnny Cash Show	Himself – host and performer	58 episodes
1970	NET Playhouse	John Ross	Episode: "Trail of Tears"
1970	The Partridge Family	Variety Show Host	Episode: "What? Get Out of Show Business?"
1971	Johnny Cash i København	Himself	Live concert special filmed in Denmark
1973–1992	Sesame Street	Himself	4 episodes
1974–1988	Hee Haw	Himself	4 episodes
1974	Columbo	Tommy Brown	Episode: "Swan Song"
1974	Johnny Cash Ridin' the Rails—The Great American Train Story	Himself	Musical special
1976	Johnny Cash and Friends	Himself	4 episodes
1976	Little House on the Prairie	Caleb Hodgekiss	Episode: "The Collection"
1976–1985	Johnny Cash specials (various titles)	Himself	15 specials
1977	A Concert Behind Prison Walls	Himself	Live special
1978	Thaddeus Rose and Eddie	Thaddeus Rose	Television film
1978	Steve Martin: A Wild and Crazy Guy	Himself	Television special
1980	The Muppet Show	Himself	Episode: "#5.21"
1980	Johnny Cash: The First 25 Years	Himself	Live concert special
1981	Johnny Cash: Live in London	Himself	Live concert special
1981	The Pride of Jesse Hallam	Jesse Hallam	Television film
1982	Saturday Night Live	Himself	Episode: "Johnny Cash/Elton John"
1982	Johnny Cash's America: Live at the Kennedy Center Washington, DC	Himself	Live HBO concert special
1983	Murder in Coweta County	Lamarr Potts	Television film; also producer
1984	The Baron and the Kid	The Baron; Will	Television film
1985	North and South	John Brown	6 episodes
1986	The Last Days of Frank and Jesse James	Frank James	Television film
1986	Stagecoach	Curly Wilcox	Television film
1987	Austin City Limits	Himself	Live concert special
1988	The Magical World of Disney	Elder Davy Crockett	Episode: "Rainbow in the Thunder"
1993–1997	Dr. Quinn, Medicine Woman	Kid Cole	4 episodes
1996	Renegade	Henry Travis	Episode: "The Road Not Taken"
1997	The Simpsons	Space Coyote	Episode: "El Viaje Misterioso de Nuestro Jomer (The Mysterious Voyage of Homer)"; voice acting role
1997	VH1 Storytellers	Himself	Live concert special, episode: Johnny Cash & Willie Nelson
1998	Johnny Cash: All My Friends Are Cowboys	Himself	Television special
1998	Biography	Himself	Documentary special, episode: Johnny Cash: The Man in Black
2004	Johnny Cash: The Last Great American	Himself	BBC documentary special
2006	CMT presents American Revolutions	Himself	Documentary special, episode: The Highwaymen
2012	Song By Song	Himself	Documentary special, episode: Johnny Cash - Ring of Fire
2016	American Masters	Himself	PBS documentary special, episode: The Highwaymen: Friends Till the End
2020	Johnny Cash & Me	Himself	PBS documentary special
2020	Johnny Cash: The Man in Black in Britain	Himself	Channel 5 documentary special
2021	Johnny Cash: Road to Redemption	Himself	Reelz documentary special
2021	Johnny Cash: The Man in Black	Himself	Reelz documentary special

=== Video games ===
Year	Title	Role	Notes
2015	Lego Dimensions	Space Coyote	Archival recordings

== Published works ==
- Man in Black: His Own Story in His Own Words, Zondervan, 1975; ISBN 99924-31-58-X
- Man in White, a novel about the Apostle Paul, HarperCollins, 1986; ISBN 0-06-250132-1
- Cash: The Autobiography, with Patrick Carr, HarperCollins, 1997; ISBN 978-0-06-101357-7
- Johnny Cash Reads the New Testament, Thomas Nelson, 2011; ISBN 978-1-4185-4883-4
- Recollections by Johnny Cash, edited by daughter Tara, 2014; ISBN 978-0-930677-03-9
- The Man Who Carried Cash: Saul Holiff, Johnny Cash, and the Making of an American Icon by Julie Chadwick, Dundurn Press, 2017; ISBN 978-1-459737-23-5
- Cash, Johnny; Mark Stielper; John Carter Cash (November 14, 2023). Johnny Cash: The Life in Lyrics. New York: Voracious; Little, Brown and Company. ISBN 9780316503105. OCLC 1407575187.

== Notes ==
Awards
First None recognized before	First Amendment Center/AMA "Spirit of Americana" Free Speech Award; 2002	Succeeded by Kris Kristofferson
Preceded by Buddy & Julie Miller	AMA Album of the Year (artist); 2003	Succeeded by Loretta Lynn
Preceded by Jim Lauderdale	AMA Artist of the Year; 2003	Succeeded by Loretta Lynn
