= Hendersonville Memory Gardens =

Cemetery in Hendersonville, Tennessee, United States

Coordinates: 36°18′42″N 86°35′31″W

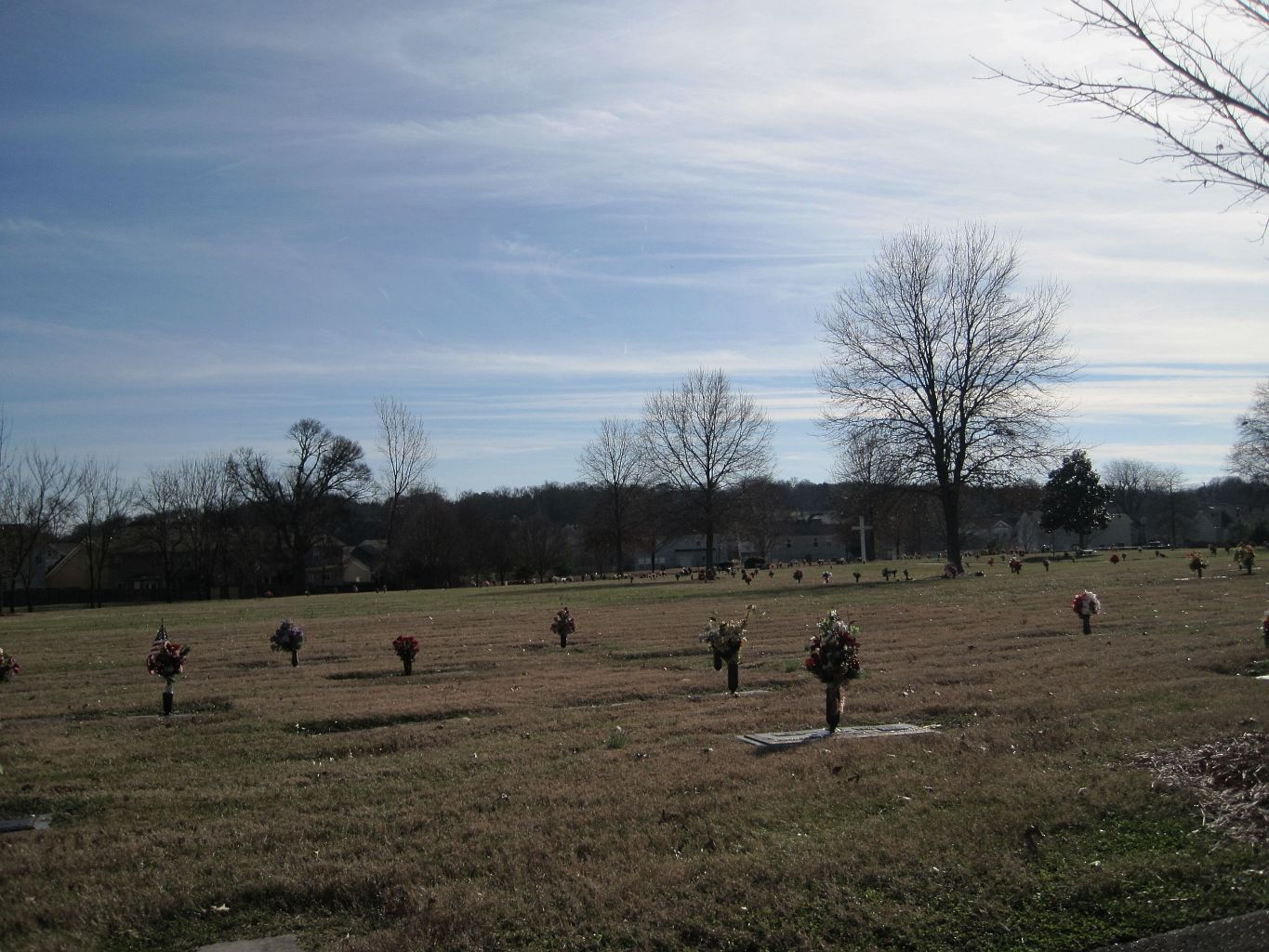
- Interactive map of Hendersonville Memory Gardens

Details
- Location: 353 East Main Street, Hendersonville, Tennessee

Hendersonville Memory Gardens is a cemetery located at 353 East Main Street in Hendersonville, Tennessee, United States, a few miles northeast of Nashville. Formerly known as Woodlawn Memorial Park East, it is the burial site of Johnny Cash as well as several members of the Carter Family of musicians, and numerous other stars from the world of country music.

== Notable interments ==
- Mae Boren Axton
- Max D. Barnes (1936–2004), songwriter
- "Mother" Maybelle Carter (1909–1978), musician, singer, songwriter, member of the Original Carter Family
- Helen Carter (1927–1998), country singer-musician and eldest daughter of Maybelle Carter
- Anita Carter (1933–1999), singer-musician and daughter of Maybelle Carter
- Johnny Cash (1932–2003), country music singer-songwriter
- June Carter Cash (1929–2003), country music singer
- Rosie Nix Adams (1958–2003), singer-songwriter and daughter of June Carter Cash
- Ferlin Husky (1925–2011), country music singer
- Merle Kilgore (1934–2005), country music singer-songwriter
- Joe Maphis (1921–1986), country music master guitarist
- Luther Perkins (1928–1968), country music guitarist for Johnny Cash
- Johnny Russell, country music star
- Jean Shepard, Country music star
- Charlie Walker, country music star
- Sheb Wooley (1921–2003), actor and singer-songwriter

== See also ==
- List of United States cemeteries
