= Thomas Gabriel (country singer) =

American singer-songwriter

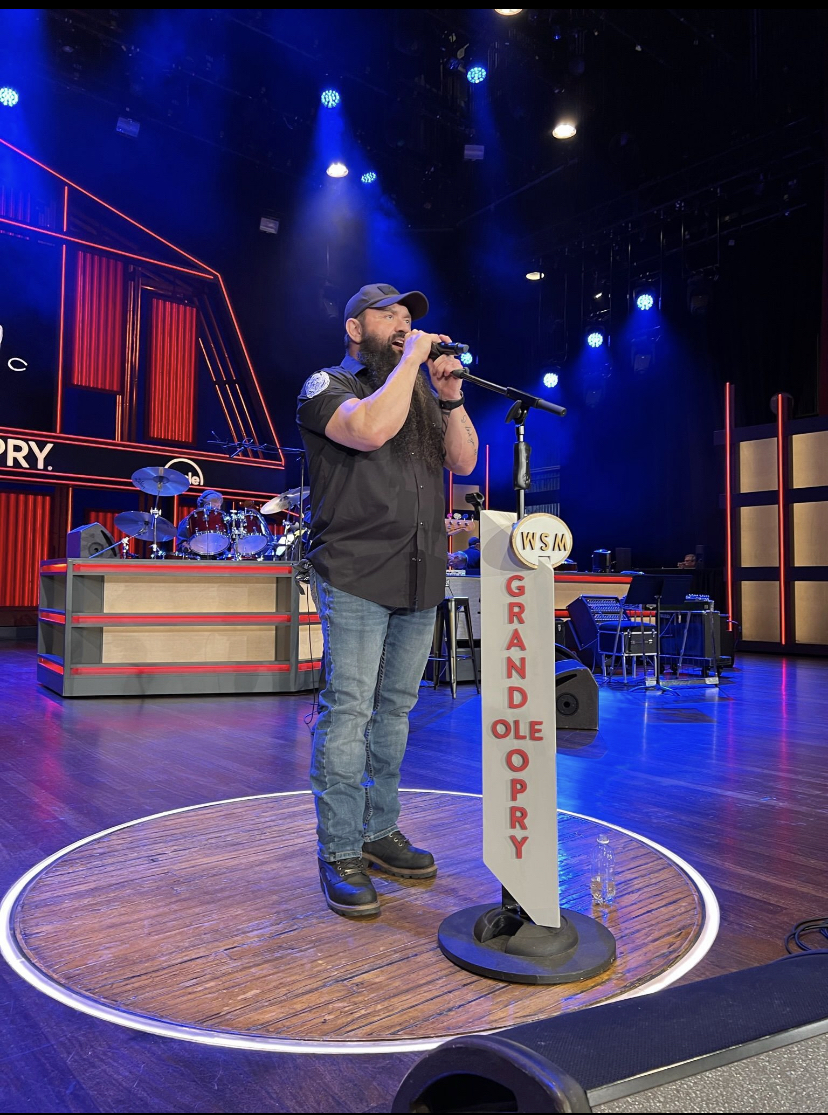
- Gabriel in 2023

Background information
- Born: 1973 (age 52–53); Ventura, California, U.S.
- Genres: Americana
- Occupations: Singer; songwriter
- Website: www.thomasgabriel.com
- Relatives: Johnny Cash (grandfather); Vivian Liberto Cash (grandmother); Rosanne Cash (aunt); John Carter Cash (uncle)

Thomas Gabriel is an American singer and songwriter, whose music has been described as a mix of Americana/Roots with a hint of country and rock. He is the eldest grandchild of singer and actor Johnny Cash.

== Biography ==
Thomas Gabriel was born in 1973 in Ventura, California, to Kathy Cash and Thomas Coggins. Kathy Cash is the second of four daughters Johnny Cash had with his first wife Vivian (Liberto) Cash. Kathy was 16 years old when Thomas was born.

As a child, Gabriel spent time touring with grandparents Johnny Cash and June Carter Cash (Johnny's second wife). He became interested in music at an early age, taking up guitar at age 11. Gabriel followed his grandparents in music, but also quickly started experimenting with alcohol, starting drinking at age 13. He struggled with substance abuse, as had the Cash and Carter families.

Despite Gabriel's interest in music, Johnny Cash steered him away from show business and into law enforcement. Gabriel served as a police officer for eight years before his problems with drinking and drug abuse caused him to resign. His addictions led to a lengthy arrest record, and he served a number of years in prison.

While in prison, Gabriel once again turned his attention to music. After his release, he continued work on musical projects he had started behind bars, but struggled to stay sober. Producer Brian Oxley, who had recently purchased Johnny Cash's farm in Tennessee and had taken an interest in the Cash family, persuaded Gabriel to go to rehab for the 22nd time and try to succeed.

After a year in rehab, Gabriel began work with Oxley on his first independent album, Long Way Home, released in 2018.

In October 2018, 50 years after his grandfather's legendary live performance at Folsom State Prison in California, Gabriel performed two shows for prison inmates at Folsom State Prison. The singer performed a mix of his own music along with some of Johnny Cash's classic hits.

Gabriel released the single "Right Side of the Dirt" in April 2020. In February 2021, Gabriel released Treehouse Sessions-The Raw and Uncut Acoustic Project, a 7-song ep. This acoustic recording, which was wholly recorded during one short afternoon at Tim Carter's Treehouse Studio in Goodlettsville Tennessee, inspired Gabriel to embark on acoustic duo tours, both in the USA and in Ireland, once the Covid restrictions were lifted.

== Opry debut ==
On the September 12, 2023, Gabriel made his Grand Ole Opry debut in honor of his grandfather, Johnny Cash. The show was dedicated to mark the 20th anniversary of Cash's passing.

Gabriel fronted as the vocalist for The Tennessee Four (a Johnny Cash legacy band, composed of original members of The Tennessee Three, Cash's longtime backing band), performing "Big River", "I Walk the Line", and "Ain't No Grave". Gabriel also accompanied singer-songwriter, Rodney Crowell on "I Walk the Line Revisited".

== Discography ==
- Long Way Home (2018)
- Treehouse Sessions - The Raw and Uncut Acoustic Project (2021)
