= Cindy Cash =

American singer

- Born: July 29, 1959 (age 67)
- Occupations: Singer; author; antiques dealer
- Style: Country
- Spouses: Marty Stuart (m. 1983; div. 1988) Eddie Panetta (m. 2003; died 2009)
- Parents: Johnny Cash (father); Vivian Cash (mother)
- Relatives: Rosanne Cash (sister); John Carter Cash (half-brother)

Cindy Cash (born July 29, 1959) is an American singer, author, and antiques dealer. She is the third of four daughters of singer-songwriter Johnny Cash and his first wife, Vivian (née Liberto).

== Early years ==
Cash is the daughter of singer Johnny Cash and his first wife, Vivian Liberto, who was born and raised in San Antonio, Texas.

The couple lived for a short period in Memphis, Tennessee, but as her father's career expanded, they moved to Los Angeles, California. Her father soon bought farm property in Casitas Springs, California, where Cash lived as a child. Her parents separated in 1962 and divorced in 1966, when Cash was eight years old. Their mother chiefly raised the girls, who saw their father for limited periods during the summers. Their father remarried, to June Carter, another singing star.

Her siblings include singer-songwriter Rosanne Cash, who became a major star. The younger Cash also went into show business for a time and performed as a singer.

== Career ==
Cash performed with her father and her stepmother, June Carter Cash. Her first duet with him as part of his show came when she was 16, and she also sang with him in his last performance.

For two years, she sang in the group The Next Generation, which included Loretta Lynn's daughter Peggy, Conway Twitty's daughter Kathy, and George Jones' and Tammy Wynette's daughter Georgette. They didn't record their songs but traveled to perform on the road.

After Cash retired from entertaining and married Eddie Panetta in 2003, she lived with him in Mississippi. There she operated an antique store in Ridgeland.

Cash started in 1985 to gather photos, letters and stories about and by members of her famous family. Her book, The Cash Family Scrapbook (1997), was published by Crown Publishing Group. She began the account with her parents' marriage and continued up to the time of the book's publication.

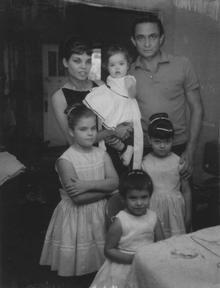
Vivian, Johnny, Cindy and Kids in 1961

== Personal life ==
When she was 18, Cash married her high school sweetheart. They had a daughter together. After they divorced, she moved with her daughter to Hendersonville, Tennessee, to be near her father and his second wife June Carter.

Cash married again, to singer-songwriter Marty Stuart. They met when each was 21. They were married from 1983 to 1988. They divorced.

In 2003, she married Eddie Panetta. He died in a motorcycle accident in 2009.
