= Unearthed (Johnny Cash album) =

2003 compilation album by Johnny Cash

Box set by Johnny Cash
- Released: November 25, 2003
- Recorded: 1993–2002
- Genre: Country
- Length: 242:31
- Label: American Recordings
- Producer: Rick Rubin

Johnny Cash chronology
| American IV: The Man Comes Around (2002) | Unearthed (2003) | Life (2004) |

American series chronology
| American IV: The Man Comes Around (2002) | Unearthed (2003) | American V: A Hundred Highways (2006) |

Professional ratings
Review scores
| Source | Rating |
|---|---|
| AllMusic | 4.5/5 stars |

Unearthed is a box set by American country singer Johnny Cash. It was released by American Recordings on November 25, 2003, two months after Cash's death. The album was compiled by Cash and Rick Rubin, who also produced the set. It was certified Gold on December 2, 2004, by the Recording Industry Association of America.

== Content ==
The first three discs feature outtakes and alternate versions of songs recorded for American Recordings, American II: Unchained, American III: Solitary Man and American IV: The Man Comes Around. The fourth disc, My Mother's Hymn Book, features gospel songs Cash first learned from his mother as a child and was later reissued as a standalone album in 2004. The final disc is a best-of distillation of the first four American albums.

=== Previous recordings ===
Many of the songs Cash recorded during the American sessions were updated versions of songs he had previously recorded.

- "Long Black Veil" was previously recorded by Cash for his 1965 album Orange Blossom Special.
- "Flesh and Blood" was previously recorded by Cash for the soundtrack to the 1970 film I Walk the Line.
- "Understand Your Man" was previously recorded by Cash for his 1964 album I Walk the Line.
- "Banks of the Ohio" was previously recorded by Cash with the Carter Family for the 1964 album Keep on the Sunny Side.
- "The Caretaker" was previously recorded by Cash for his 1959 album Songs of Our Soil.
- "Old Chunk of Coal" was previously recorded by Cash for his 1979 album A Believer Sings the Truth.
- "I'm Going to Memphis" was previously recorded by Cash for his 1960 album Ride This Train.
- "Waiting for the Train" was previously recorded by Cash for his 1963 album Blood, Sweat and Tears.
- "No Earthly Good' was previously recorded by Cash for his 1976 album The Rambler.
- "The Fourth Man in the Fire" was previously recorded by Cash for his 1969 album The Holy Land.
- "Dark as a Dungeon" was previously recorded by Cash as the B-side to his 1964 single "Understand Your Man".
- "I'm Moving On" was previously recorded by Cash in 1984 as a duet with Waylon Jennings. This version would not be released until 2014 on Out Among the Stars.
- "As Long as the Grass Shall Grow" was previously recorded by Cash for his 1964 album Bitter Tears: Ballads of the American Indian.
- "Devil's Right Hand" was previously recorded by Cash with the Highwaymen for the 1995 album The Road Goes on Forever.
- "The L & N Don't Stop Here Anymore" was previously recorded by Cash for his 1979 album Silver.
- "Father and Son" was previously recorded by Cash as "Father and Daughter" for his 1974 album The Junkie and the Juicehead Minus Me.
- "When the Roll Is Called Up Yonder" was previously recorded by Cash for his 1975 album Johnny Cash Sings Precious Memories.
- "If We Never Meet Again This Side of Heaven" was previously recorded by Cash for his 1962 album Hymns from the Heart.
- "Let the Lower Lights Be Burning" was previously recorded by Cash for his 1962 album Hymns from the Heart.
- "When He Reached Down His Hand for Me" was previously recorded by Cash for his 1962 album Hymns from the Heart.
- "In the Sweet By-and-By" was previously recorded by Cash for his 1975 album Sings Precious Memories.
- "Softly and Tenderly" was previously recorded by Cash for his 1975 album Sings Precious Memories.
- "Just as I Am" was previously recorded by Cash for his 1975 album Sings Precious Memories.

== Critical reception ==
Rock historian Graeme Thomson in his monograph, The Resurrection of Johnny Cash: Hurt, Redemption, and American Recordings has called Unearthed a monolithic achievement.

== Track listing ==
Disc 1 – Unearthed, Vol. 1: Who's Gonna Cry
| No. | Title | Writer(s) | Length |
|---|---|---|---|
| 1. | "Long Black Veil" | Danny Dill, Marijohn Wilkin | 3:15 |
| 2. | "Flesh and Blood" | Johnny Cash | 2:29 |
| 3. | "Just the Other Side of Nowhere" | Kris Kristofferson | 3:18 |
| 4. | "If I Give My Soul" | Billy Joe Shaver | 3:01 |
| 5. | "Understand Your Man" | Cash | 2:06 |
| 6. | "Banks of the Ohio" | Maybelle Carter | 4:07 |
| 7. | "Two Timin' Woman" | Hank Snow | 2:06 |
| 8. | "The Caretaker" | Cash | 1:55 |
| 9. | "Old Chunk of Coal" | Billy Joe Shaver | 1:54 |
| 10. | "I'm Going to Memphis" | Cash, Hollie Dew, Alan Lomax | 2:40 |
| 11. | "Breaking Bread" | Cash | 2:48 |
| 12. | "Waiting for a Train" | Jimmie Rodgers | 1:46 |
| 13. | "Casey's Last Ride" | Kristofferson | 3:21 |
| 14. | "No Earthly Good" | Cash | 2:43 |
| 15. | "The Fourth Man in the Fire" | Arthur "Guitar Boogie" Smith | 2:48 |
| 16. | "Dark as a Dungeon" | Merle Travis | 3:00 |
| 17. | "Book Review" (bonus track) | | 2:07 |
| 18. | "Down There by the Train (Alternate Take)" (bonus track) | Tom Waits | 5:49 |
| Total length: | | | 51:13 |

- Note: All tracks previously unreleased. A different take of "Down There by the Train" was issued on the 1994 album American Recordings. "Flesh and Blood" is a newer version of the original that was written for I Walk the Line (Soundtrack).

Disc 2 – Unearthed, Vol. 2: Trouble in Mind
| No. | Title | Writer(s) | Length |
|---|---|---|---|
| 1. | "Pocahontas" | Neil Young | 3:43 |
| 2. | "I'm a Drifter (Version 1)" | Dolly Parton | 3:50 |
| 3. | "Trouble in Mind" | Richard M. Jones | 3:32 |
| 4. | "Down the Line" | Roy Orbison, Sam Phillips | 2:38 |
| 5. | "I'm Moving On" | Hank Snow | 2:54 |
| 6. | "As Long as the Grass Shall Grow" | Peter La Farge, Cash | 4:21 |
| 7. | "Heart of Gold" | Young | 3:01 |
| 8. | "The Running Kind" (with Tom Petty) | Merle Haggard | 3:11 |
| 9. | "Everybody's Trying to Be My Baby" | Carl Perkins | 2:11 |
| 10. | "Brown-Eyed Handsome Man" (with Carl Perkins) | Chuck Berry | 2:21 |
| 11. | "T for Texas" | Rodgers | 3:38 |
| 12. | "Devil's Right Hand" | Steve Earle | 2:33 |
| 13. | "I'm a Drifter (Version 2)" | Parton | 3:45 |
| 14. | "Like a Soldier" (with Willie Nelson) (bonus track) | Cash | 2:55 |
| 15. | "Drive On (Alternate Lyrics)" (bonus track) | Cash | 2:23 |
| 16. | "Bird on a Wire (Live with Orchestra)" (bonus track) | Leonard Cohen | 5:13 |
| Total length: | | | 52:10 |

- Note: All tracks previously unreleased. A solo version of "Like a Soldier", a version of "Drive On" featuring different lyrics, and an acoustic studio version of "Bird on a Wire" were issued on the 1994 album American Recordings.

Disc 3 – Unearthed, Vol. 3: Redemption Songs
| No. | Title | Writer(s) | Length |
|---|---|---|---|
| 1. | "A Singer of Songs" | Tim O'Connell | 2:48 |
| 2. | "The L & N Don't Stop Here Anymore" | Jean Ritchie | 3:13 |
| 3. | "Redemption Song" (with Joe Strummer) | Bob Marley | 3:27 |
| 4. | "Father and Son" (with Fiona Apple) | Cat Stevens | 2:49 |
| 5. | "Chattanooga Sugar Babe" | Norman Blake | 3:16 |
| 6. | "He Stopped Loving Her Today" | Bobby Braddock, Curly Putman | 2:37 |
| 7. | "Hard Times Come Again No More" | Stephen Foster | 4:01 |
| 8. | "Wichita Lineman" | Jimmy Webb | 3:03 |
| 9. | "Cindy" (with Nick Cave) | Traditional | 2:53 |
| 10. | "Big Iron" | Marty Robbins | 3:52 |
| 11. | "Salty Dog" | Traditional, Rudy Toombs | 2:26 |
| 12. | "Gentle on My Mind" (with Glen Campbell) | John Hartford | 3:24 |
| 13. | "You Are My Sunshine" | Jimmie Davis/Charles Mitchell | 3:18 |
| 14. | "You'll Never Walk Alone" | Oscar Hammerstein II, Richard Rodgers | 2:59 |
| 15. | "The Man Comes Around (Early Take)" (bonus track) | Cash | 3:51 |
| Total length: | | | 47:58 |

- Note: All tracks previously unreleased, except "Wichita Lineman" and "Big Iron" which were previously released on the original vinyl pressing of American IV: The Man Comes Around. The final version of "The Man Comes Around" was also released on American IV: The Man Comes Around.

Disc 4 – Unearthed, Vol. 4: My Mother's Hymn Book
| No. | Title | Writer(s) | Length |
|---|---|---|---|
| 1. | "Where We'll Never Grow Old" | James C. Moore | 3:31 |
| 2. | "I Shall Not Be Moved" | Traditional | 2:41 |
| 3. | "I Am a Pilgrim" | Traditional | 2:27 |
| 4. | "Do Lord" | Fossett | 2:12 |
| 5. | "When The Roll Is Called Up Yonder" | James Milton Black | 1:36 |
| 6. | "If We Never Meet Again This Side of Heaven" | Albert E. Brumley | 2:31 |
| 7. | "I'll Fly Away" | Brumley | 1:54 |
| 8. | "Where the Soul of Man Never Dies" | William Lee Golden, Wayne Raney | 2:15 |
| 9. | "Let the Lower Lights Be Burning" | Philip Bliss | 3:14 |
| 10. | "When He Reached Down His Hand for Me" | Marion Easterling, Thomas Wright, J.F.B. Wright | 2:14 |
| 11. | "In the Sweet By-and-By" | Sanford Fillmore Bennett, Joseph Philbrick Webster | 2:25 |
| 12. | "I'm Bound for the Promised Land" | Traditional | 2:15 |
| 13. | "In the Garden" | C. Austin Miles | 3:18 |
| 14. | "Softly and Tenderly" | Will L. Thompson | 3:17 |
| 15. | "Just as I Am" | William Batchelder Bradbury, Charlotte Elliot | 2:38 |
| Total length: | | | 38:28 |

- Note: All tracks previously unreleased.

Disc 5 – Unearthed, Vol. 5: Best of Cash on American
| No. | Title | Writer(s) | Original release | Length |
|---|---|---|---|---|
| 1. | "Delia's Gone" | Silbersdorf, Toops | American Recordings (1994) | 2:19 |
| 2. | "Bird on a Wire" | Leonard Cohen | American Recordings (1994) | 4:04 |
| 3. | "Thirteen" | Glenn Danzig | American Recordings (1994) | 3:23 |
| 4. | "Rowboat" | Beck | American II: Unchained (1996) | 3:45 |
| 5. | "The One Rose (That's Left in My Heart)" | Lyon, McIntire | American II: Unchained (1996) | 2:28 |
| 6. | "Rusty Cage" | Chris Cornell | American II: Unchained (1996) | 2:50 |
| 7. | "Southern Accents" | Tom Petty | American II: Unchained (1996) | 4:42 |
| 8. | "Mercy Seat" | Nick Cave, Mick Harvey | American III: Solitary Man (2000) | 4:35 |
| 9. | "Solitary Man" | Neil Diamond | American III: Solitary Man (2000) | 2:25 |
| 10. | "Wayfaring Stranger" | Traditional | American III: Solitary Man (2000) | 3:22 |
| 11. | "One" | Bono, Clayton, Edge, Mullen | American III: Solitary Man (2000) | 3:52 |
| 12. | "I Hung My Head" | Sting | American IV: The Man Comes Around (2002) | 3:52 |
| 13. | "The Man Comes Around" | Johnny Cash | American IV: The Man Comes Around (2002) | 4:29 |
| 14. | "We'll Meet Again" | Hughie Charles, Ross Parker | American IV: The Man Comes Around (2002) | 2:57 |
| 15. | "Hurt" | Trent Reznor | American IV: The Man Comes Around (2002) | 3:38 |
| Total length: | | | | 52:14 |

- Note: All tracks previously released, although "Thirteen" features an additional verse that was omitted from its original album release.

== Personnel ==
Adapted from the album liner notes.

- Johnny Cash – Vocals, Guitar, Arranger, Adaptation
- Glen Campbell – Vocals, Performer
- Fiona Apple – Vocals
- Nick Cave – Vocals, Performer
- Joe Strummer – Vocals
- John Carter Cash – Performer, Arranger, Engineer, Associate Producer, Adaptation
- David R. Ferguson – Performer, Engineer, Mixing
- D. Sardy – Performer, Engineer, Mixing
- Greg Fidelman – Performer, Mixing
- Bill Bateman – Performer
- Norman Blake – Performer
- Thom Bresh – Performer
- Lester Butler – Performer
- Mike Campbell – Performer
- Laura Cash – Performer
- Jack Clement – Performer
- Sheryl Crow – Performer
- Howie Epstein – Performer
- Steve Ferrone – Performer
- Flea – Performer
- John Frusciante – Performer
- Terry Harrington – Performer
- Smokey Hormel – Performer
- Willie Nelson - Performer
- Rami Jaffee – Performer
- Roger Joseph Manning Jr. – Performer
- Carl Perkins – Performer
- Larry Perkins – Performer
- Tom Petty – Performer
- Juliet Prater – Performer
- David Roe – Performer
- Randy Scruggs – Performer
- Paul "The Kid" Size – Performer
- Chad Smith – Performer
- Marty Stuart – Performer
- Benmont Tench – Performer
- Jimmy Tittle – Performer
- Rick Rubin – Producer
- Richard Dodd, Thom Russo, Andrew Scheps, David Schiffman, Chuck Turner – Engineers
- Sylvia Massy – Engineer, Mixing
- Jim Scott – Mixing
- Vlado Meller – Mastering
- Steven Kadison – Assistant
- Christine Cano – Art Direction, Design, Photography
- Martyn Atkins, Andy Earl – Photography
- Lindsay Chase – Production Coordination
- Sylvie Simmons – Interviewer, Text

== Charts ==
Album – Billboard (United States)

| Chart (2003) | Peak position |
|---|---|
| US Top Country Albums (Billboard) | 33 |

== Certifications ==
| Region | Certification | Certified units/sales |
|---|---|---|
| United States (RIAA) | Gold | 500,000^{^} |
^{^} Shipments figures based on certification alone.

== My Mother's Hymn Book ==
My Mother's Hymn Book

Studio album by Johnny Cash
- Released: April 6, 2004
- Recorded: October 12 – November 1, 1993
- Studio: Cedar Hill Refuge Studio (Hendersonville)
- Genre: Gospel
- Length: 38:28
- Label: American Recordings
- Producer: Rick Rubin

Johnny Cash chronology
| Life (2004) | My Mother's Hymn Book (2004) | The Legend (2005) |

Professional ratings
Review scores
| Source | Rating |
|---|---|
| Allmusic | 4.5/5 stars |
| The Encyclopedia of Popular Music | 4/5 stars |

My Mother's Hymn Book is a collection of Christian spiritual songs and hymns that Cash originally learned from his mother while growing up. The album features only Cash's voice and a single acoustic guitar. This disc was released as a stand-alone disc the following year (his 89th overall album) under the same title, and peaked at #9 on the Christian music album chart. In the album's liner notes Cash mentions that this is his favorite album he ever made.

Tracks 6, 9 and 10 were previously recorded for Hymns from the Heart (1962); tracks 5, 11, 14 and 15 were previously recorded for Sings Precious Memories (1975); and track 7 was recorded in concert for The Survivors Live (1982). Several other songs, such as track 13, had been performed by Cash on TV or live in concert, but formal studio recordings had not yet been issued until now.

Although the images used on the standalone CD depict Cash near the end of his life, most of the recordings on My Mother's Hymn Book actually date to Cash's early sessions for American in 1993–1994 (hence the fact they only feature Cash performing by himself).

=== Track listing ===
My Mother's Hymn Book
| No. | Title | Writer(s) | Length |
|---|---|---|---|
| 1. | "Where We'll Never Grow Old" | James C. Moore | 3:31 |
| 2. | "I Shall Not Be Moved" | V.O. Fossett | 2:41 |
| 3. | "I Am a Pilgrim" | Merle Travis | 2:27 |
| 4. | "Do Lord" | Fossett | 2:12 |
| 5. | "When The Roll Is Called Up Yonder" | James Milton Black | 1:36 |
| 6. | "If We Never Meet Again This Side of Heaven" | Albert E. Brumley | 2:31 |
| 7. | "I'll Fly Away" | Brumley | 1:54 |
| 8. | "Where the Soul of Man Never Dies" | William Lee Golden, Wayne Raney | 2:15 |
| 9. | "Let the Lower Lights Be Burning" | Philip Bliss | 3:14 |
| 10. | "When He Reached Down His Hand for Me" | Marion Easterling, Thomas Wright, J.F.B. Wright | 2:14 |
| 11. | "In the Sweet By-and-By" | Sanford Fillmore Bennett, Joseph Philbrick Webster | 2:25 |
| 12. | "I'm Bound for the Promised Land" | Traditional | 2:15 |
| 13. | "In the Garden" | C. Austin Miles | 3:18 |
| 14. | "Softly and Tenderly" | Will L. Thompson | 3:17 |
| 15. | "Just as I Am" | William Batchelder Bradbury, Charlotte Elliot | 2:38 |
| Total length: | | | 38:28 |

=== Personnel ===
Adapted from the album liner notes.

- Karen Adams – Group Member
- Craig Allen – Design
- Martyn Atkins – Photography
- John Carter Cash – Liner Notes, Associate Producer
- Rosanne Cash – Liner Notes
- Lindsay Chase – Production Coordination
- Steven Kadison – Assistant
- Vlado Meller – Mastering
- Rick Rubin – Producer
