= Loney Hutchins =

American musician, songwriter, and music publisher

- Born: November 7, 1946 (age 79); Sullivan County, Tennessee, United States
- Genres: country; bluegrass
- Years active: 1973–present
- Website: loneyhutchins.country

Loney Fred Hutchins (born 1946) is an American songwriter, singer, music publisher, music therapist, restaurateur, and painter. He is best known for his songs "Still Dancing" and "Love Can Cure a Heartache" and for his longtime association with Johnny Cash and June Carter Cash. He continues to write, record and tour.

== Early life and musical beginnings ==
Loney Hutchins was born in 1946 into an impoverished community known informally as Rock City, near Kingsport, Tennessee in rural Appalachia, near the Tennessee-Virginia border. He has attributed the unusual spelling of his name to his parents' illiteracy and his mother asking her sister, who could read and write, to write his name, but spelled "Lonnie" the way she pronounced it in her thick Southern accent, "Loney." Growing up in a family of dirt farmers and timber workers, he was immersed in the traditional folk music of that region.

He enlisted in the Army in 1966. After studying missile/electronics technology at Fort Bliss, Texas, he worked at a missile site for ARADCOM (Army Air Defence Command) in Grafton, Illinois, then served in Germany and the U.S. as a communications chief and CBR instructor. In 1969 he enrolled at Kansas State University in Manhattan, Kansas to study electronic engineering.

While in college he answered an ad for a country music singer, and with fellow musicians formed a country rock group, first called The Hired Hands, later called Hickory Wind, named after the song by The Byrds. He filled the roles of bandleader, booker, promoter, and publisher as the group played across the region.

Around 1972 he left Hickory Wind behind and made the move to Nashville with his wife Joan to pursue music professionally. Upon running into June Carter Cash by the Hendersonville office of House of Cash (the Cashes' BMI publishing entity), the two discovered that they were from the same area and had gone to the same high school, leading to a meeting with her husband Johnny Cash. After hearing Hutchins's song demo reel Cash signed Hutchins as a writer with House of Cash. His songs then appeared on recordings by Johnny Cash, by his brother Tommy Cash, and by Mel McDaniel. Johnny Cash included Hutchins' song "Jesus" on his 1974 album The Junkie and the Juicehead Minus Me. McDaniel recorded Hutchins' "Mountain Eyes" on his 1983 Capitol Records album Naturally Country. Tommy Cash released Hutchins' song "She Still Has That Look In Her Eyes" in 1976. Hutchins also appears as a fictional "Loney" (with that spelling in the sheet music) in Johnny Cash's song "Sold Out of Flagpoles," a single from on his 1976 album One Piece at a Time that reached No. 29 on the Country Music Singles chart.

== Music career: 1970s–1980s ==
In the winter of 1974-75 Johnny Cash agreed to back Hutchins in renovating an abandoned building on Cash's property outside Nashville to use as a practice and performance space. Hutchins proceeded to use the venue, today known as Storytellers Hideaway Farm, to stage a series of "Saturday Night in Hickman County" concerts, which featured well-known artists including Johnny Cash, June Carter Cash, Jack Routh, Carlene Carter, and Rosanne Cash.

In March 1976 Hutchins's relationship with the Cashes led to a position as publishing manager for House of Cash, for which he was already a writer, and Song of Cash (their ASCAP publishing entity). Hutchins also served as a pitch man for the publishing label, landing and recording Guy Clark's first cut by a major artist (Johnny Cash), "Texas 1947." Producer Don Davis brought to him the Wayne Kemp song "One Piece at a Time" which Hutchins convinced Cash to record. It became the title track of Cash's 1976 album, and Cash's last recording to hit #1 on the Billboard Hot Country Singles chart.

In 1977, after Hutchins left the House of Cash publishing house, he started his own publishing house, Appalachia Music Publishing (BMI). It published his forthcoming songs including his hits of the 1980s. He also graduated from college (the first in his family to do so), receiving a BS in music and with a minor in anthropology at the University of Tennessee. He continued to work at the House of Cash studios along with Charlie Bragg, who had purchased the studio in the House of Cash offices.

In 1979 Hutchins recorded a series of tracks at Lee Hazen's Studio By the Pond, with Jack "Stack-a-Track" Grochmal engineering, for an album of his own called Appalachia.

In 1981 he signed a publishing deal with Cedarwood Publishing. In 1983 Hutchins began his own record label, Appalachia Recording Company (ARC). That year he released his album Appalachia Music. It was composed of tracks from the earlier Appalachia album along with some new '80s-style country/adult contemporary ballads. Finding that the new album was considered too "folksie" for LA and too "rock" for Nashville, Hutchins released it independently on his own LFH Records and Tapes, which became ARC.

== 1980s hits ==
Through 1987 he released a series of singles on the label. "Love Can Cure a Heartache" hit Cash Box's Indie Top 20 in October 1986 and spent four weeks in the Cash Box Top 100 Country Singles chart that fall, reaching the No. 72 slot. In June 1987 his single "Still Dancing" reached No. 17 on Cash Box's Indie Top 20 chart, No. 74 on the Cash Box Country Singles Chart, and No. 92 on Billboard's Hot Country Singles chart.

== Music therapy ==
In 1986, Hutchins entered the field of music therapy, working with the Rebound nursing home care company to help treat survivors of traumatic brain injury and explaining to the Los Angeles Times that writing songs and singing helps patients express feelings and rebuild their vocabularies and cognitive functions. He provided one-and-one music therapy and also formed a choral group, The Rebound Revivors, which appeared at head injury conferences and made television appearances.

In the early 1990s he founded 21st Century Living Services, a TBI nursing home, where he continued music therapy with clients. He remained with 21st Century Living Services until 2016, when he resigned to settle legal affairs.

== 1990s–21st century ==
In the early 1990s Hutchins formed a bluegrass trio and performed in that format through most of the decade. He returned to country music recording in 2008, when he released the album My Tennessee Hills. On it he revisited much of his old material, this time performing it mostly in bluegrass style. He also entered the restaurant business, owning The Whippoorwill, a restaurant and live music venue, in downtown Gallatin, Tennessee, from 2010 to 2014.

In 2020, Hutchins' son Loney John Hutchins relaunched Appalachia Record Company (ARC) to release new and reissued material by Loney Fred Hutchins and others. The elder Hutchins lives in Tennessee, where he continues to write and record and to perform with a new band.
