= Johnny Cash Museum =

Museum in Nashville, Tennessee

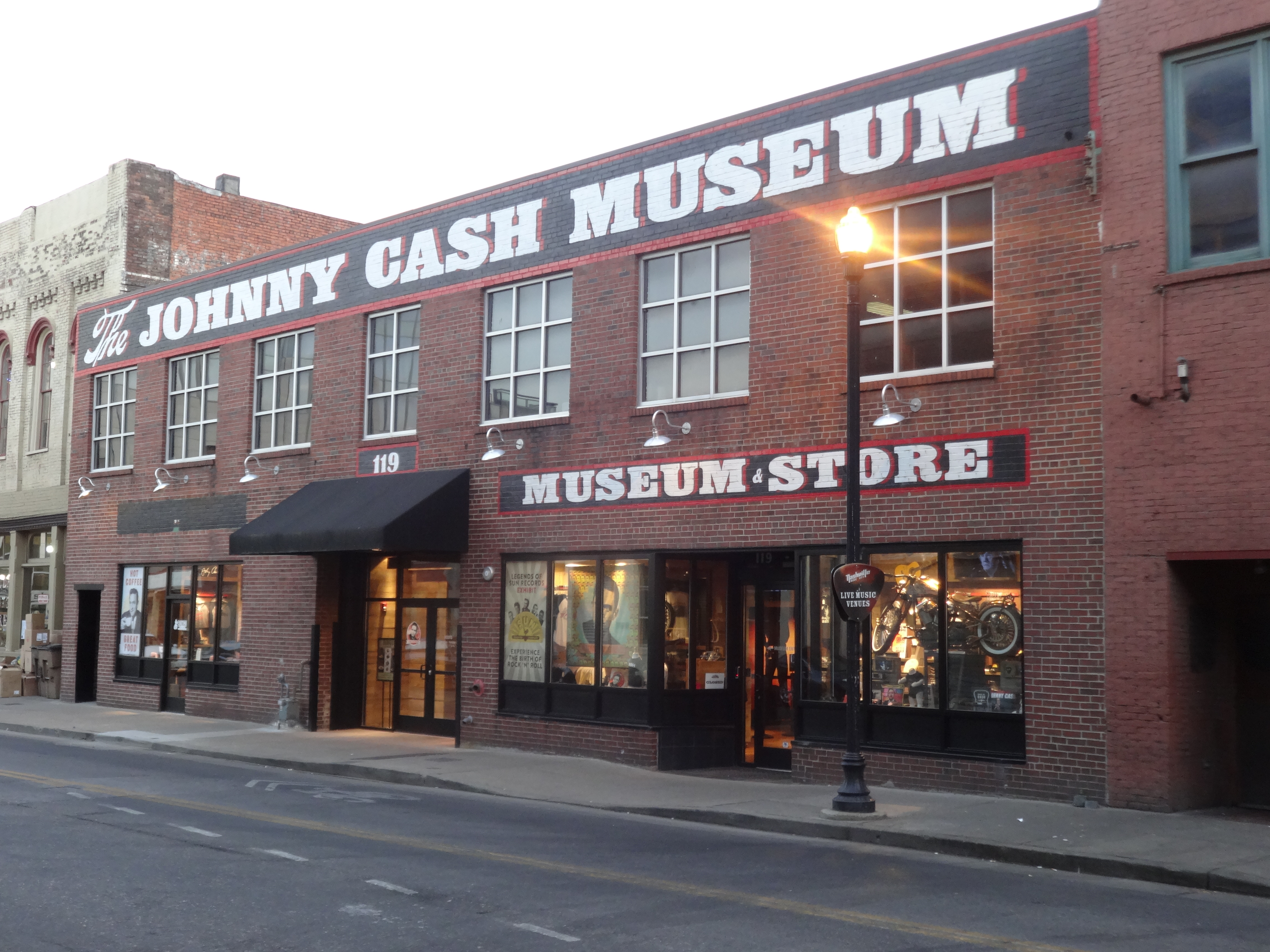
- Johnny Cash Museum
- Location: 119 3rd Ave., S., Nashville, Tennessee
- Coordinates: 36°9′40″N 86°46′33″W
- Founder: Bill Miller
- Website: johnnycashmuseum.com

The Johnny Cash Museum opened in May 2013 in Nashville, Tennessee, to honor the life and music of the country superstar often referred to as the "Man in Black." It houses the world's largest collection of Johnny Cash memorabilia and artifacts, including a stone wall taken from his lake house in Hendersonville, Tennessee, and is officially authorized by Cash's estate.

== History ==
Born in 1932 in Kingsland, Arkansas, Johnny Cash is one of the bestselling recording artists of all time. Throughout his lifetime, he wrote and recorded music in a lot of different styles, including country, rockabilly, gospel, blues, and rock and roll, and he has been inducted into the Rock and Roll Hall of Fame, the Gospel Music Hall of Fame, the Country Music Hall of Fame, the Nashville Songwriters Hall of Fame, and the Memphis Music Hall of Fame. His trademark nickname – Man in Black – came from the signature all-black wardrobe he wore for performances.

The original museum honoring the star – known as House of Cash – was in Hendersonville, Tennessee. The House of Cash had been closed for many years and had fallen into a state of disrepair, and appeared in Cash's music video "Hurt".

Cash's lakeside home in Hendersonville, that he lived in from 1968 until his death, burned in an accidental fire during renovations in 2007. Shannon and Bill Miller – personal friends of Cash – used their personal collection of memorabilia to found the current Johnny Cash Museum in Nashville. The museum opened to the public in 2013 with the restored original House of Cash sign as one of its exhibits.

== Location and site details ==
The museum is located in the busy South of Broadway (SoBro) neighborhood, in the heart of downtown Nashville at 119 3rd Ave S. It is open daily (except Thanksgiving and Christmas) and charges admission for anyone 6 years and older.

A museum expansion took place in 2016 to add interactive exhibits, such as technology centers to create mixes of Cash's songs and listen to covers of his music by dozens of artists. Visitors can also pose in front of a green screen to take photos with Cash to take home. The site is wheelchair accessible. Group tour options are available. The Johnny Cash Museum does not own or operate any downtown parking but various nearby lots and garages are available.

== Exhibits ==
The Johnny Cash Museum chronicles Cash's life, from his early years and Air Force career to his personal life and music career, including memorabilia from his famous prison concerts. Exhibits are arranged in chronological order, with more than 1,000 artifacts on display, consisting of personal items, memorabilia, and interactive exhibits. One example is the "Progression of Sound" exhibit, which focuses on Cash's crossovers into different styles and genres of music on various types of recording media, including LPs, 8-tracks, and CDs.

Another section focuses on Sun Records, the Memphis label that helped launch Cash's career – along with the careers of Elvis Presley, Jerry Lee Lewis, Roy Orbison and Carl Perkins. Besides items belonging to Cash, other items in this section include a pair of glasses worn by Roy Orbison, a microphone used by Elvis Presley, and the drum set belonging to WS "Fluke" Holland – Cash's friend and drummer for 40 years. (The set was also the first full drum set used on the Grand Ole Opry stage.) Visitors can play video footage of Cash's collaborations with other legendary performers.

An exhibit that focuses on his TV and movie career includes clips of Cash hosting his own variety show, clips of his appearances on Dr. Quinn, Medicine Woman and Hee Haw, and various props and costumes from the movie Walk the Line as well as several of Cash's movies. Movie and show posters are also on display.

According to Cash's family, he used a folded dollar bill threaded through the strings of his guitar to mimic a percussion sound in the years before he had a drummer. That Martin guitar – with the dollar bill still threaded through the strings – is on display at the museum along with numerous other artifacts, including:

- Stage costumes, including his infamous prison jumpsuit costume
- Handwritten letters and notes
- Handwritten lyrics
- Yearbook page
- Vintage guitar amps
- Air Force uniform and other Air Force memorabilia
- Gold and platinum records
- Numerous music instruments
- School report cards
- Cash family piano
- Highwaymen memorabilia
- Grammy and CMA awards
- Bag of cotton from childhood home in Dyess, Arkansas
- Personal belongings, such as photographs, items from his home, and his personal bible
- Birth certificate
- Future Farmers of America card

In May 2018, Cash's first gold record – "I Walk the Line" – was put on display after being recovered from a European collector. The record is now certified double platinum. The final exhibit near the exit of the museum plays the music video for "Hurt" – Cash's cover of the popular Nine Inch Nails song and his final music video.

== Recognition ==
The Johnny Cash Museum has received recognition from various travel-based organizations since its opening. It is one of only six attractions in Nashville to earn a AAA Gem rating, and both National Geographic and Forbes rank it near the top of their lists for travel destinations.

The museum has now been open for a decade and continues to welcome guests from all over the world. The Johnny Cash Museum was voted the Best Music Museum in the US in 2023 by USA Today/10 Best Reader's Choice Travel Awards.

The museum is #5 on U.S. News & World Report's list of "Best Things to Do in Nashville" and is rated a kid-friendly site by Nashville Parent magazine. Additionally, the museum was on TripAdvisor's list of Top 25 Trending U.S. Attractions for Summer 2017 and also its list of Top 10 Trending U.S. Attractions for Fall 2017.

Conde Nast Traveler (Worldwide) rates it the #1 Must Visit Museum for Music Lovers, and Forbes calls it the #1 Must See Nashville Destination. It is the #1 Pitch Perfect Museum according to National Geographic (Worldwide) and is one of the Top 10 Best Attractions in Nashville according to USA Today. Former U.S. Vice President Al Gore – a Tennessee native – called it a "world-class museum, a major tourist attraction, and a major tourist destination for the millions of people that love Johnny Cash – a world class collection."

Additional published recognition by media sources include:

- Top 5 Museums Dedicated to Pop-Rock Music (Worldwide) – Marie Claire
- Top 3 Best Things to Do in Nashville – Orbitz
- 7 Great American Vacation Spots (That Won't Bust Your Budget) – Time
- 22 Reasons You Should Visit Nashville – Huffington Post
- Top 10 Tennessee Spots for Music Lovers – Rolling Stone
- Best Culture Stop in Nashville – Money Magazine

== See also ==
- House of Cash
- Johnny Cash Boyhood Home
- List of music museums
- List of museums in Tennessee
