= Look at Them Beans =

Studio album by Johnny Cash
- Released: September 29, 1975
- Studio: House of Cash Recording Studios, Hendersonville, Tennessee
- Genre: Country
- Length: 29:09
- Label: Columbia
- Producer: Don Davis; Charlie Bragg

Johnny Cash chronology
John R. Cash (1975)	Look at Them Beans (1975)	Strawberry Cake (1976)

Singles from One Piece at a Time
- 1. "Look at Them Beans" Released: 1975; 2. "Texas 1947" Released: 1975

Look at Them Beans is the 52nd overall album by country singer Johnny Cash, released in 1975 on Columbia Records. Following an unsuccessful attempt with the previous album, John R. Cash to update Cash's sound with a new set of session musicians (including members of Elvis Presley's stage band), Look at Them Beans reinstated The Tennessee Three as Cash's core session group.

The cover depicts him with his son, John Carter Cash, while the back cover features a dedication to Johnny Cash by his wife, June Carter Cash.

The album reached #38 on the Country Album Chart, while the title track, as the only released single, peaked at #17.

Professional ratings
Review scores
Source	Rating
Allmusic	2/5 stars

== Track listing ==
No.	Title	Writer(s)	Length
1.	"Texas - 1947"	Guy Clark	3:10
2.	"What Have You Got Planned Tonight, Diana"	Dave Kirby	4:05
3.	"Look at Them Beans"	Joe Tex	2:58
4.	"No Charge"	Harlan Howard	3:17
5.	"I Hardly Ever Sing Beer Drinking Songs"	Johnny Cash	2:40
6.	"Down the Road I Go"	Don Williams	2:28
7.	"I Never Met a Man Like You Before"	Johnny Cash	3:00
8.	"All Around Cowboy"	Len Pollard, Jack Wesley Routh	2:50
9.	"Gone"	Helen Carter, June Carter Cash	3:40
10.	"Down at Drippin' Springs"	Johnny Cash	2:25

== Personnel ==
- Johnny Cash - vocals, guitar
- Bob Wootton, Jerry Hensley, Pete Wade, James Colvard, Dave Kirby, Kelso Herston, Glenn Keener - guitar
- Marshall Grant, Henry Strzelecki, Joe Allen - bass
- WS Holland, Kenny Malone, Jerry Carrigan, Willie Ackerman - drums
- Bobby Thompson - guitar, banjo
- Curly Chalker - steel guitar
- Johnny Gimble, Buddy Spicher, Marcy Gates, Marjorie Gates, Tommy Jackson - fiddle
- David Briggs, Earl Poole Ball - piano
- Shane Keister - keyboards
- George Tidwell, George Cunningham - trumpet
- The Nashville Edition - vocals

== Additional personnel ==
- Produced by Don Davis
- "Texas, 1947" and "I Hardly Ever Sing Beer Drinking Songs" produced by Charlie Bragg
- Engineered by Charlie Bragg, Roger Tucker, David Malloy and Freeman Ramsey at the House of Cash Studio, Hendersonville, Tennessee
- Design by Bill Barnes
- Photography by Marion Ward and Bill Barnes
- Liner notes by June Carter Cash

== Charts ==
Chart performance for Look at Them Beans
Chart (1975)	Peak position
US Top Country Albums (Billboard)	38
