= Thelma and the Sleaze =

American Southern rock band

- Origin: Nashville, Tennessee U.S.
- Genres: Southern rock; Rock and roll
- Years active: 2010–present
- Members: Lauren "LG" Gilbert
- Website: Thelma and the Sleaze

Thelma and the Sleaze is an independent all-female, queer southern rock band from Nashville, Tennessee. The group is the brain-child of lead vocalist and guitar player Lauren "LG" Gilbert.

== History ==
In 2005, Gilbert – who was born in Kankakee, Illinois but grew up in Kentucky and Iowa – came to Nashville at the age of 21 to study audio engineering. In 2006, Gilbert joined the all-female punk rock band the Trampskirts as a guitar player. Gilbert was in Trampskirts until 2009 when the band dissolved.

Gilbert and Baby Angel were inspired to start a band as they were sleeping in a van and thought a vandal was breaking into it. On an instinct, Baby Angel reflexively grabbed an extension cable to defend them both. Taken back by the gesture, LG referred to their relationship as "Thelma and the Sleaze", a play on words from the film Thelma & Louise, a 1991 American crime drama female buddy film which features two best friends escaping to Mexico after Louise violently defended Thelma from her attacker.

In 2010, Gilbert and fellow Trampskirts band members including drummer Jacki Macri and bass player Emily "Baby Angel" Zimmer founded Thelma and the Sleaze.

The band's first show was on November 8, 2010. One member of Trampskirts departed after their first show and then in 2011, drummer Jacki Macri left the band. The band added Chase Lombardo (formerly known as Chase "Tender" Noelle) on drums and Beth Finney on lead guitar. The lineup of Gilbert, Zimmer, Noelle and Finney debuted on February 7, 2012, opening for Jack White's Black Belles.

In March 2012, the band recorded the Pillage EP. Shortly thereafter Finney left the band.

In 2012 and 2013 Gilbert, Zimmer and Lombardo wrote recorded and produced The Pamela Handerson EP and two other EPs called These Boots Won't Lick Themselves and Heart Like A Fist. In 2014, Zimmer stepped back from the band. Gilbert and Lombardo brought in Reilly "Gigi" Gallagher to play bass on a more aggressive national touring schedule. Gallagher, who attended Belmont University, was in a relationship with Lombardo throughout her time in the band.

In early 2015, the live album Greatest Hits Live was released, featuring Gilbert, Lombardo and Gallagher. The cover art was designed by Lombardo, using a photo taken from a live show in Lexington, showcasing when Gilbert used her guitar to defend herself from an audience member who groped her while performing. During the dramatic altercation, Lombardo cleared a six foot jump from behind the drums to assist the removal of audience member by associates of the Lexington chapter of Keghunters motorcycle club, also visible in the album art.

In February 2016, the band organized "Kandyland; The Worlds First Intra-City Tour", an immersive experience where the band performed a free show every single night in Nashville at non-traditional locations (laundromat, chocolate factory, etc) – 31 shows in 29 days. During the tour, the band gave away a raffle ticket at each show to each person in attendance, and at the end, they raffled the tickets and gave away a custom mini van painted by the band and other Nashville artists. Director Seth Graves filmed the one-city tour, which was released as the documentary, Kandyland: The Movie, and premiered at Nashville Film Festival on April 17, 2017.

On March 23, 2016 at a show in Athens, Georgia, Gallagher had an onstage altercation which resulted in her leaving the stage and band in the middle of the concert. Gilbert, and new organ player Amaia "Coochie Coochie" Aguirre finished the show.

Thelma and the Sleaze has opened for The Eagles of Death Metal, as well as Charles Bradley. In June 2016, Lombardo moved to New York City and joined the band Boytoy. and then founded American post-punk band and multi-media collective cumgirl8

During the last six months of 2016, Gilbert put Thelma and the Sleaze on hiatus. Toward the end of 2016, she lived in Akron, Ohio and made guitar effects pedals at Earthquaker Devices. During this time, Gilbert recorded several songs with friends and that became the Mid-American Drift EP 2016.

In 2017, after several years in the making, the band's first full-length LP Somebody's Doin' Something was released. The record included contributions from Brittany Howard (Alabama Shakes), Jade Payne (Aye Nako), and Tristen Gaspadarek, among others. The record release was accompanied by a video called "Secretary".

Thelma and the Sleaze had a rotating tour lineup. Among the musicians regularly used include drummer Shaylee "Snowflake" Walsh, Chloe "Whiskers" Katerndahl, Helen "Shy-anne" Gilley and Aguirre. Touring highlights in 2017 included a run with country duo Birdcloud.

In 2018, Gilbert took on the role of the character of religious church lady Roberta Flatbush in an attempt to raise funds for a van. The social media video series brought in more than $5,000 and the band was able to secure the transportation. At the close of 2018, Gilbert recorded an audio history of the band along with insights on her creative process and how she handles the business of being an independent national touring act for the podcast Queen of Shit Mountain.

Also in 2018, recording began on the second full-length LP Fuck, Marry, Kill. Noelle and Zimmer were brought back in for session work. Thelma and the Sleaze produced, with Loney Hutchins on engineering, and Jim Kissling (Ex Hex, King Tuff, The Dirtbombs, The Go) mixing and mastering the record. Cover art is by Lindsey Cooper.

In August 2019, Fuck, Marry, Kill was released on The What of Whom and Burger Records. The album got positive reviews. As part of the album release, Thelma and the Sleaze were the supporting act on the first two dates of Brittany Howard's new tour.

== Band members ==
- Lauren "LG" Gilbert – vocals, guitar

Past members

- Chase Lombardo a.k.a. Chase "Tender" Noelle – drums
- Emily "Baby Angel" Zimmer – bass
- Jacki Macri – drums
- Beth Finney – lead guitar
- Chloe "Whiskers" Katerndahl – bass
- Helen "Shy-anne" Gilley – guitar
- Reilly "Gigi" Gallagher – bass
- Amaia "Coochie Coochie" Aguirre – organ/keyboards
- Shaylee "Snowflake" Walsh – drums
- Liliana "Luscious" Jones - guitar

== Filmography ==
- 2011: Orca Park Soundtrack – performer as bar band: "Change Your Mind"
- 2015: Nashville – backing band
- 2017: Kandyland: The Movie (Documentary) – band

== Discography ==
=== Albums ===
- 2017: Somebody's Doin' Something (Last Hurrah Recordings (vinyl) / Burger Records (cassette))
- 2019: Fuck. Marry. Kill. (The What of Whom (vinyl) / Burger Records (cassette))

=== Singles & EPs ===
- 2012: Be Greedy / Someone's Little Sister and Hollow by Fuckshow 7-inch split (self released)
- 2012: Pillage
- 2013: The Pamela Handerson EP (self released)
- 2013: These Boots Won't Lick Themselves
- 2014: Heart Like A Fist
- 2015: Greatest Hits Live
- 2016: Greatest Hitz Vol. 1
- 2016: Kandyland 7-inch (self-released)
- 2016: Where You Belong / Country Life by Dogs of Oz 7-inch (self-released)
- 2016: Christmas Sampler 2016
- Untitled cassette single (Cold Lunch Recordings)
- 2017: Somebody's Doin' Something - "Secretary / "Why you wanna do that?" (cassingle)
- 2018: Lonely Girl / Handyman by Craig Brown Band cassingle (Burger Records)
- 2018: Mid-American Drift 2016
- 2018: Dirt 7-inch demos of 3 tracks ("Dirt"/"Candy Anne"/"Mary Beth") from Fuck. Marry. Kill. (The What of Whom)
- 2019: Pain single (The What of Whom)
