= Strawberry Cake =

Live album by Johnny Cash
- Released: March 1976
- Recorded: September 21–22, 1975
- Venue: London Palladium, London
- Genre: Country
- Length: 35:03
- Label: Columbia
- Producer: Charlie Bragg

Johnny Cash chronology
Look at Them Beans (1975)	Strawberry Cake (1976)	One Piece at a Time (1976)

Singles from Strawberry Cake
- 1. "Strawberry Cake" Released: 1976

Professional ratings
Review scores
Source	Rating
AllMusic	2/5 stars

Strawberry Cake is a live album and 53rd overall album by American country singer Johnny Cash, released on Columbia Records in 1976. The album includes numerous pieces of between-song stage banter. The album includes several of Cash's most well-known early songs, such as "Big River", "I Still Miss Someone" and "Rock Island Line", as well as a number of more obscure compositions, some of which were performed by Cash for the first time; this includes "Strawberry Cake" and "Navajo". The title track was released as a single, but did poorly on the charts, peaking at No. 54.

The concert was held and recorded at the London Palladium on September 21, 1975. An IRA bomb threat warning was given as June Carter Cash started to sing "The Church in the Wildwood" meant the theatre had to be evacuated but the show continued after the building was searched. The bomb threat announcement and the subsequent evacuation order is included on the recording and is, in fact, a "hidden" track and is not listed on the record sleeve or CD cover. Later, prior to the performance of "Destination Victoria Station," June Carter Cash is heard joking that the threat might have been made because she was about to sing.

Track 7 is mislabelled on the sleeve as "Dialogue" but is, in fact, a comedic a capella duet performance by Cash and June Carter Cash of "Another Man Done Gone", a song Cash had recorded for Blood, Sweat and Tears. Prior to performing "Rock Island Line", a song Cash recorded for Sun Records, singer Lonnie Donegan, who had a major US hit with the song, is introduced in the audience.

== Track listing ==
No.	Title	Writer(s)	Length
1.	"Big River"	Johnny Cash	3:07
2.	"Dialogue"	—	0:39
3.	"Doin' My Time"	Jimmie Skinner	2:28
4.	"Dialogue"	—	0:23
5.	"I Still Miss Someone"	Johnny Cash, Roy Cash Jr.	2:55
6.	"Dialogue"	—	0:43
7.	"Another Man Done Gone" (mislabelled as "Dialogue")	Ruby Pickens Tartt, Vera Hall, John A. Lomax, Alan Lomax	1:11
8.	"I Got Stripes"	Cash, Charlie Williams	2:19
9.	"Dialogue (introduction of June Carter Cash)"	—	0:38
10.	"The Church in the Wildwood" (not listed on sleeve; interrupted by evacuation announcement)	—	0:43
11.	"The Church in the Wildwood" / "Lonesome Valley"	A. P. Carter	3:03
12.	"Dialogue"	—	1:18
13.	"Strawberry Cake"	Johnny Cash	3:06
14.	"Dialogue (introduction of Lonnie Donegan)"	—	0:44
15.	"Rock Island Line"	Lead Belly (Arr. Cash)	3:25
16.	"Navajo"	Johnny Cash	2:59
17.	"Dialogue"	—	1:09
18.	"Destination Victoria Station"	Johnny Cash	2:48
19.	"The Fourth Man"	Arthur "Guitar Boogie" Smith	2:34

== Personnel ==
- Johnny Cash - vocals, acoustic guitar
- June Carter Cash - vocals, acoustic guitar
- The Carter Family - vocals
- Marshall Grant - bass
- W.S. Holland - drums
- Bob Wootton - electric guitar
- Jerry Hensley - electric guitar
- Larry McCoy - piano

Additional personnel

- Charlie Bragg - producer, engineer
- Mixed at House of Cash Recording Studios, Hendersonville, Tennessee
- Bill Barnes - album design
- Chance Martin - cover photography
- Hope Powell - flyleaf photography
- Johnny Cash, Charlie Bragg - liner notes

== Charts ==
Album – Billboard (United States)

Year	Chart	Position
1976	Country Albums	33

Singles – Billboard (United States)

Year	Single	Chart	Position
1976	"Strawberry Cake"	Country Singles	54
