= Love, God, Murder =

2000 compilation album by Johnny Cash

Box set by Johnny Cash
- Released: May 23, 2000
- Recorded: July 30, 1955 – June 1998
- Genres: Country; rockabilly; gospel
- Length: 130:32
- Labels: Legacy; Columbia; American

Johnny Cash chronology
16 Biggest Hits (1999)	Love, God, Murder (2000)	American III: Solitary Man (2000)

Box set
Review scores
Source	Rating
AllMusic	4/5 stars
Rolling Stone	4.5/5 stars

Love, God, Murder is a Johnny Cash compilation box set (and 84th overall release) released in 2000. It features three themed CDs of songs Cash chose from his catalog. Love features relationship songs, mostly written for June Carter Cash. God is a collection of Gospel and spiritual songs. Murder features another recurring topic of Cash's career, and perhaps his favorite subject, but one that he encouraged people "not to go out and do". Each album was also released separately on the same day. In 2004 Life, a fourth compilation was released.

Although the albums within the box set are compilations, they demonstrate Cash's lifelong affection for releasing concept albums. Examples of previous Cash theme albums include Bitter Tears: Ballads of the American Indian (1964), Sings the Ballads of the True West (1965), America: A 200-Year Salute in Story and Song (1972) and The Rambler (1977).

Each of the three discs contains liner notes by a celebrity. Love has liner notes by Cash's wife, June Carter Cash, U2's frontman Bono contributes liner notes for God, and Murder's liner notes are by film director Quentin Tarantino.

== Love ==
Love

Compilation album by Johnny Cash
- Released: May 23, 2000
- Recorded: April 2, 1956 – August 1996
- Genres: Country; rockabilly
- Length: 39:42
- Label: Legacy/Columbia

Love
Review scores
Source	Rating
AllMusic	4.5/5 stars

No.	Title	Writer(s)	Length
1.	"I Walk the Line"	Cash	2:46
2.	"Oh, What a Dream"	Cash	2:03
3.	"All Over Again"	Cash	2:07
4.	"Little at a Time"	Cash, Terry	1:57
5.	"My Old Faded Rose"	Cash, Cash	2:53
6.	"Happiness Is You"	Cash, Cash	2:57
7.	"Flesh and Blood"	Cash	2:40
8.	"I Tremble for You"	Cash, DeWitt	2:15
9.	"I Feel Better All Over"	Rogers, Smith	2:04
10.	"Cause I Love You"	Cash	1:47
11.	"Ballad of Barbara"	Cash	3:49
12.	"Ring of Fire"	Carter, Kilgore	2:39
13.	"My Shoes Keep Walking Back to You"	Ross, Wills	2:26
14.	"While I've Got It on My Mind"	Cash	2:21
15.	"I Still Miss Someone"	Cash, Cash	2:35
16.	"The One Rose (That's Left in My Heart)"	Lyon, McIntire	2:27

=== Love credits ===
- Johnny Cash – Arranger, Liner Notes, Adaptation, Compilation Producer
- June Carter Cash – Liner Notes
- John Jackson – Project Director
- Steven Berkowitz – Producer
- Chris Athens – Engineer
- Mark Wilder – Engineer
- Darcy Proper – Mastering
- Howard Fritzson – Art Direction
- Don Hunstein – Photography

== God ==
God

Compilation album by Johnny Cash
- Released: May 23, 2000
- Recorded: April 5, 1957 – Mar 24, 1994
- Genres: Country; gospel
- Length: 46:39
- Label: Legacy/Columbia

God
Review scores
Source	Rating
AllMusic	3.5/5 stars

Another feature of Cash's career is his affinity for another theme: gospel. God pulls from a vast catalog of spiritual songs that includes the albums Hymns by Johnny Cash (1959), Songs of Our Soil (1959), Hymns from the Heart (1962), Sings Precious Memories (1975), Believe in Him (1986) and My Mother's Hymn Book (2004).

No.	Title	Writer(s)	Length
1.	"What on Earth Will You Do (For Heaven's Sake)"	Cash	2:09
2.	"My God is Real"	Morris	2:01
3.	"It Was Jesus"	Cash	2:06
4.	"Why Me Lord?"	Kristofferson	2:22
5.	"The Greatest Cowboy of Them All"	Cash	3:58
6.	"Redemption"	Cash	3:04
7.	"Great Speckled Bird"	Carter, Smith	2:11
8.	"The Old Account"	Traditional	2:25
9.	"Swing Low, Sweet Chariot"	Traditional	1:53
10.	"When He Comes"	Cash	3:33
11.	"The Kneeling Drunkard's Plea"	Carter, Carter, Carter, Cash	2:33
12.	"Were You There (When They Crucified My Lord)"	Traditional	3:54
13.	"Man in White"	Cash	5:33
14.	"Belshazzar"	Cash	2:26
15.	"Oh, Bury Me Not (Introduction: A Cowboy's Prayer)"	Lomax, Lomax, Rogers, Spencer	3:55
16.	"Oh Come, Angel Band"	Cash	2:44

=== God credits ===
- Johnny Cash – Arranger, Liner Notes, Adaptation, Compilation Producer
- Bono – Liner Notes
- John Jackson – Project Director
- Steven Berkowitz – Producer
- Chris Athens – Engineer
- Mark Wilder – Engineer
- Darcy Proper – Mastering
- Howard Fritzson – Art Direction
- Don Hunstein – Photography

== Murder ==
Murder

Compilation album by Johnny Cash
- Released: May 23, 2000
- Recorded: Jul 30, 1955 – December 1993
- Genres: Country; rockabilly
- Length: 51:11
- Label: Legacy/Columbia

Murder
Review scores
Source	Rating
AllMusic	4.5/5 stars

No.	Title	Writer(s)	Length
1.	"Folsom Prison Blues"	Cash	2:52
2.	"Delia's Gone"	Silbersdorf, Toops	2:18
3.	"Mr. Garfield"	Elliott	4:39
4.	"Orleans Parish Prison"	Feller	2:30
5.	"When It's Springtime in Alaska (It's Forty Below)"	Franks, Horton	2:40
6.	"The Sound of Laughter"	Howard	2:38
7.	"Cocaine Blues"	Arnall	2:50
8.	"Hardin Wouldn't Run"	Cash	4:22
9.	"Long Black Veil"	Dill, Wilkin	3:07
10.	"Austin Prison"	Cash	2:10
11.	"Joe Bean"	Freeman, Pober	3:09
12.	"Going to Memphis"	Cash, Dew, Lomax	4:22
13.	"Don't Take Your Guns to Town"	Cash	3:05
14.	"Highway Patrolman"	Bruce Springsteen	5:22
15.	"Jacob Green"	Cash	3:06
16.	"The Wall"	Howard	2:10

=== Murder credits ===
- Johnny Cash – Producer, Liner Notes, Compilation Producer
- Quentin Tarantino – Liner Notes
- John Jackson – Project Director
- Steven Berkowitz – Producer
- Chris Athens – Engineer
- Mark Wilder – Engineer
- Darcy Proper – Mastering
- Mike Cimicata – Packaging Manager
- Howard Fritzson – Art Direction
- Don Hunstein – Photography
- Patti Matheny – A&R
- Tim Smith – A&R

== Life ==
Life

Compilation album by Johnny Cash
- Released: March 23, 2004
- Recorded: 1958 – June 30, 1988
- Genres: Country; folk
- Label: Legacy/Columbia

Johnny Cash chronology
Unearthed (2003)	Life (2004)	My Mother's Hymn Book (2004)

Life
Review scores
Source	Rating
AllMusic	4/5 stars

As a result of the success of the first three collections, in 2004, a fourth volume, Life, was released (his 90th overall release). It mostly features songs about social and economic struggle. All tracks were previously released with the exception of "I Can't Go on That Way", a previously unreleased recording from 1977.

No.	Title	Writer(s)	Length
1.	"Suppertime"	Ira Stanphill	2:51
2.	"Country Trash"	Johnny Cash	2:25
3.	"The Night Hank Williams Came to Town"	Braddock, Williams	3:22
4.	"Time Changes Everything"	Duncan	1:51
5.	"I Talk to Jesus Every Day"	Tubb	2:04
6.	"You're the Nearest Thing to Heaven"	Atkins, Cash, Johnson	2:40
7.	"I'm Ragged But I'm Right"	George Jones	2:37
8.	"These Are My People"	Johnny Cash	2:38
9.	"The Ballad of Ira Hayes"	Peter LaFarge	4:09
10.	"Oney"	Chestnut	3:08
11.	"Man in Black"	Johnny Cash	2:53
12.	"I'm Alright Now"	Hensley	2:41
13.	"Ragged Old Flag"	Johnny Cash	3:08
14.	"I Wish I Was Crazy Again"	McDill	2:44
15.	"Where Did We Go Right"	Loggins, Schlitz	2:58
16.	"Wanted Man" (live)	Johnny Cash, Bob Dylan	2:59
17.	"I Can't Go on That Way" (outtake from The Rambler [1977])	Johnny Cash	2:33
18.	"Lead Me Gently Home"	Thompson	1:59

=== Life credits ===
- Johnny Cash – Producer, Compilation Producer, Selection
- John Carter Cash – Executive Producer
- Lou Robin – Executive Producer
- Steven Berkowitz – Producer
- Andy Manganello – Mixing
- Joseph M. Palmaccio – Mastering
- Geoffrey Rice – Mixing Assistant
- Triana Dorazio – Packaging Manager
- Howard Fritzson – Art Direction
- David Gahr – Photography
- Don Hunstein – Cover Photo

== Charts ==
Chart performance for Love, God, Murder
Chart (2000)	Peak position
US Top Country Albums (Billboard)	67
