= Katharine Purvis =

Katharine Elinda Nash Purvis
- Born: Katharine Elinda Nash; May 19, 1842; Towanda, Pennsylvania, United States
- Died: October 23, 1907 (aged 65); Williamsport, Pennsylvania, United States
- Occupation(s): Educator, political activist, orator, and hymn lyricist
- Years active: 1860-1907
- Known for: Lyricist of When the Saints Are Marching In and Walk Beside Me
- Parent: Rev. Charles Nash

Katharine Elinda Nash Purvis (May 19, 1842 – October 23, 1907) was an educator, political activist, orator, and hymn lyricist in the United States during the late nineteenth and early twentieth centuries. She is best known as the lyricist for When the Saints Are Marching In and Walk Beside Me, which were reproduced more than five million times during the publication of seventy-five hymnals by the early 1900s.

== Early life ==
Born in Towanda, Pennsylvania on May 19, 1842, Katharine E. Nash was a daughter of the Rev. Charles Nash, a Methodist minister. She was an 1860 seminary graduate.

== Career ==
She began her professional life as a music teacher at the seminary of a Methodist Episcopal Church in Williamsport, Pennsylvania.

In 1896, the hymn When the Saints Are Marching In was published, with music by James Milton Black. Later, the song was altered somewhat and published in 1927 as the well known When The Saints Go Marching In.

On March 20, 1898, Purvis was one of the featured speakers at a gathering of members of the Woman's Christian Temperance Union (WCTU) and the Prohibition Club at the Williamsport Courthouse in Williamsport, Pennsylvania. On June 15 of that same year, Purvis delivered an address at the semi-centennial reunion of the Belles Lettres, Gamma Epsilon and the Tripatite literary societies as part of the semi-centennial jubilee celebration of the Williamsport Dickinson Seminary (now Lycoming College) in Williamsport. An active member of the WCTU, she served on the organization's Resolutions Committee in 1898.

== Death ==
Purvis died at the age of sixty-five in Williamsport on October 23, 1907.
