= American IV: The Man Comes Around =

2002 studio album by Johnny Cash

Studio album by Johnny Cash
- Released: November 5, 2002
- Recorded: 2002
- Studio: American Recording Studios
- Genre: Country
- Length: 51:55
- Labels: American Recordings; Universal
- Producers: Rick Rubin; John Carter Cash

Johnny Cash chronology
Johnny Cash at Madison Square Garden (2002)	American IV: The Man Comes Around (2002)	Unearthed (2003)

American series chronology
American III: Solitary Man (2000)	American IV: The Man Comes Around (2002)	Unearthed (2003)

Singles from American IV: The Man Comes Around
- 1. "Personal Jesus" Released: September 30, 2002; 2. "Hurt" Released: February 10, 2003

Professional ratings
Aggregate scores
Source	Rating
Metacritic	70/100
Review scores
Source	Rating
AllMusic	2.5/5 stars
Entertainment Weekly	A−
The Guardian	4/5 stars
Los Angeles Times	3.5/4 stars
Mojo	4.5/5 stars
Pitchfork	6.9/10
Robert Christgau	A−
Rolling Stone	3/5 stars
Sputnikmusic	4.5/5 stars
Uncut	4/5 stars
The Rolling Stone Album Guide	3.5/5 stars

American IV: The Man Comes Around is the 67th studio album by American country musician Johnny Cash, and the last to be released during his lifetime. It was released on November 5, 2002, through American and Universal Records. It is the fourth entry in Cash's American series of albums, considered by many critics to be his finest work towards the end of his life. The album was also included in the book 1001 Albums You Must Hear Before You Die.

== Background ==
The majority of songs are covers which Cash performs in his own sparse style, with help from producer Rick Rubin. For instance, for the song "Personal Jesus", Rubin asked Red Hot Chili Peppers guitarist John Frusciante to re-work an acoustic version of Martin Gore's song, which featured a simple acoustic riff that stripped down the song to a blues style. He receives backing vocal assistance from various artists, including Fiona Apple, Nick Cave, and Don Henley.

American IV was the final album Johnny Cash released during his lifetime, though the Unearthed box set was compiled prior to his death, with Cash choosing the tracks and writing liner notes. American IV: The Man Comes Around was Cash's first non-compilation album to go gold in thirty years. Additionally, the album won "Album of the Year" award at the 2003 CMA Awards. It was certified gold on March 24, 2003, and platinum on November 21, 2003, by the Recording Industry Association of America, the first non-compilation album of Cash's to do so since the early 1970s.

The video for "Hurt," a song written by Trent Reznor of Nine Inch Nails and originally released in 1994, was nominated in seven categories at the 2003 MTV Video Music Awards and won the award for Best Cinematography. In 2003, mere days before his 71st birthday, Cash won a Grammy for "Give My Love to Rose", a song Cash had originally recorded in the late 1950s. Cash was also nominated that year for Best Country Collaboration with Vocals for his "Bridge over Troubled Water" cover with Fiona Apple. The music video for "Hurt" also won the award for Best Short Form Video in 2004.

Nine Inch Nails frontman Trent Reznor admitted that he was initially "flattered" but worried that "the idea of Cash covering 'Hurt' sounded a bit gimmicky," but when he heard the song and saw the video for the first time, Reznor said he was deeply moved and found Cash's cover beautiful and meaningful, going as far as to say "that song isn't mine anymore."

Graeme Thomson, in The Resurrection of Johnny Cash: Hurt, Redemption, and American Recordings, has discussed concern about Cash's health during the recording. Cash was suffering from multiple health problems and had lost most of his vision, with recording sessions interrupted by hospital stays. Thomson quotes singer Will Oldham: "We should turn and switch off the tape when our listening energy would be better spent helping a living songwriter/performer."

=== Previous recordings ===
Six songs featured on the album had previously been recorded by Cash.

- "Give My Love to Rose" was previously recorded by Cash for his 1960 album Sings Hank Williams.
- "Sam Hall" and "Streets of Laredo" were previously recorded by Cash for his 1965 album Johnny Cash Sings the Ballads of the True West.
- "Danny Boy" was previously recorded by Cash for his 1965 album Orange Blossom Special.
- "I'm So Lonesome I Could Cry" was previously recorded by Cash for his 1960 album Now, There Was a Song!
- "Tear Stained Letter" was previously recorded by Cash for his 1972 album A Thing Called Love.

== Track listing ==
Original double LP record release

Side A
No.	Title	Writer(s)	Length
1.	"The Man Comes Around"	Johnny Cash	4:26
2.	"Hurt"	Trent Reznor	3:38
3.	"Give My Love to Rose"	Johnny Cash	3:28
4.	"Bridge Over Troubled Water" (with Fiona Apple)	Paul Simon	3:55

Side B
No.	Title	Writer(s)	Length
1.	"I Hung My Head"	Sting	3:53
2.	"First Time Ever I Saw Your Face"	Ewan MacColl	3:52
3.	"Personal Jesus"	Martin Gore	3:20
4.	"In My Life"	Lennon–McCartney	2:57

Side C
No.	Title	Writer(s)	Length
1.	"Sam Hall"	Tex Ritter	2:40
2.	"Danny Boy"	Frederic Weatherly	3:19
3.	"Desperado" (with Don Henley)	Glenn Frey/Don Henley	3:13
4.	"I'm So Lonesome I Could Cry" (duet with Nick Cave)	Hank Williams	3:03
5.	"Streets of Laredo"	Traditional	3:33

Side D
No.	Title	Writer(s)	Length
1.	"Wichita Lineman"	Jimmy Webb	3:03
2.	"Big Iron"	Marty Robbins	3:52
3.	"Tear Stained Letter"	Johnny Cash	3:41
4.	"We'll Meet Again" (with The Whole Cash Gang)	Hughie Charles/Ross Parker	2:58

CD release, 2014 LP record reissue
No.	Title	Writer(s)	Length
1.	"The Man Comes Around"	Johnny Cash	4:26
2.	"Hurt"	Trent Reznor	3:38
3.	"Give My Love to Rose"	Johnny Cash	3:28
4.	"Bridge Over Troubled Water" (with Fiona Apple)	Paul Simon	3:55
5.	"I Hung My Head"	Sting	3:53
6.	"The First Time Ever I Saw Your Face"	Ewan MacColl	3:52
7.	"Personal Jesus"	Martin Gore	3:20
8.	"In My Life"	Lennon–McCartney	2:57
9.	"Sam Hall"	Tex Ritter	2:40
10.	"Danny Boy"	Frederic Weatherly	3:19
11.	"Desperado" (with Don Henley)	Glenn Frey/Don Henley	3:13
12.	"I'm So Lonesome I Could Cry" (duet with Nick Cave)	Hank Williams	3:03
13.	"Tear Stained Letter"	Johnny Cash	3:41
14.	"Streets of Laredo"	Traditional	3:33
15.	"We'll Meet Again" (with The Whole Cash Gang)	Hughie Charles/Ross Parker	2:58

The original double LP release features a different track order than the 2014 LP release as well as two additional songs: "Wichita Lineman", which was released on the compilation album Lost Highway: Lost & Found Volume 1, and "Big Iron", which was later released on Unearthed. The version of "Wichita Lineman" differs from the version that appears on the Unearthed collection.

== Personnel ==
- Johnny Cash – vocals, acoustic guitar, electric guitar, arranger, adaptation
- Don Henley – drums, keyboards, vocals (11)
- Fiona Apple – vocals (4)
- Nick Cave – vocals (12)
- Mike Campbell, John Frusciante, Randy Scruggs – acoustic guitar, electric guitar
- Thom Bresh, Jeff Hanna, Kerry Marx, Marty Stuart – acoustic guitar
- Smokey Hormel – acoustic guitar, slide guitar, electric guitar
- Jack Clement – Dobro
- Joey Waronker – drums
- David R. Ferguson – ukulele (9), engineer, mixing
- Laura Cash – fiddle, production assistant
- Terry Harrington – clarinet
- Benmont Tench – organ, piano, harmonium, keyboards, Mellotron, vibraphone, pipe organ, Wurlitzer electric piano
- Roger Manning – piano, tack piano, harmonium, Mellotron, Chamberlin, orchestra bells
- Billy Preston – piano, keyboards (7, 13)
- Rick Rubin – producer
- John Carter Cash – producer, engineer
- Thom Russo, Andrew Scheps, Chuck Turner – engineers
- Vladimir Meller – mastering
- Christine Cano – art direction, design
- Martyn Atkins – photography
- Lindsay Chase – production coordination
- Dwight Hume, Jimmy Tittle – production assistants

== Charts ==
Album - Billboard (United States)

=== Weekly charts ===
Chart (2002–04)	Peak position
US Billboard 200	22
US Top Country Albums (Billboard)	2
Austrian Albums (Ö3 Austria)	25
Canadian Albums (Billboard)	28
Danish Albums (Hitlisten)	19
Dutch Albums (Album Top 100)	59
Finnish Albums (Suomen virallinen lista)	17
French Albums (SNEP)	137
German Albums (Offizielle Top 100)	18
Norwegian Albums (VG-lista)	4
Scottish Albums (Official Charts)	31
Swedish Albums (Sverigetopplistan)	21
Swiss Albums (Schweizer Hitparade)	40
UK Albums (Official Charts)	40
UK Country Albums (Official Charts)	1

=== Year-end charts ===
Chart (2002)	Position
Canadian Country Albums (Nielsen SoundScan)	62
Chart (2003)	Position
US Billboard 200	94
US Top Country Albums (Billboard)	11
Chart (2004)	Position
US Top Country Albums (Billboard)	31

== Certifications ==
Region	Certification	Certified units/sales
Canada (Music Canada)	Platinum	100,000^{^}
Germany (BVMI)	Platinum	300,000^{^}
New Zealand (RMNZ)	Gold	7,500^{‡}
Sweden (GLF)	Gold	30,000^{^}
United Kingdom (BPI)	Platinum	300,000^{*}
United States (RIAA)	Platinum	1,600,000
Summaries
Europe (IFPI)	Platinum	1,000,000^{*}
^{*} Sales figures based on certification alone.^{^} Shipments figures based on certification alone.^{‡} Sales+streaming figures based on certification alone.
