= Strawberry Cake (song) =

Song by Johnny Cash

Single by Johnny Cash

from the album Strawberry Cake
- B-side: "I Got Stripes"
- Released: 1976
- Genre: Country
- Label: Columbia 3-10279
- Songwriter: J. R. Cash
- Producer: Charlie Bragg

Johnny Cash singles chronology
"Texas 1947" (1975)	"Strawberry Cake" (1976)	"One Piece at a Time" (1976)

Audio
- "Strawberry Cake" (live) on YouTube

"Strawberry Cake" is a song written and originally recorded by Johnny Cash for his 1976 live album Strawberry Cake.

Released in a live version as the first and only single from the album, the song reached number 54 on U.S. Billboard's country chart for the week of March 13, 1976. The B-side contained a live version of "I Got Stripes" from the same album.

== Content ==
It is a story song.

In [this song], a former farm worker who has now migrated to the city steals cake from the decadent Plaza Hotel in New York City in frustration over his hunger and dislocation. Cash's lyrics describe the man's time as a strawberry picker in California as "hard work with no future"[...] The lyrics criticize the opulence of the hotel by juxtaposing it with the man's starvation, highlighted by the irony that the man cannot afford to buy the very food that he himself harvested.

— Leigh H. Edwards. Johnny Cash and the Paradox of American Identity

Leigh H. Edwards adds that Cash, too, "had worked briefly as a strawberry picker in Arkansas after graduating high school".

== Critical response ==
In the opinion of Greg Laurie, the author of the book Johnny Cash: The Redemption of an American Icon, "Cash's late 1970s output—'The Last Gunfighter Ballad', 'Look at Them Beans', 'Strawberry Cake', and 'The Rambler'—was stale and out of touch."

== Track listing ==
7" single (Columbia 3-10279, 1976)
No.	Title	Writer(s)	Length
1.	"Strawberry Cake"	J. R. Cash	3:04
2.	"I Got Stripes"	J. R. Cash, C. Williams	2:00

== Charts ==
Chart (1976)	Peak position
US Hot Country Songs (Billboard)	54
