= Johnny Cash Boyhood Home =

Historic house in Arkansas, United States

- Farm No. 266—Johnny Cash Boyhood Home
- U.S. National Register of Historic Places
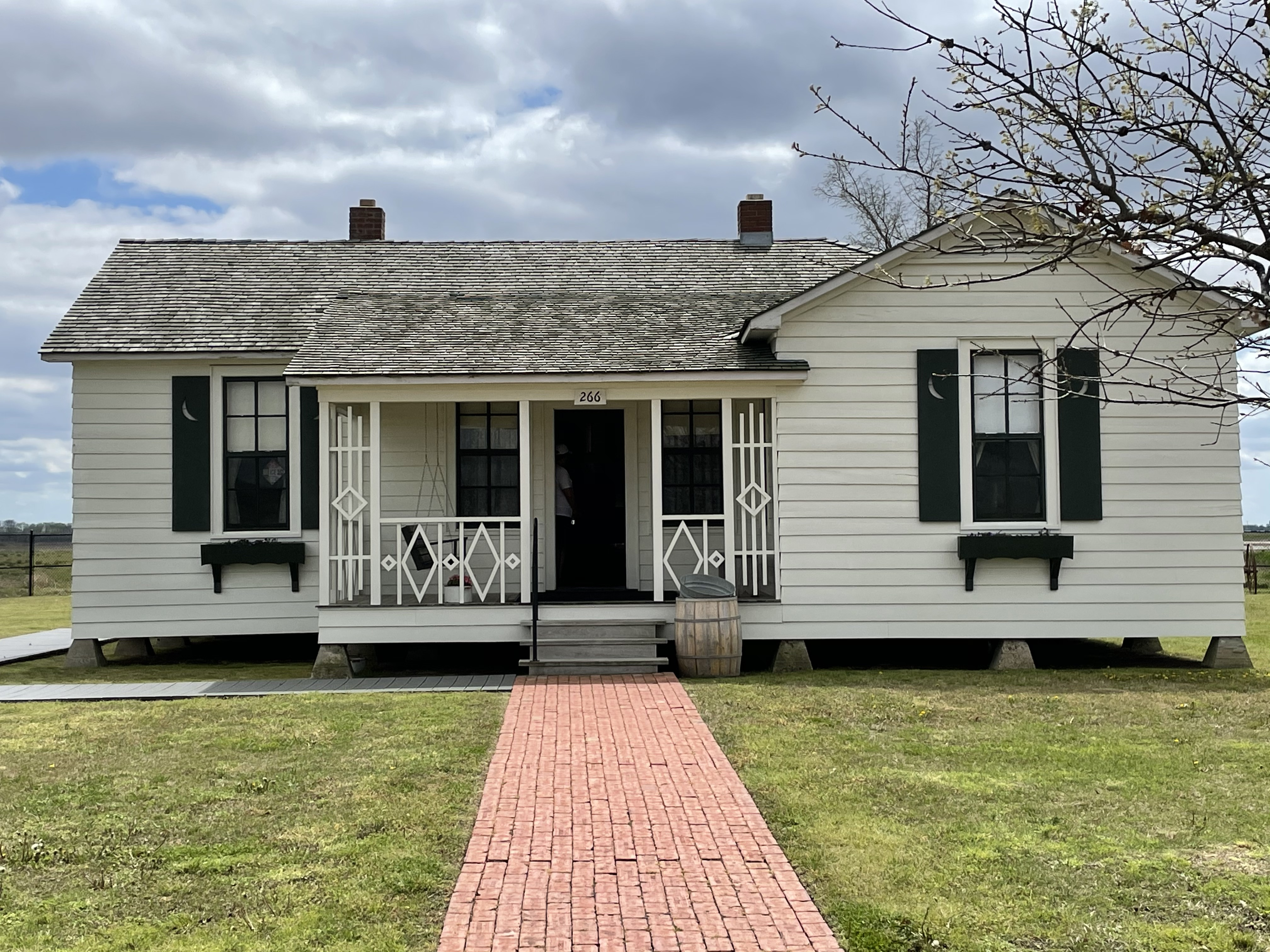

- Location within Arkansas Location within the United States
- Location: 4791 W Cty. Rd. 924, near Dyess, Arkansas
- Coordinates: 35.597393°N 90.244989°W
- Area: less than one acre
- Built: 1934
- NRHP reference No.: 100002000
- Added to NRHP: May 2, 2018

Farm No. 266—Johnny Cash Boyhood Home was the home of singer-songwriter Johnny Cash from 1935 to 1950. Cash moved with his family to a rural community in Mississippi County, Arkansas. The farm house was built in 1934 in a government project to help boost the economy. The Cash family joined the community in March 1935. Ray and Carrie Cash moved to Arkansas when they took an offer to farm government land for poor and impoverished farmers. The Cash family went through many hardships while living in the farm house by floods and losing one of their children, Jack Cash. Growing up picking cotton and working on the farm influenced some of Johnny Cash's songs in the future, one of them being "Pickin' Time." In 2018, the home was listed on the National Register of Historic Places.

== History ==
In March 1935, when American musician Johnny Cash was three years old, the family settled in Dyess, Arkansas, a New Deal colony of the Franklin Roosevelt administration. Dyess Colony was founded in Mississippi county in 1934 to give poor families a chance to work land that they had a chance to own. The colony was named after William Reynolds Dyess, a Mississippi native, and the first Arkansas WPA administrator. Dyess gave the idea of supplying farms to families in poverty to Harry Hopkins, and then named the first "Colonization Project No 1." 16,000 acres in Mississippi County were given to this project for 500 different families to come farm on. Families started arriving in October 1934. The Cash family settled in March 1935 on 20 acres. The house given to the Cash family is one of few left standing in the Dyess Colony.

J.R., as Cash was known as a child, started working in his father's cotton fields at the age of five, singing along with his family while working. He lived there until he graduated from high school in 1950. All families in Dyess colony depended on cotton. None were sharecroppers so the idea of one day purchasing their farms from the government was real. The government eventually stopped funding the scheme, but the Cash family continued farming at the property.

Arkansas State University acquired the home in 2011, and the university's Heritage Sites Office operates it as a small museum, "Historic Dyess Colony: Johnny Cash Boyhood Home", as of 2022. It was listed on the National Register of Historic Places in 2018.

== Childhood of Johnny Cash ==
Johnny Cash was born to Ray, and Carrie Cash on February 26, 1932. J.R was the fourth born of seven children to the Cash family. J.R was three years old when the family packed up and moved to their new home, Farm No. 266. The Great Depression was a tragedy at this time, but along with the Great Depression came floods and natural disasters. In 1937 the Mississippi and Ohio Rivers flooded. The flood was so bad on the Cash family, they had to evacuate. Everyone but Ray Cash left to go to Kingsland; until it was safe to return. Along with natural disasters and the Great Depression, the Cash family experienced a horrific personal tragedy when on May 20, 1944, Johnny's older brother, 14-year-old Jack Cash, was mortally wounded when he fell into a table saw at work; he would die in the hospital a week later.

== Incorporating the farm house into his music ==
Johnny Cash used his experiences growing up at the farm house in many of his songs. One important song that was inspired from the farm house is, "Pickin' Time".

I got cotton in the bottom land It's up and growin' and I got a good stand My good wife and them kids of mine Gonna get new shoes, come pickin' time

Get new shoes come pickin' time

Ev'ry night when I go to bed I thank the Lord that my kids are fed They live on beans eight days and nine But I get 'em fat come pickin' time Get 'em fat come come pickin' time

The family farm was flooded on at least two occasions, which inspired his song "Five Feet High and Rising".

== Gallery ==
Three images of the Cash home
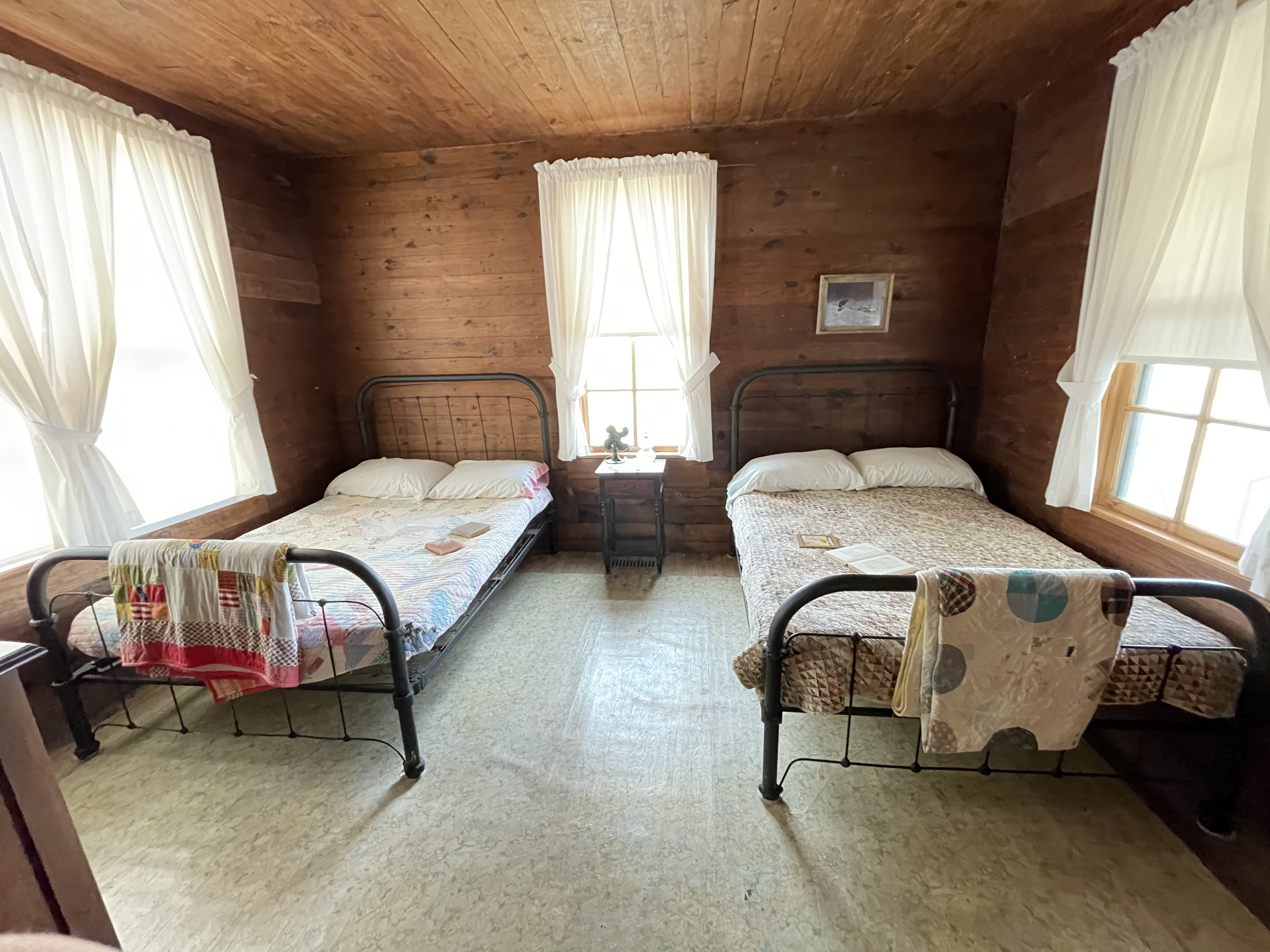
The bedroom Johnny Cash shared with his three brothers

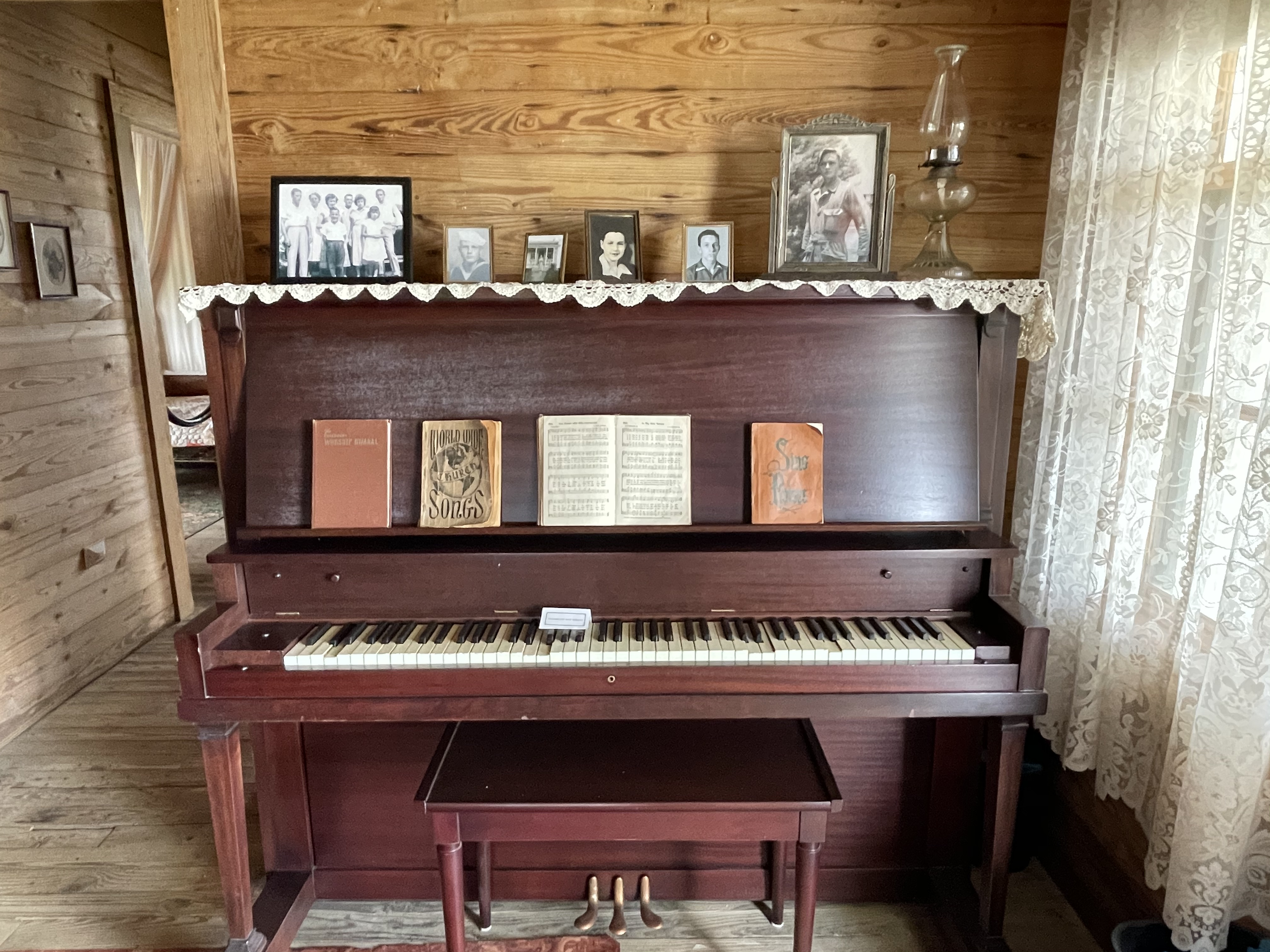
Family piano in the living room

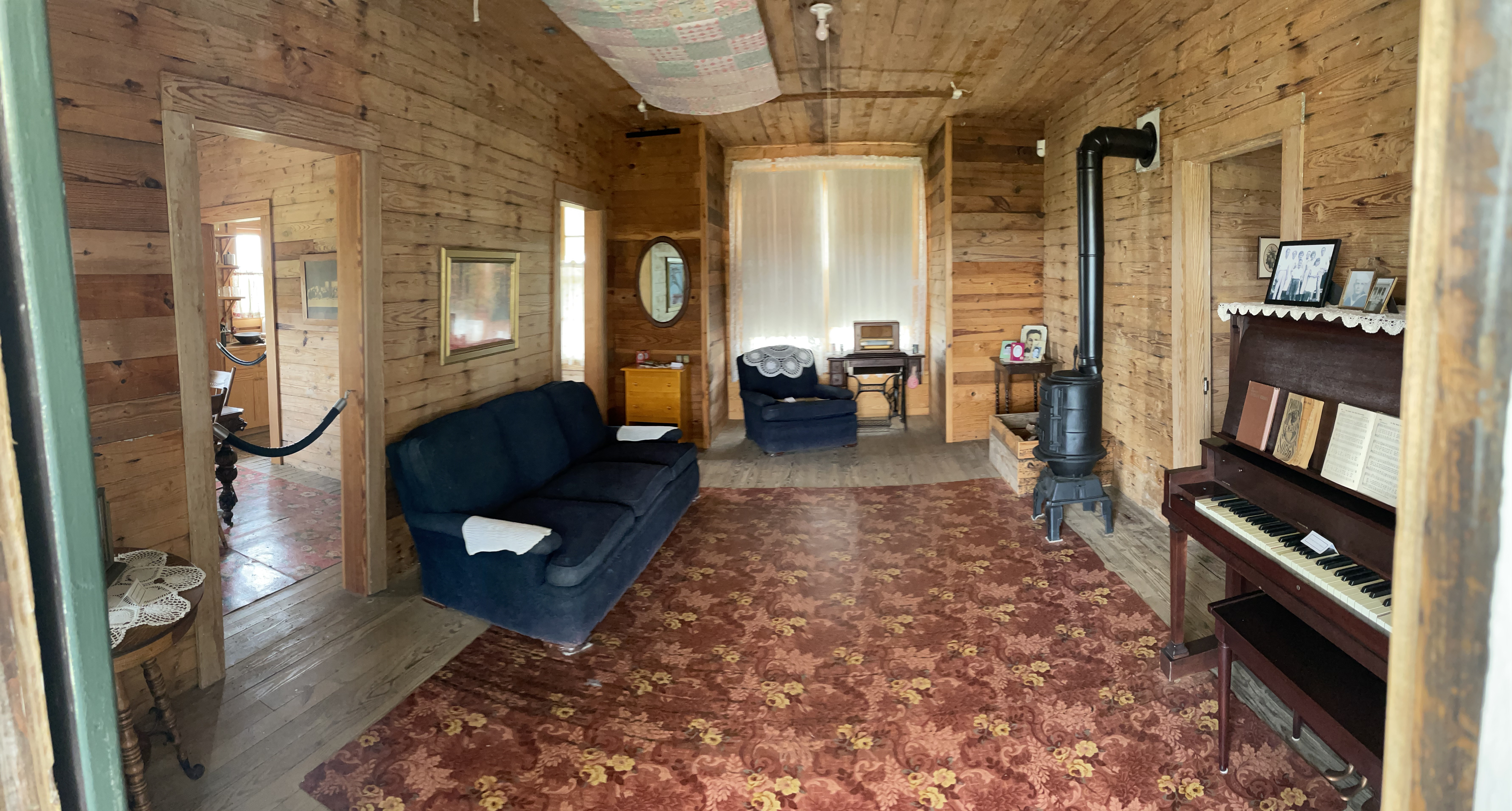
Living room

== See also ==
- House of Cash
- Johnny Cash Museum
- Carter Family Fold
- National Register of Historic Places listings in Mississippi County, Arkansas
