= The Man Comes Around =

Song by Johnny Cash

from the album American IV: The Man Comes Around
- Released: May 24, 2002
- Genre: Folk; alternative country; gospel
- Length: 4:26
- Label: American Recordings; Universal
- Songwriter: Johnny Cash
- Producers: Rick Rubin; John Carter Cash

Johnny Cash singles chronology
| "Rusty Cage" (1996) | "The Man Comes Around" (2002) | "Personal Jesus" (2002) |

"The Man Comes Around" is the title track from Johnny Cash's American IV: The Man Comes Around, released in 2002. It was written several years prior to the release of the album; however, Cash updated it for the album. It is one of the last songs Cash wrote before his death. Both sung and spoken, the song makes numerous Biblical references, especially to the Book of Revelation.

== Symbols and references in the lyrics ==
There are numerous biblical references in the lyrics. A spoken portion from Revelation 6:1–2 in the King James Version introduces the song. The passage describes the coming of the Four Horsemen of the Apocalypse, each heralded by one of the "four beasts" first mentioned in Revelation 4:6–9. The musical portion then begins with Cash reciting that "the man" (Jesus Christ) will one day come to pass judgment. The chorus indicates that these events will be accompanied by trumpets (as in Revelation 8, 9, 11), pipers (Rev. 18:22), and "one hundred million angels singing". The voice of the Lord in Revelation is often likened to the sound of a loud trumpet (Revelation 1:10; 4:1; and 8:13). Revelation 5:11 states that John saw that there are millions of angels in Heaven.

The song also alludes to the Parable of the Ten Virgins from the Gospel of Matthew (25:1–13) with the lyrics "The virgins are all trimming their wicks," a reference to the virgins' preparation of the Second Coming of Christ. The phrase, "It's hard for thee to kick against the pricks" cites Acts 26:14, where Paul the Apostle describes meeting Jesus while traveling to Damascus. It is a reference to a Greek proverb where a kicking ox only injures himself by attempting to kick against a goad, intended to represent the futility of resisting the Lord.

Elsewhere, the song mentions the wise men who bow before the Lord's throne, and cast their "golden crowns" at the feet of God. Revelation 4 refers to elders who worship the Lord and "lay their crowns" before Him (Revelation 4:10). "Alpha and Omega" refers to God himself (Rev. 1:8, 11; 21:6, 22:13), but also to the cries of the newborn and the dying. "Whoever is unjust… etc" is a quote from Revelation 22:11.

== Music ==
The arrangement of the song is sparse (although not so much as in some of Cash's later recordings, such as "God's Gonna Cut You Down"); two guitars, piano (played in the bass register), and an electric organ.

== History ==
Of the album's fifteen tracks, only three were written by Cash, with "The Man Comes Around" the sole song specifically penned for it, and the only song Cash wrote in its entirety.

The song was inspired by a dream Cash had about Queen Elizabeth II in which the Queen compared Cash to "a thorn tree in a whirlwind." Haunted by the dream, Cash became curious if the phrase was a biblical reference and eventually found a similar phrase in the Book of Job.

An alternative "early take" of the song appears on the Unearthed box set (2003) and The Legend of Johnny Cash (2005). The "Legend" version omits the spoken word intro and outro.

== Legacy ==
Upon Cash's passing in 2003, Emmylou Harris remembered the song as "astounding". The song was listed as the 296th best song of the 2000s by Pitchfork. In 2025, the British band Pulp released a cover of the song as a single.

== Certifications ==
| Region | Certification | Certified units/sales |
|---|---|---|
| United Kingdom (BPI) | Silver | 200,000^{‡} |
^{‡} Sales+streaming figures based on certification alone.

== In popular culture ==
- The song was used during the opening credits of the 2004 remake of Dawn of the Dead.
- The song is used in the last episode of the first season of Terminator: The Sarah Connor Chronicles.
- The song was used in the ending sequence for the final episode of the 2008 miniseries Generation Kill.
- The song was used in the live-action debut trailer for the 2011 video game Operation Flashpoint: Red River.
- The song was used in the trailer and soundtrack for the 2012 film Killing Them Softly.
- The song is used over a montage of Raymond Reddington investigating and executing members of an attack against him in the eleventh episode of the first season of NBC's The Blacklist.
- The song was used during the ending credits of the movie Logan.
- The song is used in the wedding scene of the 2008 film My Best Friend's Girl.
- The song was used during the end credits of the 2003 film The Hunted, which also featured an opening credits voiceover by Cash himself.
- The song was used for the final sequence in the ninth episode of the first season of TNT's continuation of Dallas.
- The song was used in the opening sequence on season 10 episode 10 of CSI: Crime Scene Investigation "Better Off Dead".
- The song is used in the opening credits on Season 3 Episode 16 of Criminal Minds "Elephant's Memory".
- The song was used in the trailer and soundtrack for the 2022 film Father Stu.
- A parody version of the song was featured in the 2024 TV special South Park: The End of Obesity referencing the 2004 remake of Dawn of the Dead sung by Trey Parker.
- The song was used in the second trailer of the 2024 Sony's Spider-Man Universe (SSU) film Kraven the Hunter.
- The song was sung at the end of episode 4 of Young Sherlock.
