= Sold Out of Flagpoles =

Song by Johnny Cash

Single by Johnny Cash and The Tennessee Three

from the album One Piece at a Time
- B-side: "Mountain Lady"
- Released: 1976
- Genre: Country
- Label: Columbia 3-10381
- Songwriter: Johnny Cash
- Producers: Charlie Bragg, Don Davis

Johnny Cash and The Tennessee Three singles chronology
"One Piece at a Time" (1976)	"Sold Out of Flagpoles" (1976)	"It's All Over" (1976)

Audio
- "Sold Out of Flagpoles" on YouTube

"Sold Out of Flagpoles" is a song written and originally recorded by Johnny Cash for his 1976 studio album One Piece at a Time.

Released as the second and last single from the album, the song reached number 29 on U.S. Billboard's country chart for the week of August 28, 1976. The B-side contained the song "Mountain Lady" from the same album.

== Content ==
It is a story song.

== Track listing ==
7" single (Columbia 3-10381, 1976)
No.	Title	Writer(s)	Length
1.	"Sold Out of Flagpoles"	J. R. Cash	2:36
2.	"Mountain Lady"	J. R. Cash	2:43

== Charts ==
Chart (1976)	Peak position
US Hot Country Songs (Billboard)	29
