= Look at Them Beans (song) =

Song by Johnny Cash

"Papa's Dream"

Single by Joe Tex

from the album Joe Tex Spills the Beans
- B-side: "I'm Comin' Home"
- Released: 1971
- Genre: R&B
- Label: Dial D-1003
- Songwriter: Joe Tex

"Look at Them Beans"

Single by Johnny Cash

from the album Look at Them Beans
- B-side: "All Around Cowboy"
- Released: 1975
- Genre: Country
- Label: Columbia 3-10177
- Songwriter: Joe Tex
- Producer: Don Davis

Johnny Cash singles chronology
"My Old Kentucky Home (Turpentine and Dandelion Wine)" (1975)	"Look at Them Beans" (1975)	"Texas 1947" (1975)

Audio
- "Look at Them Beans" on YouTube

"Look at Them Beans" is a song written and recorded under the title "Papa's Dream" by Joe Tex. Johnny Cash recorded and released it as a single in 1975 and subsequently included on that year's album Look at Them Beans.

== Johnny Cash version ==
=== Track listing ===
7" single (Columbia 3-10177, 1975)
No.	Title	Writer(s)	Length
1.	"Look at Them Beans"	J. Tex	2:56
2.	"All Around Cowboy"	L. Pollard, J. Routh	2:44

=== Charts ===
Chart (1975)	Peak position
US Hot Country Songs (Billboard)	17
