= One Piece at a Time =

Single by Johnny Cash

from the album One Piece at a Time
- B-side: "Go On Blues"
- Released: March 1976
- Genre: Country; rockabilly; novelty
- Length: 4:04
- Label: Columbia
- Songwriter: Wayne Kemp
- Producers: Charlie Bragg, Don Davis

Johnny Cash singles chronology
"Strawberry Cake" (1976)	"One Piece at a Time" (1976)	"Sold Out of Flagpoles" (1976)

"One Piece at a Time" is a country novelty song written by Wayne Kemp and recorded by Johnny Cash and the Tennessee Three in 1976. It was the last song performed by Cash to reach No. 1 on the Billboard Hot Country Singles chart and the last of Cash's songs to reach the Billboard Hot 100, on which it peaked at No. 29.

== Content ==
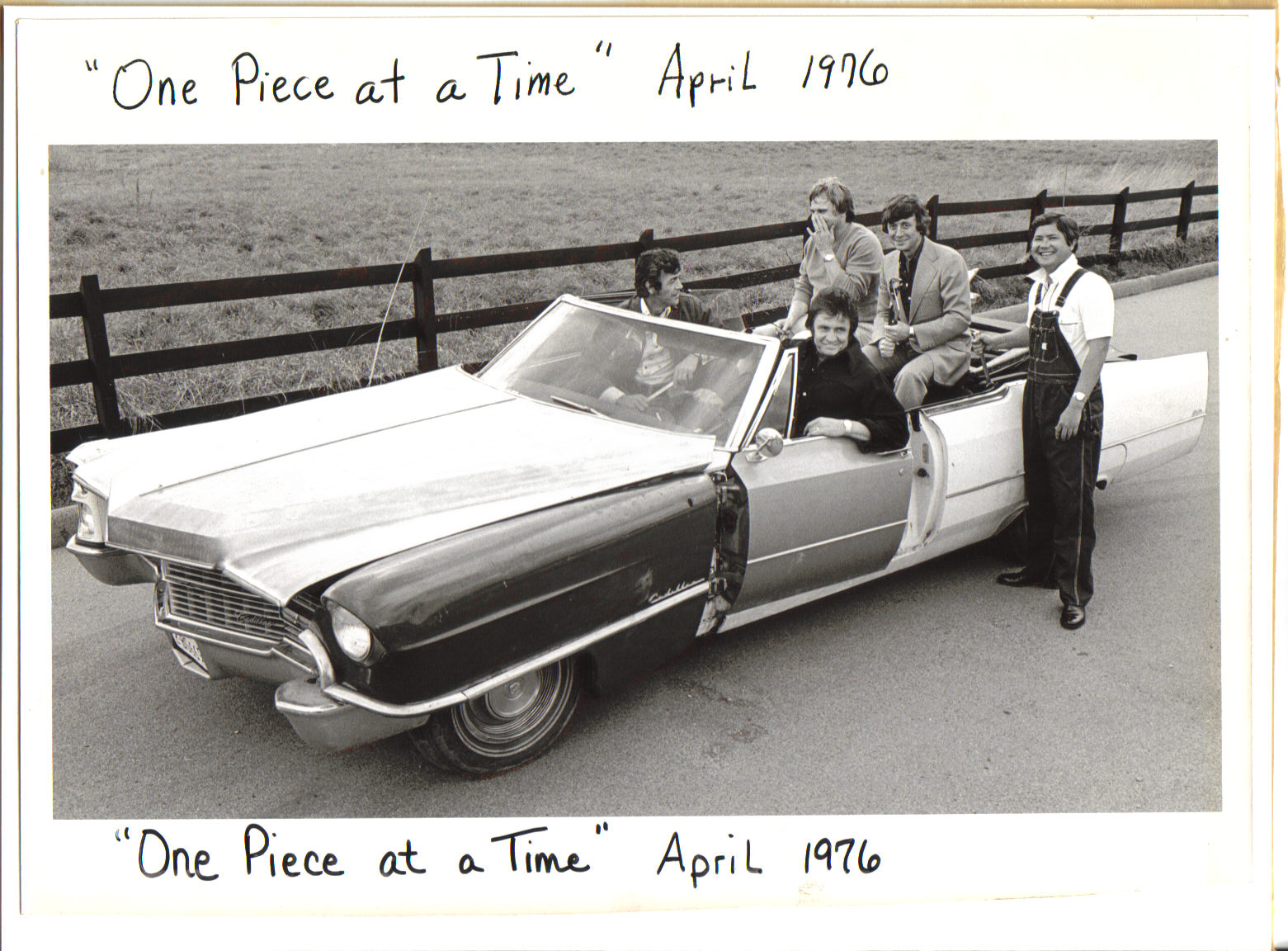
Johnny Cash's "One Piece at a Time" Cadillac. Cash is in the driver's seat and Bruce Fitzpatrick is standing at the far right.

The narrator leaves his home in Kentucky in 1949 to pursue work at General Motors in Detroit, Michigan, installing wheels on Cadillacs, watching each one roll by day after day on the assembly line, knowingly lamenting that he will never be able to afford one of his own.

Beginning almost immediately, the narrator and a co-worker decide to "steal" a Cadillac by way of using their assembly line jobs to obtain the parts via salami slicing. He takes the small parts home hidden in his unusually large lunch box; larger parts are smuggled out in his co-worker's motorhome.

The process of accumulating all the necessary parts turns out to take at least 25 years (the newest part mentioned, the engine, is from 1973), but once they have what they think is a complete car, they attempt to assemble the pieces. Because automakers inevitably make numerous changes to their models, designs and parts over the course of a quarter-century, the result was a hodgepodge of parts from different years and models that did not fit together well (the bolt holes disappear when attempting to fit the 1973 engine with a 1953 transmission, there was only one right headlight and two left headlights, and only one tail fin).

Despite these problems, the narrator and his co-worker get the car in proper working condition. The singer's wife is skeptical of the outcome, but wants a ride in it anyway. Townspeople begin laughing at the narrator's unique car as he takes it to have it registered. However, the folks at the courthouse were not as pleased – it took the "whole staff" to complete the vehicle title, which ended up weighing 60 pounds (27 kg).

The song ends with a CB radio conversation between the narrator and a truck driver inquiring about the "psychobilly Cadillac", to which the singer replies, "you might say I went right up to the factory and picked it up; it's cheaper that way". When asked what model it is, the narrator describes it as model years 1949 up to 1970 as the song fades out.

The song is in a moderate tempo in the key of F major, with a main chord pattern of F-B♭-C_{7}-F. The verses are done in a talking blues style; Cash had used a similar spoken-word format and chord progression in his earlier hit "A Boy Named Sue."

== Legacy ==
The name of the rockabilly subgenre psychobilly came from a lyric in "One Piece at a Time".

Bruce Fitzpatrick, owner of Abernathy Auto Parts and Hilltop Auto Salvage in Nashville, Tennessee, was asked by the promoters of the song to build the vehicle for international promotion. Fitzpatrick had all the models of Cadillacs mentioned in the song when it was released, and built a car using the song as a model. It took about eight to ten days, according to Fitzpatrick. The result was presented to Cash in April 1976. It was parked outside the House of Cash in Hendersonville, Tennessee, until someone could find a place to store it. After the House of Cash closed, Fitzpatrick retrieved the '49–'70 Cadillac with a wrecker, brought it back to Abernathy Auto Parts and Hilltop Auto Salvage in Nashville, Tennessee, and crushed it. "People from all over the world call me about the patchwork Cadillac," Fitzpatrick later said. "But it wasn't that big of a deal when we built it. Nashville wasn't even that big then. We built the car for fun. I never got paid for it."

The song was covered by Chicago rock band Tub Ring for the 2001 Johnny Cash tribute album, Cash from Chaos.

The psychobilly Cadillac from the "One Piece at a Time" video is at the Storytellers museum in Bon Aqua, Tennessee. This is a different car from the one made by Bruce Fitzpatrick. This car was made at the behest of Bill Patch of Welch, Oklahoma, and constructed by Leland Mayfield, Harley Malone, Eldon McCoy and Don. P. Chenoweth.

An attempt at building a vehicle "one piece at a time" was completed successfully over a five-year period by a Chinese motorcycle assembly line worker in Chongqing. Although the motorcycle was fully operational, the worker's plan was foiled when no registration could be found for it; the worker was charged with theft of the parts, fined, and ordered to return the parts to the factory where he worked.

== Charts ==
=== Weekly charts ===
Chart (1976)	Peak position
US Hot Country Songs (Billboard)	1
US Billboard Hot 100	29
US Billboard Easy Listening	6
Canada RPM Country Tracks	1
Canada RPM Top Singles	40
Canada RPM Adult Contemporary	1
UK Singles Chart	32

=== Year-end charts ===
Chart (1976)	Position
US Hot Country Songs (Billboard)	9
