= American III: Solitary Man =

Studio album by Johnny Cash
- Released: October 17, 2000
- Recorded: 2000
- Studio: Cash Cabin Studio (Hendersonville, Tennessee); Akadémie Mathématique of Philosophical Sound Research (Los Angeles, California)
- Genre: Country
- Length: 42:15
- Label: American
- Producer: Rick Rubin; John Carter Cash

Johnny Cash chronology
Love, God and Murder (2000)	American III: Solitary Man (2000)	Return to the Promised Land (2000)

American series chronology
Unchained (1996)	American III: Solitary Man (2000)	American IV: The Man Comes Around (2002)

American III: Solitary Man is the sixty-sixth studio album by Johnny Cash. It was released on October 17, 2000, by American Recordings. It is the third album in Cash's American series, and the penultimate studio album to be released during his lifetime.

== Background ==
Between American II: Unchained and American III: Solitary Man, Cash's health declined due to various ailments, and he was even hospitalized for pneumonia. The illness forced him to curtail his touring. This album contained Cash's response to his illness, typified by a version of Tom Petty's "I Won't Back Down", as well as a version of U2's "One". Changes to Cash's voice due to his health problems are noticeable on most tracks when compared to his most recent preceding albums. Graeme Thomson has characterized "Solitary Man" as an act of emotional preservation.

=== Previous recordings ===
Three songs featured on the album had previously been recorded by Cash.

- "Field of Diamonds" was previously recorded by Cash with Waylon Jennings for their 1986 album Heroes.
- "Country Trash" was previously recorded by Cash for his 1973 album Any Old Wind That Blows.
- "I'm Leavin' Now" was previously recorded by Cash for his 1985 album Rainbow.

== Critical reception ==
Professional ratings
Review scores
Source	Rating
AllMusic	3/5 stars
Rolling Stone	3/5 stars
Pitchfork	(8.6/10)
The Rolling Stone Album Guide	4/5 stars

American III: Solitary Man received mostly positive reviews from critics. At Metacritic, which assigns a normalized rating out of 100 to reviews from mainstream critics, the album received an average score of 80, which indicates "generally favorable reviews", based on 15 reviews. In a positive review for Entertainment Weekly, David Browne gave the album a Grade A rating, saying, "Though the Man in Black has rarely sounded blacker, producer Rick Rubin frames that deep sea voice with harmonies and churchly organs, making for a dark angel beauty of an album that's austere but welcoming." A review from Sonicnet praised Cash's ability to interpret songs and make them his own, saying, "When a tune falls into the jurisdiction of the venerable country-folk troubadour, the accumulated details of any previous readings or associations are stripped away, and its core brilliantly revealed." A review published by Billboard said the album "may lack the immediate impact of its predecessors but is no less a masterpiece." Splendid said that "the covers on American III will attract the majority of listener attention; Cash's own material steals the show." Jim DeRogatis of The Chicago Sun-Times wrote that it as "arguably the strongest of his American Recordings" with the series' "single best performance and most inspired cover choice via Cash's rendition of the Death Row anthem 'The Mercy Seat' by Nick Cave and the Bad Seeds."

Rolling Stone gave a mixed review, saying that "the onus here lies on the production… Rick Rubin's work is too timid; mostly, the shy combos of guitar, fiddle and accordion, or Benmont Tench's subliminal contributions on keyboards, make up the kind of severe meal that one is forced to think of as tasteful."

In a mixed review, the A.V. Club said, "Like Neil Young's Silver And Gold, it feels like a thematically empty, knockabout place-holder. American Recordings, one of Cash's towering classics, was all devotion and doubt, a brilliant, raw-boned meditation on redemption and death. A loose, flat set of odds and ends, Solitary Man is merely a minor but endearing record from a man who seems to know he's given more than enough."

The Spin Cycle called the album "mixed, leaning at times to inadvertent novelty."

== Commercial performance ==
The album peaked at number eleven on the US Billboard Top Country Albums chart and at number 88 on the US Billboard 200.

== Track listing ==
No.	Title	Writer(s)	Length
1.	"I Won't Back Down" (with Tom Petty)	Tom Petty, Jeff Lynne	2:09
2.	"Solitary Man"	Neil Diamond	2:25
3.	"That Lucky Old Sun (Just Rolls Around Heaven All Day)"	Haven Gillespie, Beasley Smith	2:35
4.	"One"	Bono, Adam Clayton, The Edge, Larry Mullen	3:53
5.	"Nobody"	Bert Williams	3:14
6.	"I See a Darkness" (with Will Oldham)	Will Oldham	3:42
7.	"The Mercy Seat"	Nick Cave, Mick Harvey	4:35
8.	"Would You Lay with Me (In a Field of Stone)"	David Allan Coe	2:41
9.	"Field of Diamonds"	Johnny Cash, Jack Wesley Routh	3:15
10.	"Before My Time"	Cash	2:55
11.	"Country Trash"	Cash	1:47
12.	"Mary of the Wild Moor"	Dennis Turner	2:32
13.	"I'm Leavin' Now" (with Merle Haggard)	Cash	3:07
14.	"Wayfaring Stranger"	Traditional	3:19
Total length:			42:15

== Personnel ==
- Johnny Cash – vocals, guitar
- Norman Blake – guitar
- Mike Campbell – guitar
- June Carter Cash – vocals (9)
- Laura Cash – fiddle
- Sheryl Crow – vocals (9), accordion (12, 14)
- Merle Haggard – vocals and guitar (13)
- Will Oldham – vocals (6)
- Larry Perkins – guitar
- Tom Petty – vocals (1–2), organ (1)
- Randy Scruggs – guitar
- Marty Stuart – guitar
- Benmont Tench – piano, organ, harmonium

Production

- Rick Rubin – producer
- John Carter Cash – associate producer
- Lindsay Chase – production coordinator
- David R. Ferguson – engineer, mixing
- Richard Dodd – additional engineering
- D. Sardy – additional engineering
- David Schiffman – additional engineering, mixing (9)
- Eddie Schreyer – mastering
- Chuck Turner – digital editing
- Martyn Atkins – photography
- Billy Bowers – digital editing
- Danny Clinch – photography
- David Coleman – art direction

== Charts ==
=== Weekly charts ===
Album Chart	Peak position
Croatian International Albums (HDU)	16
Dutch Albums (Album Top 100)	93
German Albums (Offizielle Top 100)	63
Norwegian Albums (VG-lista)	20
Scottish Albums (OCC)	100
Swedish Albums (Sverigetopplistan)	43
US Billboard 200	88
US Top Country Albums (Billboard)	11
UK Country Albums (OCC)	3

=== Year-end charts ===
Chart (2001)	Position
Canadian Country Albums (Nielsen SoundScan)	84
US Top Country Albums (Billboard)	73

== Certifications ==
Region	Certification	Certified units/sales
United Kingdom (BPI)	Gold	100,000^{^}
United States	—	186,000
^{^} Shipments figures based on certification alone.

== Accolades ==
Year	Nominee / work	Award	Result
2001	"Solitary Man"	Grammy Award for Best Male Country Vocal Performance	Won
2001	American III: Solitary Man	Academy of Country Music Award for Album of the Year	Nominated
