= Texas 1947 =

Song by Johnny Cash

Single by Johnny Cash

from the album Look at Them Beans
- B-side: "I Hardly Ever Sing Beer Drinking Songs"
- Released: 1975
- Genre: Country
- Label: Columbia 3-10237
- Songwriter: Guy Clark
- Producer: Charlie Bragg

Johnny Cash singles chronology
"Look at Them Beans" (1975)	"Texas 1947" (1975)	"Strawberry Cake" (1976)

Audio
- "Texas 1947" on YouTube

"Texas 1947" (originally spelled "Texas - 1947") is a song written by Guy Clark and originally recorded by Johnny Cash for his 1975 album Look at Them Beans.

Released as a single later in that year, the song peaked at number 35 on US Billboard's country chart for the week of January 10, 1976. The B-side contained the song "I Hardly Ever Sing Beer Drinking Songs" from the same album.

== Track listing ==
7" single (Columbia 3-10237, 1975)
No.	Title	Writer(s)	Length
1.	"Texas - 1947"	G. Clark	3:10
2.	"I Hardly Ever Sing Beer Drinking Songs"	J. R. Cash	2:34

== Charts ==
Chart (1975–1976)	Peak position
US Hot Country Songs (Billboard)	35
