= When the Roll Is Called Up Yonder =

1893 hymn with words and music by James Milton Black

When The Roll Is Called Up Yonder
- by James Milton Black
- Genre: Hymn
- Written: 1893
- Based on: 1 Thessalonians 4:16
- Meter: 15.11.15.11 with refrain
- Melody: "Roll Call"

When the Roll Is Called Up Yonder is an 1893 hymn with words and music by James Milton Black. It is one of the most popular Christian hymns of all time. The song was inspired by the idea of The Book of Life mentioned in the Bible, and by the absence of a child in Black's Sunday school class when the attendance was taken. The idea of someone's being not in attendance in heaven haunted Black, and after visiting the child's home and calling on a doctor to attend her for pneumonia, he went home and wrote the song after not finding one on a similar topic in his hymn collection. The song's lyrics were first published in a collection titled Songs of the Soul and the song has since been translated into at least 14 languages and sung all over the world in a variety of Christian denominations. There are more than 500 versions available on such sites as Amazon, recorded by various artists such as Loretta Lynn, Johnny Cash, Bim Sherman, Jim Nabors, and Willie Nelson, to the traditional tune. The lyrics have also been set to new music by contemporary gospel artists such as Doris Johnson. In 1945, British Prime Minister Winston Churchill created a stir in the British press when he quoted the hymn in response to a question about when the Big Three were going to meet; stated the Winnipeg Free Press: "Mr. Churchill, in one of his somewhat puckish moods, replied that he did not know, but, he added irreverently, 'When the roll is called up yonder, I'll be there.'" The British press expressed surprise at Churchill, an Anglican, being familiar with a hymn more associated with Methodism, Presbyterianism, and other "chapel" denominations or the revival meetings of Dwight L. Moody and Ira D. Sankey or R. A. Torrey and Charles McCallon Alexander, whereas the Free Press speculated that Churchill might well have heard the "catchy" tune in the street meetings held by the Salvation Army. He might also have remembered the lyrics from the 1941 movie Sergeant York.
