= James Milton Black =

American composer of hymns, choir leader and Sunday school teacher

James Milton Black (19 August 1856 – 21 December 1938) was an American composer of hymns, choir leader and Sunday school teacher.

Black was born in South Hill, New York, but worked, lived and died in Williamsport, Pennsylvania. It is there that he worked at his Methodist Episcopal Church.

His first hymnal collections were:

- Songs of the Soul (1894)
- Songs of the Soul, Number Two (1896)

Some of his hymns include:

- Come, Oh, Come to Me
- The Day of All Days
- We Shall Reign with Him in Glory
- When The Roll Is Called Up Yonder

Some of hymn music with lyrics by others include:

- A Home in My Heart for Jesus
- I Remember Calvary
- When the Saints Go Marching In (1896)

The lyrics to When the Saints are Marching In are by Katharine Purvis. This song is not to be confused with "When The Saints Go Marching In," which was published afterwards in 1927 with similar words and music, certainly derivative.
