= I Hung My Head =

Song by Sting

from the album Mercury Falling
- Released: 26 February 1996
- Studio: Lake House (Wiltshire)
- Genre: Rock
- Length: 4:40
- Label: A&M
- Songwriter: Sting
- Producers: Sting; Hugh Padgham

"I Hung My Head" is a song written by the singer-songwriter Sting and released on the 1996 album Mercury Falling. It reflects Sting's childhood fondness for TV Westerns, as well as his avowed interest in country music, but also tackles deeper and more philosophical themes of life, death, justice and redemption. It tells the story of a boy who accidentally shoots a stranger, the resulting shame, and the consequences he faces.

Blue Highway released a bluegrass version of the song in 1999 on their self-titled album Blue Highway. In 2002, Johnny Cash covered the song in the album American IV: The Man Comes Around. Sting re-recorded the song in an orchestral version for his 2010 album Symphonicities.

== Theme ==
The story is told from the point of view of a young man who takes his brother's rifle out with him one morning. He points the rifle at a man who is riding a horse in the distance ("I drew a bead on him; to practice my aim.") The rifle discharges by accident, killing the rider.

The man runs to the salt lands, throwing the rifle into a stream. (The Cash cover changes "salt lands" to "south lands", and "stream" to "sheen". Sting supposed the latter was due to a misprint in the lyrics Cash was using.) He is discovered by a sheriff, and is struck by the realization of what he has done.

He is brought before a judge and jury, where he begs forgiveness and wishes he were dead. In the start of his answer to the judge he states “I felt the power of death over life” which could possibly reveal that it was not an accident. Awaiting execution on the gallows, he sees as a "trick of the brain" the rider return, so that they will ride together "till kingdom come". The man prays to God for mercy.

== Compositional structure ==
The song is one of very few popular tunes written in 9/8. The 9/8 is subdivided into 2 + 3 + 2 + 2, counted as “1-2, 1-2-3, 1-2, 1-2”; this is emphasised by the general bass line on beats 1, 6, 8, and the drums on beats 1, 3, 8. (This time signature is reminiscent of the Bulgarian aksak rhythm Grancharsko horo which is counted in the same way.) In the cover by Johnny Cash (and, later, by Bruce Springsteen), the time signature of the song was simplified to a standard 4/4 time, which naturally abbreviates the pauses between the phrases of the melody.

In Sting's original version, the key is B♭ Major. The guitar part by Dominic Miller is played with a capo on the 1st fret.

== Appearances ==
Johnny Cash's cover version of the song was used in the Season Six premiere of The Shield, and was played over the opening and closing of the episode. The episode dealt with the aftermath (guilt, recriminations and anger) of the murder of a central character by his partner, who mistakenly believed that the victim had betrayed him.

Bruce Springsteen covered the song at the 2014 Kennedy Center Honors where Sting was one of the honorees.
