= Hurt (Nine Inch Nails song) =

1994 song by Nine Inch Nails

Promotional single by Nine Inch Nails

from the album The Downward Spiral
- Released: April 17, 1995
- Recorded: 1993
- Studio: A&M, Hollywood, California; Record Plant, Hollywood, California; Le Pig, Benedict Canyon, Los Angeles
- Genre: Alternative rock; post-rock; industrial rock
- Length: 6:12
- Label: Nothing; TVT; Interscope
- Songwriter: Trent Reznor
- Producer: Trent Reznor

The Downward Spiral track listing
- 14 tracks: 1. "Mr. Self Destruct"; 2. "Piggy"; 3. "Heresy"; 4. "March of the Pigs"; 5. "Closer"; 6. "Ruiner"; 7. "The Becoming"; 8. "I Do Not Want This"; 9. "Big Man With A Gun"; 10. "A Warm Place"; 11. "Eraser"; 12. "Reptile"; 13. "The Downward Spiral"; 14. "Hurt"

Audio
- "Hurt" on YouTube

"Hurt" is a song by American industrial rock band Nine Inch Nails from its 1994 studio album The Downward Spiral—where it is the closing song on the album—written by Trent Reznor. It was subsequently released on April 17, 1995, as a promotional single from the album, wherein it was issued straight to radio. The song received a Grammy Award nomination for Best Rock Song in 1996. In 2020, Kerrang! and Billboard ranked the song number two and number three, respectively, on their lists of the greatest Nine Inch Nails songs.

In 2002, American country singer Johnny Cash covered "Hurt" to commercial and critical acclaim. The related music video is considered one of the greatest of all time by publications such as NME. Reznor praised Cash's interpretation of the song for its "sincerity and meaning", going so far as to say "that song isn't mine anymore".

== Meaning ==
"Hurt" (Nine Inch Nails version)

The song includes references to self-harm and heroin addiction, though the overall meaning of the song is disputed. Some listeners contend that the song acts as a suicide note written by the song's protagonist, as a result of his depression, while others claim that it describes the difficult process of finding a reason to live in spite of depression and pain and does not have much to do with the storyline of The Downward Spiral.

== Music video ==
The music video for Nine Inch Nails' original version of "Hurt" is a live performance that was recorded before the show in Omaha, Nebraska, on February 13, 1995, and can be found on Closure and the DualDisc re-release of The Downward Spiral. The audio portion appears on the UK version of Further Down the Spiral. The version released on Closure differs slightly from the video originally aired on MTV. In addition to using an uncensored audio track, the Closure edit shows alternate views of the audience and performance at several points during the video.

To film the video, a scrim was dropped in front of the band on stage, projected onto which were various images to add visual symbolism to fit the song's subject matter, such as war atrocities, a nuclear bomb test, survivors of the Battle of Stalingrad, a snake staring at the camera, and a time-lapse film of a fox decomposing in reverse. A spotlight was cast on Reznor so that he can be seen through the images. Compared to the live renditions performed on future tours, this version most resembles the studio recording with its use of the song's original samples.

There are also official live recordings on the later releases And All That Could Have Been and Beside You in Time. Each version features distinct instrumentation by the varying members of the band in the respective eras.

== Live performances ==
During the Dissonance Tour in 1995, when Nine Inch Nails opened for David Bowie during his Outside Tour, Bowie sang "Hurt" in a duet with Reznor, backed by an original melody and beat. This served as the conclusion to the dual act that began each Bowie set.

During the Fragility Tour, the progression was performed by Robin Finck on acoustic guitar rather than on piano.

Since the 2005–06 Live: With Teeth Tour, Nine Inch Nails has been playing "Hurt" in a more toned-down style, featuring only Reznor on vocals until the final chorus, when the rest of the band joins in.

The song was brought back to its original form during the Lights In The Sky Tour in 2008, before returning to the toned down style on the 2009 Wave Goodbye tour.

== Track listing ==
- US promotional CD single
1. "Hurt" (quiet version) (clean) – 5:04
2. "Hurt" (live version) (clean) – 5:15
3. "Hurt" (album version) (clean) – 6:16
4. "Hurt" (quiet version) (soiled) – 5:21
5. "Hurt" (live version) (soiled) – 5:15
6. "Hurt" (album version) (soiled) – 6:13

== Personnel ==
- Trent Reznor – vocals, guitars, bass guitar, piano, sampling, production, mixing
- Chris Vrenna – drums

== Charts ==
| Chart (1995) | Peak position |
|---|---|
| Canada Rock/Alternative (RPM) | 8 |
| US Radio Songs (Billboard) | 54 |
| US Alternative Airplay (Billboard) | 8 |

== In popular culture ==
The song was featured in the season two finale of the adult animated science fiction program Rick and Morty, overlaying the series of events in which Rick surrenders to the intergalactic authorities, allowing his family to return to Earth while simultaneously abandoning them.

== Johnny Cash version ==
"Hurt"

Single by Johnny Cash

from the album American IV: The Man Comes Around
- B-side: "Personal Jesus"; "Wichita Lineman"
- Released: March 2003
- Recorded: 2002
- Genre: Country; acoustic rock; gothic country
- Length: 3:38
- Label: American; Lost Highway
- Songwriter: Trent Reznor
- Producer: Rick Rubin

Johnny Cash singles chronology
| "Personal Jesus" (2002) | "Hurt" (2003) | "God's Gonna Cut You Down" (2006) |

Music video
- "Hurt" on YouTube

In 2002, American country singer Johnny Cash covered the song for his final album during his lifetime, American IV: The Man Comes Around. Its accompanying video, featuring images from Cash's life and directed by Mark Romanek, was named the best video of the year by the Grammy Awards and CMA Awards, and the best video of all time by NME in July 2011. The single contains a cover of Depeche Mode's "Personal Jesus" as a B-side.

Cash's cover of the song had sold 2,148,000 downloads in the United States as of March 2017.

Cash's cover is widely considered one of his best works. In 2017, Billboard ranked the song number four on their list of the 15 greatest Johnny Cash songs, and in 2021, American Songwriter ranked the song number three on their list of the 10 greatest Johnny Cash songs.

=== Background ===
When Reznor was asked if Cash could cover his song, Reznor said he was "flattered" but worried that "the idea sounded a bit gimmicky." He became a fan of Cash's version, however, once he saw the music video.

A few weeks later, a CD shows up with the track. Again, I'm in the middle of something and put it on and give it a cursory listen. It sounded... weird to me. That song in particular was straight from my soul, and it felt very strange hearing the highly identifiable voice of Johnny Cash singing it. It was a good version, and I certainly wasn't cringing or anything, but it felt like I was watching my girlfriend fuck somebody else. Or something like that. Anyway, a few weeks later, a videotape shows up with Mark Romanek's video on it. It's morning; I'm in the studio in New Orleans working on Zack De La Rocha's record with him; I pop the video in, and... wow. Tears welling, silence, goose-bumps... Wow. I just lost my girlfriend, because that song isn't mine any more. Then it all made sense to me. It really made me think about how powerful music is as a medium and art form. I wrote some words and music in my bedroom as a way of staying sane, about a bleak and desperate place I was in, totally isolated and alone. Some-fucking-how that winds up reinterpreted by a music legend from a radically different era/genre and still retains sincerity and meaning – different, but every bit as pure. Things felt even stranger when he passed away. The song's purpose shifted again. It's incredibly flattering as a writer to have your song chosen by someone who's a great writer and a great artist.

— Geoff Rickly interviews Trent Reznor, Alternative Press

Mike Campbell (acoustic guitar) and Benmont Tench (piano, organ, Mellotron) of Tom Petty and the Heartbreakers played on the track. Smokey Hormel also played guitar on the track.

=== Music video ===
The music video was directed by former Nine Inch Nails collaborator Mark Romanek, who sought to capture the essence of Cash, both in his youth and in his older years. In a montage of shots of Cash's early years, twisted imagery of fruit and flowers in various states of decay, seem to capture both his legendary past and the stark and seemingly cruel reality of the present. Much of the video is in a style deliberately reminiscent of vanitas paintings, thus emphasizing the lyrics' mood of the futility and passing nature of human achievements. According to literature professor Leigh H. Edwards, the music video portrays "Cash's own paradoxical themes".

Romanek had this to say about his decision to focus on the House of Cash museum in Nashville:

It had been closed for a long time; the place was in such a state of dereliction. That's when I got the idea that maybe we could be extremely candid about the state of Johnny's health, as candid as Johnny has always been in his songs.

Romanek also said "the sadness in the video is genuine":

Johnny said that “Hurt” was the best anti-drug song he’d ever heard. The rage you see when he pours the wine on the table or starts to weep is a direct result of having lost people to addictions — and almost having lost himself.

When the video was filmed in February 2003, Cash was 71 years old and had serious health problems. His frailty is clearly evident in the video. He died seven months later, on September 12. His wife, June Carter Cash, who is shown gazing at her husband in two sequences of the video, had died on May 15 of the same year.

On Cash's passing, Bono called it "perhaps the best video ever made", and Emmylou Harris that it reminded us "videos can actually have a profound effect on us" In July 2011, the music video was named one of "The 30 All-TIME Best Music Videos" by Time. It was ranked the greatest music video of all time by NME. It was ranked the second best music video by Rolling Stone Magazine in July 2021.

The house where Cash's music video for "Hurt" was shot, which was Cash's home for nearly 30 years, was destroyed in a fire on April 10, 2007.

=== Awards ===
- The Johnny Cash cover was given the Country Music Association award for "Single of the Year" in 2003. It ranked as CMT's top video for 2003, No. 1 on CMT's 100 Greatest Country Music Videos the following year (and again in 2008), and No. 1 on the Top 40 Most Memorable Music Videos on MuchMoreMusic's Listed in October 2007. The song is also Cash's sole chart entry on the Billboard Modern Rock Tracks chart, where it hit No. 33 in 2003. In June 2009, the song was voted No. 1 in UpVenue's Top 10 Best Music Covers.
- "Hurt" was nominated for six awards at the 2003 MTV Video Music Awards, winning for Best Cinematography. With the video, Johnny Cash became the oldest artist ever nominated for an MTV Video Music Award. Justin Timberlake, who won Best Male Video that year for "Cry Me a River", said in his acceptance speech that the MTV Video Music Award for Best Male Video should have gone to Cash.
- The music video won the 2004 Grammy Award for Best Short Form Music Video.
- In May 2010, 'Hurt' was voted the fifth most influential video of all time by MySpace.
- In October 2011, NME placed it at number 35 on its list "150 Best Tracks of the Past 15 Years".
- In a 2014 survey conducted by the BBC the UK public voted the Johnny Cash version the second greatest cover version (of any song) of all time.

=== Track listing ===
- European CD single
1. "Hurt" – 3:38
2. "Personal Jesus" – 3:21
3. "Wichita Lineman" – 3:06
4. "Hurt" (music video)

=== Charts ===
| Chart (2003) | Peak position |
|---|---|
| Canada (Nielsen SoundScan) | 38 |
| Germany (Official German Charts) | 75 |
| Ireland (IRMA) | 25 |
| UK Singles (Official Charts) | 39 |
| US Alternative Airplay (Billboard) | 33 |
| US Hot Country Songs (Billboard) | 56 |

| Chart (2005) | Peak position |
|---|---|
| US Digital Song Sales (Billboard) | 34 |

| Chart (2006) | Peak position |
|---|---|
| Norway (VG-lista) | 8 |

| Chart (2012) | Peak position |
|---|---|
| Canada (Nielsen SoundScan) | 42 |
| Germany (GfK) | 68 |
| US Digital Song Sales (Billboard) | 69 |
| US Alternative Digital Song Sales (Billboard) | 9 |

| Chart (2016) | Peak position |
|---|---|
| Australia (ARIA) | 66 |
| France (SNEP) | 52 |
| Scottish Singles Sales (Official Charts) | 33 |
| US Country Streaming Songs (Billboard) | 22 |
| US Rock Digital Song Sales (Billboard) | 9 |

=== Certifications ===
| Region | Certification | Certified units/sales |
|---|---|---|
| Brazil (Pro-Música Brasil) | Gold | 20,000^{‡} |
| Denmark (IFPI Danmark) | Gold | 45,000^{‡} |
| Germany (BVMI) | Gold | 150,000^{‡} |
| Italy (FIMI) | Gold | 25,000^{‡} |
| New Zealand (RMNZ) | 2× Platinum | 60,000^{‡} |
| Spain (Promusicae) | Gold | 30,000^{‡} |
| United Kingdom (BPI) | Platinum | 600,000^{‡} |
| United States (RIAA) digital | Gold | 2,148,000 |
| United States (RIAA) video single | 2× Platinum | 100,000^{^} |
^{^} Shipments figures based on certification alone.^{‡} Sales+streaming figures based on certification alone.

== Other versions ==
The song has been used in the 140-second advertisement "This is Why" created for the SickKids Foundation by Cossette in 2019 as part of the "SickKids Vs." campaign to support fundraising for The Hospital for Sick Children in Toronto.

In 2019 Mumford & Sons performed a cover version as a ballad in their show at Quicken Loans Arena in Cleveland, Ohio, Trent Reznor's origin city.

In 2025, Between the Buried and Me covered the song for the Magnetic Eye Records compilation album The Downward Spiral (Redux).
