= One Piece at a Time (album) =

Studio album by Johnny Cash
- Released: May 17, 1976
- Recorded: 1975–1976
- Genre: Country
- Length: 29:36
- Label: Columbia
- Producer: Charlie Bragg; Don Davis

Johnny Cash chronology
Strawberry Cake (1976)	One Piece at a Time (1976)	The Last Gunfighter Ballad (1977)

Singles from One Piece at a Time
- 1. "One Piece at a Time" Released: 1976; 2. "Sold Out of Flagpoles" Released: 1976

Professional ratings
Review scores
Source	Rating
Allmusic	3/5 stars

One Piece at a Time is the 54th overall album by American country singer Johnny Cash, released in 1976 on Columbia Records. "One Piece at a Time", which was a #1 hit, is a humorous tale of an auto worker on the Detroit assembly line who puts together a car out of parts he swipes from the plant. "Sold Out of Flag Poles" also charted as a single, reaching #29 on the country singles charts. "Committed to Parkview", a Cash original, would be re-recorded in 1985 by Cash, Waylon Jennings, Kris Kristofferson and Willie Nelson, collectively known as The Highwaymen, on their first album, Highwayman; it is one of the few country songs sung from the perspective of a patient at a mental hospital.

The album is notable for being credited to "Johnny Cash and the Tennessee Three", a credit that hadn't been used on Cash releases since the 1960s, and for featuring Cash's recording of "Love Has Lost Again", written by his daughter, Rosanne Cash prior to the launch of her own solo career. On "Let There Be Country", the album's opening track, Cash shares songwriting credit with Shel Silverstein, who had written Cash's biggest hit up to this time, "A Boy Named Sue".

"Go On Blues" was later re-recorded during the American Recordings session with Rick Rubin. It was not on the album but part of the promo single for "Delia's Gone".

== Track listing ==
All tracks composed by Johnny Cash, except where indicated.

No.	Title	Writer(s)	Length
1.	"Let There Be Country"	Johnny Cash, Shel Silverstein	2:58
2.	"One Piece at a Time"	Wayne Kemp	4:04
3.	"In a Young Girl's Mind"	Hoyt Axton, Mark Dawson	3:09
4.	"Mountain Lady"		2:43
5.	"Michigan City Howdy Do"		2:26
6.	"Sold Out of Flag Poles"		2:45
7.	"Committed to Parkview"		3:14
8.	"Daughter of a Railroad Man"		3:12
9.	"Love Has Lost Again"	Rosanne Cash	2:24
10.	"Go On Blues"		2:23

== Personnel ==
- Johnny Cash - vocals, acoustic guitar
- Bob Wootton, Bobby Thompson, Pete Wade, Dave Kirby, Jerry Hensley, Jack Routh, Helen Carter Jones, Jimmy Capps - guitar
- Marshall Grant, Henry Strzelecki, Joe Allen - bass
- WS Holland, Willie Ackerman, Jerry Carrigan, Kenny Malone - drums
- Lloyd Green - steel guitar
- Tommy Williams - mandolin
- Tommy Jackson, Buddy Spicher, Johnny Gimble - fiddle
- Bobby Wood, David Briggs, Larry McCoy, Earl Poole Ball - piano
- Charlie McCoy - harmonica
- George Tidwell - trumpet
- The Nashville Edition - vocals

Additional personnel

- Produced by Charlie Bragg and Don Davis
- "Michigan City Howdy Do" and "Daughter of a Railroad Man" produced by Charlie Bragg
- "Committed to Parkview" produced by Don Davis
- Recorded at House of Cash Recording Studio
- Engineers: Charlie Bragg, Roger Tucker, Danny Jones, Chuck Bragg
- Cover photo: Mike Woosley
- Liner notes: Johnny Cash

== Charts ==
Chart (1976)	Peak position
US Top LPs & Tape (Billboard)	185
US Country LPs (Billboard)	2

Singles - Billboard (United States)

Year	Single	Chart	Position
1976	"One Piece at a Time"	Country Singles	1
1976	"One Piece at a Time"	Pop Singles	29
1976	"Sold Out of Flagpoles"	Country Singles	29
