= House of Cash =

Former museum and headquarters of Johnny Cash

Coordinates: 36.32523°N 86.56665°W

The House of Cash was a museum in Hendersonville, Tennessee, owned by American musician Johnny Cash and his wife June Carter Cash, and devoted to his life and work. With part of the building also used as their headquarters offices, the museum opened in 1970, adapted from a dinner theatre built in 1960. It closed by 1995. It was located at 700 East Main Street (now known as Johnny Cash Parkway).

A new and unrelated Johnny Cash Museum opened in Nashville, Tennessee, in 2013.

== History ==
The House of Cash was adapted from the 15,000 square foot Plantation Dinner Theatre built in 1960. Johnny Cash and June Carter Cash purchased the two-story building in 1970, and it became the House of Cash Inc. headquarters and museum. The headquarters had about 30 employees. To expand the headquarters, in 1980, the Amqui Train Station in Madison, Tennessee was purchased and moved to House of Cash Inc. The Amqui Train Station served as an antique store operated by June Carter for 10 years, called Amqui Antique Store.

In 2004 the headquarters, museum, and store were purchased by HALO Realty and HALO Builders. The Amqui Train Station was donated to the city of Madison by HALO's founder, Danny Hale. The House of Cash Building has been adapted for 15,000 square feet of office space. Hale used the former museum as headquarters for his many contributions to the City of Hendersonville TN including donation of land for the Hendersonville Public Library, development of the city's largest retail development Indian Lake Village, and a new fire hall in the Winston Hills residential development on property formerly owned by Cash.,

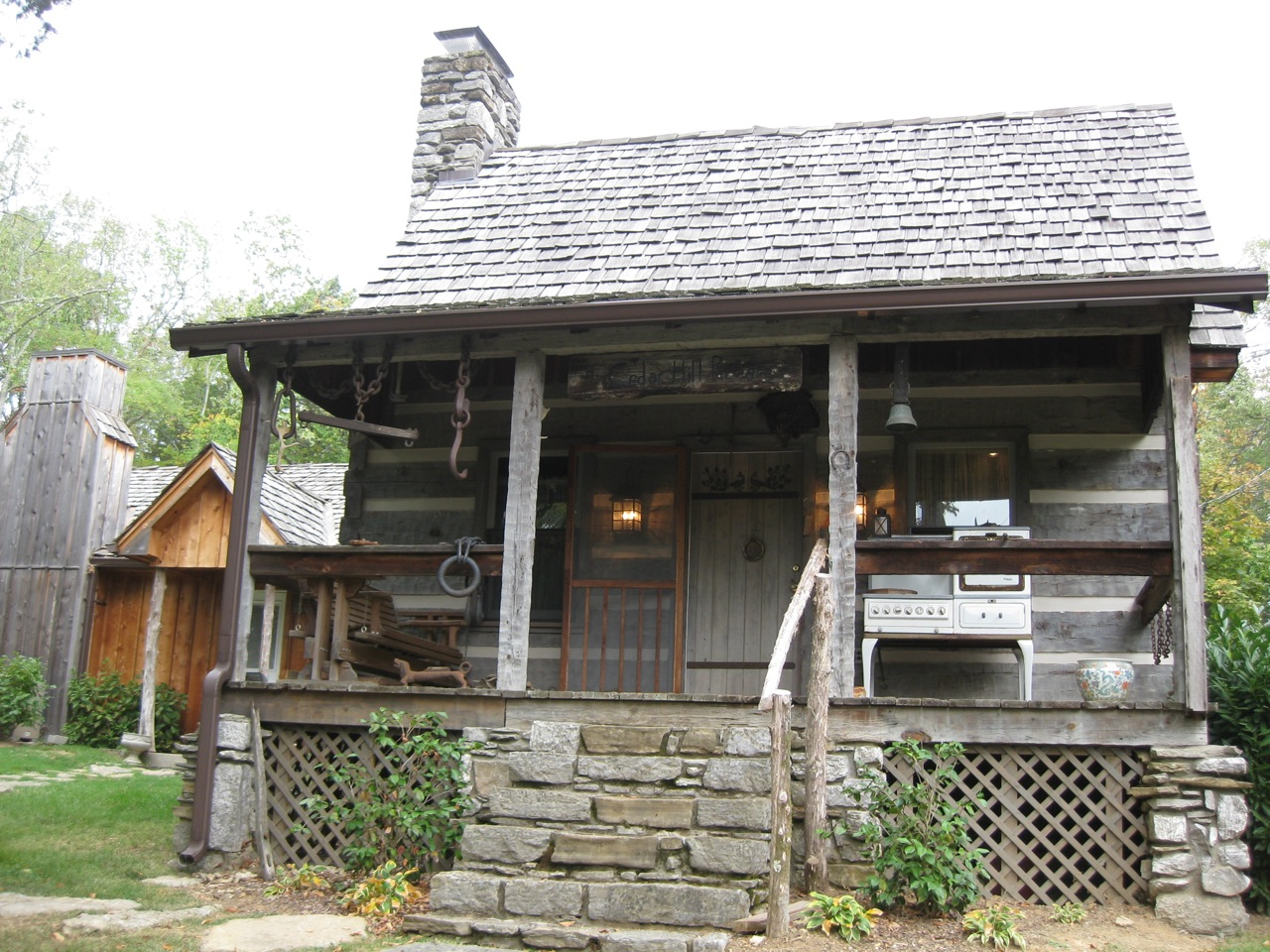
Cash Cabin Studio

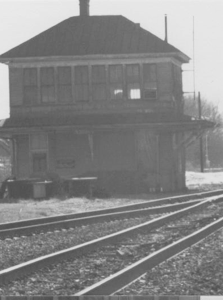
Amqui Train Station in 1915, later moved to House of Cash, and used as June Carter's antique store, called Amqui

== House of Cash Records ==
House of Cash Records, House of Cash, House of Cash Recording Studios is the Cash family's Record label that has published the works of Johnny Cash and his family. The Cash family recordings includes: June Carter Cash, Anita Carter, John Carter Cash, Carlene Carter, Rosanne Cash, Laura Weber Cash, The Carter Family, Tommy Cash, and The Cash Crew Band. In addition to Cash family releases, friends of the Cash family have also been published like: Ernest Tubb, Hank Williams Jr., Don King, Carl Perkins, Porter Wagoner, Dick Curless, Bobby Weir, The Statler Brothers, Jerry Lee Lewis and Jean Shepard. Cash House Records released both albums and many promo singles. Cash House Records was headquartered at the House of Cash until it closed. At the closure, John Cash gave Gregg Geller many Cash tapes found at the House of Cash, many were not cataloged, Geller cataloged what he called "The Hendersonville tapes". From this Geller released in 2006 Bootleg I: The Personal Files, a collection of solo work by Cash from 1972-82.

== Johnny Cash residence ==
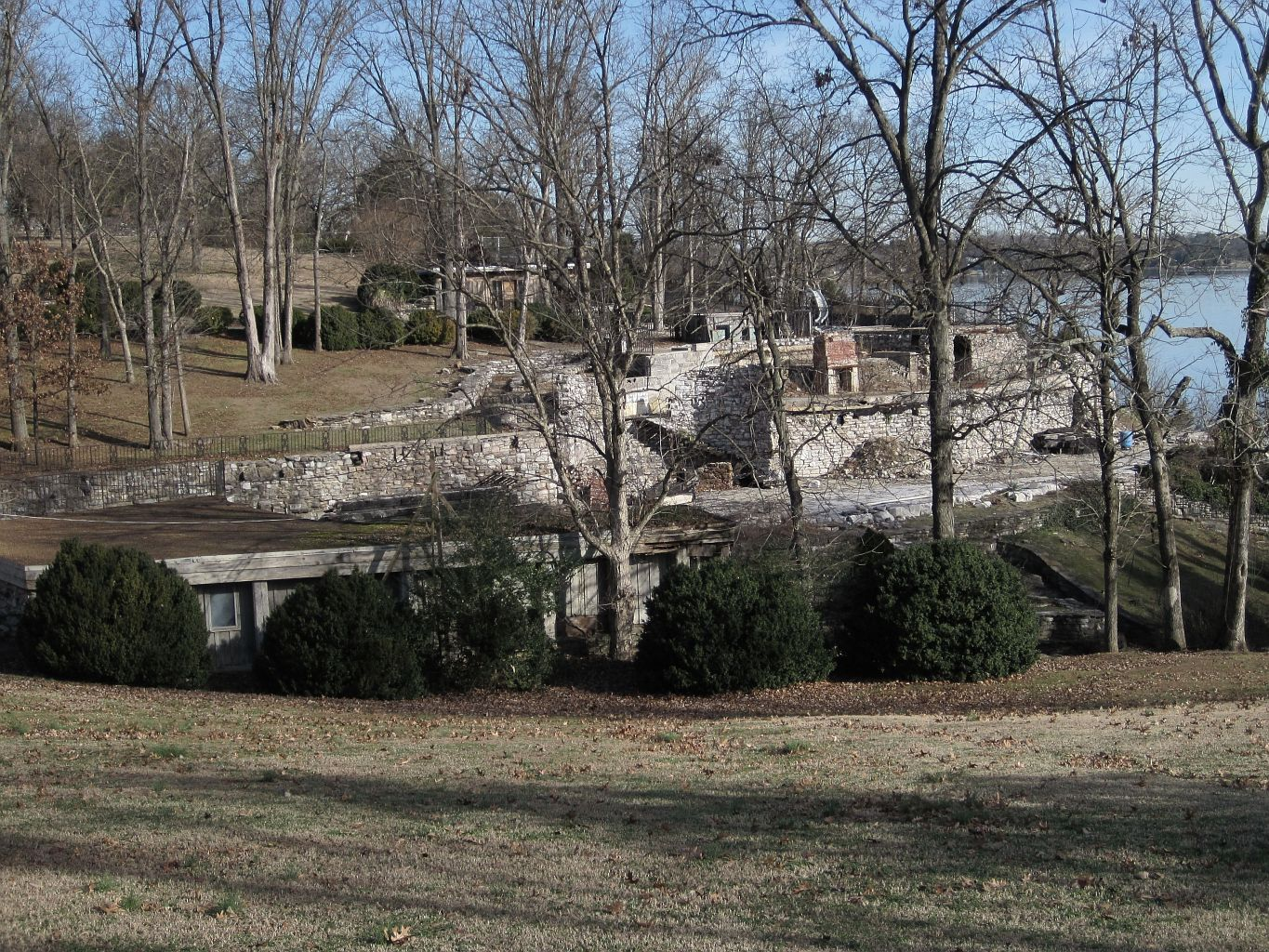
Johnny Cash home in ruins in Hendersonville in 2013

Cash and his wife lived nearby at 200 Caudill Drive in Hendersonville, overlooking Old Hickory Lake, from 1968 until Cash's death in 2003. The mansion covered 14,000 square feet (1,300 m^{2}).

On this home property Cash built a log cabin in 1979, using it for rest and song writing. Later he adapted it as a sound studio, Cash Cabin Studio.

Johnny Cash's parents, Ray and Carrie, lived across the road from his mansion on the waterfront.

Barry Gibb purchased the estate in 2006. The house burned down during renovations in 2007. The Gibbs built a new house on higher ground, keeping the original Cash home foundations as a testament to the memory of Cash. The new house has been sold a few times.

== House of Cash: The Legacies of My Father, Johnny Cash ==
House of Cash: The Legacies of My Father, Johnny Cash (2015) is a biography by son John Carter Cash.

== See also ==
- Johnny Cash Boyhood Home
- List of music museums
