= Bob Adams (American football) =

American football player (born 1946)

- Born: August 15, 1946 (age 80); Stockton, California, U.S.
- Education: El Camino High School
- Occupation: Spokesperson for the Church of Scientology
- Employer: Church of Scientology International
- Known for: NFL tight end Scientology official
- Height: 6 ft 2 in (188 cm)
- Spouse: (divorced)
- Children: 1
- Football career

No. 85
- Position: Tight end

Personal information
- Listed height: 6 ft 2 in (1.88 m)
- Listed weight: 225 lb (102 kg)

Career information
- High school: El Camino High School
- College: College of San Mateo; University of the Pacific

Career history
- 1969–1972: Pittsburgh Steelers
- 1973–1974: New England Patriots
- 1975: Houston Oilers*
- 1975: Denver Broncos
- 1976: San Francisco 49ers*
- 1976: Atlanta Falcons
- * Offseason or practice squad member only
- Stats at Pro Football Reference

Robert Bruce Adams (born August 15, 1946) is an American former professional football tight end in the National Football League (NFL) and a spokesperson for the Church of Scientology International. He attended El Camino High School during the 1960s, and was encouraged by a coach at the College of San Mateo to play football. He played for a single season at the college, during 1966, while participating in other sports at the school including track-and-field and basketball. A former coach of the College of San Mateo, Doug Scovil, recruited Adams to the College of the Pacific, where he received a full scholarship to play football there. By 1968, he was captain of the team's offense at the school.

He was not drafted by the National Football League, and was signed as a free agent with the Pittsburgh Steelers, where he played under coach Chuck Noll. In 1973 while a member of the Pittsburgh Steelers, Adams became a Scientologist. He said applying Scientology methodology helped his performance playing football. After seven years with the National Football League, Adams finished his pro-career as a member of the Atlanta Falcons. He subsequently took up other professions, including owning a fitness center in Redwood City, California, being a consultant for high tech companies, and working as a teacher.

In 2004, Adams served within the Scientology organization as senior vice president of its Association for Better Living and Education (ABLE), a nonprofit founded by Scientology members in 1988 to supervise the secular programs Narconon, Criminon, The Way to Happiness, and Applied Scholastics. By 2006 he had become a media executive and vice president of the Church of Scientology, and worked out of the organization's facilities in Hollywood. He represented the Church of Scientology at the 2006 conference of the Religion Newswriters Association in Utah. Adams held the position of vice president of public affairs for the Church of Scientology International in 2009, and was a Reverend within the organization. He traveled to Melbourne, Australia, in December 2009 for the World Religions Conference. He continued to serve as vice president of the Church of Scientology International in 2010, and was one of four officials listed as spokespersons for the church.

== Early life and education ==
Robert Bruce Adams was born August 15, 1946, in Stockton, California. He attended El Camino High School during the 1960s, and quit playing American football during his senior year at the school, due to his small stature. After high school, he went to College of San Mateo, and a coach named Stu Carter noticed Adams while he was weight lifting at the college. Carter convinced Adams to play football, and he played for a single season at the College of San Mateo; during 1966. Adams concurrently played track-and-field and basketball at the College of San Mateo.

After the College of San Mateo, he participated in football at University of the Pacific. He had played tight end at the College of San Mateo, and a former coach at the school, Doug Scovil, took interest in him. Scovill was managing the football program called College of the Pacific in Stockton, California; he offered Adams a full scholarship to play football. Adams's friend, Walt Harris, was a football player under Scovil; this combined with the full scholarship opportunity convinced Adams to join. He was a football player at College of the Pacific for two seasons, and by his senior year at the school in 1968 had become captain of the team's offense.

== National Football League ==
Adams was signed as a free agent by the Pittsburgh Steelers of the National Football League (NFL) after he was not selected in the 1969 NFL draft. His contract with the Steelers was worth US$15,000 plus a $1,000 signing bonus. Chuck Noll, a new coach in the NFL, supervised Adams's initial performance as a pro football player. Adams played for the Steelers in the position of tight end. He played in 42 games, starting 17, for the Steelers from 1969 to 1971. He was moved to the team's taxi squad on September 19, 1972, and spent the entire 1972 season there. He became a member of the Church of Scientology in 1973. Adams told Newsweek that he joined the church because he was looking for "assistance to become a better football player, teacher and parent ... [Scientology] was simple, precise, workable, and I saw effects immediately on the field." On May 16, 1973, Adams was traded to the New England Patriots for a 1974 draft pick. While a member of the Patriots in 1974, Adams attended an event held in Boston, Massachusetts sponsored by the Scientology organization, called the New England Conference on Drug Abuse. He played in 25 games, starting 12, for the Patriots from 1973 to 1974. On August 5, 1975, Adams was traded to the Houston Oilers for a 1976 seventh round draft pick. He was released by the Oilers on September 9, 1975. He was signed by the Denver Broncos on December 11, 1975, and appeared in two games for the team during the 1975 season. On June 30, 1976, Adams and Brian Goodman were traded to the San Francisco 49ers for Fair Hooker and an undisclosed draft pick. Goodman was later released by the 49ers on September 7, 1976, and then signed by the Atlanta Falcons the next day. He played in 13 games for the Falcons in 1976, earning a salary of $54,000 in his final year in the NFL. He was released on August 31, 1977. Overall, Adams played for seven years in the NFL. He played in a total of 82 games, with 29 of them being starts, while catching 61 passes for 732 yards.

== Scientology official ==
=== ABLE senior vice president ===
After finishing his career with the National Football League, Adams took up multiple other professions. He worked as a consultant for high tech companies, and as a teacher and author. He was the owner of an exercise facility in Redwood City, California. The Scientology publication Freewinds noted in 1990 that Adams had completed the highest Operating Thetan level of spiritual advancement, OT VIII. In 2004, Adams served as senior vice president of the Association for Better Living and Education (ABLE), a nonprofit founded by Scientology members in 1988 to supervise the secular programs Narconon, Criminon, The Way to Happiness, and Applied Scholastics. In an interview with the San Francisco Chronicle, Adams objected to an assessment that international Scientology management ran the subdivisions of ABLE. Adams stated, "ABLE does not report its statistics to the church." He commented on the purpose of Narconon, "We feel we're on a mission, and it's for the good of all of us. It's part of the overall plan to collaborate with other groups and bring about a shift in the culture with regard to drug education, prevention and rehabilitation."

=== CSI vice president ===
Adams worked in 2006 as a media executive for the Scientology organization out of its offices in Hollywood, California; he was a vice president of the Church of Scientology International in 2006. He represented the Church of Scientology at the 2006 conference of the Religion Newswriters Association in Utah, and participated in a panel discussion called, "Faiths That Don't Fit: Classifying and Reporting on 'Other' Churches". Adams discussed the Scientology policy of "fair game" in a 2008 interview with The Times: "That policy (of fair game) was yanked very quickly. As in any organisation made up of lots of people, some will be internal renegades, if you will. Those people paid the price. And those days are over now."

In 2008, Adams served as vice president of the Church of Scientology International. When asked in a January 2008 interview with The New Yorker about the Scientology story involving a galactic ruler named Xenu, Adams responded, "A small fraction of our scriptures are confidential, and I don't want to allude to something confidential." He asserted that the controversial Scientology program the "Rehabilitation Project Force" (RPF) was a "volunteer program for self-improvement". Adams commented about the RPF, "They get frequent breaks, eight hours of sleep, and three healthy meals. The principal part is auditing, but the physical activity is very extrovertive for the individual and is found to be very therapeutic in itself." Adams was interviewed on the NPR program Morning Edition in 2008 about the activism against Scientology by the Internet-based protest group Anonymous; he referred to the group as "cyber criminals", and commented: "It's very reminiscent of days gone by and current days with the KKK, wearing masks, hiding, having secret meetings on the Internet."

=== Spokesperson ===
He held the position of vice president of public affairs for the Church of Scientology International in 2009, and was a Reverend within the organization. Adams traveled to Melbourne, Australia, in December 2009 for the World Religions Conference. In an appearance on the Australian Broadcasting Corporation radio program hosted by Tony Eastley, AM, Adams stated, "From one church in 1954 to ... we're in 165 nations now; we have 8,000 churches, missions and groups right across this fair earth of ours." Adams disputed assertions of abuse within Scientology publicized on the floor of the Australian Senate by Senator Nick Xenophon and commented, "It's not that the allegations aren't serious charges; the fact of the matter is that they are unsubstantiated rumours. Many of these so-called charges, so-called allegations are very old. I mean, 12 or 15 years ago, these incidents occurred, were thoroughly reviewed." Regarding statements by Senator Xenophon that women within Scientology who became pregnant were pressured into having abortions, Adams said, "That's someone's statement of... it's totally false. There's no proof whatsoever; no one has ever made... no one has come forward and said here's the proof." Adams asserted to The Age that all of the critical statements made by Senator Xenophon about Scientology in the Australian Senate were "meritless". He commented, "One way to measure that is how law enforcement responds to any of these allegations. There has been no interest because there has been no evidence. Apostates are not credible witnesses, like former spouses or employees - they are trying to find a reason why they departed."

In July 2010 the Church of Scientology International publicized a "Scientology Newsroom" website tailored for members of the media; Adams was one of four international representatives for Scientology listed as "Spokespersons". Adams served as vice president of the Church of Scientology International in 2010. In his role as Scientology spokesman, he commented to The Seattle Times in August 2010 that critical articles including revelations from former members published in that year by the St. Petersburg Times of Florida were "based on lies by 'apostates' who want to see the church fail". Adams asserted, "The history of all new religions is they go through a time of trial where the public is skeptical." He stated that increased attention in the media to the organization could help to recruit more members, "It's a new religion. Whatever publicity we get, people are curious."

== Personal life ==
Adams's first child was born December 8, 1971. In 1972, Adams and his wife Marilyn resided with their baby son in Pittsburgh; they had a house in Bethel Park. In 2006, Adams was divorced, and had one child.

== See also ==
- New England Patriots all-time roster
- Pittsburgh Steelers all-time roster
- Office of Special Affairs
- Scientology in the United States
- Sea Org
