= The Maneater =

Student news publication at the University of Missouri

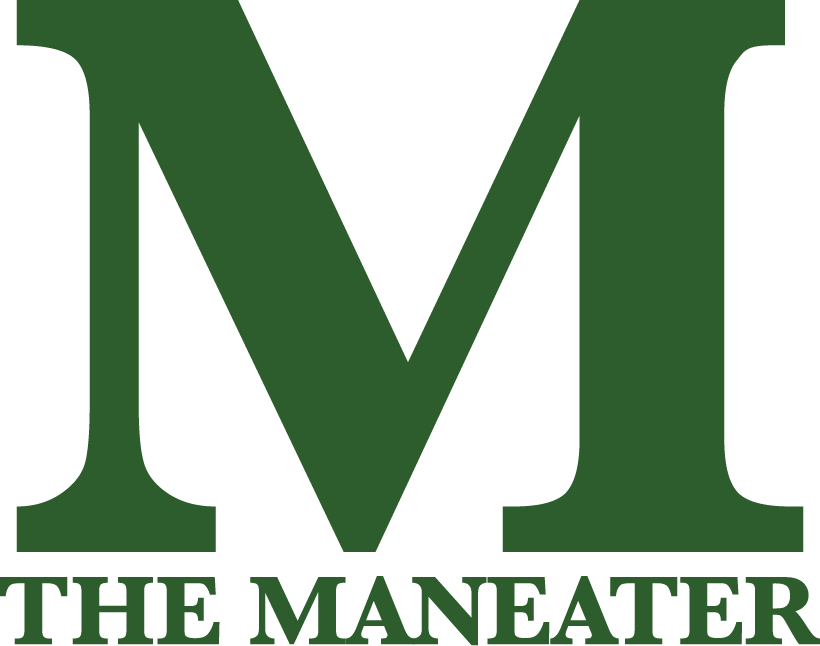

- Type: Online daily student newspaper
- Format: Online newspaper
- School: University of Missouri
- Founded: 1955
- Headquarters: G216 MU Student Center, Columbia, MO, 65211
- Website: themaneater.com

The Maneater is an official, editorially independent student news publication at the University of Missouri. The Maneater editorial and advertising staffs are composed entirely of students, with the exception of a professional business adviser. Financially, The Maneater is a non-profit publication funded by advertisers. The newspaper is distributed free of charge, and all aspects of its website remain accessible at no cost to readers. The editorial department of The Maneater remains independent from any student governments and organizations, as well as the Missouri School of Journalism and university itself.

== History ==
The Maneater was founded in 1955 by Joel Gold, then a sociology student, as editor-in-chief and Jim Willard as business manager. Gold took over the former newspaper, then named the Missouri Student and controlled by the Delta Upsilon fraternity. Gold renamed it The Maneater to reflect a more aggressive news angle and transitioned the paper into an independent watchdog of the university.

Regarding the name change, Gold wrote in the first issue of The Maneater, “The name ‘Missouri Student’ reflected the editorial policy of the former paper quite well. It signified nothing.... The Maneater by its very name cannot content itself with merely presenting the news.... The Maneater is a tiger with fangs bared and claws sharpened ready to analyze the facts and then to pounce. A tiger exists because it is, and not for one group or another.”

From 1969 to 2013, The Maneater newspaper was published twice weekly, on Tuesdays and Fridays, during the academic year. A growing desire for digital content led the paper to scale back to a weekly publishing schedule beginning in August 2013. In 2019, the paper had to change to a monthly printing cycle rather than weekly due to funding. As of March 2023, the newspaper is exclusively digital.

In lieu of a print edition, the 2023-24 editorial board elected to publish a special print edition of The Maneater each fall in correlation with the Homecoming festivities. The homecoming print edition is handed out to the public during C-deck and parade celebrations the weekend of homecoming.

== Independent news ==
Though the Missouri Student was established in 1926 as a student paper, it fell under the purview of a Student Publications Board made up of MU faculty and was printed by the School of Journalism. It was the publications board that invited Gold to apply for editor-in-chief following the noticeable shift that had occurred at the paper by 1950. The news publication developed into a Greek Town rag and society paper, favoring party commentary before news reporting. From 1950 to 1955, six members from the Delta Upsilon Fraternity controlled the paper. As circulation numbers dropped, the publications board sought to shake up the Student. Given the task of refurbishing the paper, Gold likened The Maneater's new editorial policy to an aggressive news source, with the goal of turning out stories that students would want to read.

The Maneater soon took to its stand as a harsh critic of student government, penning many articles and editorials on its practices. It went on to find its footing covering multiple wars and anti-war protests. In 1969, School of Journalism printers decided they couldn't typeset a caption describing the vulgarities of a cartoon printed and distributed by a student, later expelled from the university, on campus. Readers opened the paper to a series of dashes printed in the caption's place. According to the paper's university editor at the time, by the middle of the decade, the relationship between the university and The Maneater deteriorated.

Until 1970, an issue of The Maneater cost 10 cents. Facing harsh competition from an upstart rival paper called the Campus Courier, which distributed its issues at no cost to readers, The Maneater was forced to make itself free as well in order to compete, and although the Courier lasted only a year, the loss of 10 cents an issue and more competition for advertising put The Maneater into substantial debt that lasted until the middle of the decade. Nevertheless, The Maneater has remained free ever since.

The School of Journalism has offered to absorb The Maneater into its system many times through its history. However, The Maneater has remained afloat of its own accord and remains distant from any such attempts. Today, The Maneater is a division of the university's Department of Student Life. The paper was printed in Sedalia, Mo., and though a publications board still exists to handle the publication's internal matters, its editorial content remains independent of any university authority or student group.

== Awards ==
Both the newspaper and website are highly decorated publications. The Maneater has been consistently distinguished by state and national press honors, including several ACP Pacemaker Awards, Society of Professional Journalists Mark of Excellence Awards and Missouri College Media Association Better Newspaper Contest awards.

The Pacemaker Award, widely considered the Pulitzer Prize of collegiate journalism, has been awarded to The Maneater newspaper four times, in 1996, 1999, 2001 and 2007. The paper was a finalist in 1993, 1994, 2000 and 2012. The Maneater website has received the Online Pacemaker (established in 2000) five times, in 2000, 2001, 2002, 2009 and 2012. It was a finalist in 2005.

== MOVE Mag ==
Since 2002, The Maneater has also produced an entertainment weekly called MOVE Magazine. MOVE is aimed at local and national news as well as extensive coverage of lifestyle, arts and entertainment. In addition to a more recent focus on the Columbia, Mo. cultural scene. In 2012 and 2013, MOVE featured interviews with artists such as Passion Pit, Wilco, Ingrid Michaelson and The Wonder Years. Semester special editions have included coverage of Columbia's Treeline Music Festival (formerly known as Roots N Blues N BBQ) and the True/False Film Fest.

Prior to fall 2013, MOVE had been published as an insert within The Maneater, under its own style and design guidelines, with the eventual hope that it could develop into its own distinct publication. However, under the 2013-14 editorial board, MOVE replaced the Arts and Entertainment section of the newspaper and was integrated more uniformly with the rest of The Maneater. In the 2016–17 school year, MOVE set itself apart once again as the main student-run campus magazine. In 2023, MOVE Magazine remained a sub-publication of The Maneater and released a yearly, digital edition for two years. In 2025, the editorial board moved to re-printing the publication annually each spring. Now, MOVE Mag focuses on stories, recipes, and poems that fall under a new theme each year.

== Staff ==
Most staff members of The Maneater — including editors, writers, and visual creators — are undergraduate students at the University of Missouri, though graduate students are also eligible to work for the student publication. Each spring, the staff elects an editor-in-chief and managing editor to administer the publication in the coming year. The editor-in-chief runs with a campaign and opens applications for a managing editor shortly after being elected. Once a managing editor is selected, the pair then opens applications for editorial and business positions. The hired editors in turn appoint writers and visual creators to regularly cover recurring topics. The remainder of the staff varies in size. Anyone who has created content for the newspaper within the last three months is considered part of the active staff. The staff pitches stories to the editors or pick up general assignments as they come up. The Maneater welcomes students from all of the University of Missouri's schools and colleges, with or without prior journalism experience.

== Notable alumni ==
Maneater alumni have gone on to work in many of the nation's top newsrooms, including The Associated Press, The Los Angeles Times, The New York Times, USA Today and The Washington Post. Through donations from its alumni, The Maneater awards an annual merit-based scholarship to a member of its current staff.

- Betsey Bruce, veteran broadcaster
- Bryan Burrough, author and reporter
- Grant Barrett, lexicographer
- Pat Forde, Yahoo Sports columnist
- Ray Hartmann, The Riverfront Times founder
- Ron Powers, author and Pulitzer Prize-winner

== See also ==
- List of student newspapers
- List of National Newspaper Pacemaker winners

== Sources ==
- The Maneater - A Man-what?
- About The Maneater
