= Ventura Unified School District =

School district in Ventura County, California

Address
- 255 West Stanley Avenue, Suite 100 Ventura, California, 93001; United States

District information
- Grades: K–12
- Superintendent: Dr. Antonio Castro
- Schools: 27
- NCES District ID: 0640980

Students and staff
- Enrollment: 16,353
- Teachers: 685
- Student–teacher ratio: 23.87

Other information
- Website: Ventura Unified School District

The Ventura Unified School District (VUSD) is a school district headquartered in Ventura, California, United States. The district serves K–12 students in Ventura and surrounding unincorporated communities of Ventura County, including Saticoy, Casitas Springs, Oak View, and La Conchita. As of the 2019–20 school year, VUSD enrollment numbered 16,353 students.

== History ==
In November 2020, the Ventura Unified School District Board of Trustees voted to change the name of Blanche Reynolds Elementary School to Lemon Grove School effective with the 2020–21 school year. Members of the community demanded the school's name be dropped because Reynolds, a school superintendent in early 20th-century Ventura County, supported racial segregation in education. Accompanying this change will be the addition of middle school grades to the campus, becoming a TK–8 school.

== Schools ==
=== Elementary schools ===
- ATLAS Elementary TK-8 (Academy of Technology and Leadership at Saticoy; formerly Saticoy Elementary School)
- Blanche Reynolds Elementary School (will become Lemon Grove School, TK—8)
- Citrus Glen Elementary School
- E.P. Foster Elementary School
- Elmhurst Elementary School
- Homestead Elementary School
- Juanamaria Elementary School
- Junipero Serra Elementary School
- Lincoln Elementary School
- Loma Vista Elementary School
- Montalvo Elementary School
- Mound Elementary School
- Pierpont Elementary School
- Poinsettia Elementary School
- Portola Elementary School
- Sheridan Way Elementary School
- Sunset Elementary School and Middle School
- Will Rogers Elementary School

=== Middle schools ===
- Anacapa Middle School
- Balboa Middle School
- Cabrillo Middle school
- De Anza Academy of Technology and Arts (DATA)

=== K–8 schools ===
- Open Classroom
- Sunset Elementary and Middle School
- Atlas TK—8

=== High schools ===
- Buena High School
- Community Day School
- Foothill Technology High School
- El Camino High School at Ventura College
- Pacific High School
- Ventura High School

=== Adult school ===
- Ventura Adult and Continuing Education (VACE)

=== Former schools ===
The district previously operated Mar Vista Continuation High School.

== Transportation ==
Ventura Unified has a bus fleet of the following:

- Gen 3 Thomas Saf-T-Liner ER (John Deere CNG) (Bus 79)
- Gen 2 Thomas Saf-T-Liner HDX (John Deere CNG) (Bus 80-83)
- Gen 3 Thomas Saf-T-Liner HDX Diesel (Cummins L9) (Bus 21-26)
- Current-gen IC Bus RE300 with MaxxForce DT Diesel
- Current-gen IC Bus CE300 with MaxxForce DT Diesel
- Thomas Saf-T-Liner C2

=== Historical fleet ===
- Crown Supercoach 37 (Detroit Diesel 6-71)
- Crown Supercoach Series II 62,68,66,70,71 (Detroit Diesel 6V92TA)
