= Foothill Technology High School =

Coordinates: 34°16′41.40″N 119°13′36.66″W

Location
- 100 Day Road; Ventura, California 93003; United States

Information
- Type: Public magnet high school
- Established: 2000
- Principal: Courtney Johnson
- Faculty: 90
- Teaching staff: 8.12 (FTE)
- Enrollment: 981 (2018–19)
- Student to teacher ratio: 25.73
- Campus: Suburban
- Color
- Nickname: Dragons
- Newspaper: Foothill Dragon Press
- Website: foothilltechnology.org

Foothill Technology High School (FTHS, commonly known as Foothill Tech or simply Foothill) is a magnet high school in Ventura, California. The school is part of the Ventura Unified School District.

== History ==
Foothill Technology High School opened in 2000 to alleviate overcrowding at the city's two existing comprehensive high schools, Buena and Ventura. Admission is determined via lottery.

== Academics ==
Foothill Technology High School has been a California Distinguished School since 2005 and won the National Blue Ribbon Award in 2006 and 2012. In 2012 the school was ranked 78th in California and 419th in the U.S. by U.S. News & World Report.

Foothill Tech consistently ranks among the top high schools in California according to its Academic Performance Index (API) test scores. The school's API reached 896 in 2006, the 16th highest score among high schools in the state of California and the highest in Ventura County. FTHS scored 904 in 2007, then 899 in 2009 — yielding a #18 rank in the state. Foothill Tech's API increased to 906 in 2010. In 2011 FTHS retook the top spot in Ventura County with an API score of 914, beating Oak Park High School.

== Athletics ==
Foothill Technology High School athletic teams are nicknamed the Dragons. The school is a member of the CIF Southern Section (CIF-SS) and competes in the Tri-County Athletic Association. The school has offered interscholastic athletics since the 2014–15 academic year; prior to this, student-athletes competed for the comprehensive school within whose attendance boundaries they resided (Buena or Ventura).

Foothill Tech won back-to-back CIF-SS girls' cross country championships in 2017 and 2018. The FTHS boys' soccer team captured its first section title in 2020.

== Notable alumni ==
- Anderson .Paak (2004) Grammy-winning singer, songwriter, drummer, rapper, and record producer
- Ryan O'Connell (2005) Writer, actor, director, comedian, LGBTQ activist, and disability advocate.
- William Osman (2009) YouTuber and engineer
- Sebastian Bails (2018) Internet Personality
- John Robert Drake (2019) California Gubernatorial Candidate 2021
