= National Pacemaker Awards =

American journalism awards

The National Pacemaker Awards are awards for excellence in American student journalism, given annually since 1927. The awards are generally considered to be the highest national honors in their field, and are unofficially known as the "Pulitzer Prizes of student journalism".

The National Scholastic Press Association, headquartered in Minneapolis, Minnesota, administers the contest for high school programs, while the Associated Collegiate Press administers the college and university contests. Pacemakers are awarded annually at the JEA/NSPA National Conference (for high schools) and the ACP/CMA National College Media Convention (for colleges) in the following categories: Newspaper, Online, Yearbook/Magazine, and Broadcast.

== Newspaper Pacemakers ==
ACP, NSPA and the Newspaper Association of America Foundation have co-sponsored the Pacemaker competition since 1961. NSPA began the awards in 1927. The Pacemaker competition was discontinued in 1948–49, then resumed in 1961. The awards, which are considered by many to be the highest national honors for student journalism, are unique in their judging. Several issues from each newspaper's production schedule are randomly selected to be judged, ensuring that to be competitive for a Pacemaker, a publication must show consistent quality over an entire academic year.

Judges select Pacemaker Finalists and Pacemakers based on the following: coverage and content, quality of writing and reporting, leadership on the opinion page, evidence of in-depth reporting, design, photography, art and graphics.

Pacemakers are selected by the staff of a professional newspaper in the host city of the annual National College Media Convention, in the case of college papers, or the National High School Journalism Convention for high school publications. There are multiple awards in each category every year: in 2006, there were 26 high school winners.

== Online Pacemakers ==
This contest replaces the NSPA/ACP Best of the Net competition, which began in 1996. Member publication Web sites are not automatically entered in the Pacemaker competition; staffs must submit a Pacemaker entry form.

Online Pacemaker entries are judged during the months of February and March, based upon the following criteria: design, navigation, writing/editing, graphics and interactivity.

== Yearbook/Magazine Pacemakers ==
Yearbook/Magazine Pacemakers are judged based upon the following criteria: writing/editing, design, content, concept, photography, art and graphics.

In conjunction with the Yearbook Pacemaker competition, ACP/NSPA will recognize with an award of excellence the best interactive (CD/DVD) yearbooks in a separate contest. Interactive entries must include a copy of the printed book.

== Broadcast Pacemakers ==
The NSPA awards Broadcast Pacemaker awards for student-produced television news programs at high schools.

An entry consists of a student-produced news program or segment of a longer news program, on VHS format video tape. For the purposes of this competition, student-produced means that the majority of the planning, writing, scripting, taping and editing of the program was done by students.

This contest is unique to the high school level, as no similar award is offered by the ACP to college broadcast programs.

== Past winners ==
The following is a partial list of college and high school newspapers which have been awarded a National Pacemaker Award by the Associated Collegiate Press or National Scholastic Press Association, respectively.

=== College newspapers ===
- The Advocate (Contra Costa College) (1990, 1994, 1997, 1998, 1999, 2000, 2001, 2002, 2004, 2005, 2006, 2008, 2009, 2011)
- The Auburn Plainsman (Auburn University) (1967, 1968, 1972, 1973, 1974, 1975, 1976, 1980, 1982, 1983, 1988, 1989, 1991, 1993, 1994, 1995, 1997, 1999, 2000, 2001, 2002, 2003, 2005, 2012, 2014, 2016, 2017)
- The Baker Orange (Baker University) (2004)
- The Ball State Daily News (2019)
- The Battalion (Texas A&M University) (2008, 2019, 2022)
- The Cavalier Daily (University of Virginia) (1999)
- Central Michigan Life (Central Michigan University) (1975, 1976, 1978, 1979, 1989, 1990, 2001, 2002, 2005, 2007, 2010, 2013, 2014)
- The Chimes (Biola University) (2011)
- College Heights Herald (Western Kentucky University) (1981, 1982, 1984, 1988, 1992, 1998, 1999, 2000, 2002, 2003, 2005, 2009, 2010)
- Collegiate Times (Virginia Tech) (2007)
- The Commonwealth Times (Virginia Commonwealth University) (2019, 2020)
- The Crimson White (University of Alabama) (1977, 2015)
- The Daily Barometer (Oregon State University) (2017)
- Daily Bruin (University of California, Los Angeles) (1990, 2004, 2011, 2014, 2016, 2019)
- The Daily Collegian (Pennsylvania State University) (1985, 2012, 2013)
- The Daily Eastern News (Eastern Illinois University) (1983)
- The Daily Egyptian (Southern Illinois University, Carbondale) (2002)
- The Daily Emerald (University of Oregon) (2016, 2009, 1997, 1938)
- The Daily Forty-Niner (California State University, Long Beach) (1979)
- The Daily Iowan (University of Iowa) (2000, 2001, 2006, 2008, 2013, 2020)
- The Daily Nebraskan (University of Nebraska–Lincoln) (2004, 2005, 2006, 2007)
- The Daily Northwestern (Northwestern University) (1994, 2001, 2002, 2004, 2005, 2008, 2010)
- The Daily Orange (Syracuse University) (2014, 2015, 2016)
- The Daily Pennsylvanian (University of Pennsylvania) (1997, 1998, 2001, 2002, 2003, 2004, 2007, 2017, 2018)
- The Daily Reveille (Louisiana State University) (2003)
- The Daily Tar Heel (University of North Carolina at Chapel Hill) (1996, 1998, 2001, 2003, 2005, 2008, 2013)
- The Daily Texan (The University of Texas at Austin) (1965, 1969, 1971, 1985)
- The Daily of the University of Washington (University of Washington) (2010)
- District (Savannah College of Art and Design) (2004, 2008)
- El Don (Santa Ana College)
- The Eastern Echo (Eastern Michigan University) (1997, 1998)
- The Et Cetera (Eastfield College) (2011, 2014, 2017)
- The Flat Hat (College of William and Mary) (2007)
- FSView & Florida Flambeau (Florida State University) (2006, 2012, 2014)
- The Gettysburgian (Gettysburg College) (2000)
- The Graphic (Pepperdine University) (1989, 2019, 2020)
- The GW Hatchet (The George Washington University) (2005, 2008, 2011)
- The Harvard Crimson (Harvard University) (2002, 2004, 2007, 2008, 2013, 2022)
- The Hoya (Georgetown University) (1930, 2008)
- Indiana Daily Student (Indiana University) (1973, 1980, 1987, 1989, 1991, 1992, 1993, 1996, 1997, 1999, 2000, 2003, 2006, 2008, 2010, 2011, 2013, 2014, 2015, 2016, 2017, 2020, 2021, 2022, 2024, 2025)
- Iowa State Daily (Iowa State University) (2011, 2019)
- The Ithacan (Ithaca College) (1993, 1995, 2005, 2006, 2008)
- The Johns Hopkins News-Letter (Johns Hopkins University) (1995, 2003, 2005, 2007, 2015)
- The Kentucky Kernel (University of Kentucky) (2006, 2008, 2016)
- The Los Angeles Loyolan (Loyola Marymount University) (2007, 2011)
- The Lookout (Lansing Community College) (1992)
- The Maneater (University of Missouri) (1996, 1999, 2001, 2007)
- The Maroon (Loyola University New Orleans) (1983, 1986, 1998, 1999, 2006, 2015, 2021, 2022, 2024)
- Mars' Hill (Trinity Western University) (2008, 2010)
- The Mercury (University of Texas at Dallas) (2005, 2015, 2016)
- The Miami Hurricane (University of Miami) (1992, 2009)
- The Miscellany News (Vassar College) (1940, 1963)
- The Nevada Sagebrush (University of Nevada, Reno) (2008, 2009, 2011, 2015)
- The Northern Light (University of Alaska, Anchorage) (2009, 2011)
- Northern Star (Northern Illinois University) (2008)
- The Observer (Case Western Reserve University) (2000, 2004)
- The Oklahoma Daily (University of Oklahoma (1989, 1994, 1995, 2004)
- The Oracle (University of South Florida) (1967)
- The Orion (California State University, Chico) (1989, 1993, 1995, 1996, 1997, 1999, 2003, 2004, 2005, 2006, 2007, 2008, 2009, 2014)
- The Pendulum (Elon University) (2009)
- The Polaris (North Seattle Community College) (2006)
- The Red & Black (University of Georgia) (1935, 1937, 1941, 1972, 2010)
- The Reflector (University of Indianapolis) (2009)
- The Review (University of Delaware) (1993, 1997, 1999, 2000, 2001)
- Richland Chronicle (Richland College) (2000, 2001, 2007)
- The Sentinel (Kennesaw State University) (2004)
- The Sentinel (North Idaho College) (1991, 1994, 2002, 2008, 2009, 2010)
- The Shorthorn (University of Texas at Arlington) (2015, 2016, 2017, 2018, 2020)
- The State Hornet (California State University, Sacramento) (2000, 2017, 2026 x 2)
- The State News (Michigan State University) (1963, 1966, 1967, 1970, 1986, 1990, 1992, 1994, 1995, 1998, 2003, 2006, 2008, 2009)
- Student Life (Washington University in St. Louis) (2005, 2009, 2011)
- The Tartan (Carnegie Mellon University) (1989, 1994, 1995, 1999, 2007)
- The Technique (Georgia Tech) (2004)
- The Temple News (Temple University) (2006)
- The Triangle (Drexel University) (2004)
- The Tulane Hullabaloo (Tulane University) (1979, 1980, 1989, 1993, 1994, 1996, 2002, 2005, 2013, 2022)
- The University Daily Kansan (University of Kansas) (1971, 1993, 1994, 1995, 2000, 2004, 2005)
- Vanderbilt Hustler (Vanderbilt University) (2002, 2003, 2005, 2006)
- The Varsitarian (University of Santo Tomas) (2026)
- The Vermont Cynic (University of Vermont) (2011)
- The Volante (University of South Dakota) (1993, 1998, 2003, 2006, 2008)
- Washington Square News (New York University)

=== College magazines ===
- The American River Review (American River College) (2006, 2007, 2008, 2009, 2010)
- Alice (University of Alabama) (2016)
- Apricity Magazine (University of Texas at Austin) (2020)
- Ball Bearings (Ball State University) (2010, 2011)
- The Briar Cliff Review (Briar Cliff University) (1995, 2000)
- The Bridge (Bridgewater State College) (2006, 2011, 2012)
- Caltech Undergraduate Research Journal (California Institute of Technology) (2004, 2007)
- Cipher (Colorado College) (2012)
- The Collegian (South Dakota State University)
- Colonnades (Elon University) (2010)
- Currents (Pepperdine University) (2020)
- Emerge (University of Guelph-Humber) (2015)
- Flux (University of Oregon) (1996, 1997, 1998, 1999, 2000, 2001, 2002, 2004, 2007, 2009, 2010)
- Inside (Indiana University) (2011, 2012, 2013)
- Marr's Field Journal (The University of Alabama) (2009)
- Metrosphere (Metropolitan State College of Denver) (2011)
- The Point (Biola University) (2008)
- Rebel (East Carolina University) (1984, 1985, 1996, 1997, 1999, 2000, 2001, 2002, 2003, 2004, 2009, 2011)
- Reporter (Rochester Institute of Technology) (2011)
- Windhover (North Carolina State University) (1992, 1994, 1996, 1998, 1999, 2000, 2001, 2002, 2003, 2004, 2007, 2010, 2017)

=== College Online Pacemaker ===
- The Auburn Plainsman (Auburn University) (2004)
- The Badger Herald (University of Wisconsin–Madison) (2005, 2006)
- The Baylor Lariat (Baylor University) (2018, 2020, 2022, 2025)
- The Collegian (California State University, Fresno) (2007)
- CU Independent (University of Colorado Boulder) (2016)
- The Daily Tar Heel (University of North Carolina at Chapel Hill) (2005)
- El Don (Santa Ana College)
- Flux (University of Oregon) (2009, 2010)
- The Daily Collegian (Pennsylvania State University) (2008, 2013, 2017)
- The Daily Eastern News (Eastern Illinois University) (2008, 2009)
- The Daily Emerald (University of Oregon) (2025, 2023)
- The Daily Illini (University of Illinois Urbana–Champaign) (2010)
- The Daily Targum (Rutgers University) (2010)
- The Graphic (Pepperdine University) (2016, 2017, 2020)
- The GW Hatchet (The George Washington University) (2006, 2008, 2010)
- The Hoya (Georgetown University) (2003, 2005)
- Indiana Daily Student (Indiana University) (2000, 2001, 2002, 2004, 2010, 2020, 2021, 2022)
- Iowa State Daily (Iowa State University) (2006, 2009, 2011)
- The Maneater (University of Missouri) (2000, 2001, 2002, 2009, 2012)
- Mustang Daily/Mustang News (California Polytechnic State University, San Luis Obispo) (2007, 2010, 2014)
- North by Northwestern (Northwestern University) (2008)
- Northern Star (Northern Illinois University) (2002, 2003)
- The Observer (Fordham University) (2013)
- The Red & Black (University of Georgia) (2001, 2010)
- The Richland Chronicle (Richland College) (2007)
- The State News (Michigan State University) (2014)
- Student Life (Washington University in St. Louis) (2011)
- The Tartan (Carnegie Mellon University) (2002, 2006)
- The University Daily Kansan (University of Kansas) (2007, 2008, 2009)

=== Broadcast Pacemaker ===
- CHSTV (Carlsbad High School (Carlsbad, California)) (2017, 2019, 2020)
- Central Intelligence (Central High School (Springfield, Missouri)) (2009, 2010, 2011, 2012)
- Good Morning, Blue Valley (Blue Valley Unified School District, Overland Park, Kansas) (2000, 2001, 2002, 2003, 2004)
- Grady News Network (Henry W. Grady High School) (2005, 2010)
- HTV Magazine (Hillcrest High School (Springfield, Missouri)) (1996, 1997, 1998, 1999, 2000, 2001, 2002, 2003, 2004, 2008, 2010)
- KGLE 3 Teen News (Allen High School, Allen, Texas) (2000, 2002, 2003, 2004)
- School Zone (Highland Park High School) (2006)
- Tribe Talk (Wando High School, Mount Pleasant, South Carolina) (2014)
- Valley Buzz (McAllen High School) (1999)

=== High school newspapers ===
- The Andover Shield (Bloomfield Hills Andover High School) (2007)
- The Arapahoe Herald (Arapahoe High School) (2005, 2009)
- Blue & Gold (Findlay High School) (1999, 2002, 2008)
- The Bruin Voice (Bear Creek High School)
- The Call (Kirkwood High School) (2008, 2009)
- The Campanile (Palo Alto High School) (1996, 1997, 2001, 2004, 2021)
- The Central Times (Naperville Central High School) (1994, 1995, 1996, 1998, 1999, 2004, 2005, 2006, 2007, 2008, 2011)
- The Chronicle (Tom C. Clark High School) (2006)
- The Dispatch (James Bowie High School) (2018, 2019)
- Corinthian (Grace M. Davis High School) (2006)
- The Crane Clarion (Cranbrook Kingswood) (2007)
- The Crusader (Salpointe Catholic High School)
- Deerprints (Deerfield High School (Illinois)) (2006)
- The Echo (Neuqua Valley High School) (2008)
- The Echo (St. Louis Park High School) (2010)
- The Epic (Lynbrook High School) (1995, 2009)
- The Epitaph (Homestead High School) (1993)
- El Estoque (Monta Vista High School) (2007, 2008, 2009, 2011, 2013)
- The Exonian (Phillips Exeter Academy) (2007)
- The Falcon (Saratoga High School) (2014)
- The Falconer (Torrey Pines High School) (2010)
- The Gargoyle (University Laboratory High School) (2007)
- The Gazette (Granite Bay High School) (2000)
- The Green Raider (Ridley High School) (1998, 1999)
- The Grizzly Gazette (Granite Hills High School) (2007)
- The Hawk Tawk (Bozeman Senior High School) (1978)
- The High Tide (Redondo Union High School) (2011)
- Highlander (McLean High School) (2004, 2015, 2016, 2017)
- The HiLite (Carmel High School) (1992, 2012, 2014, 2015, 2016, 2017, 2018, 2019, 2020, 2021)
- JagWire (Emerald Ridge High School) (2006)
- The Kernal (East Bakersfield High School) (2006)
- The Lakewood Times (Lakewood High School) (2000, 2001)
- The Lion's Roar (Newton South High School) (2004)
- The Little Hawk (Iowa City High School) (1989, 1990, 1991, 1992, 1993, 1994, 1995, 1997, 1998, 1999, 2000, 2012)
- The Lowell (Lowell High School) (1993, 1996, 1998, 2000, 2001, 2002, 2003, 2006, 2012)
- The Nexus (Westview High School) (2003, 2008)
- The Octagon (Sacramento Country Day School) (2003, 2012)
- The Oracle (Troy High School) (2003)
- The Orange R (Roseburg Senior High School) (1983)
- The Phillipian (Phillips Academy) (2012)
- The Pilot's Log (Hasbrouck Heights High School) (2006, 2011)
- Prep News (Rockhurst High School) (2006)
- The Prospector (Cupertino High School) (2010, 2014)
- The Raven's Beak (Olathe Northwest High School) (2008)
- The Redwood Bark (Redwood High School) (2009, 2010)
- The ReMarker (St. Mark's School of Texas) (2005, 2009, 2011, 2013, 2015, 2016, 2017)
- The Review (St. John's School) (2015)
- The Rising Phoenix (William T. McFatter Technical High School) (2005)
- The Roosevelt News (Roosevelt High School) (2005)
- The Scroll (The American School in London) (2009)
- Silver Chips (Montgomery Blair High School) (2002, 2004, 2006, 2009)
- The Southerner (Henry W. Grady High School) (1997, 1998, 2003, 2004, 2005, 2006, 2008)
- The Spartana (Homestead High School) (1999, 2003, 2005, 2006, 2009)
- The Statesman (Woodrow Wilson High School) (1973, 1976, 1977, 1980, 1986)
- The Sunrise (Corona del Sol High School) (2007)
- The Surveyor (George Washington High School) (2007, 2008)
- tjTODAY (Thomas Jefferson High School for Science and Technology) (2007, 2009)
- The Tower (Grosse Pointe South High School) (2011)
- Tower (The Masters School) (2014)
- The Voice (Lakota West High School) (2000)
- The Winged Post (Harker School) (2008)

=== High School Online Pacemaker ===
- Bearing News (Rock Bridge High School) (2012, 2013, 2014, 2015, 2019)
- Blue & Gold Today (Findlay High School) (2010)
- The Boiling Point (Shalhevet High School) (2018)
- Clarion (Riverside Brookfield High School) (2010)
- The Communicator (Community High School) (2010)
- The Epic (Lynbrook High School) (2003)
- The Feather Online (Fresno Christian High School) (2006, 2008, 2010, 2012, 2013)
- The Foothill Dragon Press (Foothill Technology High School) (2010, 2011)
- JagWire (Emerald Ridge High School) (2002)
- The Knight Errant (St. Louis Park, Minnesota) (2009, 2010, 2011, 2012)
- The Lowell (Lowell High School) (2001, 2002, 2003, 2007, 2011, 2014)
- Oakton Outlook Online (Oakton High School) (2010)
- The Paly Voice (Palo Alto High School) (2004, 2005, 2006, 2007, 2008, 2012)
- Penn Points (Penn Manor High School) (2010)
- Scot Scoop News (Carlmont High School) (2014, 2017, 2018, 2020, 2023, 2024, 2025)
- Silver Chips Online (Montgomery Blair High School) (2004, 2005)
- The Uproar (Mansfield High School) (2010)
- Wayland Student Press Network (Wayland High School) (2008, 2009, 2010, 2011, 2013 2014, 2018,)

=== High school yearbooks ===
- Above & Beyond (Robinson Secondary School) (2003)
- Aegis (Lincoln-Way) (1994)
- Aerie (Brentwood School) (1997)
- Ambassador (Stevenson High School) (2002)
- American (Independence High School) (1993, 1994, 1995, 1996, 1997, 1998, 1999, 2000)
- Aquin (Saint Thomas High School) (2002, 2004)
- Arapahoe Calumet (Arapahoe High School) (2005)
- Arvadan (Arvada High School) (1999)
- Ash a Wut (Gabrielino High School) (2006, 2007)
- Aurora (John W. North High School) (2005)
- The Belltower (St. Thomas' Episcopal School, Houston, Texas) (2011, 2012)
- Beneath the Surface (Hooker High School) (2000)
- Bobcat (Brink Junior High School) (1996, 2001)
- Buccaneer (Pine Tree High School) (2005)
- Calumet (Arapahoe High School) (2006)
- Cayuse (Walnut High School) (2001, 2004, 2006, 2007, 2009)
- Ceniad (East Lansing High School) (1997, 1999, 2000, 2001, 2002, 2004, 2005, 2007)
- Chase (Chase County High School) (1998)
- Citadel (W.C. Overfelt High School) (1994, 1998, 1999, 2002)
- Clamo (Clayton High School) (1994, 1997, 1999, 2002)
- Cohiscan (Connersville High School) (2003, 2004)
- Copa de Oro (South Pasadena High School) (1993, 1994)
- Crest (Manchester High School North) (1997, 1999, 2000, 2001, 2002)
- Crimson & Blue (Abraham Lincoln High School) (1993)
- Crusader (Manchester High School) (2000, 2002, 2006)
- Cub Trax (Cupertino Junior High School) (1993, 1994, 1995, 1997)
- Decamhian (Del Campo High School) (1993, 1994, 1995, 1996, 2000, 2001, 2002, 2003, 2005, 2007)
- The Deer (Deer Park High School) (2004)
- Deka (Huntington North High School) (1995, 1996)
- Details (Whitney High School) (2006)
- Don’t Even Think About It (Hooker High School) (2003)
- Dragon (Lake Orion High School) (1998)
- The Dragon (Johnston High SChool) (2006)
- Ebb Tide (Carlson High School) (2003, 2004, 2005)
- The Edge (Glacier Peak High School) (2009)
- Epic (Center High School) (1997, 1999, 2000, 2001, 2002, 2003, 2004)
- Equus (Dobson High School) (1996, 1999, 2004)
- Escutcheon (Jane Addams Junior High School) (1994, 1995)
- Etruscan (Glenbrook South High School) (2002, 2003, 2004,2010,2011,2012)
- Eugenean (South Eugene High School) (1995)
- Eurekana (Eureka High School) (1998, 2003)
- Exposure (Scott County High School) (2000, 2001)
- Fentonian (Fenton High School (Michigan)) (2003, 2006, 2015)
- Finest Hours (Winston Churchill High School) (1993, 1996, 1997)
- Flashlight (Abilene High School) (1993, 1995, 2000)
- Freeflight (Torrey Pines High School) (2001)
- Golden Eagle (Cypress Falls High School) (2005)
- Golden Visions (Bonanza High School) (1998)
- Greyhound (Lyman High School) (1999)
- Hauberk (Shawnee Mission East High School) (1996, 1997, 1999, 2006, 2007)
- Hawk (Pleasant Grove High School) (2006)
- Helios (Sunny Hills High School) (2003)
- Heritage (Horizon High School) (1999)
- Hi-S-Potts (Pottsville High School) (1997)
- Highlander (Highland Park High School) (1996, 1998, 2003)
- Hoofbeats (Burges High School) (1998, 2001, 2002, 2004)
- Hooker (Hooker High School) (1999)
- Horizon (Blue Valley Northwest High School) (2004)
- Hornet (East Central High School) (1997)
- Indian (Shawnee Mission North High School) (1997, 2000, 2001, 2002, 2004, 2005, 2006, 2007)
- The JAG (Mill Valley High School) (2003, 2007, 2009)
- Key (Hanover Central High School) (1996, 2000, 2002)
- KLA-TA-WA (Snohomish High School) (2008)
- Lair (Shawnee Mission Northwest High School) (1993, 1994, 1995, 1996, 1998, 2000, 2001, 2002, 2003, 2005, 2007)
- Lance and Shield (Riverdale High School) (1994)
- El Leon (Mansfield High School) (2000, 2001, 2002)
- The Lion (McKinney High School) (2003)
- Little Things (Bay Village High School) (2003)
- El Lobo (Basic High School) (1998, 2000)
- Log (Columbus North High School) (2004, 2005, 2006)
- Logue (Northwood High School) (2006)
- Lone Star (James Bowie High School) (1993)
- Magician (Muncie Central High School) (2002)
- Make Fun of Bay (Bay Village High School) (2001)
- Maple Leaves (Fairmont High School) (1995)
- Marksmen (St. Mark's School of Texas) (2004, 2006)
- Maverick (McNeil High School) (2004)
- Las Memorias (Tascosa High School) (1996)
- Odyssey (Chantilly High School) (1995, 1998, 2001, 2002, 2003, 2004, 2005, 2007)
- Owensboroan (Owensboro High School) (1978, 1979, 1980, 1981)
- Pantera (Mead High School) (2018)
- Panther (Spring Hill High School) (2004)
- Panther Tale (Duncanville High School) (2002, 2003)
- Panther Tracks (Putnam City North High School) (1999)
- Paragon (Munster High School) (1994, 1995, 1996, 1998, 1999, 2001, 2002, 2005, 2006)
- Patriots’ Pride (Lake Brantley High School) (1996)
- Pegasus (Homestead High School) (2002, 2005)
- Pilot (Redondo Union High School) (2003, 2005, 2010, 2011)
- Pioneer (Kirkwood High School) (1993, 1994, 1995, 1996, 1997)
- Plan B (Bay High School) (2006)
- Quinault (Aberdeen High School) (2001, 2003, 2004, 2005)
- Rampages (Casa Roble High School) (1995, 1997, 1999, 2000, 2001, 2004, 2008, 2010, 2012)
- Red and Black (Lawrence High School) (1999)
- Reverie (Northwestern Lehigh High School) (2002)
- Roughneck (White Oak High School) (2003, 2006)
- Roundup (Great Falls High School) (2001)
- Rouser (Riverside Brookfield High School) (2001)
- Saga (Loudoun Valley High School) (1999, 2000, 2002, 2003, 2004)
- Scroll (Hoover High School) (1995)
- Shield (Robert E. Lee High School) (2001, 2003, 2005)
- Silvertip (Wichita Northwest High School) (2000, 2003)
- Sin Igual (Cerritos High School) (1995, 2000)
- So Anyway (Bay High School) (2004)
- Spirit (Seeger High School) (2005)
- The Stampede (J.W. Mitchell High School) (2005)
- Sunset (Corona del Sol High School) (1998, 2005)
- Talisman (Saratoga High School) (2003)
- Tiger (Jesuit High School) (1998)
- The Legend (El Dorado High School) (2019, 2020, 2022, 2023)
- The Tiger (Texas High School) (2004, 2006)
- Titanian (San Marino High School) (2012)
- Tom Tom (Danville Community High School) (2001, 2003, 2004)
- Tonitrus (Rocklin High School) (2006)
- Trail (Overland High School) (1998, 2000)
- Treasure Chest (Putnam City High School) (1995, 1996, 1999, 2000, 2001, 2004)
- Triune (Trinity High School) (2006)
- True Blue (Circle High School) (1993, 1995, 1996, 1999)
- Tukwet (Rancho Cucamonga High School) (1999)
- Valhalla (Lynbrook High School) (2008, 2010)
- Viking (Hoover High School) (2003)
- La Vista (Mountain View High School) (1997)
- Volsung (Downey High School) (1998, 1999, 2001, 2011)
- Westwind (West Henderson High School) (2004, 2005, 2006)
- Wings (Arrowhead Christian Academy) (1995, 1996, 1997, 1998, 1999, 2000, 2001, 2002, 2003, 2004, 2006, 2007, 2008, 2009, 2010, 2011, 2012, 2013, 2014, 2015)

=== High school newsmagazines ===
- The Communicator (Community High School, Ann Arbor, Michigan)
- Devils' Advocate (Hinsdale Central High School, Hinsdale, Illinois) (2013)
- Inkblots (The John Cooper School, The Woodlands, Texas) (2016)
- JagWire (Emerald Ridge High School, South Hill, Washington) (2006)
- The Lake (Standley Lake High School, Westminster, Colorado) (2014)
- The Muse (Dreyfoos School of the Arts, West Palm Beach, Florida) (2011, 2012)
- Orange and Black (Grand Junction High School, Grand Junction, Colorado) (2007)
- The Torch (John F. Kennedy High, Bloomington, Minnesota) (1979)
- The West Side Story (Iowa City West High School, Iowa City, Iowa) (2011)

== See also ==
- Critics and Awards Program for High School Students (journalism and theater)
