= The GW Hatchet =

Student newspaper of the George Washington University

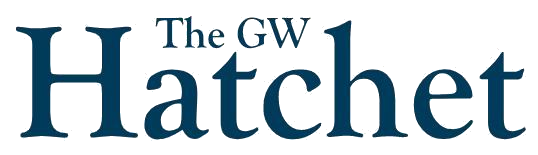
- Type: Student newspaper
- Format: Broadsheet
- Owner(s): Hatchet Publications, Inc.
- Editor-in-chief: Jenna Lee
- Founded: October 5, 1904; 121 years ago
- Headquarters: 609 21st Street N.W. Washington, D.C. 20052; United States
- Website: www.gwhatchet.com

The GW Hatchet is the student newspaper of George Washington University. Founded in 1904, The Hatchet is the second-oldest continuously running newspaper in Washington, D.C., only behind The Washington Post. The Hatchet is often ranked as one of the best college newspapers in the United States and has consistently won awards from the Society of Professional Journalists and from the Associated Collegiate Press. Alumni of the GW Hatchet include numerous Pulitzer Prize winners, Emmy Award winners, politicians, news anchors, and editors of major publications.

== History ==
=== 20th century ===
The paper derives its name from the story of U.S. President George Washington, a founding father, the nation's first president, and namesake of the university, involving his chopping down a cherry tree with a hatchet.

The first edition of The GW Hatchet was published on October 5, 1904.

In 1993, The GW Hatchet was incorporated as an independent 501(c)(3) non-profit, and the paper has been editorially and financially independent of the university since then. It is run by a board of directors composed of Hatchet editors, former staff members, a GW student, a GW professor and professionals in the media industry. Daily operations are overseen by the Editor-in-Chief. All business and editorial positions are filled by current GW students and the Editor-in-Chief serves as the corporation's president

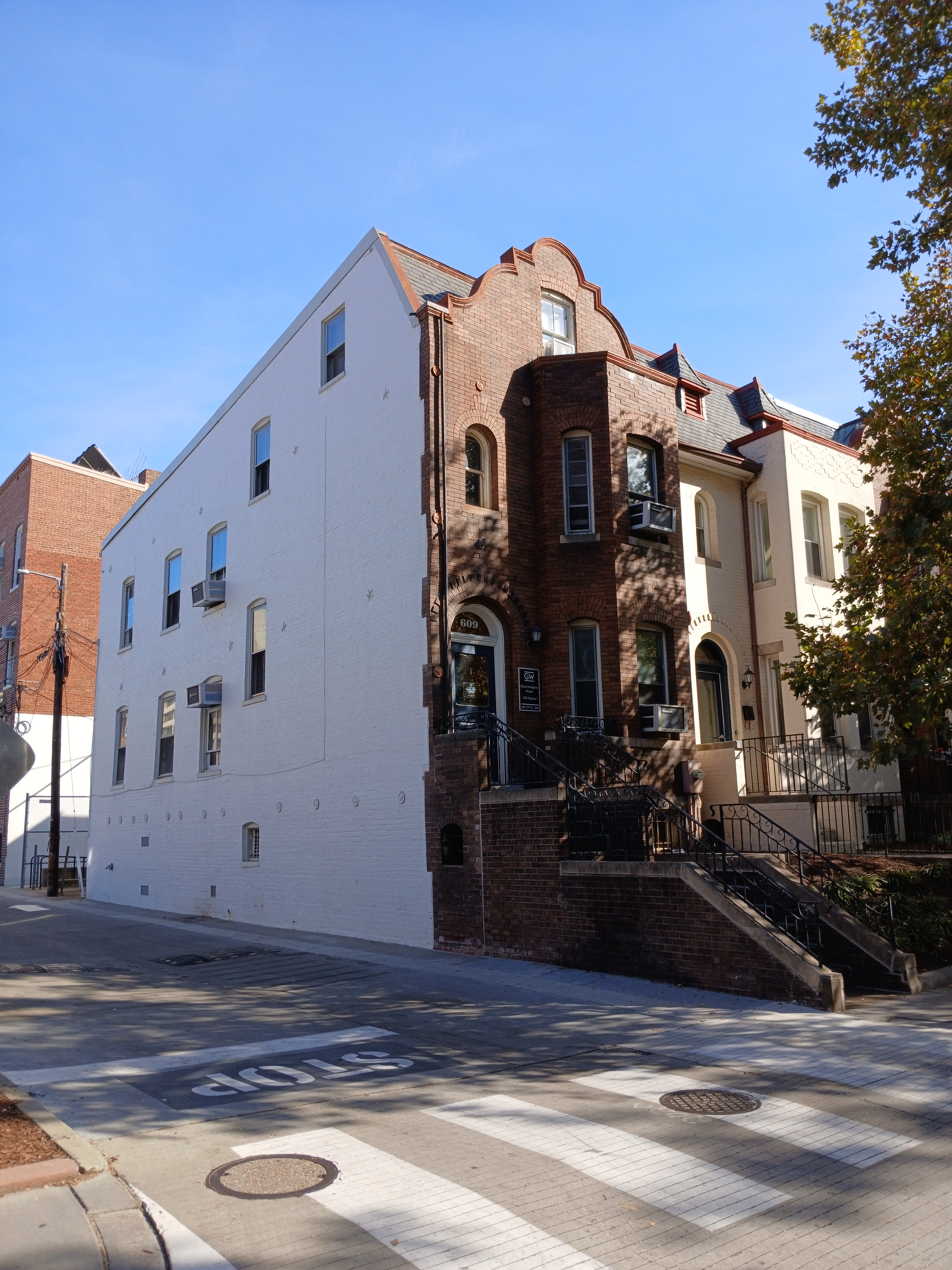
Current offices of The GW Hatchet, the "Hatchet House," in October 2024

In 1998, The Hatchet launched its website.

=== 21st century ===
The Hatchet has won awards, including a National Pacemaker Award in 2006 and 2010.

For many years, the university only charged the paper $1 in rent for their fully controlled townhouse in Washington, D.C., but began charging monthly rent at reduced rates as of 2006. In 2012, The Hatchet moved out of the university owned townhouse at 2140 G St. NW and into their own building at 2148 F St. NW. In 2017, The Hatchet sold the building on F St. and began renting from the university again at 609 21st St. NW, known as Davis-Hodgkins House.

In March 2015, the nonprofit real estate arm of The Hatchet sued the city of Washington, D.C., in D.C. Superior Court over a disputed property tax bill of $17,000, arguing that a request for a property tax exemption had been wrongfully denied (under D.C. law, schools, colleges and universities are exempt from property taxes). The city itself took the stance that neither The Hatchet nor its real estate arm qualify as educational organizations under D.C. law. As of December 2016 the lawsuit is still ongoing.

== Organization ==
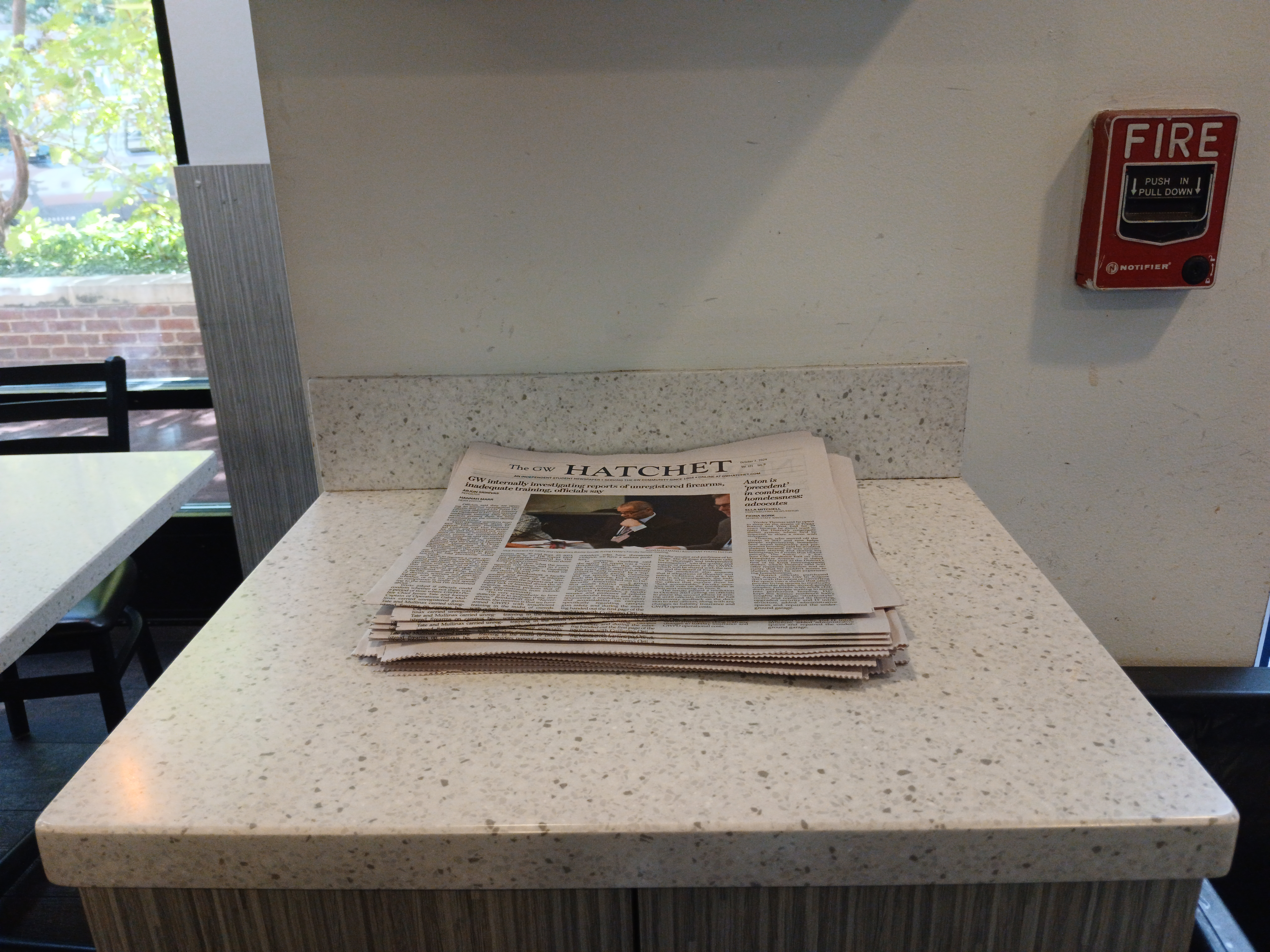
Stack of free copies of The GW Hatchet at Carvings Deli on the University campus

The newspaper is produced by Hatchet Publications, Inc., an independent, 501(c)(3) nonprofit corporation. The publication's mission statement is "to follow, educate, and inform members of The George Washington University and Foggy Bottom communities." It also serves as the newspaper of record for the university's archives.

The GW Hatchet publishes 2,500 copies every Monday throughout the school semesters and a special freshman orientation issue during the summer recess.

All issues of The Hatchet are accessible through the Special Collections Research Center at the Estelle and Melvin Gelman Library, located at 2130 H Street NW, Washington, D.C.

== Awards ==
The Hatchet has won numerous journalism awards, including:

- Society of Professional Journalists Finalist for Best All-Around Non-Daily Student Newspaper in the Nation and National Finalist for General Photography in 2011
- Society of Professional Journalists Mark of Excellence Award for Best All-Around Non-Daily Newspaper in the Nation in 2003, 2004 and 2007
- Society of Professional Journalists Mark of Excellence Award for Best All-Around Non-Daily Newspaper in the Region in 2003, 2004, 2005, 2006, 2007, 2008, 2009, 2011, and 2021
- Society of Professional Journalists Mark of Excellence Award for Spot News Reporting in 2003
- Society of Professional Journalists Regional Editorial Writing Award (first place), Regional Feature Photography Award (first place), Regional General News Photography Award (first place), Regional Best Affiliated Web Site (first place), and Regional Online Sports Reporting Award (third place) in 2011
- Society of Professional Journalists Regional Sports Photography Award (third place), Regional Editorial Writing Award (first place), Regional Sports Writing Award (second place)
- Society of Professional Journalists Regional Best Affiliated Web Site (first place) in 2010
- Society of Professional Journalists national finalist for sports writing in 2009 (Regional first-place winner), Regional Photo Illustration Award (third place), Regional Feature Writing Award (third place), Regional General Column Writing Award (first place), Regional Best Affiliated Website (second place), Regional Online Sports Reporting (second place) in 2009
- Society of Professional Journalists Regional Breaking News Reporting Award (second and third place), Regional Sports Writing Award (first and third place), Regional Editorial Writing Award (third place), Regional General Column Writing (first and third place), Regional Breaking News Photography Award (second and third place), Regional Online News Reporting Award (third place), Regional Online Feature Reporting (first place), Regional Online Sports Reporting Award (first place), Regional Best Affiliated Web Site (second place) in 2008
- Society of Professional Journalists National Finalist for Online Sports Reporting, and 18 Regional Awards in 2007
- Society of Professional Journalists National Finalist for General News Reporting, and 19 Regional Awards in 2006
- Society of Professional Journalists Mark of Excellence 13 regional awards in 2005
- Society of Professional Journalists National Finalist for Feature Writing, Best All-Around Daily Newspaper in the Nation in 2004
- Society of Professional Journalists Mark of Excellence 7 regional awards in 2002
- Society of Professional Journalists National Finalist Online Spot News Reporting and 13 Regional Awards in 2001
- Associated Collegiate Press National Newspaper Pacemaker Award in 2005, 2008 and 2011
- Associated Collegiate Press National Newspaper Pacemaker Award finalist in 2005, 2007, 2008 and 2011
- Associated Collegiate Press Online Pacemaker Award in 2006, 2008 and 2010
- Associated Collegiate Press Online Pacemaker Award finalist in 2006, 2007, 2008 and 2010
- Associated Collegiate Press Individual Awards: 2 in 2010 and 1 in 2011
- 15 SPJ Mark of Excellence regional awards, the most for any newspaper in the region, in 2009

== Notable alumni ==
Some notable Hatchet alumni include:

- Deborah Solomon, part of a Wall Street Journal team that won the 2002 Pulitzer Prize for Explanatory Reporting
- Mireya Navarro, part of a New York Times team that won the 2001 Pulitzer Prize for National Reporting
- Anders Gyllenhaal, vice president, news and Washington editor for The McClatchy Company and former chairman of the Pulitzer Prize Board
- Mark Schleifstein, winner of the 2006 Pulitzer Prize for Public Service and Pulitzer Prize for Breaking News Reporting and part of a New Orleans Times-Picayune team that won the 1997 Pulitzer Prize for Public Service
- Hadas Gold, European politics, media and global business reporter for CNN
- Diana B. Henriques, The New York Times reporter and winner of the 2004 Polk Award
- Joyce Brown and B.D. Colen, winners of the 1984 Pulitzer Prize for Local Reporting at New York Newsday
- Mark Olshaker, winner of a 1994 Emmy Award for Outstanding Animated Program and author of two The New York Times bestsellers
- Dick Polman, political columnist at The Philadelphia Inquirer
- David Holt, an Oklahoma State Senator and Mayor of Oklahoma City
- Mosheh Oinounou, executive producer of CBSN; senior producer for CBS News' CBS This Morning where he won a 2013 Emmy Award for Outstanding Investigative Journalism
- Jake Sherman, co-founder of Punchbowl News; former correspondent for Politico and MSNBC
- Jeremy Diamond, CNN political reporter
- Reena Ninan, former anchor for CBS News (CBSN and Saturday edition of CBS Weekend News)
- L. Ron Hubbard, founder of Scientology
