= Northern Star (Northern Illinois University) =

- “The truth shall bear all light”
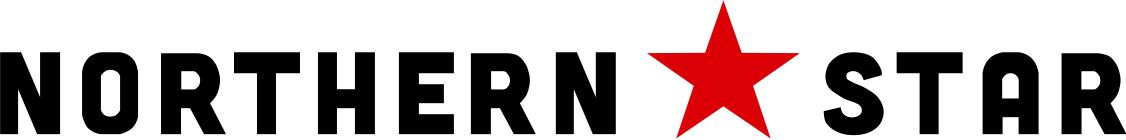

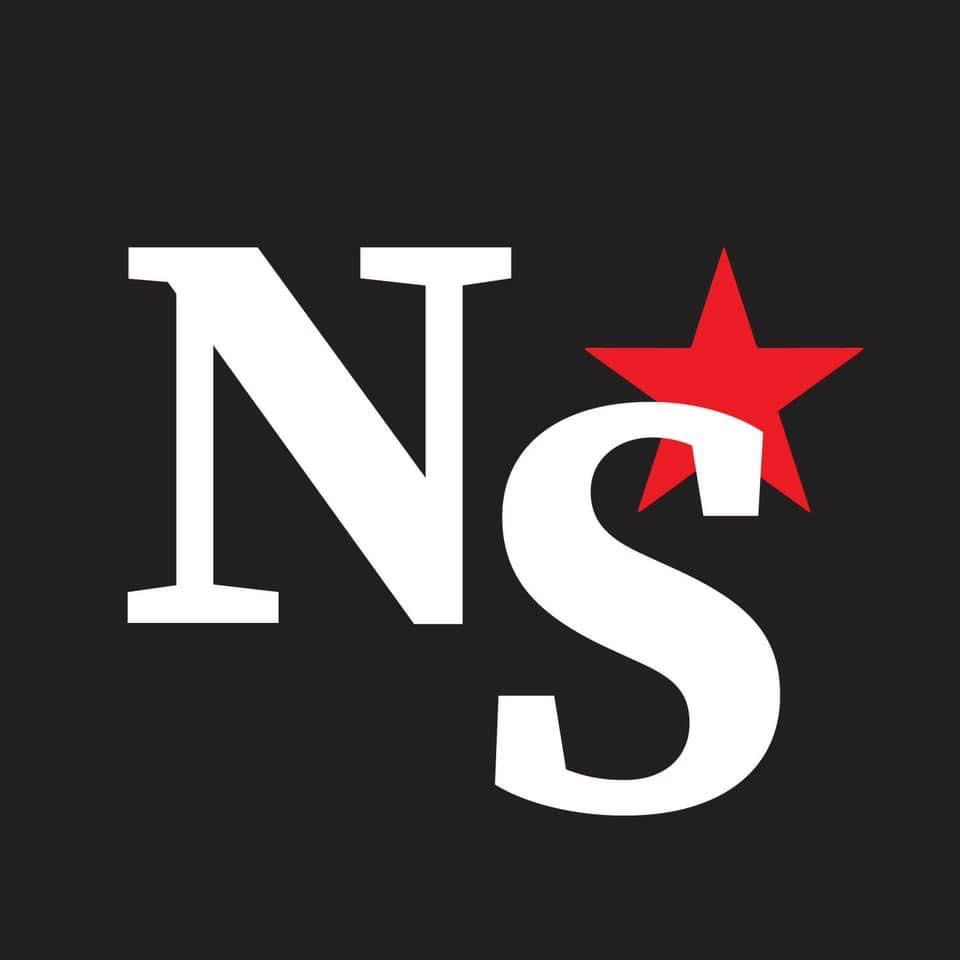
- Type: Student newspaper
- Format: Online newspaper
- School: Northern Illinois University
- Founded: 1899
- Headquarters: Peters Campus Life Building; Suite 130; DeKalb, Illinois 60115
- Website: www.northernstar.info

The Northern Star is the independent, student-produced daily news organization of Northern Illinois University (NIU) in DeKalb, Illinois, United States. The Northern Star covers NIU campus news, DeKalb city and county news, NIU sports and Northern Illinois entertainment.

== History ==
The newspaper has published continuously since 1899. It was originally called the Northern Illinois, until 1954 when it was renamed the Northern Star. The paper became a daily (Monday-Friday) in 1965. The Northern Star Online was launched in 1995.

After decades of daily print publication, the Northern Star transitioned to printing twice per week in January 2015.

As of 2022, the Northern Star is a predominantly digital news publication, only circulating special print issues four times per year.

== Publication and contents ==
The Northern Star provides online updates daily and produces a daily email newsletter, “TLDR,” as of 2021. TLDR consists of a selection of the organization’s top stories from the previous day and is published during the academic year. Exceptions to publication are holidays, semester breaks and exam periods.

The Northern Star is a member of the Associated Press, Associated Collegiate Press, College Newspaper Business and Advertising Managers, Illinois College Press Association, the DeKalb Chamber of Commerce, and several other professional journalism organizations.

== Structure and oversight ==
The Northern Star is governed by the Northern Star Publications Board.

The organization’s editors are overseen by the editor-in-chief, who is elected by the editorial board, with recommendation votes from the Northern Star Publication Board and democratic staff vote being taken into consideration, each semester. Second in command are the written managing and digital managing editors, who oversee written and digital staff respectively. The managing editors oversee the news, sports, lifestyle, opinion, photo, and video editors and each section’s content.

The Northern Star currently operates primarily on the work of volunteer staff, whose content is overseen by the paid editor roles. Scholarships are available to eligible staffers.

== Awards ==
The Northern Star honors its alumni with recognitions including a Hall of Fame, a Rising Stars award, Making A+ Difference awards and Star Innovators awards.

In 2008, for its coverage of the February Northern Illinois University shooting, the paper received a National Pacemaker Award.
