= The Auburn Plainsman =

Newspaper in Auburn, Alabama

- "A spirit that is not afraid"
- Type: Student newspaper
- Format: Tabloid, online
- School: Auburn University
- Editor-in-chief: Amanda Machamer
- Founded: 1893
- Language: English
- Headquarters: Suite 1111; 255 Heisman Drive; Auburn, Alabama 36849-5343
- ISSN: 1071-1279
- OCLC number: 232118815
- Website: theplainsman.com

The Auburn Plainsman is the student-run news organization for Auburn University in Auburn, Alabama. It has notably received awards for excellence from the Associated Collegiate Press and is the most decorated non-weekly print student publication in the history of the National Pacemaker competition.

As of February 2021, the Plainsman is primarily an online publication, updating its website daily with articles, photographs and weekly podcasts. The Plainsman prints four to six special editions each year which are freely distributed throughout the campus and surrounding cities of Auburn and Opelika.

The editor-in-chief is selected by the Auburn University Communications Board, a group of faculty, students and professional journalists. In turn, the editor hires a paid and volunteer staff to run the paper. The Plainsman currently has a staff exceeding 80 paid and volunteer student-journalists.

The Plainsman is a self-supported publication and receives no regular student or state taxpayer revenue. The Plainsman is primarily composed of five different sections: news, sports, lifestyle, opinion, and multimedia.

== History ==
Founded by the school's two literary societies, the Wirts and Websterians, students began publishing a newspaper for the Agricultural and Mechanical College of Alabama in 1893. The students called it the Orange and Blue after the colors worn by the football team formed a year earlier.

The paper began as a twice-monthly publication. Through its early years, the paper was small. It resembled other newspapers of the day. The first major change in the paper's traditional production came in 1922, when the name went from the Orange and Blue to The Auburn Plainsman. Name changes since then were minor, as editors have dropped and picked up the word "Auburn," but the word became a permanent fixture in the title in 1961-62, a year after the Alabama Legislature changed the school's name for the final time, from Alabama Polytechnic Institute to Auburn University.

Aside from the paper's name change, the frequency of publication has shifted. It went from one edition per week to two editions per week in the fall of 1928. The Plainsman returned to a weekly publication schedule some time in the late 1940s.

The first female editor was Shirley Smith, in 1943. She was followed by Martha Rand, in 1944 and then by Mimi Simms. Since Rand and Simms, only 10 women have served as editor.

The paper launched its online presence in early 1997 with only selected articles placed on a university-based website. In fall 1997, the first online editor, Karl Sebelius, moved the paper to its current online home at theplainsman.com. The online edition has received three Online Pacemakers.

The 2000–01 editor, Rachel Davis, lobbied the Board of Communications (Comm Board), a university committee charged with overseeing student media such as the Plainsman and student radio station WEGL, for a change in how Plainsman editors were chosen. The long-standing tradition of election by the student body was abandoned. Now, the Comm Board and its special advisory board select the editor, who takes a series of tests before interviewing for the job.

In February 2021, editor Jack West moved The Plainsman to its current format as a primarily online publication, citing printing costs and the general trend of the journalism industry as reasons for the change. In an editorial announcing the change, West noted to readers, the vast majority of which accessed The Plainsman's content online, "Ironically, for most of you reading this, there won't be a huge amount of change."

In recent years, Plainsman stories have been picked up by almost every national major media outlet, including stories covering a triple homicide at an off-campus apartment complex, the confession of Toomer's Tree poisoner Harvey Updyke and the theft of more than 1,000 copies of The Plainsman by members of Auburn SGA. These stories were picked up by organizations such as AP, ESPN, NBC, ABC, FOX, CNN and more.

== Awards ==
One of collegiate journalism's highest prizes is the National Pacemaker Awards, handed out since 1928 by the Associated Collegiate Press. The Auburn Plainsman is the most decorated student publication in the competition.

- The Auburn Plainsman's Pacemakers:
  - 2020–2021, Pacemaker Finalist, Jack West, editor
  - 2019–2020, Online Pacemaker, Eduardo Medina, editor
  - 2018–19, National Pacemaker, Chip Brownlee, editor
  - 2018–19, Online Pacemaker Finalist, Chip Brownlee, editor
  - 2017–18, Pacemaker Finalist, Chip Brownlee, editor
  - 2017–18, Online Pacemaker, Chip Brownlee, editor
  - 2016–17, National Pacemaker, Corey Williams, editor
  - 2015–16, Pacemaker Finalist, Jim Little, editor
  - 2013–14, National Pacemaker, Kelsey Davis, editor
  - 2011–12, National Pacemaker, Miranda Dollarhide, editor
  - 2004–05, National Pacemaker, James Diffee, editor
  - 2003–04, Online Pacemaker, David Mackey, online editor
  - 2002–03, National Pacemaker, Adam Jones, editor
  - 2001–02, National Pacemaker, Napo Monasterio, editor
  - 2000–01, National Pacemaker, Rachel Davis, editor
  - 1999–00, National Pacemaker, Bill Barrow, editor
  - 1998–99, National Pacemaker, Lee Davidson, editor
  - 1996–97, National Pacemaker, Greg Walker, editor
  - 1994–95, National Pacemaker, Jan Clifford, editor
  - 1993–94, National Pacemaker, Tom Strother, editor
  - 1992–93, Pacemaker Finalist, Seth Blomeley, editor
  - 1990–91, Regional Pacemaker, Wade Williams, editor
  - 1988–89, Regional Pacemaker, David Sharp, editor
  - 1987–88, Regional Pacemaker, Bret Pippen, editor
  - 1982–83, Regional Pacemaker, Tim Dorsey, editor
  - 1981–82, Regional Pacemaker, Steve Parish, editor
  - 1979–80, National Pacemaker, Rick Harmon, editor
  - 1975–76, National Pacemaker, Steele Holman, editor
  - 1974–75, National Pacemaker, Rheta Grimsley Johnson, editor
  - 1973–74, National Pacemaker, Bill Wood, editor
  - 1972–73, National Pacemaker, Thorn Botsford, editor
  - 1971–72, National Pacemaker, John Samford, editor
  - 1967–68, National Pacemaker, Bruce Nichols, editor
  - 1966–67, National Pacemaker, Jerry Brown, editor

In 2022, The Auburn Plainsman was recorded as having 205,232 total social media shares, making it the 9th most shared student-run newspaper in the U.S. The publication had an average of 171 shares per article that same year.

=== 2018 Better Newspaper Contest – Alabama Press Association ===
Year	Award	Place	Recipient
2018	Best Spot News Story	1st	Chip Brownlee
2018	Best Editorial Column or Commentary	1st	The Auburn Plainsman
2018	Best Spot News Photo	1st	Matthew Bishop
