= Fordham Observer =

The Observer
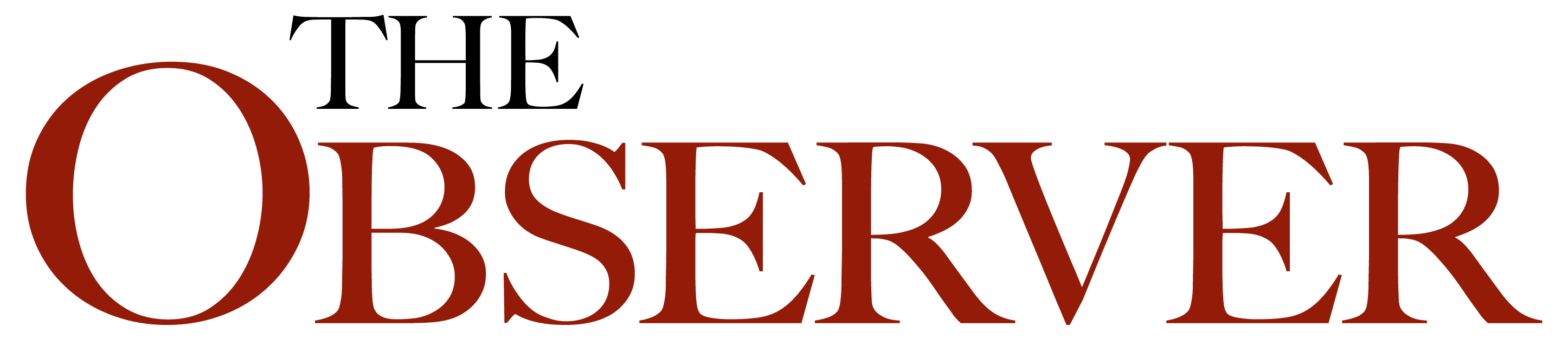

- Cover of The Observer (January 24, 2019), highlighting the impact of the federal government shutdown on students.
- Type: Bi-weekly student newspaper
- Format: Berliner
- Founded: 1981; 45 years ago
- Headquarters: 113 W. 62nd Street, New York, NY 10023
- Circulation: 2,000
- Website: www.fordhamobserver.com
- Free online archives: Archives

The Observer is the student newspaper of the Lincoln Center campus of Fordham University.

It is published in print bi-weekly when the university is in session by a staff of more than 50 students. Content is also published online on a more frequent basis. Based at Fordham University's Lincoln Center campus in Manhattan, The Observer’s circulation also reaches Fordham’s Rose Hill campus in the Bronx, making it available to all students in the university’s undergraduate colleges and graduate schools.

== History ==
The first copy of the newspaper was published in November of 1981. Mitch Berger served as the founding editor-in-chief of the newspaper, and its inaugural advisor was Dr. Elizabeth Stone.

The Observer is Lincoln Center’s fourth student-run newspaper. The first was The Curved Horn that was brought over from Rose Hill when the Lincoln Center campus was established in 1968. Two other papers, The Review and Evex were started up. By 1981, all three had folded, and The Observer emerged as the school's sole student publication. In 2016 the Communication and Media Studies department, which originally housed the newspaper, chose to remove all financial and curricular support from The Observer. This action led to an alumni campaign, a "Save The Observer" Facebook page and a letter signed by 115 alumni protesting the decision, which was seen as sudden and harmful to the diversity within the newspaper. As of 2022, The Observer has club status and is housed within the Office for Student Involvement.

== Notable alumni ==
- Jane McGonigal, American game designer and author
- Naima Coster, Pushcart Prize-nominee who contributed essays to The Observer, and whose debut novel "Halsey Street" was originally excerpted in the publication
- John Cummings, Republican candidate for the House of Representatives who unsuccessfully ran against Alexandria Ocasio-Cortez in the 2020 general elections and wrote sports articles for The Observer

== Awards ==
In 2019, The Observer won the First Place award in the Best of Show category from the Associated Collegiate Press for a less-than-weekly newspaper at a four year school.

The Observer won a College Online Pacemaker award from the ACP in 2013 and 2020, and was a finalist in 2010 and 2012. It was ranked as the eighth best college newspaper in the country, along with The Fordham Ram, in 2015 by the Princeton Review (The Review does not specify the publication, only the school). In 2021, The Observer was listed as a "Great College Newspaper," again along with The Fordham Ram by the Princeton Review.

The paper has in the past decade won numerous awards, including more than a dozen "story of the year" awards in several categories from the New York Press Association Better Newspaper contest and the American Scholastic Press Association.
