= The University Daily Kansan =

Student newspaper of the University of Kansas

University Daily Kansan
- Type: Student newspaper
- Format: Broadsheet
- Owner: Self owned
- Founded: 1904
- Headquarters: Lawrence, Kansas, United States
- Website: kansan.com

The University Daily Kansan is an editorially independent student newspaper serving the University of Kansas. It was founded in 1904. Its print distribution was only within the university's campus, as well as student apartment complexes throughout Lawrence. It was originally published Monday through Friday, then later weekly during the school year, except fall break, spring break, and exams; and weekly during the summer session, excluding holidays. Its circulation is about 12,000. The Kansan used to include a weekly lifestyle magazine, the Jayplay.

Its online counterpart, Kansan.com, began operation in late 1996. Originally called the UDKi (for interactive) it adopted the name of its parent publication three years later.

The newspaper earned the Newspaper Pacemaker award from the Associated Collegiate Press in 1993, 1994, 1995, 2000, 2004 and 2005. It was a finalist for the award in 2001 and 2007. Kansan.com, the newspaper's online counterpart, won the Online Pacemaker in 2007, 2008 and 2009.

Grant Snider was a cartoonist for the Daily Kansan as an undergraduate.

The University Daily Kansan stopped publishing regular print editions in 2020 due to the COVID-19 pandemic and removed the paper's circulation boxes on campus.
