= Collegiate Times =

Student newspaper of Virginia Tech

- The April 17, 2007 front page of the Collegiate Times reporting the Virginia Tech shooting
- Type: Student newspaper
- Format: Tab
- Owner: Independent
- Founded: 1903
- Language: English
- Headquarters: Blacksburg, Virginia
- Circulation: 5,000
- Price: First copy free; 50 cents each subsequent copy
- Website: www.collegiatetimes.com

The Collegiate Times is an independent, student-run newspaper serving Virginia Tech since 1903. The Educational Media Company at Virginia Tech (EMCVT), a non-profit student media consortium, owns the publication. Based in Blacksburg, Virginia, the Collegiate Times publishes local news, sports, features and opinions for 5,000 print readers every Tuesday of the academic year and prints its summer edition, Hello Hokies, annually. The Collegiate Times represents the only daily newspaper produced in Blacksburg and also provides its content online via its website, mobile app, and various social media outlets.

== History ==
=== Early origins ===
In 1903, the Athletic Association at Virginia Agricultural and Mechanical College created The Virginia Tech, a university-sponsored publication under the presidency of John Williamson and Tyler Jimenez that eventually became the Collegiate Times. By the 1960s, when the university's board of visitors accepted "Virginia Tech" as an official and popular usage of the school name, the editorial board at The Virginia Tech opted to change the paper's name to the Collegiate Times, to avoid any confusion between the student publication and the university proper.

In 1979, the Collegiate Times stopped receiving funding from the University and became completely self-supported.

=== Recent developments ===
Currently, the Collegiate Times includes four sections: news, sports, opinions, and lifestyles. Content typically includes information relevant to Virginia Tech's Blacksburg campus and the surrounding area. Online, the Collegiate Times has made available several public databases that include public information pertaining to grades in Virginia Tech courses and salaries of public officials.

The Virginia Press Association awarded the Collegiate Times 20 journalism honors for its reporting, production and photography in 2008.

The Collegiate Times was awarded the 2007 National Pacemaker and a 2008 Online Pacemaker by the Associated Collegiate Press based on the student paper's dedication to "coverage and content, quality of writing and reporting, leadership on the opinion page, evidence of in-depth reporting, design, photography, art and graphics."

The Collegiate Times staff member Caleb Fleming was awarded first place for the 2009 National College Reporter of the Year award, presented by the Associated Collegiate Press.

The website for the Collegiate Times has won a number of awards, including an Associated Collegiate Press Online Pacemaker Finalist Award in 2012 and was named to College Media Matters top 50 college media websites list in 2013.

In 2013, the Collegiate Times released a mobile app, available for free on Android and iOS systems.

=== Virginia Tech massacre coverage ===
The newspaper was the first media outlet to break news on the Virginia Tech massacre, starting online coverage at 9:47 a.m. the day of the shootings (April 16, 2007). The publication received international attention from media outlets around the world, which included The New York Times' home page linking to the student paper's list of confirmed deceased.

The April 17 edition of the Collegiate Times provided a detailed, illustrated timeline of the massacre. In the days following, the newspaper provided extensive coverage of events from the student community's perspective, along with disseminating information about the various on-campus memorials and support resources intended to assist the students in their recovery.

=== Yeagle v. Collegiate Times ===
In 1996, the Collegiate Times was sued for defamation by an assistant to the VP of Student Affairs at Virginia Tech, Sharon D. Yeagle. In the print edition of the paper, Yeagle was referred to as the "Director of Butt Licking" in the attribution of a blockquote; in the filed suit, it was argued that the printed title alleged that Yeagle violated Virginia anti-sodomy law. The case was dismissed by the trial court, however the Supreme Court of Virginia elected to hear a limited appeal in 1998. The Supreme Court decided in favor of the Collegiate Times, stating "the phrase 'Director of Butt Licking' is no more than 'rhetorical hyperbole.' The phrase is disgusting, offensive, and in extremely bad taste, but it cannot reasonably be understood as stating an actual fact about Yeagle's job title or her conduct, or that she committed a crime of moral turpitude."

== Awards ==
The Collegiate Times has won numerous journalism awards, including:

- Associated Collegiate Press National Newspaper Pacemaker Award in 2007
- Associated Collegiate Press National Newspaper Pacemaker Award finalist in 2007
- Associated Collegiate Press Online Pacemaker Award in 2008
- Associated Collegiate Press Online Pacemaker Award finalist in 2008, 2009, 2011 and 2012
- College Media Advisors Best of Collegiate Design Award in 2008
- Columbia Scholastic Press Association Gold Circle Newspaper Award – News Writing in 2008
- Virginia Press Association First Amendment Award in 2009

== See also ==
- WUVT
- The Educational Media Company at Virginia Tech
