= North by Northwest (disambiguation) =

North by Northwest is a 1959 American spy thriller film directed by Alfred Hitchcock and starring Cary Grant, Eva Marie Saint and James Mason.

North by Northwest may also refer to:

- Northwest by north, one of the "quarter-winds" on a compass.
- North by Northwest, a 1982 album by Tom Robinson
- North by Northwestern, a daily online news magazine at Northwestern University, Illinois, US
- North by Northeast
