= Educational Media Company at Virginia Tech =

Educational Media Company at Virginia Tech, Inc.
- Company type: Nonprofit Corporation
- Founded: 1997; 29 years ago in Blacksburg, Virginia, United States
- Divisions: Bugle; Collegiate Times; Silhouette; VTTV; WUVT-FM
- Website: www.collegemedia.com

The Educational Media Company at Virginia Tech, Inc. (EMCVT) is an independent governing body over student mass media organizations of the Virginia Tech campus. The EMCVT board of directors is made up of Virginia Tech faculty and staff, students, and members of the Blacksburg, Virginia community. As the parent company, EMCVT owns the copyrights on all media produced by its divisions.

== Divisions ==
- Bugle yearbook
- Collegiate Times newspaper
- Silhouette literary magazine
- VTTV television
- WUVT-FM radio

== Controversy ==
In 2003, the structure of the EMCVT was called into question by Virginia House of Delegates member Robert G. Marshall as a result of content he found objectionable on the program Sex Talk Live aired on VTTV. Marshall called for university officials to provide more oversight over student media on campus. Virginia Tech President Charles Steger responded that he "approached the idea of prior restraint (of student media) with uneasy caution" and the matter was dropped.

In 2015, the editor in chief of the Collegiate Times, Erica Corder, was fired while pursuing a story about EMCVT's finances. This led to the resignation of the assistant editor of the paper. Increased scrutiny on the finances of EMCVT eventually led to the termination of two professional staffers of the company, and to the resignation of the EMCVT General Manager.
