= Pacific High School (Ventura, California) =

Location
- 501 College Dr; Ventura 93003, California; United States; 34.2682°N 119.24224°W

Information
- Principal: Deidre Monarres
- Teaching staff: 15.87 (FTE)
- Grades: 10 – 12
- Enrollment: 198 (2023–2024)
- Student to teacher ratio: 12.48
- Website: http://www.venturausd.org/pacific/

Pacific High School is a public continuation high school in the Ventura Unified School District located in Ventura, California.
