= Ventura High School =

Public school in Ventura County, southern California

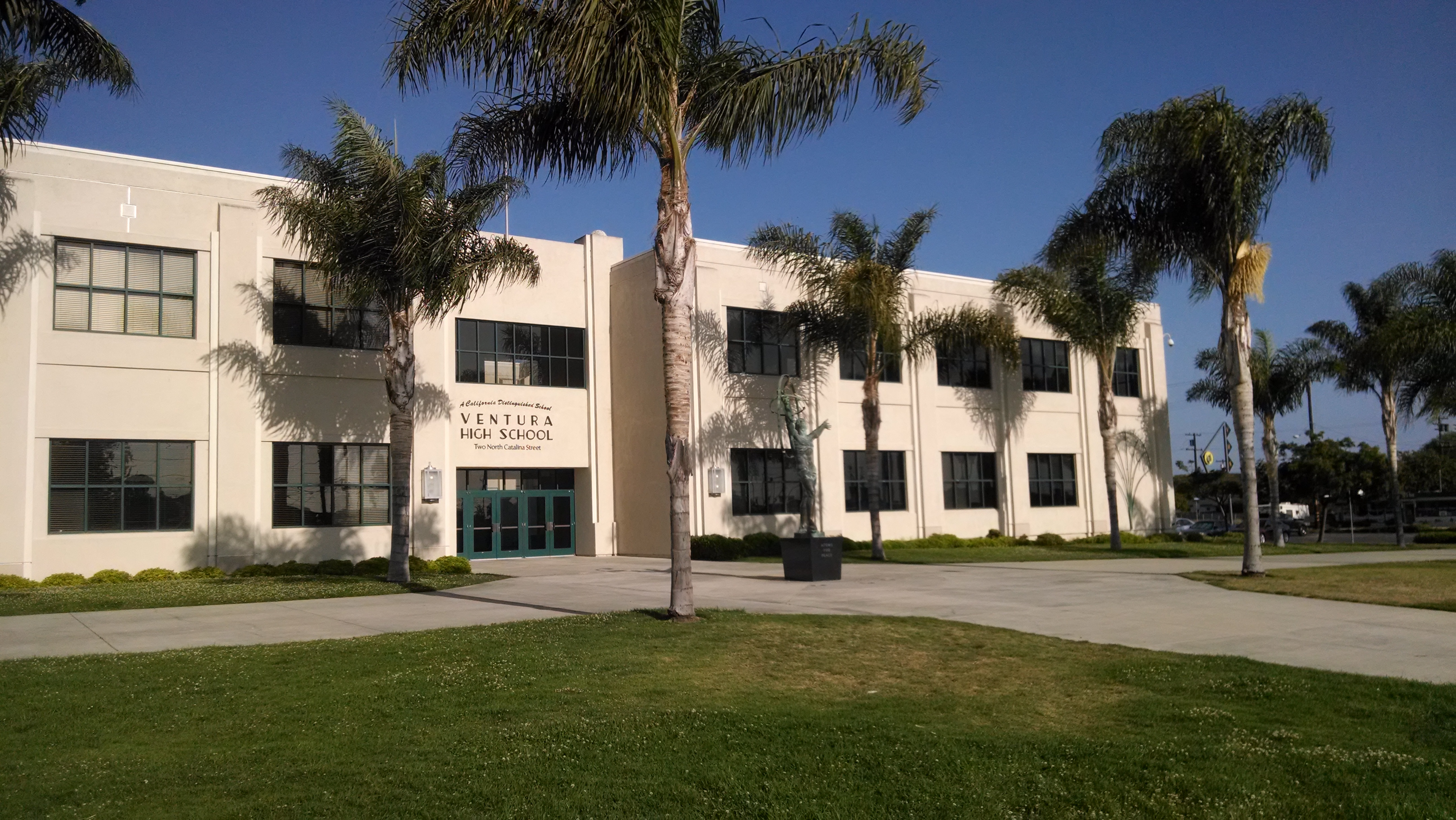
- Entrance facing Catalina Street, showing the Atoms for Peace statue

Location
- 2 North Catalina Street; Ventura, California 93001; United States; 34°16′42″N 119°16′06″W

Information
- Type: Public
- Established: 1889
- Principal: Marissa Rodriguez
- Faculty: 95
- Teaching staff: 83.39 (FTE)
- Enrollment: 2,036 (2023–2024)
- Student to teacher ratio: 24.42
- Campus: Mid-size city
- Color
- Fight song: Black&Yellow
- Athletics conference: CIF Southern Section; Channel League
- Mascot: "Cougie"
- Nickname: Cougars
- Rival: Buena High School
- Newspaper: The Cougar Press
- Website: ww2.venturausd.org/ventura/home.aspx

Ventura High School (VHS) is a public high school in Ventura, California. The school is part of the Ventura Unified School District. It serves students in the western portion of Ventura and surrounding unincorporated communities, including Casitas Springs, Oak View, and La Conchita. VHS is a California Distinguished School.

== History ==
Ventura High School was established in 1889. The current Ventura High School was completed in 1930, and its 1,200-seat Auditorium was added in 1939.

In 2012, Sebastien DeClerck, a French and Italian language teacher at VHS, was honored as a California Teacher of the Year for 2013.

In the 1960s, the school adopted the “Cougar” mascot and black & orange as its colors—emblems tied to Ventura’s heritage in citrus farming and the petroleum industry.

Over time, VHS also shared space and functions with Ventura College, as the high school once included a junior college component; in 1982, it separated into a dedicated senior high school serving grades 9–12.

== Music ==
Ventura High's music department has an Instrumental Jazz Ensemble, a Vocal Jazz Ensemble, a Wind Ensemble, an Honors Wind Ensemble, a String Orchestra, a Global String Ensemble, and a pep band that is open to all music students and plays at sporting events. The Vocal Jazz Ensemble was added in the 2018–2019 school year and consists of members of the Instrumental Jazz Ensemble and vocalists from all around the school. Both the Wind Ensemble and String Orchestra earned distinction nationwide at invitational music festivals in Boston, New York, Hawaii, and most recently in 2015 at the NAI Invitational Festival in Chicago, in which both groups won first place gold superior in their divisions and the String Orchestra won the entire competition.

The Global String Ensemble is an intermediate-level orchestra that performs basic high school string ensemble repertoire as well as traditional Mariachi ensemble repertoire. The department also has an Honors String Quartet chosen every year, earning distinction nationwide at District, Regional, and State Festivals. In the 2014–2015 school year, the school reestablished a Ventura Unified School District Youth Symphony.

== Athletics ==
Ventura High School athletic teams are nicknamed the Cougars. The school competes in the Pacific View League, a CIF Southern Section conference which the school joined in 2018. Before this, VHS was a long-time member of the Channel League. The school has 21 teams competing at the varsity level. Ventura's primary rival is Buena High School in east Ventura. As of the 2025-26 academic year, Teri Dath is the athletic director.

Larrabee Stadium, located on the north end of the campus and overlooking the city, is named for alum Mike Larrabee. The football field within the stadium is named for alum Eric "E-Rock" Turner. The gymnasium is named for former coach Bob Tuttle.

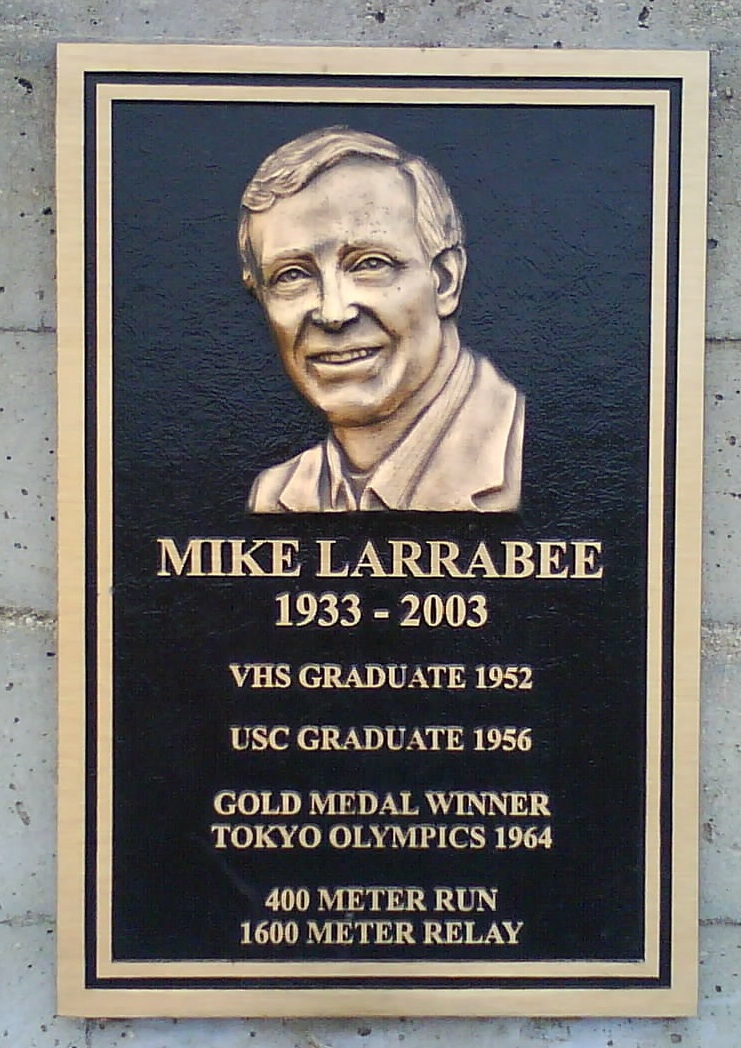
Mike Larrabee plaque

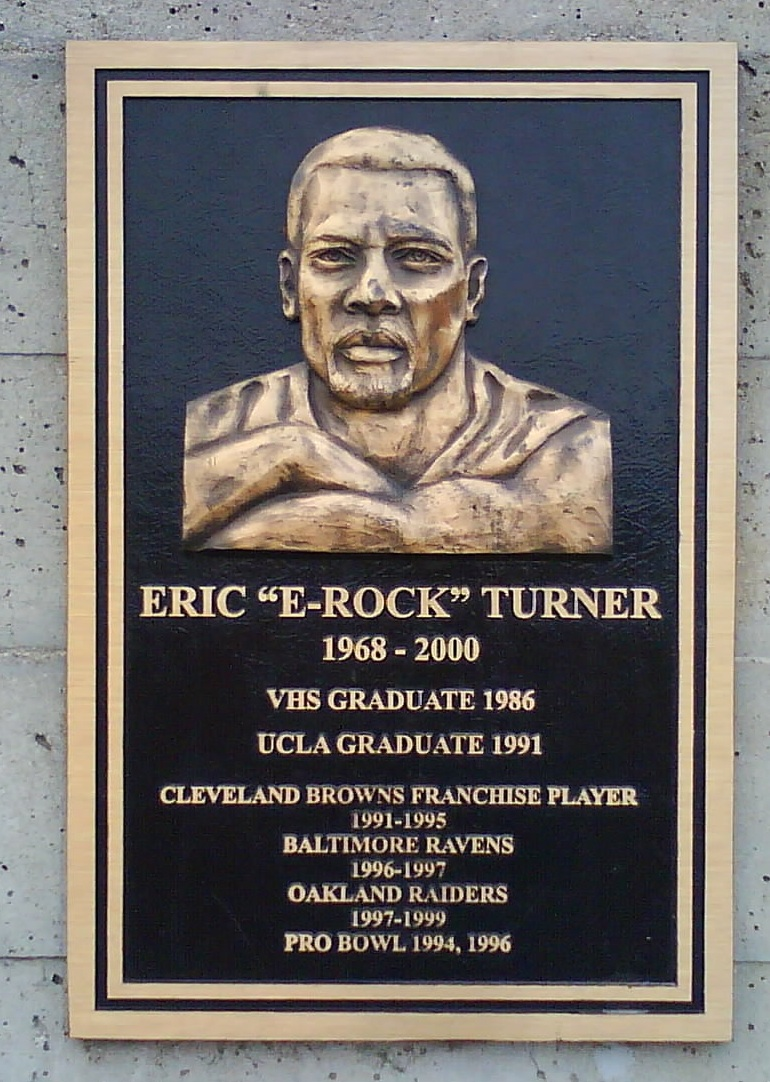
Eric Turner plaque

== Notable alumni ==
- Chris Beal, CIF champion wrestler; professional mixed martial artist formerly with UFC
- Tyler Ebell, football player for UCLA Bruins, UTEP Miners, Edmonton Eskimos, Toronto Argonauts, and BC Lions
- Michael Enfield, soccer player, a 3-year starter for UCLA, member of Sydney FC
- James Ennis, basketball player, small forward for the Miami Heat and Perth Wildcats
- Roman Fortin, NFL football player with Detroit Lions, Atlanta Falcons, and San Diego Chargers
- Karen Grassle, actress, best known for playing Caroline Ingalls on Little House on the Prairie
- Charles R. "Chuck" Imbrecht, member of California State Assembly, 36th district
- Brook Jacoby, baseball player, Cleveland Indians
- Thomas C. Katsouleas, president of the University of Connecticut
- Kyle, rapper
- Don Lang, third baseman with St. Louis Cardinals
- Mike Larrabee, double gold medalist in track and field at the 1964 Tokyo Olympics
- Bill Payne, founding member of the band Little Feat; graduated 1967
- Chris Thomas, professional football player with San Francisco 49ers, Washington Redskins, St. Louis Rams, and Kansas City Chiefs
- Eric Turner, NFL defensive back for Cleveland Browns, Baltimore Ravens, and Oakland Raiders
- Jamaal Wilkes, basketball player for UCLA Bruins, Golden State Warriors, and Los Angeles Lakers
- Adam Bradford Carroll, Guitarist for the metal band Warbringer
- Shannon Sturges, actor, best known for Savannah and Days of Our Lives
- Sadie Engelhardt, track and field athlete
