= Roman Fortin =

American football player (born 1967)

No. 48, 65, 67
- Positions: Center, guard, tackle

Personal information
- Born: February 26, 1967 (age 59); Columbus, Ohio, U.S.
- Listed height: 6 ft 5 in (1.96 m)
- Listed weight: 297 lb (135 kg)

Career information
- High school: Ventura (Ventura, California)
- College: San Diego State
- NFL draft: 1990: 8th round, 203rd overall pick

Career history
- Detroit Lions (1990–1991); Atlanta Falcons (1992–1997); San Diego Chargers (1998–2001)

Awards and highlights
- Second-team All-WAC (1989)

Career NFL statistics
- Games played: 147
- Games started: 102
- Fumble recoveries: 5
- Stats at Pro Football Reference

Roman Brian Fortin (born February 26, 1967) is an American former professional football player who was an offensive lineman in the National Football League (NFL) from 1991 to 2000. He played center, guard, tackle, and tight end through the course of his career. He was the quarterback for his high school team at Ventura High School. He played the first part of his college football career for the Oregon State Beavers, and later transferred to San Diego State Aztecs. He was selected in the 1990 NFL draft by the Detroit Lions. He played with them in the 1991 season, but would end up being picked up by the Atlanta Falcons in 1992. He stayed there through the 1997 season, where he would then play for the San Diego Chargers for his last three seasons.

He now lives in Atlanta, Georgia, and is part owner of The Forum Athletic Club.
