= WUVT-FM =

- Blacksburg, Virginia; United States
- Broadcast area: Montgomery County
- Frequency: 90.7 MHz
- Branding: WUVT-FM 90.7 Blacksburg

Programming
- Format: Freeform

Ownership
- Owner: Virginia Polytechnic Institute and State University
- Operator: The Educational Media Company at Virginia Tech

History
- Founded: March 1948
- First air date: September 23, 1969
- Call sign meaning: University of Virginia Tech

Technical information
- Licensing authority: FCC
- Facility ID: 70278
- Class: C3
- ERP: 6,500 watts
- HAAT: 130.9 meters (429 ft)
- Transmitter coordinates: 37°11′12.0″N 80°28′53.80″W

Links
- Public license information: Public file; LMS
- Webcast: Listen live
- Website: www.wuvt.vt.edu

WUVT-FM (90.7 FM) is a non-commercial radio station licensed to Blacksburg, Virginia, United States, serving Montgomery County, Virginia. It is licensed to Virginia Tech and is operated by The Educational Media Company at Virginia Tech. WUVT-FM is largely student-run and broadcasts a free form radio format. The radio studios and offices are located in Squires Student Center.

The transmitter is on Price Mountain, off Stroubles Creek Road in Blacksburg.

== History ==
=== Early years ===
WUVT, in one form or another, has been located on the campus of Virginia Tech since its founding. It began as an experimental AM radio station in March 1948. That makes it one of the longest running non-commercial radio stations in Virginia. It originally began operations when a student built an AM transmitter in his dorm room. WUVT-FM signed on the air as an FM station on September 23, 1969. Today, like other student media organizations on campus, WUVT is a division of The Educational Media Company at Virginia Tech.

WUVT is known for its eclectic programming, covering a wide swath of past and present music styles. DJs are typically students and former students, who select content based upon their personal preferences. WUVT serves the community by offering music rarely heard on commercial radio stations.

=== Transmitter upgrade ===
Its transmitter is located on nearby Price Mountain, between Blacksburg and Radford, at a site shared with WBRW, "The Bear". The station transmits its signal with a Harris Z5CD solid state transmitter donated by Clear Channel.

Former WUVT Chief Engineer Kevin Sterne was injured in the April 16, 2007 Virginia Tech massacre. After hearing about Kevin’s strong passion for the radio station and WUVT's need to upgrade its aging transmitter, officials from Clear Channel and the Society of Broadcast Engineers assisted in returning WUVT to full power on April 28, 2007. Clear Channel donated a Harris Z5CD transmitter, transmitter building, and antenna sufficient to generate 10 KW. Orban, CBS Radio, and Electronics Research, Inc. (ERI) also offered equipment and technical assistance.

=== Power increase ===
Virginia Radio and TV website VARTV.com reported in 2007 that WUVT "has requested to move its antenna off-campus to a new location a mile away from and increase the antenna height from 141 feet to 429 feet. WUVT wants to be licensed as a Class C3 (from Class A) and increase its power from 3,000 watts to 10,000 watts."

In June 2008, WUVT received authorization from the Federal Communications Commission to begin building a 6,500 watt transmission facility. This construction permit was issued for a lower power than originally requested due to a conflicting application with WEHC, the Emory and Henry College radio station in Emory, Virginia, that also broadcasts at 90.7 MHz. Both stations filed requests for power increases which would have overlapped, so both WUVT and WEHC re-submitted their applications at a lower power.

Over summer 2009, WUVT moved equipment to the new site atop Price Mountain and removed the old transmitter from its location atop Lee Hall. During the transitional period, WUVT broadcast at low power from Squires Student Center.

In September 2009, the station received permission to begin broadcasting at 6,500 watts.

== Technical Accomplishments ==
- March 1947 - Low power AM station is put on the air by students.
- June 1969 - FM transmission authorized on 90.7 MHz with 10 watts ERP
- 1970s - Upgraded license to 770 watts ERP, on the air with the original 10W exciter driving a 430W amplifier. The amplifier was hand built and FCC type accepted by Geoff Mendenhall, a student at Ga Tech who used it for a few years at their station. (Geoff went on to become VP of RF Transmission at Gates Radio/Harris Briadcast)
- Early 1980s - Upgraded license again, this time to 3,000 watts ERP, with new transmitter from Broadcast Electronics
- Late 1990s - Initiated RealAudio web simulcast
- Dec 2005 - First dynamic RDS subcarrier on in the New River Valley market
- Apr 2007 - Return to full licensed power
- September 2007 - filed application with the FCC to increase power
- June 2008 - received a construction permit from the FCC to begin building a 6,500-watt transmission facility
- September 2009 - transmission facility construction completed and station begins broadcasting at 6,500 watts

== Related links ==
- Collegiate Times
- The Educational Media Company at Virginia Tech
