= Roadshow Revival =

The Roadshow Revival is a Johnny Cash Tribute Festival held at Mission Park in Ventura, California in June. The location of the Event is close to Johnny Cash's home and office in Casitas Springs and Ventura. It is produced by Ross Emery and Johnny Cash's daughter, Cindy Cash and features Outlaw Country acts, Rockabilly bands, a Johnny Cash Memorabilia Gallery, Pin-Up Girl Pageant, and a car and bike show.

== History ==
In 2009 musician and local business owner Ross Emery produced the first Johnny Cash Music Festival in Ventura County, with support from the Cash family, his brother, and the community of Ventura. The following year Ross bought the majority stake in the event and Cash's daughter Cindy joined the production team. In 2011, due to legal issues Emery was forced to change the event name to Roadshow Revival—A Tribute to the Music of Johnny Cash. Today, the Roadshow is one of the biggest tribute festivals on the West Coast.

=== Musical highlights ===
- 2009: Petty Cash, Larry Bagby
- 2010: W.S Holand, Robert Gordon, Slim Jim Phantom,
- 2011: Kris Kristofferson, X, Lee Rocker, The Blasters,
- 2012: Wanda Jackson, Carlene Carter,
- 2013: Junior Brown, Chris Shiflett (Foo Fighters),
- 2014: the Paladins, James Intveld, Dale Watson, Headliner and supporting acts TBA
- 2015: the Reverend Horton Heat, Billy Joe Shaver, the Blasters, Big Sandy and His Fly-Rite Boys, Robert Gordon, Slim Jim Phantom Trio,

== See also ==
- List of country music festivals
- Country music
