= National Scholastic Press Association =

Journalism nonprofit

The National Scholastic Press Association (NSPA) is a nonprofit organization founded in 1921 for high school and secondary school publications in the United States. The association is membership-based and annually hosts high school journalism conventions across the country. The NSPA is considered to be one of the most prestigious award bodies in high school journalism, comparable to the Pulitzer Prize.

== Organization ==
Based in Minneapolis, Minnesota, NSPA has had 501(c)(3) non-profit status since 1964. The Executive Director is Laura Widmer.

== Awards and scoring ==
The NSPA scores publications in five areas: Concept & Essentials; Content; Writing and Editing; Photography, Art and Graphics; and Layout. Judges account for differences among literary, feature and specialty magazines and score accordingly. For example, if photography is not included in a literary magazine, the score will not suffer since the artwork and graphics will be evaluated for the score in this section. Marks of Distinction will be given for accomplishments of extraordinary merit.

To receive the highest All-American Award, the magazine must earn at least four Marks of Distinction and 450 points out of a highest point total of 500 points. About five percent of all entries receive the coveted All-American Award.

Other Awards and Contests: In these categories, there are multiple awards every year:

- Newspaper Pacemaker
- Online Pacemakers
- Yearbook/Magazine Pacemakers
- Broadcast Pacemakers
- Individual Awards
  - Story of the Year
  - Brasler Prize
  - Picture of the Year
  - Design of the Year
  - Broadcast Story of the Year
  - Cartooning Awards
- Convention Best of Show
- Journalism Honor Roll
- Wikoff Scholarship
- H.L. Hall/Melinda Foys Adviser Fellowships
- RFK Journalism Award
- Courage in Student Journalism
- Pioneer Award
