= World Religions Conference =

Multi-faith conference held annually in Canada

World Religions Conference Official Logo

The World Religions Conference is a multi-faith conference typically held annually in various cities of Canada. The most noteworthy is held in South Western Ontario (Waterloo), that is considered Canada's largest and longest running multi-faith event of its kind. It started in 1981 in Brantford, Ontario. In 2001 it was moved to the University of Waterloo, Ontario. In 2005 it celebrated its Silver Jubilee (25 years) and was held in the Centre in the Square Kitchener, Ontario. From 2013~2015 it was held in the River Run Centre in Guelph. In recent years it has been organized annually the University of Waterloo, Ontario.

The World Religions Conference (WRC) brings together scholars from the world’s major religions to speak on a common topic from the point of view of their respective religious traditions. Faith groups make presentations of recitations of their holy scriptures and set up displays at the event. The WRC serves the purpose of educating members of the community regarding interesting and relevant topics by providing a platform where all major religions can pool their collective wisdom and teachings regarding the topic.

The conference is sponsored and organized by the Ahmadiyya Muslim Community of Canada with the partnership and cooperation of numerous faith groups, local municipalities and a few businesses. The event has been attended by 500~700 delegates from the public in recent years. Scholars representing 7~9 faiths from Indigenous Spirituality, Hinduism, Buddhism, Judaism, Christianity, Islam, Sikhism, Baháʼí Faith and Humanism included in each year. Several local, provincial and national leaders also attend and bring greetings to the delegates at the conference. The conference aims to bring different religious communities together in a manner which breeds tolerance, peace, cooperation, and understanding among the different religions of the society.

== See also ==
- Parliament of the World's Religions
- Congress of Leaders of World and Traditional Religions
