= El Camino High School (Ventura) =

Coordinates: 34.2784°N 119.2281°W

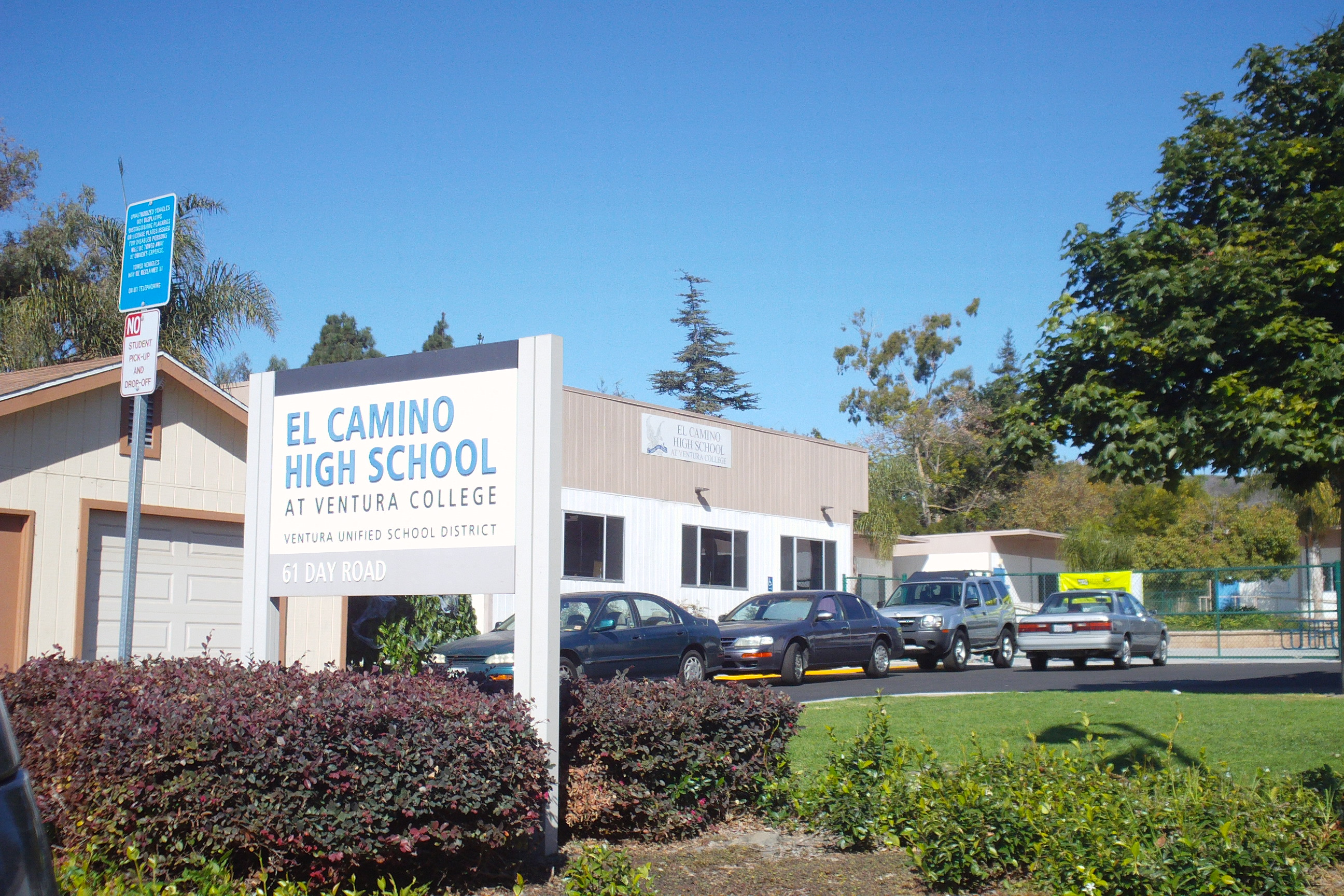

Location
- 61 Day Road; Ventura, California 93023; United States

Information
- Type: Public
- Established: 1982
- Principal: Hector Guerrero
- Staff: 7.20 (FTE)
- Faculty: 15
- Enrollment: 218 (2023–2024)
- Student to teacher ratio: 30.28
- Campus: Suburban
- Color
- Nickname: Eagles
- Website: El Camino High School at Ventura College

El Camino High School at Ventura College (ECHS) is a public independent study and middle college high school in Ventura, California. The school is part of the Ventura Unified School District (VUSD) and is located on the campus of Ventura College.

== History ==
El Camino High School first opened its doors in 1982, consisting of a single classroom at Will Rogers Elementary School in Ventura. The school later moved to its own campus on Dean Drive. In 2008 ECHS relocated to a 0.25-acre (0.10 ha) lot on the Ventura College campus, allowing it to increase its enrollment significantly, and adopted its current name.

The school was named a California Distinguished School in the 2012–13 school year.

== Academics and student life ==
El Camino High School offers college preparatory courses on an independent study basis that meet University of California "A—G" admission requirements, with educational pathways that include community college classes, internships, community service projects, and participation in work experience. Students are required to complete a minimum of 20 hours of coursework per week and meet with their teacher weekly to submit work and take tests. They must also complete at least one Ventura College course each semester. Many students also work full- or part-time, earning credits towards graduation through work experience classes.

ECHS offers a limited number of extracurricular activities, including events organized by its leadership class and clubs run by some students. It does not have an athletic program, and many students instead supplement their core school work with activities such as music, art, drama, or sports at other local high schools.
