= Buena High School (California) =

Coordinates: 34°16′39.32″N 119°13′01.76″W

Location
- 5670 Telegraph Road; Ventura, California 93003; United States

Information
- Type: Public
- Established: 1961
- School district: Ventura Unified School District
- Principal: Audrey Asplund
- Staff: 70.69 (FTE)
- Enrollment: 1,685 (2023–2024)
- Student to teacher ratio: 23.84
- Campus: Mid-size city
- Colors: Blue and black
- Athletics conference: CIF Southern Section; Channel League
- Nickname: Bulldogs
- Rival: Ventura High School
- Newspaper: Buena Speaks
- Yearbook: Conquistador
- Website: www.venturausd.org/buena/HOME.aspx

Buena High School (BHS) is a comprehensive public high school located in Ventura, California, United States. Opened in 1961, it is part of the Ventura Unified School District and serves the eastern portion of Ventura.

== Athletics ==
Buena High School athletic teams are nicknamed the Bulldogs. The school competes in the Channel League, a league affiliated with CIF Southern Section. The school previously competed in the Pacific View League. Buena's main rival is Ventura High School, which serves the western half of the city of Ventura.

=== Girls' basketball ===
Buena High School girls' basketball team is the most successful team in both wins and winning percentage in California history. The Buena girls' program has won two California Interscholastic Federation (CIF) state titles and 14 CIF championship appearances.

In a 40-year span, Buena has won 34 Channel League titles. Buena has produced two Parade All Americans, Kelly Greathouse and Courtney Young, along with one McDonald's All American, Courtney LaVere. Alum Teresa Palmisano moved on to play professionally for 12 years, reaching the Euro Cup Finals as well as playing for the Cleveland Rockers of the WNBA. Alum Samantha Allison Whitcomb (born July 20, 1988) is an American-Australian professional basketball player for the Phoenix Mercury of the Women's National Basketball Association (WNBA). She played college basketball for the Washington Huskies before making a name for herself in Australia with the Rockingham Flames in the State Basketball League (SBL) and the Perth Lynx in the Women's National Basketball League (WNBL). She made her debut in the WNBA in 2017 and won championships with the Seattle Storm in 2018 and 2020. She became an Australian citizen in 2018 and made her debut for the Australian Opals. With the Bendigo Spirit in 2025, she was named WNBL Most Valuable Player and won her first WNBL championship.

The Buena girls' team have eight undefeated regular seasons, most in California.

In 2005-2006 Heaven Kerr was one of the first and only girl wrestlers.

== Music department ==
The Buena High School music program dates back to the fall of 1961, when Buena first opened its doors for students. Students participating in the Buena Music Department have opportunities to perform in ensembles including Marching Band, Concert Band, Wind Ensemble, String Orchestra, Beginning Instruments, Studio 'A' Jazz Band, Lab Jazz Ensemble, Winter Percussion Ensemble, and Winter Colorguard.

During the 2012–2013 school year, the Winter Colorguard received a bronze medal at the Winter Guard Association of Southern California (WGASC) Championships in the Regional AA Division, having been promoted from the Regional A Division at the beginning of the season.

In the 2013–2014 school year, the Wind Ensemble received a Unanimous Superior Rating at an SCSBOA Concert Festival held at West Ranch High School in the Spring of 2014.

In the 2014–2015 school year, the "Pride of the Gold Coast" set a twelve-year high score in the 3A division in SCSBOA competition. The Wind Ensemble received a Unanimous Superior rating at an SCSBOA festival held at Santa Susana High School in the spring of 2015.

In the 2015–2016 school year, the marching band qualified for the SCSBOA Championships for the second time in the program's history. The band qualified in first place out of more than thirty 2A division groups and maintained its first-place standing in the finals against eleven other competitors, receiving the first SCSBOA gold medal in the school's history. The final score of 87.3 is the highest score on record for the 2A division in SCSBOA finals competition.

== Drama productions ==
Previous productions include The Nightmare Before Christmas (2004), The Breakfast Club (2005), Moulin Rouge! (2007), To Kill A Mockingbird (2007), and Little Shop of Horrors (2008). The 2008–09 season included Much Ado About Nothing and Beauty and the Beast as well as student directed one-act plays, a musical revue, an annual short film festival, Red Ribbon Week skits, and the annual "Comedy Shop".

== Notable alumni ==
- Owen Bucey, musician, Army of Freshmen and the Calamity
- Kelsey (Gerckens) Buttitta, KEYT-TV news anchor and winner of The Amazing Race
- Kevin Costner, actor and filmmaker (attended but did not graduate)
- Troy Dumais, 2012 Olympic diving medalist
- Aaron Goldberg, musician and filmmaker, Army of Freshmen
- Freddy Keiaho, Super Bowl XLI and Super Bowl XLIV NFL linebacker with the Indianapolis Colts
- Ethan Klein, co-creator of YouTube channel h3h3Productions and the co-host of the H3 Podcast
- Brandon Knight, right-handed pitcher for the Nexen Heroes of the Korea Baseball Organization, formerly with the New York Yankees and Mets
- Zachary Levi, actor
- Donovan Melero, musician and singer-songwriter, Hail the Sun and Sianvar
- Kevin Paffrath, YouTuber and unsuccessful candidate for Governor of California
- Sara Randall, nonprofit founder of Dolly Parton's Imagination Library, Colorado & Dolly Parton's Imagination Library, Denver
- David N. Weiss, screenwriter
- Sami Whitcomb, basketball player
