= Casitas Springs, California =

Unincorporated community in California, United States

- Unincorporated community
- Location within California Location within the United States
- Coordinates: 34°22′17″N 119°18′23″W
- Country: United States
- State: California
- County: Ventura
- Elevation: 289 ft (88 m)

Population (1999)
  - Total: 1,038
- Time zone: UTC-8 (Pacific (PST))
  - Summer (DST): UTC-7 (PDT)
- Area code: 805
- GNIS feature ID: 240315

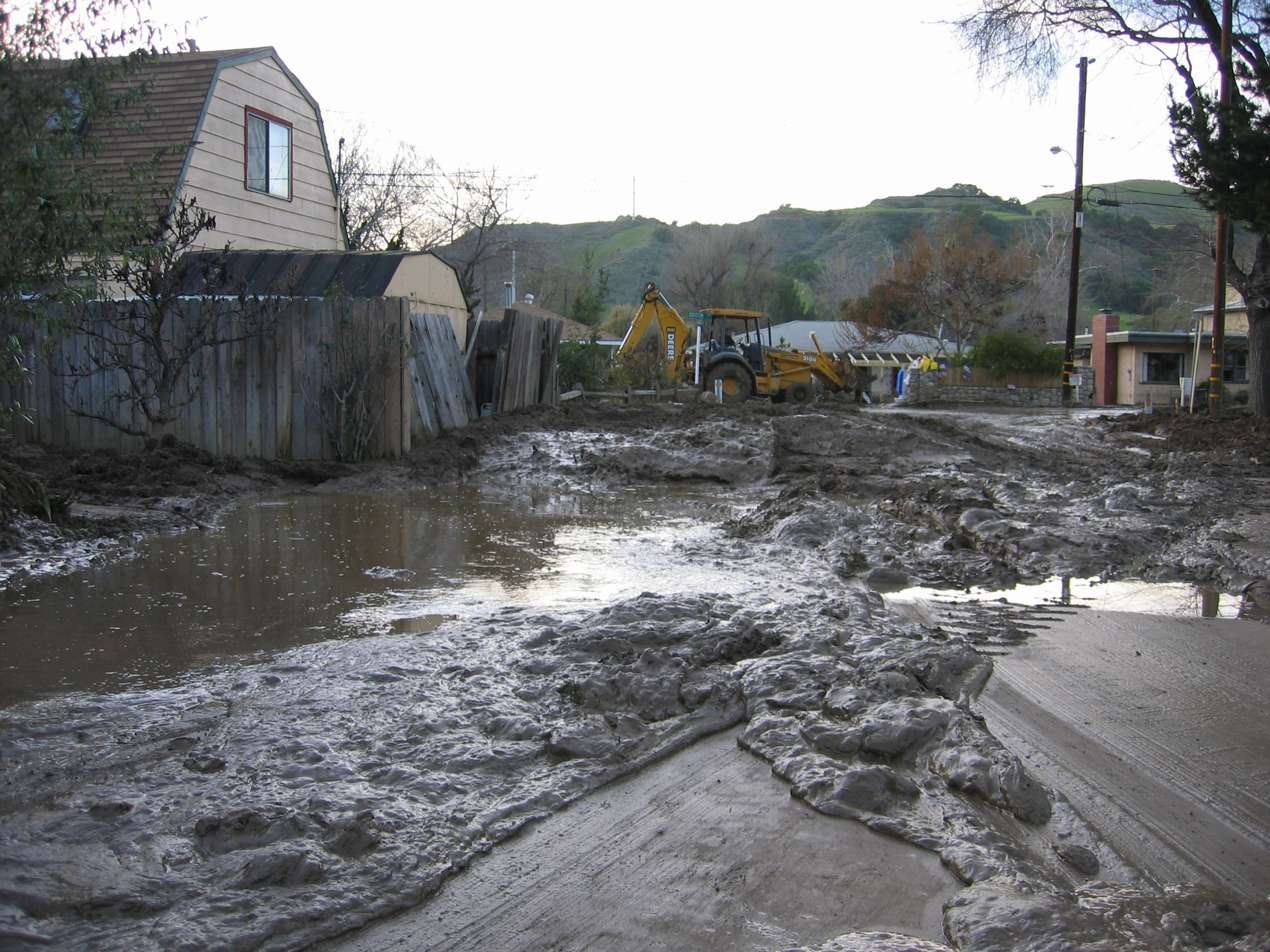
Mud and water from winter storms that damaged property and roads in Casitas Springs. FEMA photo taken on 01-15-2005.

Casitas Springs (/kəˌsiːtəs -/; Casitas, Spanish for "little houses") is an unincorporated community in Ventura County, California, United States, located 1.2 miles (1.9 km) east of Lake Casitas. It is an old community which was recorded as Arroyo de Las Casitas (“creek of the little houses”) in 1864. It has a population of 1,038 as of 1999, down from 1,090 in 1990 Census. Casitas Springs is located along California State Route 33 2 miles (3.2 km) south of Oak View.

It is known for its groves of eucalyptus trees along the highway.

== History ==
The community was first recorded in 1864 under the name Arroyo de Las Casitas (“creek of the little houses”).

The same 2005 winter storms that damaged nearby La Conchita also damaged Casitas Springs.

== Economy ==
The oldest, most rural winery in Ventura County is near the community.

== Notable people ==
- Johnny Cash, musician

== See also ==
- Roadshow Revival
