= Associated Collegiate Press =

College student media membership organization

The Associated Collegiate Press (ACP) is the largest and oldest national membership organization for college student media in the United States. The ACP is a division of the National Scholastic Press Association. It awards the newspaper, magazine, and online National Pacemaker Awards, which are considered the highest honors a student publication can receive. The organization is headquartered in Minneapolis, Minnesota.

Membership fees are based on enrollment. Membership is also open to student publications outside the U.S.
