= Songwriter (Johnny Cash album) =

Studio album by Johnny Cash
- Released: June 28, 2024
- Recorded: early 1993, with overdubs in 2023
- Studio: LSI Studios (Nashville); Cash Cabin Studio (Hendersonville, Tennessee)
- Genre: Country
- Length: 30:53
- Label: Mercury Nashville; UMe
- Producer: Johnny Cash; John Carter Cash; Mike Daniel; David R. Ferguson; Josh Matas

Johnny Cash chronology
Johnny Cash and the Royal Philharmonic Orchestra (2020)	Songwriter (2024)

Songwriter is the seventy-second studio album (and fifth posthumously released studio album) by Johnny Cash. It was released on June 28, 2024, through Mercury Nashville. It consists of songs Cash recorded in 1993 and the finished album features overdubs with additional musicians.

Produced by Johnny Cash, John Carter Cash, David R. Ferguson, Josh Matas, and Mike Daniel, the album contains eleven original songs by Cash: the album's lead single, "Well Alright", was released on April 23, 2024.

== Background ==
The album was recorded as a series of songwriting demos at LSI Studios (then owned by Ken Little with Pat Holt, Mike Daniel and his wife Rosie managing the studio) at the time in early 1993 when Cash wasn't signed to a label and shortly before he met Rick Rubin. The songs were written over several decades: "Drive On" was recent, "Hello Out There" and "Poor Valley Girl" have been dated to the late '70s and "Sing It Pretty, Sue" had appeared as the last track of the 1962 album The Sound of Johnny Cash. The tapes were shelved when Cash instead made the American Recordings album with Rubin, although he used re-recordings of the songs "Drive On" and "Like A Soldier" for that album. One track, "I Love You Tonite", is about his relationship with his wife, June Carter Cash.

After rediscovering the demos, John Carter Cash and David "Fergie" Ferguson stripped them back to just Cash's vocals and guitar before overdubbing newly recorded parts by a new band, including several musicians who had worked with Cash such as Marty Stuart (credited in the liner notes as having been involved in the original recordings) and David Roe. The recordings also retain original backing vocals recorded by Waylon Jennings, who died in 2002.

== Critical reception ==
Professional ratings
Aggregate scores
Source	Rating
Metacritic	77/100
Review scores
Source	Rating
AllMusic	4/5 stars
The Arts Desk	4/5 stars
Mojo	4/5 stars

Songwriter received positive reviews from music critics. At Metacritic, which assigns a normalized rating out of 100 to reviews from mainstream critics, the album received a score of 77 out of 100 based on nine reviews, indicating "generally favorable reviews".

Stephen Thomas Erlewine at AllMusic compared Songwriter to another posthumous Cash release, 2014's Out Among the Stars, finding this record "a marginally stronger set, knitted together by bold, intertwining, recurring themes" and praising the decision to root the instrumentation in the styles Cash employed before his collaboration with Rubin." Liz Thomson at The Arts Desk observed that after the first two tracks the album "has a much more retro sound" than the subsequent American Recordings era, concluding that the album is "a happy reminder of Cash's great talent". Mojo was skeptical of the attempt on "Hello Out There" to "put Cash in conversation with a future he never knew – namely the postmodern outlaw updates of Sturgill Simpson" but praised the decision to curb such "revisionist impulses" on the rest of the album in favour of allowing Cash's songs to star, concluding "it is a worthy effort because it reinforces the humanity of a star who, in his last days, could seem like some untouchable god."

== Track listing ==
All tracks are written by Johnny Cash, except where noted.

Songwriter track listing
No.	Title	Length
1.	"Hello Out There"	3:03
2.	"Spotlight"	2:47
3.	"Drive On"	3:21
4.	"I Love You Tonite"	3:20
5.	"Have You Ever Been to Little Rock?"	2:43
6.	"Well Alright"	2:12
7.	"She Sang Sweet Baby James"	3:20
8.	"Poor Valley Girl"	2:16
9.	"Soldier Boy"	2:49
10.	"Sing It Pretty Sue"	2:17
11.	"Like a Soldier"	2:45
Total length:		30:53

2CD edition bonus disc – Icon
No.	Title	Writer(s)	Original album	Length
1.	"I Walk the Line"		Classic Cash: Hall of Fame Series (1988)	2:33
2.	"The Night Hank Williams Came to Town" (with Waylon Jennings)	Bobby Braddock, Charlie Williams	Johnny Cash Is Coming to Town (1987)	3:24
3.	"Sixteen Tons"	Merle Travis	Johnny Cash Is Coming to Town (1987)	2:46
4.	"Long Black Veil"	Danny Dill; Marijohn Wilkin	Classic Cash: Hall of Fame Series (1988)	3:14
5.	"Cry! Cry! Cry!"		Classic Cash: Hall of Fame Series (1988)	2:24
6.	"Guess Things Happen That Way"	Jack Clement	Classic Cash: Hall of Fame Series (1988)	1:45
7.	"Get Rhythm"		Classic Cash: Hall of Fame Series (1988)	2:30
8.	"Ring of Fire"	June Carter Cash; Merle Kilgore	Classic Cash: Hall of Fame Series (1988)	2:43
9.	"Folsom Prison Blues"		Classic Cash: Hall of Fame Series (1988)	2:44
10.	"Cat's in the Cradle"	Harry Chapin; Sandy Chapin	Boom Chicka Boom (1990)	3:18
11.	"Hey Porter"		The Mystery of Life (1991)	2:20
12.	"Wanted Man"	Bob Dylan; Cash	The Mystery of Life (1991)	2:52

== Personnel ==
Performance

- Pete Abbott – drums (tracks 2, 4, 6, 8–11), bongos (3), percussion (3)
- Dan Auerbach – electric guitar, tambourine (track 2)
- Sam Bacco – drums (tracks 1, 6), congas (2, 4, 8), percussion (2, 11), triangle (7), tambourine (8), cymbals (11)
- Ana Cristina Cash – backing vocals (tracks 1, 6)
- Johnny Cash – lead vocals
- John Carter Cash – acoustic guitar, electric guitar (track 2)
- Joseph Cash – drums (track 3), Hammond B3 (11)
- Matt Combs – strings (tracks 1, 2, 6, 7); acoustic guitar, mandolin (7)
- Vince Gill – backing vocals (track 8)
- Mark Howard – acoustic guitar, banjo (track 8)
- Waylon Jennings – backing vocals (tracks 4, 11)
- Russ Pahl – steel guitar (tracks 1, 3, 4, 6, 7), acoustic guitar (2, 4, 5, 10, 11), electric guitar (2, 11), bass (3), baritone guitar (6), Dobro (8)
- Dave Roe – upright bass (tracks 1, 4, 6–9), bass guitar (2, 5, 10, 11)
- Mike Rojas – Hammond B3 (tracks 2, 5), Wurlitzer organ (3), piano (4, 11)
- Harry Stinson – backing vocals (tracks 1, 2, 5–7, 10)
- Marty Stuart – electric guitar (tracks 1, 2, 4, 6–10), acoustic guitar (1, 3, 4, 6, 7, 9), backing vocals (4), mandolin (5, 11)

Production

- Trey Call – engineering
- Johnny Cash – production
- John Carter Cash – production
- Joseph Cash – engineering assistance
- Mike Daniel – production
- Richard Dodd – mastering
- Cameron Davidson – mixing assistance
- David R. Ferguson – production, mixing
- Josh Matas – production
- Chuck Turner – engineering

== Charts ==
=== Weekly charts ===
Weekly chart performance for Songwriter
Chart (2024)	Peak position
Australian Albums (ARIA)	64
Australian Country Albums (ARIA)	9
Belgian Albums (Ultratop Flanders)	9
Belgian Albums (Ultratop Wallonia)	40
Croatian International Albums (HDU)	29
Dutch Albums (Album Top 100)	4
German Albums (Offizielle Top 100)	4
Irish Albums (IRMA)	85
Italian Albums (FIMI)	100
Scottish Albums (OCC)	4
Swedish Physical Albums (Sverigetopplistan)	4
Swiss Albums (Schweizer Hitparade)	6
UK Albums (OCC)	42
UK Country Albums (OCC)	1
US Billboard 200	92
US Americana/Folk Albums (Billboard)	12
US Top Country Albums (Billboard)	23

=== Year-end charts ===
Year-end chart performance for Songwriter
Chart (2024)	Position
Australian Country Albums (ARIA)	63
