= Walk the Line (soundtrack) =

Walk the Line: Original Motion Picture Soundtrack

Soundtrack album by Various Artists
- Released: November 15, 2005
- Recorded: 2005
- Studio: Sound Emporium (Nashville, Tennessee)
- Genre: Rock and roll; rockabilly; country
- Length: 41:38
- Label: Wind-up Records; Fox Music; Sony BMG
- Producer: T-Bone Burnett

Professional ratings
Review scores
Source	Rating
AllMusic	3/5 stars

Walk the Line: Original Motion Picture Soundtrack is the soundtrack album to the 2005 biographical drama film of the same name released November 15, 2005 by Wind-up Records, Fox Music, and Sony BMG. There are nine songs performed by Joaquin Phoenix (as Johnny Cash), four songs by Reese Witherspoon (as June Carter Cash), one song by Waylon Payne (as Jerry Lee Lewis), one song by Johnathan Rice (as Roy Orbison), two songs by Tyler Hilton (as Elvis Presley), and one song by Shooter Jennings (as Waylon Jennings). At the Golden Globe Awards Joaquin Phoenix was awarded the Best Actor – Comedy or Musical and Reese Witherspoon was awarded the Best Actress – Comedy or Musical, as well as the film won the Best Motion Picture – Musical or Comedy. Joaquin Phoenix and Reese Witherspoon were also nominated for the Academy Award for Best Actor and Best Actress, which Witherspoon won.

Walk the Line is an enhanced CD which also contains two deleted scenes from the film: Phoenix performing "Rock 'n' Roll Ruby" and Phoenix and Witherspoon together near the scene of "Jackson".

The cover features the two stars in an early publicity still, several of which were included as bonus postcards in the Collector's Edition DVD.

As of May 17, 2006 the soundtrack was certified platinum by the RIAA with over 1,000,000 copies sold.

On February 11, 2007, this album won a Grammy Award for Best Compilation Soundtrack Album for Motion Pictures, Television or Other Visual Media.

== Track listing ==
No.	Title	Writer(s)	Performer	Length
1.	"Get Rhythm"	Johnny Cash	Joaquin Phoenix	2:26
2.	"I Walk the Line"	J. Cash	Phoenix	3:20
3.	"Wildwood Flower"	Traditional	Reese Witherspoon	2:31
4.	"Lewis Boogie"	Jerry Lee Lewis	Waylon Payne	2:01
5.	"Ring of Fire"	June Carter Cash, Merle Kilgore	Phoenix	3:42
6.	"You're My Baby"	J. Cash	Johnathan Rice	2:12
7.	"Cry! Cry! Cry!"	J. Cash	Phoenix	2:35
8.	"Folsom Prison Blues"	J. Cash	Phoenix	2:52
9.	"That's All Right"	Arthur Crudup	Tyler Hilton	1:46
10.	"Juke Box Blues"	Maybelle Carter, Helen Carter	Witherspoon	2:15
11.	"It Ain't Me Babe"	Bob Dylan	Phoenix and Witherspoon	3:05
12.	"Home of the Blues"	J. Cash, Lillie McAlpin, Glenn Douglas Tubb	Phoenix	2:40
13.	"Milk Cow Blues"	Kokomo Arnold	Hilton	2:19
14.	"I'm a Long Way from Home"	Hank Cochran	Shooter Jennings	2:15
15.	"Cocaine Blues"	Troy Junius Arnall	Phoenix	2:50
16.	"Jackson"	Billy Edd Wheeler, Jerry Leiber	Phoenix and Witherspoon	2:49
Total length:				41:38

== Additional tracks ==
The film also featured a variety of country, rockabilly and traditional scoring. They were not featured on the soundtrack CD.

1. "Engine 143" – The Carter Family
2. "Highway 61 Revisited" – Bob Dylan
3. "Didn't It Rain" – Sister Rosetta Tharpe
4. "Dark Was the Night, Cold Was the Ground" – Blind Willie Johnson
5. "Volksmusik Medley" – Hans Glisha Orchestra
6. "I Was There When It Happened" – Jimmie Davis
7. "Try Me One Time" – Willie Nix
8. "Ain't That Right" – Eddie Snow
9. "Boogie Blues" – Earl Peterson
10. "I Miss You Already" – Faron Young
11. "Defrost Your Heart" – Charlie Feathers
12. "Feelin' Good" – Little Junior's Blue Flames
13. "Bop Bop Baby" – Wade and Dick
14. "Rock With My Baby" – Billy Riley
15. "Rock N' Roll Ruby" – Joaquin Phoenix
16. "Fujiyama Mama" – Wanda Jackson
17. "She Wears Red Feathers" – Guy Mitchell
18. "Easy Does It" – Lewis LaMedica
19. "Hey Porter" – Joaquin Phoenix
20. "Candy Man Blues" – Johnny Holiday
21. "I Got Stripes" – Joaquin Phoenix
22. "Light of the Night" – Werner Tautz
23. "You Get To Me" – Minnie and the Minuettes
24. "Time's a Wastin'" – Joaquin Phoenix and Reese Witherspoon
25. "Ring of Fire" – Reese Witherspoon
26. "Cartoon World"
27. "Ghost Town/Poem For Eva" – Bill Frisell
28. "In the Sweet By and By"
29. "Long Legged Guitar Pickin' Man" – Johnny Cash and June Carter
30. "Rainy Day Women #12 & 35" – Bob Dylan

== Charts ==
=== Weekly charts ===
Chart (2005–06)	Peak position
Australian Albums (ARIA)	2
Austrian Albums (Ö3 Austria)	3
Belgian Albums (Ultratop Flanders)	23
Belgian Albums (Ultratop Wallonia)	53
Canadian Albums (Billboard)	4
Danish Albums (Hitlisten)	39
Dutch Albums (Album Top 100)	80
French Albums (SNEP)	55
German Albums (Offizielle Top 100)	12
New Zealand Albums (RMNZ)	6
Swiss Albums (Schweizer Hitparade)	17
US Billboard 200	9
US Top Country Albums (Billboard)	3
US Soundtrack Albums (Billboard)	1

=== Year-end charts ===
Chart (2006)	Position
Australian Albums (ARIA)	42
Austrian Albums (Ö3 Austria)	58
German Albums (Offizielle Top 100)	79
US Billboard 200	44
US Top Country Albums (Billboard)	12
US Soundtrack Albums (Billboard)	2

Chart (2007)	Position
US Top Country Albums (Billboard)	45
US Soundtrack Albums (Billboard)	13

== Certifications ==
Region	Certification	Certified units/sales
Australia (ARIA)	Platinum	70,000^{^}
Canada (Music Canada)	2× Platinum	200,000^{^}
Germany (BVMI)	Gold	100,000^{‡}
Ireland (IRMA)	3× Platinum	45,000^{^}
New Zealand (RMNZ)	Gold	7,500^{^}
United States (RIAA)	Platinum	1,000,000^{^}
^{^} Shipments figures based on certification alone.^{‡} Sales+streaming figures based on certification alone.
