= Johnny Cash and the Royal Philharmonic Orchestra =

Compilation album by Johnny Cash
- Released: November 13, 2020
- Recorded: 2019–2020
- Studio: Abbey Road Studios, London, England
- Label: Columbia; Legacy
- Producer: Nick Patrick; Don Reedman; John Carter Cash (exec.); Josh Matas (exec.)

Johnny Cash chronology
Out Among the Stars (2014)	Johnny Cash and the Royal Philharmonic Orchestra (2020)	Songwriter (2024)

Johnny Cash and the Royal Philharmonic Orchestra is a posthumously released album by Johnny Cash. It was released on November 13, 2020 by Columbia Records and Legacy Recordings. The album features Cash's original vocals with new orchestral arrangements by the Royal Philharmonic Orchestra. Don Reedman, who produced the album with Nick Patrick, said: "I believe we have captured the emotion, sensitivity and genuine honesty of Johnny Cash through his story telling and his touching and captivating vocal performances."

The album debuted at number 10 on the UK Albums Chart, selling 7,861 units in its first week. It is Cash's first charting album since Out Among the Stars (2014).

== Track listing ==
Johnny Cash and the Royal Philharmonic Orchestra track listing
No.	Title	Writer(s)	Length
1.	"Man in Black"	Johnny Cash
2.	"Galway Bay"	Arthur Colahan
3.	"Girl from the North Country" (Bob Dylan with Johnny Cash)	Bob Dylan
4.	"I Came to Believe"	Cash
5.	"A Thing Called Love"	Jerry Reed
6.	"The Loving Gift" (with June Carter Cash)	Kris Kristofferson
7.	"I Walk the Line"	Cash
8.	"Farther Along" (featuring Duane Eddy)	Traditional
9.	"Flesh and Blood"	Cash
10.	"The Gambler"	Don Schlitz
11.	"Ring of Fire"	June Carter; Merle Kilgore
12.	"Highwayman" (performed by The Highwaymen)	Jimmy Webb

== Charts ==
Chart performance for Johnny Cash and the Royal Philharmonic Orchestra
Chart (2020)	Peak position
Australian Albums (ARIA)	12
Austrian Albums (Ö3 Austria)	54
Dutch Albums (Album Top 100)	100
Irish Albums (OCC)	5
Swiss Albums (Schweizer Hitparade)	90
UK Albums (OCC)	8
