= Margaret Barnes =

Margaret Barnes may refer to:

- Margaret Ayer Barnes (1886–1967), American playwright, novelist and short-story writer
- Margaret Anne Barnes (1927–2007), American writer
- Margaret Barnes (marine biologist) (1919–2009), British marine biologist
- Margaret Barnes of Westminster (16th-century), English tavern keeper, known as Long Meg of Westminster
- Margaret Barnes (javelin thrower) (born 1920), American javelin thrower, runner-up at the 1938 USA Outdoor Track and Field Championships
