= Murder in Coweta County (film) =

1983 American television film by Gary Nelson

- Genre: Crime drama
- Based on: Murder in Coweta County by Margaret Anne Barnes
- Screenplay by: Dennis Nemec
- Directed by: Gary Nelson
- Starring: Johnny Cash; Andy Griffith; Earl Hindman
- Music by: Brad Fiedel
- Country of origin: United States
- Original language: English

Production
- Executive producers: Michael Lepiner and Lloyd Adams
- Producers: Michael Lepiner and Dick Atkins
- Cinematography: Larry Pizer
- Editor: Eric Albertson
- Running time: 1 hour 40 minutes
- Production companies: Telecom Entertainment Inc. The International Picture Show Company

Original release
- Network: CBS
- Release: February 15, 1983

Murder in Coweta County is a 1983 American made-for-television drama film starring Johnny Cash and Andy Griffith. It originally aired on February 15, 1983 on CBS. It is based on actual events of a murder in Coweta County in April 1948 committed in Coweta County in the U.S. state of Georgia.

== Plot ==
The film centers around two main characters, Sheriff Lamar Potts of Coweta County, Georgia, and John Wallace of Meriwether County, Georgia, who rules a vast estate known as "The Kingdom".

Wilson Turner, a poor white tenant sharecropper, was dismissed by Wallace, even though he was given permission to do the liquor run. He was forced to leave his home, with his wife and child, and was unable to harvest his crops on his farm. In revenge, Turner decided to steal one of Wallace's prized Guernsey cows. He was captured in a neighboring county and brought back to Meriwether County to face Wallace.

Turner was inexplicably released from jail due to a 'lack of evidence' by Sheriff Hardy Collier. Wallace and three of his men were waiting for him outside the jail, and at that stage Turner knew that it was a stitch up. He got into his truck and tried to escape, Wallace and his gang chased him on the pretext that Turner was an escaped prisoner. In the pursuit they had crossed the county line into Coweta County. Turner is forced to stop because he ran out of gasoline. Wallace then kills Turner by pistol-whipping him. Sheriff Potts then pursues Wallace and his gang to obtain justice for Turner, but needs to gather enough evidence to prove his case. Wallace has two of his field hands assist him in burning Turner's body and arrogantly assumes he is above the law. An informant tells Sheriff Potts about this and the two field hands agree to testify against Wallace at his trial. In the end, Wallace is sentenced to death and executed in the electric chair. The films credits tell how Potts later went on to serve as Sheriff of Coweta County for 32 years.

== Cast ==
- Johnny Cash as Lamar Potts
- Andy Griffith as John Wallace
- Earl Hindman as J.H. Potts
- Ed Van Nuys as Huddleston
- Robert Schenkkan as Wilson Turner
- Jo Henderson as Josephine Wallace
- Daniel Keyes as Elzie Hancock
- Danny Nelson as Sheriff Hardy Collier
- Norman Matlock as Albert Brooks
- Brent Jennings as Robert Lee Gates
- June Carter Cash as Mayhayley Lancaster
- James Neal as A.L. Henson
- J. Don Ferguson as Jim Hillin
