= Ana Cristina Cash =

Cuban-American singer-songwriter (born 1985)

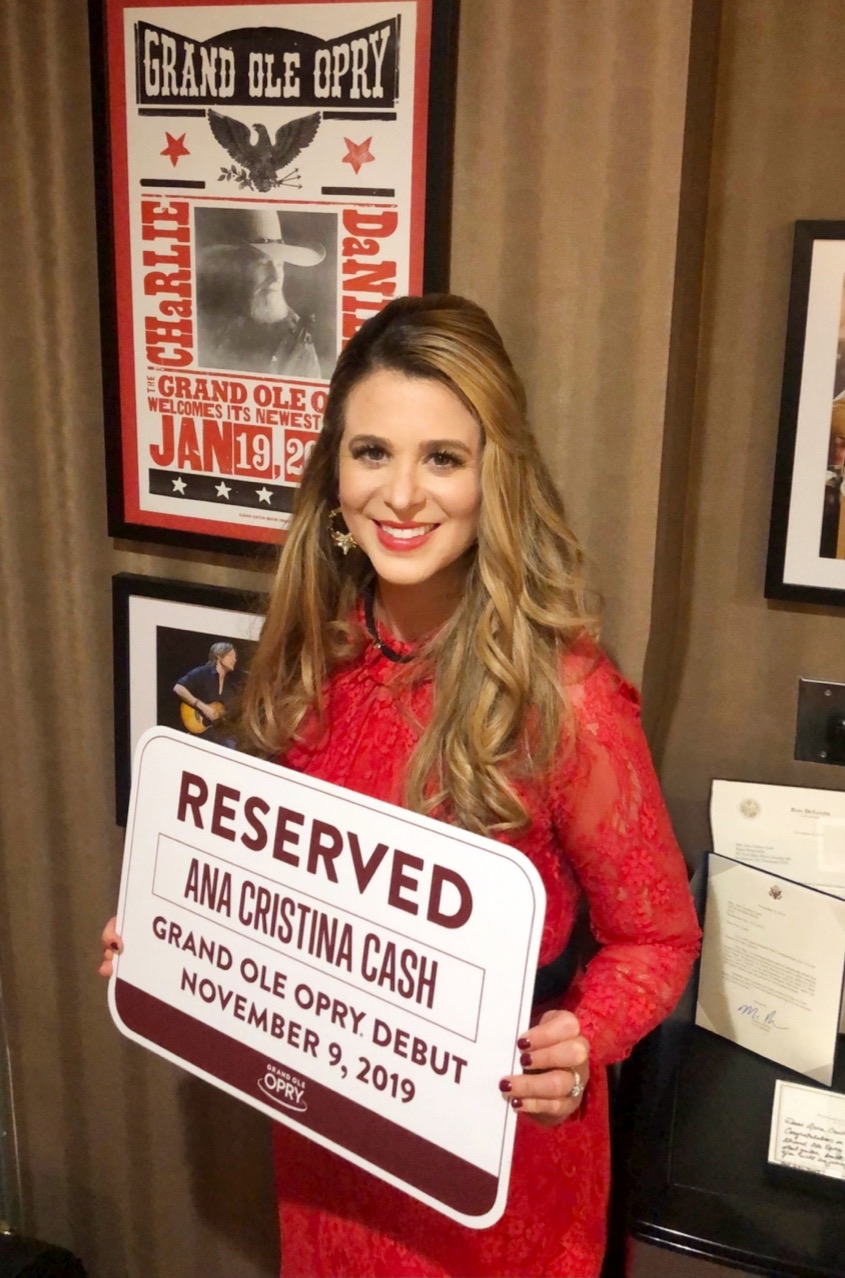
- Cash Grand Ole Opry Debut at the Ryman Auditorium (2019)
- Born: Ana Cristina Álvarez; June 2, 1985 (age 41); Miami, Florida, U.S.
- Education: Florida International University; Harvard University
- Occupation: Singer-songwriter
- Spouse: John Carter Cash (m. 2016)
- Children: 2
- Musical career
- Also known as: Ana Cristina
- Genres: Pop, country, Latin
- Years active: 1991–present
- Label: Sony Music Latin
- Website: anacristinacash.com

Ana Cristina Cash (née Álvarez; 2 June 1985) is an American singer-songwriter.

== Early life and career beginnings ==
Ana Cristina Cash was born on June 2, 1985, in Miami, Florida, to Cuban parents—Rene Álvarez, an engineer who founded and runs an air conditioning company, and Teresita Vazquez Álvarez. They migrated to the United States in the early 1960s to escape Fidel Castro's Communist regime. Cristina Cash is of paternal Spanish ancestry from Asturias; Avilés and Corvera, through her great-grandparents. She is the youngest of three sisters.

As a child she tried out for the variety show Sabado Gigante on the Univision network and landed a spot, where she went on to appear frequently between ages six and 13, becoming a champion of the show's singing contests. In middle school she would be pulled from her Catholic school classes to sing at events like weddings and funerals.

Cash signed her first record deal, with Sony Music, at age 15. She attended high school at Gulliver Preparatory School in Miami, graduating in 2003, and went on to earn a bachelor's degree in journalism from Florida International University and a master's degree in creative writing from Harvard University.

== First recordings and early career ==
Her debut Spanish-language album as Ana Cristina with Sony Music's Latin division, titled Ana Cristina, was released in 2003. It included the single, "A Un Paso De Mi Amor," which had been featured the previous year on the soundtrack of Telemundo Network's telenovela Vale Todo. Another song from the album, ¡Vivan los niños!, was a closing theme of Televisa Network's 2002 telenovela ¡Vivan los niños!.

In 2004, Cash was selected to participate as a songwriter and performer in Festival Mundial De La Cancion ("World Festival of Song") in San Juan, Puerto Rico, as the year's sole representative from the United States, competing with her song "Cuando Menos Lo Esperas."

Cash's recording of Schubert's "Ave Maria" was part of Nuestra Navidad, a 2005 Sony Music Christmas compilation album that also included Jon Secada, Celia Cruz, José Feliciano and others. On 20 January 2005 she sang "The Star-Spangled Banner" at the Constitutional Ball, part of the Second inauguration of George W. Bush. Later that year she performed at Festival de Calle Ocho (Calle Ocho Music Festival) in Miami.

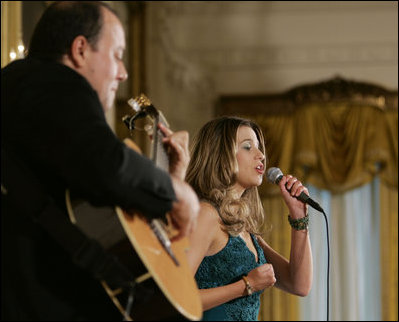
Ana Cristina performing at the White House in front of President Bush in 2006.

The following year she performed at the White House as a part of the celebration for Hispanic Heritage Month in front of President George W. Bush and Crown Prince of Spain. Also in 2006, she released the single "You Can Change the World" as a duet with MichelAngelo. Univision used the song's bilingual counterpart, "El Mundo Puedes Cambiar," as its theme song for its FIFA World Cup Germany 2006 coverage.

On 5 January 2009 she released on her own label her album Time, containing all original material, with six tracks in English and three in Spanish, produced by Randy Barlow.

== Career 2010s to present ==
In 2014 she recorded in Los Angeles her first English-language album, the pop/soul The West Coast Sessions, produced by Chris Price, in Los Angeles. That year she moved to Nashville.

She released the album in 2015. That year she performed with John Carter Cash at the Country Music Hall of Fame's album release concert for the Dylan, Cash, and the Nashville Cats A New Music City album.

After her 2016 marriage to John Carter Cash she began releasing music under the name Ana Cristina Cash, beginning with the country/Americana/rockabilly release The Tough Love EP in 2017, recorded at the Cash Cabin Studio in Tennessee with material co-written and -produced with John Carter Cash. She performed at the Rock and Roll Hall of Fame's 20th Anniversary Music Master concert tribute to Johnny Cash on 21 October 2016.

She recorded a full-length holiday album, My Christmas Collection, at the Cash Cabin studio. It was released in 2018. That year she provided guest vocals on heavy metal band DevilDriver's cover of "Ghost Riders in the Sky" and performed at the Johnny Cash Heritage Festival.

On 1 April 2019 she was a part of the Loretta Lynn birthday tribute show at the Bridgestone Arena in Nashville, and later that year she performed at YouTube's "Cash Fest" concert honoring Johnny Cash. On 9 November 2019 she made her Grand Ole Opry debut performing her original material. Mayor Jamie Clary of Hendersonville, Tennessee, declared 9 November "Ana Cristina Cash Day."

In 2019 a Spanish-language adaptation of Johnny Cash's "Folsom Prison Blues" co-written by Ana Cristina Cash was recorded by Los Tigres Del Norte for their prison documentary Los Tigres del Norte at Folsom Prison and the accompanying Latin Grammy-winning album.

She released another holiday-themed recording, a single of "Mele Kalikimaka," during the COVID-19 quarantine in 2020.

Her first full-length album as Ana Cristina Cash, Shine, was released on 24 April 2020. She wrote the songs in collaboration with John Carter Cash and others, drawing from blues, rock, country and Americana. Recorded at the Cash Cabin studio, it premiered at Billboard.com and includes the track "Brand New Pair Of Shoes" with lyrics by Johnny Cash that had never before been set to music. The same track was later included on an expanded edition of Forever Words, a Legacy Records album of poems and lyrics by Johnny Cash set to music by artists including Elvis Costello, Chris Cornell and Jewel.

She is a graduate of Nashville's 2020 Leadership Music Class.

== Awards and honors ==
2019: Winner, Wildbunch Film Festival Best Actress Award for Short Film "Dragon Song" as Veronica Shamblings

2011: Winner, Miss South Florida USA

2004: Norminated, Premio Lo Nuestro "Revelacion del Ano (Best New Artist of the Year)"

== Personal life ==
Cash married music producer John Carter Cash on October 29, 2016, in Charleston, South Carolina in the French Huguenot Church. Her husband is the only child of musicians Johnny Cash and June Carter Cash. They live with their two children in Nashville where they co-own and operate Cash Cabin Enterprises, a private recording studio.

== Discography ==
Album/Project	Year	Artist	Role(s)
Pilgrimage to Rising Fawn	2024	Norman Blake	Featured Artist/Lead Vocals & Background Vocals "Hi-Eenktum Daddy-O"
Songwriter	2024	Johnny Cash	Background Vocals "Hello Out There," "Spotlight"
Johnny Cash: Forever Words Expanded	2021	Ana Cristina Cash	Songwriter/Primary Artist "Brand New Pair of Shoes"
"Mele Kalikimaka"	2020	Ana Cristina Cash	Primary Artist/Background Vocals
Hey Crow!	2020	The Cash Collective	Lead Vocals/Background Vocals
Shine	2020	Ana Cristina Cash	Primary Artist/Songwriter/Background Vocals
Across Generations: The Carter Family	2019	The Carter Family	Lead Vocals/Featured Artist/Background Vocals
Los Tigres del Norte at Folsom Prison	2019	Los Tigres del Norte	Liner Note Translation/Musical Adaptation "La Prisión De Folsom"
"La Prisión De Folsom" (Folsom Prison Blues)	2019	Los Tigres del Norte	Musical Adaptation
Outlaws 'til the End, Vol. 1	2018	DevilDriver	Guest Artist "Ghostriders in the Sky"
Johnny Cash: Forever Words	2018	Brad Paisley	Background Vocals "Gold All Over the Ground"
Johnny Cash: Forever Words	2018	T Bone Burnett	Background Vocals "Jellico Coal Man"
My Christmas Collection	2018	Ana Cristina Cash	Primary Artist/Songwriter/Background Vocals
"Red Hot Kitchen"	2018	Ana Cristina Cash	Lead Vocals/Songwriter
"We Must Believe in Magic"	2018	John Carter Cash	Background Vocals
The Tough Love EP	2017	Ana Cristina Cash	Primary Artist/Songwriter/Background Vocals
Turquoise Trail: Soundtrack for a Western	2017	Justin Johnson	Vocals "Vaya Con Dios," "Pistolero," "Ghost Riders in the Sky"
White Christmas Blue	2016	Loretta Lynn	Production Assistant
The West Coast Sessions	2015	Ana Cristina Cash	Songwriter/Primary Artist/Background Vocals
Loco De Amor	2014	Juanes	Background Vocals "La Luz," "Loco de Amor"
En Español	2013	Natalie Cole	Background Vocals "Oye Como Va" (featuring Arthur Hanlon) [Medley]
Viver a Vida	2012	Mickael Carreira	Background Vocals
Un Nuevo Dia	2011	Jencarlos Canela	Background Vocals "All I Need Is Your Love"
You're Never Alone	2009	Gina Tarajano	Translation/Adaptation "The Privilege to Give"
Nuestra Navidad [Sony International]	2005	Various Artists	Primary Artist "Ave Maria"
Vivan Los Niños	2003	Various Artists	Primary Artist "Vivan Los Niños"
Ana Cristina	2003	Ana Cristina	Primary Artist
Vale Todo	2002	Various Artists	Primary Artist "A Un Paso De Mi Amor"
Take Me as I Am	2002	Janet Robin	Background Vocals
