= Murder in Coweta County =

1948 killing in U.S. state of Georgia

The murder in Coweta County was an April 1948 murder committed in Coweta County in the U.S. state of Georgia. A wealthy landowner in Meriwether County was pursued by the sheriff of neighboring Coweta County, Georgia. The events were the subject of two acclaimed works, both titled Murder in Coweta County: a 1976 book by Margaret Anne Barnes and a 1983 television movie on CBS starring Johnny Cash and Andy Griffith.

== History ==
John Wallace, a wealthy landowner, had virtually unlimited power in Meriwether County, Georgia. Even the sheriff, Hardy Collier, was under his control. Wilson Turner, a sharecropper tenant, attempted to do extra bootlegging work without Wallace's permission and was fired as a result. Turner retaliated by stealing two of Wallace's cows.

Turner was found and arrested in Carrollton, Georgia, by Chief of Police Rada Threadgill but was transferred from the Carrollton jail to the Meriwether County Jail in Greenville. Turner was later released from jail, purportedly because of a lack of evidence. As he left the jail, he discovered John Wallace waiting outside with his men. Realizing that he had been set up, Turner attempted to escape in his truck, with Wallace and his group in pursuit, two men each in two cars.

Turner's truck, drained of its fuel earlier, stopped running just past the county line at the Sunset Tourist camp in Moreland, Coweta County, Georgia. Multiple witnesses reported seeing Wallace pistol-whip Turner so hard that the gun discharged, then Turner going limp and being put in one of the cars. The group then returned to Meriwether County, where Turner's body was first hidden on Wallace's property, then burned in a pit, the ashes and bone fragments scattered in a nearby stream. Wallace forced two black field workers, Albert Brooks and Robert Lee Gates, to assist him in destroying the victim's body.

Since witnesses testified that the murder took place in Coweta County, the crime was under the jurisdiction of Lamar Potts, the Coweta County Sheriff. Potts and his deputies searched for days and then an informant told them that Wallace burned the body and implicated Brooks and Gates. Potts persuaded the two men to take him to the burn site. There were bone fragments found that the crime lab identified as human. Brooks and Gates also took the sheriff to the well where Turner's body had originally been deposited. Ruptured brain tissue was found, which was also identified as coming from a human being.

Wallace's trial received wide press coverage in the rural community. It was reported that Wallace's eccentric testimony led to his conviction. After several appeals, John Wallace was executed in the electric chair in 1950. His case was unusual because he was one of the richest men ever to be given a death sentence, and his case was the first in Georgia where a white man was given the death sentence upon the testimony of two black men. Mayhayley Lancaster, a local "seer" from nearby Heard County, also testified against Wallace.

Shortly after Wallace was sentenced to death, three of his accomplices, Henry Mobley, Herring Sivell, and Tom Strickland, all pleaded guilty to murder in exchange for life sentences. They were all paroled in 1955. Sheriff Hardy Collier, who was charged as an accessory to murder, died from a heart attack on July 12, 1948, while awaiting trial. The last two defendants, Albert Brooks and Robert Lee Gates, were both granted immunity as a reward for their testimony.

Murder in Coweta County
- First edition
- Author: Margaret Anne Barnes
- Language: English
- Genre: Non-fiction
- Publisher: Simon & Schuster
- Publication date: 1977
- ISBN: 0-88349-064-1

== Book ==
Murder in Coweta County (original ISBN 0-88349-064-1; re-issued in 1983 and 2004) was a 1976 book by Margaret Anne Barnes, originally published by Simon & Schuster in 1977. Though the book is generally considered accurate, Barnes' website has quoted the El Paso Times as calling it "the new fictionalized style of recording historic events".

No Remorse: The Rise and Fall of John Wallace (hardcover ISBN 978-1-58838-264-1), by Dot Moore, explores not only the fateful murder but also the events that brought Wallace to that point—the death of his father and his early exposure to making moonshine, among other events. It includes letters to and from Wallace in prison.

== Film ==
Murder in Coweta County is a 1983 television movie produced by Dick Atkins and Michael Lepiner, directed by Gary Nelson, and written by Dennis Nemec based on Barnes' book. Andy Griffith played landowner John Wallace and Johnny Cash played Sheriff Lamar Potts of Coweta County. Cash's wife, June Carter Cash, played the local seer, Mayhayley Lancaster. Noted Watergate-era attorney James F. Neal played one of the lawyers during the trial.

== See also ==
- Capital punishment in Georgia (U.S. state)
- List of people executed in Georgia (U.S. state) (pre-1972)
- List of people executed in the United States in 1950
