= Appalachian Pride =

Studio album by June Carter Cash
- Released: 1975
- Genre: Country
- Label: Columbia
- Producer: Johnny Cash

June Carter Cash chronology
Appalachian Pride (1975)	Press On (1999)

Appalachian Pride is the first solo album by June Carter Cash. It was released in 1975.

The entirety of the album's original sequence is included on the retrospective Keep on the Sunny Side: June Carter Cash - Her Life in Music. Her second solo album would not be released until 1999.

== Track listing ==
1. "Losin' You"
2. "The Shadow of a Lady"
3. "Gatsby's Restaurant"
4. "Once Before I Die"
5. "The L&N Don't Stop Here Anymore"
6. "East Virginia Blues"
7. "Gone"
8. "Appalachian Pride"
9. "I Love You Sweetheart"
10. "Another Broken Hearted Girl"
11. "Big Ball's in Nashville" (not released on original album)

== Personnel ==
- June Carter Cash - vocals
- Jerry Hensley - additional vocals on "Once Before I Die"
- Helen Carter - vocals, accordion
