= Ring of Fire (2013 film) =

- Genre: Biographical drama
- Based on: Anchored in Love: An Intimate Portrait of June Carter Cash by John Carter Cash
- Teleplay by: Richard Friedenberg
- Directed by: Allison Anders
- Starring: Jewel Kilcher; Matt Ross
- Music by: Anton Sanko
- Country of origin: United States
- Original language: English

Production
- Executive producers: Jonathan Koch; Steven Michaels
- Producer: Damian Ganczewski
- Cinematography: Joseph E. Gallagher
- Editors: Chris Figler; Aaron Rottinghaus
- Running time: 89 minutes
- Production company: Asylum Entertainment

Original release
- Network: Lifetime
- Release: May 27, 2013

Ring of Fire is a 2013 American biographical drama television film directed by Allison Anders and written by Richard Friedenberg. The film is about the life of June Carter Cash and Johnny Cash, and is based on their son John Carter Cash's 2007 book Anchored in Love: An Intimate Portrait of June Carter Cash. It stars Jewel Kilcher as June Carter Cash and Matt Ross as Johnny Cash. It aired on Lifetime on May 27, 2013, and was nominated for four Primetime Emmys in 2013, including Outstanding Directing for a Miniseries, Movie or a Dramatic Special.

== Plot ==
This is the story of the decades-long love affair between June Carter and her husband, Johnny Cash, a love that was stretched to the breaking point by Johnny's addiction to pills.

== Cast ==
- Jewel as June Carter Cash
- Matt Ross as Johnny Cash
- John Doe as A. P. Carter
- Frances Conroy as Maybelle Carter
- Austin M. Stack as John Carter Cash
- Wilbur Fitzgerald as Garreth Connor
- Mary Stewart Sullivan as young June Carter

== Reception ==
On the review aggregator website Rotten Tomatoes, 33% of 9 critics' reviews are positive.

== Accolades ==
Ceremony	Categories	Year	Result
Primetime Emmys	Outstanding Makeup Outstanding Music Composition Outstanding Directing Outstanding Hairstyling	2013	Nominated
