= Keep on the Sunny Side: June Carter Cash – Her Life in Music =

Compilation album by June Carter Cash
- Released: August 25, 2005
- Recorded: 1939–2003
- Genre: Country
- Label: Sony
- Producer: Various

June Carter Cash chronology
Louisiana Hayride (2003)	Keep on the Sunny Side: June Carter Cash – Her Life in Music (2005)	Church In The Wildwood: A Treasury Of Appalachian Gospel (2005)

Professional ratings
Review scores
Source	Rating
Allmusic	4.5/5 stars

Keep on the Sunny Side: June Carter Cash – Her Life in Music is a compilation album by June Carter Cash which spans from 1939 with The Carter Sisters and Mother Maybelle on the radio to her 2003 album Wildwood Flower. It was released in 2005.

== Track listing ==
Disk 1

1. "Keep on the Sunny Side"
2. "Oh Susannah"
3. "Root, Hog or Die"
4. "Baby, It's Cold Outside"
5. "Country Girl"
6. "Foggy Mountain Top"
7. "Fair and Tender Ladies"
8. "He's Solid Gone"
9. "Juke Box Blues"
10. "No Swallerin' Place"
11. "Love, Oh Crazy Love"
12. "He Went Slippin' Around"
13. "Well I Guess I Told You"
14. "Strange Woman"
15. "The Heel"
16. "How Did You Get Away from Me?"
17. "Tall Loverman"
18. "Without a Love to Call My Own"
19. "Ring of Fire"
20. "Keep on the Sunny Side"

Disk 2

1. "Jackson"
2. "If I Were a Carpenter"
3. "The Loving Gift"
4. "A Good Man"
5. "Ole Slewfoot"
6. "Losin' You"
7. "The Shadow of a Lady"
8. "Gatsby's Restaurant"
9. "Once Before I Die"
10. "The L&N Don't Stop Here Anymore"
11. "East Virginia Blues"
12. "Gone"
13. "Appalachian Pride"
14. "I Love You Sweetheart"
15. "Another Broken Hearted Girl"
16. "Song to John"
17. "The Far Side Banks of Jordan"
18. "Diamonds in the Rough"
19. "Will the Circle Be Unbroken?"
20. "Keep on the Sunny Side"

== Personnel ==
- June Carter Cash - Vocals & Autoharp
