= J. J. Blair =

American musician (born 1969)

- Born: October 15, 1969 (age 56)
- Genres: Rock
- Occupations: Engineer, producer, musician
- Instruments: Guitar, keyboards

J. J. Blair is a musical engineer, producer and musician who has worked with such artists as Johnny Cash, June Carter Cash, Rod Stewart and the Who. Blair produced and engineered June Carter Cash's 1999 Grammy Award-winning album "Press On". Blair was an engineer on Johnny Cash's 2005 box set The Legend and all of the first three Great American Songbook albums by Rod Stewart. Blair has also engineered songs for many artists, including Weezer, George Benson, Smokey Robinson, Unwritten Law, Lee Dewyze, Kelly Clarkson, P. Diddy, the Black Eyed Peas, Ryan Adams, Bird York, Stephen Bishop, David Cassidy, Melissa Etheridge and others.

Blair also played keyboards for the Who for one concert on November 8, 2006 in San Jose, California. Blair filled in for that concert for Brian Kehew, who had been filling in for regular keyboardist for the Who, John "Rabbit" Bundrick, who was away from the band to be with his ailing wife. Soundtrack credits include "Special Friend," written and produced with Bird York for the Magnolia Pictures feature Dumbstruck". J.J. Blair has a very active Instagram page which includes multi-track listening and analysis of famous songs.

== Discography ==
=== The Who ===
- Encore Series 2006 [November 8] (2006)
