= Mayhayley Lancaster =

American lawyer

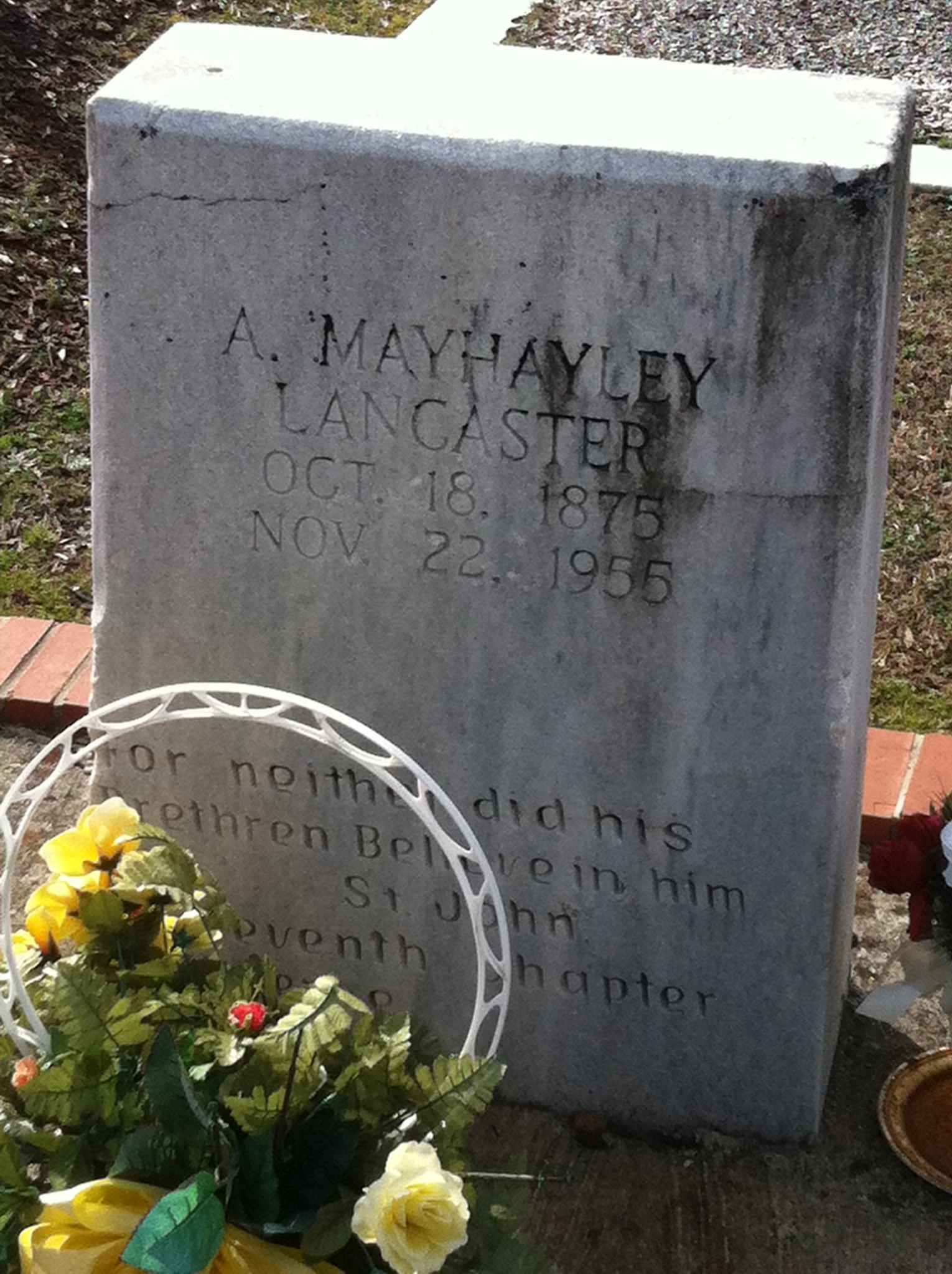
Mayhayley's grave Heard County GA

Mayhayley Lancaster (October 18, 1875 – November 22, 1955) was an American lawyer, political activist, midwife and teacher best known for having participated in two of Georgia's most high-profile murder trials, involving defendants Leo Frank in Marietta and John Wallace in Coweta County. She was involved in Leo Frank's defense and in the Wallace case as a witness for the prosecution.

== History ==
Born Amanda Mayhayley Lancaster, she grew up in Heard County, Georgia, where she lived for most of her life.

Mayhayley Lancaster was 39 years old in 1915, during the Leo Frank case. She was one of the few public voices in Georgia to defend Frank.

Thirty-two years later, in 1947, the 71-year-old Mayhayley Lancaster took part in the Wallace trial, later described in the book Murder in Coweta County. In the 1983 made-for-TV movie of the same name, she was portrayed as a local oracle by 54-year-old June Carter Cash. Cash's real-life husband, Johnny Cash, played the key role of the persistent sheriff Lamar Potts determined to bring to justice the arrogant John Wallace (Andy Griffith).

=== Political campaign ===
Lancaster ran for the Georgia legislature in 1926, the first woman to do so. She ran on a platform advocating roads and railroads into rural counties, public schools, and the passage of a law that mandated that doctors must deliver babies regardless of the family's ability to pay fees. She did not win, but some of her ideas were eventually carried out.

=== Death and legacy ===
Mayhayley Lancaster died Nov. 22, 1955. In addition to her legal, political and educational activities, she was also described as a noted fortune teller, numbers runner and self-proclaimed "Oracle of the Ages". She is buried in the cemetery at Caney Head Methodist Church.

== Books ==
Oracle of the Ages: Reflections on the Curious Life of Fortune Teller Mayhayley Lancaster (hardcover ISBN 978-1-58838-007-4; paperback ISBN 978-1-60306-008-0), by Dot Moore, is a biography of Mahayley Lancaster. The people who knew her reflect on her personality, her politics, and her passions, delving fully into Mayhayley lore and legend. Also included is information on Lancaster's role in the trial of John Wallace, subject of the book and movie Murder in Coweta County. Oracle of the Ages was the 2002 winner of the Lilla M. Hawes Award for the best book in Georgia county or local history.
