= Press On (June Carter Cash album) =

Studio album by June Carter Cash
- Released: 1999
- Genre: Country
- Label: Risk Records; Dualtone
- Producer: John Carter Cash; J.J. Blair

June Carter Cash chronology
Appalachian Pride (1975)	Press On (1999)	Wildwood Flower (2003)

Professional ratings
Review scores
Source	Rating
Rolling Stone	3.5/5 stars

Press On is the Grammy Award-winning second album by singer June Carter Cash. It was released in 1999 by the Risk Records label and then later re-released by the Dualtone label. The album is notable for including June Carter Cash performing her composition (co-written with Merle Kilgore) "Ring of Fire", which is more closely associated with her husband, Johnny Cash.

The album was produced by John Carter Cash (Johnny Cash & June Carter Cash's only son) and J. J. Blair.

== Track listing ==
1. "Diamonds in the Rough" (A. P. Carter)
2. "Ring of Fire" (June Carter Cash, Merle Kilgore)
3. "Far Side Banks of Jordan" (Terry Smith)
4. "Losin' You" (J. Carter Cash, Helen Carter)
5. "Gatsby's Restaurant" (J. Carter Cash, Rosie Carter)
6. "Wing of Angels" (J. Carter Cash)
7. "The L&N Don't Stop Here Anymore" (Jean Ritchie)
8. "Once Before I Die" (J. Carter Cash, Johnny Cash)
9. "I Used to Be Somebody" (J. Carter Cash)
10. "Tall Lover Man" (J. Carter Cash)
11. "Tiffany Anastasia Lowe" (J. Carter Cash)
12. "Meeting in the Air" (A. P. Carter)
13. "Will The Circle Be Unbroken?" (A. P. Carter)

== Personnel ==
- June Carter Cash – vocals, autoharp
- Johnny Cash – backing vocals
- Marty Stuart – acoustic guitar, mandolin, backing vocals
- Norman Blake – guitar, acoustic guitar & dobro
- Jason Carter – fiddle
- Rodney Crowell – acoustic guitar
- Dave Roe – bass guitar
- Rick Lonow – drums
- Hazel Johnson – mandolin
- Rosie Carter – backing vocals
- Benmont Tench – piano
- J. J. Blair – producer, engineer
