= Out Among the Stars =

Album by Johnny Cash

Studio album by Johnny Cash
- Released: March 25, 2014
- Recorded: March 18, 1981 – June 14, 1984, with overdubs in November 2013
- Studios: Columbia Studios (Nashville); 1111 Sound Studios (Los Angeles)
- Genre: Country
- Length: 36:37
- Labels: Columbia; Legacy
- Producers: Steve Berkowitz; John Carter Cash; Billy Sherrill
- Compiler: John Carter Cash

Johnny Cash chronology
| Johnny Cash: The Complete Columbia Album Collection (2012) | Out Among the Stars (2014) | Johnny Cash and the Royal Philharmonic Orchestra (2020) |

Singles from Out Among the Stars
- 1. "She Used to Love Me a Lot" Released: January 14, 2014; 2. "I'm Movin' On" Released: February 6, 2014; 3. "Baby, Ride Easy" Released: February 27, 2014; 4. "Out Among the Stars" Released: May 7, 2014

Out Among the Stars is the fourth posthumously released studio album (71st overall) by Johnny Cash. It was released on March 25, 2014, by Legacy Recordings. The recordings come from lost 1980s sessions with famed countrypolitan producer Billy Sherrill, which were shelved by Cash's record company, Columbia Records, and discovered by Cash's son John Carter Cash in 2012.

== Background ==
The album is composed of recordings made by Cash in 1981 and 1984 with producer Billy Sherrill for Columbia Records. The album was shelved by the label and was never released. In 2012, Cash's son, John Carter Cash, discovered the recordings in the archive and commissioned additional production to complete the album. Cash also recorded the 1981 album The Baron with Sherrill, in an attempt to turn around his dismal album sales, but the strategy did not work, leaving his record executives eager to end his affiliation with the label. The album is also a posthumous release for June Carter Cash, Johnny Cash's wife, who is featured on two tracks, and for Minnie Pearl and Waylon Jennings, who provide vocals on two other songs, "If I Told You Who It Was" and "I'm Movin' On", respectively.

Two of the tracks would later be rerecorded by Cash at American Recordings and would be released posthumously prior to earlier versions being included here; "I Came to Believe" appears on American V: A Hundred Highways, and a non-duet version of "I'm Movin' On" appears in the box set Unearthed.

In a March 2014 interview promoting the release of Out Among the Stars, John Carter Cash indicated that there may be as many as "four or five" albums worth of previously unreleased material from Cash's 1990s–2000s American label recording sessions, with Cash's last producer, Rick Rubin indicating at least one more such release is planned for the future.

== Release and promotion ==
Lead single "She Used to Love Me a Lot" was released on January 14, 2014, on the Rolling Stone website. "I'm Movin' On", featuring Waylon Jennings, was released as the second single and was premiered by CMT on February 6, 2014. The third single, "Baby, Ride Easy", a duet with June Carter Cash (which the two had performed on TV on Johnny Cash's 1985 Christmas Special) was premiered exclusively by One Country on February 27, 2014. The album's title track, "Out Among the Stars", was released as the fourth and final single, with its lyric video premiering on May 7, 2014.

== Critical reception ==
Professional ratings
Aggregate scores
| Source | Rating |
|---|---|
| Metacritic | 69/100 |
Review scores
| Source | Rating |
| AllMusic | 3.5/5 stars |
| Mojo | 3/5 stars |
| Rolling Stone | 3.5/5 stars |

According to the review aggregator Metacritic, Out Among the Stars received "generally favorable reviews" based on a weighted average score of 69 out of 100 from 21 critic scores. Prior to its release, Stereogum named it one of the most anticipated albums of 2014.

Stephen Thomas Erlewine of AllMusic wrote that Billy Sherrill "winds up simply sweetening Johnny without changing his core sound". He added that the album "is generally chipper and bright" and "one of Cash's stronger '80s albums".

Rob Tannenbaum's review in Rolling Stone mentions Cash's fading star power in the early 1980s amidst the "Urban Cowboy fad". Tannenbaum continued: "You might expect Out Among the Stars – a set of unreleased songs he cut with Sherrill in 1981 and 1984 – to be a contract-fulfilling sleepwalk. (Cash put out several mostly mediocre LPs in those years, but left this material unfinished; it was discovered after his death.) Instead, it proves that even at his most uninterested, Cash couldn't help but make a record with weight, moral complexity, and grim humor."

== Commercial performance ==
Released on March 25, 2014, Out Among the Stars debuted at #3 on the Billboard 200 and #1 on the Billboard Top Country Albums charts, selling 54,000 copies its first week. As of June 29, 2014, the album has sold 149,000 copies in the United States.

In the UK, the album debuted at #4 in the album chart. The album has sold 63,700 copies in the UK as of July 2014.

== Track listing ==
1. "Out Among the Stars" (Adam Mitchell) – 3:02
2. "Baby Ride Easy" (Richard Dobson) – 2:43
3. "She Used to Love Me a Lot" (Kye Fleming, Dennis Morgan, Charles Quillen) – 3:11
4. "After All" (Charles Cochran, Sandy Mason) – 2:47
5. "I'm Movin' On" (Hank Snow) – 3:09
6. "If I Told You Who It Was" (Bobby Braddock, Curly Putman) – 3:05
7. "Call Your Mother" (Cash) – 3:17
8. "I Drove Her Out of My Mind" (Gary Gentry, Hillman Hall) – 3:01
9. "Tennessee" (Rick Scott) – 3:27
10. "Rock and Roll Shoes" (Paul Kennerley, Graham Lyle) – 2:41
11. "Don't You Think It's Come Our Time" (Tommy Collins) – 2:17
12. "I Came to Believe" (Cash) – 3:29
13. "She Used to Love Me a Lot" (JC/EC Version) (Kye Fleming, Dennis Morgan, Charles Quillen) – 3:23
- Tracks 1–8, 10, 12, recorded in 1984
- Tracks 9, 11, recorded in 1981
- Track 13 originally recorded in 1984, remixed in 2013

== Personnel ==
Adapted from the liner notes.

Original session musicians

- Johnny Cash – vocals, guitar
- Pete Bordonali – guitar
- Jerry Carrigan – guitar
- June Carter Cash – duet vocals on "Baby Ride Easy" and "Don't You Think It's Come Our Time"
- Pete Drake – steel guitar
- Jerry Kennedy – guitar
- Waylon Jennings – duet vocals on "I'm Movin' On"
- Kenny Malone – drums
- Terry McMillan – harmonica
- Weldon Myrick – steel guitar
- Minnie Pearl – additional vocals on "If I Told You Who It Was"
- Hargus "Pig" Robbins – piano
- Billy Sanford – guitar
- Dale Sellers – guitar
- Henry Strzelecki – bass guitar
- Marty Stuart – guitar, mandolin
- John C. Williams – bass guitar
- Bobby Wood – piano
- Robert Wray – guitar

Additional musicians on 2013 sessions

- Niko Bolas – percussion
- Sam Bush – mandolin on "Don't You Think It's Come Our Time"
- Carlene Carter – background vocals on "Baby, Ride Easy"
- Laura Cash – fiddle
- Jerry Douglas – Dobro
- Mark Fain – upright bass on "Don't You Think It's Come Our Time"
- Tony Harrell – keyboards
- Rick Lonow – percussion
- Buddy Miller – guitar
- Pat McLaughlin – guitar
- Marty Stuart – guitar, mandolin
- Bryan Sutton – acoustic guitar and banjo on "Don't You Think It's Come Our Time"
- T. Blade – percussion

Additional backing vocals by the "Cash Cabin Vocal Group" and the full student body of Sumner Academy of Gallatin, Tennessee.

Technical personnel

- Steve Berkowitz – production (additional recording)
- Niko Bolas – mixing
- John Carter Cash – production (additional recording)
- Lou Robin – executive production
- Joseph M. Palmaccio – mastering
- Billy Sherrill – production (original sessions)
- Chuck Turner – engineering
- Nathan Yarborough – additional mixing

== Chart positions ==
=== Weekly charts ===
Weekly chart performance for Out Among the Stars
| Chart | Peak |
|---|---|
| Australian Albums (ARIA) | 4 |
| Austrian Albums (Ö3 Austria) | 2 |
| Belgian Albums (Ultratop Flanders) | 5 |
| Belgian Albums (Ultratop Wallonia) | 22 |
| Canadian Albums (Billboard) | 2 |
| Danish Albums (Hitlisten) | 7 |
| Dutch Albums (Album Top 100) | 2 |
| Finnish Albums (Suomen virallinen lista) | 16 |
| French Albums (SNEP) | 32 |
| German Albums (Offizielle Top 100) | 4 |
| Italian Albums (FIMI) | 11 |
| New Zealand Albums (RMNZ) | 10 |
| Norwegian Albums (VG-lista) | 6 |
| Polish Albums (ZPAV) | 13 |
| Scottish Albums (Official Charts) | 1 |
| South African Albums (RISA) | 9 |
| Spanish Albums (Promusicae) | 68 |
| Swedish Albums (Sverigetopplistan) | 3 |
| Swiss Albums (Schweizer Hitparade) | 1 |
| UK Albums (Official Charts) | 4 |
| UK Country Albums (Official Charts) | 1 |
| US Billboard 200 | 3 |
| US Top Country Albums (Billboard) | 1 |

=== Year-end charts ===
2014 annual chart performance for Out Among the Stars
| Chart | Position |
|---|---|
| Belgian Albums (Ultratop Flanders) | 82 |
| Swiss Albums (Schweizer Hitparade) | 31 |
| UK Albums (OCC) | 99 |
| US Billboard 200 | 132 |
| US Top Country Albums (Billboard) | 25 |

== Certifications ==
Certifications for Out Among the Stars
| Region | Certification | Certified units/sales |
|---|---|---|
| Switzerland (IFPI Switzerland) | Gold | 10,000^{^} |
| United Kingdom (BPI) | Silver | 60,000^{*} |
^{*} Sales figures based on certification alone.^{^} Shipments figures based on certification alone.

== See also ==
- 1981 in country music
- 1983 in country music
- 1984 in country music
- The New Basement Tapes, a supergroup also featuring Costello who completed songs with Bob Dylan lyrics and released them as Lost on the River: The New Basement Tapes in 2014
