= Wildwood Flower (album) =

Studio album by June Carter Cash
- Released: September 9, 2003
- Recorded: October 2002 – March 2003
- Genre: Country
- Label: Dualtone
- Producer: John Carter Cash

June Carter Cash chronology
Press On (1999)	Wildwood Flower (2003)	Keep on the Sunny Side: June Carter Cash - Her Life in Music (2005)

Professional ratings
Review scores
Source	Rating
AllMusic	4.5/5 stars
Rolling Stone	4/5 stars

Wildwood Flower is the fourth and final album from June Carter Cash. It was released in 2003 on the Dualtone record label, four months after her death and only a few days before the death of Johnny Cash, who provides backing vocals, making this the final release of his lifetime. It was produced by their son, John Carter Cash. The album's opening track, "Keep on the Sunny Side," was a Carter Family anthem that June Carter Cash had previously recorded twice with Johnny Cash: for the 1964 Carter Family album of the same title, and for the 1974 Johnny Cash album The Junkie and the Juicehead Minus Me. "The Road to Kaintuck," written by June, had previously been recorded by her husband on several occasions for Columbia Records. The medley of "Church in the Wildwood"/"Lonesome Valley" had been a regular part of Johnny Cash concerts in the 1970s. Cover artwork was created by Marc Burckhardt.

A recording of "Hold Fast to the Right" from these sessions was included on The Unbroken Circle: The Musical Heritage of the Carter Family.

== Track listing ==
1. "Keep on the Sunny Side" (A.P. Carter)
2. "The Road to Kaintuck"
3. (Carter Girls Intro: "Blue Ridge Mountains of Virginia") "The Kneeling Drunkard's Plea" (June Carter Cash, Helen Carter, Anita Carter & Mother Maybelle Carter)
4. "Storms Are on the Ocean" (A.P. Carter)
5. (Little Junie Intro) "Temptation"
6. (June's story about Lee Marvin) "Big Yellow Peaches" (June Carter Cash)
7. "Alcatraz"
8. "Sinking in the Lonesome Sea" (A.P. Carter)
9. "Church in the Wildwood" / "Lonesome Valley" (A.P. Carter)
10. "Cannonball Blues" (A.P. Carter)
11. "Will You Miss Me When I'm Gone?" (A.P. Carter)
12. "Anchored in Love" (A.P. Carter)
13. "Wildwood Flower" (A.P. Carter)

== Personnel ==
- June Carter Cash – vocals, autoharp
- Johnny Cash – vocals on "Road To Kaintuck" and "Temptation", backing vocals
- Laura Cash – fiddle, acoustic guitar, photography, violin, backing vocals
- John Carter Cash – art direction, producer
- Lorrie Carter Bennett – backing vocals
- Nancy Blake – cello, mandolin
- Norman Blake – acoustic guitar
- Carlene Carter – choir/chorus, backing vocals
- Janette Carter – vocals
- Joe Lee Carter – vocals, backing vocals
- Dennis Crouch – bass
- Dale Jett – acoustic guitar, vocals
- Rick Lonow – drums, percussion
- Tiffany A. Lowe – backing vocals
- Barbara Poole – bass

== Chart performance ==
Chart (2003)	Peak position
U.S. Billboard Top Bluegrass Albums	2
U.S. Billboard Top Country Albums	33
