= James F. Neal =

American trial lawyer (1929–2010)

James Neal
- Born: James Foster Neal; September 7, 1928; Oak Grove, Tennessee, U.S.
- Died: October 21, 2010 (aged 82); Nashville, Tennessee, U.S.
- Education: University of Wyoming (BA); Vanderbilt University (JD); Georgetown University (LLM)

James Foster Neal (September 7, 1928 – October 21, 2010) was an American trial lawyer who was best known for prosecuting labor leader Jimmy Hoffa and later top Nixon administration officials in connection with the Watergate scandal.

== Early life, education, early career ==
Neal was born on September 7, 1928, in Oak Grove, Tennessee, and grew up on a small tobacco and strawberry farm. Neal attended Sumner County High School in Portland, Tennessee, and played running back on the football team. He graduated from high school in the class of 1946. He attended the University of Wyoming on a football scholarship and was a running back on its 1950 undefeated team. After graduating from college, Neal served for two years in the United States Marine Corps. He graduated first in his law school class at Vanderbilt University Law School in 1957 and also earned a master's degree in tax law from Georgetown University in 1960. Neal then joined a Washington, DC law firm.

== Works for RFK, Hoffa prosecutions ==
Attorney General Robert F. Kennedy selected Neal in 1961 to lead a Justice Department investigation of Jimmy Hoffa, who was President of the Teamsters Union and a powerful political figure. After Hoffa's first trial on corruption charges ended in a hung jury, Neal led a second prosecution for jury tampering, which resulted in Hoffa's only federal conviction. According to The Washington Post, Neal took pride in saying "Jimmy Hoffa once called me the most vicious prosecutor who ever lived." Hoffa's prison sentence was later commuted by Richard Nixon. After the Hoffa prosecution, Neal was appointed the United States Attorney for the federal courts in Nashville, Tennessee.

== Private practice ==
In 1966, Neal became a Nashville, Tennessee-based trial attorney who litigated prominent cases around the country. In 1971, he and Aubrey Harwell, Jr. formed Neal & Harwell. The firm's emphasis was and continues to be on criminal and civil litigation.

Neal later won an acquittal of Elvis Presley's doctor, George Nichopoulos, who had been tried for improperly dispensing drugs that contributed to the singer's death in 1977. In 1980, Neal won an acquittal for Ford Motor Company when the company was charged with reckless homicide due to the faulty design of its Pinto model car, convincing jurors that the company was not negligent, despite the safety problems experienced with the Pinto. In 1985, Neal successfully defended Governor Edwin Edwards of Louisiana in a trial for racketeering.

== Watergate prosecutor, federal service ==
In 1973, special prosecutor Archibald Cox recruited Neal to investigate the Watergate scandal. Neal negotiated a guilty plea from former White House Counsel John Dean in October 1973, and then represented the prosecution in a 1974 criminal trial where former Attorney General John Mitchell and Presidential aides John D. Ehrlichman and H.R. Haldeman were convicted of conspiracy, perjury and obstruction of justice on January 1, 1975.

In the 1980s, Neal returned to federal service as a special investigator of the Abscam and Iran-Contra scandals.

== Additional high-profile cases ==
In 1985, Fortune magazine named Neal one of the United States' top trial lawyers. Neal defended film director John Landis in a manslaughter trial resulting from the death of actor Vic Morrow and two children during the 1982 filming of Twilight Zone: The Movie. Following this success, John Landis cast Neal (and his law partner James F. Sanders) as extras in the 1988 movie Coming to America. Neal represented Exxon Corporation after the 1989 Exxon Valdez oil spill in Alaska.

== Television actor ==
In addition to trial litigation, Neal did legal work for a number of Nashville-based country-western entertainers. One of his clients, Johnny Cash, cast him as a lawyer in the 1983 made-for-television movie Murder in Coweta County. Neal also played himself in Watergate, a 1994 television mini-series. Neal has been portrayed by others, such as J.C. MacKenzie in the Martin Scorsese film The Irishman.

== Death ==
Neal died at the age of 82 on October 21, 2010, in Nashville, Tennessee due to esophageal cancer. He was survived by widow Dianne Ferrell Neal, to whom he had been married for 20 years, three children, and five grandchildren.
