= Margaret Barnes (marine biologist) =

British marine biologist (1919–2009)

Margaret Barnes (26 August 1919 – 31 October 2009) was a British marine biologist.

She was born in Manchester and grew up in Wales and England. She received a BSc from the University of London in 1939. Originally trained in chemistry, during World War II, she worked on colloidal graphite lubricants. She received a MSc in 1945 from the University of London. Also in 1945, she married Harold Barnes, also a chemist who later pursued marine biology. Barnes and her husband came to be recognized as world authorities on barnacle biology. She moved to the Scottish Marine Biological Association (later the Scottish Association for Marine Science or SAMS) marine station at Millport to join her husband in 1945. The couple moved to a new marine station at Oban in 1967.

Barnes was awarded a DSc by the University of London in 1972. In 1976, she was named a fellow of the Royal Society of Edinburgh. She was named an honorary research fellow by SAMS in 1978. In 1980, she was named a fellow of the Institute of Biology.

Barnes was a founding member of the European Marine Biology Symposium and served as its president in 1988.

She was managing editor for Oceanography and Marine Biology: An Annual Review from 1978 to 1994 and an editor for the same journal from 1995 to 2002. She was also an editor for the Journal of Experimental Marine Biology and Ecology.

Barnes died in Oban at the age of 90 after an accident in her garden.
