= Juke Box Blues =

"Juke Box Blues" is a country music song performed by June Carter Cash, originally released in 1953 with Columbia Records. The song was written by Cash's mother, Maybelle Carter, and Cash's sister, Helen Carter. The song was one of Cash's few hits. Each stanza of the song has the same melody, followed by a short instrumental interlude played by the instrument(s) referred to in the previous stanza.

"Juke Box Blues" served as the B-side of the single, while "No Swallerin's Place" served as the record's A-side.

In the 2005 film Walk the Line, "Juke Box Blues" was sung by Reese Witherspoon.
