= Dot Moore =

- Born: Dorothy; May 15, 1914; Pensacola, Florida
- Died: May 23, 2007 (aged 93)
- Education: Leinkauf Elementary; Murphy High School
- Occupations: American television personality and "ambassador"
- Spouse: Robert Joseph Miller
- Children: 1

Dot Moore (May 15, 1914 – May 23, 2007) was an American television personality from Mobile, Alabama. Her broadcasting career included four talk shows, trips to the Eastern and Western coasts of the United States, and dozens of conversations with TV and motion picture stars.

== Early life ==
Dot Moore was born in 1914 in Pensacola, Florida. Her family moved to Mobile, Alabama when she was twelve years old. Dorothy "Dot" Fillette had a dedication to becoming an actress at a young age. One indication was her attempt at imitating movies such as those featuring Joan Crawford, which Dot viewed on days when she voluntarily skipped school.

Eventually, she concluded that theater didn't have a particular lure, even though she managed to perform on stage locally. Dot's interest in performing before taking an audience would resurface during her years on television. Before fulfilling her lifelong dreams, Moore would finish her schooling at Leinkauf Elementary and Murphy High School before her first job as a secretary close to her father, who was in the steamship business.

She next worked in the registrar's office at the University of Alabama Expansion Center, sharpening her future interview skills. While at the university, Dot was offered a place in the U.S. Army Corps of Engineers office in downtown Mobile and the U.S. Air Force office at Brookley Field. The investigative position at the Air Force office came shortly after she married Baltimore native Robert Joseph Miller. Her husband died from tuberculosis, leaving Dot and their two-year-old year son Bobby behind.

Following her husband's death, Dot opened "Dot's Dress Shoppe" on Springhill Avenue. There, Dot met the two women who would introduce her to the radio and television business: a radio personality going on vacation and Connie Bea Hope, who invited Dot to her television show. Five years after Bob Miller's death, Dot met her second husband, Lon Stephens Moore of Missouri, when a friend invited him to her Dauphin Street home. Again, illness would halt Dot's marriage, and the two people Mr. Moore knew very briefly were left alone again. Weeks after a period of mourning, Dot went back to work after finding a job at the same radio station that introduced her to broadcasting, WABB.

== The halfway point ==
Dot Moore was a receptionist at WABB in 1958, a position under the Mobile Register-owned station that would lead to speaking before a wide radio audience with her low-tone voice, earning the liking of one WABB announcer. Radio and TV commercials, including a televised March of Dimes public service announcement featuring Moore as a donor, would earn her something more than a year after working for WABB and WKAB radio, the daily half-hour program "Channel 10 Kitchen" on WALA-TV after the previous chef had to leave for health reasons. Dot, however, was not a cook.

WALA's solution was to find a professional chef and let Moore assist before the viewers. Dot also got the last remark in the program's live commercials sponsored by General Electric. Even after retirement, Dot was not very fond of cooking herself, yet up until the very end of her career, she was still seen speaking to her cooking guests in the studio kitchen. Dot managed to keep her son well-nourished on something as easy to prepare as tuna fish casserole, which Bobby sometimes would joke about. After finishing the cooking show contract, Dot returned to radio as a commercial copywriter in the WALA radio traffic department. There were also times when the TV side of the building called upon Dot for their commercials or public service spots. She was fired after a dispute with the new radio manager over paperwork that violated broadcasting rules in general. Termination gave Dot time to free-lance in media during the early 1960s.

In this busy period of trying to stay in Gulf Coast media and keeping things well at home, Dot was contacted by a WALA-TV announcer who wanted her to co-host the station's new program Poolside from the Admiral Semmes Hotel in downtown Mobile. Dot accepted the job and continued to expand her horizons, creatively and physically. After a successful run of Poolside, Dot returned to free-lancing, including some work for Gayfer's department store and their commercials for Pensacola station WEAR-TV. When Dot was getting ready to step out of the public eye after a week of commercials and public appearances in Pensacola, a friend employed at WALA stopped by the Gayfer's store to deliver her some good news. A new afternoon talk show of her very own was set to premiere the following Monday, with all of the guests already booked for that week.

Dot Moore began the show, Dot Moore & Company on Channel 10 in 1963. On May 14,1963, went on the air between noon and 12:30 pm. The radio manager who had fired Dot was eventually fired shortly after learning of her return from his TV counterpart. Viewers from south Mississippi to the Florida panhandle also got to see Dot help WALA cover Mobile's Mardi Gras Day celebration for 33 years. Ten years after Dot Moore & Company went on the air, Dot was given an on-air partner named Danny Treanor, and the show became known as Gulf Coast Today in 1973. The 9:00 a.m. program following NBC's Today continued with this format for the next four years until Dot regained the position of host and producer.

In September 1979, Gulf Coast Today began airing once a week before it bore Dot's name again. The Dot Moore Show would remain on WALA's schedule well into the 21st century.

== Later years ==
During the 1990s, Moore's Sunday community service program and fourth incarnation had a greater focus on public affairs figures than interviews with the stars. Despite her lessening presence over WALA-TV, which swapped its 43-year affiliation with NBC for Fox in 1996, Dot continued to tell people about her days of traveling outside Mobile, Alabama. Hundreds of photos featuring her and the people she had met over the years served as a visual aid. Longtime viewers noticed various changes in Dot's hairstyle and color since appearing on television. During her years under the eyes of sponsors, there were times when they wanted a blonde, brunette, or redheaded lady on the air. Dot would pay for her own hairstyle around 1994. Another surprise Dot had for her viewers was a pair of knee-high boots from California, which had the WALA switchboard lit up by those interested in her footwear.

== Final years and Death ==
The Dot Moore Show went on the air for the last time on July 11, 2004, less than a week after Moore had a car accident. According to many Mobile residents, including friend and fellow local media personality Uncle Henry, this accident was the reason for Dot's retirement and move to Montgomery, Alabama.

Moore died in 2007 at the age of 93. The US Representative Jo Bonner honored Moore in the Congressional Record.
