= Margaret Anne Barnes =

American writer (1927–2007)

- Born: July 24, 1927; Newnan, Georgia, U.S.
- Died: October 11, 2007 (aged 80); Atlanta, Georgia, U.S.
- Education: Georgia College; University of Georgia
- Occupation: Writer
- Notable work: Murder in Coweta County

Margaret Anne Barnes (July 24, 1927 – October 11, 2007) was an American writer born in Newnan, Georgia.

After attending Georgia College she studied journalism at the University of Georgia in Athens. As a reporter for the Newnan Times-Herald, Barnes became interested in the 1948 case of John Wallace's murder of one of his tenant farmers. This interest led to her book Murder in Coweta County which won an Edgar Allan Poe Award for an outstanding fact-crime study from the Mystery Writers of America. Murder in Coweta County was published in 1976 and made into a television movie starring Andy Griffith and Johnny Cash in 1983.

Barnes' second book, A Buzzard is My Best Friend, was published in 1981. A Buzzard is My Best Friend was autobiographical and dealt with her life in Virginia as a farmer, and earned Barnes a Georgia Author of the Year Award. Her third book, The Tragedy and the Triumph of Phenix City, Alabama, dealt with corruption and crime in Phenix City, Alabama, which is across the Chattahoochee River from Columbus, Georgia.

Barnes died October 11, 2007, at Emory University Hospital in Atlanta of emphysema. She was 80 years old.

== Writings ==
- Murder in Coweta County (1976) ISBN 978-0882894195
- A Buzzard is My Best Friend (1981) ISBN 978-0865547131
- The Tragedy and the Triumph of Phenix City, Alabama (1998) ISBN 978-0881464184
