= Merle Kilgore =

American singer-songwriter

- Also known as: Merle Kilgore
- Born: Wyatt Merle Kilgore; August 9, 1934; Chickasha, Oklahoma, U.S.
- Died: February 6, 2005 (aged 70) Mexico
- Genre: Country
- Occupation: Singer-songwriter
- Instrument: Acoustic guitar
- Years active: 1948–2005
- Labels: Starday, MGM, Epic, Columbia, K-Tel, BEAR Family
- Website: Merlekilgore.com

Wyatt Merle Kilgore (August 9, 1934 – February 6, 2005) was an American singer, songwriter, and manager. Born in Chickasha, Oklahoma, he was raised in Shreveport, Louisiana. At the time of his death, he was the personal manager of Hank Williams Jr.

== Early life ==
Although born in Chickasha, Oklahoma, United States, Kilgore was raised in Shreveport, Louisiana. He was the son of Wyatt and Gladys B. (Clowers) Kilgore. As a boy of 14 he carried the guitar for Hank Williams at the Louisiana Hayride, beginning a close relationship with the Williams family that would last three generations. He attended school at C. E. Byrd High School and then Louisiana Tech University.

== Career ==
Kilgore became the principle guitarist on the Hayride at just 16 years old. At 18, he penned his first Number 1 and Million seller, More and More, recorded by Webb Pierce. He went on to a career as a country music recording artist but had great success as a songwriter, co-writing with June Carter the song "Ring of Fire", first recorded by her sister Anita Carter and later by June's future husband, Johnny Cash (Kilgore was a distant cousin of the Carter sisters through their maternal grandmother, Margaret Kilgore Addington); June, later known as June Carter Cash, would record her own version of the song for her album Press On, released in 1999. He also co-wrote Claude King's big crossover hit, "Wolverton Mountain". Amongst others, he also penned "Johnny Reb" for Johnny Horton and the Tommy Roe pop music hit, "The Folk Singer". In the early 1960s, he toured with Cash as part of his package show. He stood as Johnny Cash's best man at his wedding to June Carter.

== Business and music interests ==
A resident of Paris, Tennessee, from 1986, he was also a prominent member of the business community. On April 7, 1986, he was named Executive Vice President and head of management of Hank Williams Jr. Enterprises. In addition to managing Hank Williams Jr's career (along with that of Hank Jr's Bama Band), Kilgore managed a number of Artists from his Nashville office, including Robyn Young and Joe Sins.

Kilgore also had a number of successful business ventures and held numerous leadership positions. Kilgore's prominence in the country music community had grown through his involvement as Vice President of the Country Music Association, and he had served on the CMA board of directors. Also contributing to his success was his position as President of both the Nashville Songwriter's Foundation as well as the Nashville Songwriter's Association International. In 1987, he was named an honorary State Senator for Tennessee. In 1993, Kilgore was inducted into the Louisiana Hall of Fame in Lafayette, Louisiana, and into Shreveport's Byrd High School Hall of Fame. In 1998, Kilgore received the Legendary Songwriters' Award from the North American County Music Association. He hosted and performed at NSAI's Tin Pan South Legendary Songwriter's Acoustic Concert and was presented an award honoring him as "one of the world's outstanding songwriters." Kilgore had also served two terms as President of ROPE, International (Reunion of Professional Entertainers, Int.).

== Organizations and honors ==
Kilgore was a long-time member of the Academy of Country Music and an active member of the Screen Actors Guild. As well as belonging to the NSAI and the American Federation of Musicians, he served as a board member for several organizations including the Hank Williams Museum in Montgomery, Alabama, the Texas Country Music Hall of Fame and the Tex Ritter Museum, both in Carthage, Texas. He also directed the operations of two offices, Hank Williams Jr. Enterprises in Paris, Tennessee and Merle Kilgore Management in Nashville, where he managed several other artists. In 1998, Kilgore was inducted into the Nashville Songwriters Hall of Fame. In 2004, Kilgore was inducted into the Oklahoma Music Hall of Fame.

== Death ==
On February 6, 2005, Merle Kilgore died from heart failure while in a Mexican hospital undergoing experimental treatments for lung cancer, and was interred in Hendersonville Memory Gardens in Hendersonville, Tennessee. Kilgore was survived by his wife, Judy, three daughters, two sons, eight grandchildren and a great granddaughter.

== Singles ==
Year	Single	US Country
1960	"Dear Mama"	6
1960	"Love Has Made You Beautiful"	10
1960	"Getting Old Before My Time"	29
1962	"A Girl Named Liz" / "Trouble at the Tower"	
1967	"Fast Talking Louisiana Man"	71
1974	"Montgomery Mable"	95
1982	"Mister Garfield"	54
1984	"Just Out of Reach"	74
1985	"Guilty"	92
