= John Carter Cash =

American singer, author, songwriter and producer (born 1970)

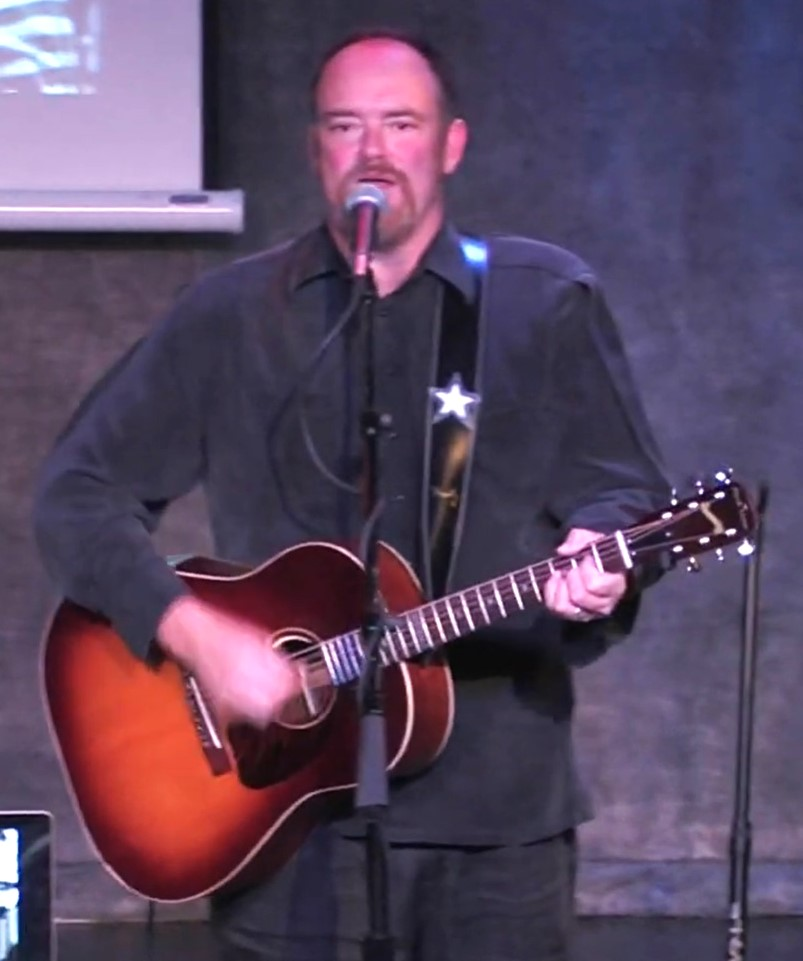
- Cash performing in 2015

Background information
- Born: March 3, 1970 (age 56)
- Genre: Country
- Occupations: Singer-songwriter; musician; record producer; film producer
- Instruments: Vocals; guitar
- Years active: 1985–present
- Labels: Vocalion; Decca; Victor; American; House of Cash
- Spouse: Ana Cristina Cash (m. 2016)

John Carter Cash (born March 3, 1970) is an American country singer-songwriter, musician and author. He is the only child of Johnny Cash and his second wife June Carter Cash.

== Biography ==
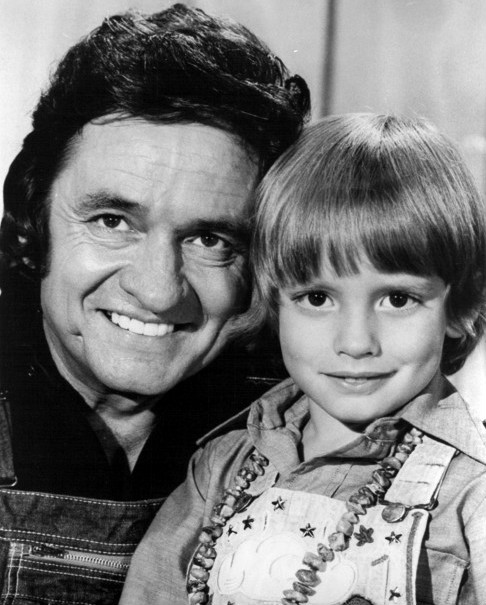
With his father, c. 1975

John has four older half-sisters from his father's first marriage to Vivian Cash (née Liberto). They are Rosanne, Kathy, Cindy, and Tara.

He also has two older half-sisters from his mother's previous marriages, singers Carlene Carter and Rosie Nix.

For several years after John's birth, his father altered the conclusion of "A Boy Named Sue" to mention the boy by name. In 1972 his parents recorded the duet "I Got a Boy (And His Name is John)" about their son. In 1975 a photograph of him with his father was featured on the sleeve of the album Look at Them Beans.

Like many of his siblings, John Cash followed his parents into show business. He has worked as a singer-songwriter, musician, and producer. He was music producer on his mother's albums Press On and Wildwood Flower; the latter won a Grammy Award for Best Traditional Folk album.

He was the associate producer of his father's American III: Solitary Man and American IV: The Man Comes Around. In the early 1990s he toured with his father as a rhythm guitarist.

He has also produced recordings for such artists as: Sheryl Crow, Loretta Lynn, Willie Nelson, Elvis Costello, Kris Kristofferson, Emmylou Harris, and Vince Gill. He owns and operates Cash Cabin Enterprises, LLC., a music production company in the Cash Cabin Studio.

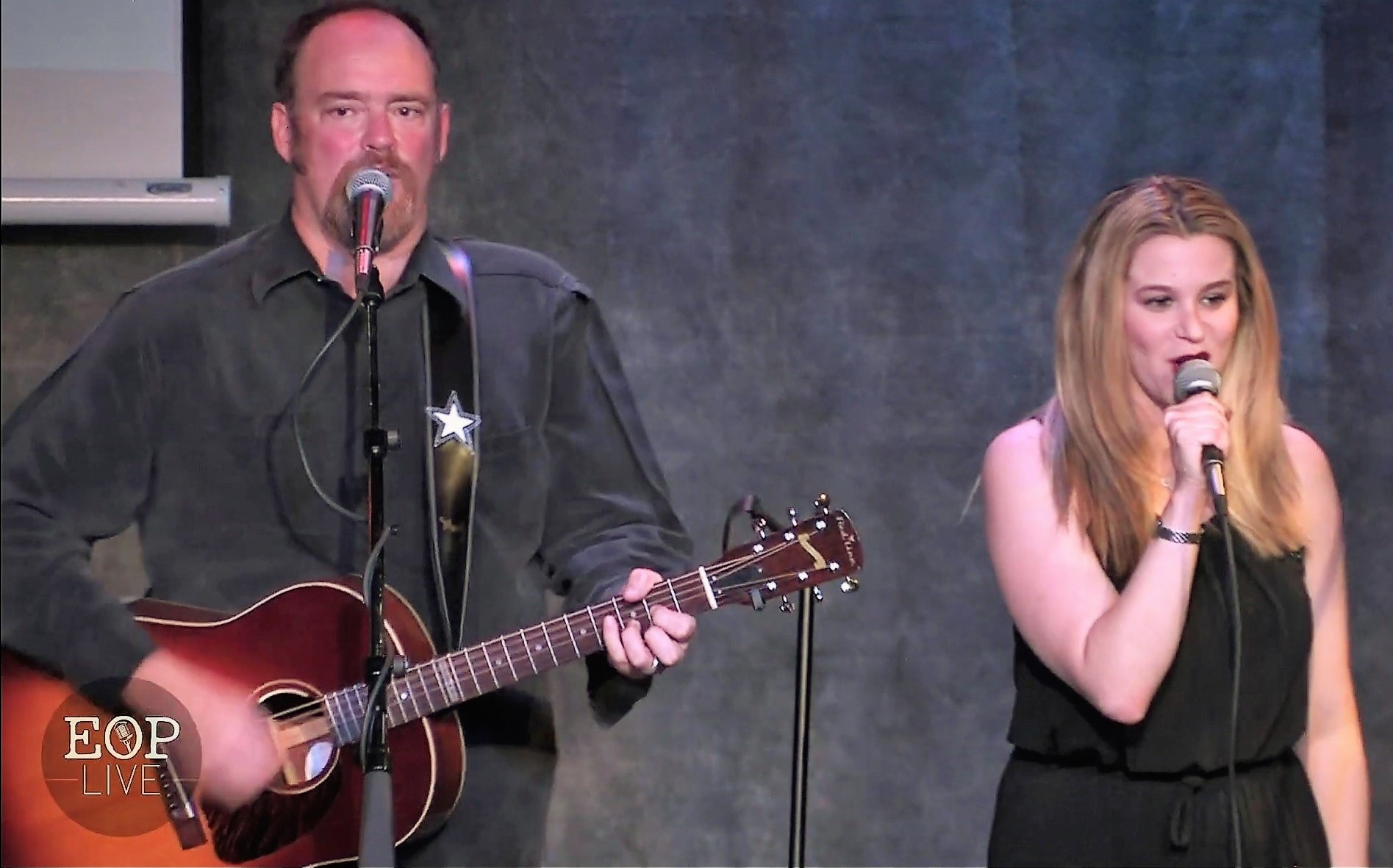
John Carter Cash and Ana Cristina Cash sing

== Marriage and family ==
He married Ana Cristina Cash, a singer, in 2016 in Charleston, South Carolina. They have two children, Grace June and James Kristoffer.

Cash also has three older children, Joseph John, Anna Maybelle and Jack Ezra, from two previous marriages that ended in divorce.

== Discography ==
=== As solo artist ===
Title	Album details
Bitter Harvest	Released: 2003; Label: AGR Television/Universal
The Family Secret	Released: 2010; Label: Cash House Records
We Must Believe In Magic	Released: 2018; Label: Reviver Records

=== With Carter Family III ===
Title	Album details
Past & Present	Released: 2010; Label: Cash House Records

== Filmography ==
Year	Title	Role	Notes
1973	Sesame Street	Himself	
1986	Stagecoach	Billy Pickett	Also stars parents Johnny Cash and June Carter Cash
2005	Walk the Line	Bob Neal	Uncredited; Also executive producer

== Books ==
Cash has written books about his parents:

- Anchored in Love: an intimate portrait of June Carter Cash, Thomas Nelson, 2007
- House of Cash: the legacies of my father Johnny Cash, Insight Editions, 2011
- Cash and Carter family cookbook: recipes and recollections from Johnny and June's table, Thomas Nelson, 2018

He also has written children's books:

- Momma Loves Her Little Son, Little Simon Inspirations, 2009
- Daddy Loves His Little Girl, Little Simon Inspirations, 2010
- The Cat in the Rhinestone Suit, Little Simon Inspirations, 2012
- Lupus Rex, a novel, Ravenstone, 2013.

== See also ==
- House of Cash
