= June Carter Cash =

American singer (1929–2003)

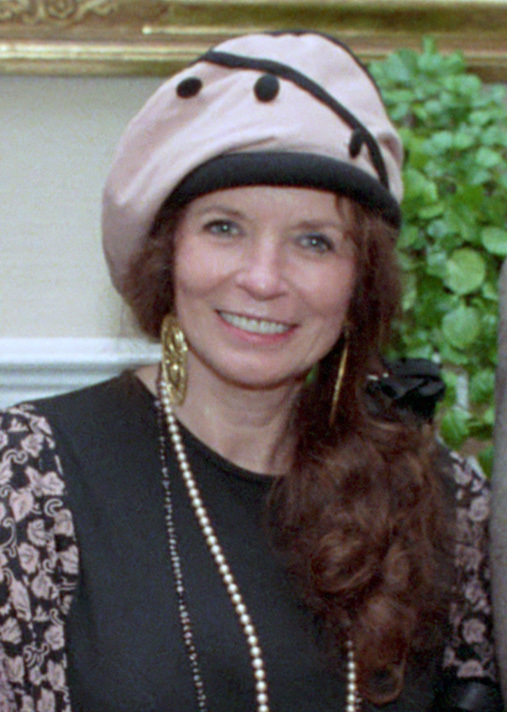
- Carter Cash in 1988

Background information
- Born: Valerie June Carter; June 23, 1929; Maces Spring, Virginia, U.S.
- Died: May 15, 2003 (aged 73) Nashville, Tennessee, U.S.
- Genres: Country; folk; Americana; gospel; Appalachian; country folk; rockabilly
- Occupations: Singer; songwriter; actress
- Instruments: Vocals; guitar; banjo; harmonica; autoharp; piano
- Years active: 1939–2003
- Labels: American; House of Cash; Decca; Legacy
- Spouses: Carl Smith (m. 1952; div. 1956) Edwin "Rip" Nix (m. 1957; div. 1966) Johnny Cash (m. 1968)

Valerie June Carter Cash (June 23, 1929 – May 15, 2003) was an American country singer, songwriter, comedian, actress, and author. A five-time Grammy Award winner, she was a member of the Carter Family and the second wife of singer Johnny Cash. Before her marriage, she performed as June Carter, a name she continued to use professionally, including on songwriting credits. She played guitar, banjo, harmonica, and autoharp, and acted in several films and television shows. In 2009, she was posthumously inducted into the Christian Music Hall of Fame, and in 2025, she was named a posthumous inductee into the Country Music Hall of Fame.

== Early life ==
Valerie June Carter was born on June 23, 1929, in Maces Spring, Virginia, to Maybelle (née Addington) and Ezra Carter. Her mother performed country music with her sister-in-law Sara and brother A. P. Carter. Carter began performing with the Carter Family at age 10, in 1939.

In March 1943, when the Carter Family trio stopped recording at the end of the WBT contract, Maybelle, encouraged by her husband Ezra, formed "The Carter Sisters and Mother Maybelle." Helen played accordion, Anita played bass fiddle, and Carter played autoharp and served as front person and comedian. The group first aired on WRNL in Richmond, Virginia, on June 1. Doc Addington and Carl McConnell, Maybelle's brother and cousin, known as "The Virginia Boys", joined them in late 1945.

At 16, Carter was a co-announcer with Ken Allyn and read commercials for Red Star Flour, Martha White, and Thalhimers Department Store. In 1946, the Carters and Doc and Carl performed show dates within driving distance of Richmond, across Virginia, Maryland, Delaware, and Pennsylvania. Carter attended John Marshall High School during this period. She later said she had to work harder at her music than her sisters, but she had her own special talent: comedy. A highlight of the road shows was her "Aunt Polly" routine. With her thin, lanky frame, she often played a comedic foil alongside Opry stars Faron Young and Webb Pierce. Carl McConnell wrote that Carter was "a natural-born clown, if there ever was one". She revived Aunt Polly for the 1976 TV Johnny Cash & Friends.

After Doc and Carl left the music business in late 1946, Maybelle and her daughters moved to Sunshine Sue Workman's "Old Dominion Barn Dance" on WRVA in Richmond. They later moved to WNOX in Knoxville, Tennessee, where they met Chet Atkins while working with Homer and Jethro.

In 1949, the Carter Sisters and Mother Maybelle, with Atkins as lead guitarist, lived in Springfield, Missouri, and performed regularly at KWTO. Ezra declined repeated offers from the Grand Ole Opry to move the act to Nashville because the Opry would not allow Atkins to accompany them onstage. Studio musicians feared Atkins would displace them as a first‑call player. In 1950, Opry management relented, and the group, with Atkins, joined the Opry. The family befriended Hank Williams and Elvis Presley, and Carter met Johnny Cash.

During the 1960s and 1970s, Carter and her sisters, with Maybelle and Sara joining at times, reclaimed the name "The Carter Family" for their act.

== Personal life ==
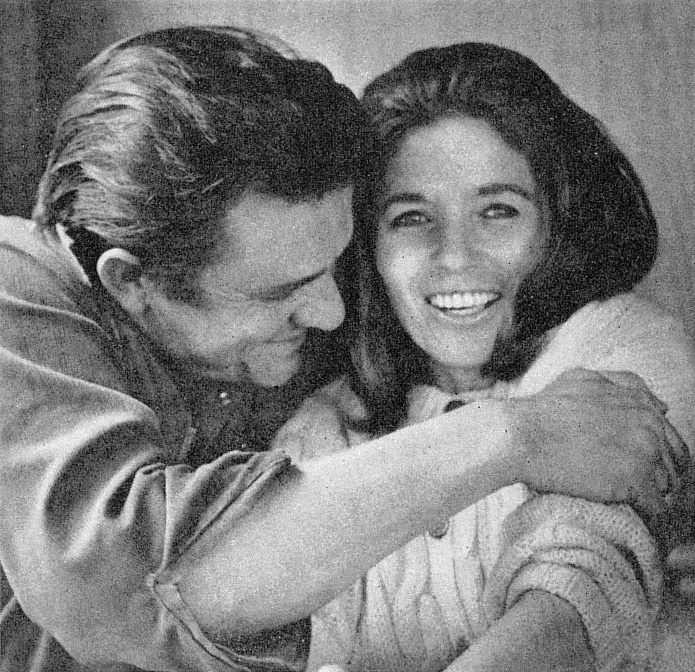
Johnny Cash and June Carter Cash in 1969

Carter was married three times and had one child with each husband. All three of her children went on to have successful careers in country music. She married her first husband, country singer Carl Smith, on July 9, 1952; they divorced in 1956. Together they wrote "Time's A-Wastin". They had a daughter, Rebecca Carlene Smith, known professionally as Carlene Carter, a country musician.

Carter married her second husband, Edwin "Rip" Nix, a police officer and former football player, on November 11, 1957. Their daughter, Rosie Nix Adams, was born on July 13, 1958, and became a country and rock singer. The couple divorced in 1966 because of Carter's affair with Johnny Cash.

Carter and the entire Carter Family had performed with Johnny Cash for a number of years. In 1968, Cash proposed to Carter during a live performance at the London Ice House, then known as "Treasure Island Gardens", or simply "The Gardens", in London, Ontario. They married on March 1 in Franklin, Kentucky. They had one son, John Carter Cash, who became a musician, songwriter, and producer. The couple remained married until her death in May 2003, four months before Cash died.

She also gained four stepdaughters from Cash's previous marriage to Vivian Liberto, including Cindy and Rosanne.

Carter's distant cousin, 39th U.S. president Jimmy Carter, became closely acquainted with Cash and Carter and maintained their friendship throughout their lifetimes. In a June 1977 speech, Jimmy acknowledged that Carter was his distant cousin.

Carter also had close relationships with a number of entertainers, including Audrey Williams, James Dean, Patsy Cline, Loretta Lynn, Jessi Colter, Kris Kristofferson, Willie Nelson, Elvis Presley, Robert Duvall, and Roy Orbison.

At the end of her life, she and her husband attended the First Baptist Church in Hendersonville, Tennessee.

=== Death ===
In April 2003, Carter Cash was diagnosed with a leaky heart valve, and doctors told her that valve replacement surgery was the only solution. She had the surgery on May 7; however, complications arose, and her health deteriorated rapidly over the next few days. She died on May 15, 2003 at age 73. Public funeral services were held at the First Baptist Church in Hendersonville, Tennessee. At Carter Cash's funeral, her stepdaughter Rosanne Cash stated, "If being a wife were a corporation, June would have been a CEO. It was her most treasured role."

Johnny Cash died of complications from diabetes on September 12. Carter Cash's daughter, Rosie Nix Adams, died from accidental carbon monoxide poisoning in a school bus that had been converted into a campervan, on October 24, at age 45. All three are buried at Hendersonville Memory Gardens near their home in Hendersonville, Tennessee.

== Career highlights ==
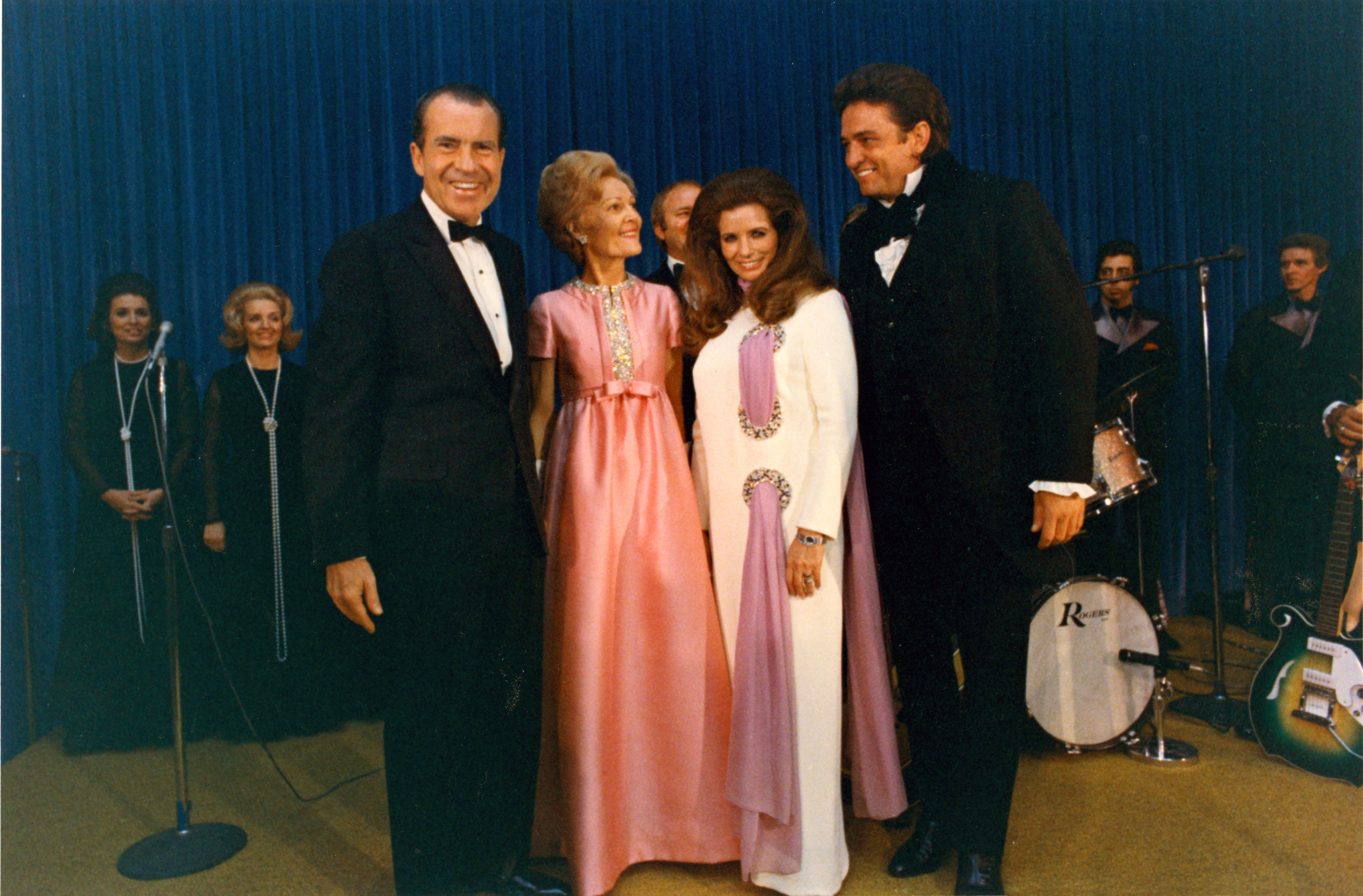
Cash with husband Johnny, President Richard Nixon and First Lady Pat Nixon on April 17, 1970

While Carter Cash may be best known for singing and songwriting, she was also an author, dancer, actress, comedian, philanthropist, and humanitarian. Director Elia Kazan saw her perform at the Grand Ole Opry in 1955 and encouraged her to study acting. She trained with Lee Strasberg and Sanford Meisner at the Neighborhood Playhouse School of the Theatre in New York. Her acting roles included Mrs. "Momma" Dewey in Robert Duvall's 1998 movie The Apostle, Sister Ruth, wife to Johnny Cash's character Kid Cole, on Dr. Quinn, Medicine Woman (1993–97), and Clarise on Gunsmoke in 1957. She was notable as Mayhayley Lancaster, appearing alongside Cash in the 1983 television movie Murder in Coweta County. Carter Cash was also Momma James in The Last Days of Frank and Jesse James. She appeared in occasional comedy skits on various Johnny Cash television programs.

As a singer, she had both a solo career and a career singing with first her family and later her husband. As a solo artist, she found success with upbeat country songs of the 1950s, including "Jukebox Blues" and the comedic hit "No Swallerin' Place" by Frank Loesser. She also recorded "The Heel" in the 1960s, along with many other songs.

In the early 1960s, Carter wrote the "Ring of Fire", which later became a hit for her future husband, Johnny Cash. She co-wrote the song with Merle Kilgore. Carter wrote the lyrics about her relationship with Cash and offered the song to her sister, Anita Carter, who was the first to record it. In 1963, Cash recorded the song with the Carter Family singing backup and added mariachi horns. The song became a number-one hit and one of the most recognizable songs in country music. In her autobiography, I Walked the Line, Cash's first wife, Vivian Cash, disputes Carter's co‑writing credit. Vivian relates the story Cash told her in 1963: he wrote the song with Kilgore and Curly Lewis while fishing and planned to give Carter half credit because "[s]he needs the money. And I feel sorry for her."

Carter's first notable studio performance with Johnny Cash occurred in 1964, when she sang a duet with him on "It Ain't Me Babe", a Bob Dylan composition released as both a single and on Cash's album Orange Blossom Special. In 1967, the two found greater success with their recording of "Jackson", followed by a collaboration album, Carryin' On with Johnny Cash and June Carter. All these releases predated her marriage to Cash, after which she changed her professional name to June Carter Cash. She continued to work with Cash on recordings and on stage for the rest of her life, recording numerous duets for his albums and appearing regularly on The Johnny Cash Show from 1969 to 1971 and on his annual Christmas specials. After Carryin' On, Carter Cash recorded one more collaboration album, Johnny Cash and His Woman, released in 1973, and, along with her daughters, was a featured vocalist on Cash's 1974 album The Junkie and the Juicehead Minus Me. She also shared sleeve credit with her husband on a 2000 small-label gospel release, Return to the Promised Land.

Although she provided vocals on many recordings and shared billing with Cash on several album releases, Carter Cash recorded only three solo albums during her lifetime: Appalachian Pride,(1975), Press On (1999), and Wildwood Flower, released posthumously in 2003 and produced by her son. Appalachian Pride is the only one of the three on which Johnny Cash does not perform, while Press On is notable for featuring Carter singing her original arrangement of "Ring of Fire".

One of her final appearances was a non-speaking, non-singing role in the music video for her husband's 2003 single "Hurt", filmed a few months before her death. One of her last public appearances was on April 7, 2003, just over a month before her death, when she appeared on the CMT Flameworthy awards program to accept an achievement award on behalf of her husband, who was too ill to attend.

Because she provided backing vocals on many of her husband's recordings, a further posthumous release occurred in 2014, when Out Among the Stars was released under Cash's name. The album consists of previously unreleased recordings from the early 1980s, including two on which Carter Cash provides duet vocals.

=== Awards ===
Carter and Cash reached number 2 on the U.S. Country charts with their 1967 duet "Jackson". Their performance won the 1968 Grammy Award for Best Country & Western Performance, Duet, Trio or Group. They won the 1971 Grammy Award, for Best Country Vocal Performance by a Duo or Group for their 1970 duet "If I Were a Carpenter".

Carter Cash won the 2000 Grammy Award, for Best Traditional Folk Album for her 1999 album Press On. The album reached the top 15 on the Americana chart. Her final album, Wildwood Flower, was released posthumously in 2003. It contains bonus video enhancements showing extracts from the film of the recording sessions, which took place at the Carter Family estate in Hiltons, Virginia, on September 18–20, 2002. Carter Cash won the 2004 Grammy Award for Best Traditional Folk Album, and she also won the 2004 Grammy Award for Best Female Country Vocal Performance for the single "Keep on the Sunny Side".

=== Philanthropy ===
Carter Cash and Cash supported SOS Children's Villages throughout her lives. She and Cash began their involvement in 1973 when they donated US$12,000 (equivalent to $87,031 in 2025) to build an orphanage in a Jamaican village close to their home in that country. They visited the nearby village during their time in Jamaica, playing with the children and singing to them. When Cash died in 2003, their family asked that donations be made to SOS Children’s Villages because of the couple’s long association with the charity. A representative of Prime Minister P. J. Patterson later noted their contributions to Jamaica, stating, "A philanthropist extraordinaire, Mrs. Cash made Jamaica her second home and loved and cared deeply for the people of her adopted country. A gifted and talented singer, she and her husband, Johnny Cash, used the very talents for the benefit of many charities in and around Montego Bay."

== Legacy ==
In 2003, Country Music Television included her on their list of the "40 Greatest Women of Country Music".

Carter Cash was played by Reese Witherspoon in Walk the Line, a 2005 biographical film about Johnny Cash (played by Joaquin Phoenix). The film focused on the development of their relationship over 13 years, from their first meeting to her acceptance of his proposal. Witherspoon performed all vocals for the role, singing many of Carter Cash's famous songs, including "Juke Box Blues" and "Jackson" with Phoenix. Witherspoon won an Academy Award, Golden Globe, BAFTA, and Screen Actors Guild Award for Best Actress in the role.

She was inducted into the Christian Music Hall of Fame in 2009.

Musician and actress Jewel portrayed Carter Cash in the Lifetime television movie Ring of Fire, which aired on May 27, 2013. The film is based on her son's memoir Anchored in Love: An Intimate Portrait of June Carter Cash.

She was played by Erin Beute in the 2019 television movie Patsy & Loretta.

A 2024 documentary film, June, directed by Kristen Vaurio, showcased her life, career, and impact through archival footage and interviews of contemporaries such as Willie Nelson, Dolly Parton, Robert Duvall and Emmylou Harris. Carlene Carter and John Carter Cash served as executive producers. The film was nominated for Best Music Film at the 2025 Grammy Awards.

On March 25, 2025, Carter Cash was named a member-elect to the Country Music Hall of Fame as a Veterans Era Artist, recognizing her contributions over her 60-year career. She was officially inducted on October 19, 2025, along with Kenny Chesney and Tony Brown. Carlene Carter and John Carter Cash represented their mother at the ceremony.

== Discography ==
=== Albums ===
Year	Album	Chart Positions	
Year	Album	US Bluegrass	US Country
1975	Appalachian Pride	—	—
1999	Press On	—	—
1999	It's All in the Family	—	—
2003	Wildwood Flower	2	33

=== Albums with Johnny Cash ===
Note: this list only lists albums on which June Carter Cash received co-billing. Most 1970s and 1980s album releases by Cash featured at least one duet with her, and/or she provided backing vocals.

Year	Album	Chart Positions	
Year	Album	US Country	US
1967	Carryin' On with Johnny Cash and June Carter	5	—
1973	Johnny Cash and His Woman	32	—
1978	Johnny & June	—	—
2000	Return to the Promised Land	—	—
2006	16 Biggest Hits: Johnny Cash & June Carter Cash	26	126
2006	June Carter and Johnny Cash: Duets	—	—

=== Singles ===
Year	Single	Peak positions		Album
Year	Single	US Country	CAN Country	Album
1949	"Grandma Told Me So"	—	—	—N/a
1950	"Root Hog, or Die"	—	—	—N/a
1950	"Bashful Rascal"	—	—	—N/a
1951	"Thing"	—	—	—N/a
1951	"Mommie's Real Peculiar"	—	—	—N/a
1953	"No Swallerin' Place"	—	—	—N/a
1953	"You Flopped When You Got Me Home"	—	—	—N/a
1954	"Tennessee Mambo, Left Over Mambo"	—	—	—N/a
1955	"He Don't Love Me Anymore"	—	—	—N/a
1956	"Strange, Strange Woman"	—	—	—N/a
1956	"Baby I Tried"	—	—	—N/a
1961	"The Heel"	—	—	—N/a
1962	"Mama Teach Me"	—	—	—N/a
1962	"Overalls and Dungarees"	—	—	—N/a
1963	"I Pitched My Tent (On the Old Camp Ground)"	—	—	—N/a
1964	"Tall Lover Man"	—	—	—N/a
1964	"Go Away, Stranger"	—	—	—N/a
1965	"Everything Ain't Been Said"	—	—	—N/a
1971	"A Good Man"	27	12	—N/a
1973	"Follow Me"	—	—	The Gospel Road
1975	"The Shadow of a Lady"	—	—	Appalachian Pride
2003	"Keep on the Sunny Side"	—	—	Wildwood Flower
"—" denotes releases that did not chart

=== Singles with Johnny Cash ===
Year	Single	Peak positions							Certifications	Album
Year	Single	US Country	US	CAN Country	CAN	CAN AC	AU	UK	Certifications	Album
1964	"It Ain't Me Babe"	4	58	—	—	—	85	28		Orange Blossom Special
1967	"Jackson"	2	—	—	—	—	—	—	BPI: Silver	Carryin' On with Johnny Cash and June Carter
1967	"Long-Legged Guitar Pickin' Man"	6	—	—	—	—	—	—		Carryin' On with Johnny Cash and June Carter
1969	"If I Were a Carpenter"	2	36	1	13	11	52	—		Hello, I'm Johnny Cash
1971	"No Need to Worry"	15	—	7	—	—	—	—		International Superstar
1972	"The Loving Gift"	27	—	22	—	—	—	—		Any Old Wind That Blows
1973	"Allegheny"	69	—	35	—	—	—	—		Johnny Cash and His Woman
1976	"Old Time Feeling"	26	—	24	—	—	—	—		Greatest Hits, Vol. 3
"—" denotes releases that did not chart

=== Featured singles ===
Year	Single	Artist	Peak positions	Album
Year	Single	Artist	US Country	Album
1949	"Baby, It's Cold Outside"	Homer and Jethro	9	Non-album song

=== Music videos ===
Year	Video
2003	"Keep on the Sunny Side"
