= Christopher Evans (outlaw) =

American farmer and teamster turned outlaw

Christopher "Chris" Evans
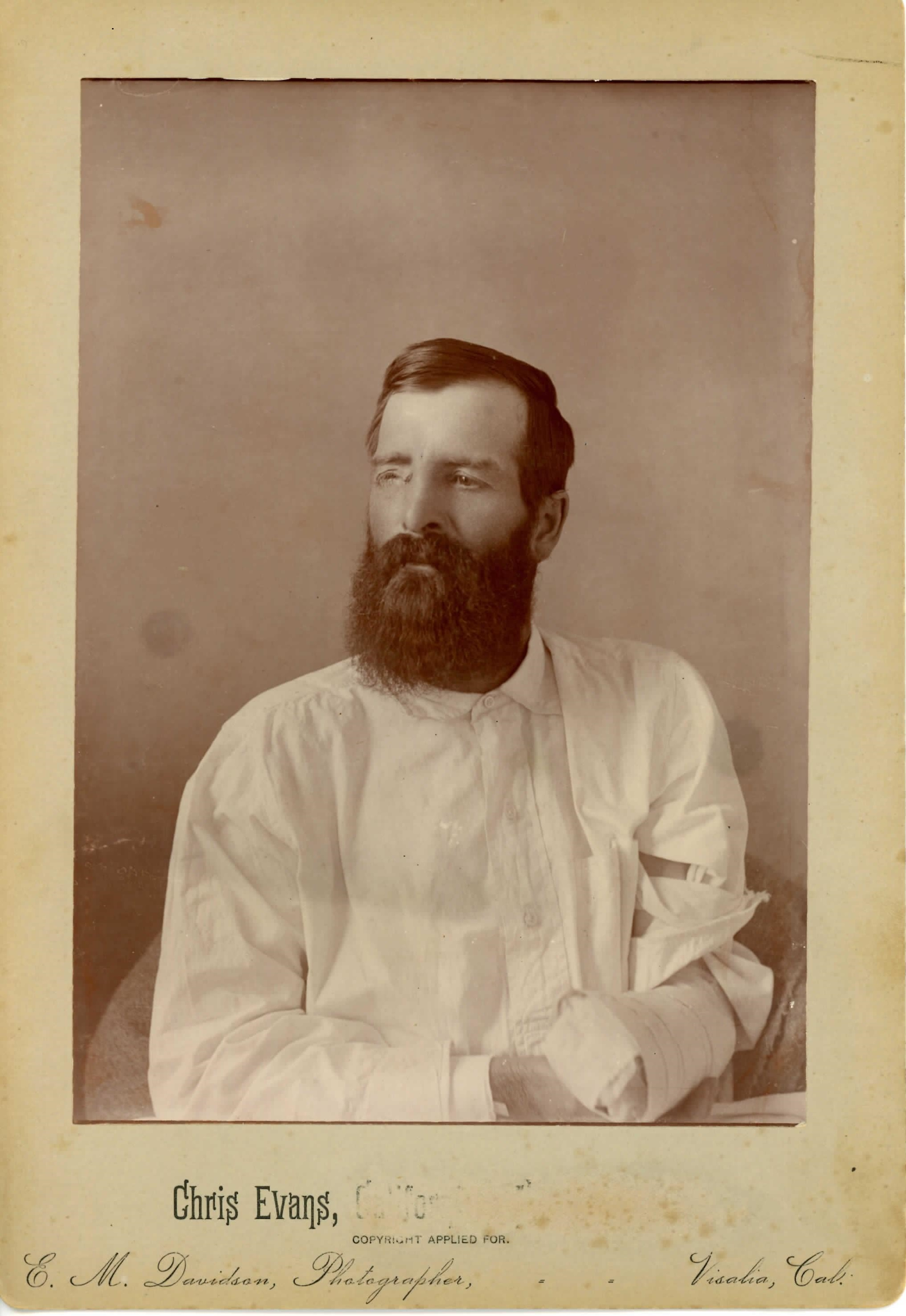
- Chris Evans after the shootout at the Stone Corral.
- Born: February 19, 1847; Bells Corners near Ottawa, Canada West
- Died: February 9, 1917 (aged 69); Portland, Oregon, US
- Resting place: Mount Calvary Cemetery in Portland, Oregon
- Occupations: Farmer and teamster American outlaw, incarcerated at Folsom State Prison; partner of John Sontag
- Spouse: Mary Jane "Molly" Byrd (m. 1874)
- Children: 9

Christopher Evans (February 19, 1847 – February 9, 1917), a native of Bells Corners near Ottawa, Canada West, was an American farmer and teamster turned outlaw, and the leader of the Evans–Sontag Gang.

Alongside John Sontag, Evans was accused of organizing multiple train robberies on the Southern Pacific Railroad in California between 1889 and 1892. After killing a member of a posse outside his home on the outskirts of Visalia, he fled to the Sierra Nevada mountains with Sontag. While Evans and Sontag hid out in the mountains, writers Ambrose Bierce and Joaquin Miller championed their cause in the San Francisco Examiner. The outlaws evaded capture for ten months, all while being hunted by posses of lawmen, railroad detectives, and hundreds of bounty hunters. A shootout with a posse at Young's Cabin resulted in the deaths of Wilson, the posse leader, and McGinnis, a former friend of Evans'. In June 1893, both Sontag and Evans were seriously wounded in what is called the Battle of Stone Corral: Evans ultimately lost an eye and his left arm, and Sontag died of his wounds several days later.

Evans was taken into custody but escaped from the Fresno County Jail while awaiting trial with the help of an accomplice, Ed Morrell. Living as fugitives for several months in the mountains, Evans and Morrell were eventually captured after being lured into Visalia under the false belief that Evans' son was deathly ill. After his surrender, Evans was convicted of murder and sentenced to life in Folsom State Prison in Folsom, California. John Sontag's younger brother, George Contant, testified against Evans and hence acquired the lifelong hatred of Evans' family.

After serving seventeen years at Folsom, Evans was paroled in 1911 by Governor Hiram Johnson, a liberal Republican who had been elected on an anti-Southern Pacific campaign theme. Banished from California, Evans died in Portland, Oregon, in 1917, denying to the end that he had ever robbed a train and continuing to assert that he had killed only in self-defense. He also wrote a socialist book which called for expanded government restrictions to check what he viewed as the abuses of the business community. Evans is interred in Portland at Mount Calvary Cemetery. Evans' accomplice, Ed Morrell, served fourteen years total in Folsom and San Quentin. Championed by author Jack London, Morrell was pardoned in 1908 and thereafter became a well-known advocate for prison reform.

== Beginnings ==
=== Canada to California ===
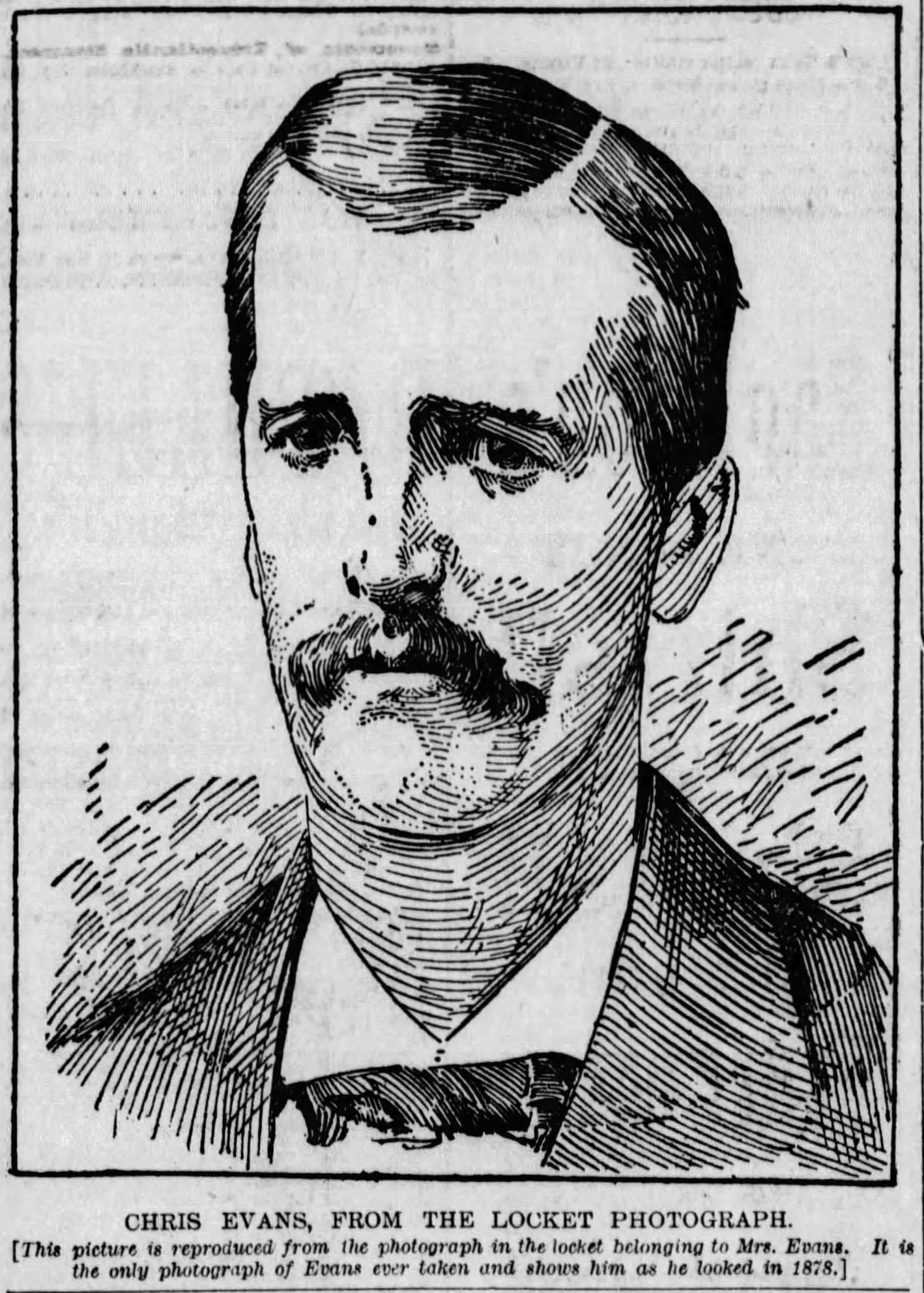
Sketch taken from a locket photograph of Chris Evans taken on his wedding day in 1871

Christopher Evans was born on February 19, 1847, in Bell's Corners, about twelve miles from Ottawa, Canada West. His parents, Thomas and Mary Ann Evans, were both Irish natives who came to Canada separately. They married in Bell's Corners in 1837 and together they had eight children, including Chris.

In the summer of 1863, at age sixteen, Chris left home and crossed the border into the United States. After experiencing Independence Day celebrations that year, Chris felt inspired to enlist in the Union Army at Buffalo, New York, under an assumed name. No official record of this exists, presumably because he joined under a false name. After fighting against the Confederates in the Civil War, Evans was sent to Minnesota and served in George Armstrong Custer's Seventh Cavalry as a scout to fight the Sioux. According to Evans, he became convinced the Sioux had been wronged and lost all interest in fighting. When his term of service expired, he refused to re-enlist and began working for the Union Pacific Railroad. After more than a year he saved up $800 and decided to journey west to California.

In 1870, Chris moved to Visalia, California, where he began working for a lawyer named Daggett who helped Evans educate himself. A few years later, he began working as a teamster, hauling lumber to and from mills in the Sierra Nevada mountains. Soon after, Chris married Mary Jane “Molly” Byrd, who ran an eating house along the road to the mills at a location known as Auckland, twenty-five miles northeast of Visalia. There, Chris and Molly Byrd married at her parents' "Rattlesnake Ranch" on November 4, 1871.

Evans found work watching the Hyde Mill on Redwood Mountain while it was shut down for the winter. Chris' job was to keep snow from collapsing in the roofs of the buildings, and the newlyweds spent that winter snowbound. The couple spent the next few happy months alone together and, before the snow melted, Molly became pregnant with their first child. Evans took an immense liking to the scenery of the mountains and in the spring decided to purchase a 160-acre property one mile below the Hyde Mill at the edge of the Redwood Mountain Grove, the largest grove of giant sequoia trees in the world. He appropriately named it the "Redwood Ranch".

Not long after Molly became pregnant, Chris’ fraternal twin, Tom Evans, travelled to California from Canada with his wife and baby daughter. Soon after, Tom discovered his wife was pregnant again. The two brothers decided they would build up the Redwood Ranch to make room for their growing families and built a cabin together.

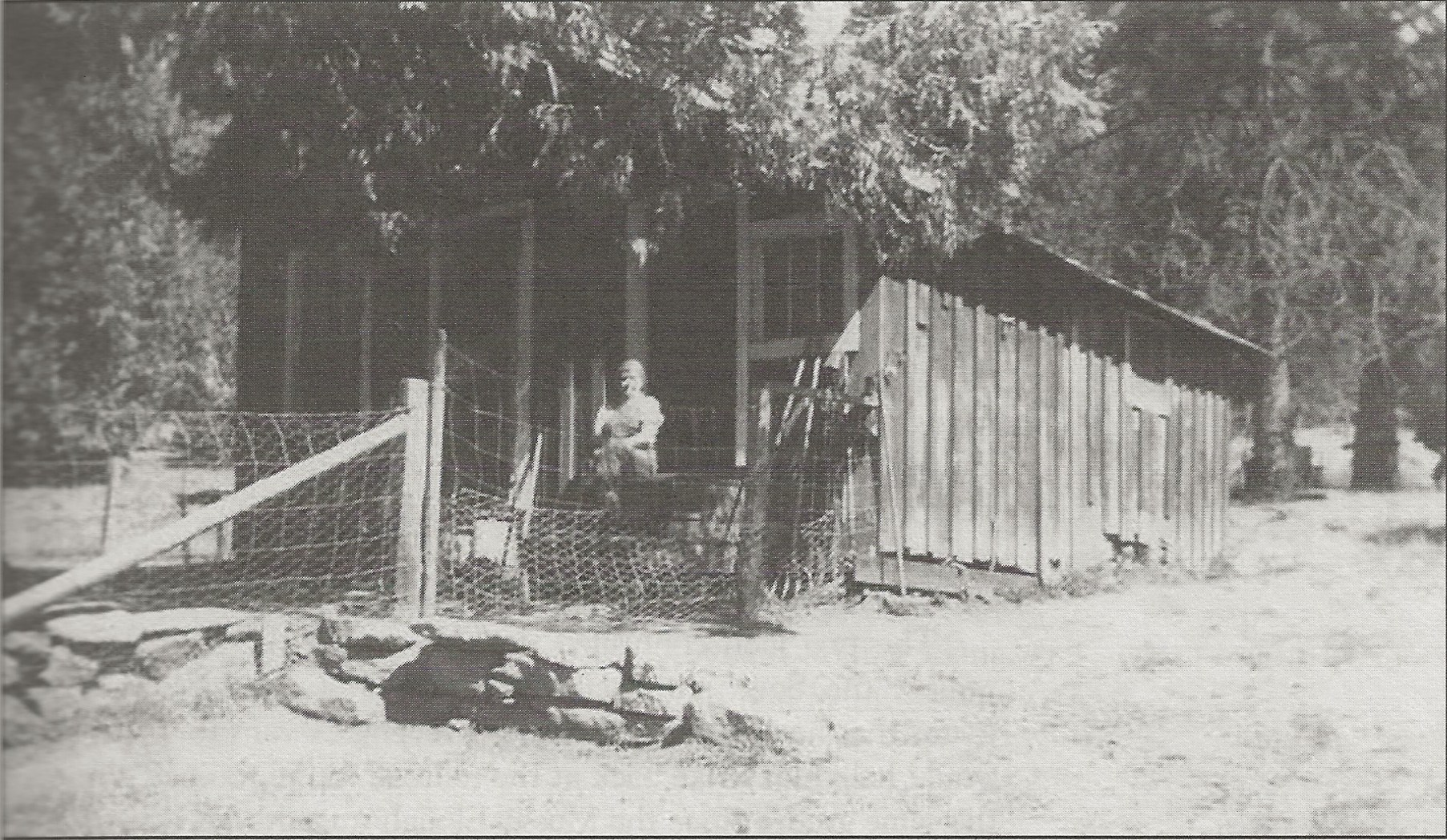
Chris Evans' Redwood Ranch that he built with his brother, Tom, in 1875. Chris' eldest daughter, Eva, is sitting on the front steps.

On July 15, 1875, Molly fell from her horse while she and Chris were riding. She gave birth to a baby boy the following day. The two had planned to name the baby Eugene if he was a boy. He only lived a few hours. Chris built a coffin made of Redwood and buried him under a large cedar tree next to a creek on the Redwood Ranch. Soon afterwards Tom's wife gave birth to a baby girl, but she only lived a few weeks. Chris built another Redwood coffin and buried the baby next to her cousin under the big cedar tree.

The next spring, Chris and Tom heard about good paying work in Inyo County at the Cerro Gordo Mines, the top-producing silver mine in the state at the time. The two brothers decided to make the journey over the Sierra Nevada mountains on foot via Kearsarge Pass, before crossing the Owens Valley to Cerro Gordo in the Inyo Mountains. Molly was pregnant again, so she stayed behind at the Redwood Ranch and at her mother's until she was ready for the journey.

Tom soon became wary of working at Cerro Gordo due to the amount of violence that occurred there. His wife also still grieved heavily over the loss of their child, and she became homesick for her friends and family in Canada, so Tom said goodbye to his brother, took a stagecoach with his wife and daughter to the nearest train station, and left California for Canada. Evans found work as an engineer on the Bessie Brady, hauling seventy tons of freight daily from the north end of Owens Lake to Cartago Landing on the south end.

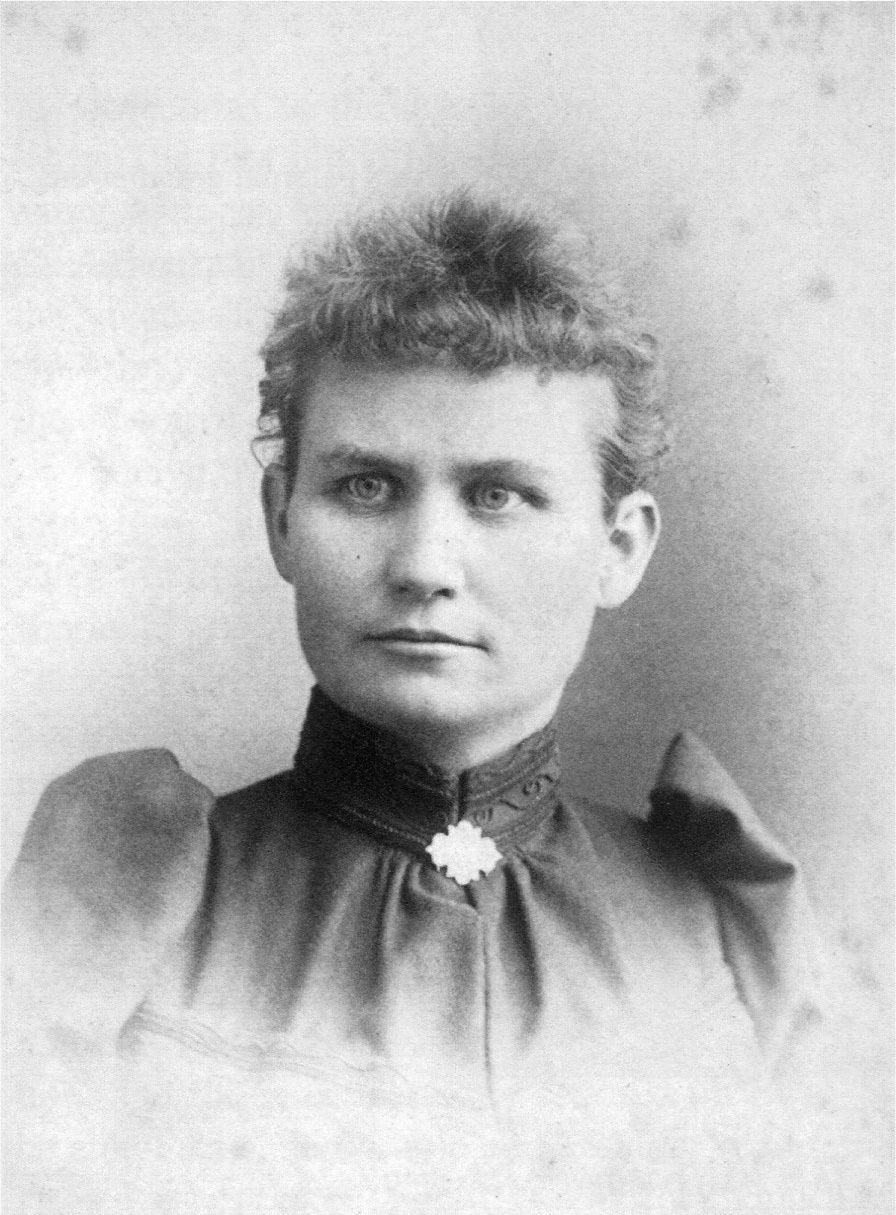
Molly Byrd Evans, taken in 1893 when she was thirty-four years old

On May 13, 1876, while under her mother's care at the Rattlesnake Ranch, Molly gave birth to the couple's second child, which she named Eva. Six months later, Molly and baby Eva took a wagon to the nearest train station and traveled to Inyo County. The county had been the location of intense racial violence between the white, Mexican, and Native American populations. One morning, Molly opened their front door and saw a dead Mexican man hanging from a tree in front of the house. She told Chris that they could no longer live in such a violent region, and that it was no proper place to raise a family. By then she was expecting another child. Cerro Gordo had also declined from its peak, so Chris agreed and took his growing family back to Visalia.

Evans decided to purchase some lots on the northwest end of town for two hundred dollars. In June 1878, not long after the family returned to Visalia, Molly gave birth to a third child they named Elmer. Around the same time, Molly's father, Jesse Byrd, sold his Rattlesnake Ranch property at Auckland and instead bought a ranch in Adelaida located in the Santa Lucia Mountains about thirteen miles west of Paso Robles in San Luis Obispo County. Chris agreed with Molly that it would be best for the family to move to Adelaida with the Byrds. Chris was able to find work at the Klau quicksilver mine on Tablas Creek, about three miles southwest of Adelaida, and for the next few years the Evans and Byrd families lived together harmoniously.

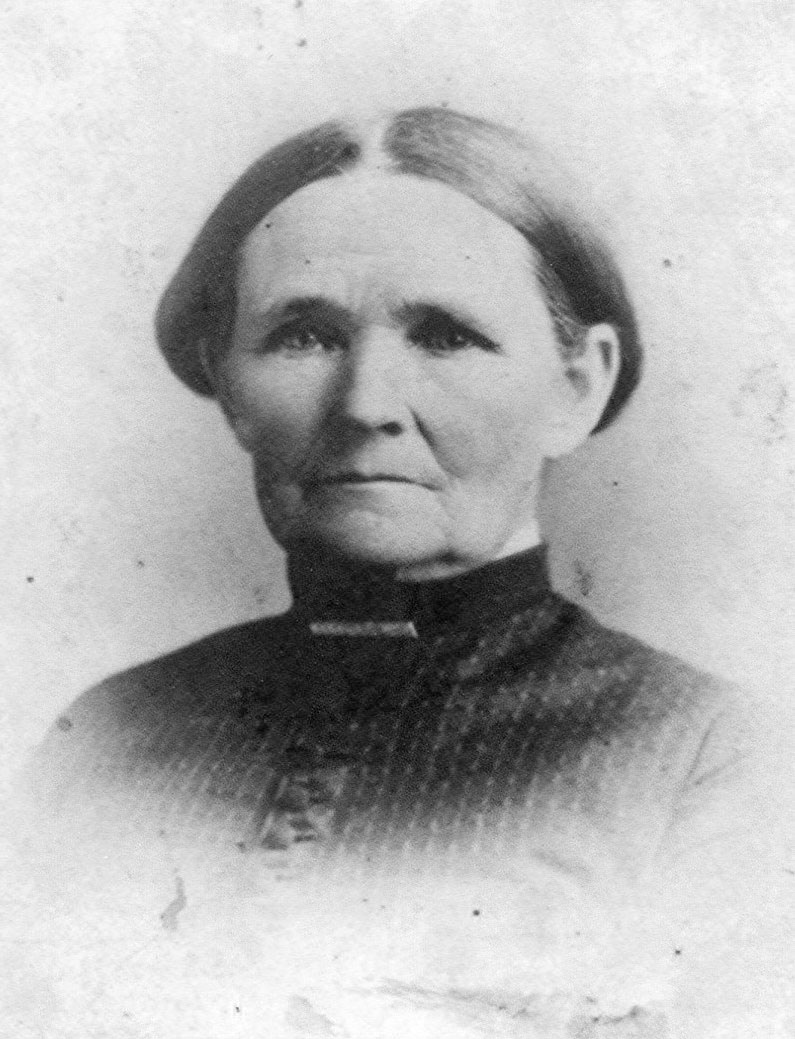
Isabell Saunders Byrd, "Grannie Byrd", in 1890

In the summer of 1880, both of the Evans children contracted diphtheria. The two would both eventually regain their strength and recover, but not long after, Elmer suddenly went into convulsions and died. Spirits improved for the Evans family when, in August, Molly gave birth to a baby girl. The couple named her Ynez, after the nearby Franciscan Mission.

In the fall of 1882, the Evans family decided to return to Visalia. Chris decided to build a home on the lot he had previously purchased on the northern edge of town. It was not long after their arrival that Molly gave birth to a third daughter they named Winifred.

Molly's mother, Isabella Byrd, also bought a lot across the street and a few houses down from the Evans’ and decided to build a home there. She had since separated from Molly's father, Jesse Byrd, who had returned to drinking and went to live with one of their sons on a ranch nearby. Together, Chris and his mother-in-law bought forty acres of fertile farmland one mile south of the city, which they planned to farm at some point in the future.

Chris cycled through several jobs, as many of them were seasonal, but during this time there was no shortage of work available as there was a growing wheat bonanza in the San Joaquin Valley. During the summer, the family would spend their time at the Redwood Ranch, where Evans would work at the lumber mills. The family would return to the valley for the wheat harvesting season, where Chris would find work sewing and bucking sacks off a twenty-two-mule-drawn harvester combine. Through his association with many of the wheat growers in the valley, Chris began to learn about the negative sentiment that existed at the time between the wheat growers and the Southern Pacific Railroad.

=== California's "Octopus" ===
The Southern Pacific Railroad was owned by the "Big Four"; Leland Stanford, Charles Crocker, Collis P. Huntington, and Mark Hopkins Jr. Once small-time Sacramento merchants, the Big Four became the most powerful men in the state through the monopolization of California's transportation system. In 1861, after being brought the idea of building a transcontinental railroad to the eastern states by Theodore Judah, they formed the Central Pacific Railroad in Sacramento. After the breakout of the Civil War, Judah was able to convince Congress to subsidize a railroad track through the Sierra to the east. Judah's surveys showed Congress that a route through the Sierra was possible. He also pointed to the fact that the railroad would be a significant advantage in the war effort by connecting the east and west coasts, which would in turn secure a steady flow of gold and silver from California. President Lincoln signed the Pacific Railroad Act in 1862.

In January 1862, Leland Stanford took office as the eighth governor of California after winning the election that September. Almost immediately, he began using his influence as governor to promote the interests of his own corporation. In 1863 he persuaded the state to begin making their own subsidies for the railroad in addition to the ones already made by the federal government.

A year before the railroad's completion, the four had greatly expanded their assets and made plans to create a monopoly over transportation of the entire state. Stanford, Hopkins, and Crocker formed a bank called the Pacific Union Express Company with Lloyd Tevis, Darius Ogden Mills, and H. D. Bacon. In 1870, this company merged and acquired control of the recently formed Wells Fargo and Company with Stanford, Hopkins, and Crocker all being made directors. Through Stanford's influence in the state government, the four were then able to guarantee their control over the state's main seaport by constructing rail lines around San Francisco Bay and gaining control of the bay's waterfronts.

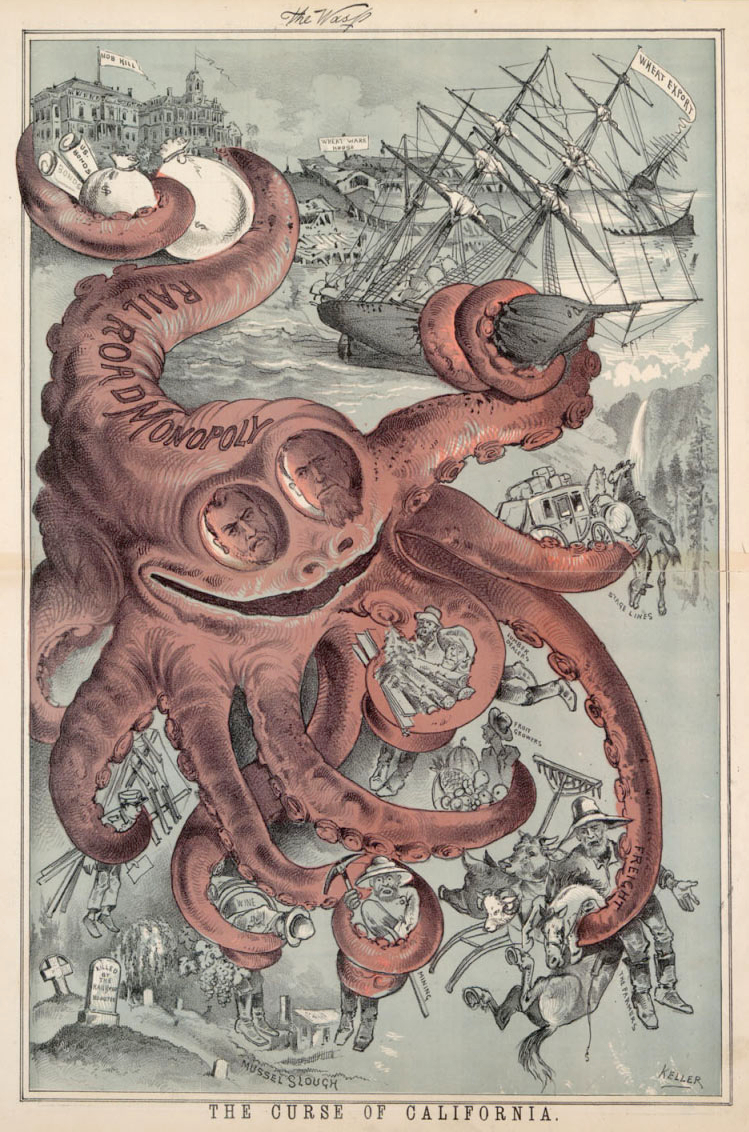
G. Frederick Keller's "The Curse of California", which appeared in The Wasp on August 19, 1882, is the likely origin of the depiction of the Southern Pacific Railroad monopoly as an octopus.

On May 10, 1869, California was finally connected to the rest of the United States by rail. While many thought the completion of the transcontinental railroad would bring wealth and prosperity to California, it did the opposite. The completion of the rail exposed local merchants and manufacturing to competition from the eastern states, which sunk the state into a deep depression that would last for the next decade. The majority of the population blamed the depression on the Central Pacific and the immigration of the Chinese, igniting racial and political tensions in the state. The nationwide Panic of 1873 furthered the depression that had already been occurring in California. In the midst of this widespread economic depression, the Big Four were building themselves huge majestic mansions neighboring each other on Nob Hill in San Francisco, all while gaining immense wealth and power.

The Big Four also focused on controlling the only other competition in transportation and in 1869 bought the California Steam Navigation Company. They also organized their own steamship line, the Occidental and Oriental, in 1874. By 1880, the company dominated ocean commerce in the state. In no other state in the union did a railroad enjoy such freedom of competition where they could set their rates as high as the traffic would bear.

In 1866, U.S. Congress called for a southern transcontinental route to be built and authorized a rail company called the Southern Pacific to build it. The Southern Pacific Railroad had been incorporated a year earlier by a group of San Francisco businessmen who had originally planned on building a coastal route from San Francisco to Los Angeles. The Big Four purchased the Southern Pacific in 1868, guaranteeing them control of the southern half of California as well as freedom from competition with any other transcontinental route.

In 1866, before the purchase, Congress voted to give the Southern Pacific a huge land grant in California to help subsidize a rail line from San Francisco to Los Angeles. This was with the understanding that the line would be completed by 1878. The railroad was to obtain all odd-numbered sections of land for a distance of ten miles on each side of the railroad once completed, which they could then sell to cover the costs.

The Big Four was not satisfied with the coastal route, as much of the land grants would be in the Pacific Ocean, or already acquired by old Spanish Land Grants. After building as far south as Gilroy, the railroad decided instead on an inland San Joaquin Valley route where they could obtain more land. The decision to place the main line through the San Joaquin Valley was responsible for the founding of many railroad towns, such as Merced, Modesto, Fresno, and Tulare.

There were a number of reasons for the bitterness that was held by residents of California towards the railroad, but the residents of the San Joaquin Valley held a particular grudge. First of all, when the company began planning their railway through the valley, they asked Visalia to donate land to the company for its railway yards. When the town refused, a junction was built and named Goshen, leaving Visalia miles from the main railway line and severely stunting its growth. For similar reasons railroad “spite towns” were created such as Lathrop, near Stockton, and Colton, near San Bernardino.

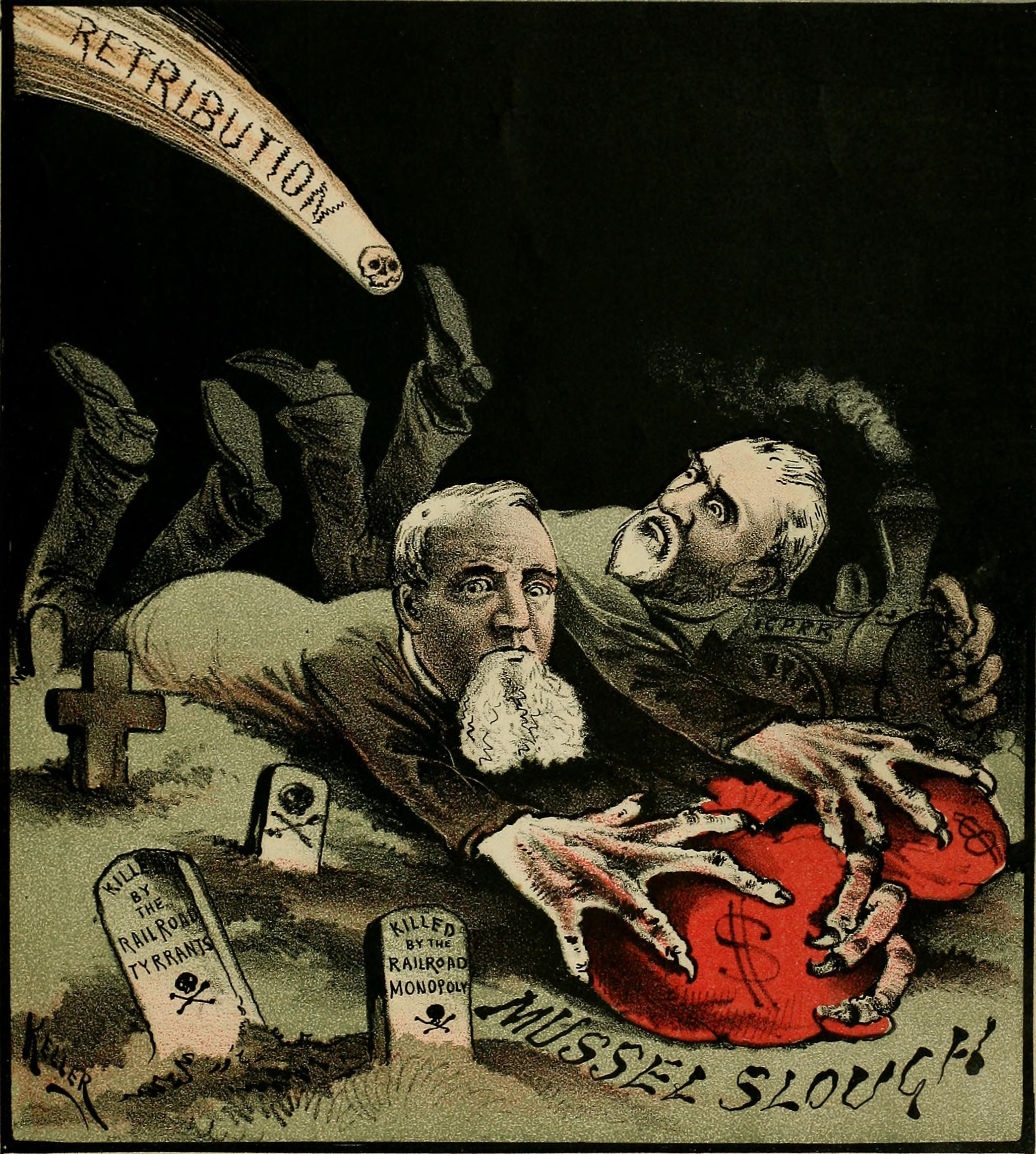
"The Retribution Comet" – Editorial cartoon published in The Wasp, July 8, 1881, depicting a comet with a skull about to strike railroad tycoons Leland Stanford and Collis Potter Huntington, shown robbing the graves of the Mussel Slough victims

It was also a custom of the Southern Pacific to increase freight rates just before the wheat harvest in Tulare County. They would then lower the rates after the farmers had shipped all their grain, so they could show the Railroad Commission their average rates for the year had been low. They also ruled that any freight sent from the east must first be shipped to San Francisco or Los Angeles. This required farmers expecting shipments of machinery to pay for it to first be hauled to San Francisco, even though they would watch it pass right through Tulare County. They would then have to pay for it to be shipped back to them. This delay caused some farmers to lose their wheat crops by being forced to let their grain stand beyond maturity in the summer heat. The Big Four were also from the northeastern US, whereas many of the wheat growers in Tulare County were of Southern descent. Tensions from the Civil War were still high during this time and added to the growing hostility.

During the time Chris Evans had been living in San Luis Obispo County, an event occurred in Tulare County that would change California history. On May 11, 1880, a dispute over land titles between settlers, located 5.6 miles northwest of Hanford, California, and the Southern Pacific Railroad ended in bloodshed when seven people were killed in a shootout. This became known as the Mussel Slough Tragedy. The stories of the injustices committed against the San Joaquin Valley residents resonated with Evans. Even though he was not a settler near Hanford, he would eventually face his own injustices from the railroad.

Tired of working seasonal wage jobs that kept him away from his family for weeks at a time, Chris decided to farm the land he had previously bought with his mother-in-law on the forty acres south of town. In 1885, Chris planted the entire tract of land with beans, the new emerging cash crop in the valley as new irrigation techniques became available. Being cautious, he decided to pay a visit to the depot agent in Tulare to check shipping rates to market before deciding to plant. Due to the high short-haul rate, shipping from Visalia to Goshen was too expensive and it was more economical for Chris to haul the beans by wagon to the main Southern Pacific line at Tulare. He then signed a contract with a firm in Oakland and agreed to sell his entire crop, knowing he would make a good profit. When Chris brought his crop to Tulare after harvest that season, the agent informed him that the rates had risen significantly since he had last checked. Since his contract with the Oakland firm was ironclad, Evans was forced to sell his beans at a loss and ended up selling his south Visalia property.

After this failed venture, Chris continued to cycle through many jobs to try and provide for his growing family. That same year, 1885, Molly gave birth to a baby boy the couple named Joe. Two years later she gave birth to another boy they named Louis Napoleon.

=== Evans meets Sontag ===
In 1887, Chris began working for the Grangers’ Bank of California as a superintendent for their grain houses located at the shipping points in the towns of Pixley, Alila, and Tulare. The bank loaned farmers money for seed and machinery, and Chris’ job was to check in any wheat that was being shipped by farmers who owed the bank money. This ensured that any of the farmer's profits would first be paid back to the bank. As the farmers resentfully paid back the bank, they expressed their resentment for the railroad to Chris, complaining about the high rates the railroad was charging for shipping their wheat.

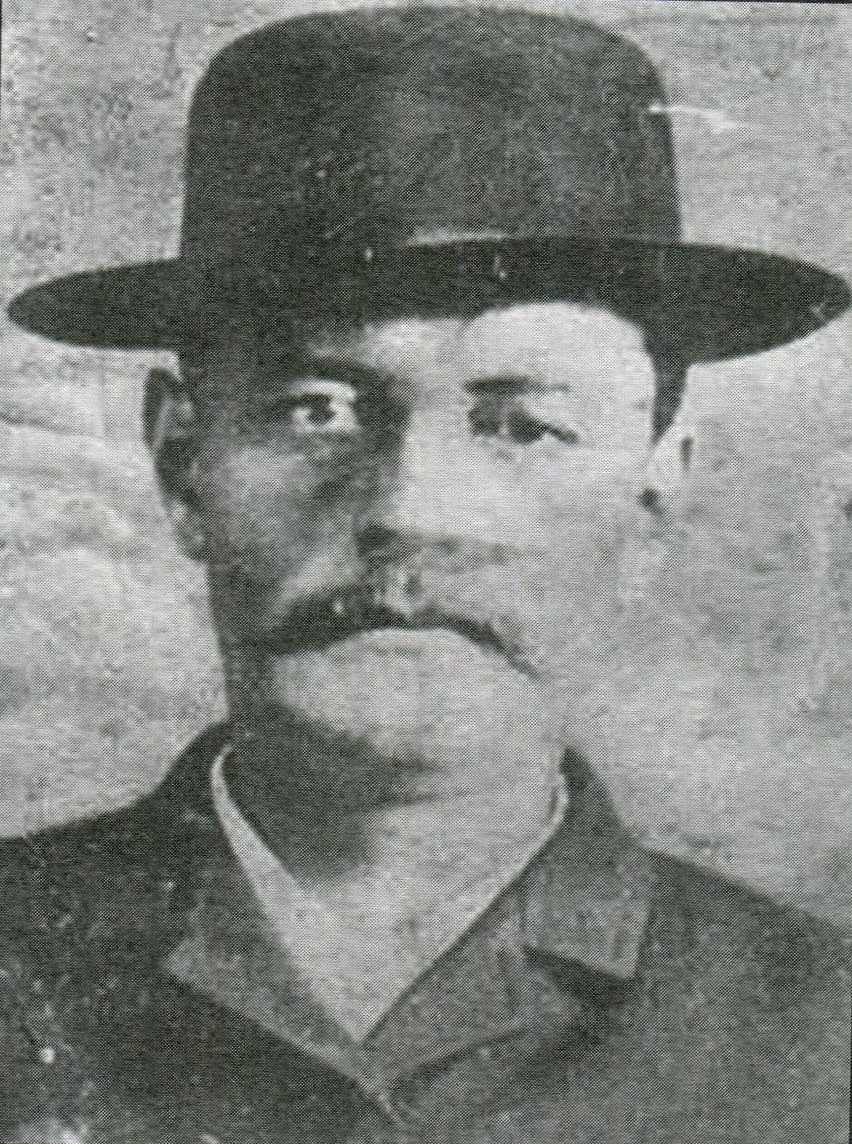
John Sontag

One day in Tulare, Chris met John Sontag. Chris was asked by one of his friends to tell the story of Mussel Slough to Sontag, who had previously been a railroad employee but was apparently unaware of the tragedy. John was only in the valley for a few months when he found work in Tulare as a brakeman for the Southern Pacific. One day when his train was switching in the railyard in Fresno, the engineer confused John's signal for “Go” with the one for “Back”. When Sontag moved in between the two cars to uncouple them, the cars bumped together instead of coming apart. The two flat-cars he was trying to uncouple were loaded with iron rails and the projecting end of one rail pierced his right lung from the back. His injury would eventually heal, but he was left with a fist-sized hole in his back.

According to Sontag, he spent two weeks in the railway hotel in Sacramento before being kicked out while still unwell. When he went to the railway office in San Francisco to look for light work, the railroad only offered him his old job as a brakeman and told him that he could take it or leave it. Unable to perform his previous job due to his condition, John was left homeless and out of work at twenty-five years old. Some of his friends had paid for his room at the railway hotel in Tulare, but they could only do so for so long. When the group in front of the hotel finally began to depart for home, Sontag was left with nowhere to go. Evans offered Sontag to come home with him, explaining that he needed someone to perform some light work around his house as he was gone most of the time. Sontag agreed.

Evans' horses also responded well to Sontag, and Evans could tell that he cared deeply for them. John and Chris both shared a love for horses and both were superb riders. Sontag exceeded Evans' expectations working on their property over the several months that followed. By that summer, he was hauling lumber for Evans from Redwood Mountain to the valley. A year later, in 1889, Molly gave birth to another son, who they named John Christopher.

== Train robberies ==
=== Pixley ===
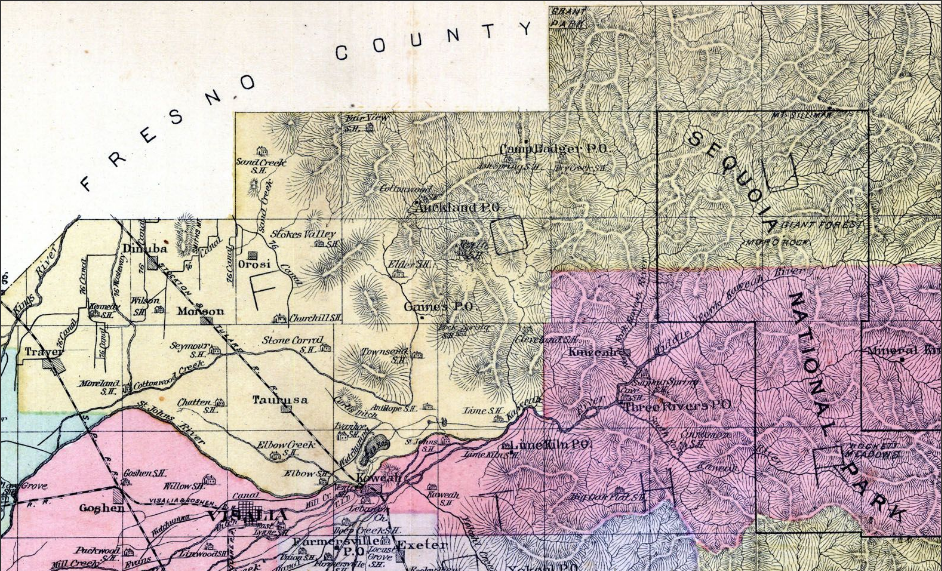
Northeast Tulare County, part of a map of Tulare County in 1892 by Thos. H. Thompson

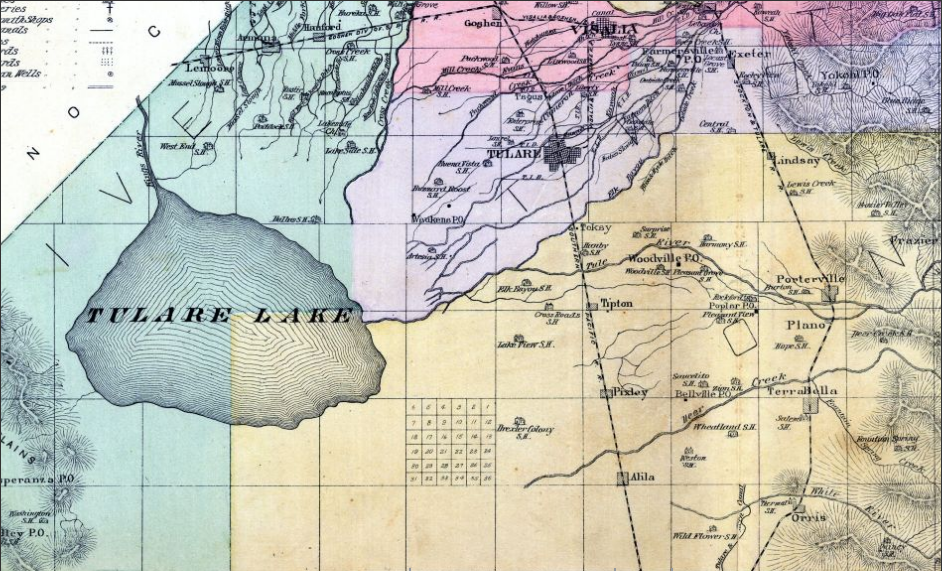
South Tulare County, part of a map of Tulare County in 1892 by Thos. H. Thompson

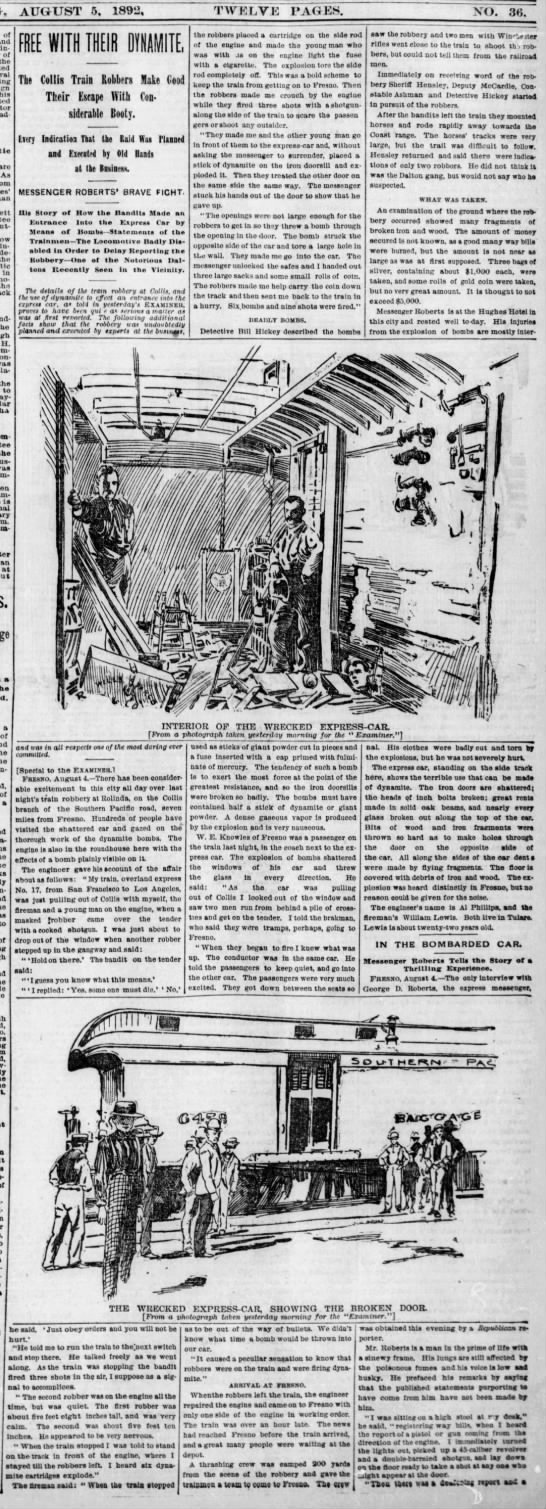
San Francisco Examiner, Collis Robbery, August 5, 1892

From 1889 to 1898, seven train robberies were attempted in the San Joaquin Valley. On February 22, 1889, the southbound train No. 17 arrived in Pixley at 7 o’clock in the evening. At the appropriate time, the No. 17 train departed Pixley, with two men hidden in the tender. A few moments later, the two men both snuck into the engineer cab and pointed their revolvers at the engineer and fireman. Checking the time, the robbers then forced the engineer to stop the train about two miles south of Pixley, at Deer Creek. Meanwhile, a Merced Deputy Constable named Ed Bentley and the conductor got out of their car and began walking towards the engine to see why the train had stopped. One of the masked men then ordered the engineer and fireman in front of him and, using them as cover, marched them back to the express car. The other robber then arrived at the other side of the express car, but noticed it had been bolted. He shouted at the messenger inside and ordered him to open the door. When the messenger refused, the robber placed a dynamite bomb under the door and lit it. After signaling his companion to stand back, the bomb exploded, blowing the glass out of the windows. The door however remained intact and it did not break or derail the car.

After hearing the explosion, the conductor and the Deputy Constable ran down the west side of the train toward the express coach. The deputy, hearing steps on the other side of the coach, grabbed a lantern from the conductor and peaked under the car. One of the robbers had decided to peek at the same moment and quickly fired a load of buckshot. The constable, severely wounded in the hands and face, retreated to the rear of the train. The conductor ran the entire two miles back to Pixley to alert the railroad authorities. Also walking down the side of the coaches was a brakeman named Anscon, who was carrying a bright lantern visible to the waiting outlaws. He was followed by a railroad employee named Henry Gabert. Right before the outlaws fired their shotguns at them, Anscon threw himself to the ground and Gabert was hit in the chest, killing him.

The robbers then ordered the engineer and fireman to have the express messenger open the door, or else they would shoot them. The messenger did as he was told in order to save the men. While one robber kept track of the hostages, the other pointed his gun and directed the messenger to open the express box. After throwing the gold and paper currency into saddle bags, the robbers rode away into the thick Tule fog with horses that had been placed beforehand.

Newspapers throughout the state reported the robbery, with multiple-column headlines in the Tulare papers. Some reports put the amount stolen at around $5,000, although the actual amount was only $400. Deputy Constable Ed Bentley succumbed to his wounds eight days after the robbery. A reward of $2,000 was offered by the Southern Pacific Railroad and Wells Fargo for each outlaw captured.

=== Goshen ===
It would be almost a year later before another train robbery was committed. On the morning of January 22, 1890, the southbound No. 19 train from San Francisco departed from Goshen station at 4:00AM. The robbery was performed almost exactly the same way as the Pixley robbery. About two miles out from Goshen, two masked men hidden in the tender jumped into the locomotive cab and aimed their shotguns at the engineer and fireman and ordered them to stop the train.

The engineer and fireman were then used as human shields and were marched to the express car with revolvers pointed at their backs. The express messenger was then ordered to open the door. The robbers looted the express car, finding $2,000 in rare two dollar bills, a box of gold watches belonging to Wells Fargo & Company, and $20,000 in gold. While the robbers exited the express car, a stowaway named Jonas Christiansen crawled out from between the cars where he had been hiding. One of the robbers noticed the stowaway and, thinking he was an armed man coming to interrupt the robbery, quickly dropped down, wielded his shotgun in between the engineer's legs, and fired his gun from under the car. Christiansen was shot dead.

The two escaped towards the Sierra Nevada mountains, with horses that were hidden nearby, just as the robbers had done at Pixley. Even with the combined effort of Tulare County officers, Wells Fargo, and Southern Pacific detectives, the identity and whereabouts of the train robbers remained unknown.

A few months after the Goshen robbery, Chris went to Modesto and decided to lease a livery stable from a man named Thomas Wallace. Chris sold all his cattle and all his horses, except twelve. He then leased his ranch south of town to Sol Sweet, the owner of a mercantile business in Visalia. Chris rented a house right across the street from the stable, and in September 1890 moved his family to Modesto.

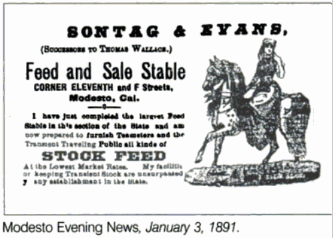

Evans himself was relatively poor, and some wondered how he was able to afford to lease this livery stable. This included Molly's brother, Oliver Perry Byrd, who worked for Tulare County Sheriff Eugene W. Kay as a deputy. Although there was no evidence to charge Evans and Sontag for the train robberies, Perry Byrd related his suspicions to Kay. Thinking he may have found his train robbers, the sheriff asked Byrd to keep him informed on the pair's activities.

Chris Evans seemed to prefer the company of his horses more than the average person, and there were three in particular he was especially attached too. One day in December, he rented out one of these horses, a black stallion named Paddy O'Neil, to a man who needed a horse and buggy for an overnight trip. The man returned the same evening however, and Paddy showed severe signs of exhaustion. Chris could tell the man had driven the horse too hard. He tried to save the horses life, and even called his daughter Eva to help him, but Paddy died around midnight. Chris laid on the horse's shoulder and cried. The next morning, Chris found the man and beat him so bad that he was hospitalized.

On January 7, 1891, at about two in the morning, Evans awoke to fire in his stable. Inside were twenty-two of his horses, as well as a sixteen-year-old orphan who Evans had let sleep in the loft of the barn. Evans’ fiercely urged the firemen to rescue the boy, who set their ladders against the wall and made a hole in a small window. After smashing through the wall, they were finally able to get the body out. They laid the boy on the sidewalk on the partially burned mattress, proving that he had died from asphyxiation. As Evans turned away his head, Molly appeared at the scene and began to go into hysterics at the site of the burnt dead boy. She was pregnant at the time, and many worried she would lose the baby, but baby Carl was born without issue later that May.

Almost all of his equipment was gone and twenty-two of his horses were dead. Two horses that Sontag had taken that day and two horses hired by another man were all that were saved. Wallace was covered by insurance, but Evans' lease was not, and they both decided that the building process was too much. Later, while rebuilding the stable, another fire broke out and several sacks soaked in coal oil were found in and around the stables. John felt that it was either the man Chris had beaten getting revenge, or someone was trying to rid of the competition. Either way, Evans and Sontag were ruined.

=== Alila ===
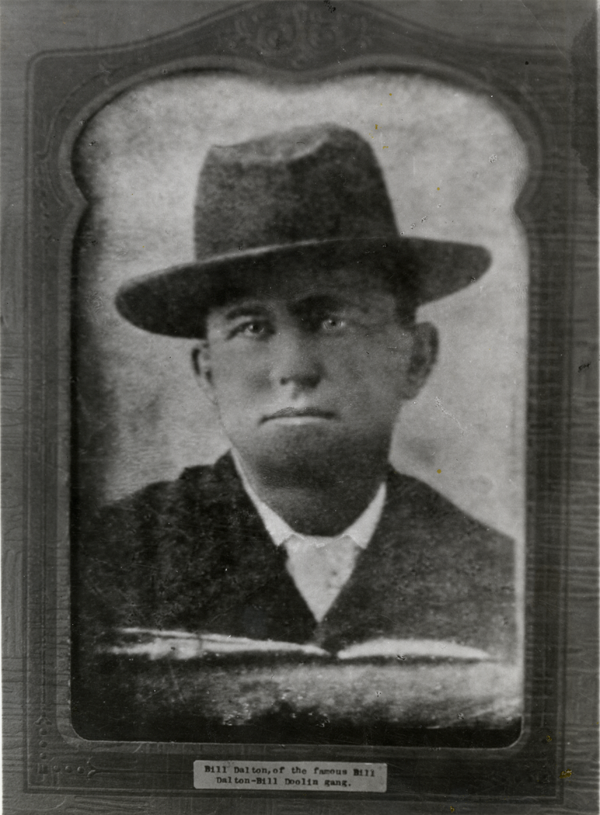
Bill Dalton

On the night of February 6, 1891, a Southern Pacific Railroad passenger train was held up by two masked men who carried only 44-calibre revolvers, near the town of Alila (present day Earlimart, California). This robbery was performed very differently from the previous two. The robbery proved unsuccessful, but amidst the cross fire of the firefight that ensued, the expressman, George Radliff, had been shot and later succumbed to his wounds.

When Sheriff Kay arrived on the scene, he discovered evidence of a camp made nearby the site of the robbery, as well as horse tracks that led west towards the Coast Range. What went unreported is that Kay had suspected Chris Evans and John Sontag, but upon receiving further evidence, he decided that the robbery could have been the work of anyone and didn't know what to think.

Sheriff Kay followed the horse tracks to the home of Bill Dalton on the Estrella River, in between Paso Robles and San Miguel, California. He then suspected Bill Dalton and his brothers in the Paso Robles area of the Alila robbery. That March 1891, newspapers reported that the Tulare grand jury had indicted brothers Bill, Grat, Bob, and Emmett for the Alila robbery. Bill and Grat were both arrested and a $3,000 bounty was placed for the capture of Bob and Emmett. Bill soon obtained bondsman and was released, but Grat was held in the Visalia jail to await his trial.

Sheriff Kay tracked Bob and Emmett across the southwest to Oklahoma for three months on a 6,000 mile manhunt, but was forced to return to Visalia for Grat's trial. What wasn't well known at the time was that Chris Evans and Grat Dalton were well acquainted. The two had worked for a time together at the Pixley grain warehouse. It was also later reported the Chris attended every day of Grat's trial in Visalia during that June and July.

=== Ceres ===
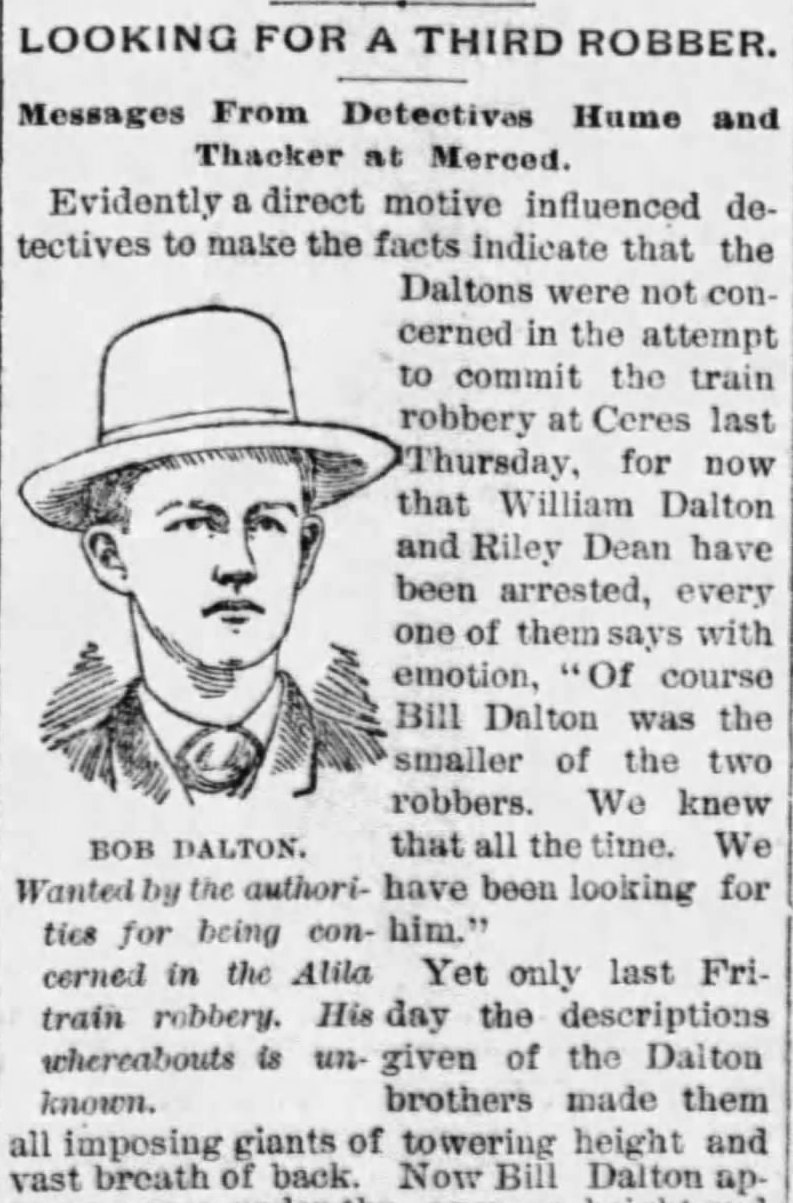
San Francisco Examiner, September 8, 1891

After the fire in Modesto, John Sontag went to visit his mother and brother in his hometown of Mankato, Minnesota. About ten days after his return to California, a robbery occurred near Ceres on September 4, 1891. The robbers had placed an obstruction on the track and climbed aboard after the train came to a halt. Other than this, the robbery was performed in a very similar way to the robberies at Pixley, Goshen, and Alila, all of which occurred in the San Joaquin Valley in the previous two years. Kay suspected Evans and Sontag but, upon further investigation at their home in Modesto, became convinced they were not involved. Kay didn't have any suspects for the Ceres robbery, but Southern Pacific detective Will Smith insisted that it was the work of the Dalton's and demanded their arrest. Smith was an experienced officer, but some considered him unpredictable, and his personality made him unpopular among his peers. Still, Kay resentfully told Smith that he would serve the warrants if the men were still in the area.

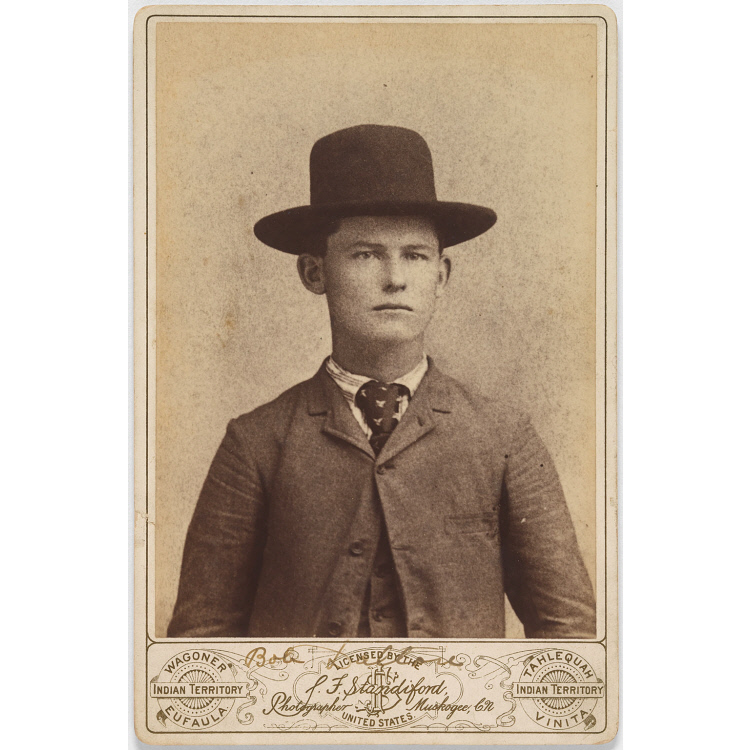
Photo of Robert "Bob" Dalton circa 1889

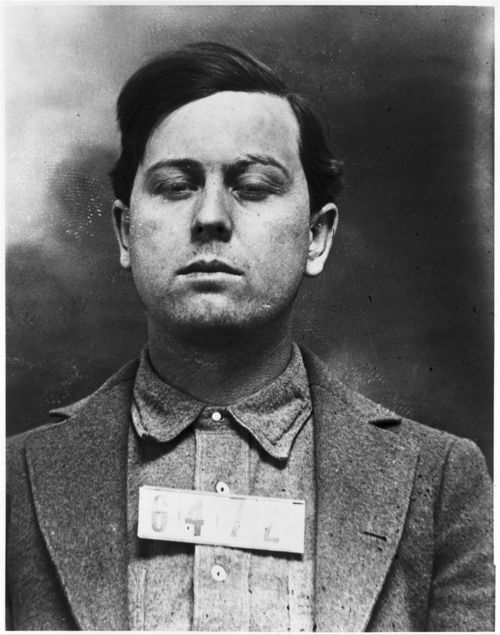
Emmett Dalton

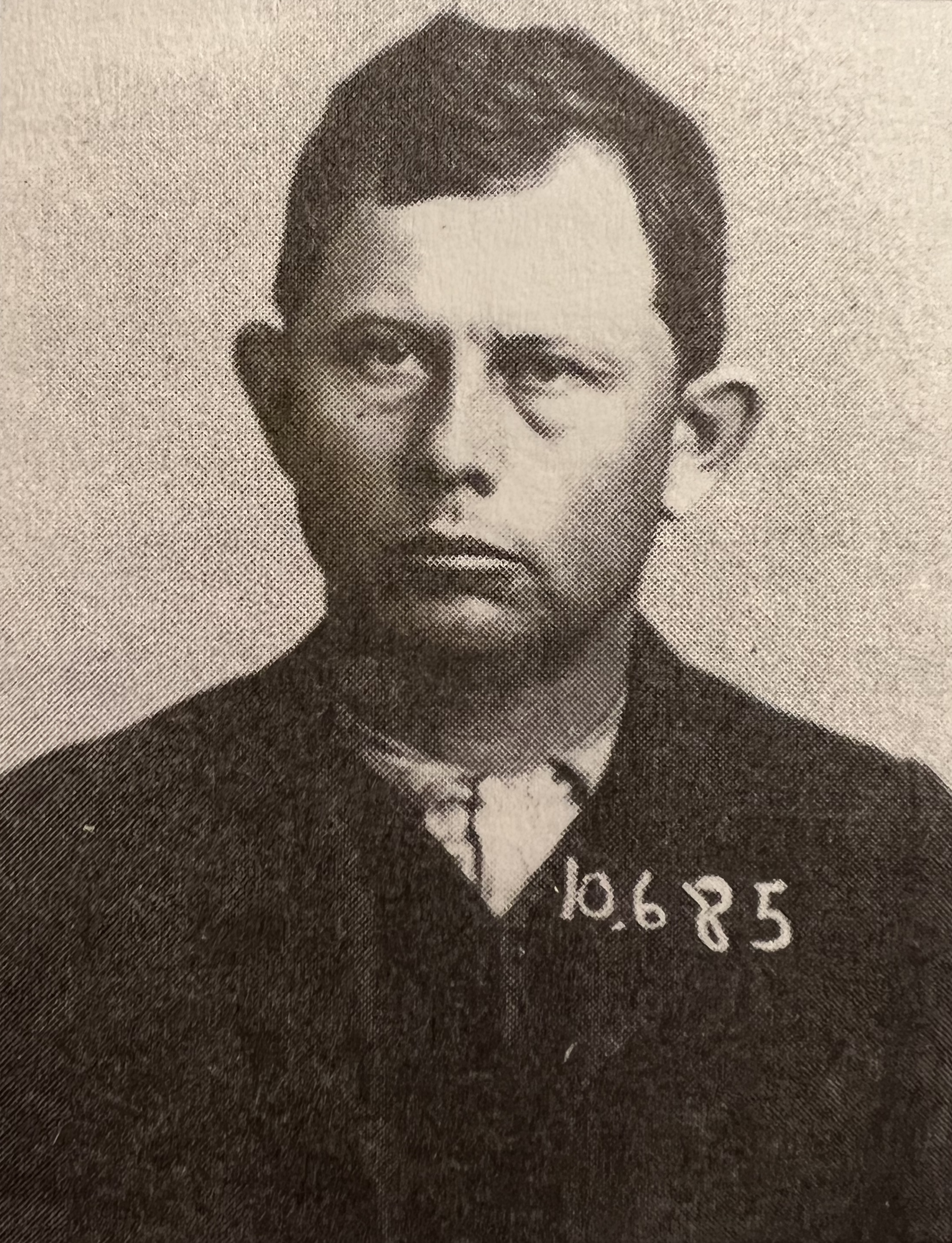
Grat Dalton in the Tulare County Jail, after his arrest in March 1891.

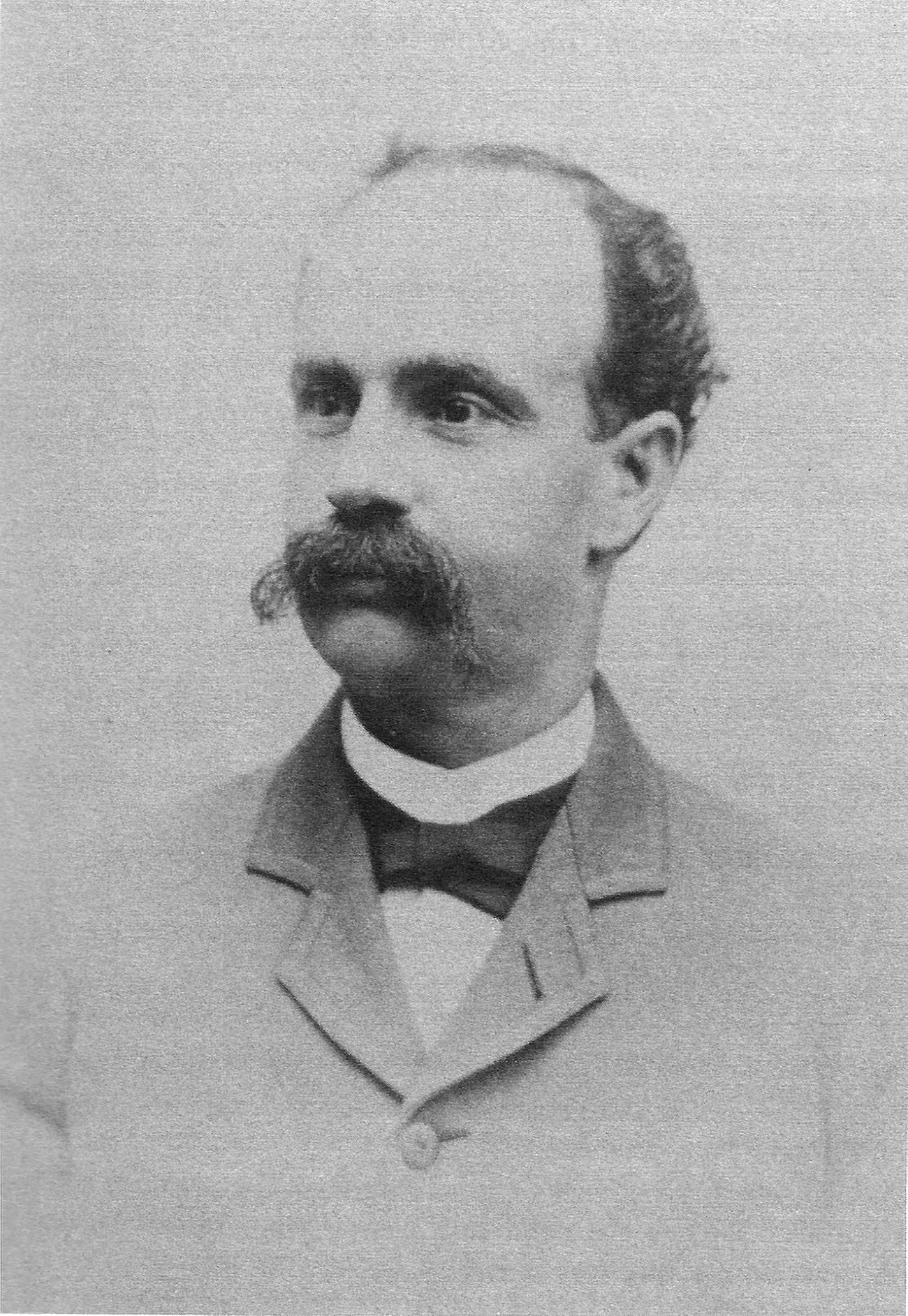
Tulare County Sheriff Gene Kay, taken in 1891 when he was sworn into office

A few day later, Kay arrested Bill Dalton and Riley Dean at an abandoned Overland Stage station at Cross Creek where they looked as if they were either planning to rob a train, or break Grat from jail. After questioning however, the two established a clear alibi. Riley Dean was released, but Bill was held in the Visalia jail after his bondsmen withdrew.

By that time, Chris' daughter Eva had fallen in love with John and it had been decided that the two should be married. Although Sheriff Kay claimed that Chris and John were in Modesto right after the Ceres robbery attempt, the two appeared in the Tulare County Recorder's office the day after the robbery to record a number of property transactions. Among the transactions recorded was one that was claimed to have occurred in January 1890, when Chris sold his Visalia lots to John for $1,100 in gold coin. John then recorded that he sold the same lots to Eva Evans for $5 in gold coin on April 18, 1891. On the same day Chris also deeded and titled his Redwood Ranch to his wife Molly. Chris had already sold his farm south of Visalia shortly after the Modesto fire. So, a day after the Ceres robbery, Chris and John no longer owned any property under their names.

On September 27, 1891, Grat Dalton and two other men escaped from the Visalia jail. Grat had been assisted from someone on the outside. Pieces of a hacksaw blade, smuggled from the outside, were discovered in the cell toilet. Grat and the two other prisoners sawed their way through the bars and later rumors claimed he found a winchester rifle and ammunition hidden for him in the weeds. The other two prisoners were eventually captured months later, and they gave away Grat's position near the summit of a steep mountain, fifteen miles northeast of Sanger. The posse of Tulare County Sheriff Kay and Fresno County Sheriff Hensley ambushed Grat on his way back from a boar hunt and discovered he was accompanied by Riley Dean. The posse was able to arrest Dean, but Grat escaped. He was able to eventually make his way to his brothers in Oklahoma, where they would form what would be known as the Dalton Gang. Bill was found in his cell after Grat's escape, but eventually was found innocent by a Visalia jury. Upon his release he too made his way to Oklahoma to join his brothers.

The Evans family moved back to their home on the northern edge of Visalia that fall, but John returned to Mankato to visit his younger brother. George Sontag had not seen his older brother since John had left for California, thirteen years earlier. John had run away from home at age eighteen, avoiding his mother's wishes for him to become a Catholic priest.

Shortly after John left, George stole a box of cigars from a cigar shop he worked at and was sent to the Minnesota State Reform School in St. Paul in 1879 at fifteen-years-old. George escaped reform school in May 1880 and moved to Winnipeg, Manitoba, where he worked for the Canadian Pacific Railway. He then moved to Omaha, Nebraska, in 1884 where he worked at a grocery store. After being caught embezzling funds he was sentenced to two years in the Nebraska State Prison. After a year in State Prison, he escaped with a fellow inmate while returning from hauling hay in the fields. He managed to make his way home safely to his mother in Mankato. Afterwards he went to Grand Rapids and found work as a brakeman. He then became a yardmaster for the C & WM Railroad, when his mother called him home.

Back in Mankato, his mother showed him a letter from the warden of the prison, telling him if he returned to carry out his sentence he would not be punished. He returned to the prison in May 1886. Following his release in January, he immediately returned to Mankato and married his childhood sweetheart. They had their first child in 1888.

The following year a warrant was issued for George's arrest on the charge of counterfeiting. His co-conspirator was arrested and afterwards discharged, but George had left with his family to Chicago to avoid arrest. George found work for the Chicago Railroad and his wife gave birth to a daughter there in 1890. He quickly grew tired of the roaming railroad life, and returned to Mankato where he would start a home painting and decoration business. There, his infant daughter would die in the spring of 1891. Shortly afterwards, John would return home to Minnesota.

Jacob Contant was George and John's father's name. Their father died in 1866 when he fell from a schoolhouse he was assisting in building, the same schoolhouse John and George would later attend. Their mother remarried a man named Mathias Sontag, the owner of the Sontag Hotel and a prominent citizen of Mankato. The young brothers were then adopted by their step-father and they took the name Sontag. When George got older and learned his real father's name, he changed his name back to Contant, whereas John decided to keep the name Sontag.

As the season turned cold, John yearned for the warmth of the California sun and decided it was time to return to his fiancé in Visalia. The winters in Minnesota only allowed George to work part-time and he was short on cash. John asked George what he thought about coming with him to California, to meet the Evans family and find work. George thought it over after John had left, and eventually decided to temporarily leave his pregnant wife, child, and painting business. He and John arrived in Visalia that December.

After spending several months with John and the Evans family that winter and spring, George took a trip to San Francisco to see a specialist that would help him with his poor eyesight. He then got a letter from his wife that she had given birth to a son, and he returned to Minnesota.

Later in the summer of 1892, John sent another letter to George telling him that Evans had made some mining claims in the mountains with his close friend Clark Moore, and that George should come work with them. George arrived that July and stayed with Chris at his mine in Sampson Flat, near the Kings River. On August 1, 1892, they both decided to make their way back to Visalia.

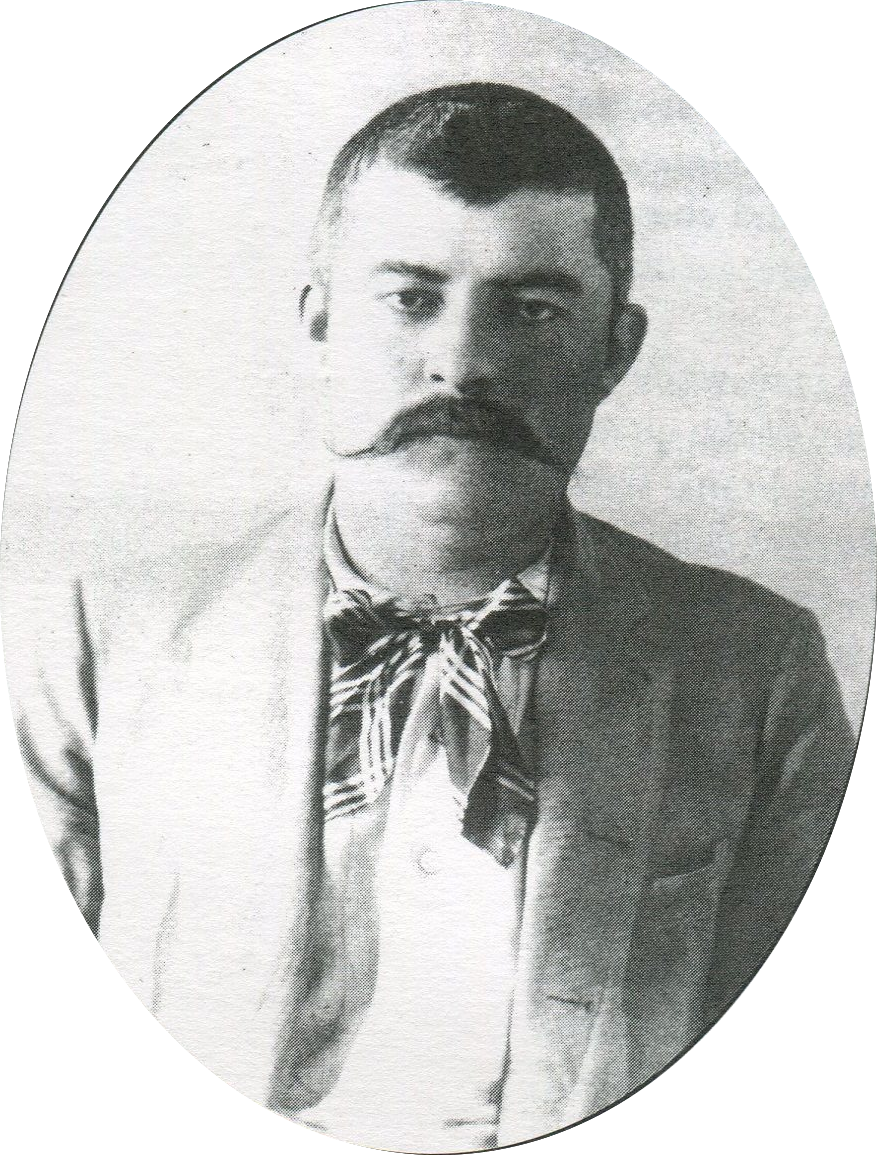
George Contant aka Sontag

=== Collis ===
On August 2, John hired a team of horses from the stables in Visalia to pick up Chris and George in the mountains. Chris had already made his way to Selma however, where he spent the night at a friend's ranch before leaving the next morning to discuss his mining claim with his lawyer in Fresno. When George arrived in Visalia, he told John where Chris had gone and John drove the team to Fresno to meet him. The team remained in the stables in Fresno that night and all day August 3. John was then seen that evening taking the team west.

On the night of August 3, 1892, a fifth train was robbed near a railroad stop named Collis (later named Kerman) by two masked men as it was making its way to Fresno. Again shotguns and dynamite were used, with the robbers crawling down from the tender and marching the fireman and engineer to the express coach. This time the robbers offered the railroad men cigars and lit them. When the robbers began placing dynamite bombs on the car door, they asked the fireman to light them. The fireman asked, "How shall I do that? I know nothing about bombs?" to which the leader of the bandits replied, "What do you think I gave you that cigar for?"

The first bomb blew the shoes off the express messenger's feet, but otherwise failed to do damage to the car. The next bomb blew the messenger into the wall and dislocated his shoulder. When the messenger refused to give the robbers the keys, he was pistol whipped and the keys taken. The three railroad men were then forced to carry the loot to the robbers buggy 200 yards away.

In this robbery $15,000 was taken, $1,020 of which was in 1,700 Peruvian coins. It could not have been the Daltons, as they were known to be robbing trains at the time in the Midwest. Fresno County Sheriff Hensley arrived at the scene and believed the robbers had headed west.

Wells Fargo and Southern Pacific railroad detectives arrived in Fresno and went over the details of the robbery. They learned that two residents of Visalia, who had been under surveillance by Sheriff Kay's deputies, had not been home the night of the robbery. They also discovered that one of them had rented a team in Visalia that had been seen in Fresno just before the robbery. Wells Fargo and the Southern Pacific were also notified that George C. Contant, alias Sontag, had been tracked to Visalia by the Pinkerton Detective agency under suspicion that he was involved with a train robbery near Kasota, Minnesota, that June, along with an associate named Charles Naughton. They also believed he was involved with a train robbery that occurred near Racine, Wisconsin, in November 1891.

== Evans and Sontag ==
=== Trouble in Visalia ===
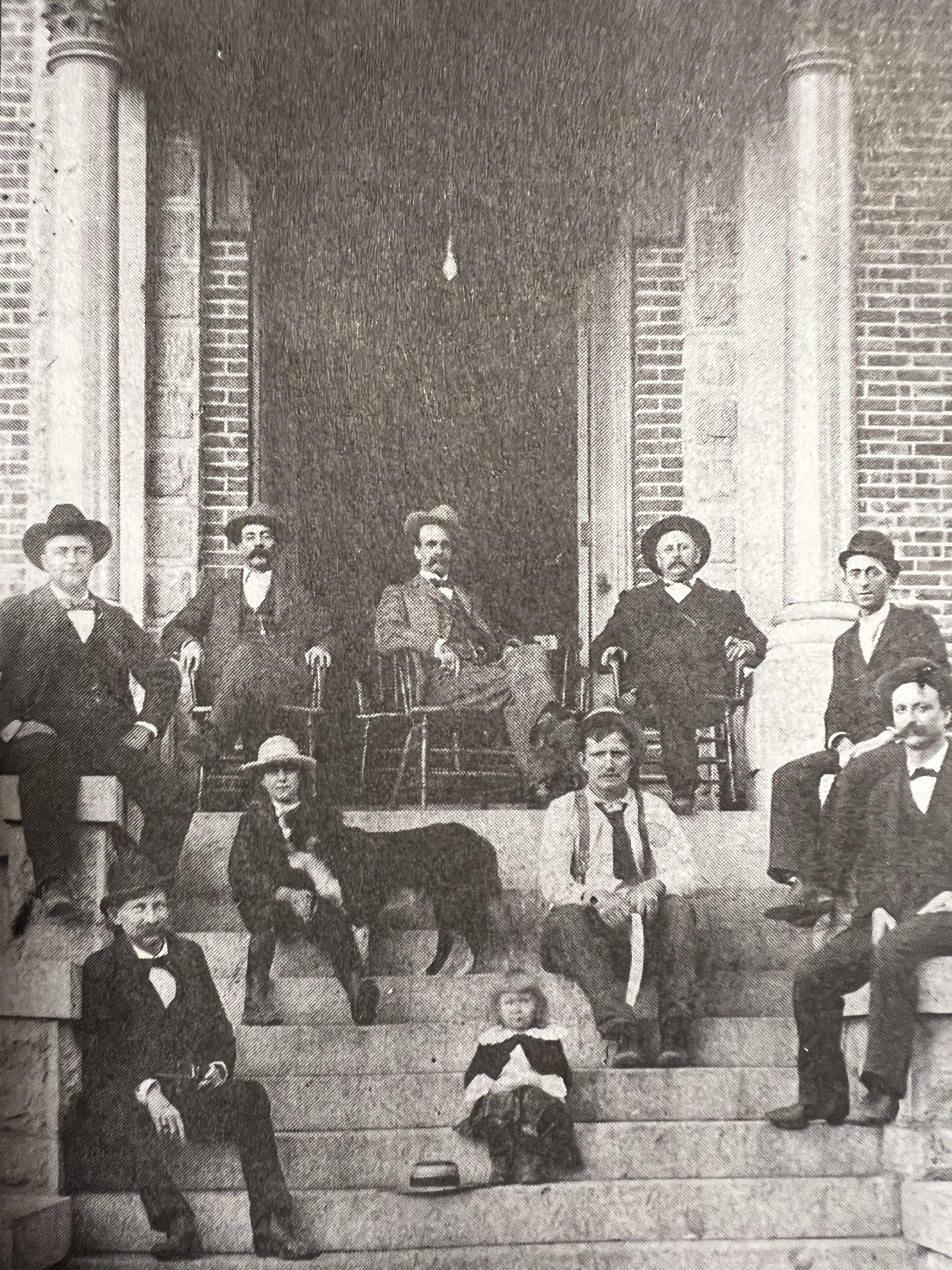
Seated in the chairs in the doorway (left to right) Tulare County Deputy Sheriff George Witty, Sheriff Eugene Kay, and Undersheriff William Hall. Others in the photo are unknown. Photo taken around 1892.

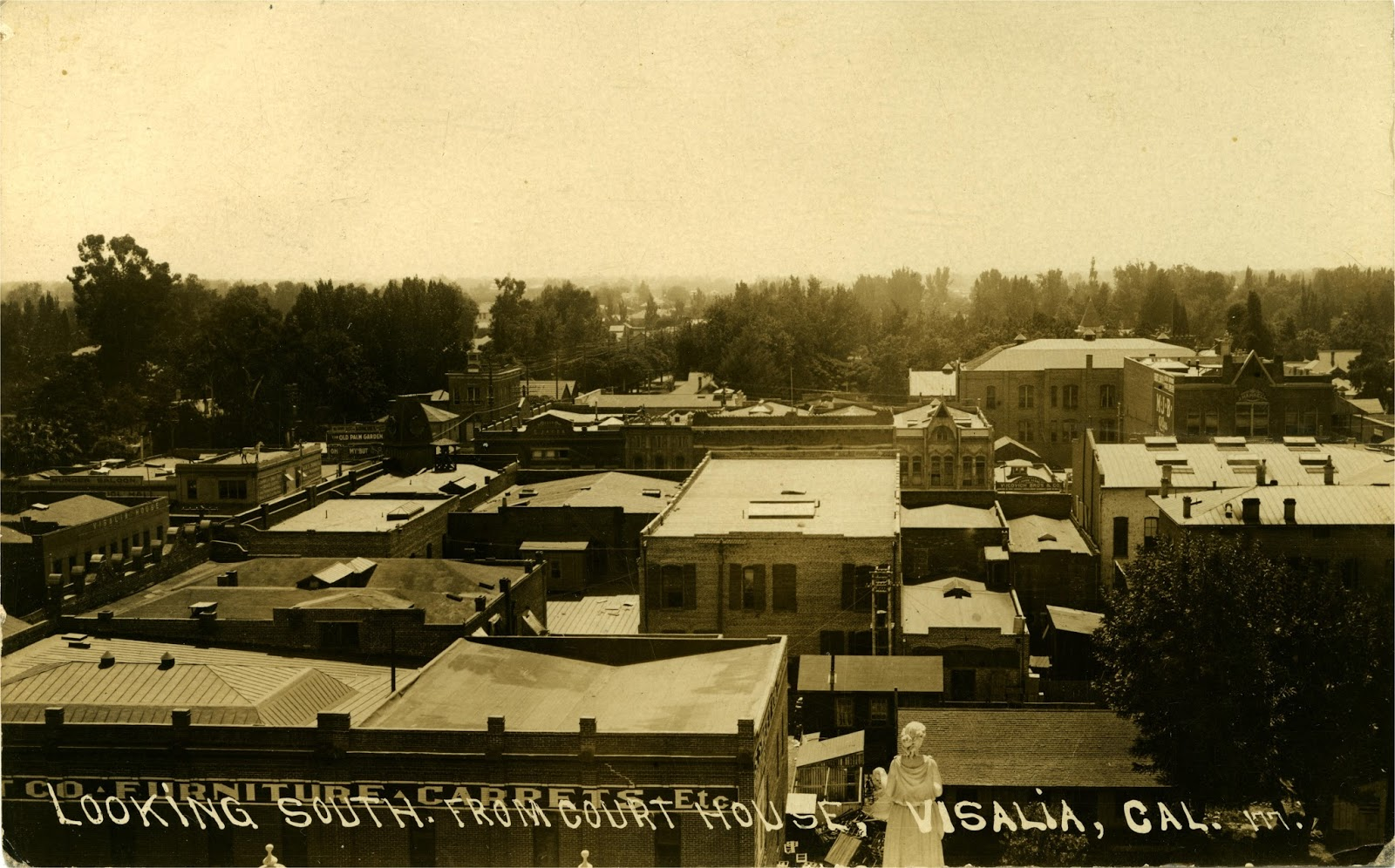
A view of Victorian era Visalia from the Tulare County Courthouse looking south, Sol Sweet Company seen at bottom left

On August 4, 1892, Chris Evans and John Sontag returned together to Visalia. George had also returned separately earlier that morning, after deciding to make his own trip to Fresno the previous night to meet a girlfriend. Upon his arrival in Visalia that morning, George rented a room at the Palace Hotel. The following day, August 5, the Evans family began preparing for their annual trip to the Redwood Ranch. This trip was usually made at the end of spring, to escape the valley heat during the summer, but Chris and John had been so busy that the trip had been delayed.

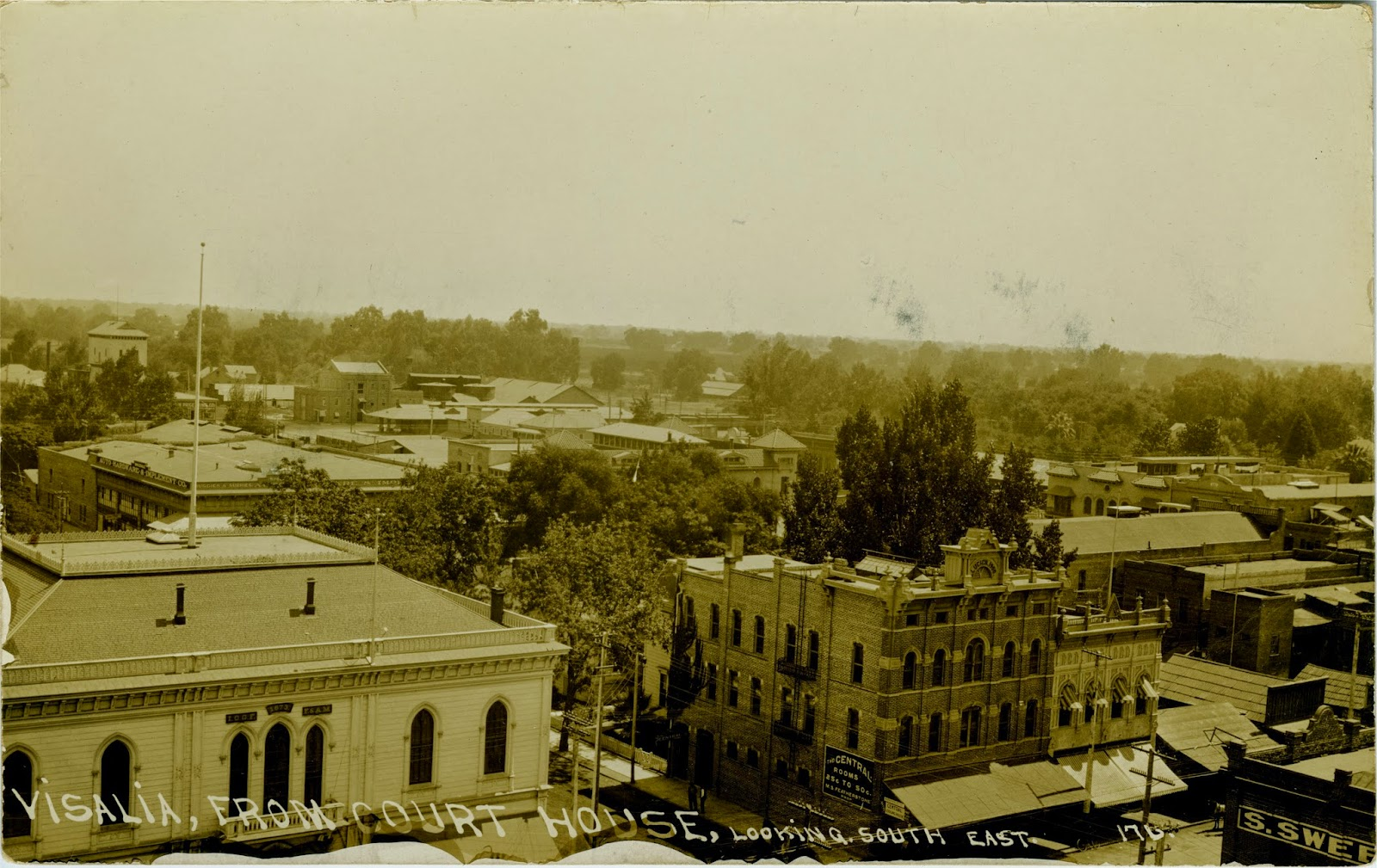
A view of Victorian era Visalia from the Tulare County Courthouse looking southeast, Sol Sweet Company seen at bottom right

The Sontag brothers met up at the Evans’ home and decided to head downtown. After deciding to pay a visit to a local saloon, George quickly became drunk. John, who rarely drank, became annoyed and decided to go back to the Evans’ home. George then made his way through Visalia's fifteen different saloons. He began telling people that he had been a passenger on the train during the Collis robbery and that he knew all the details. One of the bartenders who had overheard George related this information to S.P. detective Will Smith. The detective then asked Deputy George Witty to pick up George for questioning. Witty found George in front of the Evans’ home and asked him to come to the sheriff's office to tell what he knew about the Collis holdup. John, who was inside the house, did nothing to dissuade George and the latter agreed to go with Witty for questioning.

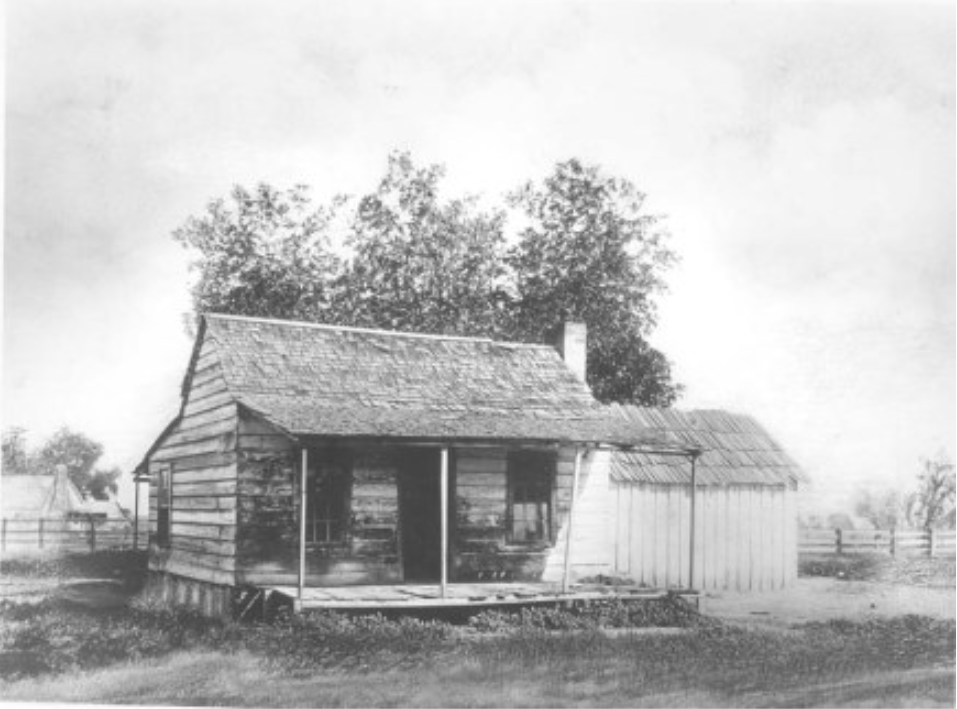
Chris Evans home in Visalia on Strawberry Ave and 2nd Ave

Sheriff Kay was out of town at the time, so George was instead interviewed by Undersheriff William Hall and several detectives. George was drunk, so his statements were confusing and contradictory, but he agreed to have been present on the train during the robbery, although he said nothing to implicate Chris, John, or himself. The officers quickly established that George had not been a passenger on the train at Collis. The amount of information George knew of the robbery led Smith to suspect that he had been involved and placed him under arrest. Smith and Witty then headed back to the Evans’ home where they planned to bring in John, as well as George's luggage.

The Evans family in the meantime had been busy picking figs in the back of their property and failed to notice John or George at the house. As Smith and Witty approached on a cart, they noticed John enter the house through the front door. John then proceeded into one of the back rooms. When Eva Evans went inside through the back to drop off some figs, she noticed the two officers standing at the front door. They asked Eva where John was and she replied that she did not know. Smith then allegedly called her a liar and she ran to the back to get her father. Chris came in, grabbed a revolver from the back bedroom, and went to address the officers. He told them that John had gone downtown, but Smith became angry and said that Sontag had just entered the house.

Smith and Witty then pulled their revolvers to cover Chris, while they searched the house for John. Smith began to enter the house, but as he did John stepped out from behind a portière that separated the back bedroom from the rest of the house, carrying a double barrel shotgun. Smith quickly fired, but his bullet missed and almost struck Eva's head. The two lawmen then quickly ran out the front door.

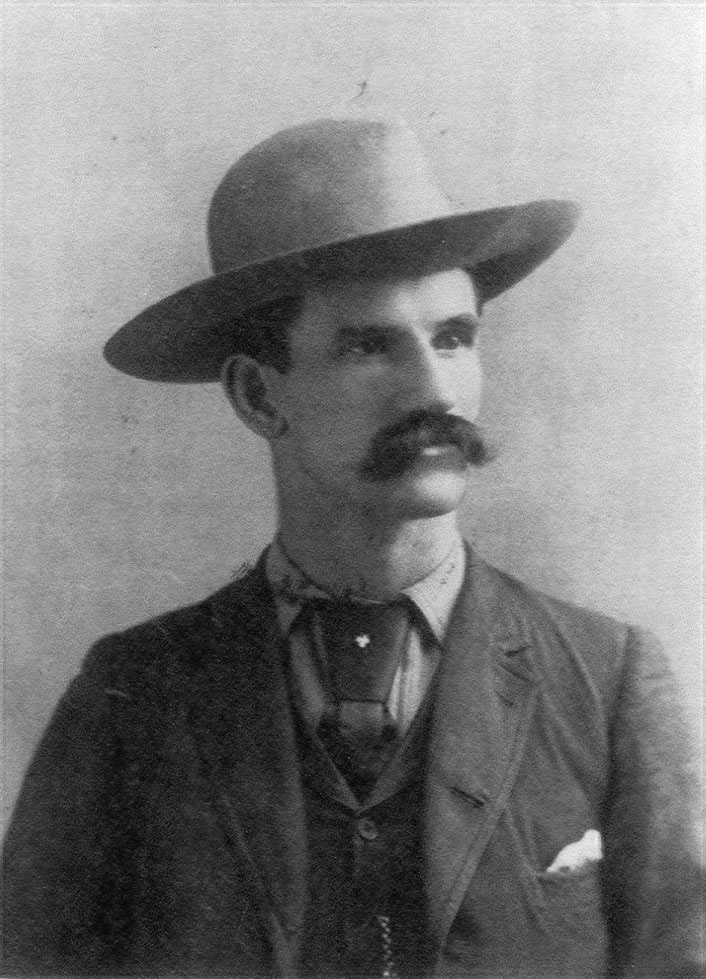
Southern Pacific Detective Will Smith

As the lawmen raced across the front yard through the fence, Evans fired at Witty from the porch with his revolver. Smith turned and fired at Evans but was then shot in the hand and the shoulder by Sontag's birdshot. Smith ran for his life and Evans fired at Witty striking him in the shoulder. Witty fell and yelled to nearby neighbors that Evans was trying to kill him. When Evans stood over Witty, he begged Evans not to shoot him again as he was already dead. Evans and Sontag then stole Sheriff Kay's cart and fled down Strawberry street towards the mountains.

Molly Evans and her children had heard the shots while picking nectarines at the back of the property, but did not see what happened. A crowd assembled around the scene and officers took Witty and Smith to the hospital, both would eventually recover. Smith was later reproached for not waiting for backup before deciding to make an arrest. Within thirty minutes a hundred men were assembled to search for Evans and Sontag. Some of the officers told Molly that the Sontag brothers and her husband were train robbers and she soon became hysterical. After the crowd and officers had dispersed, Eva found deputy Witty's revolver laying on the ground with only a single shot fired.

According to Chris, after stealing the sheriff's team, Sontag and him rode down the county road to the home of Molly's brother, Henry Byrd. They received a meal from Henry's wife, and after watering the sheriff's team, they told the Byrd's that they were headed to the mountains to hunt Grat Dalton.

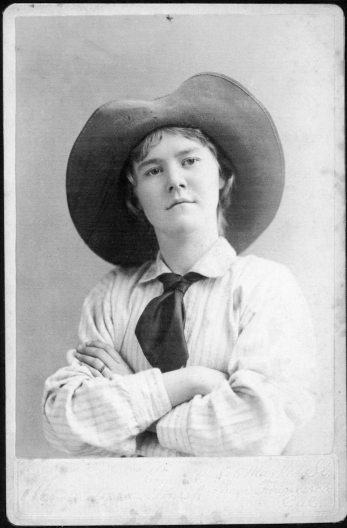
Eva Evans in 1893

That night, Molly and Eva were sitting together in one of the bedrooms when they heard someone from the front porch whisper “Molly”. It was Chris, and John and him both crept through the front door. They told Molly and Eva that they were innocent of any train robbery and had been framed. Chris argued that, if John would have surrendered to the officers, it would have been a death sentence. The Southern Pacific owned the courts and he argued that they were ready to convict any man who resembled the description of the robbers, one tall man and the other short. It was well known how John felt towards the railroad, and Chris was sure that John would not have lived long in prison with only one lung and heart problems. Chris then related their plan to rescue George that night as he was being transferred to the Fresno jail. The two left while Molly and Eva waited on the porch for their return.

Later that night, Chris and John returned, walking in the middle of the road with shotguns on their backs, not even concerned about the officers that were out searching for them. George had not been brought to the rail station, so they were not able to rescue him. After the two ate dinner, they began gathering supplies into Sheriff Kay's stolen wagon hidden in the barn. As they opened the barn door, a man who had been hiding in an irrigation ditch in front of the house, Deputy Oscar Beaver, opened fire on them with his rifle. Other officers who had been hiding across the road also opened fire. The horses from the stolen team were hit and one was killed. Molly and Eva ducked to the floor while Chris and John returned fire. Oscar Beaver was hit with a shot of buckshot, and fell dead. Evans and Sontag escaped on foot through the trees into the darkness. A posse of officers attempted to pursue them, but lost them in the thick woods, and gave up about four miles from town.

John had broken his ankle while working that summer and was limping, since he had not fully recovered. Evans was also suffering from a foot injury that had occurred at his mine at Sampsons Flat. They fled into the swamps and thick oak woodlands of the Kaweah River that surrounded Visalia, and attempted to find some horses. They walked all night, reached the edge of the woods by dawn, then made their way across the hog wallow land between the woods and the foothills of the Sierra. As the sun rose, they noticed a cloud of dust rising from the horizon behind them, and knew that they were being trailed by a posse. They were able to make their way to a lone ranch (near present-day Yettem) unnoticed, where they asked the family inside to remove themselves to the barn. The posse approached the house and Chris noticed that one of his friends, Tulare County Supervisor Sam Ellis, was a member. Ellis dismounted his horse and made his way to the front door. When he opened it, he saw Chris sitting in front of the door with a shotgun resting on his lap, aimed directly at him. Ellis turned to the posse, told them nobody was home, and then rode off. Evans and Sontag thanked the family and asked to purchase one of their mules.

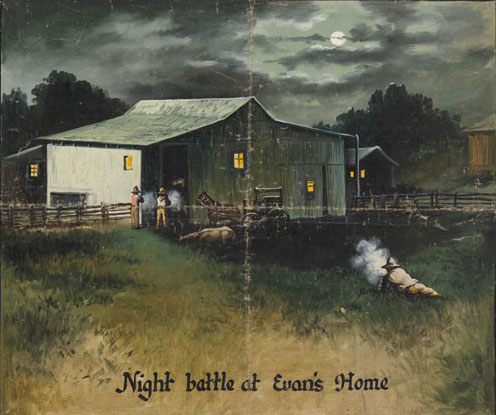
Painting of the second gunfight in Visalia on August 4, 1892

After making a good distance into the mountains, they abandoned the mule and made their way to a large cave that Evans and Sontag had known of previously on Dry Creek, in an area known as Dark Canyon, not far from Evans Redwood Ranch and only a mile upstream from his friends, the Downings. The cave, which Evans and Sontag would name Fort Defiance, was a natural fortress. It had a narrow entry, was perfectly hidden, and had a spring on the inside. John buried his ankle in some wet sand, and the pair hid in the cave for four days without food until it recovered.

Sheriff Gene Kay returned to Visalia on August 6, after tracking a horse thief in Santa Cruz, and began forming a posse to hunt Evans and Sontag. Many in the posse had been former friends of Evans, including Sam Ellis. Former Sheriff Dan Overall told Kay that his posse had lost the outlaws trail near Stokes Mountain. Sheriff Kay and railroad detectives then began interrogating George Sontag, who reportedly told them, “If you find me guilty of train robbery, you hang me up.”

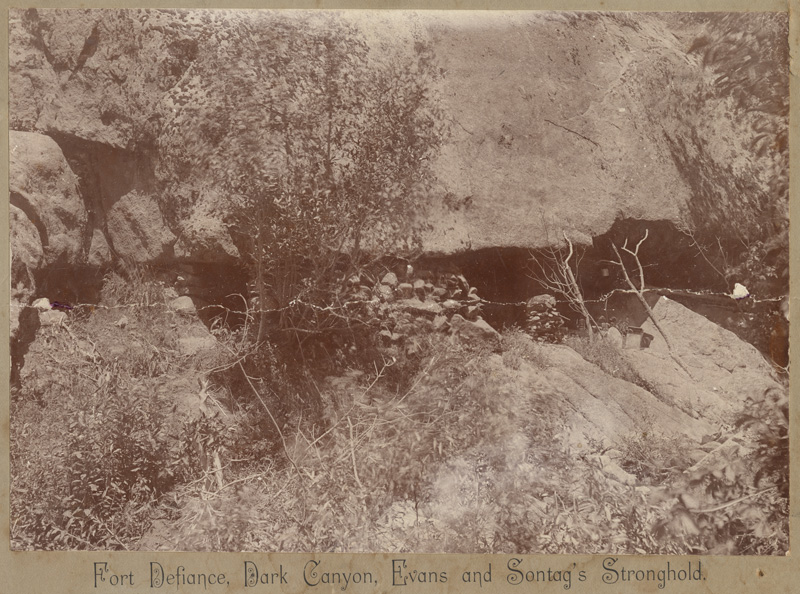
Fort Defiance, located in Dark Canyon, on Dry Creek

The next day a group of officers went to the Evans’ home and ransacked the place in front of the crying mother and children. The men cut open the families new furniture, knocked over baskets, turned over mattresses in search of stolen money. The next day, Sheriff Kay apologized to Mrs. Evans and paid her for the damages. The Evans family was always fond of the sheriff.

From then on afterward, there were several nights where members of the Evans family would catch detectives lurking around the property, hoping to catch sight of the outlaws.

On August 11, special agents from Yuma, Arizona, hired by the Southern Pacific specifically to capture Evans and Sontag, arrived in Visalia. This included former Texas Ranger, Vernon “Vic” C. Wilson, Yuma Deputy Frank Burke, and three Apache trackers; Jericho, Pelon, and Cameno Dulce. Vic Wilson soon began assembling his own posse to hunt the outlaws in the mountains. Detective Will Smith also tried to get a posse together, but was forced to join Wilson's after no one would join him. Also joining Wilson's posse was Constable Warren Hill of Sanger, George Witty's brother deputy Al Witty, and a former friend of Evans’, Andrew McGinnis, who had years before helped Chris collect debts to his stable business in Modesto after it burned down.

Also joining Wilson's posse was William Elam, a former acquaintance of both Evans and Sontag. He admired Wilson for being well educated and fearless, but did not approve of his methods. Elam knew that Evans and Sontag only traveled at night, and argued that if they set up posse members at strategic points along trails then eventually the outlaws would run into them. Once in the mountains however, Wilson insisted on following the trail during the day, while the outlaws remained in hiding. Soon afterwards, Elam resigned from the posse.

Eva Evans allegedly witnessed Vic Wilson telling a crowd in Visalia that he was going to the mountains and was going to add Evans and Sontag to the twenty-seven notches on his rifle. She then sent a letter to her father, through their friend Bill Downing, to warn him of Wilson and the Apaches. She would later write that in the letter she asked her father to kill Wilson.

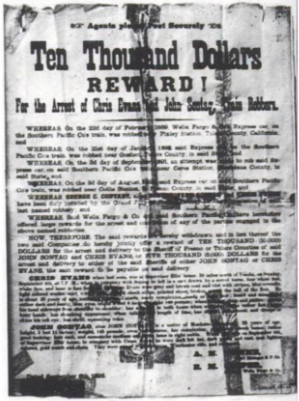
Old wanted poster for Evans and Sontag

On August 13, George Sontag attempted to chisel his way through the ceiling bars of the Visalia jail with a table knife, much like Grat Dalton had done a year prior. The jailer had heard the noise and officers decided to inspect George's cell. They found that he had removed the rivets from the bars and bent them back, leaving a large hole in the ceiling. George was then transferred to the jail in Fresno on August 16. The deputies had to protect him from a lynch mob as he was taken from the rail station to the jail. George would soon face trial for the robbery at Collis, and he hired several attorneys. His bail was fixed at $20,000.

On August 30, Wells Fargo Detectives James B. Hume and John Thacker, both known for capturing the famous stagecoach robber Black Bart, made an investigation of Evans’ home, assisted by Will Smith, Vic Wilson, and Frank Burke. They reported finding the stolen 1,700 Peruvian coins in two sacks buried in the back of Evans’ property. They also reported finding a mask which matched the description of the one used at the Collis robbery. The Evans family reported that the investigation was conducted while they were in Fresno, for George's preliminary grand jury examination, and accused the detectives of planting evidence.

Evans and Sontag had seen Kay's posse pass them in the mountains several times but did not attempt to kill any of the officers. Evans’ again noticed that his friend Sam Ellis had been a member, and he also had a deep respect for Sheriff Kay, so the officers were spared. On September 4, Evans and Sontag decided to pay a visit to the home of Sam Ellis in Wilcox Canyon. Ellis met Evans outside and offered to shake hands. Evans told him he would shake hands as long as he promised to never join another posse again, and that if he did he would kill him. Evans insisted that he was fighting the railroad, not the citizens of Tulare County, but that Sontag and he were innocent of any train robbery. Chris then demanded that Ellis give him a horse and cart and told him that they would stay till morning. When Sheriff Kay heard the news he rushed to the Ellis home but lost the outlaws' tracks, which seemed to lead towards the valley.

On September 6, 1892, Wells Fargo & Company and the Southern Pacific Railroad posted a bounty of $10,000 for the arrest and delivery of Chris Evans and John Sontag to Fresno or Tulare Counties. Soon afterwards, bounty hunters and additional lawmen employed by the S.P. railroad flooded into the region and over 3,000 men would be made deputies.

=== Shootout at Young's Cabin ===
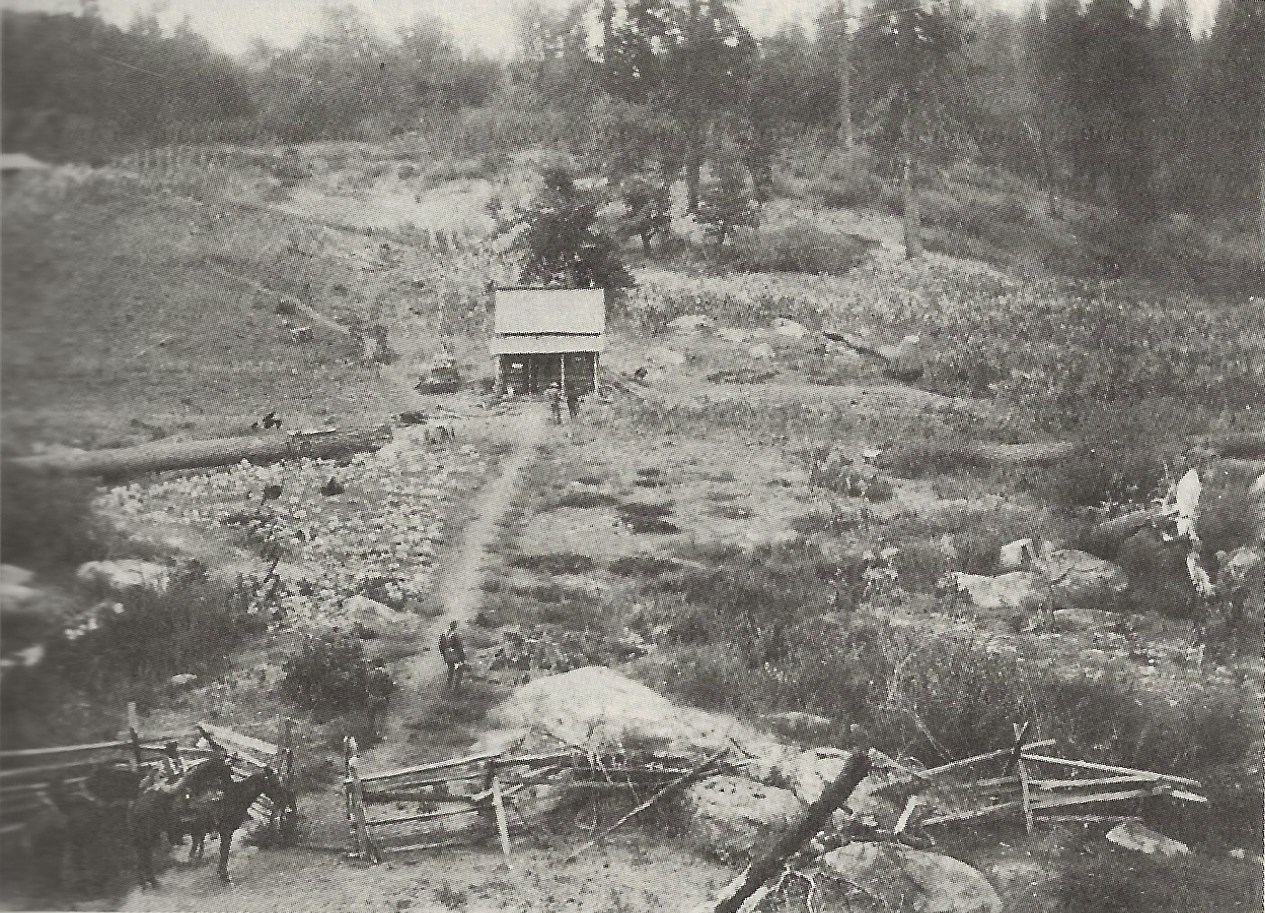
The shootout at Young's Cabin is re-enacted for the benefit of the photographer only a few days after the actual shootout, 1892

On September 8, Evans and Sontag were seen early in the morning at the livery stables in Traver. The two had made a short visit to Evans' home in Visalia the previous day unnoticed, even though the house was being watched almost constantly by deputies, and were then on their way back to the mountains. At the stables in Traver they had tried to awaken the proprietor but with no luck, so they decided to feed their horses themselves and left money with a note in appreciation. Sheriff Kay hurried with a posse to Traver and tracked the outlaws north east until he lost their tracks near Pine Flat, on the Kings River.

Evans and Sontag had many friends among the mountain people that were willing to provide shelter and aid to them. Several of these friends lived in the vicinity of Evans mine at Sampson's Flat. One of them was Evans’ friend Jim Young, who offered his cabin to the outlaws if they were ever in need of it. After camping for a few days they decided to visit Young's cabin, which was vacant at the time.

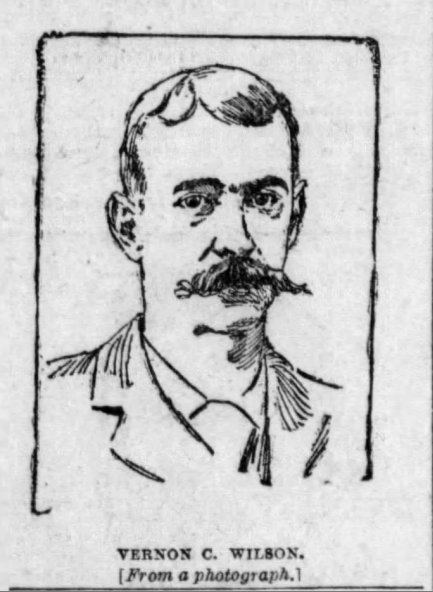
Vernon C. Wilson, San Francisco Examiner, September 15, 1892

Meanwhile, Vic Wilson's posse had also been in the vicinity of Sampson's Flat tracking the outlaws, but suspected them to be higher in the mountains. The posse had run into Evans’ friend Clark Moore, who told them he was headed to Visalia. The Apaches, Pelon and Cameno, followed the outlaws' tracks to a ranch near Clark Moore's home, where they were surprised to find Moore visiting his neighbor. Wilson then suspected Moore of aiding and abetting the outlaws after he would not deny that he had been visiting them. Wilson allegedly told Clark that he hoped to see him with Evans so he could kill them both. The posse then backtracked Moore to a camp that Evans and Sontag had used only days earlier. Here they found several newspaper clippings about the outlaws and a pair of red overalls which Pelon decided to wear.

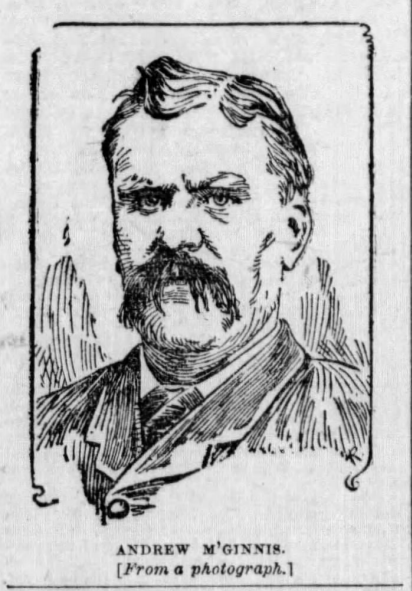
Andrew McGinnis, San Francisco Examiner, September 15, 1892

Around nine o’clock on the morning of September 13, a neighbor of Jim Young named Ed Mainwaring, walked in on Evans and Sontag at Young's cabin. Evans recognized Mainwaring and introduced him to Sontag. He then asked if he would help them prepare breakfast. Mainwaring told Evans and Sontag that he had run into Vic Wilson's posse and that Wilson had made several threats to him. Evans assured him that he had seen the posse go to the valley that Sunday and that he did not think they would come back. At around 11 o’clock, while they were cooking breakfast, Chris spotted Wilson's posse approaching the property gate, seventy yards away. The Apaches had tracked them to the cabin. Realizing they were trapped, Evans and Sontag ordered Mainwaring to take a bucket to a spring a few hundred feet away and to not make any indication the cabin was occupied. The posse spotted Mainwaring leaving the cabin and assumed it was empty. The lawmen dismounted and began helping themselves to a watermelon patch in the yard. Wilson and McGinnis then began to approach the front door to inspect the cabin.

As the men got close, Sontag suddenly swung the front door open and shot Andrew McGinnis with his double-barrelled shotgun. Vic Wilson went for his revolver, but Evans stuck his double barrel through the window and shot him in the chest. Evans picked up his Winchester, stepped out the front door, walked over Wilson, and began firing on the remaining posse members at the gate.

One of Evans' slugs struck Al Witty in the neck, and Will Smith's horse bucked him off. Smith ran after his horse and Frank Burke fled down a gulch as Evans rushed them with his rifle. Evans and Sontag then ran for cover behind a fallen oak tree while the Apaches fired at them from behind a rock. Constable Warren Hill's horse was hit and killed, so he grabbed Burke's horse and sped off in retreat. As the outlaws turned to flee, Sontag was hit in the arm. McGinnis then regained consciousness and was able to fire a round, which grazed off Evans’ eyebrow. As McGinnis pulled the lever of his gun to fire another shot, Evans shot him through the head. The two were then able to escape through a cornfield at the back of the cabin.

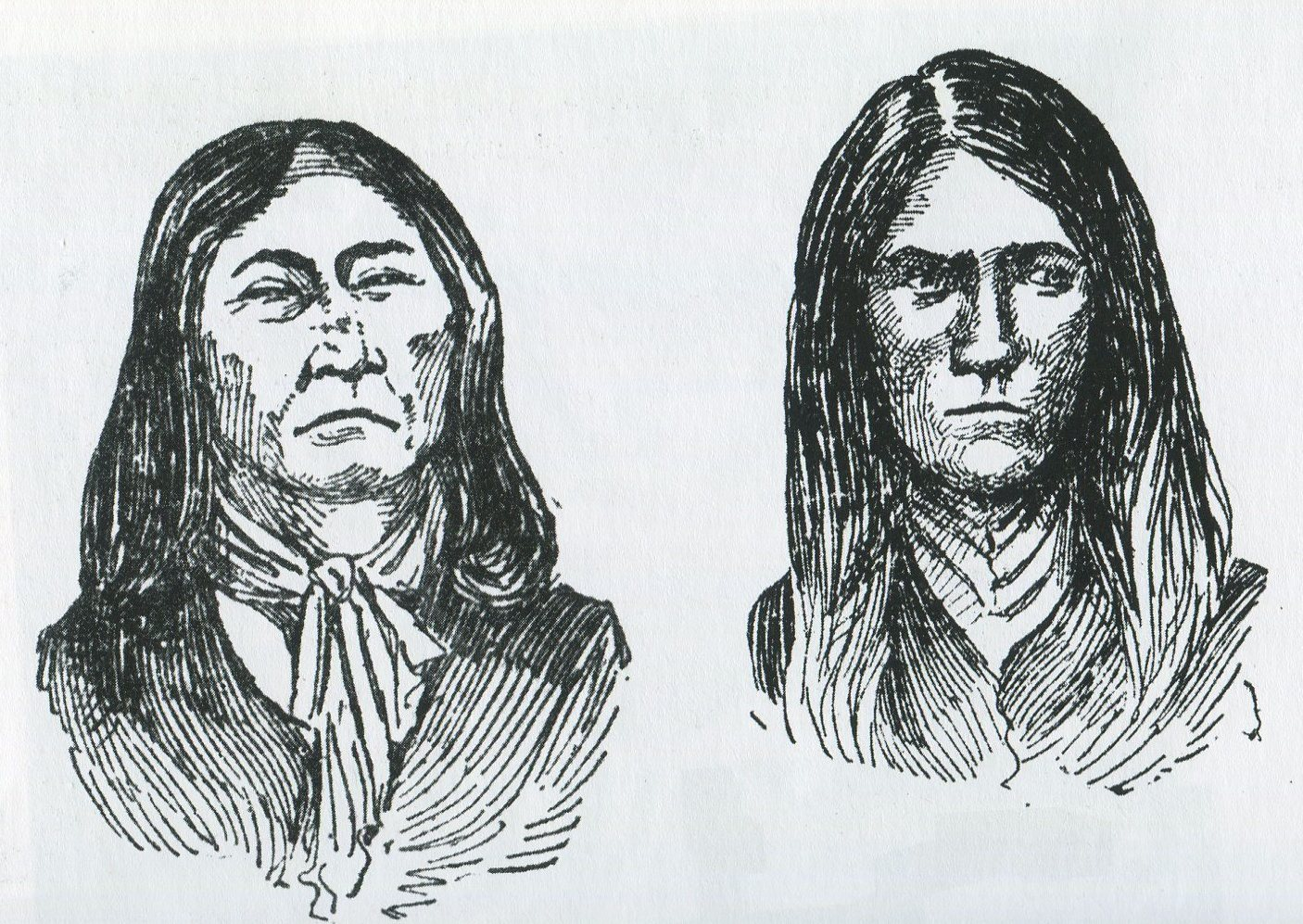
Pelon and Camino Dulce

After the remaining lawmen realized Evans and Sontag had fled, they searched the cabin. They found two hundred rounds of ammunition as well as Evans’ shotgun. They then took the two dead Arizona officers back to Visalia. Evans wrapped Sontag's wound and the two were able to make it to the Downing ranch on Dry Creek, about twenty miles away from Sampson's Flat. Jane Downing nursed John back to health for ten days.

After the shootout at Young's cabin, which resulted in the deaths of Vic Wilson and Andrew McGinnis, the bounty for Evans and Sontag was increased to $11,500. It was also announced that, instead of arrest and delivery, the outlaws were wanted dead or alive.

On September 19, Clark Moore was arrested by Fresno County Sheriff Hensley after being suspected of aiding the outlaws. He was released, but only as long as he promised to remain in town. Sheriff Kay's posse tracked the outlaws to the Sequoia mills before losing their tracks, which led toward the direction of Redwood Mountain. They were then seen in the vicinity of Eshom Valley, where Sheriff Hensley had taken a posse to find them. Both posse's were unsuccessful in locating the outlaws.

=== Media coverage ===
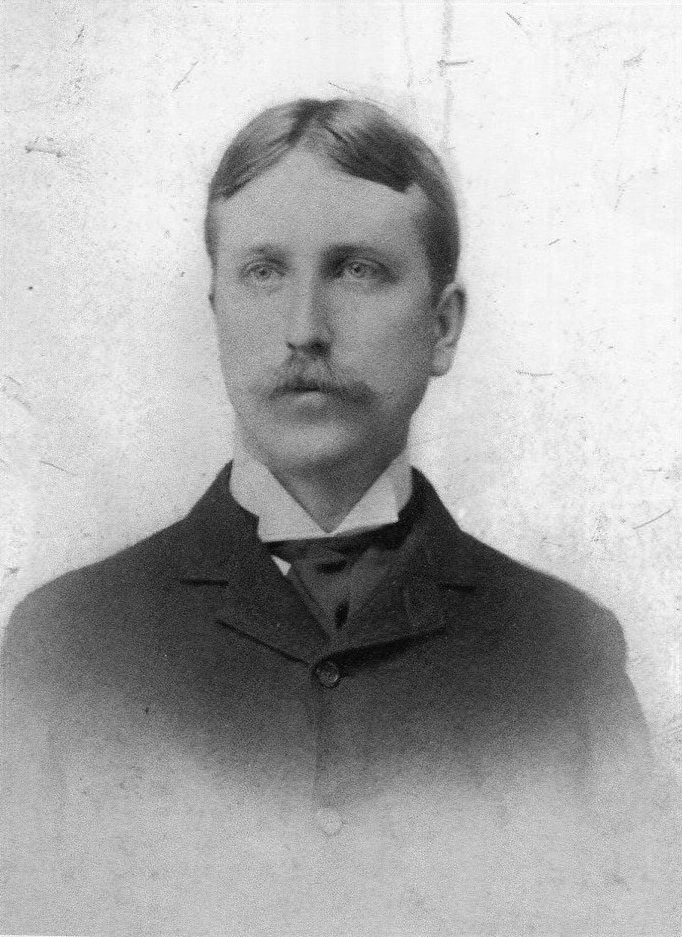
William Randolph Hearst took over the San Francisco Examiner in 1887

The events of Evans and Sontag were widely publicized and had created a sensation throughout the country. While most Visalia reporters were spiteful of Evans because they felt he had given their city bad publicity, they all agreed that he had been a respected citizen before being accused of train robbery. No newspapers covered the outlaws more extensively however than the San Francisco papers, especially the San Francisco Examiner, led by the 29-year-old William Randolph Hearst. After the events that took place at the Evans home that August, the Examiner wrote about the outlaws almost daily.

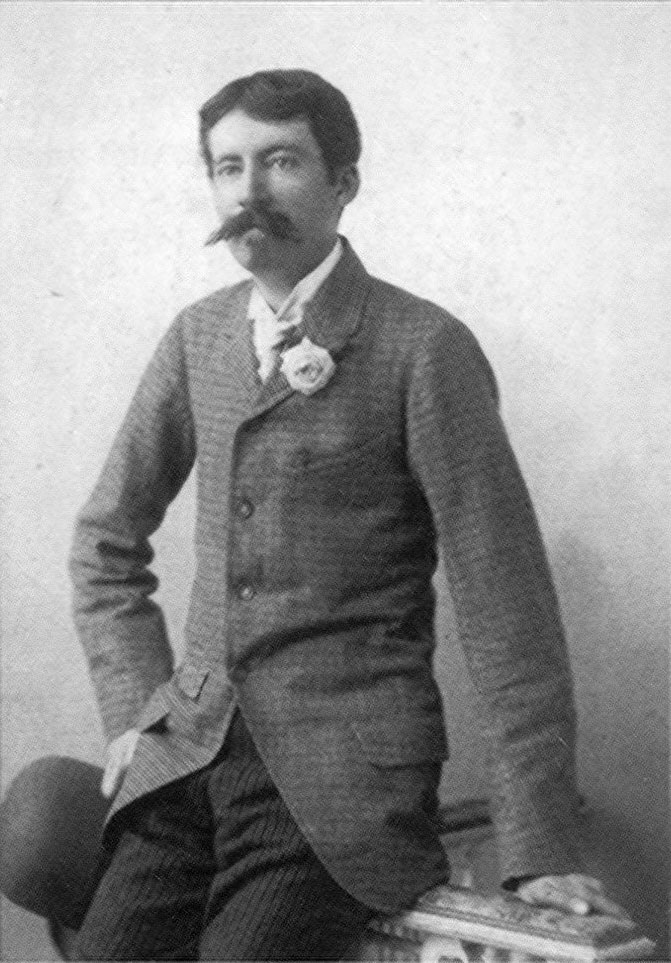
Henry "Petey" Bigelow

Unlike newspapers such as the Visalia Times or the Fresno Republican, the Examiner offered the most detailed version of events, often lending the entire front page to the outlaws. Also unlike other papers, the Examiner often came to sympathize with the outlaws in an attempt to appeal to the common man, and those who despised the corruption of the Southern Pacific. Hearst's father had also competed with Leland Stanford for a seat in the U.S. Senate. Some journalists for the Examiner, such as Ambrose Bierce, even criticized the officers hunting the outlaws of being cowards and inefficient. Although Hearst's competition in San Francisco and elsewhere tried to keep up with him, he had a larger wealth of resources to use in acquiring information. While the Examiner seemed to champion the outlaws' cause, other newspapers were heavily critical of Evans and Sontag, considering them guilty before they would even go to trial.

Hearst sent several reporters, photographers and sketch artists to Visalia, including reporter Henry “Pete” D. Bigelow. On October 7, the story of the Dalton Gang's death in Coffeyville was quickly overshadowed when Bigelow published a story in the Examiner of how he obtained a personal interview with Evans and Sontag. On September 27, Bigelow was interviewing residents of the mountains with Evans’ friend Clark Moore, to see how they had been treated by the outlaws and detectives. One evening, Bigelow asked Moore if they could stop at the cabin of John Coffee for dinner. When Moore arrived at the door he was surprised to find Evans and Sontag inside and asked if they would be willing to grant Bigelow an interview. They happily obliged him. Bigelow then sat with the outlaw in the back bedroom, taking down their version of recent events. In the interview, Evans and Sontag attested their innocence. Although they did not deny that they killed any men, they claimed it was in self-defense, and that they were being unjustly hunted by “blood-hunters”. Evans also expressed anger over how the lawmen had treated his family, and pledged revenge against detective Will Smith.

The Fresno Republican and Tulare Times accused Bigelow's interview of being fabricated, but a letter later sent to the Examiner, signed by Evans and Sontag, authenticated the interview.

Along with the reporters from the Examiner, there were also several reporters who rode with the different posses that roamed the mountains, including one reporter, Joe P. Carroll, who served as war correspondent for several different papers.

=== George Sontag's trial ===
During that October, Chris and John drove a cart into Fresno with the intent of freeing George. When they observed the jail from a church across the street, they saw Sheriff Hensley and eight deputies standing out front. Evans respected Hensley, considering him different from the railroad detectives and bounty hunters. He did not want to kill him, so the plan was aborted. The two then allegedly planned to lure the Fresno officers into the mountains with the intent of attacking the jail while it was poorly defended. They were dissuaded by Clark Moore who reasoned that, if they failed to free George, a mob would rush the jail and he would be lynched.

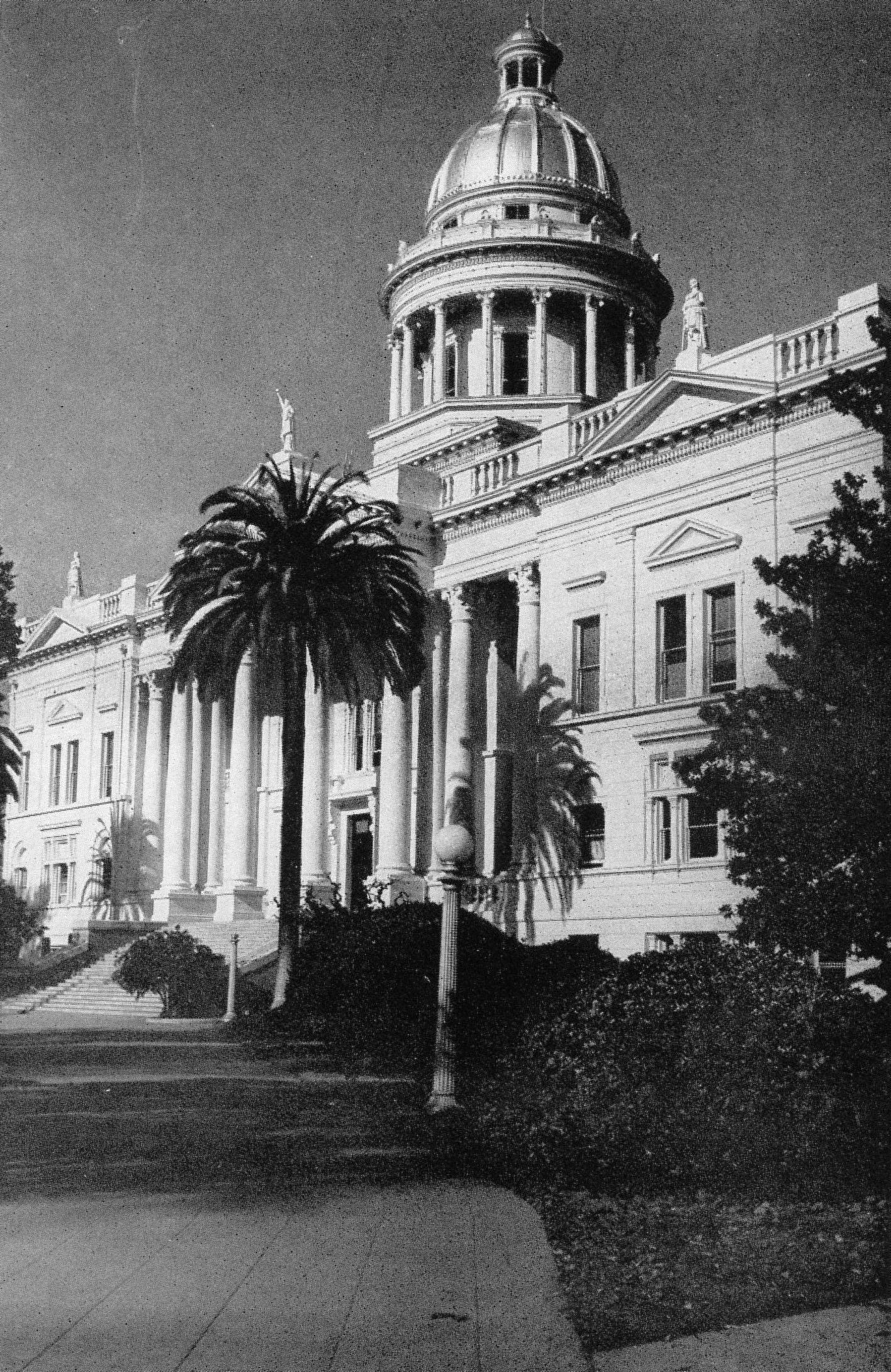
The old Fresno County Courthouse

The trial of George C. Contant, a.k.a. Sontag, at the Fresno County Courthouse, was opened by Judge Homes on October 21, 1892. Seated next to George in the packed courtroom were Eva, Mrs. Evans, and his lawyers. George seemed to be in a carefree mood, laughing with the Evans family and shaking hands with friends, many of whom had brought him fine cigars and edibles. So many people came to shake his hand that, when the court adjourned, officers did not allow anyone to stand up until George had been taken back to his cell. Forty-two witnesses were called to the stand, nine for George and the rest for the prosecution. Witnesses were mostly passengers of the train robbed at Collis but also included Clark Moore, Eva and Mrs. Evans. Chris Evans sent a letter to the court reading, “I am innocent, and doing nicely, thank you.”

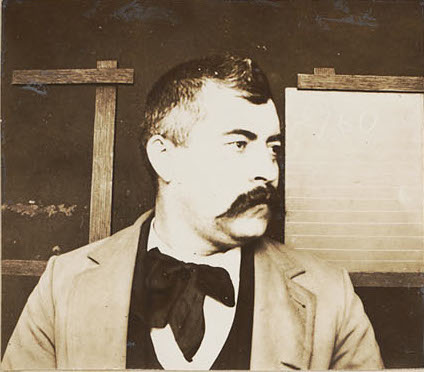
George C. Contant (a.k.a. George Sontag), 1892.

The defense attempted to postpone the trial until George's main witnesses, Chris and John, could appear in court. The courtroom filled with laughter and the defense was overruled. Eva and Mrs. Evans were the first witnesses called to the stand and were asked by the prosecution if they recognized the red mask that had been found at the scene of the Collis robbery, as well as the identical mask found in the Evans’ barn. Both denied ever seeing either of the masks. The prosecution and defense then attempted to show the activities of George, John and Chris prior to the Collis robbery on August 3 through witnesses and available evidence.

The defense claimed that George bought a train ticket in Mankato for Fresno on July 7, and arrived on July 14. John met George in Fresno and arranged for him to take a mail-carrier from Reedley to Dunlap, where he would meet Chris before making their way to his mine at Sampson Flat. John then left Fresno to take George's trunk to the Evans’ home in Visalia. George disliked the idea of waiting in the sleepy town of Reedley, so he instead spent some days getting drunk with a girlfriend and fishing near Mendota. He then finally made his way to Dunlap on July 23, where he met Chris. The two stayed at Sampson Flat until August 1, when they left for Visalia, taking turns riding a black mare owned by Clark Moore.

In order to handle some business in Fresno related to his mining claim, Chris split up from George and left him to ride the rest of the way to Visalia alone. George spent the night with his brother at Grandmother Byrd's home, next door to the Evans’ home, where John rented a room. John was surprised to see George and said that he had rented a team at the stables to meet him in the mountains. George told him that Chris had gone to Fresno, so John left the next morning to pick him up. Before he left, John told George to stay in Visalia until he returned. George originally intended to obey his brother's wish, but then began to miss his Fresno girlfriend. After taking a train to Fresno, he began making his way to Roeding Park to meet her when he accidentally ran into John on the street. John was annoyed with him, but George promised his brother he would return to Visalia on the evening train. While waiting for his train, George decided to get a drink at a local saloon but ended up missing it after getting drunk. He then decided to take the midnight train, which arrived three hours late due to the robbery at Collis. He learned from the passengers what had happened during the robbery and arrived in Visalia at five in the morning. He rented a room at the Palace Hotel, where he decided to get a “morning pick-me-up” at the bar, and began telling the bartender and others about the robbery. John and Chris arrived in Visalia together later that morning. George then met with his brother, did some drinking at the saloons downtown, and was later picked up by deputy George Witty for questioning. Mrs. Evans and Clark Moore also testified on George's behalf, as did several other witnesses, but the only real evidence that was presented in his defense was his own alibi.

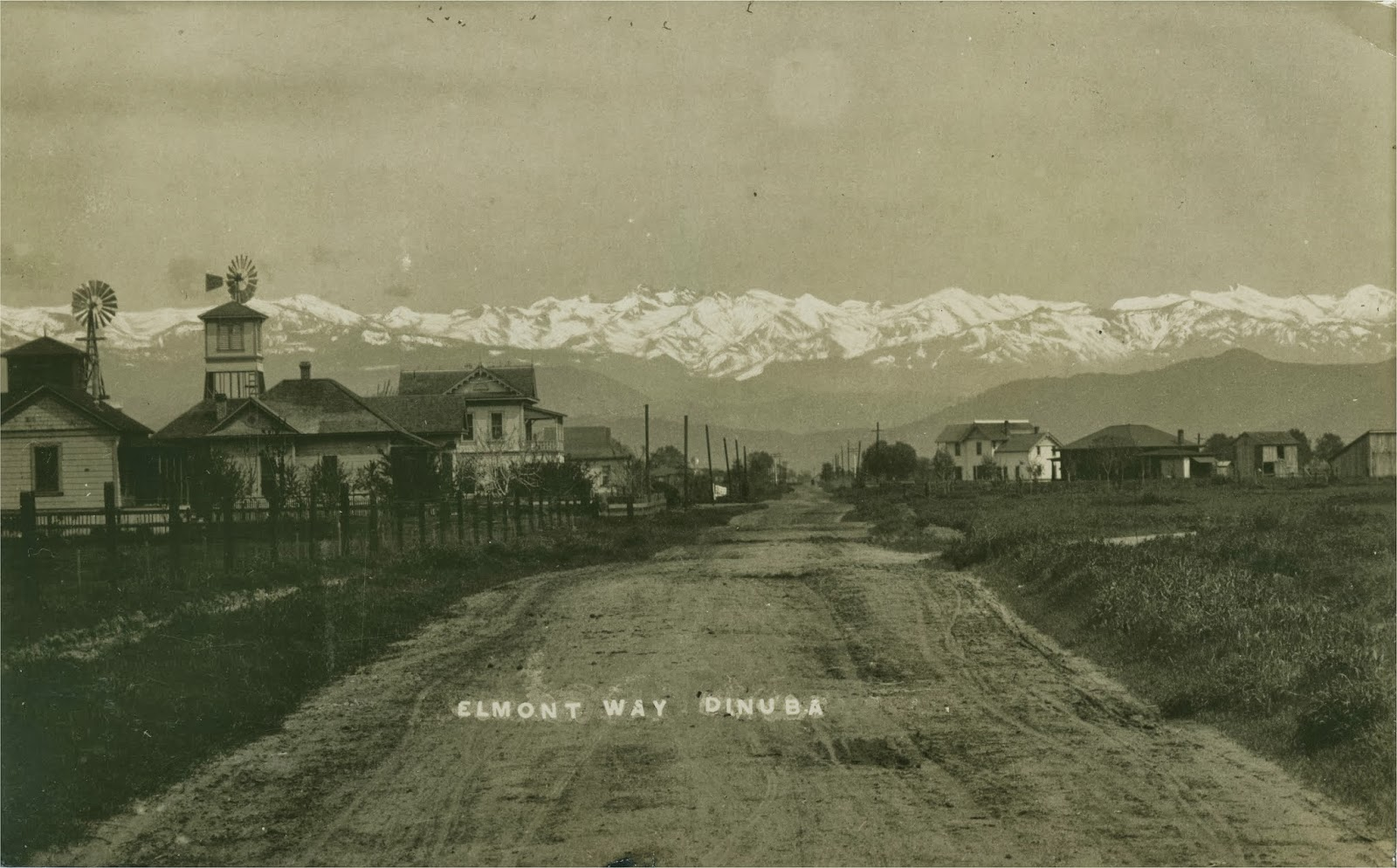
View of the Southern Sierra Nevada, where Evans and Sontag hid out for months in 1892-1893 (Looking east from Dinuba 1907, 16 miles northwest of Visalia, 5 miles southeast of Reedley)

The prosecution, District Attorney's Terry and Tupper, tried to accuse George of being present in Mendota in order to scope potential sites for a robbery. They also claimed that they would prove that John had rented the team at the stables in Visalia, drove to Fresno with George and picked up Chris, then committed the robbery at Collis. They claimed that John, who George Witty had seen walking on a limp, was waiting with a team for the escape while George and Chris robbed the train. The engineer of the train at Collis, described the shorter robber as having an Irish-Canadian accent and brown hair with a reddish beard, which matched the description of Chris Evans. It was also noted by the prosecution that dynamite was used in the robbery, which Evans was experienced with using as a miner. The prosecution was however unable to get any of the witnesses to identify George as the robber, other than his general appearance. Detective James Hume also took the stand for the prosecution, displaying the stolen Peruvian coins that he had dug up on the Evans property on August 30. The defense protested that much of the evidence being shown had to do with John and Chris, not the defendant, but was overruled. George was the last witness called to the stand and he gave his alibi. He finally shocked the court, when he admitted that he held his own suspicions that Chris and John had committed the robbery.

On October 30, after only fifteen minutes of deliberation, the jury reached a verdict of guilty and George Sontag was sentenced to life imprisonment. The defense requested a new trial due to insufficient evidence, but was denied. Outside the courtroom, George told reporters that he was mistaken, believing Evans and his brother to be innocent. He was sent to Folsom State Prison on November 2.

Following George's trial, Clark Moore was immediately arrested as an accessory to murder for harboring Evans and Sontag. He faced arraignment in December and had his own trial set for March.

=== Winter interlude ===
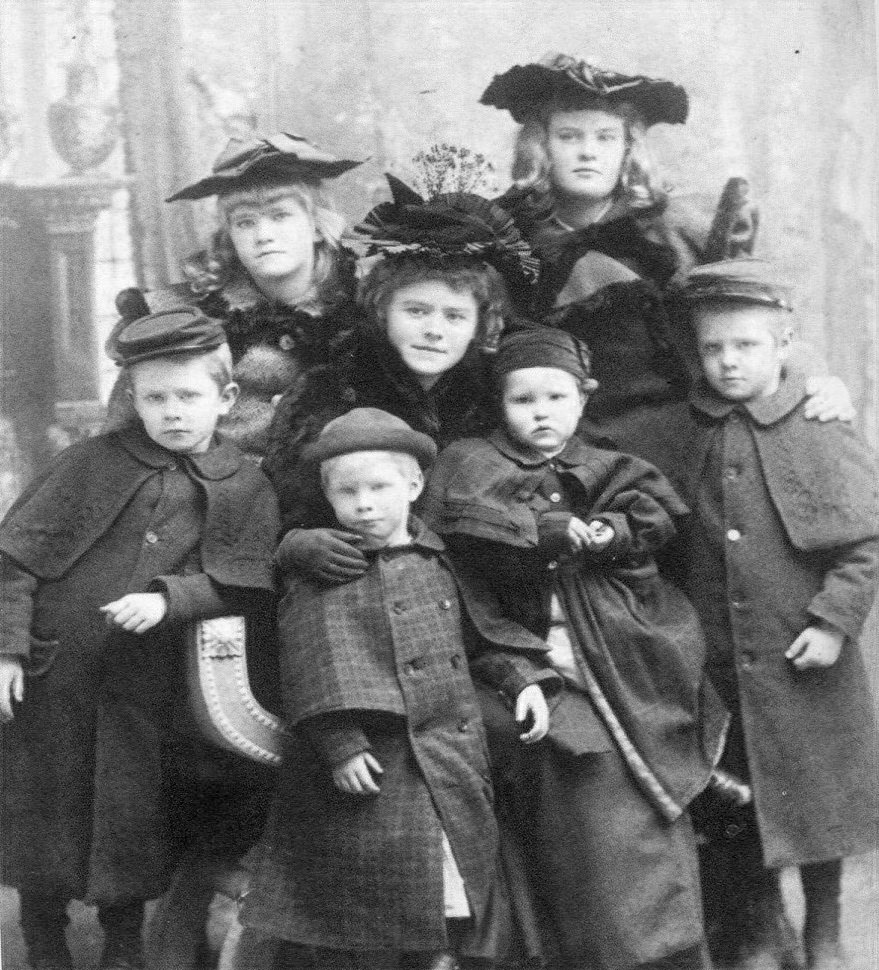
The Evans children in 1894, (left-to-right)(in back) Ynez, Winifred, (Center) Eva, (Front) Joseph Francis, John Christopher, Patrick Carl (Baby Carl), Louis Napoleon

In November 1892, the Evans family was given a notice by Sol Sweet & Co. of foreclosure on their Visalia home. Molly Evans was forced to take her children to her mother's home next door. During this time, Eva would make several incognito trips to visit her father and her fiancé in the mountains. She would sneak out in the middle of the night, dressed as a farm boy, and would ride her grandmother's horse to their hideouts at Fort Defiance or Camp Manzanita. The winter weather acted as a deterrent for lawmen to search for Evans and Sontag in the snow-covered mountains. While there were a few hardened bounty hunters still active in the area, most held up in the local saloons and hotels that winter.

Although there were still sightings of the outlaws, the winter months were relatively quiet and peaceful. Chris and John had not dared to keep a fire during the months prior in fear of being discovered, but they kept warm and comfortable that winter. They spent most of their time traveling around and calling on friends for dinner or lunch and in the evenings they would play card games of euchre or seven-up.

After hearing the news of the foreclosure on his family's home and George's conviction, Chris decided that they would make the risky visit to Visalia to be with his family for the holidays. Chris and John spent two weeks at Grandmother Byrd's in the upper bedroom that had previously been occupied by John. They were able to sneak into town unnoticed and Grandmother Byrd's home was large enough to offer them plenty of privacy. On Christmas, they had their meals brought to them, and their presence was kept secret from Evans’ children, except for the three oldest. While Chris seemed to be in a joyous and optimistic mood, John was depressed and told Eva that he felt his days were numbered.

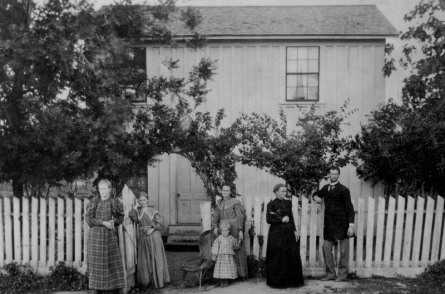
Grandmother Byrd's home on Strawberry and N.W. 2nd Ave. (Left-to-right) Winifred, Eva, Molly with baby Carl, Grandmother Byrd, George Byrd (Molly's brother)

The Christmas holiday became strained at the Byrd’ home when Molly's brother, Perry Byrd, told her that Chris should be burned at the stake for his crimes. During this time, plans were made by the Evans family for the outlaws to escape to South America with the help of a prominent benefactor, later rumored to have been M. Theo Kearney, “Raisin King of California”. However, these plans would never come to fruition. Chris also told Eva that they had formulated a plan to free George from Folsom prison and asked her if she would be able to help them when the time came.

Before returning to the mountains, the two outlaws decided to go shopping in Fresno. Disguised as farmers delivering produce, they were able to buy new shoes and clothes undetected.

In February 1893, Examiner reporter Pete Bigelow invited Eva Evans to accompany him to Sacramento. California's Governor, Henry Markham, was brought under pressure to send the state militia to hunt Evans and Sontag. Bigelow thought Eva should come with him to persuade the governor otherwise. After they were assured that the militia would not be sent, the two then went on a trip to San Francisco, where Bigelow introduced Eva to his wife and children and showed her his office at the Examiner. They also attended a night at the Tivoli Opera House.

=== Spring headlines ===
On March 13, Clark Moore went to trial in Fresno for aiding and abetting. Moore attested that he had only met with the outlaws by accident. Pete Bigelow was called to the stand to explain how Moore played a role in setting up the famous interview with Evans and Sontag, but Bigelow insisted that they had accidentally run into the outlaws. Bigelow was then made to explain why he had taken Moore on a trip to San Francisco and had paid all the expenses. Bigelow insisted that he was only paying Moore back for his time spent in the Sierras. Mrs. Evans was also called to the stand to explain why she had been seen by Vic Wilson's posse in the vicinity of Sampson Flat on September 10, 1892, but she noted that Clark Moore had nothing to do with her trip. Moore was acquitted the following day.

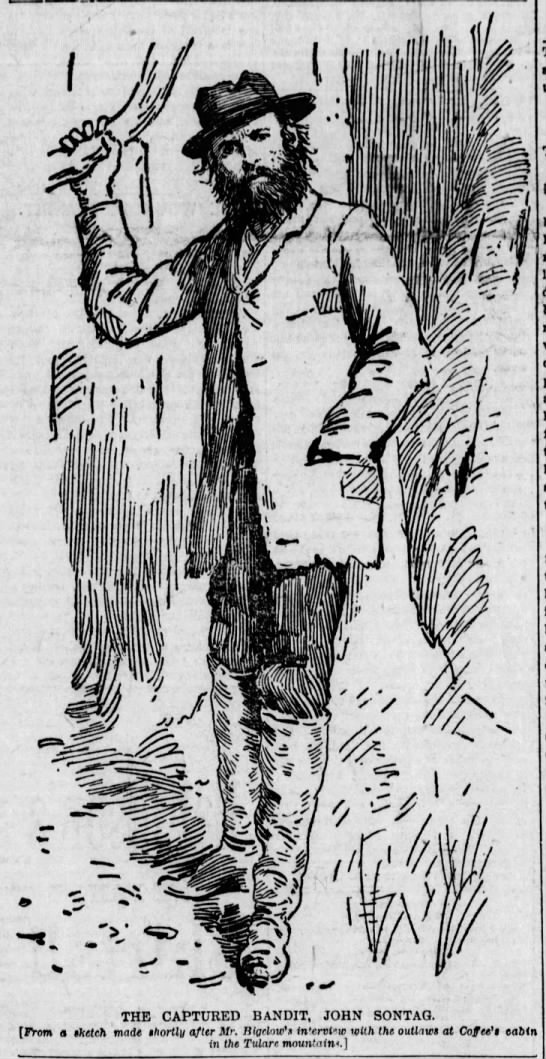
John Sontag, San Francisco Examiner 1892

On April 6, Evans and Sontag were reported to have been seen near Red Rock, on the north fork of the Kings River. A posse of detectives were close on their trail, and had discovered their camp where they had done some cooking only a few hours earlier. The posse claimed to be hindered by deep snow. They sent a scout ahead to continue after the outlaws, but he lost them as they made their way into the canyons of the Kings River, deep in the mountains. On April 19, Sheriff Kay learned from a boy that Evans and Sontag were visiting their family at the Byrd’ home in Visalia. Kay wanted to avoid involving the Evans family in a crossfire, so he planned to set up an ambush outside of town. Kay had his deputies set up positions on both roads leaving town, and then watched the movements at the Byrd’ home with another deputy. If the outlaws took one road, Kay would signal his men with one shot, and if they took the other he would signal them with two shots. At midnight, Kay spotted two men exit the Byrd’ barn with a team and cart. He then watched them head down the road towards the mountains. Kay fired one shot and his deputies began firing at the outlaws. Chris and John whipped their horses and jumped into their cart as bullets were showered at them. Their horses were hit several times, but the outlaws escaped unscathed. Kay was heavily criticized and was even accused by newspapers of wanting the outlaws to escape.

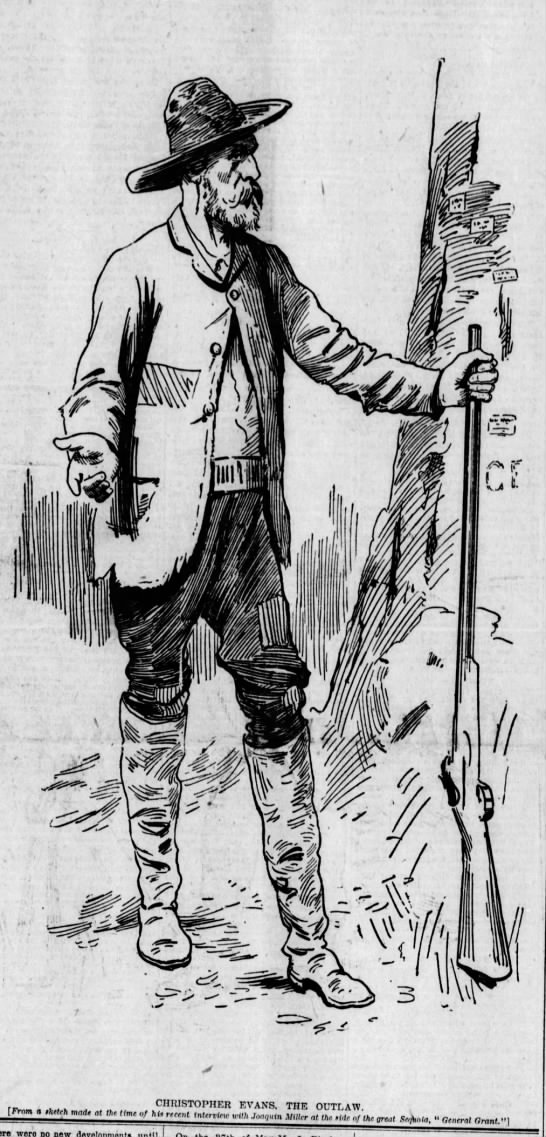
Chris Evans, San Francisco Examiner April 29, 1893

Eva notified her father that detective Will Smith had planned to take a stagecoach to the Sequoia Mills. The two outlaws had planned to ambush the detective, whom Evans had sworn to kill on sight. On April 30, Evans and Sontag held up this stagecoach about a mile from Camp Badger, looking for Smith. The outlaws' appearance had changed drastically, as they wore long shaggy beards but had their hair cut short by a barber in the mountains. Evans and Sontag both carried Winchester rifles, a shotgun, and a revolver in each pocket. They told the men that working men were alright, but said any officers were to lay on the road. When the driver was interrogated on the whereabouts of Will Smith he told the outlaws that the detective had bought a ticket, but failed to show up that morning after being called to report to the railroad headquarters in San Francisco. Chris and John indicated that they were tired of being hunted by bounty hunters and had decided that they were going to do some hunting themselves. They told the passengers that they were innocent of train robbery and after searching the group they returned their belongings. They then followed the stage to Millwood, a logging town near Sequoia Lake, where they had dinner with the lumbermen and were given a tour of the mill.

Meanwhile, George Sontag had been making friends while locked up in Folsom. George was somewhat of a celebrity in prison and many were drawn to him. One prisoner who was close to George was Frank "Smiling" Williams, who had been convicted of stage robbery. Williams had been in the Fresno jail in the cell across from George before they were both sent to Folsom, and had even been caught playing cards in Georges cell when the latter tried to escape through the ceiling with a table knife. Like George he had received a life sentence, and the two shared an interest in making an escape. Since there were no walls surrounding Folsom prison, there had been numerous escapes since it had opened in 1880, and the two felt confident they would be successful. Williams introduced George to a young German immigrant named William Fredericks, who was scheduled to be released soon and agreed to help them in their plan. George told Fredericks that they needed someone to bring them guns. George had been writing to Eva in code and was working with her on obtaining weapons. Fredericks was instructed to go to Visalia to the Evans family upon his release, and ask for Mr. Bolivar. This was a nickname John had given Chris, comparing him to the South American revolutionary, Simón Bolívar. George knew that if Fredericks asked for Mr. Bolivar, he would be known as a friend.

George's cellmate had been a spy for the warden, Charles Aull, and notified him of George's plan. When Fredericks was paroled on May 26, the warden called him into his office and told him that he knew he was going to attempt to help Evans and Sontag bring weapons for George, and warned him that if he did so he would be shot on sight. Fredericks did not admit to anything and left for Visalia.

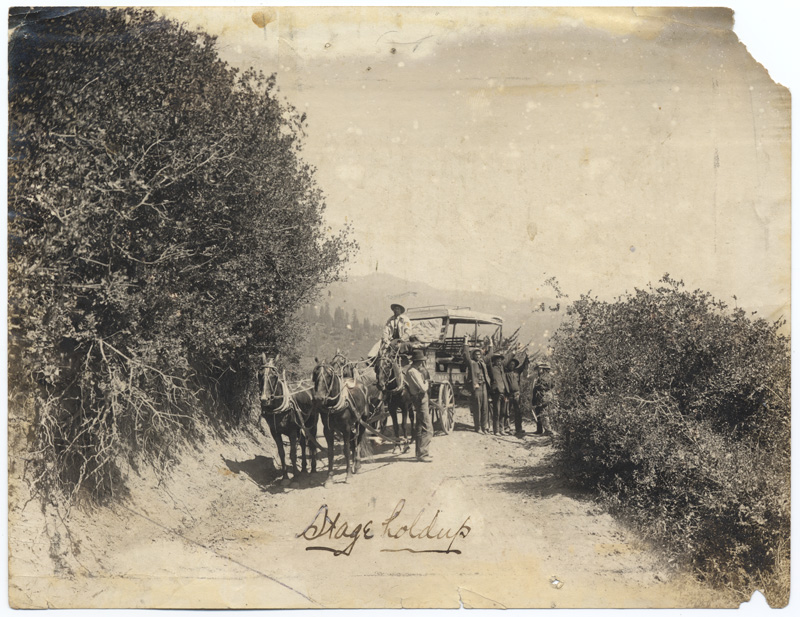
Reenactment of the stage holdup by Evans and Sontag

Evans and Sontag were tired of bounty hunters on their trail and decided that they would go on the offensive. On May 27, Deputy Marshal Samuel Black, who had been hunting the outlaws since October, was shot several times while returning to his cabin from the saloon at Camp Badger with his friend Tom Burns. This was attributed to Evans and Sontag, as Black had received a warning from the outlaws through their friend to leave the mountains. Black survived but afterwards decided to give up hunting the outlaws. He told newspapers that residents of Camp Badger had been supporting Evans and Sontag and reported to them the activities of nearby lawmen.

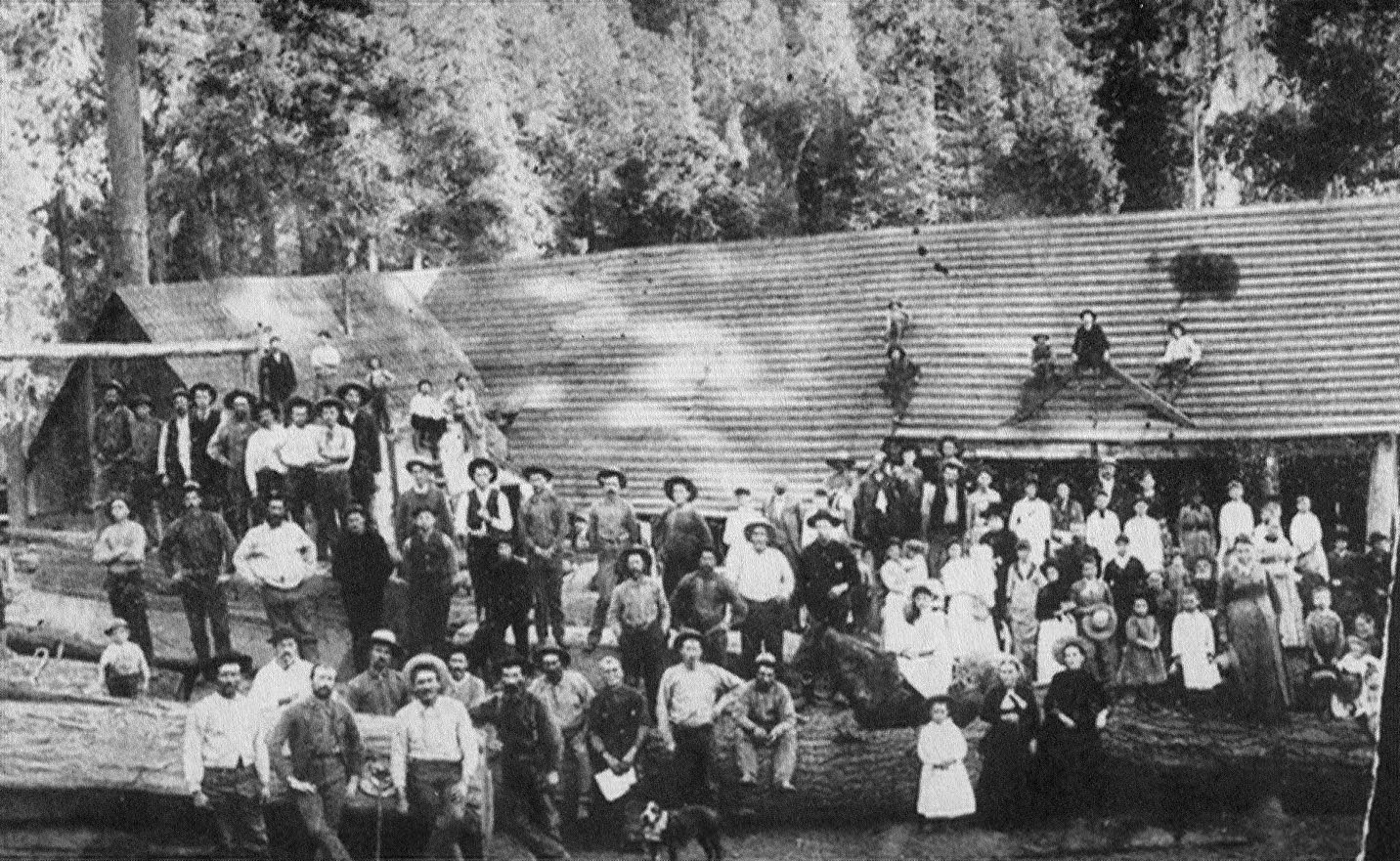
Millwood, near Sequoia Lake, 1893, Chris Evans is in the front row, dark clothes, beard, leaning against the log to the left of the dog

Wells Fargo Detective John N. Thacker, previous Sheriff of Humboldt County, had become frustrated with the efforts to catch Evans and Sontag. He believed the situation had gotten completely out of control and decided to send a telegram to U.S. Marshal George Gard of Los Angeles. On May 31, the two secretly met in Fresno and planned to organize a small undercover operation to capture or kill Evans and Sontag. They assembled a posse that included Fresno deputies Rapelje and Jackson, and Thomas Burns of the Morse Detective Agency, who were then deputized by Gard as deputy marshals. Gard then filed charges in Federal Court against Evans and Sontag claiming that, when they robbed the train at Collis, they had destroyed U.S. government receptacles and interfered with the delivery of U.S. mail. The U.S. district attorney in Los Angeles then issued warrants for Gard, who began searching the mountains with his posse.

On June 4, the famous poet Joaquin Miller released an interview with Evans and Sontag for the San Francisco Examiner titled, The Bard and The Bandit, which he claimed took place under the General Grant tree in Sequoia National Park. Miller met with the Evans family in Visalia, with whom he formed what would become a lifelong friendship. Eva Evans would later write that the interview at the General Grant tree had been faked in order to serve as a decoy to distract the lawmen. The interview had no actual quotes from the outlaws and did not compare to Bigelow's earlier interview.

On June 8, Sheriff Kay received two tips that Evans and Sontag had spent the night at the Byrd’ home in Visalia and had left in broad daylight. He heard rumors that the two outlaws snuck into the house dressed as women. Kay surrounded the house and people gathered in the streets and atop of rooftops waiting to see a shootout. Kay then realized the outlaws had escaped and dismissed his men. The next day there were reports that the outlaws had returned and Kay again surrounded the house, but Molly told the lawmen that her husband had not been home for some time.

== Stone Corral ==
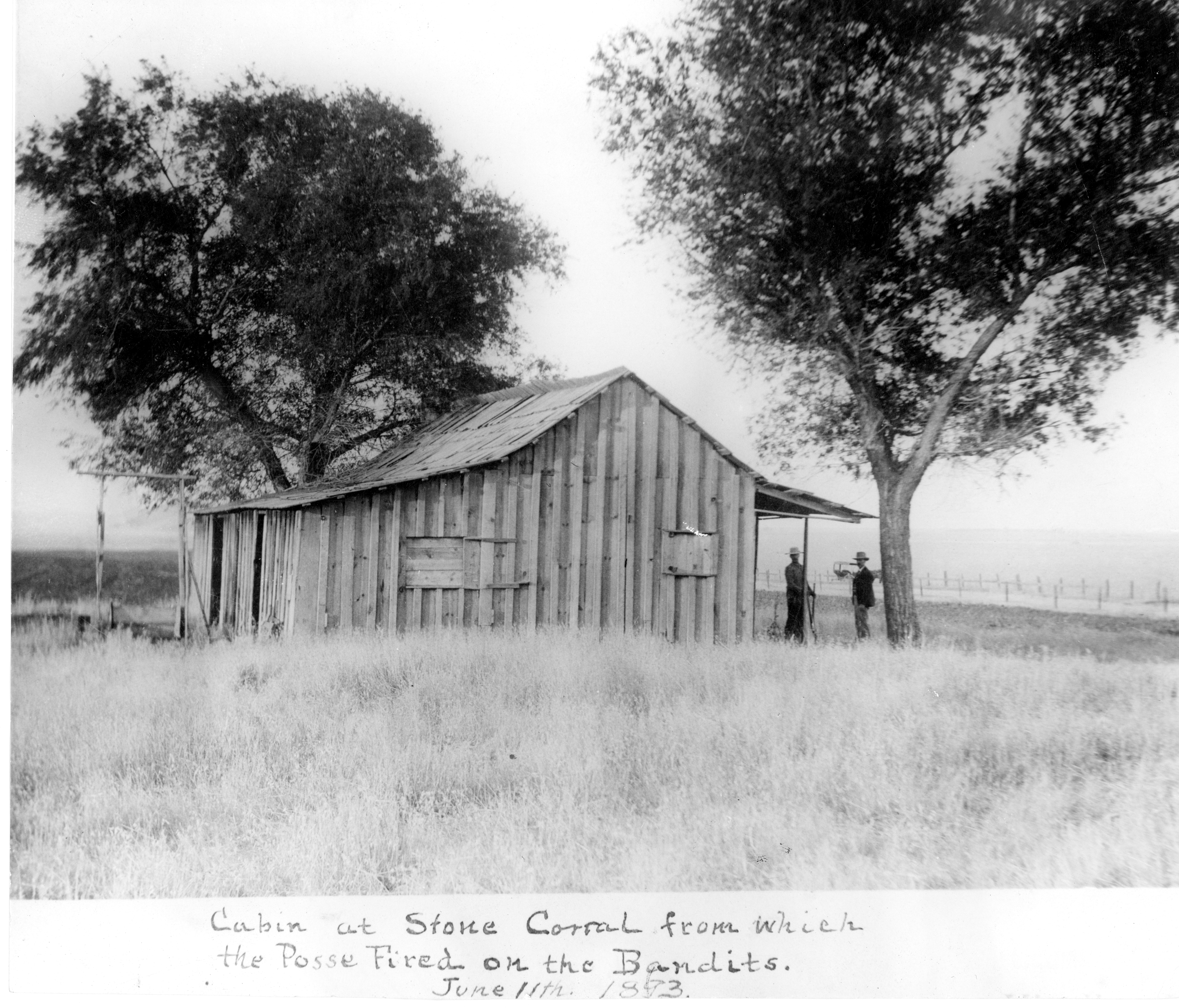
Cabin at Stone Corral, 1893

On June 10, 1893, Marshal George Gard and his posse set up at an old abandoned cabin at the Old Stone Corral, near Stokes Mountain. Evans’ brother-in-law Perry Byrd, still a deputy for Sheriff Kay, discovered that Evans and Sontag had used the pass at the Stone Corral before to get back and forth from Visalia and notified Marshal Gard. On June 11, the posse spent the day escaping the hundred degree heat at the cabin. The lawmen were exhausted from searching for the outlaws the past week and needed to rest. While two men slept, the other two kept watch of the trail from inside.

Evans and Sontag had been making their way out of the mountains to Visalia, as Chris had heard that Molly had a nervous breakdown and needed to assemble a family conference. They left Fort Defiance the morning of June 10 and the next day made camp on a hill one mile southeast of the home of their family friends, the Perkins, in Wilcox Canyon. The Evans family had always thought of the Perkins as family, Molly's brother Perry was married to the oldest Perkins girl, and it was the Evans house where the Perkins would stay whenever they came to Visalia. Chris and John had visited the Perkins home several times to receive aid since becoming outlaws. On their latest visit, they left their team and cart there.

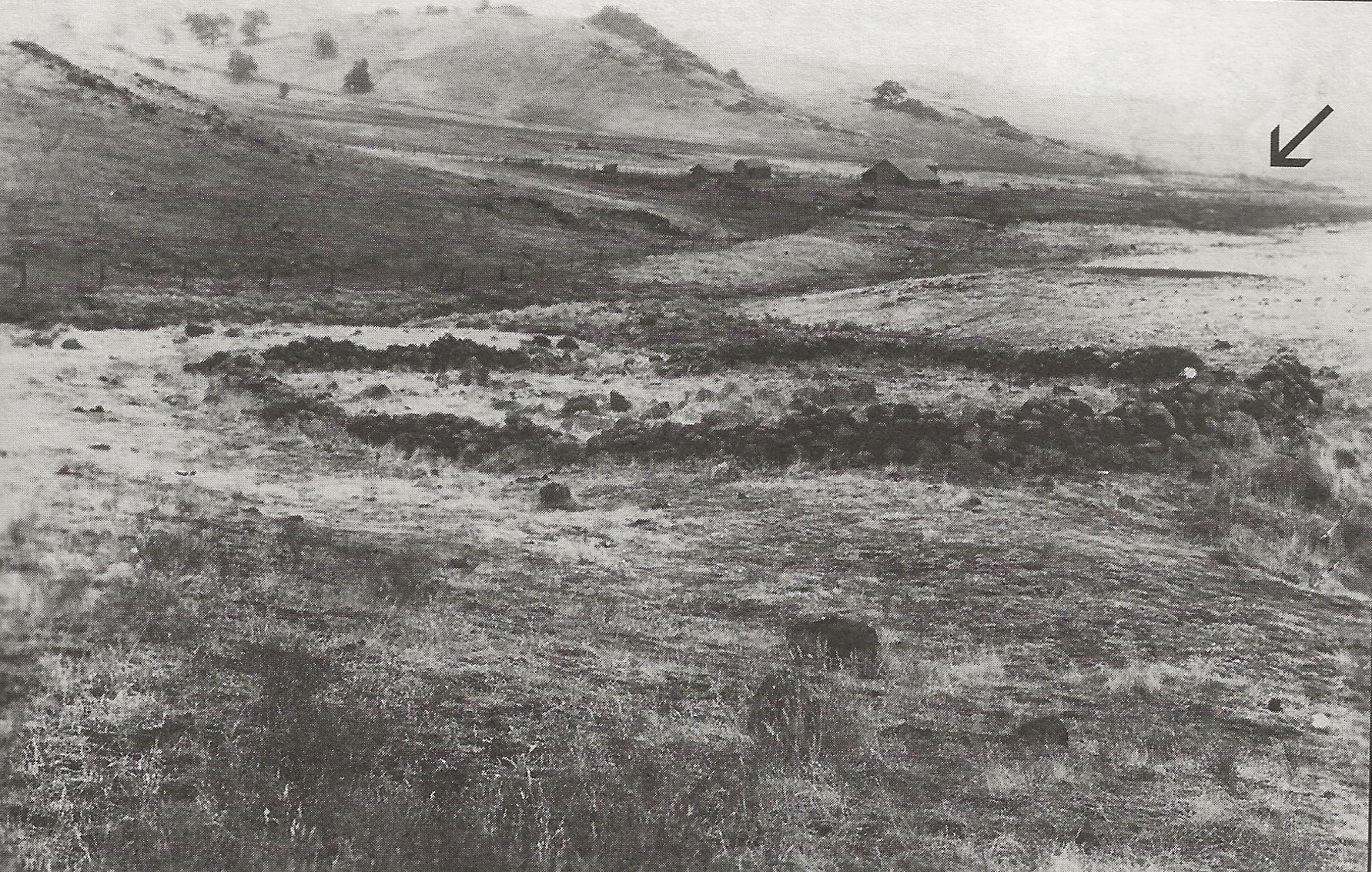
The actual old Stone Corral with the arrow pointing to the area where Evans and Sontag came out of the mountains

After making breakfast, the two went to sleep under an oak tree on a high hill overlooking the surrounding countryside. There they kept watch of the Perkins home until 5PM. Chris proposed that they go to the house after dark, eat dinner, and appropriate their horses. John no longer trusted the Perkins however, and was uneasy about taking their cart since they had been ambushed on it in Visalia. John wanted to walk, but Chris argued that riding would be much easier than walking and that if they were fired upon it would be difficult to get back to camp. Still John insisted on walking, so the pair left immediately in order to make it to Visalia and still have time to sleep before morning.

The two approached Stone Corral Canyon, where they planned to visit a spring before making their way into the valley. They viewed the cabin at Stone Corral with binoculars from the top of the hill. Gard's posse was inside but the horses were tied to the opposite side of the cabin, so the outlaws assumed it was all clear. They carried a shotgun and rifle each and intended to hide two of them in a haystack near the cabin where they could come back for them another night.

Just before sundown, deputy Hiram Rapelje noticed two armed men walking down a hill towards the cabin. He alerted Jackson, who studied the men with a telescope and recognized them as Chris Evans and John Sontag. He then woke up Gard and Burns.

As Evans knelt to bury his gun in the haystack, Rapelje crept out the front door and shot Evans through the shoulder. Chris fired his shotgun, but a bullet hit him in the right eye, destroying his sight, and he fell backwards behind the haystack. The rest of the posse then began firing at the outlaws through the cracks of the cabin. John quickly jumped behind the large pile of straw and attempted to assist Chris. As Sontag returned fire, a bullet struck Evans' wrist and passed out through his elbow. Evans fired his shotgun at the cabin, but blood gushed from his eye, impairing his vision. Jackson decided to try and flank the outlaws by coming around the back of the cabin. As Jackson ran for cover, Evans shot his leg and broke it in two. Chris then told John that he was dying and passed out. John and the posse returned each other's shots for over an hour and over a hundred rounds were fired.

Eventually, Evans awoke and witnessed Sontag get shot in the chest, arm, and face. Sontag quit returning fire, and the posse shot at the straw pile until it was too dark to see. Evans had been shot several times, and both his arms were broken. The bullet that struck Sontag's chest had penetrated his only lung and he told Chris that he was dying. After a while, John asked Chris to kill him and end his misery. Evans refused and desperately tried to get Sontag to leave with him. After John had not responded for a while, Chris began crawling away through the grass and into the darkness. He was then spotted by Hi Rapelje who fired at him. Chris stood up and began to run for the hills armed with only his pistol.

Evans was extremely thirsty from not drinking that entire day. He ran to the nearby spring, but found it to be dry. He could hear the bloodhounds of the posse trailing behind him, so he pushed his way through thick manzanita bushes while blood was gushing from his eye. It was difficult to see and he collided with trees and fell over rocks several times. He even knocked himself unconscious for several minutes, leaving a large pool of blood. He eventually rolled down a hill thick with large manzanitas, and the posse lost his trail.

The posse returned to the cabin and kept eyes on the haystack where they knew one of the outlaws still remained. Rapelje loaded Jackson into a wagon and took him to the hospital in Visalia. Jackson would eventually recover, but his leg would have to be amputated. Marshal Gard and Agent Burns remained at the cabin throughout the night. Rapelje organized a posse in Visalia that consisted of deputies George Witty and Sam Stingley, Visalia City Marshal William English, newspaper reporters Jo P. Carroll and Harry Stuart, and Visalia photographer E. M. Davidson. They quickly made their way to Stone Corral to assist Gard and Burns in apprehending the outlaws.

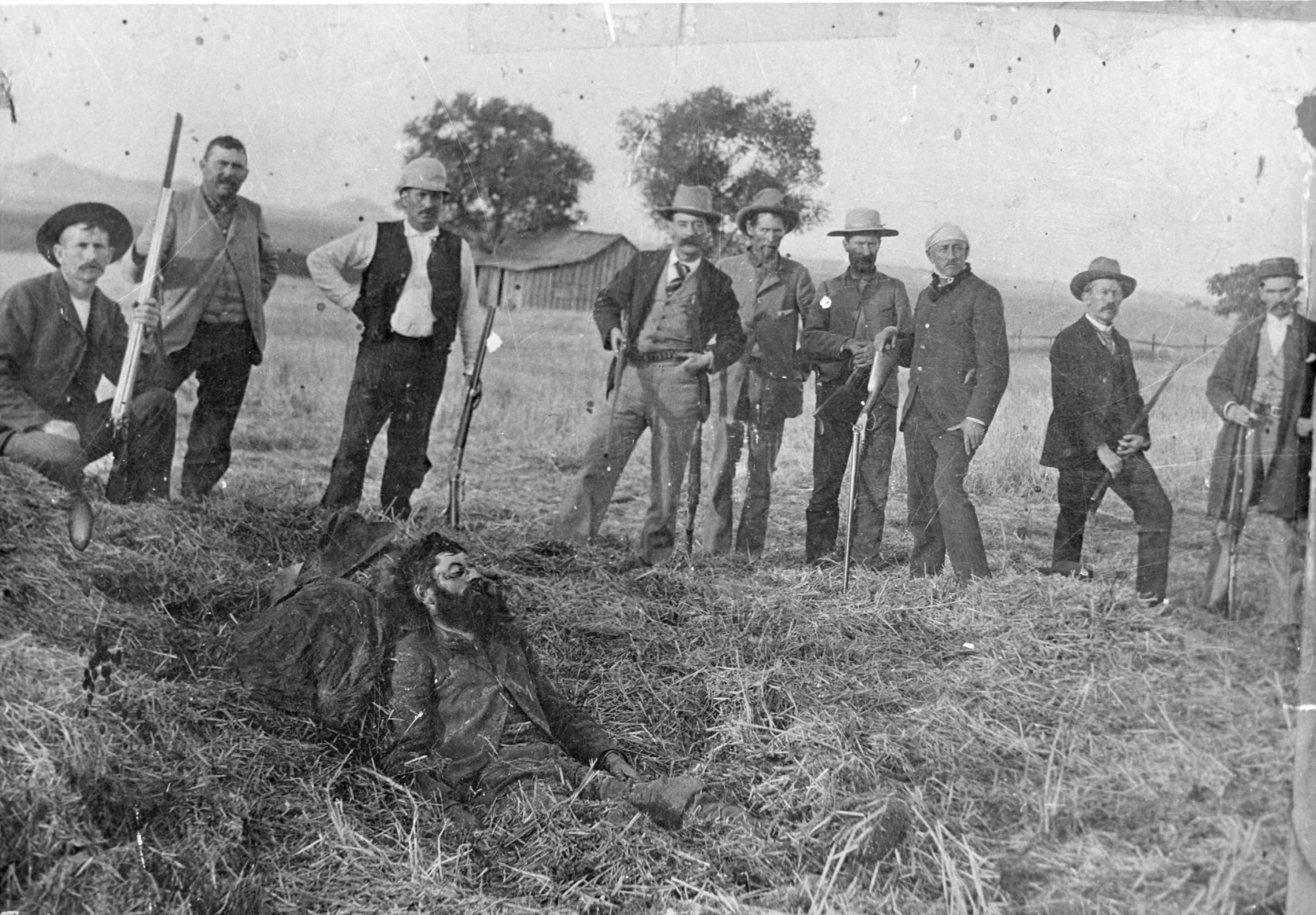
Stone Corral, (left-to-right) Stingley, Rapelje, Hall, Witty, English, Burns, Gard, Carrol, and Stuart. June 11, 1893.

John Sontag laid behind the straw pile throughout the night and at one point attempted to kill himself, but he could not use his arm effectively and he instead blew a hole through his face at the back of his nose. He fell unconscious until morning, when he was found by the posse members nearly frozen. A nearby farmer named Luke Hall, brother of deputy Hall and another former friend of Evans, assisted the lawmen. The posse then temporarily chose to forget their sense of moral decency and posed for a photograph with Sontag, who laid in the pile of manure in anguish. After the photos were taken, John was loaded into a cart and taken to Visalia where he could receive medical attention. They were greeted by a crowd of people who had come to see the famous outlaw, and the lawmen had a tough time getting Sontag to the jail.

After being secured in his cell, Sontag was interviewed by the Visalia Delta and the San Francisco Examiner. He attested that Chris and he were innocent of any train robbery and that the whole thing had been a lie. He stated that Chris had always been sorry for shooting Witty, as he thought it was Smith, and that they never wanted to kill any county officers, only the bank and railroad detectives. Sontag was told that he was dying and had nothing to fear by telling the truth, but he insisted that he had nothing to do with the train robberies. Eventually it became too difficult for him to talk, and his physician told the press he doubted Sontag would live past the following day. After securing Sontag, Rapelje took the same posse and began to search the hills for Evans.

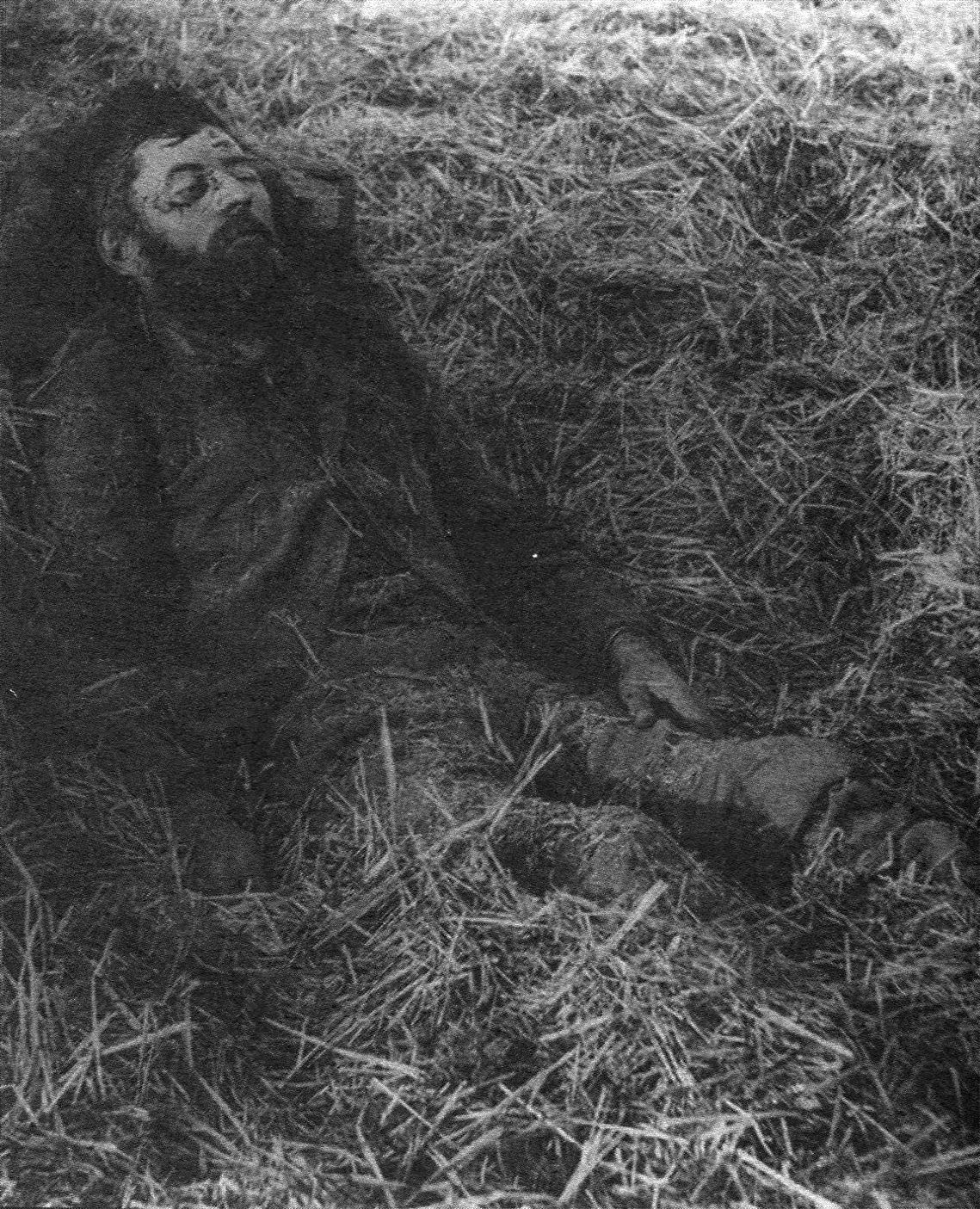
John Sontag, the captured bandit

That same morning, June 12, Elijah Perkins was called on by his mother after she had discovered a large amount of blood on her water pump, with a trail of blood leading up an outside stairway to an attic room. Upon investigating, Elijah discovered Chris Evans lying unconscious on a mattress covered in blood. Evans asked Perkins to dress his wounds and the latter tried to convince him to surrender. Evans refused, telling Perkins he would soon recover and would leave their home when he did. Elijah felt he could gain a portion of the reward money and headed to Visalia to notify lawmen of Chris’ whereabouts. Sheriff Kay was again out of town, and when Perkins arrived in Visalia at nightfall he notified Under-Sheriff William Hall that Evans was wounded at his home. Hall and Perkins then left with a posse for the Perkins house. Word of Evans' location had also reached deputy Rapelje, who then left for the Perkins home with newly appointed Fresno Sheriff Jay Scott and several deputies, hoping to make an arrest.

Hall's posse arrived at the Perkins home at two in the morning and sent Perkins inside, who told Evans to surrender or he would be killed. Evans reluctantly agreed to surrender and gave Hall his pistol which he was keeping under the mattress. When the Fresno posse arrived at the Perkins place, Evans had already been arrested by deputy Hall, and they demanded that the Tulare County posse turn over their prisoner. Hall refused, telling Scott that the Perkins home was in Tulare County and therefore Evans was his prisoner and the reward was theirs. Tensions grew and guns were drawn, but before any fighting could erupt Evans told the men to sort it out later, that he was suffering and needed a doctor.

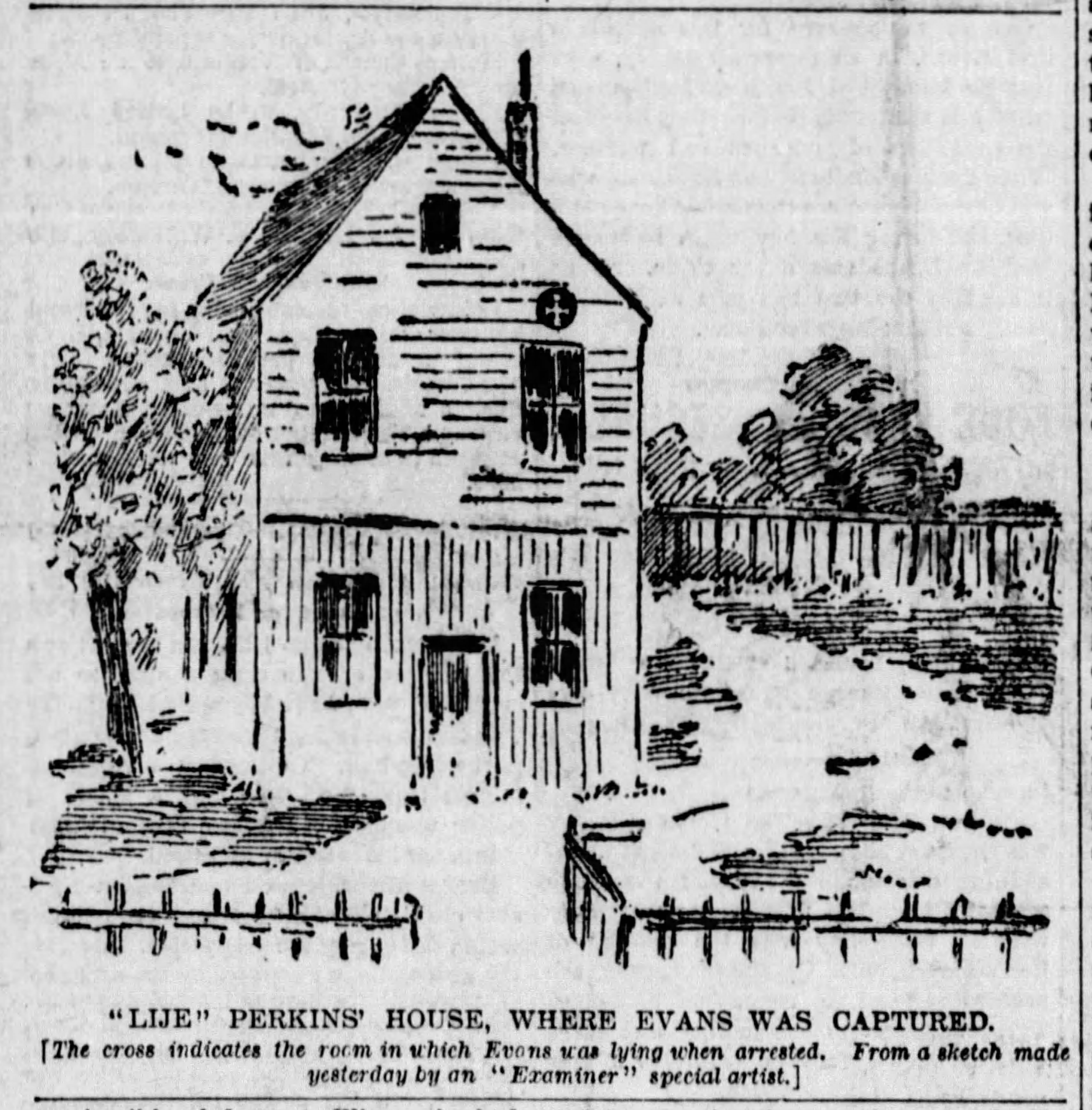
The Perkins home where Evans was captured. San Francisco Examiner, June 14, 1893

When Evans arrived with the lawmen to Visalia it was early in the morning, and most of the townspeople were asleep, but he was still greeted at the jail by a crowd of about fifty people. Molly and Eva Evans were not permitted to see John or Chris until nine that morning. While Molly visited Chris, Eva was allowed to meet with her fiancé.

Later that morning, Tulare Deputy Sheriff's Hall and Witty were having a drink at one of the saloons in Visalia when Fresno Deputy Repalje and Detective John Thacker entered. The lawmen began a tense argument over who would receive the reward money for Evans and Sontag. Witty agreed that the reward for Sontag should go to the Fresno officers, but the men lost their tempers when they debated over who would be compensated for the capture of Chris Evans. Marshal Gard would eventually receive the reward of $5,000 for the capture of John Sontag and divided it amongst his posse members. The issue of the reward money for Evans capture would go on later into the summer, with a complaint being filed in the U.S. Court on July 28. Eventually Gard and Jackson would each receive $1000, Burns and Rapelje would each get $500, and Hall, Witty and Elijah Perkins would split $2000.

Evans was also interviewed by newspaper reporters and told them a similar story as Sontag. He claimed that they were innocent of train robbery and had only killed in self defense. He also held a personal hatred for Will Smith for the way he treated his daughter Eva. On June 14, Evans had his left arm amputated, even though his family claimed that it could have been saved. He also had to have his right eye removed, replaced by a glass made prosthetic, and suffered from an everlasting headache due to a buckshot wound to his skull. The Tulare County Jail in Visalia had a bad reputation for breakouts and, as Evans recovered, it was decided that he and Sontag should be moved to the Fresno jail where they would be more secure.

== Evans and Morrell ==
=== Folsom prison escape ===
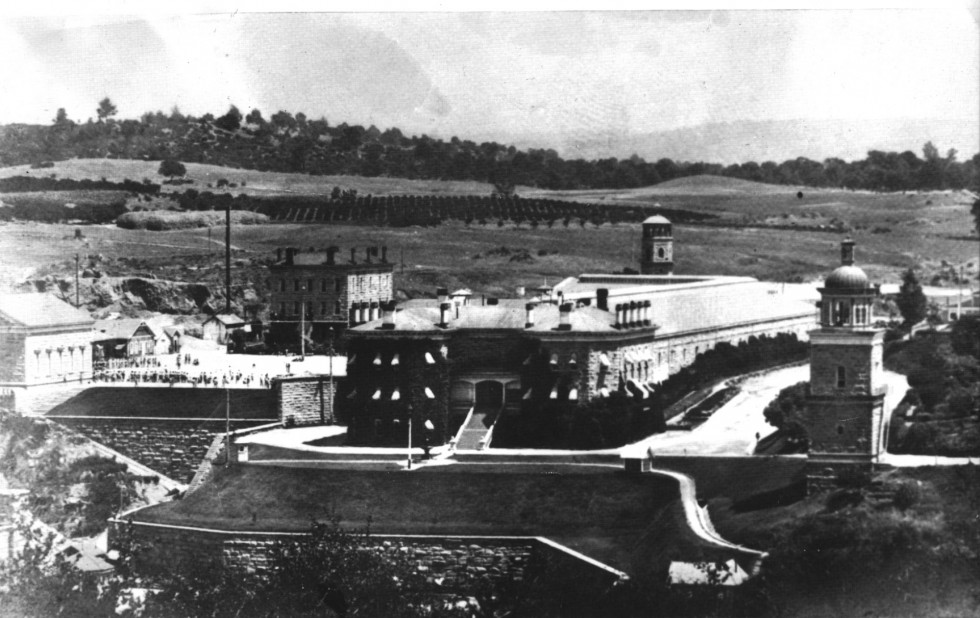
Folsom state prison in 1893

While Chris and John awaited their trial in Fresno, Eva decided to busy herself with assisting George's escape from Folsom Prison. She had received a letter from George written in code that May, telling her to expect and assist a “Mr. Johnson” who would arrive in Visalia in the coming weeks. Later that June, a man came to the Byrd’ home asking for “Mrs. Bolivar”. Eva told Fredericks, under the alias of Johnson, to meet her that evening in the orchard. He told her that George wanted her to gather guns for his escape and that he would have arrived earlier but had been thrown off the train several times after his release. At first she denied the request, but after Fredericks told her how harsh life in prison had been, she agreed to help.

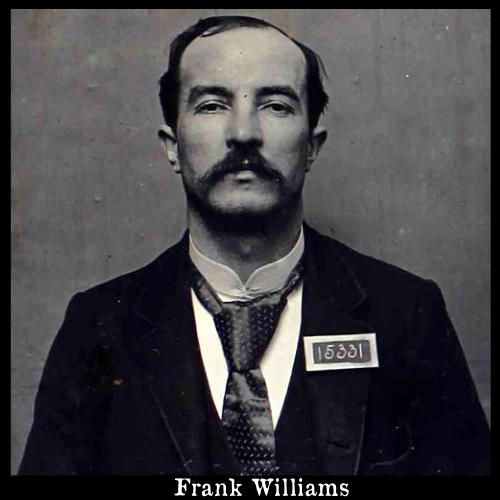
"Smiling" Frank Williams

Eva knew a saloon keeper in Visalia, a friend of her father named Si Lovern. He had previously told Eva that several bounty hunters had pawned their guns for drinks, and that he had stashed the weapons in his saloon. Si Lovern would later be suspected of laundering money for Evans and Sontag. Lovern brought the weapons to Eva, which consisted of two Winchester rifles, three pistols, and a knife, and she hid them in her grandmother's barn. Eva wrapped the weapons in a blanket and gave them to Fredricks, along with $300 and George Witty's revolver, which Eva had acquired after Witty dropped it during the confrontation in Visalia. On June 27, Fredericks had returned to Folsom Prison and was able to successfully hide Lovern's guns in the prison quarry undetected. He then got word to Williams of the gun's location. Fredericks then stowed away on a train east and shot a brakeman who tried to throw him off near Colfax. He again became a wanted man.

By that time, George and Frank Williams had gotten several others involved in their escape plan, including convicts Anthony Dalton (no relation to the Dalton Gang), Hiram Wilson, “Buckshot” Smith, and Charles Abbot. While there were no walls at Folsom Prison, there were several towers positioned on the hills armed with Gatling guns, as well as several men on horseback who patrolled the grounds. Despite the danger, the men assumed that the poorly paid guards would not fight back after seeing the prisoners were armed.

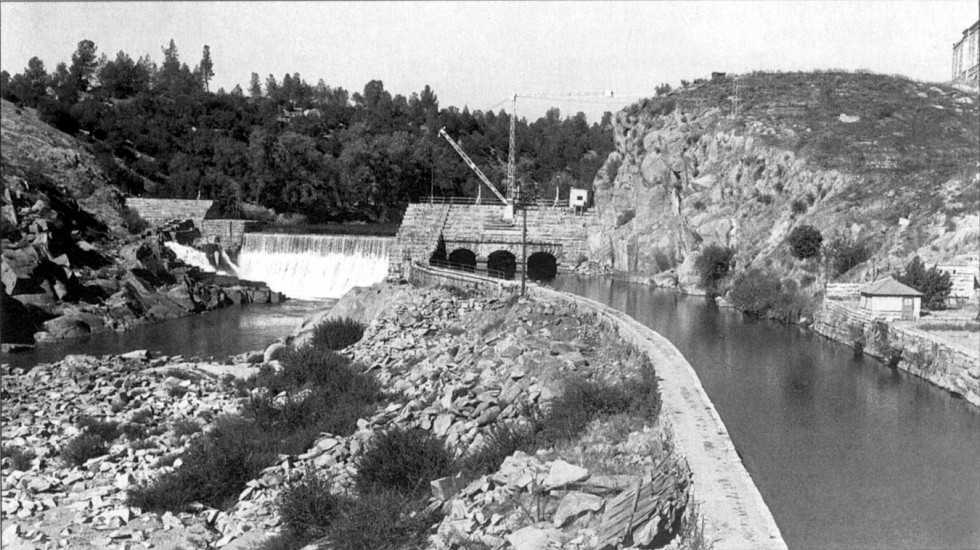
Scene of the 1893 Folsom prison break attempt on the American River

On July 28, 1893, George, his friends, and fifty other convicts were working in the prison quarry. George secured the weapons and, after noticing the guards were distracted, gave the signal to his friends to commence their plan. Hiram Wilsom grabbed a nearby lieutenant named Frank Briare, and held a knife to his heart with the intention of using him as a human shield. Another lieutenant named Lamphrey rushed to the scene but ran into George who aimed a rifle at his face. Another convict realized what was happening and decided to join in the escape. They then forced Lt. Briare up a steep cliff, using him as protection from two guard towers above them. The convicts shot at any guards that came into sight, with George and Williams using the Winchesters. The guards were unable to shoot the convicts as they were packed close together and any shots meant death to the hostage. Lt. Briare suddenly broke free and flung himself over the cliff, taking Smith with him. They both fell down the cliff, exposing the rest of the men to the guards and Gatling guns. After falling 75 feet (23 m), Smith attempted to kill Briare with a hammer but Braire struck him with a rock and knocked him out. The remaining convicts then began taking fire from all directions.

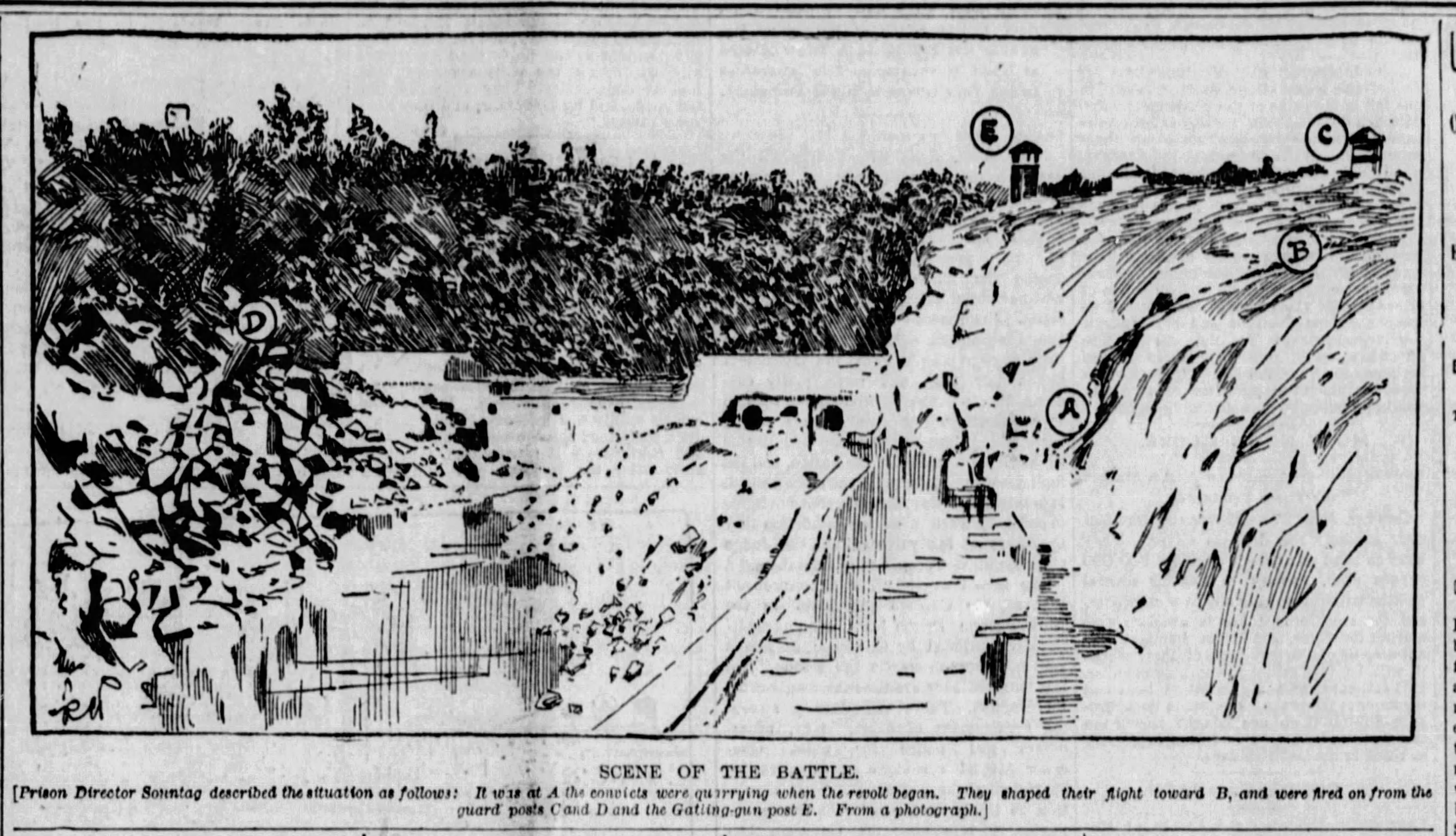
Scene of the 1893 Folsom prison break attempt on the American River. San Francisco Examiner, Wednesday, June 28, 1893.

Warden Aull told the guards to shoot indiscriminately, as they could not risk any convicts escaping into the public. The convicts attempted to take cover behind some rocks in a depression in the cliff, but were pinned down by the oncoming gunfire. Williams was shot in the heart and killed instantly. Dalton attempted to fire at the guards but was shot thirty times by one of the Gatling guns. Wilson was shot twenty-two times, both men died. George attempted to take out the guards in the tower but was shot three times in the thigh and knee. Several other convicts who hid nearby were also wounded but none of the guards were hit. After about forty-five minutes of gunfire, the wounded George Sontag and Charles Abbot threw up a white flag and surrendered. None of the prisoners escaped.

While George recovered from his wounds in the prison hospital, he was visited by his mother and several reporters. Authorities then began searching for William Fredericks, who had last been seen near the Yuba River, east of Marysville.

=== The Evans and Sontag melodrama ===
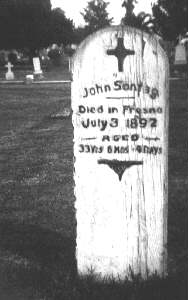
John Sontag's grave in the Calvary Cemetery in Fresno. His date of death is incorrectly marked as 1892.

John Sontag's condition had worsened considerably, as he was dying of peritonitis. Eva made a trip to Fresno where she was permitted to see her fiancé one last time. Sontag's mother was also present, as well as Molly Evans who tried to comfort her. On July 3, 1893, John Sontag succumbed to his wounds and died. He was buried the next day west of Roeding Park, at the Calvary Cemetery in Fresno, not in Mankato as requested by his mother. No mourners were present, but the sky was filled with the sound of fireworks as people in Fresno celebrated the Fourth of July.

On July 11, Molly Evans went to San Francisco to seek legal protection for her husband, but was in desperate need of money. San Francisco in the 1890s supported numerous theaters and at the time was known as an actor's town. During her time in the city, Molly was approached by an actor named Richard C. White, who had the idea of bringing the outlaw's story to the stage. The story of Evans and Sontag had created a media frenzy in the city, but this was not exclusive to newspaper coverage. The famous photograph of John Sontag in front of Marshal Gard's posse had become a popular cabinet card, and the cabin at the Stone Corral had been disassembled shortly after the shootout and put on display in San Francisco for an unrelated melodrama titled, The Train Wreckers, drawing large crowds. White was convinced that a melodrama about Evans and Sontag, starring Molly and Eva themselves, would be extremely popular. Molly was hesitant at first and asked to confer with Chris before making a decision. White sent a letter to Chris through Molly explaining how a quarter of the proceedings of the drama would go toward his court fees. Chris agreed to the idea as long as his cousin, Jim Evans, would get to represent him in a minor role. It is unsure whether Chris knew Eva would be starring in the play.

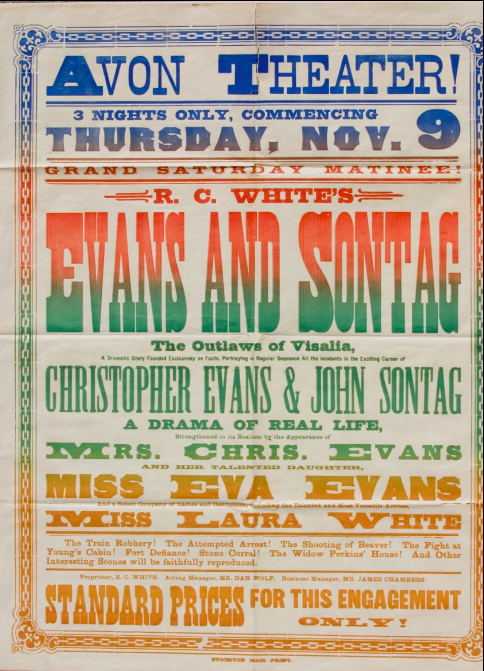
Lithograph poster advertising R.C. Whites, Evans and Sontag, for a performance at the Avon Theater in Stockton

On July 29, 1893, the San Francisco Examiner announced that Molly and Eva Evans would star as themselves in the six act melodrama titled, Evans and Sontag. While Molly worried about her ability to act, Eva was excited to play her role and longed for a career in acting. In September, Molly and Eva traveled to San Francisco where White rented them a flat in the Mission District. The rest of the Evans children went with them, and eventually all seven of them would appear in the production, although they would return to Grandmother Byrd's once the show went on the road.

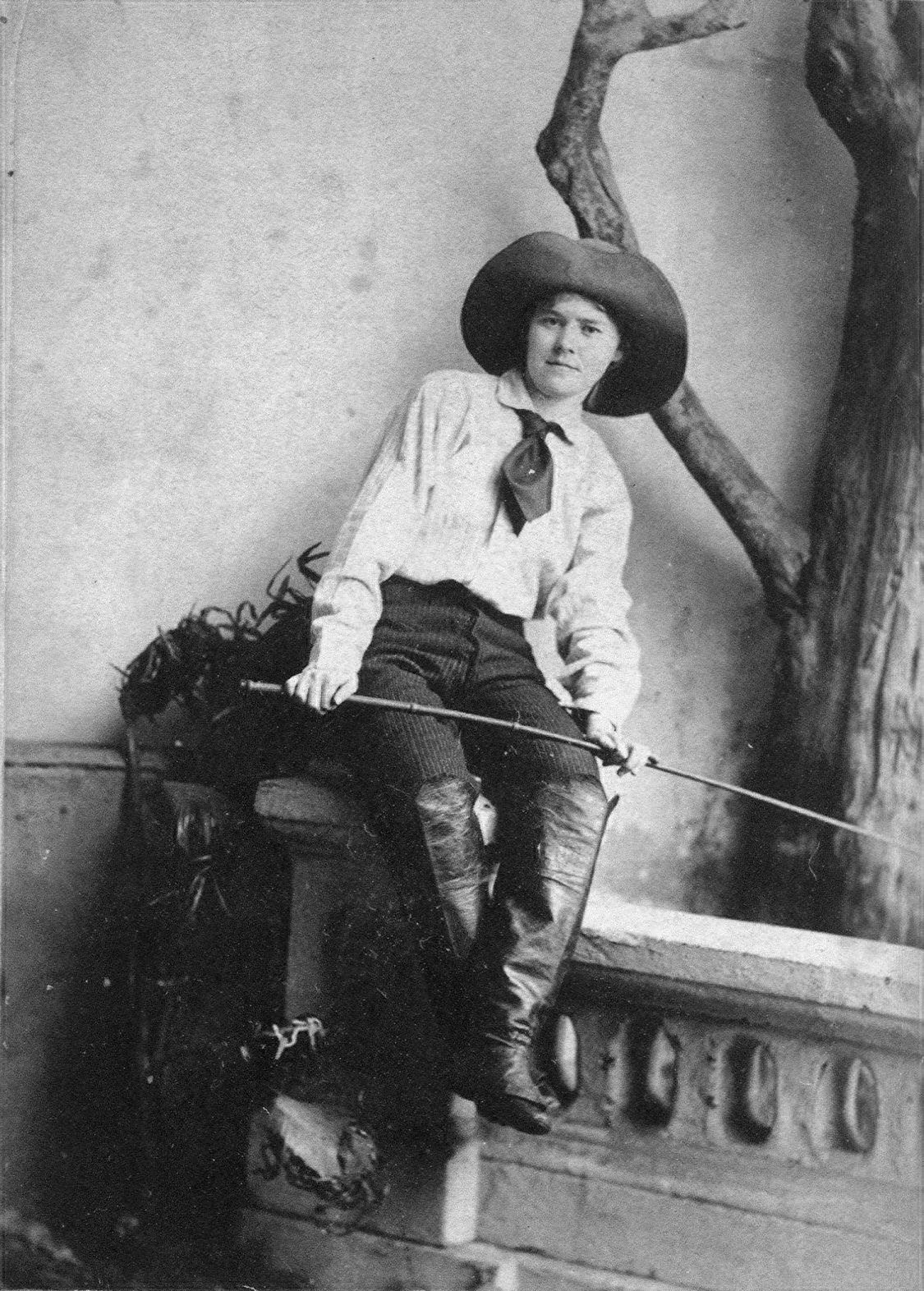
Eva, dressed in boy's pantaloons for the play Evans and Sontag: The Visalia Bandits

The complete cast of characters consisted of Chris Evans, John and George Sontag, Molly and Eva Evans, Mrs. Byrd, Miss Byrd, Mrs. Sontag, Detective Willy Smooth (Will Smith), George and Al Witty, Sheriff Kay, McGinnis, Elijah Perkins, Hall, Burns, O.P. Byrd, Vic Wilson, Frank Burke, Warren Hill, and the Apache trackers Pelon and Cameno.

While the announcement of the play received mostly negative reactions from a variety of newspapers, the San Francisco Examiner heavily marketed the play, and was even accused by the Bakersfield Echo of championing the cause of the outlaws. The story of Evans and Sontag sold newspapers, and Hearst seemed intent on perpetuating the media hype for profit.

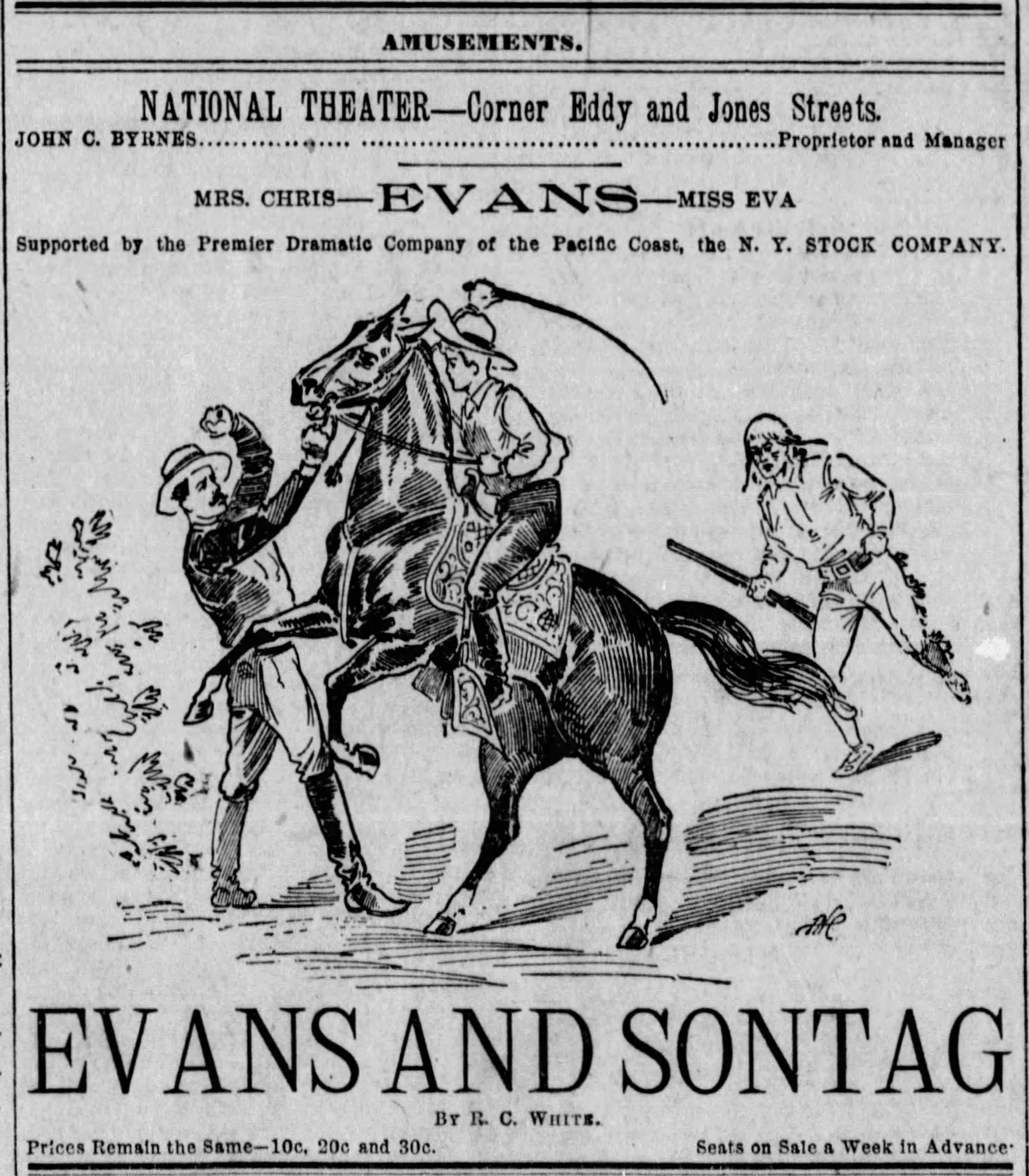
Advertisement for Evans and Sontag in the San Francisco Examiner, 1893

On the night of September 18, 1893, Evans & Sontag premiered at the National Theater in San Francisco, with an attendance well over the theater's 2,200-person capacity. Although it was cheaply produced and mostly consisted of the firing of blanks in shootout scenes, it was very popular. Showings were held in San Francisco for over a month, and it was then performed throughout California, although the performance was not allowed at theaters in Visalia. The play also met significant resistance in Hanford, since the play portrayed Mussel Slough settlers as the Collis train robbers. They still decided to perform in Hanford, although they would use a nearby barn instead of a theater, and they were still able to attract a large audience.

The play portrayed Evans and Sontag as heroes, who were victims of the corrupt Southern Pacific Railroad and the villainous detective Will Smith. Detective Will Smith tried to prevent the appearance of his character, so White renamed him Willy Smooth in order to prove that the character was purely fictitious. The story insinuated that Will Smith was in love with Eva Evans, and that he tried to frame and imprison John Sontag in order to have his way with her. When Eva denounces Smith, he retaliates by burying a sack of stolen coins found at the Collis robbery in the Evans’ backyard. It was in this way that the play set up the argument for Chris Evans' later defense in court. White also attempted to give the play a certain sex appeal, with one particular scene featuring Eva riding her horse across the theater in boys clothes being especially popular. At the time, a woman wearing pants was considered somewhat risqué.

=== George Sontag's confession ===
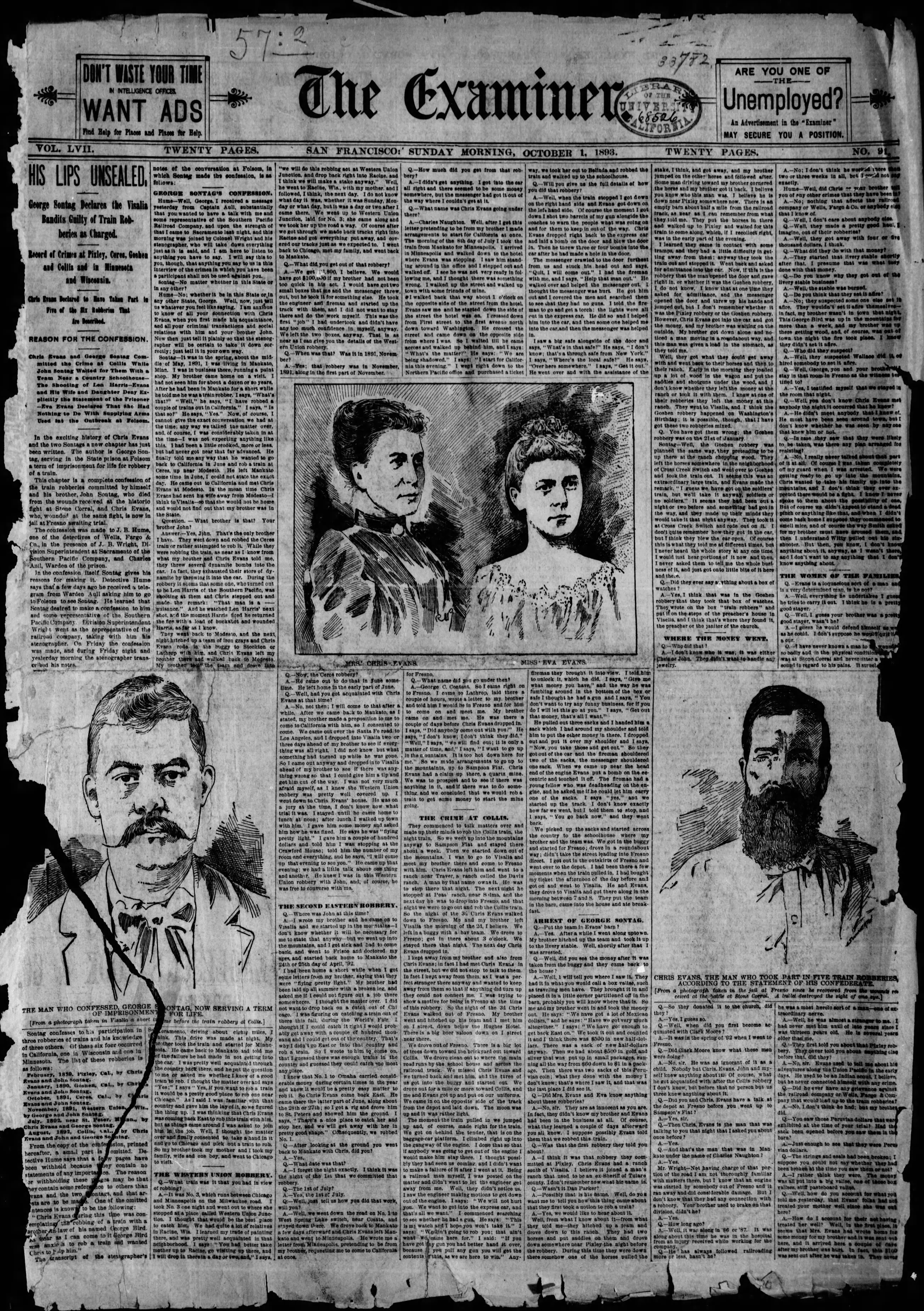
"His Lips Unsealed", San Francisco Examiner, Sunday, October 1, 1893

With the money from the melodrama, Molly Evans was able to secure lawyers to defend her husband. While Chris awaited his trial in the Fresno jail, George Sontag languished with a shattered leg in the Folsom prison hospital. George now viewed his situation as hopeless; he faced a life sentence, his health was poor, his brother was dead, Chris Evans would surely get convicted for the murder of Vic Wilson, and he claimed to have learned that prison directors were planning on sentencing him to five years in solitary confinement upon his release from the hospital.

In late September, after going over his options, George sent for Warden Aull and told him that he was going to confess. He told Aull that he preferred to confess to Wells Fargo Detective James Hume and a representative from the Southern Pacific. He insisted that under no condition would he speak to Detective Will Smith, whom he hated. George felt that if he confessed directly to the companies that had offered rewards for the outlaws, he would be assured favors. He told them that he would confess under the condition that his wife and children be moved to Sacramento from Mankato so they could visit him, that they be provided a furnished house and money for groceries, that he be allowed to visit them for one week each month, and that after a decent interval he would be released with a full pardon. Surprisingly, all these requests would be granted.

George admitted that his decision to confess also had to do with the fact that he held some animosity towards the Evans family. He claimed that they had been rude to his mother upon her arrival in Visalia, refusing to make her acquaintance. George also felt that the Evans family hoped that he would be killed so that there would be no witnesses to prove that Chris was involved in any robberies.

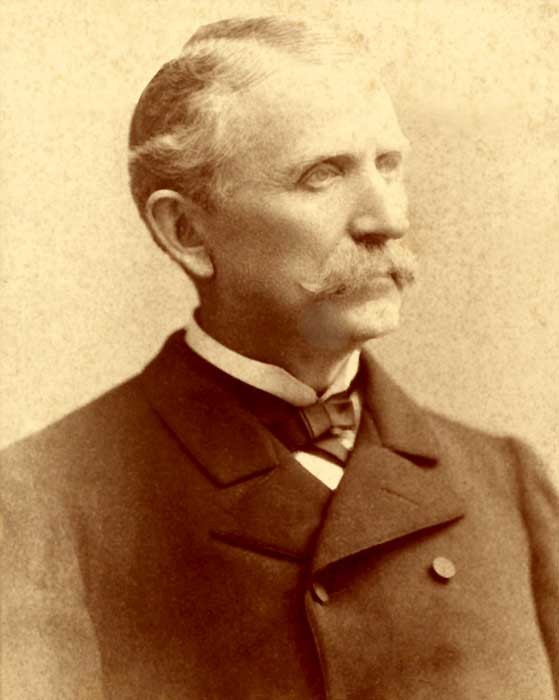
Wells Fargo Detective James B. Hume

The next day, Warden Aull brought in detective Hume, S.P. division superintendent J.B. Wright, and a prison stenographer who took down George's lengthy confession. All together George admitted to taking part in three robberies, as well as having knowledge of three others. The confession was then sent to Governor Markham. George also agreed to stand and testify against Chris Evans in court. He told his story as follows:

In the spring of 1891, George was running a paint shop in Mankato, Minnesota, with the belief that his life was all mapped out ahead of him. One morning, on May 14, George was walking through the Mankato Hotel when he met his brother, John. He had gone West in 1878, and George had heard very little from him in years. John was the older of the two and was the leader in all things. But George was never far behind.

John told George that he had been all over the West, but did not say much else. After he had been home a few days, John went to George's shop, where they could be alone together. After asking a lot of questions, John finally asked George if they could go fishing together at Lake Washington. George agreed, and after they pulled their boat about a quarter mile from shore, John laid back on his seat and watched George work the lines. "Been railroading have you, kid," he began. "So have I, some. But I got hurt awhile back and was laid off. What do you think they told me, when I went to the superintendent's office and asked for some light work until I could get well. They told me they weren't employing cripples. After I had been hurt on their own road too! What do you think of that?"

George told him it looked pretty low down. "It sure did," John retorted, "But I'm getting even". John then went on to tell George what had happened during the last few years since he had been away. Shortly after being laid off by the railroad, John met a man named Chris Evans, who asked him to go to work leveling land. He agreed and went with him to a ranch near Visalia, California. Out there, working together, they talked about John's injury until one day Chris said: "There's just one thing to do---rob a train and get even.”

According to George's testimony, John then told George about how Chris and him had robbed a couple of trains in California. After John had been home for about five weeks, he received a letter from Chris asking him to return to California. He told his family he had to go away and one night disappeared without telling anyone. Ten days later George read in the papers about the Ceres robbery. John returned to Mankato the following week and told George the details of the Ceres robbery and how it had been easily accomplished.

During that fall, when George's paint business got slow, John asked him what he knew about trains carrying money. George had railroaded in the area for twelve years and John knew he had some inside information. George told him there was the No. 3 on the Chicago, Milwaukee & St. Paul and that it carried a big shipment out of Chicago at 11PM every Wednesday night with enough money to retire for life.

John studied George for a moment, then suggested that George go in on the robbery with him, that he would never be able to retire slinging paint. Before agreeing to the arrangement, George told his brother that he had to think it over.

The next day, George decided to accept the offer immediately. The Sontag's had relatives in Chicago they could stay with, and they both felt there would be little danger. George then learned that the No. 3 made a regular stop at Western Union Junction, 8 miles (13 km) south of Racine, Wisconsin, between Chicago and Milwaukee. They moved their headquarters from Chicago to Racine, where they rented a room in a small hotel, intending to come back to it after the robbery. They spent the next day planning their attack and making a number of dynamite bombs.

When the day arrived, the Sontag brothers packed the bombs in a suitcase and started for Western Union Junction. They left Racine about 7:30PM, walking the eight miles south in order to keep anyone from recognizing them. John carried the suitcase and George had their shotguns wrapped in canvas, each had six-shooters under their coats.

When they had gone about 3 miles (4.8 km) from Racine, the first snow of the season began to fall. It made things look bad for them, as their tracks showed them plainly. John and George halted to argue whether to go back or go on. Then, since the ground was very wet, they decided the snow would soon disappear. They went on and arrived at Western Union Junction around 10:30PM. This gave them half an hour before No. 3 was due.

The robbery at Western Union Junction occurred at about one o’clock in the morning on November 12, 1891.

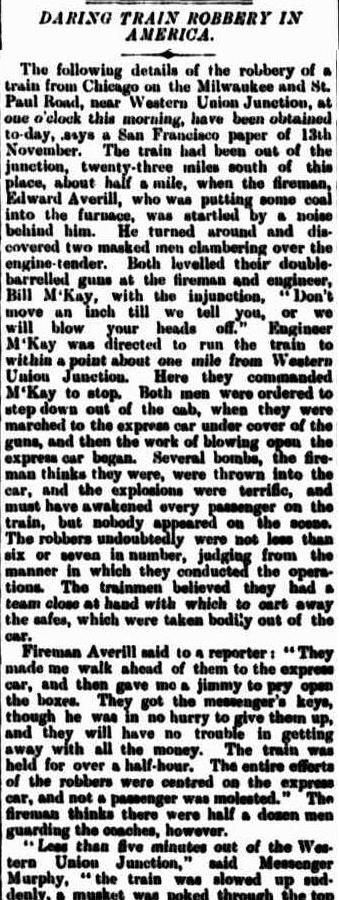
Article on the Racine train robbery, Daily Bulletin, Rockhampton, Queensland, Australia, Friday 15 January 1892, page 6

George decided that a good place to stop the train was at a wagon road, three quarters of a mile from the station. They hid under a platform, both wearing masks, and holding buckshot in their mouths to disguise their voices. When they noticed No. 3 pounding along the rail towards them, they unwrapped each coat pocket and stood ready. When it stopped, the two boarded, John getting up with the engineer and fireman, while George got onto the blind baggage.

After covering the crew, John had the fireman light the cigars. Then he looked out of the cab and, seeing a fence at the wagon crossing, ordered the engineer to stop. This was at the first, instead of the second crossing, which George had picked out. Unaware of the mistake, John took the engineer and fireman and got down on the right-hand side, the moment the train stopped. In the same instant, George jumped back to blow the express car.

Going on the run, George fired a charge of buckshot along the train to keep the passengers, or anyone else, from sticking their heads out, then reached the express car and laid a 3-pound (1.4 kg) bomb on the doorsill. George ducked out of danger beneath the car, and the bomb exploded, blowing the door in. George's call to the messenger brought no response, so he lit a 4-pound (1.8 kg) bomb and threw it in a window. This time the messenger knew it was time to surrender and came out with his hands up.

According to George's testimony, upon entering the express car it occurred to him that there might be two messengers in the car due to the amount of valuable cargo present. When the first messenger came up to him, he yelled, "Tell your partner to come out! What do you think you're doing?" The messenger then turned back, "Come on Fred," he called, "they know you're in there."

After the partner came out, George told John to bring the engineer to the side of the train and to keep watch while he searched the messengers. After finding them unarmed he ordered them to unlock the safe. The messenger made the excuse that the explosion had caused him to lose his keys. George cocked the hammer of his gun and told him he had two seconds to find them. After the messenger unlocked the safe, he began taking out the packages of money himself when George pushed him out of the way and put what he thought most valuable into a sack bag.

Just as George was getting ready to leave, he noticed a smaller safe covered in debris. After ordering the messenger to open it, he replied that it had a time lock. After George saw he was telling the truth, he had the messenger throw the safe out of the car. He then jumped out with the messenger, expecting to blow open the smaller safe. However this had taken too much time and John told him that they'd been there too long. Still, George was eager to open the safe and replied, “Wait till I blow this. It has all the money.” John called out again from the front of the train, “Here comes the special train from Racine!”

George stepped out from the train, looked back, and saw three men crawling around the end car. George and John fired their shotguns and the men retreated. Then, herding the train crew ahead of them, George and John started down the track running until they came within a short distance of the crossroad. So far, there was no sign of pursuit, so they stopped, told the men to go back, and advised the engineer to go back "dark".

The moment the train vanished, the two started diagonally from the track across to the wagon road, leaving two plain paths in that direction. Upon reaching the road, they walked a hundred yards in the snow, deliberately making marks which could be followed. Abruptly they stepped into the ruts, where soft mud had melted the snow, and began to backtrack.

They then came to the railroad again, arriving there after the train had pulled out. Yet there still seemed no way of getting onto the ties without leaving their prints, until they saw a chance by the old rail fence. The two got onto the bottom plank and walked sideways on it for three quarters of a mile. At the second crossroad, they were able to get onto the ends of the ties where they could leave no marks.

Heading back toward Racine, George and John barely escaped discovery as a train with a single coached filled with armed men thundered past.

They ran most of the way to a deserted house outside of Racine Junction. They went down in the cellar, took their guns apart, and wrapped them in canvas. They then walked directly into town and made their way to their hotel room. Since it was a small place, there was no desk clerk to see the mud on their shoes, and up in the room they set to work at once cleaning off suspicious marks. Neither of them stopped until they were free from mud and could rest easily in their chairs before a little wood stove. Then they counted their hand. George's bag held $10,000 in "greenbacks". Satisfied, the two went to sleep, waking up in the morning to hear newsboys outside crying: "Big train robbery! Milwaukee No. 3 robbed last night!"

John told George to buy a paper, and they learned the good news that a posse had found the robbers’ tracks in the snow and had followed them down a crossroad. Soon, the paper said, they would have the men captured. All seemed well.

The Sontag brothers split their pile in the room, agreed to meet at home later and took different ways out of town. In a few days John joined George at his home in Mankato and suggested that they go out to California, "just to look around." George agreed, and the two made the trip West, mainly to meet Chris Evans.

In December 1891, John brought George to California to meet Chris Evans. George was not impressed with Evans like his brother however, and described him as, “a somewhat religious man of medium build with reddish hair and slow movements, who looked more like a farmer than a train robber.” Evans filed a mining claim that February, but according to George the three did little mining. Instead they went into the Sierra Nevada mountains in search of potential places of concealment, where they felt comfortable they could hide out for months at a time if needed. George's trip was cut short when John broke his leg during an accident with a runaway team. George had also received a letter notifying him that his wife had delivered a baby, so he bought a train ticket home. During his trip to California, George brought up to Evans the idea of robbing a train back in Minnesota where George knew the country well. That June, Chris sent a letter to George telling him he was coming to Minnesota alone and to prepare for a “hunt”.

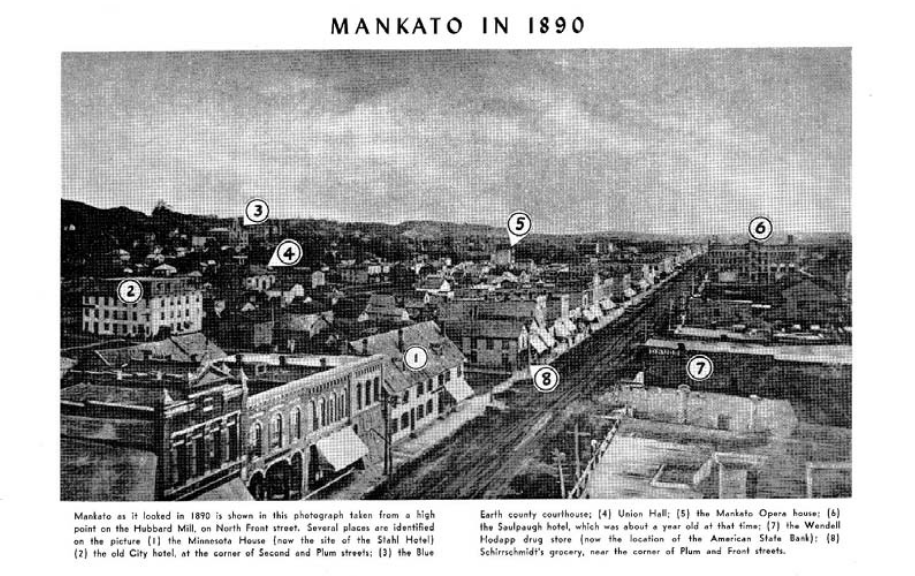
Mankato, Minnesota, in 1890. The Sontag Hotel was located at 401 N. Riverfront Drive.

On June 28, Chris arrived in Mankato under an assumed name, Charles Naughton, and booked a room at the Sontag hotel. George already had a whole robbery planned and after discussing it further they both decided to rob the "Omaha" on the night of July 1. George explained how he had begun to mistrust Chris from the beginning, but because his brother had a deep respect for him, he went about the robbery as if John were there.

As usual, they reached the scene a day ahead of time, looked over the ground carefully and came to the conclusion to rob the train in between St. Peter and Kasota. The next afternoon, they rode some distance from town, hid their horses close to the tracks, and returned to St. Peter in time to board the No. 1 as it pulled out.

They stopped the train in the usual manner, with the engineer and fireman covered. It was raining hard this night, making everything along the track very dark and uncertain. After coming to a stop, Chris and George planned to use dynamite on the express door, but it became unnecessary when they caught the messenger with the door open. Chris told George to watch the engine crew while he went in to search the car.

Like usual, the train crew was then marched down the tracks and after a safe distance was ordered to go back to the train. The two grabbed their horses and rode off. However, when George drew close to Chris and asked him what the loot was, Chris explained that the messenger had told him there was no money. George swore that the messenger must have lied, but before he could turn around the engine headlight flashed on and the train started back toward St. Peter. They were forced to leave empty handed and George was left believing that Chris had swindled him.

"To this minute, I don't know the truth of that deal," said George. "In the light of later events I would not hesitate to say that I was a young fool, innocent in the game, and let an older hand stall me out of my share in the haul. I had to learn that a thief will steal from a thief and that this was a hard, grim business in which no favor was asked nor given."

After the robbery a letter from John convinced George to join him again in California. Not trying to be seen in Mankato, Chris went to Minneapolis, where he planned to meet George on their way West. George reached Minneapolis on July 10 and started for the hotel where he agreed to meet Evans. "Something made me cautious, and I did not go directly to the spot. Chris didn't give me a feeling of confidence now. He was careless, it seemed."

George left his suitcase at the Union Depot and walked to the hotel. When he entered the lobby, he saw three men standing in conversation with Chris. George could tell that he was answering questions. Playing it cool, George went up to the desk and bought a cigar before leaving the hotel.

George believed the three men to be officers, so he walked back to Briggs Square, crossed to the opposite side of the street, and came back. Upon turning back, he saw Chris come out and sit down in a chair arranged near the sidewalk. At once the three men followed and also took chairs. George continued past them on the far side of the street.

By the time he reached the next corner, Chris had noticed George and moved to approach him. George quickly wrote on a piece of paper: "Am leaving for Fresno tonight. Meet me there." and put it on the window ledge of a store unnoticed before walking on. Chris found the note and that night George caught the Northern Pacific for the coast.

George was certain that he had not been a suspect of either of the past years' train robberies, but after spending two hours in Portland switching cars, he began to suspect that he was being shadowed. While sitting in a hotel lobby talking to the conductor who had brought him to Portland, George noticed what he thought to be another "plainclothes man" standing near the front desk. He asked the conductor quietly if he knew who the man was and if he worked for the Northern Pacific. The conductor told George the man was in fact a detective. George kept an eye on him until his seven o’clock train for California, but when he went aboard he discovered that the man did not follow. After arriving in Fresno, he was sure he had not been followed, but believed the man had wired ahead.

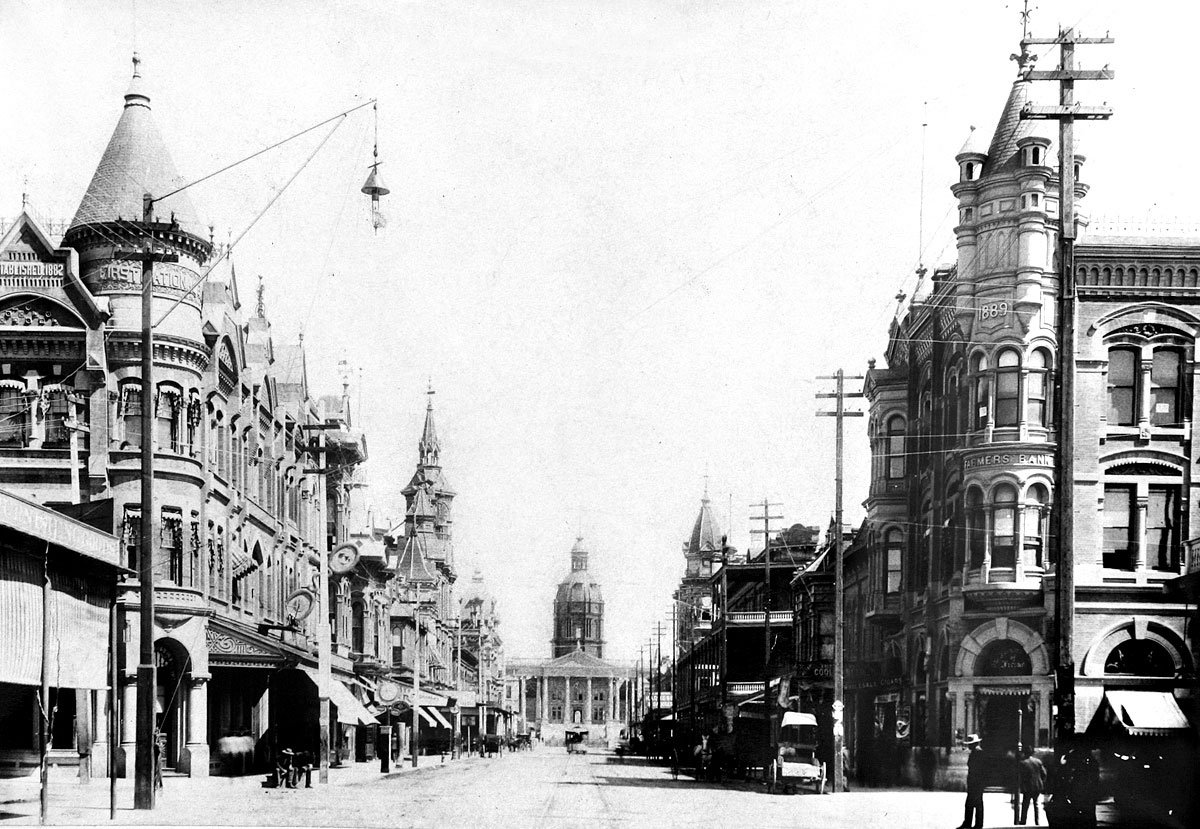
Mariposa and I (later Broadway) streets in Fresno in 1890. Most of the buildings in view had been built only a year prior.

George liked Fresno's location; it was close to his brother in Visalia, as well as Chris Evans’ mountain retreats. Upon arriving, George immediately craved a beer from the J Street Palm Garden, where he could escape from the hot summer day. George had written to John to meet him in Fresno, but he began to wonder where Chris had gone, as he had not seen or heard from him since Minneapolis.

George kept watch of the train station waiting for his brother to show up but also kept his eyes on the streets for any detectives. That night, George was walking by a livery stable when a man stepped out from the dark and said, “Hello, kid. Come in here.”

John laughed after he saw that he had surprised George, then explained that he had driven a team he rented from Visalia, instead of taking a train in case of any problems. George told John how he thought he was being followed by detectives, and how he had seen Chris talking to the three men in Minneapolis but had not heard from him since. He then told John about the failed Kasota robbery and how he distrusted Evans, believing him to have withheld money. John became agitated and accused George of having "cold feet".

"I could see," George said, "that he trusted Evans more than he did me." George wanted to prove himself to his brother and show him that he was game. He then brought the conversation back to the man he believed to be following him. John assured George that the railroad "dicks" had probably given up on trailing him, and that he had a good job planned out. George asked him whether he would even be able to commit a robbery considering his leg had still not fully healed from the team accident a few months before. John suggested that George and Chris rob the train while he waited close by with a team of horses for their escape. After talking for more than an hour in the doorway of the livery stable, they noticed a train pull into the station. They then happened to notice Chris exit the rear coach of the train, and they sent a boy to bring him to the barn.

After the three were reunited in the back room of the barn, they began to go over their next robbery. "John has something good," George told Chris, "but I am afraid you may have drawn some dicks on your trail." Chris told them that if he had been followed, they quit at San Francisco. George then became irritated and asked Chris "what kind of play he had made" to put the detectives on their trail in Minneapolis. Chris denied that he had made any sort of play, and from this point on the two's relationship would be strained. George claimed that, no matter how friendly Chris was to John, "his relations towards me would not be so warm that I could go without an overcoat."

John believed that he had a good plan devised to strike the Southern Pacific with a high chance of making a good sum, but they would have to move on the job immediately. George and Chris agreed that because of the failure of the past job, they needed to strike soon. George and Chris then planned to meet in the mountains at Dunlap, while John went to Visalia to secure weapons and explosives.

George and Chris then robbed the Collis train in August 1892, while John waited nearby with a team of horses.

George then told the men the details of his failed escape plan from Folsom and how Eva had helped furnish him weapons. His confession was so lengthy that the stenographer had to stop him several times to rest his hands. When he finished, he was promised his confession would not be used against him.

When the news of George's confession was received, an Examiner correspondent at the Visalia jail told Chris that Sontag had confessed to several robberies. "Bully for him." he replied, eager to hear the story. He was then told that George had implicated him in the robberies. "Who says so?" he asked. He was then told the news had been telegraphed from San Francisco. "Just say for me, that Sontag or any other man who says I ever robbed any train tells a lie from beginning to end. Besides, Sontag never made any such statements." He then asked to see the telegram and he read it over several times. Chris Evans laughed several times, "I can prove by dozens of men that I was not near these train robberies. I was at home. In no way could I get there, without flying, and I'm not an angel." "This thing is a julep. You may say to the Examiner that I have nothing to confess. This story is made out of whole cloth by the railroad people, who are using every effort to prejudice people against me. They have subsidized the press and are now using every effort to shut down the doors of the theaters in Fresno and Visalia on the 'Evans and Sontag' drama. Well, they're welcome to the job. Pixley, Goshen, Ceres, and Collis, that's four of them. Why don't they scratch up a few more! I wonder what will be the next move they make. I shouldn't wonder if they will have a dozen men up trees around Jim Young's cabin as witness to that fight."

Evans' mood changed rapidly during the interview; while laughing and careless he would then flare up angrily over what he called persecution. When it was suggested that possibly George Sontag's friendship toward's him had changed, Evans said he knew nothing of that matter. He believed Detective Hume must've schemed to get George to confess anything if it meant his freedom. When Molly and Eva were interviewed, they commented that they felt pity for George that he had gotten so low to where he felt he needed to lie in order to secure a pardon. Eva also denied that she wrote George letters or supplied him with weapons, even though she would later admit to it many years later in her memoir.

=== Chris Evans' trial ===
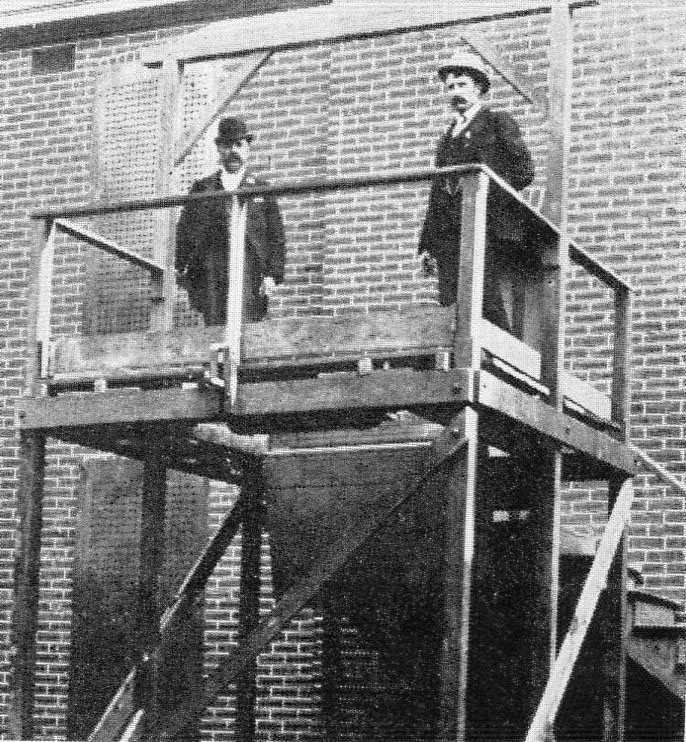
Gallows on which Dr. F. O. Vincent was hanged for wife-murder in 1893, the only person legally executed in Fresno County. Sheriff Jay Scott is shown at left.

On October 19, Fresno Sheriff Jay Scott received a telegram from an informant in Visalia, warning him that Chris Evans was planning to escape from the county jail with the help of several friends. He was also warned to keep watch of Molly and Eva. Scott decided to move Evans to an upper part of the jail, with steel cells, where he would be more secure. Evans was not given a reason for the move and afterwards refused to see any visitors. A week later, a crowd of four thousand men, women, and children would gather outside Chris' cell to witness the hanging of convicted wife-murderer Dr. F. O. Vincent, the first legal hanging in Fresno County. Evans now faced the serious possibility of sharing the same fate.

On November 20, 1893, Judge M.K. Harris opened the case of The People of the State of California v. Christopher Evans, in the Fresno County Courthouse. Due to the amount of acquaintances Evans had, as well as the widespread media coverage, it took nine days to select an unbiased jury and three hundred names were called before twelve jurors could be selected.

On November 29, Chris Evans was brought into the crowded courtroom wearing “smoked” glasses. He was accompanied by deputy Hi Rapelji and, even though the deputy had shot Chris months prior, the two seemed to be getting along well. Many had come expecting to get a view of a ferocious outlaw. Evans however was missing one arm and an eye, and was pale from his illness. Many were instead left feeling pity. Also present in the courtroom was Molly Evans, as well as the widow of Vic Wilson, dressed in all black, with her three-year-old son.

Evans was represented by State Senator G.G. Goucher, and attorneys S.J. Hinds and T.S. O’Donnell. The prosecution team included Attorney W.D. Tupper and Alva Snow, future mayor of Fresno. Most of Evans' trial was basically a repetition of George's trial the year before. Even though he was being tried for murder, the first several testimonies were from witnesses of the Collis train robbery. The prosecution attempted to prove that Evans was guilty of train robbery in order to show that the killing of Beaver, Wilson, and McGinnis was inexcusable. On the other hand, if the defense could prove that Evans was innocent of train robbery, they could maintain he only killed in self defense.

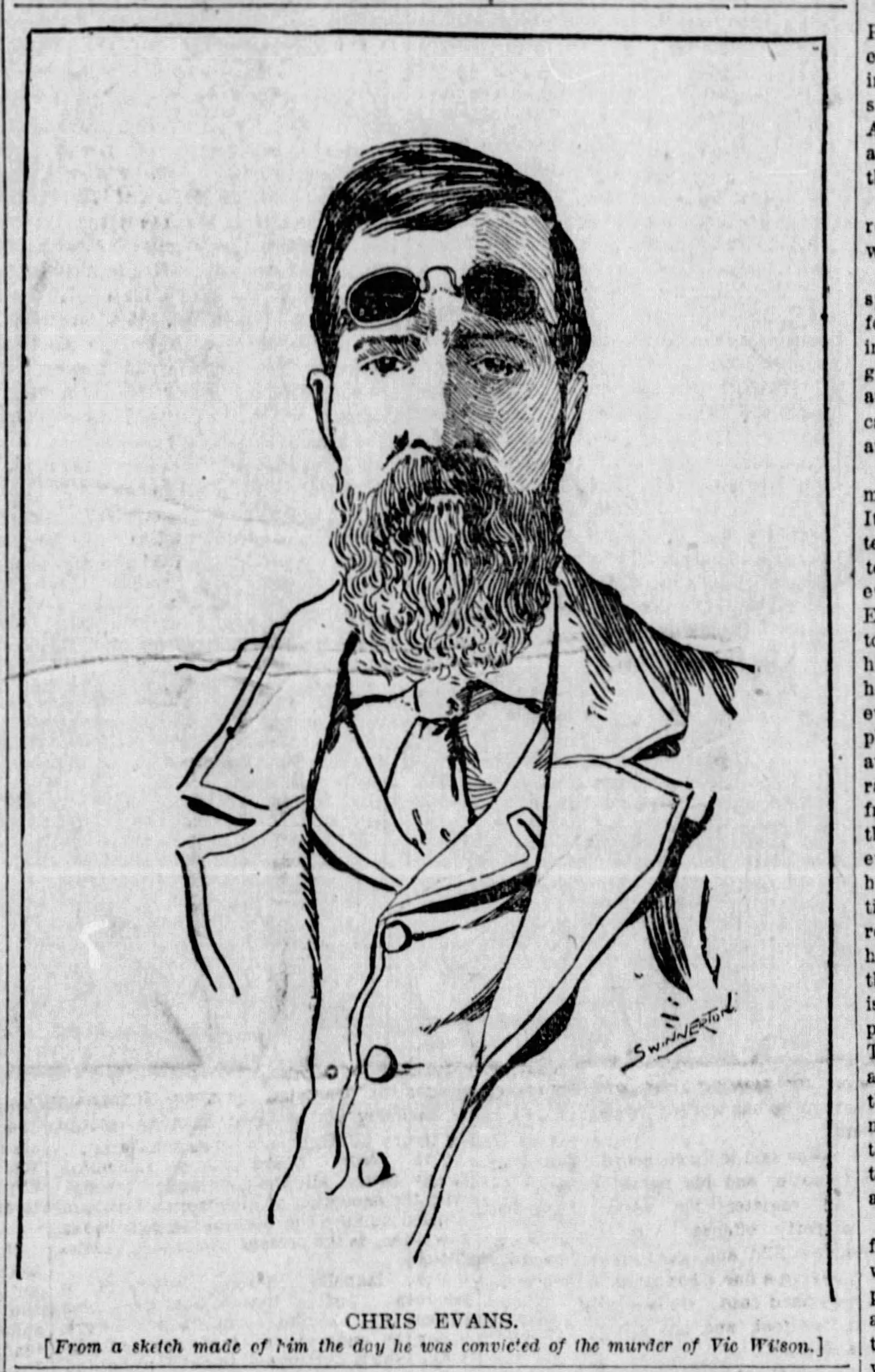
Chris Evans, as he appeared at his trial. San Francisco Examiner, Friday, December 29, 1893.

While the defense objected, Judge Harris stated that, while two crimes could not be tried at the same time, the prosecution could not be restricted from trying to establish a motive for a crime by presenting evidence of another crime. The defense was overruled and the first witnesses were called to the stand.

The prosecution again called Wells Fargo detectives Thacker and Hume, who presented the sacks of Peruvian coins found at the Evans home. Most of the witnesses from George's trial were also called to the stand.

Sanger Constable Warren Hill showed up at the beginning of the trial with two large revolvers strapped to his belt. This created such attention among the jury that the defense protested, arguing that Hill's parading around was giving the jury the false impression that Evans would try to escape. Judge Harris agreed and ordered Hill to disarm.

A few witnesses, who had known Evans since his arrival in Visalia in the 1870s, were asked by Tupper if he had ever had any conflicts in the past, but the defense objected. While the facts of these fights were not allowed to be brought up in court, several reporters released their own findings. One story was reported on that took place in January 1871, when Evans was in business with a man named Thomas Love. One day Love got into a heated argument with a man named Newt Demasters over rent due on a pasture. De Masters lost his temper and shot Love with his revolver. He then fired at Chris, but missed. Chris then ran inside his house and grabbed his rifle, but by the time he returned a large crowd had gathered at the scene, which prevented the situation from escalating further. There were no reports of any arrests made.

Another story was touched on that took place in the fall of 1875, while Evans was working at the Hyde Mill. One day, shortly after his first sons death, Chris discovered a note on the fence of the corral where he kept his horses. It was undoubtedly left for him to discover and was a nasty poem, or doggerel, written about his wife. It implied that she had gotten pregnant before they were married, since the baby had been born only eight months after their wedding day. One verse read, “Molly, who belonged to the tribe of Byrd, had left to roam with another herd.” Evans was furious. He had reason to believe the perpetrator was an older man named A.D. Bigelow, who had recently left the mill with a man named Hunter. On November 6, Chris Evans, his brother Tom Evans, and Molly's brother, Louis Byrd, met up with Bigelow on the Badger road. Chris then proceeded to beat Bigelow nearly to death with a piece of iron while Tom and Louis held Hunter at gunpoint.

Soon enough, a deputy sheriff came looking for Louis Byrd and the Evans boys. Tom surrendered himself without trouble, but Chris and Louis fled into the mountains. Chris had reportedly said that no one would take him, but Molly's father Jesse Byrd convinced the two to turn themselves in by telling them that he would pay the fine. They both turned themselves in early that December and, by the end of that month, all three stood trial. Tom and Louis were found not guilty, but Chris was found guilty of assault and battery. Chris was subject to either pay a hundred dollar fine or spend a hundred days in jail. Jesse Byrd paid the fine, and Chris tried to leave the incident in the past. A few months later however, Bigelow died. Some said he never recovered from the beating he received from Evans.

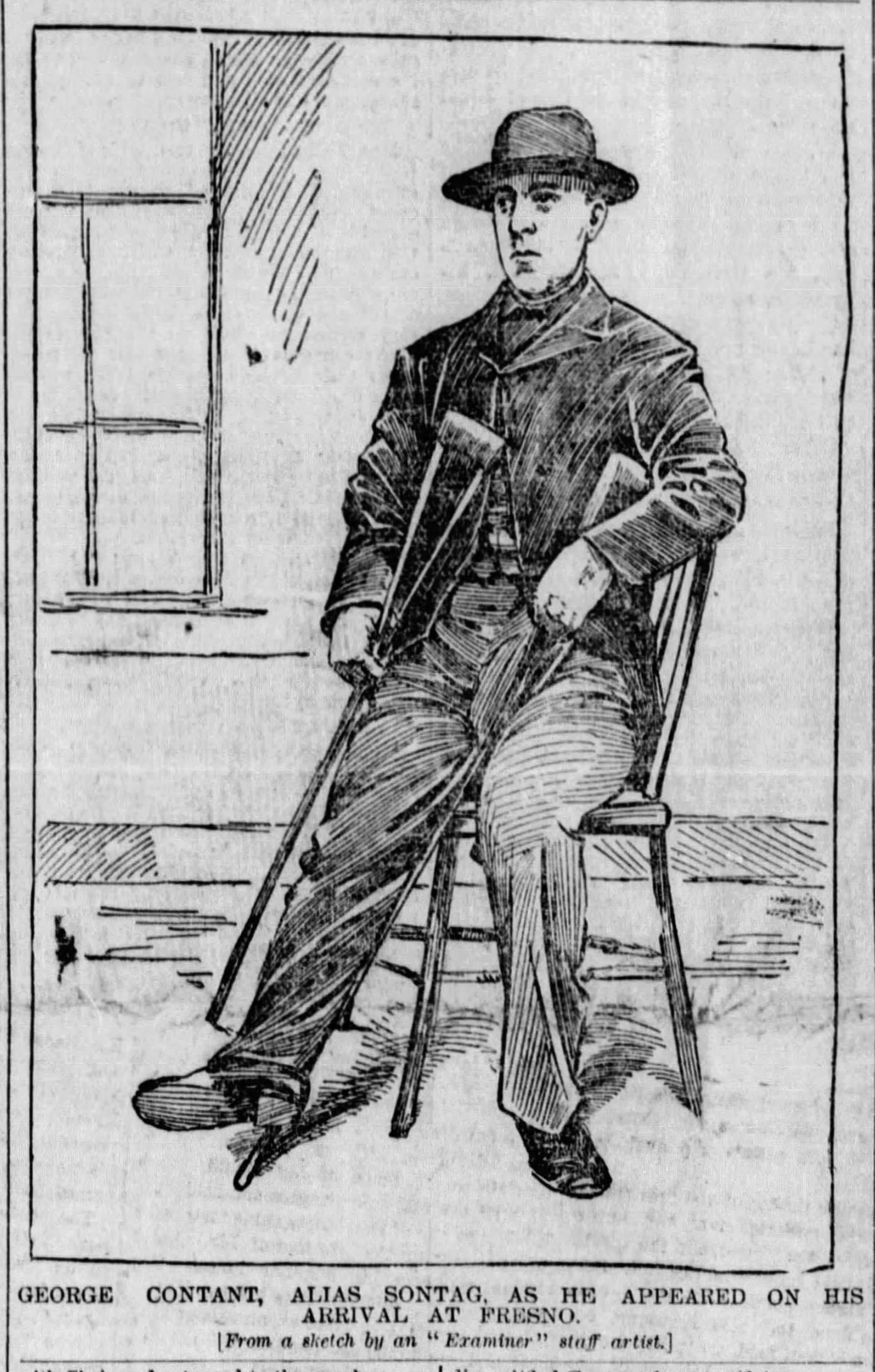
George Contant, as he appeared at Chris Evans' trial. San Francisco Examiner, Saturday, December 2, 1893.

On December 2, the prosecution surprised the court when they called in George Sontag, who had been secretly brought down from Folsom by train the night before. Evans became visibly angry and kept up a long hard stare. George did not seem to notice him and hobbled on crutches to the witness stand, giving a more complete story than his original confession. George described Evans during the Collis robbery as wearing overalls, a slouch hat, and a linen duster and said that they had used two shotguns, three revolvers, and six dynamite bombs. When the defense took its turn, they got him to admit that he had lied during his own trial and would lie again if it meant freedom. George was however not intimidated by Evans’ attorney and his dates, names, and times were all accurate. Chris came to court the next morning early, peacefully waiting for court to reconvene while reading a law book. After several witnesses went over the details of the shootout at Young's cabin, the prosecution concluded its case.

When the defense took its turn they attempted to refute George's entire statement. Attorney Hinds then attempted to show through several acquaintances that Evans had been an honest, hard working, and substantial citizen before being hunted by lawmen. Also brought in were Evans' seven children, to remind the jury that he was a devoted family man. This included Eva and Winifred, who gave their account of the gunfight in Visalia in which they insisted that detective Will Smith had called Eva a liar. This minor detail was key for the defense as it would show that the shootout had been a result of tempers caused by Smith's impudence, not by the consciousness of Evans' guilt. Smith denied ever making the comment.

Eva was also called to the stand to give testimony to the claim attributed to Vic Wilson, in which he claimed he was going to add Evans and Sontag to the notches on his gun. This was another key point for the defense as they could show that it would have therefore been useless for Evans to surrender. The prosecution heavily objected as Eva had been told by a friend that Wilson had made the comment, so her account was second hand. Eva was also given a lengthy cross examination by the prosecution, but stuck to her story. She was also questioned about a comment made by her cousin, Edith Byrd, that Eva had told her that she made up the insult attributed to Smith. Eva however insisted that the conversation never took place and that Edith's father, her uncle Perry Byrd, had betrayed her father and was the reason he was shot at Stone Corral.

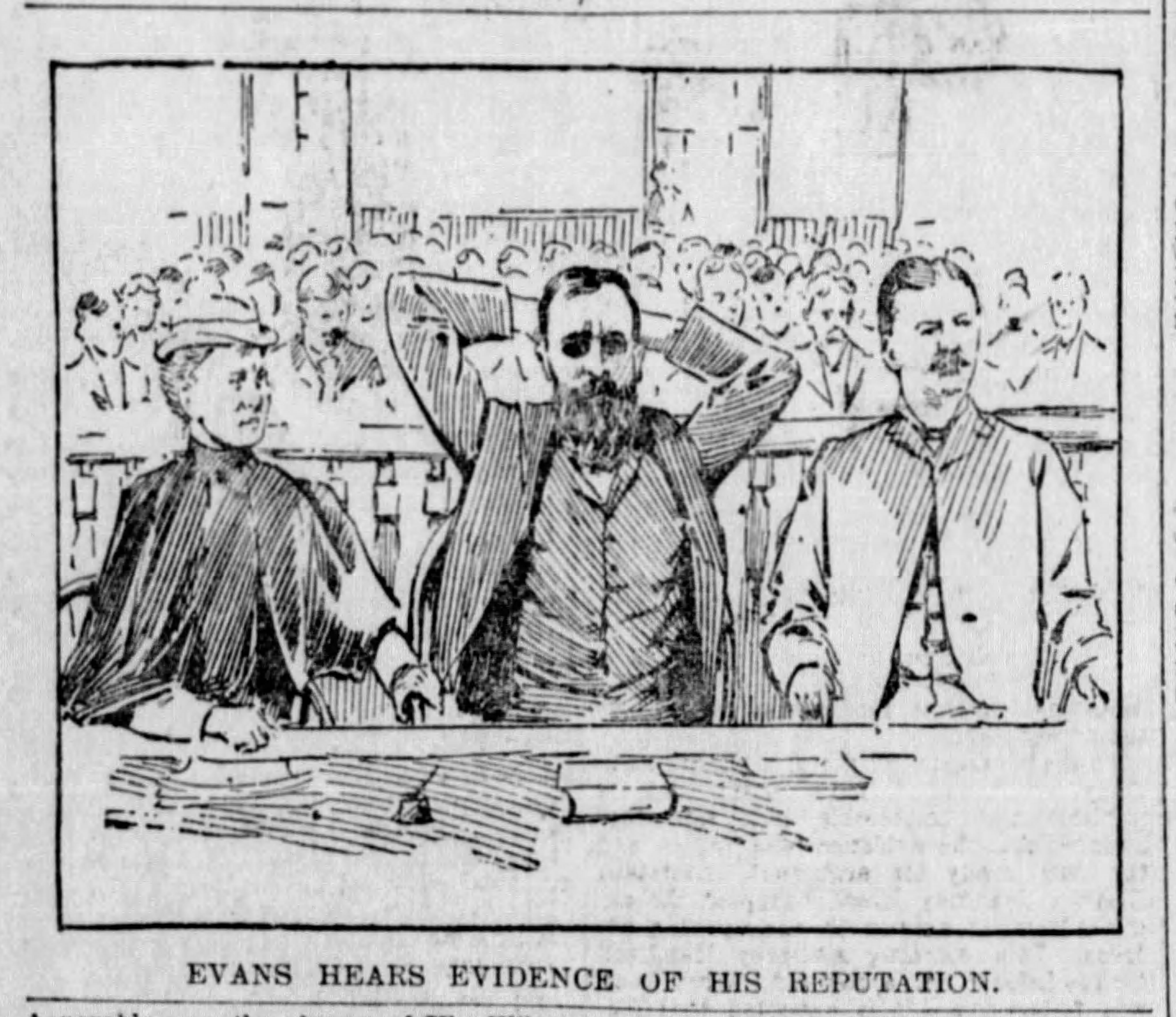
San Francisco Examiner, December 8, 1893.

The defense then read several Visalia newspaper articles which expressed concern that the two outlaws would be lynched if captured. The defense also called Clark Moore, who gave testimony to how Wilson had threatened to kill him and how Warren Hill had offered him $50,000 to betray Evans and Sontag.

Finally, Chris Evans was called to the stand and gave his own version of events, which almost completely denied George Sontag's entire story. He also gave his account of the shootout at Young's cabin, describing it as kill or be killed. While he admitted to the killing of Oscar Beaver, Andrew McGinnis, and Vic Wilson, as well as the wounding of three others, he insisted his actions were made in self defense. The prosecution attempted to show, without sufficient evidence, that he was also responsible for the killing of Gabert, Radcliff (even though it had been confirmed that his death was the result of a stray bullet from the expressman, Haswell, during the Alila robbery which had already been attributed to Bob and Emmett Dalton), and Christiansen, while committing several train robberies, as well as the indirect killing of those involved in the Folsom prison break.

On December 14, 1893, fifteen days since the trial began, the jury announced their verdict finding Christopher Evans guilty of murder in the first degree and sentenced him to life imprisonment in Folsom State Prison. Several newspapers expressed disappointment that Evans was not given the death penalty. One Visalia Times editor even wrote, “It is such miscarriages of justice that make law-abiding people resort to lynch law, and the jurors who rendered this verdict ought to be ashamed of themselves.”

Chris was distraught after learning he would not have a chance at an appeal and would be spending the rest of his life in a prison. When Eva visited him in jail that Christmas, he told her that she only needed to get him a gun, and that he would do the rest.

"There is no power on earth or heaven that can defy fate and fate is on my side. Man has no control over his own destiny. Men are only machines. When the thought strikes me and tells me to act, then I act. I may be in this jail two or three years, but I will get out at last." -Chris Evans

=== Escape from the Fresno jail ===
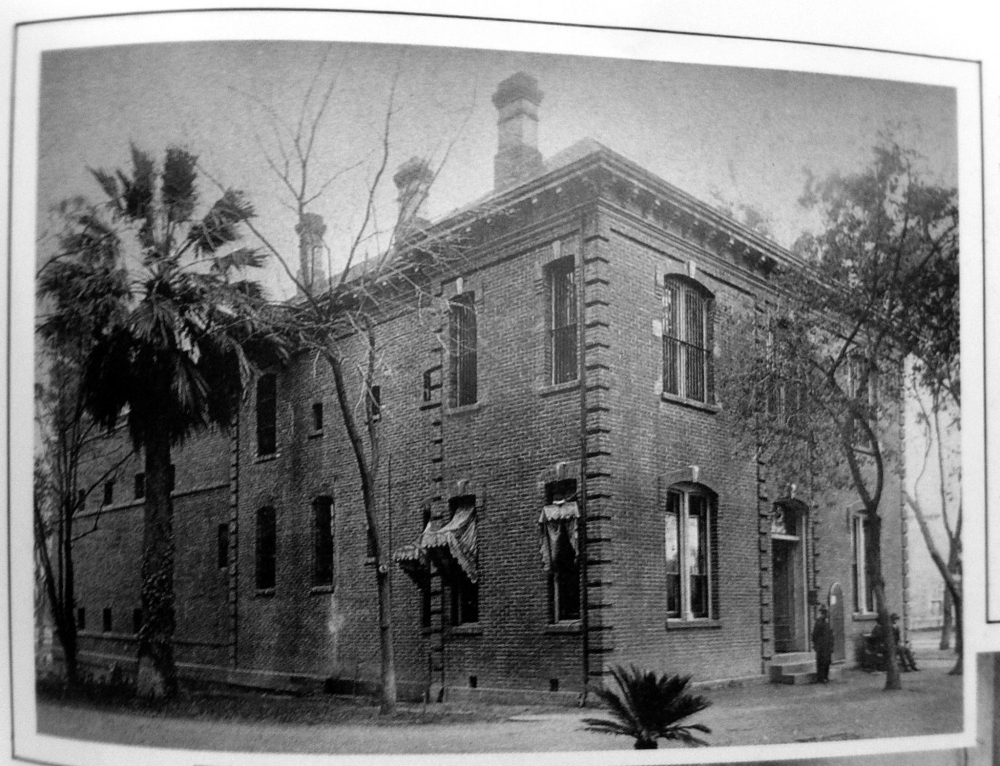
The old Fresno County Jail, built in 1880, demolished in 1957.

Earlier that September, a man became a cellmate of Chris Evans in the Fresno jail after being arrested for threatening a local blacksmith and failing to pay the $1000 fine. The twenty-three year old, who went by the name Ed Morrell, was known to be a great admirer of Evans and was obsessed with stories of his exploits. After being released, Morrell got himself arrested several more times for making death threats with the intention of getting himself back in jail. One of which times he was arrested by Officer Byrd. He was released in time for Chris Evans' trial, during which he found work at the Union Restaurant in Fresno, under the name Frank Morey.

In a letter written to Detective Will Smith during Evans’ trial that November, one of his informants described a man working for Mrs. Evans by the name of Frank Morey who was interviewing witnesses and gathering information on prospective jurors in Fresno. Ed Morrell was known to frequently visit the Evans family in Visalia and he quickly became enamored with Eva. After the trial, Eva asked Morrell to assist in her father's escape, to which he agreed, although they would not act alone.

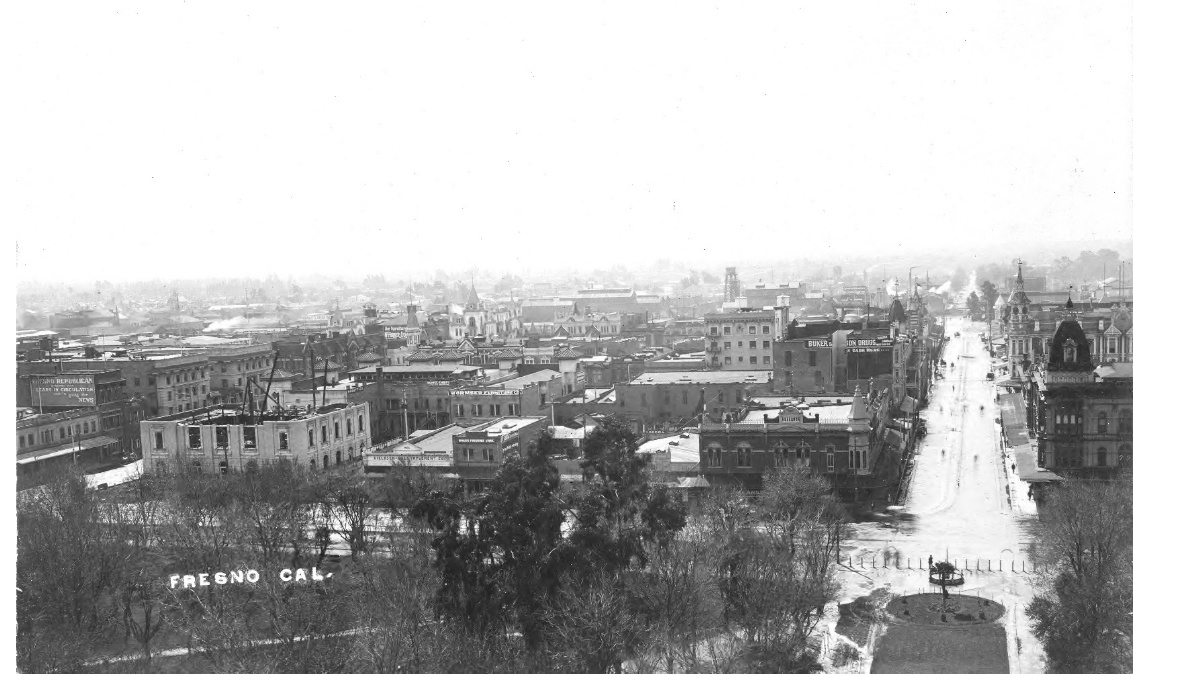
View of Victorian era Fresno looking west, from the top of the County Courthouse

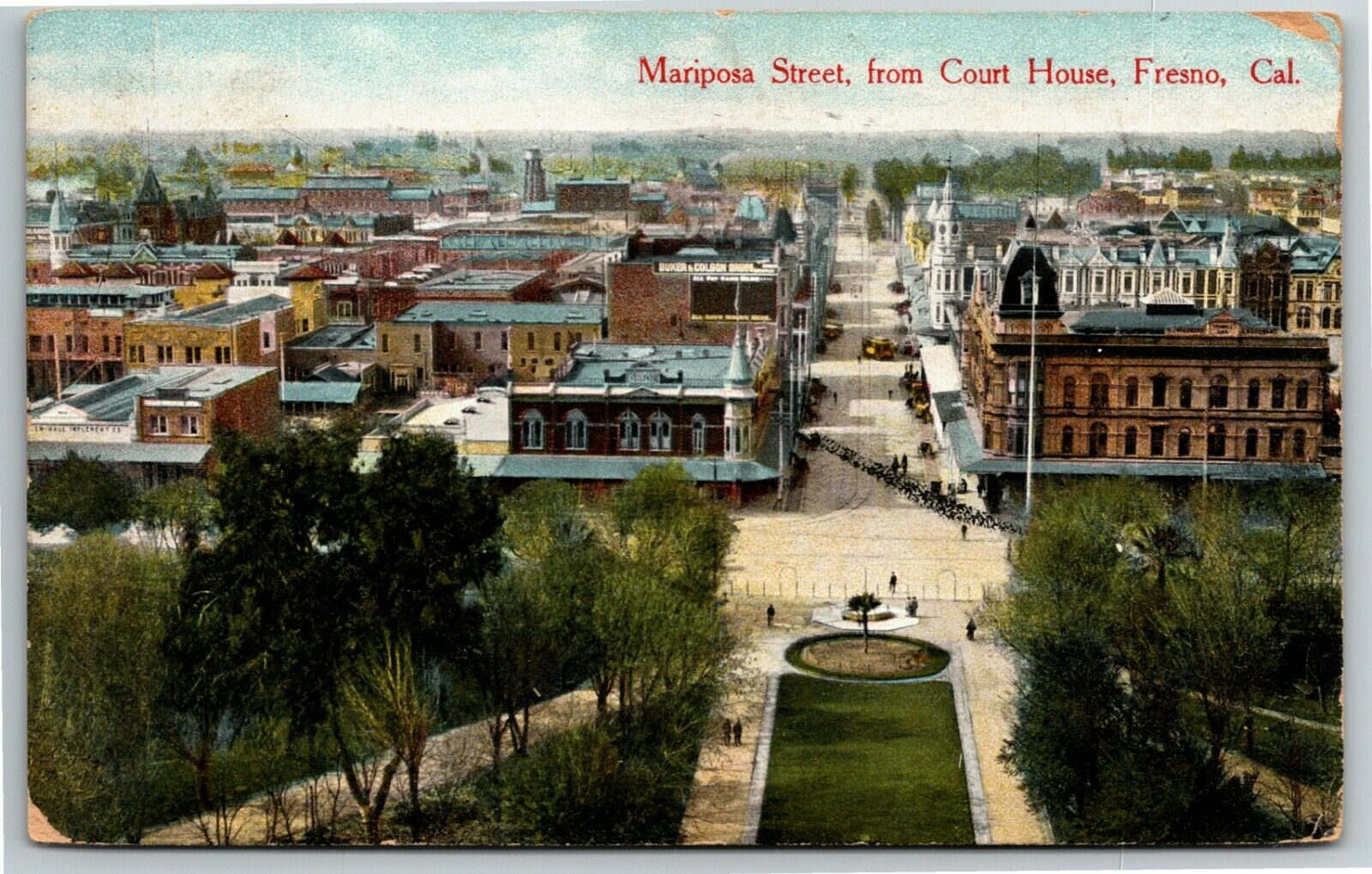
Same shot as above, reproduced as a postcard

On December 28, 1893, a friend of Ed Morrell, named Edward E. Deck, informed the conductor of the Southern Pacific Porterville branch line that there would be a hold up near Lindsay at six that evening. He explained that he was originally one of the robbers, but was revealing their plot in order to save himself. Deck told the conductor that he knew there was a large shipment of gold on board to pay for recent citrus shipments, which worried the conductor enough to alert the authorities. Upon hearing the news, every available Fresno Deputy Sheriff was sent south to intercept the robbers. The robbery however turned out to be a fake, effectively creating a diversion to allow for Evans escape. Another friend of Morrell, Jim Hutchinson, had rented a horse and buggy that afternoon from the Fresno livery stable and conveniently left it near the jail, allegedly leaving a getaway vehicle.

One person who was not aware of the escape plot was Molly Evans. The melodrama was closed for Christmas week, so she had planned to visit her husband in the Fresno jail that evening. Eva tried to talk her mother out of going, but was afraid to tell her not to go. Molly arrived at the Fresno jail on what would be a cold and very foggy evening. Most visitors to the jail met prisoners in a meeting corridor visible from the main office, but since Evans had been moved upstairs, he was permitted to be met, as well as eat meals, in his steel cell.

Since Evans was in poor health, Sheriff Scott permitted his family to send in food in addition to the food already provided by the jail. This food was delivered by the Quinby Restaurant in Fresno, where Ed Morrell had begun working as a waiter.

Sheriff Jay Scott was in San Luis Obispo that night, and his brother Ben was the only jailer present when Molly arrived. Ed Morrell arrived shortly afterwards to serve Evans his meal. Since Ben Scott was inexperienced, he let Morrell in without inspecting the food tray. Ben then locked the waiter in with the prisoner and his wife, leaving to his office. As they ate dinner, Chris lifted a napkin off his tray and revealed a revolver. He quickly shoved the gun into his pocket. Molly was horrified at what she witnessed, but remained silent. Morrell then stepped over to the door and called for Scott to let him out. As Ben opened the door, Evans and Morrell pointed their six-shooters in his face and ordered his hands up. Molly then fainted, while Evans and Morrell marched Scott in front of them out of the jail.

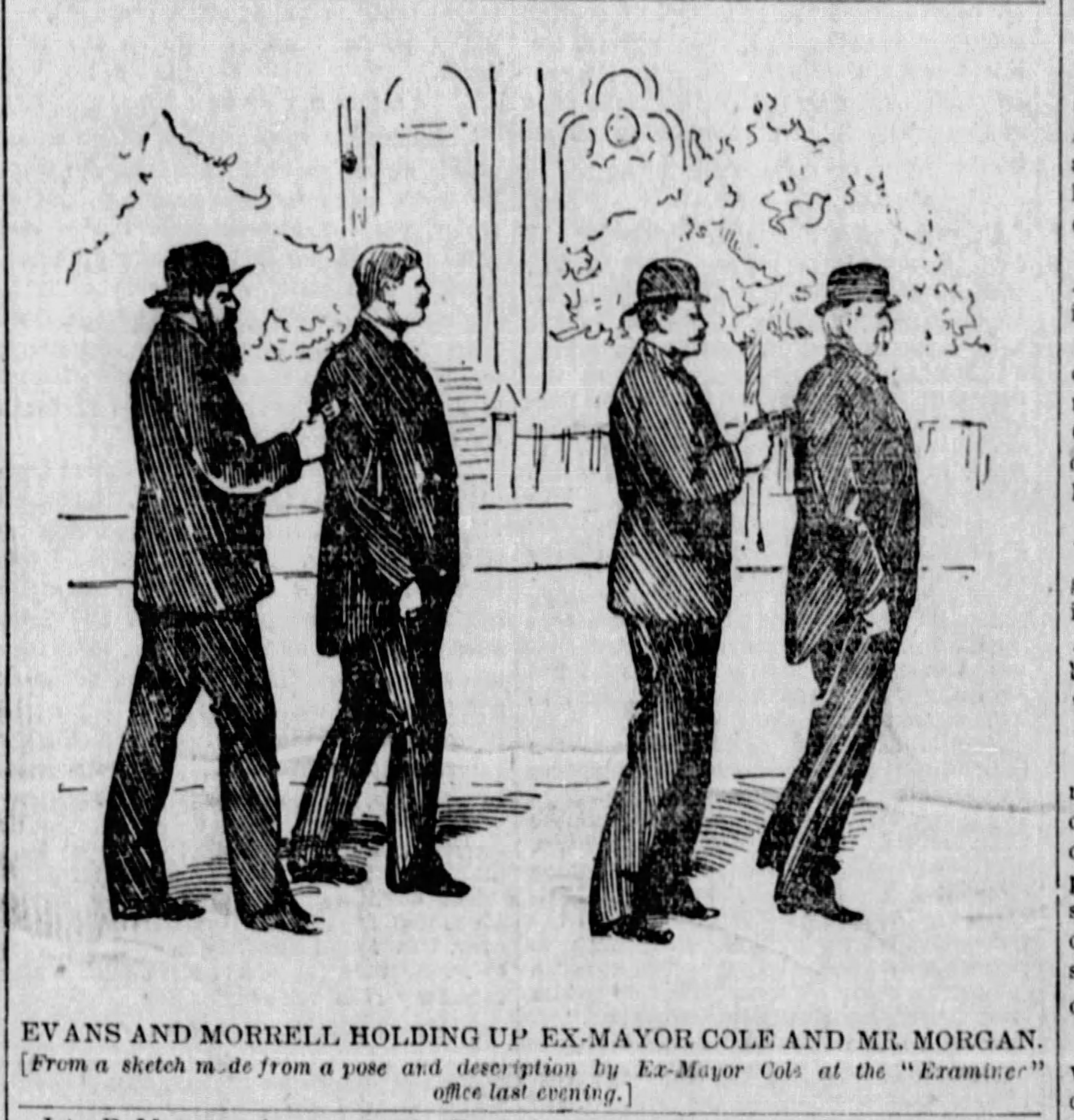
Chris Evans and Ed Morrell escape from the Fresno County jail. San Francisco Examiner, December 30, 1893

Using the heavy fog as cover, the three walked Mariposa Street until they reached M Street. A former mayor of Fresno, S.H. Cole, happened to be standing in front of a church and ran into them. Cole quickly became a hostage and the group continued through the fog until they reached an Adventist Church at N and O Streets. In front of the church was Jim Hutchinson's team, loaded with supplies and ammunition for Evans’ getaway.

At the same time, Constable John D. Morgan (later Fresno's first chief of police) happened to be meeting a former Texas Ranger, W.M. Wyatt, in front of the Advantest Church for a chicken dinner, but had arrived early. They became curious to what was happening too late, and even though the outlaws could have easily escaped, Morrell impulsively ordered their hands up. Morgan was wearing a long overcoat and was unable to reach his gun. Wyatt thought it was a robbery, and began throwing his money and possessions into the gutter. Morrell then disarmed Morgan and turned his attention to Wyatt. As he turned his back, Morgan quickly grabbed him, pinning both arms to his sides. Morrell began to struggle and yelled to Evans, "Shoot the son of a bitch!" while Wyatt stood by with his arms extended out in front of his chest in surrender. Evans ordered Morgan to release Morrell or he would kill him, and when he hesitated, Evans shot him in the shoulder, barely missing an artery.

The shot spooked the team of horses, which broke their halters and ran away. Scott and Cole were able to take advantage of the confusion and escaped into the thick fog. Evans and Morrell then made their way on foot down an alley between O and P Streets to Tulare Street.

Upon reaching the corner of Mono and Q, they intercepted Benny Cochrane, a newspaper delivery boy driving a one-horse Petaluma cart. Evans ordered the boy out of the cart, but he refused and began screaming for help. Benny's brother was nearby and began rushing over in assistance. Evans fired two shots at the brother, who ducked for cover, and threw Benny from the cart. The two fugitives then drove the cart down the road until they reached the Kings River Flume of the Sanger Lumber Company, twelve miles away near Sanger. They walked the steep boardwalk alongside the flume into the mountains until they reached Trimmer Springs Road, where they disappeared.

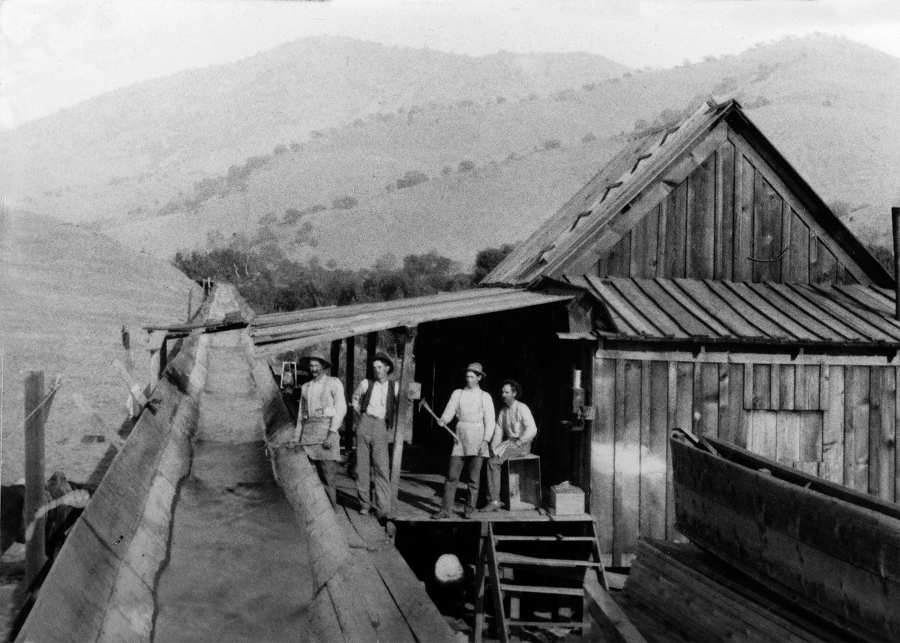
Sanger Flume House, 1890. Chris Evans and Ed Morrell followed the flume all the way to Millwood near Sequoia Lake.

Mariposa Street soon became crowded with spectators shocked at what had just occurred. After the excitement died down, Ben Scott went back to the Fresno jail and promptly arrested Molly Evans for complicity. Molly spent several days in the jail, but the charges were eventually dropped due to insufficient evidence.

An attempt was immediately made to assemble a posse at Sanger following Evans escape, but the residents merely laughed at the Fresno deputies. When Sheriff Jay Scott returned from San Luis Obispo with the fugitive he had been tracking, he was heavily criticized for Evans escape. Detective James Hume, representing Wells Fargo & Co., stated that his firm and the Southern Pacific had spent about $30,000 and three lives to capture and convict Evans. From then on Sheriff Scott would be made responsible for organizing Evans recapture. Scott immediately organized over a dozen posses and sent them to various locations, with over a hundred men in the field searching for Evans and Morrell.

Edward Deck, Morrell's friend who had told the false story of the Porterville train robbery, was arrested, charged with luring the officers away from Fresno which amounted to conspiracy. The team that had run away from the scene after Evans shot Morgan was found bogged down in the swamps of the San Joaquin River, fourteen miles west of Fresno. Found on the team was a bag full of cartridges that belonged to Morrell's friend Jim Hutchinson. He was also arrested as an accomplice, along with his brothers Will and Henry, and his wife's fourteen-year-old sister Rose Lee. All were eventually released however due to insufficient evidence. Newspapers credited Chris Evans with masterminding the entire thing. Oddly enough, Eva Evans was never suspected, interrogated, or arrested, and she returned to work with her mother as an actress in San Francisco.

=== Evans and Morrell ===
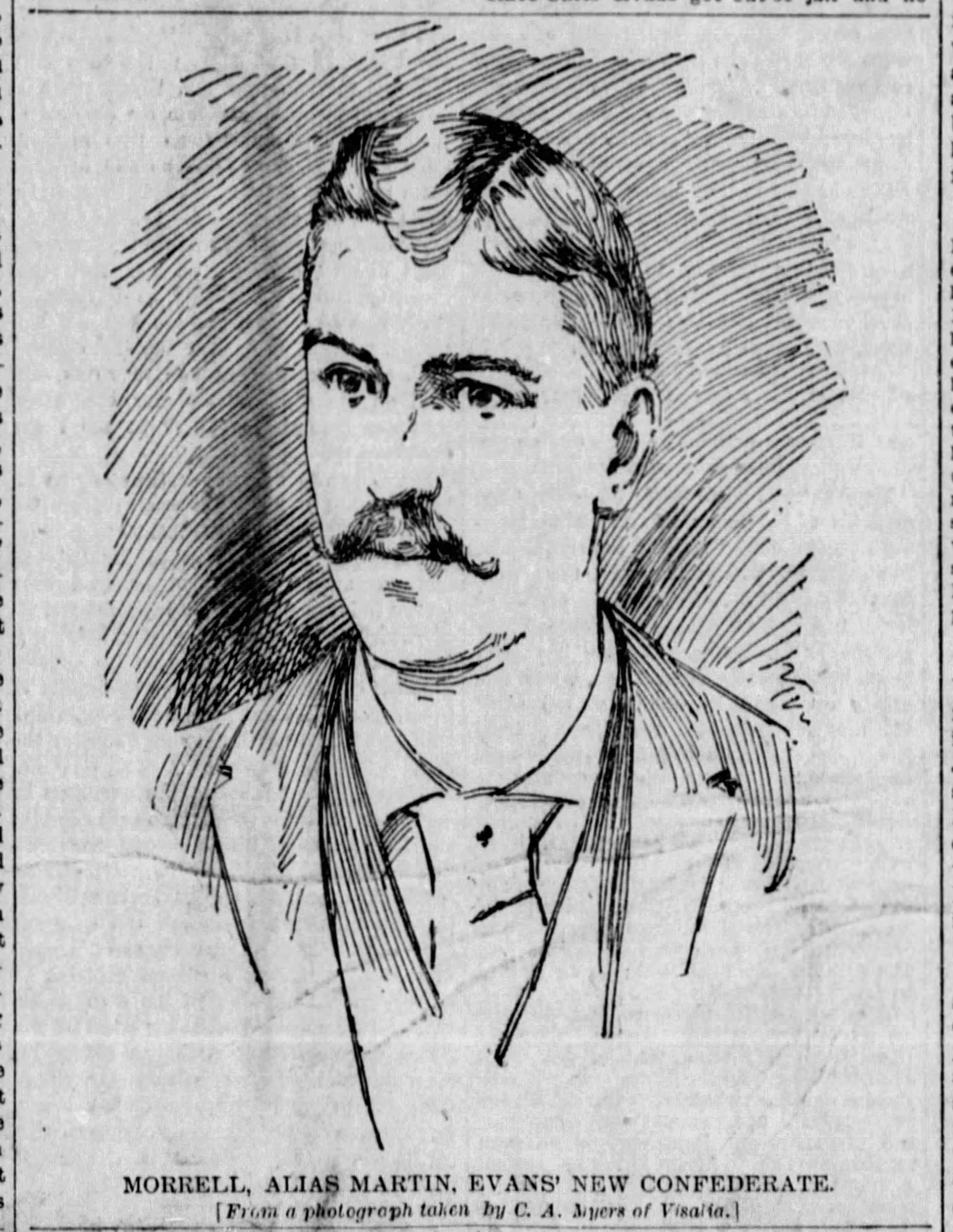
Ed Morrell. San Francisco Examiner, Saturday, December 30, 1893

On December 30, 1894, Detective James Hume received Ed Morrell's prison record from San Quentin. Morrell was received for grand larceny in San Bernardino County under the alias Ed Martin, and after two and half years he was discharged on March 27, 1893, at twenty-four years old. Hume also learned that Morrell was born Martin Delaney in 1868 in Pennsylvania, where he escaped the coal mines at a young age. Upon arriving in California, Morrell found work at a hotel in Riverside where he stole from a room and quickly left town, only to be arrested in San Bernardino.

While in San Quentin, he befriended a notorious stage robber, Milton Harvey Lee. Morrell promised Lee that he would help him once he was paroled. Upon his release, he went to Fresno where he looked up Lee's ex-wife, who remarried to a man named Hutchinson. Hutchinson had adopted Lee's two daughters, Grace and Rose. Grace had also become married to one of Hutchinson's sons, Jim. Ed Morrell fell in with the Hutchinson family, all who had seen jail on various occasions. Grace Hutchinson would later state that Morrell had become obsessed with stories of Evans and Sontag. One day he disappeared, later returning with bullet wounds, which he told Grace he had received while being cornered by lawmen in Nevada City with William Fredericks. This led her to believe he had something to do with George Sontag's escape attempt in Folsom.

Following the jailbreak, a man who had been in the Fresno jail with Chris Evans but had since been released, named Marion Childers, came into the sheriff's office and said that Evans was hiding at Frank Dusy's ranch near Selma. In jail Childers and Evans had developed a mutual hatred of each other, and on one occasion Evans even told the jailer that if Childers did not stay away from him he would kill him. A posse was sent to Dusy's ranch, where they believed Evans was hiding in a cupola that overlooked the plains. After the cupola was found to be empty, the officers decided to search the barn, using Dusy as a human shield as they approached. The officers then shot up the barn and rushed the door, only to find that it had been empty.

Chris Evans and Ed Morrell were now in the Sierra Nevada mountains in the middle of a harsh winter. While it seemed history was repeating itself, this time Evans was weakened from his long illness and suffered from the loss of his left arm and right eye, leaving him severely disadvantaged. Newt Demasters came into Fresno and claimed that the outlaws had spent the night at his logging camp on Deer Creek, four miles from Pine Flat, but gave no more details. He told the officers that Evans no longer trusted anyone since being sold out and would pay a visit to anyone who decided to give him away. The officers surrounded the cabin but again found no sight of Evans or Morrell. Two Pine Flat flume tenders also reported being threatened by Evans.

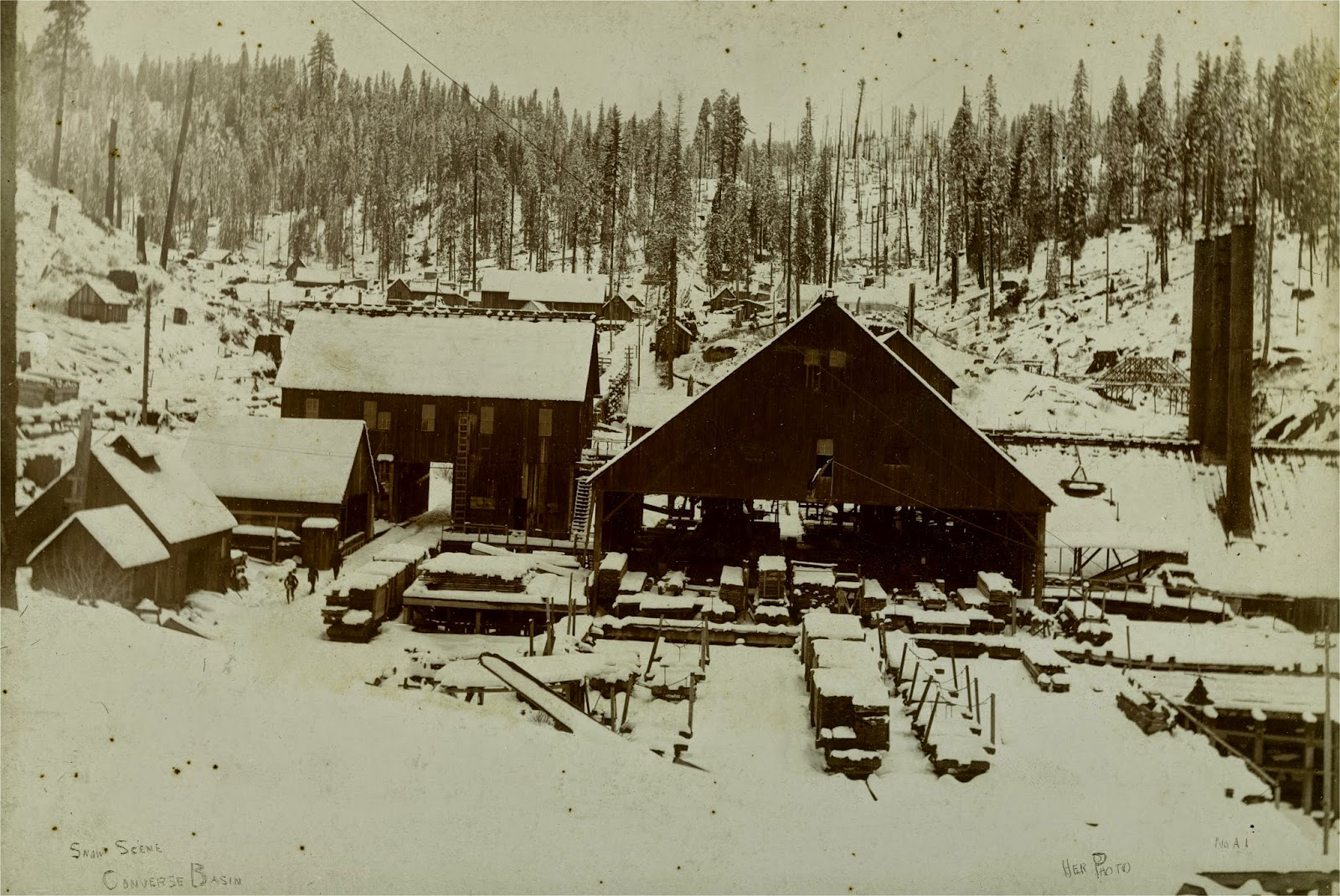
Sanger Lumber Company Sawmill at Millwood, California, on the Converse Basin

Sheriff Scott began hunting for the outlaws in the areas between Dunlap and Sampson Flat but was hindered by snow. Scott interrogated Clark Moore, as well as several other Sampson Flat residents, but all denied assisting the outlaws or knowing anything of their whereabouts. Posses then picked up their trail on the south side of the Kings River and followed it to a hog camp where they learned the fugitives had spent two nights. Evans and Morrell had noticed the trailing posse and decided to walk the boardwalk of the Kings River Lumber flume until they reached its end at the logging town of Millwood, only a few miles from General Grants Grove. Here lumber operations had closed down for the winter, besides a few caretakers who had entertained Evans and Sontag the year before.

After making their way through the snow in Fresno County, Evans decided that they would head south into Tulare County to avoid the pressure put on by Sheriff Scott's posse. They finally went down to the Downing ranch on Dry Creek where Evans' loyal friends were again able to offer him supplies. It had not snowed on the road to the valley that winter, so Bill Downing was still able to leave for food and provisions. Since the road was open both ways, it was decided that it was unsafe for Evans and Morrell to stay at the Downings in case of roaming posses.

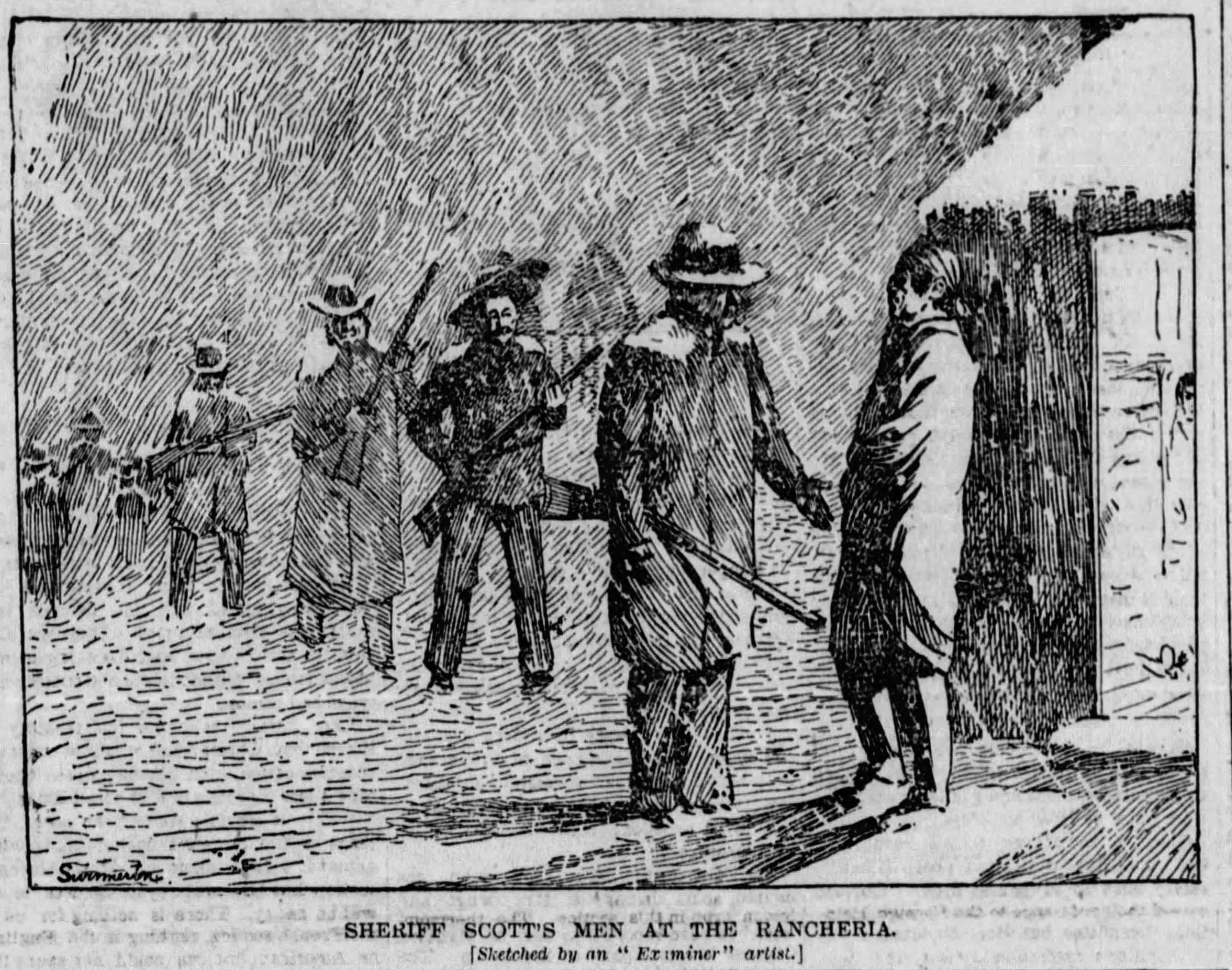
Sheriff Scott's posse search the Cold Springs Rancheria. San Francisco Examiner, January 9, 1894.

Evans' old camp at Fort Defiance, not far up Dry Creek from the Downings, had been discovered and reported by H. D. Barton of Auckland shortly after the shootout at the Stone Corral and was no longer a viable hideout. The outlaws decided to move to one of Evans' previous hideouts that still remained secret, Camp Manzanita, on Hartland Ridge. This place was surrounded by a dense growth of large manzanita bushes, making the hideout nearly impenetrable, with a small cabin and fireplace built into a large exposed granite slab. After making their way to the camp, Evans rediscovered a cat in the cabin that Sontag and him had befriended the year before.

Elijah Perkins' son Elmer, reported that he had gone to his grandmother's house to find her agitated over a recent visit made by Evans and Morrell. During the visit Evans appropriated one of Mrs. Perkins' horses and carts and said that he was going to Visalia to kill her son Elijah and her son-in-law Perry Byrd. Evans hated Elijah for reporting his presence at the Perkins home to the sheriff's office after Stone Corral. He also believed his brother-in-law Perry Byrd set the trap that led to his capture and Sontag's death. Upon hearing the news, Elmer rode to Visalia to warn his father and uncle, only to find that Evans' threat had been a bluff.

On the evening of January 10, 1894, a masked man entered the railroad station at Fowler with two revolvers drawn and held up the railroad agent, George A. Leon, and three other men for twenty dollars. Two local passersby, A. A. Vincent and Howard Harris, stopped to watch the holdup through the window. The robber then pulled them into the depot at gunpoint and yelled, “Do you know who I am? I'm Ed Morrell!” He then robbed them of an additional forty dollars. He then marched the six men to the Kutner-Goldstein store across the street. While looting the cash register, the robber was interrupted by Constable Charles Oaks. The startled peace officer hastily fired two shots, but missed, wounding two locals, Pat Lahey and H. A. Mulligan, in the arm and shoulder. The robber then shot Oaks in the hip and the constable fell to the floor and rolled out through the open door.

On January 15, Grace Hutchinson ran into Evans and Morrell about three miles east of Kingsburg, while they were on their way from Reedley to Traver in a cart. Here Morrell told her about the Fowler robbery, claiming to have been in desperate need of money, and that Evans had waited nearby with a cart. Although the newspapers had reported that seven people had been robbed and $70 taken, Morrell claimed that he had robbed four others and got $150.

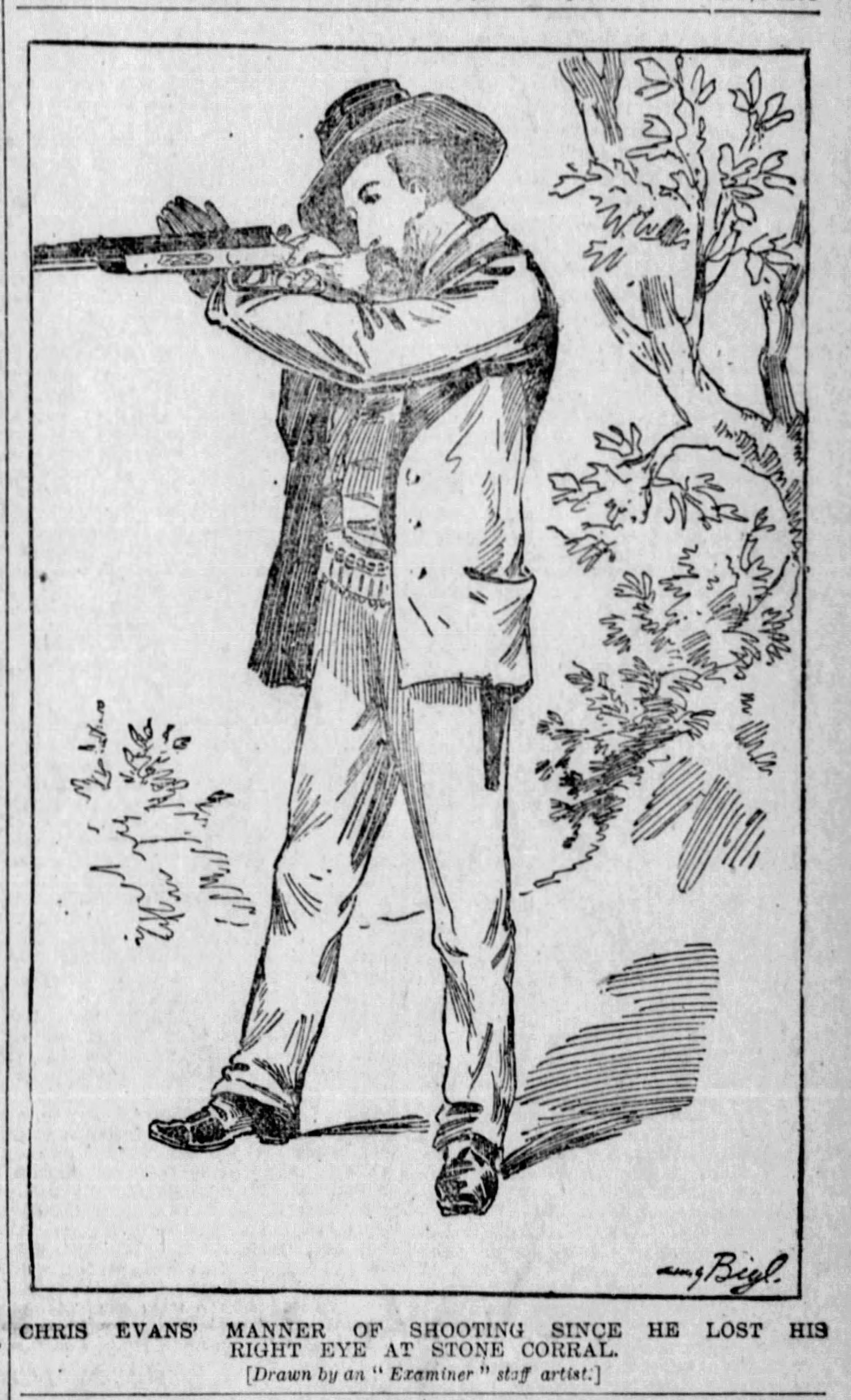
Chris Evans during the shootout near Camp Badger, San Francisco Examiner, February 4, 1894.

From the Perkins home a posse consisting of deputies L. Parker Timmins and Charles Boyd, were able to track the outlaws to Camp Badger. The posse followed the tracks to a creek near the home of Dan St. Clair, where Evans and Morrell were eating breakfast. Timmins dismounted from his horse and went over a steep ridge on foot. As Boyd made his way over the grade in his cart, he was surprised to notice a cabin with Evans standing in the doorway. Evans called out to him, “Come in and be sociable.”

When Boyd hesitated, Evans fired at him with his rifle, hitting Boyd's cart seat. Boyd managed to turn around while Timmins covered him from the top of the ridge, but he lost control of his cart and crashed. Boyd then unhitched his horse and took off down the road towards Reedley. Timmins was then pinned down by the shots from both Evans and Morrell and when the outlaws rushed up the hill he found himself alone. Timmins then made a full retreat, taking cover from one bush to another as Morrell followed him for a short distance while firing at him. Timmins managed to escape and reported the shootout at Slick Rock to authorities in Reedley.

Evans and Morrell again returned to Camp Manzanita, their secret hideout on Hartland Ridge, but this secret was not as safe as Evans believed. The younger children in the Downing family had known about Camp Manzanita when it had been used by Evans and Sontag. When they were warned by their father to never reveal its location to anyone, they kept this promise. However, after John Sontag's death and Evans' incarceration, they believed the silence was over. One day, in a moment of excitement, the Downing children had shown Camp Manzanita to a young relative named Walter Kirkland while out adventuring. When Evans and Morrell suddenly showed up at their home, they knew they had made a mistake, but were afraid to tell their parents in fear of punishment. They only hoped Kirkland would remain silent.

After Deputies Timmins and Boyd returned to Reedley, Walter Kirkland went to them and offered to lead them to Evans lair. The deputies telegraphed the sheriff's office, and not long after they were picked up by a posse consisting of deputies Bill Henry, Ed Miles, Fred Smart, P.J. Mead, Thomas Burns and Hi Rapelje. The posse then followed Kirkland into the mountains.

On the night of February 7, Evans and Morrell were sitting in front of the fireplace at Camp Manzanita while Evans read a newspaper aloud. Evans was in his shirtsleeves and had taken off his artificial arm his wife had given him, as his stump still pained him. As Evans paused to laugh with Morrell over something he found funny, the posse came up upon the cabin. As several men in the posse attempted to move to the other side of the cabin to get a crossfire, deputy Timmins stepped on a twig and caused Evans' pet cat to sound the alarm. Evans ran out of the cabin without a coat or hat, and aimed his rifle at the posse when deputy Henry fired, barely grazing Evans' scalp. Evans and Morrell did not return fire but instead ran behind the large granite slab against which the cabin had been built, and disappeared into an arriving blizzard.

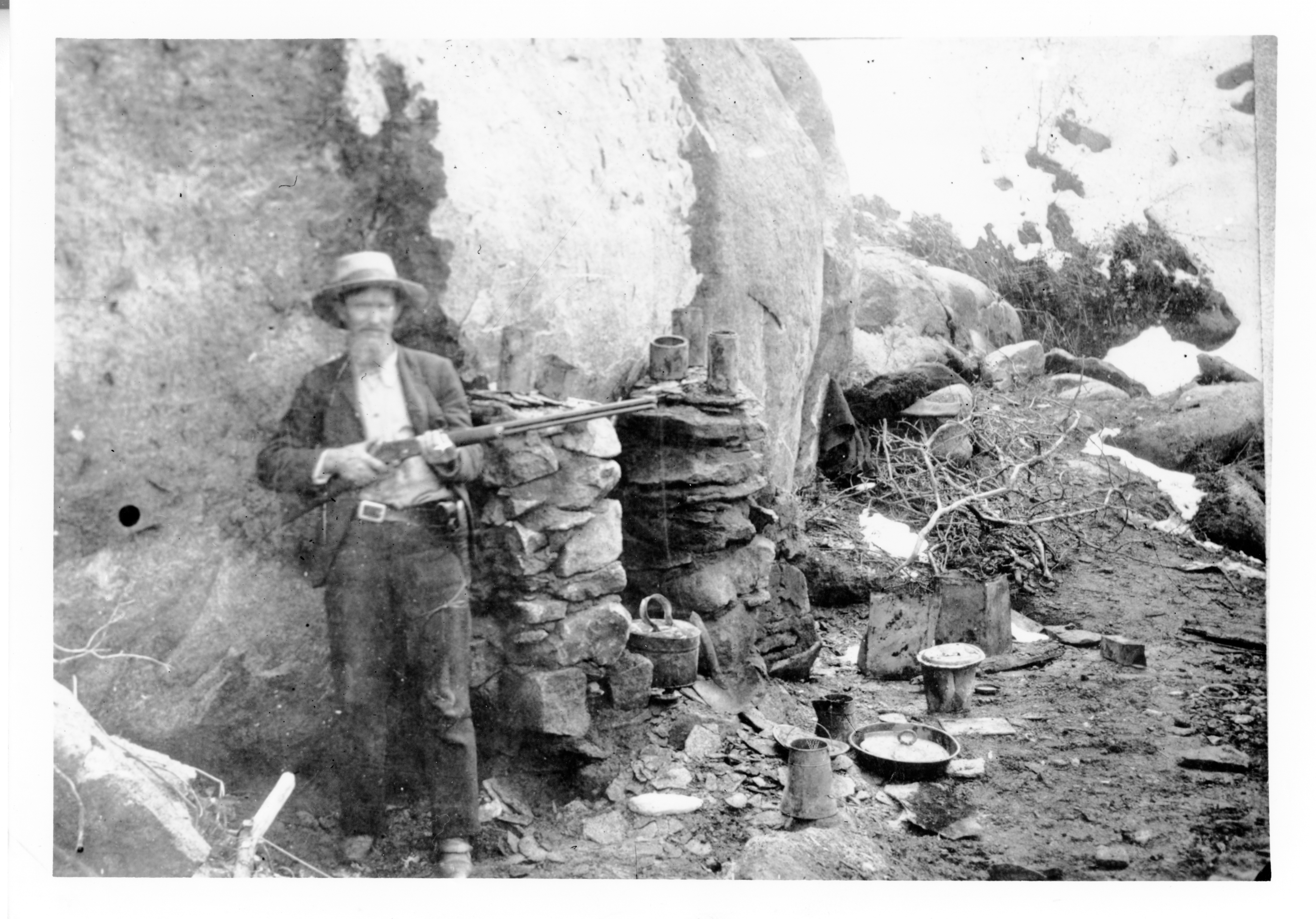
One of Sheriff Scott's posse members standing in front of the burnt down remains of Camp Manzanita

The deputies attempted to follow the outlaws but as the blizzard worsened they gave up, sure that Evans would die in the extreme cold without a hat or coat.

When the posse returned to Camp Manzanita they found food, ammunition, and Evans’ false arm, which Sheriff Scott put on exhibit in the Fresno jail. Before leaving Camp Manzanita, the posse removed some of the contents and then burned the small cabin to the ground. After twenty-four hours the storm broke and Evans and Morrell took shelter with an old Yokuts friend in Eshom Valley. Later they returned to the Downings and learned how they had been betrayed by Kirkland.

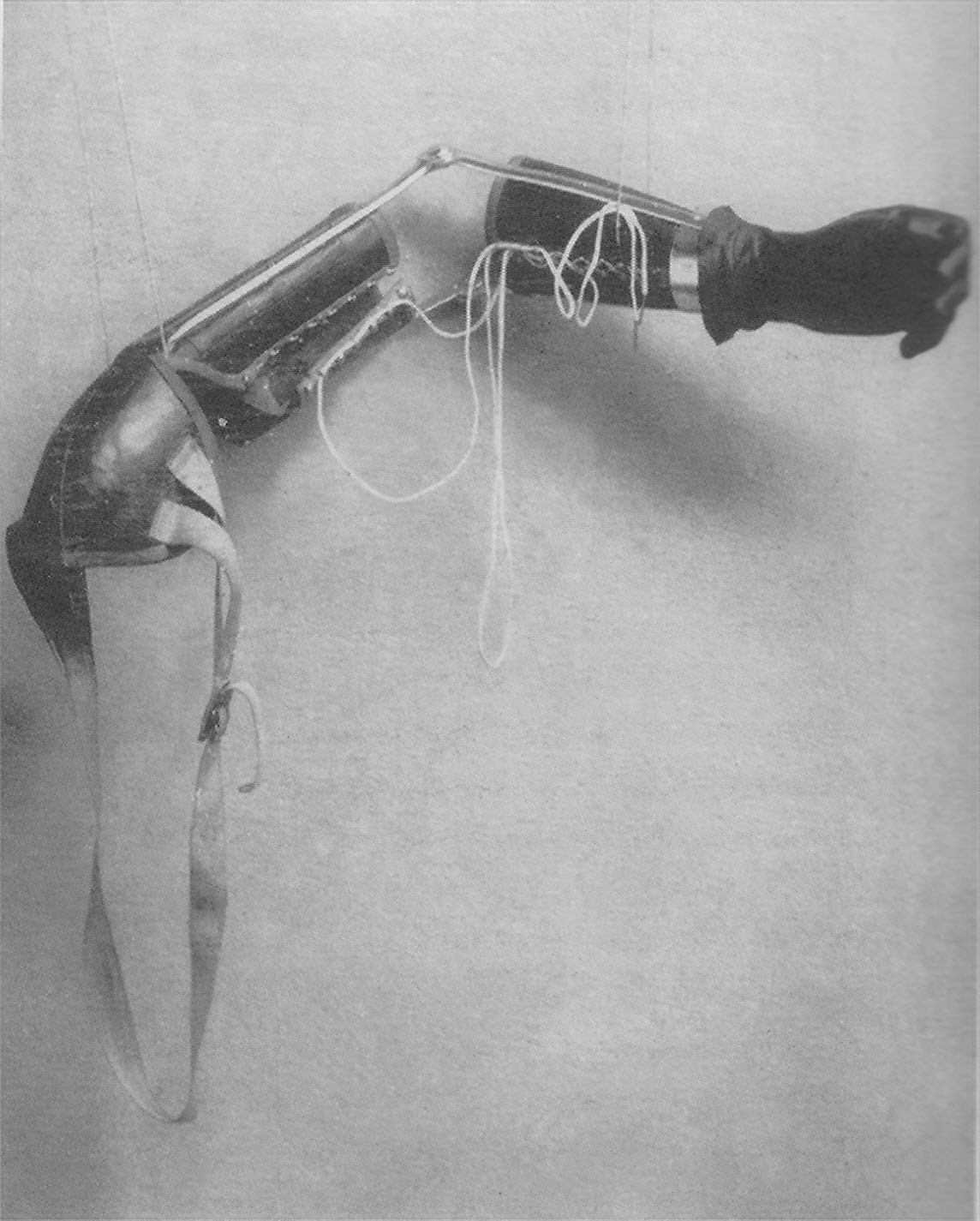
Chris Evans' artificial arm on display in the Fresno County Jail, 1894

Over the next few weeks Evans and Morrell faced harsh winter weather in the mountains. Chris Evans was severely ill and weakened by the loss of his arm and the two outlaws were forced to travel from friend to friend relying on handouts. The posse pressed hard on the outlaws trail, convinced Evans had made up his mind to die rather than be captured.

As Molly and Eva Evans had begun touring again with the melodrama, now Evans and Sontag: Up to Date, the Evans children had been sent to live with their Grandmother Byrd in Visalia. To help care for the six children, Molly hired a couple named the Brightons. Mrs. Brighton and her husband Jonas had recently rented the foreclosed Evans’ home from Sol Sweet & Company and had befriended the Evans family that previous summer.

It was not a coincidence that Jonas V. Brighton and his wife would earn the friendship of Molly Evans, but at the time very few people in Visalia knew anything about him. Jonas Brighton was actually an undercover detective for Marshal Gard, who rented the foreclosed Evans home with the purpose of gaining the trust of the Evans family in order to obtain information that could be used against Chris. Prior to his arrival in California, Brighton was known for killing Ike Clanton in 1887, one of the outlaws who famously fought Wyatt Earp at the O.K. Corral. Upon arriving in Visalia from Los Angeles, Brighton kept a low profile by acting as an old, tired handyman and eventually was hired by Molly Evans to do a few minor jobs. When Molly began touring with the melodrama, she trusted the Brightons enough to watch over her children while she was away.

Two weeks after the burning of Camp Manzanita, Bill Downing made a trip to the valley for supplies. After deciding to check on the Evans children, Downing was told by the Brightons that the youngest child, Carl, was so deathly ill that Bill could not even see him. Downing delivered the news to Chris and told him that if he wanted to see his son alive he should go to Visalia at once.

Evans and Morrell set out for the valley immediately and snuck into Visalia during the night of February 17. They immediately went to the old Evans home where they told Mrs. Brighton they had not eaten for two days. After serving the men dinner, Jonas Brighton told Chris that Baby Carl was suddenly feeling much better and had fully recovered. Evans then began to suspect Brighton of being a traitor.

According to a later interview with Grandmother Byrd, after returning from a trip to Bakersfield on the evening of the 18th, she immediately went to check on the Evans children but was surprised to find Evans and Morrell. She remained at the Evans house for about an hour when her son George Byrd showed up. When George entered the house, Evans drew his Winchester and said, “You dirty bastard, I intend to kill you.” When Grandmother Byrd asked him what he meant, he told her, “I mean to kill that son of a bitch. He is a traitor.” Chris then told them he would not have his children raised by any of them. When George attempted to leave, Morrell blocked the door and said that they were going to kill George and Perry Byrd. After a while, Grandmother Byrd was able to eventually calm Chris down.

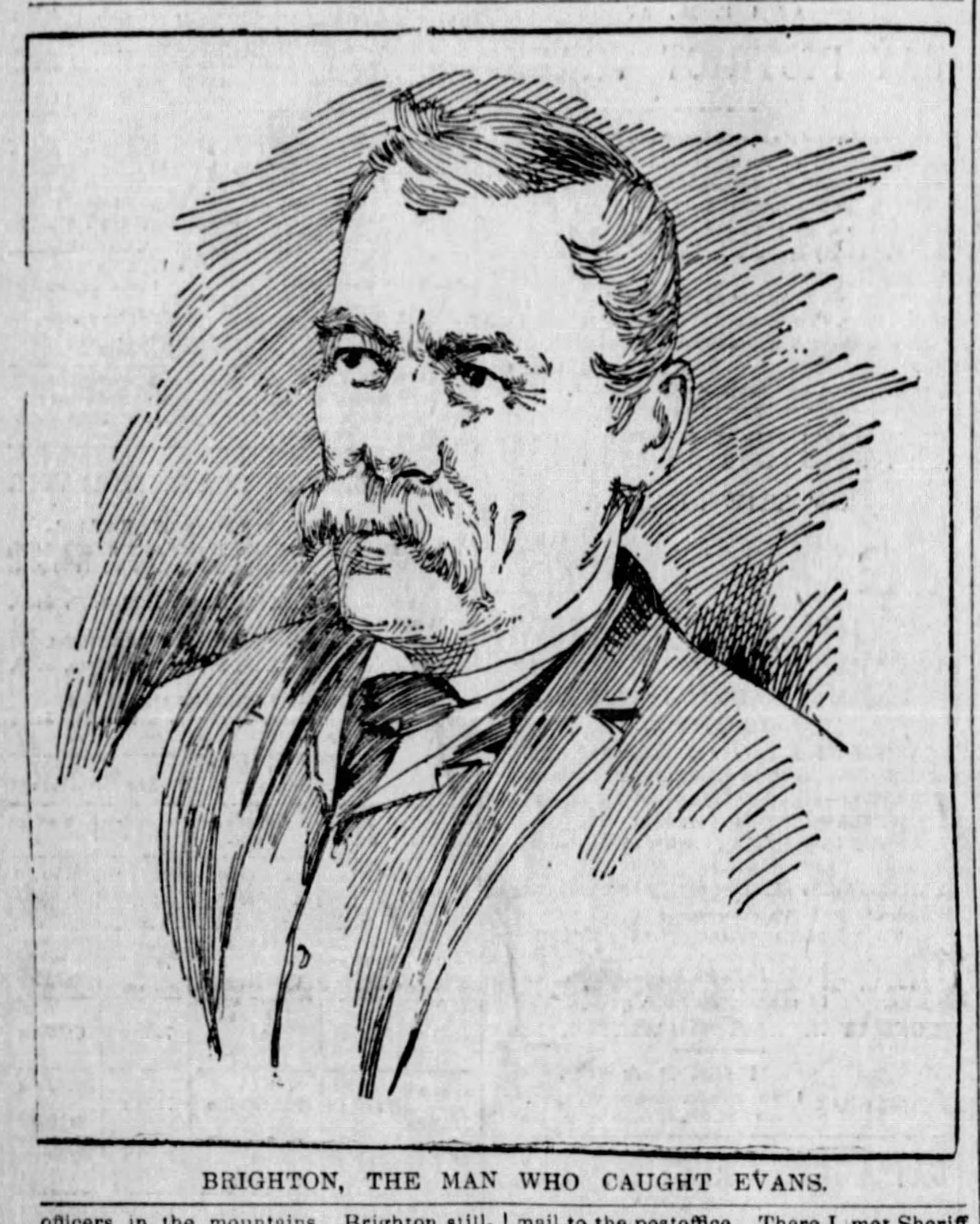
Jonas Brighton, San Francisco Examiner, Sunday, February 25, 1894

As the outlaws slept that night, Jonas Brighton snuck out of the house and alerted Sheriff Kay that Evans and Morrell were in town. Kay immediately wired Marshal Gard in Los Angeles and ordered several posses to guard all the roads leading out of town. Gard arrived in Visalia around 3am, but the two decided not to do anything until daybreak.

As daylight arrived the morning of February 19, Evans and Morrell woke up to find the house surrounded by Gard and Kay's posse. The posse consisted of fifty armed men, including Deputy George Witty and Deputy Perry Byrd. At around 8am, Sheriff Kay arrested Jonas Brighton for being an accomplice of Evans in order to deflect suspicion towards him. The news that Evans was surrounded had spread quickly and drew a large crowd of people to the house. Brighton then sent a letter to his wife telling her to leave the house with the Evans’ children immediately.

Regardless of Kay's plan to distract suspicion from Brighton, Evans now knew he was a traitor. When Mrs. Brighton got the note and attempted to leave with the children, Evans' refused. Later, Mrs. Brighton and others in the house would accuse Evans of losing his temper, picking Mrs. Brighton up, throwing her into a bedroom and kicking her in the ribs. Before he could kick her again, Morrell interfered and Mrs. Brighton fainted. The Evans family would later emphatically deny Brighton's accusations.

Although it is never clearly stated, it is most likely the case that Evans did not allow Grandmother Byrd or her son George to leave the Evans house the night prior. It was later reported by the Examiner that Grandmother Byrd was escorted out of the Evans house during the confrontation that morning by a man named M. P. Frazier. In her later interview, she told reporters that when leaving the Evans house with Frazier, she told him to walk in between her and the house saying Evans would kill her as willingly as he would a rattlesnake.

Even with the presence of the mob, Sheriff Kay could find no one brave enough to approach the house with a message. Morrell was unknown to most, but everyone feared Evans. The posse did not want to fire into the house in fear of hurting others, which included six of the Evans children. Sheriff Kay knew that Evans had a fondness for children, so he sent an eight-year-old boy named George Morris to carry his first message to the outlaws. “Chris Evans: Surrender and we will protect you. If not we will take you anyway. E. W. Kay, Sheriff.”

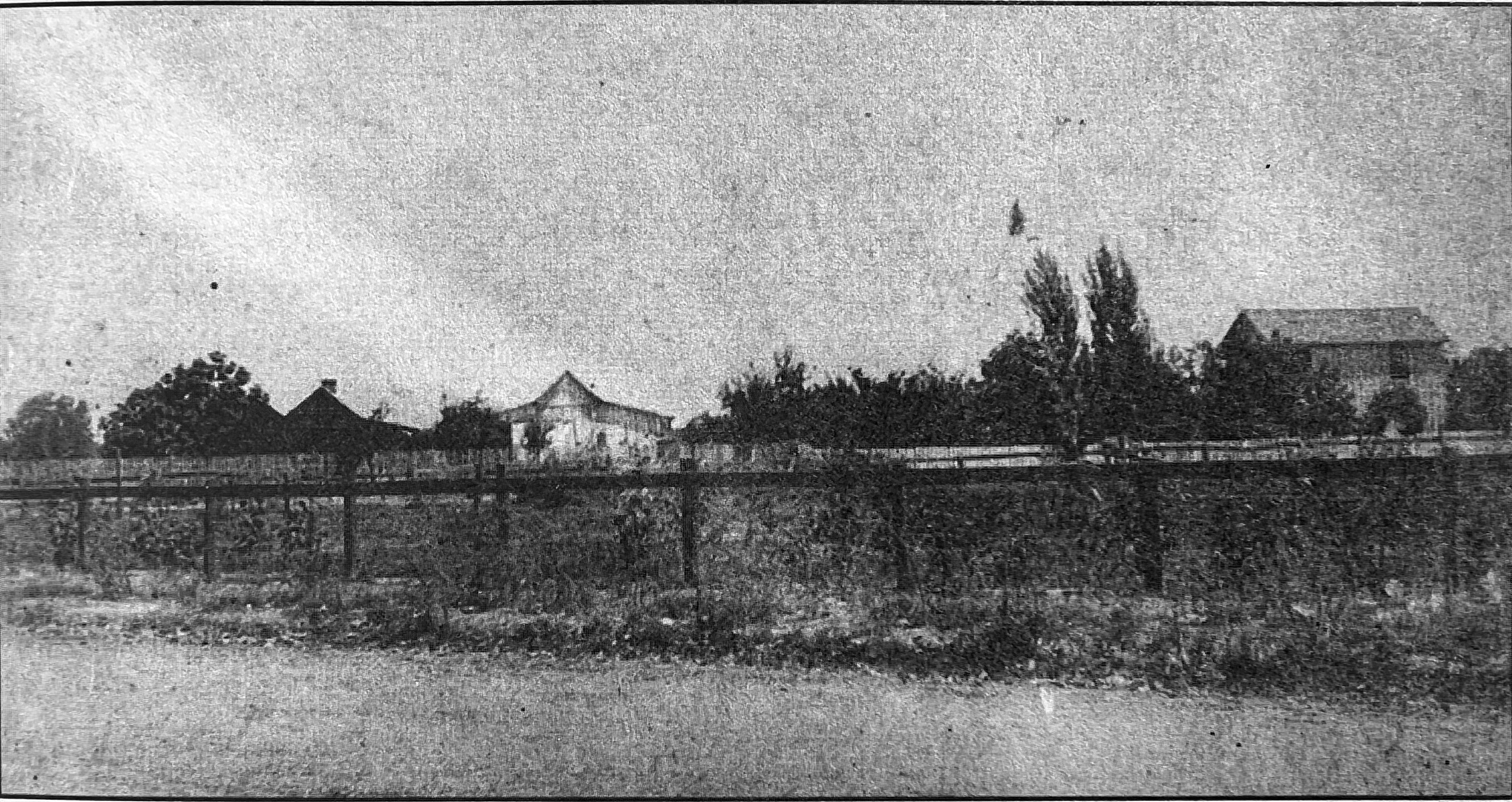
Chris Evans home in 1892. The Evans house is on the left, the barn is in the center, and the Byrd home is at the right.

Evans knew the danger that the presence of the mob meant and sent the boy back with a message asking Sheriff Kay to disperse it. The boy's grandmother eventually came and rescued her grandson, so the posse was left to find another messenger. A local twenty-two year old, named Walter Beason, offered to serve as messenger for the Sheriff if he paid him a dollar. The Sheriff agreed and Beason made his way to the back door of the house, holding the note over his head as a white flag.

Before he could knock, the door swung open and he looked into the barrel of two rifles. He was then pulled into the house by Evans and Morrell. They asked Beason what he wanted and if he was an officer. He replied that he was not, but that he had a note. “Mr. Evans: You have a chance to surrender. Surrender now without being hurt. If you give up to me, I will protect you and let the law take its course. I will disperse this mob if you say so, and will meet you. E. W. Kay.”

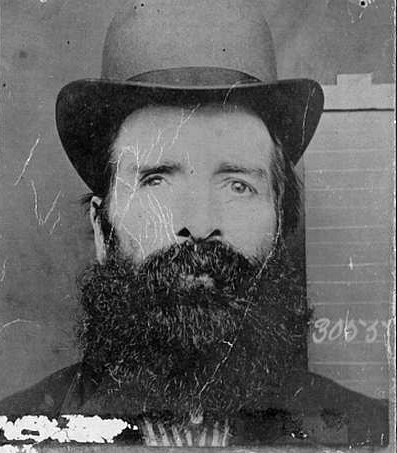
Chris Evans, February 21, 1894

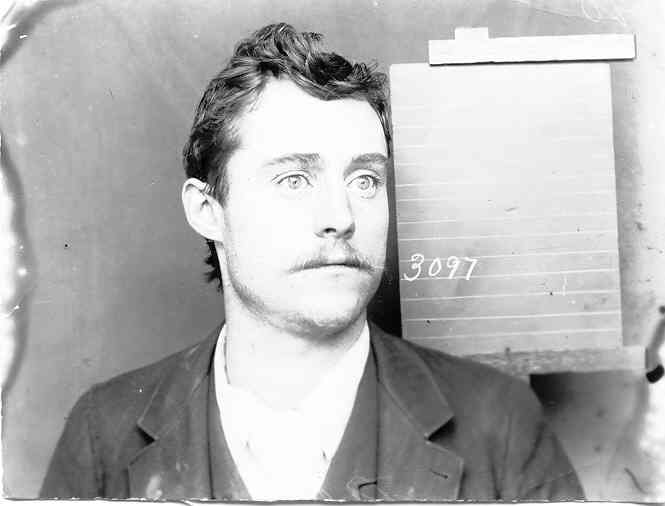
Ed Morrell, April 14, 1894.

After they read it, Beason told them he wanted to take back an answer. They both laughed and told him he might keep on wanting. They then asked Beason how the officers were situated and their chances of escape. When he told them they were surrounded and who was in the crowd, Evans wanted to surrender. Morrell insisted that they fight, but Evans told him there was no chance and urged that they give up.

Instead of sending Beason back with another message, they decided to hold him hostage, and instead sent Chris’ son Joe with a note. Evans agreed to surrender, but only if Kay would disperse the crowd and bring only Deputy Hall with him to the porch to talk. When Kay and Hall reached the gate, both Evans and Morrell walked out onto the porch with their hands up. The Sheriff walked to the porch and Evans said: "Our word is good. If you protect us, we will surrender." Kay arrested Evans and brought him safely through the crowd to the Visalia jail.

With his sentence pending, it was decided that Chris should be taken to the jail in Fresno. A lynch mob had formed in Visalia, and the officers decided to move Evans at midnight by horse and buggy instead of waiting for the next train. He received his official life sentence the next day and was transported to Sacramento via train before being taken to Folsom State Prison. His wife accompanied him on the train ride to Folsom. Chris smiled and bowed as thousands congregated at the depots to see him as he passed through the San Joaquin Valley. People trampled over each other in an effort to gain access to the prison car, so Evans opened his window and shook hands with as many people as he could. He arrived at Folsom on February 21 and Warden Aull promised him that his time as a celebrity was over.

Ed Morrell wrote a letter to Molly Evans pleading with her or Eva to help him break from the Fresno Jail, but the letter was discovered by the guards before he could smuggle it out. He was found guilty after ten minutes of deliberation in the Fresno County Superior Court. On April 16, 1894, he was sentenced to hard labor in the rock quarries of Folsom Prison for the duration of his natural life. He was later transferred to San Quentin and banished to solitary confinement, where he struggled to keep his sanity.

On March 23, 1894, William Fredericks attempted to rob a bank on Market Street in San Francisco. During the robbery, he killed the cashier and was eventually caught by police. Fredericks was found guilty of murder and sent to San Quentin. During his trial he admitted that he had supplied the weapons in George Sontag's attempted prison break and that he had stolen the weapons. He said that George's revolver was given to him by Eva Evans. He was executed on July 26, 1895.

== Later life ==
Evans had strongly protested against his sentencing to Folsom, and requested that he could instead be sent to San Quentin. Some officials were also keen to oblige this request, as they were concerned Chris might try to exact revenge on George Contant. The prisoners at Folsom were eager to get a sight of Chris, just like the crowds in Fresno and Sacramento. Molly Evans watched as her husband was taken across the prison yard and through a doorway. Working across the yard was another convict who watched Evans with interest. Molly could see that it was George Contant, wearing a red shirt and a red banded hat that was issued to the prisoners which had tried to escape. She cursed him as a liar and a traitor and said that she'd like to put a bullet in him.

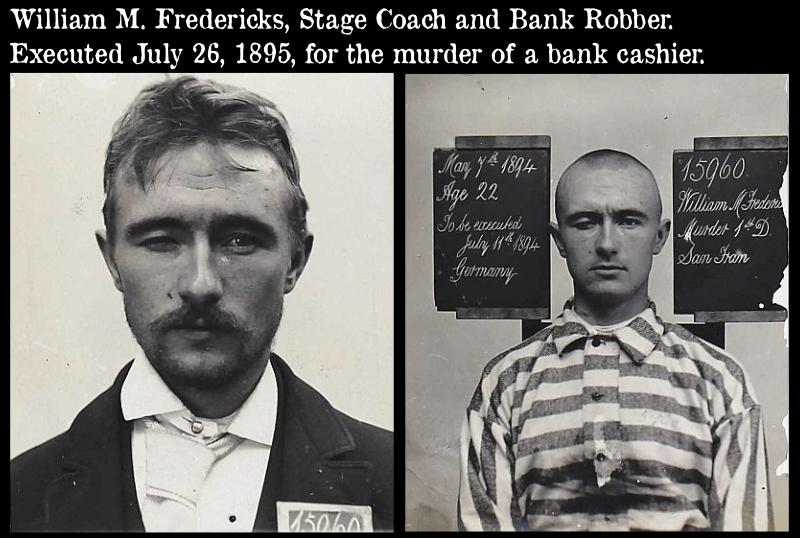
William M Fredericks after his arrest in 1894

When Chris emerged from the door thirty minutes later he was almost unrecognizable. His long hair and long beard had been clean shaven, making him look shorter and older. Instead of the dark clothes he came in with, he now wore the traditional stripes of Folsom prison. Once inside the prison walls, Chris Evans became just another prisoner. He became prisoner #3055 and only in the prison register was there any connection between the number and Chris Evans.

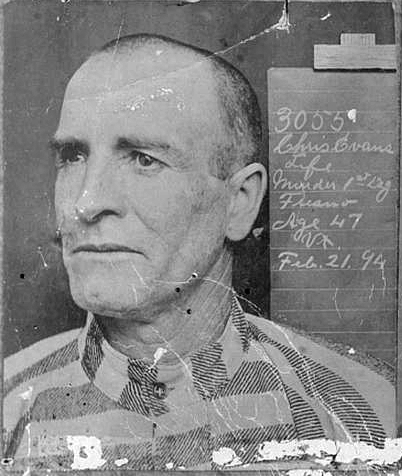
Chris Evans, after his entry into Folsom State Prison with stripes and a clean shave, February 21, 1894.

When his daughter Eva came to see him, she gagged from the smell of iodoform that was used to wash the prisoners clothes. He told her that the pain from the bullet in his brain never eased up and that he had not seen the sun since being incarcerated. He did however like his cellmate, the renowned highwayman Dick Fellows, who was writing his autobiography. He was also able to find work in the library and was free to read whatever book he chose. When asked about the family, Eva replied that they were all doing well, but this was far from the truth. The family was struggling financially, and none of the children were able to finish grammar school as they all had to find work. After a failed tour of Evans and Sontag in Oregon, Eva's acting career was in shambles. It also seemed that, wherever she went in California, she was subject to bad press.

Shortly after beginning the Evans and Sontag melodrama, Eva had married her fellow actor and cousin, James Evans. Molly did not approve of the marriage and, months after their 1893 marriage, James Evans would abandon Eva causing her to file for divorce. It is unknown what Chris thought of the marriage, or if he knew about it at all. Before the divorce was finalized, rumors appeared in an article of the press claiming that Eva had brought suit to recover interest in a mine in the mountains owned by John Sontag, based on the claim that she was the widow of the diseased outlaw. No record of this suit ever actually occurring exists and there is no evidence of Eva actually marrying John. The article also claimed that she had married John Ellis, who played the part of John in the Evans and Sontag drama. No record of this marriage or any divorce exists. It had also been reported that Eva had paid a visit to William Fredericks in jail shortly before his execution. After the authorities figured out that the visitor had been Eva Evans, Fredericks cell was quickly searched. They discovered a small hole bored into the wall of the cell and afterwards forbid anyone else from visiting Fredericks.

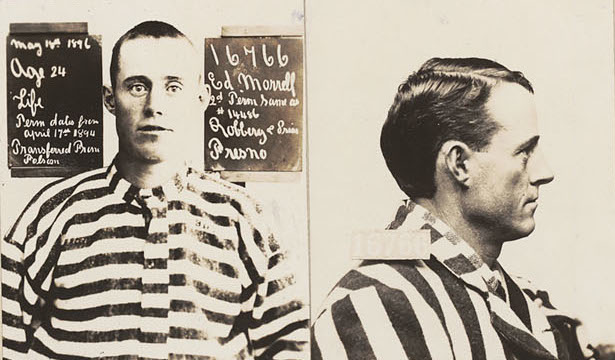
Ed Morrell, San Quentin State Prison, May 1896

While on tour in Oregon in the spring of 1894, the Columbia River had the greatest flood in its recent history and the "White Dramatic Company" was marooned in Heppner for two months. Unable to continue the tour, White and his company received no income so they tried to perform several different productions at the theater in Heppner. Molly and Eva did not receive any pay from White during this time. When the railroad was repaired in July, the Evans and Sontag Combination slowly disbanded, with Molly and Eva leaving for California in August. While on the trip home from Oregon, Eva almost lost her life when a friend of John Ellis, named Whetstone, tried to rape her. While waiting for the train to Portland at Heppner Junction near the Columbia River, Whetstone asked Eva if she wanted to view the Columbia in the moonlight. While they walked, the man threw his arms around Eva and threw her down onto the tracks. Just then a train started down the tracks and Eva barely escaped being run over, but the train saved her from being violated by Whetstone. A lynch mob was organized at the station house, but they never found the man and Eva never heard of him again.

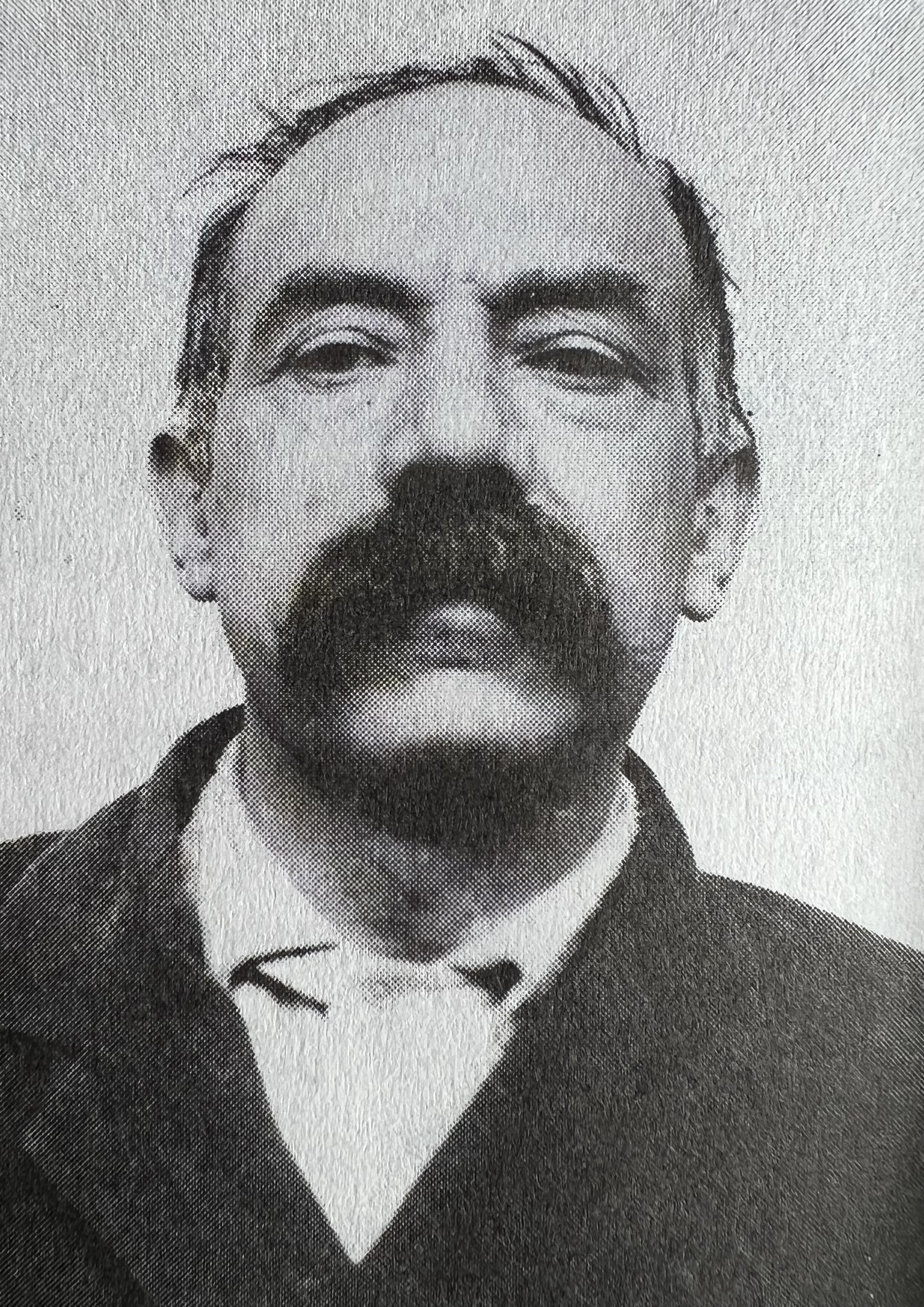
Josiah "Si" Lovern, after his arrest for his connection to the 1896 Tagus train robbery.

After the failed Oregon tour, Molly and Eva moved back to Visalia. Molly began to work in laundry and in packing houses, while Eva picked fruit in local orchards. A local priest helped the family by providing Ynez and Winifred with a free education at a Los Angeles convent for orphans and half-orphans. The priest also provided the Evans boys with a free education at a boarding school in Watsonville. The youngest Carl, had fallen off the back porch at Grandmother Byrd's and became handicapped for life by a raised up vertebra.

Even with the death of John Sontag, the imprisonment of George Contant and Chris Evans, and the death of most of the Dalton Gang, robberies of Southern Pacific trains in the San Joaquin Valley continued. In March 1896, woodcutter's, Dan McCall and Obie Britt, decided to rob a Southern Pacific train just north of Tulare. Britt soon lost his nerve and decided to inform Tulare County Sheriff A. P. Merritt of the impending robbery. The sheriff told Britt to go along with McCall's plans, informed the Southern Pacific Railroad, and formed a posse to ambush the robbers during the heist.

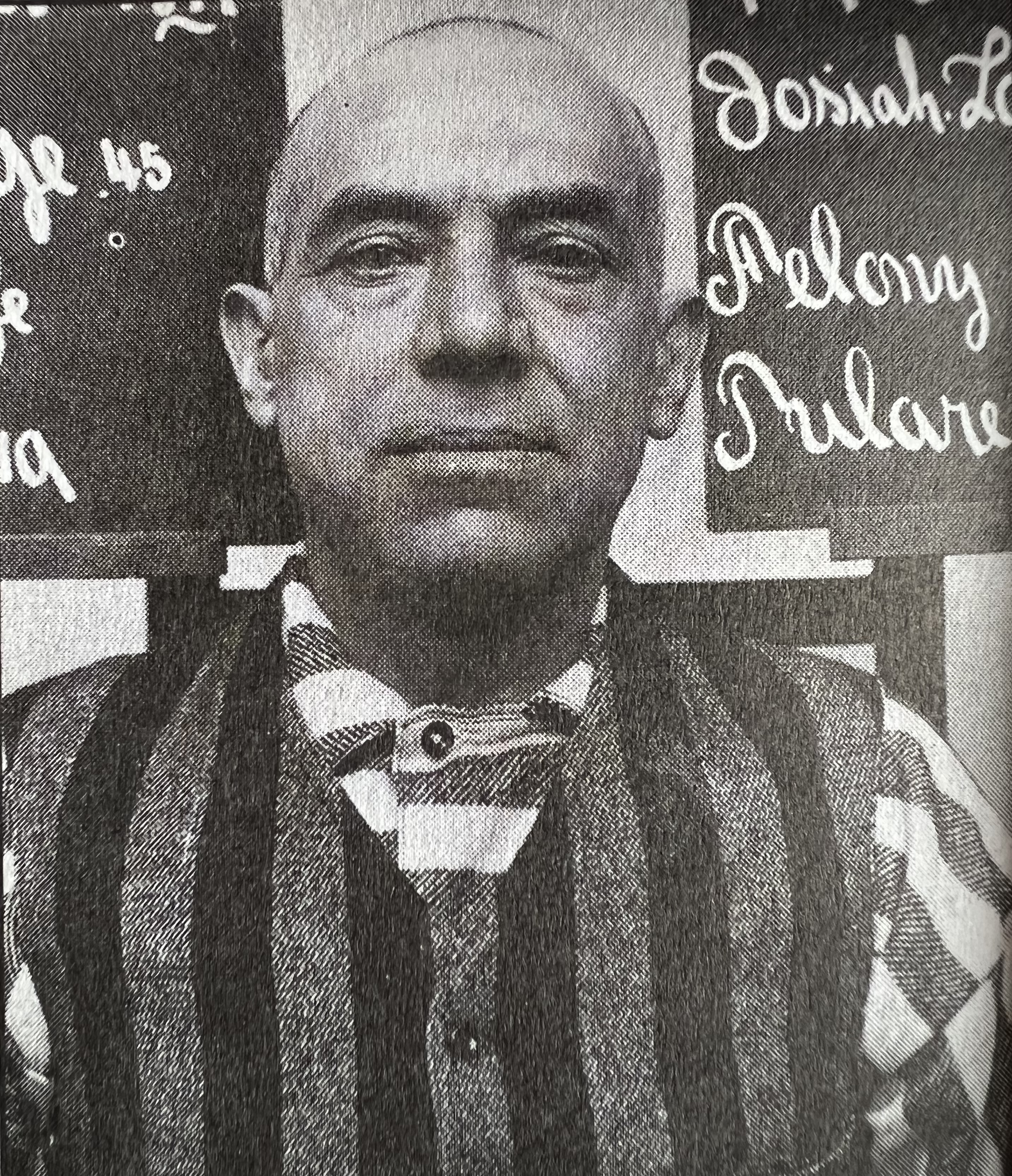
Josiah "Si" Lovern, during his entry into San Quentin Prison, December 28, 1897.

The robbery was planned to occur on March 19, at two in the morning, just north of Tulare, at Tagus Switch. McCall, however, began to feel uneasy and changed targets, deciding to instead rob a train heading south from Goshen. McCall climbed aboard one side of the train and expected Britt to climb along the other. Britt, however, was able to remain behind without McCall noticing. While robbing the southbound train, McCall encountered two deputies on their way to meet the rest of the sheriff's posse. McCall was able to wound both deputies, but a charge of buckshot blew him off the moving train.

Shortly afterward, Chris Evans' old friend, Si Lovern, and Lovern's business partner, Charles Ardell, were arrested and charged with train robbery. Lovern's horse and buggy had been found tied near the scene of the holdup and he was accused of providing getaway transportation for the robbers. McCall was also using a rifle owned by Lovern and he was accused of providing weapons for the heist as well. Lovern argued that he owned many weapons and kept them in his saloon. Many had been sold to him in exchange for drinks, and he claimed that he often lent them to anyone that needed them. Britt even testified that Lovern played no part in their plans. Still, there was animosity held by the Southern Pacific toward Lovern; he had furnished the guns that were used in George Contant's prison break attempt, his saloon was a haven for known criminals, and it was suspected by officers that he had served as a "fence" for Evans and Sontag. Ardell was acquitted, but Lovern was sentenced to life in prison and sent to San Quentin on December 28, 1897. He was paroled on March 1, 1910, and would die in Visalia in 1937 at age 86.

The last train robbery in Tulare County was committed by brothers Ben and Dudley Johnson, better known as the "Tulare Twins". The two brothers had previously spent thirty days in the Tulare County Jail during 1891 for stealing a horse from F.H. Wales, during which they shared a cell with Grat Dalton. Afterwards they committed a series of crimes in the area and remained wanted men. On September 6, the twins held up a train near Sacramento with a man named Frank Morgan, who was killed during the robbery. Learning their lesson from Morgan's death, they carefully planned their next robbery. This occurred two miles north of Goshen, at Cross Creek, on March 22, 1898. The Johnson twins escorted the engineer and fireman to the messenger car and used dynamite to blow the car and the safe, securing several thousands of dollars. The Southern Pacific and Wells Fargo offered rewards of $1,000 for the arrest of each robber, but the twins escaped to Orange City, Florida. Dudley Johnson would be killed in Orange City during a shootout, but his brother Ben would escape and eventually disappear.

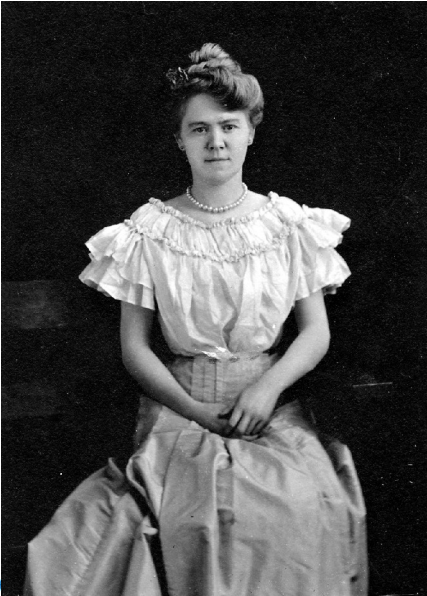
Eva Evans Cribbs, 1900

Due to a back injury Eva Evans had sustained during a performance in Oakland, she had been prescribed Morphine to deal with the pain. Becoming severely depressed, Eva decided to save up on the pills until she had enough to "open the door...". Molly found Eva in a comma and shook her into consciousness. It was months before she would fully recover.

In the spring of 1897, Molly brought all the boys back to Visalia after they had begged to come home. The priest who had helped them paid to have an old home moved onto a lot the family still owned in front of their old place. Together, things began to slowly improve for the family.

After a recommendation from her doctor, Eva moved to Portland in 1898 where she married a man named Albert F. Cribbs. Ynez and Winifred finished school in Los Angeles and were invited by the poet Joaquin Miller to stay in one of the cottages at his Oakland hills estate, "The Hights". Carl was sent to the Children's Hospital in San Francisco after Molly felt she could no longer adequately take care of him. When he was visited by his sisters and complained to them about the hospital, Winifred snuck him out and took him to Miller's estate in Oakland.

In 1901, Molly was able to sell the Redwood Ranch to the US Government and with the money moved her sons and her to Portland. The Redwood Ranch property is still part of the Sequoia National Forest today. Chris was pleased to hear that the ancient grove of Redwood trees on their property would be protected from the poachers that were destroying so many other trees.

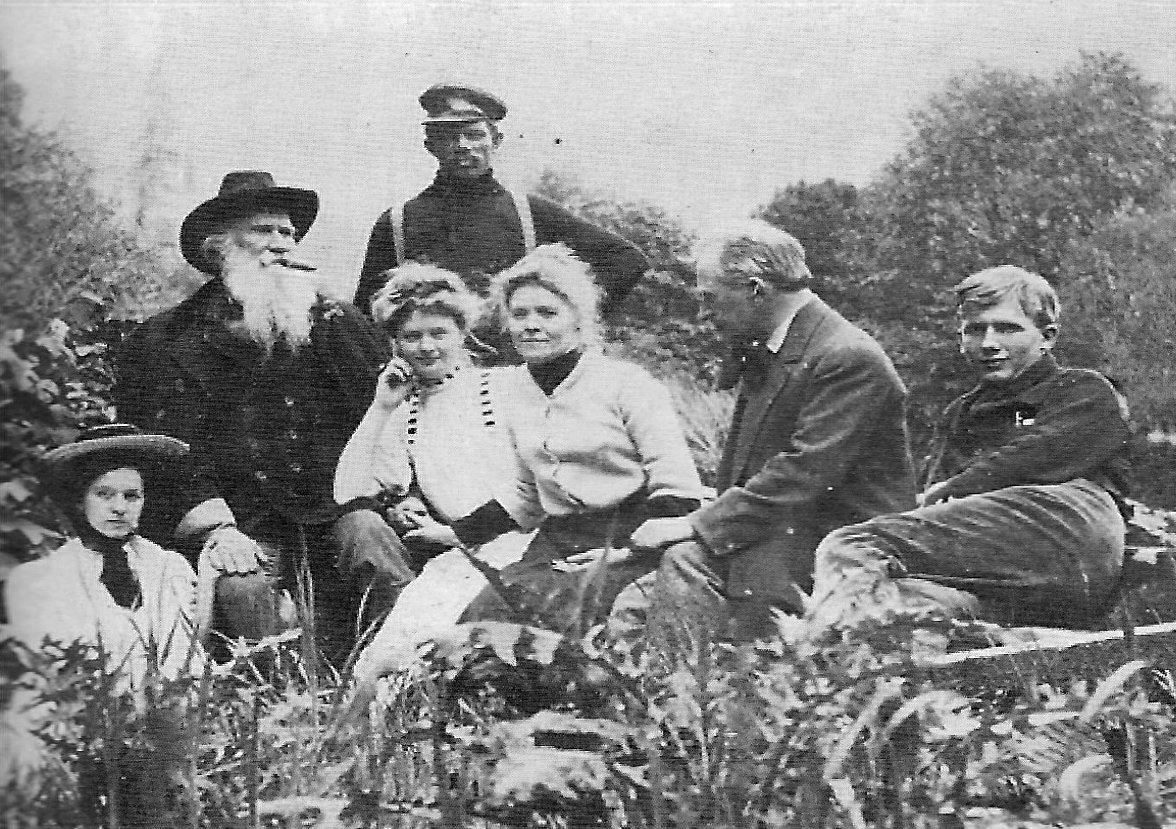
Taken during Joaquin Miller's visit to Eva and Ynez in Oregon, (left to right) Dolly Davis, Joaquin Miller, Ynez Evans Mason, Eva Evans Cribbs, Norris Jensen, Perry McCullough, with the boatman standing in the back, 1908.

Winifred, Ynez, and Carl moved to Portland to join the rest of the family. At twenty years old, Winifred married a man named Walter Burrell and had a child. Like Eva's marriage to Cribbs, this marriage went unrecorded. By 1904, Winifred had moved to Sacramento and remarried. Ynez also married while in Portland, taking the name of Mason, but not much is known about this marriage as it ended shortly after.

Chris Evans had applied for parole in 1901 but was denied. Once Winifred was in Sacramento, she began a more organized effort to secure her fathers release. Following a visit to the Evans family in Oregon in 1905, Joaquin Miller wrote a letter to the governor to see if he might meet with one or two of the Evans children, but had little effect. Winifred then went to Fresno County in 1906 to obtain letters of support for a petition to the governor. She obtained letters from jury foreman J. N. Reese, deputy district attorney Alva Snow, and even former Fresno County Sheriff Jay Scott, who recommended clemency and commutation of Chris’ sentence. When Winifred presented her plea to Governor Pardee in person she was denied.

While living with Winifred in 1907, Eva worked with professional photographer Grace Hubley in Sacramento for several months. In 1908, with both of their early failed marriages, Eva and Ynez decided to move to Marshfield, Oregon (now Coos Bay, Oregon), to open their own photography studio.

While many had suspected that Chris Evans would try to take revenge on George Sontag in Folsom, nothing ever came of it. The two only had one interaction while in prison.

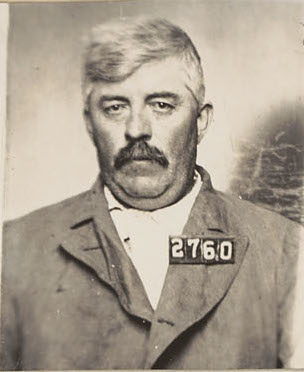
George C. Contant, taken when he was released from Folsom Prison in 1908.

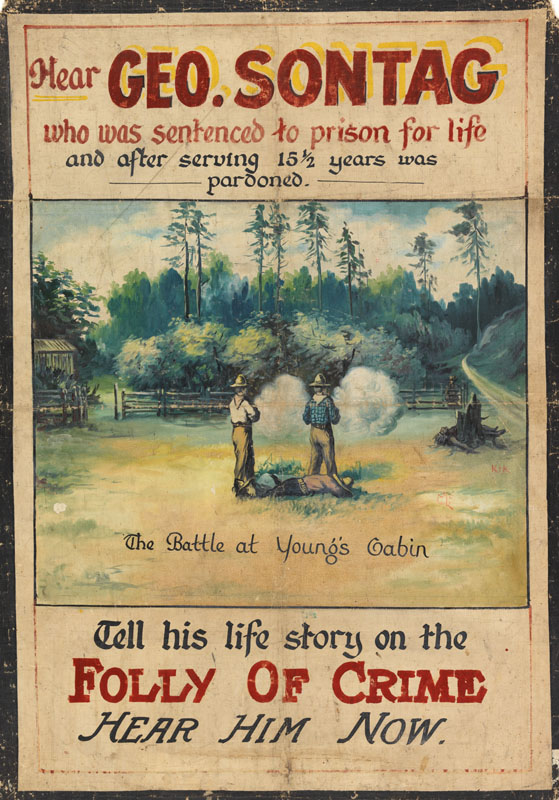
Poster advertising a lecture by George Sontag (Contant), 1910.

Even though George was permitted to visit his family once a month in Sacramento, in November 1897, George's eldest son was run over by a switch engine in the railyard while on his way to the store running a morning errand. George had talked to Warden Aull about obtaining parole and the warden recommended that he seek signatures for a petition to be sent to the governor. Then in January 1899, George's wife passed from an illness that had been kept secret from him. His remaining son went to live with his grandparents in Mankato and George went into a deep depression.

That fall, Warden Aull died. He had been a friend to both Chris Evans and George Contant, and both felt that with his passing they had little chance of gaining parole. Warden Wilkinson took Aull's place, and after an attempted breakout in 1903, the straitjacket was introduced. According to George, the situation became grim. Leather that had previously been used to make shoes was now used for trunks and harnesses, and several prisoners were left to walk barefoot.

Warden Wilkinson was then replaced by Archibald Yell. George claimed that the situation became even worse when guards began to murder prisoners, shooting them down as they came and went from work. The guards would claim that the prisoners had attempted to escape or take control of vital prison areas.

When George Contant wrote to the Governor regarding the promises that had been made by the railroad to eventually secure George's parole, he was told that Warden Aull had lost the paperwork. Governor Pardee would not grant George's parole, but in July 1907 the Prison Board of Director took action on the governor's behalf. George Contant would be released on March 19, 1908, after sixteen years at Folsom. He moved to San Bernardino and started up a painting business and wrote a book about his life called A Pardoned Lifer. He then traveled the country, giving lectures in which he denounced a life of crime. The following year, George married Alice Brown of Thorntown, Indiana. He then founded his own film company in 1911 and released a movie in 1915 based on the Evans-Sontag gang called The Folly of a Life of Crime. George's second wife died on July 24, 1928, from a heart attack. After his mother passed in 1929, he disappeared from the public eye. When or where George died remains a mystery.

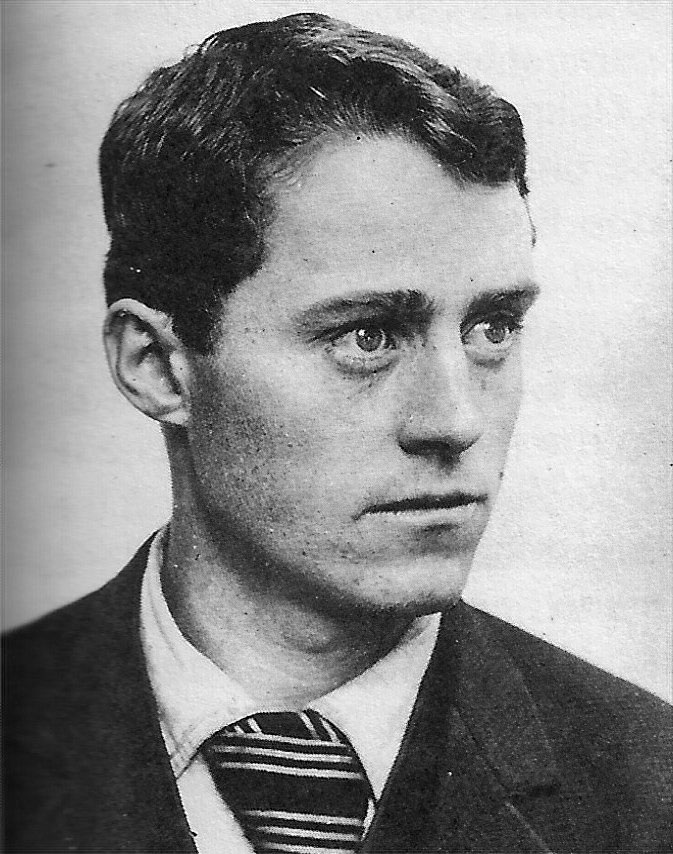
Ed Morrell, after his release from prison, around 1908.

Ed Morrell had also been released from prison in 1908 and his story became legendary. Morrell had been transferred to San Quentin in 1896 and sentenced to hard labor in the jute mill. Following an attempted escape in 1899, Morrell was confined to solitary confinement for four years and seven months. He later explained that he kept himself sane by communicating with another solitary by tapping on the wall of his nine by four and a half foot cell. After spending time in solitary, Morrell became a model prisoner and eventually worked to secure his release. He claimed to the prison parole board that his decision to help Evans had partly been because of his love for Eva. After his release he would meet author Jack London who inspired Morrell to write a book of his experiences. Morrell published his memoir The 25th Man: The Strange Story of Ed. Morrell in 1924 and became a minor character in Jack London's book The Star Rover. Morrell would later pass away in 1946, at the age of 78, in Los Angeles.

The release of Evans’ former confederates gave hope to the Evans family that their father would be released from prison. It was noted by many however, including George Contant upon his release, that Chris bragged about his time as an outlaw, denying that he had ever robbed a train, and said he only killed in self defense and because of this he would most likely spend the remainder of his life behind bars.

The same year George Contant and Ed Morrell were released from prison, Ynez married a prominent businessman named Norris Jensen. Eva also married a man named Perry McCullough who had recently moved to Marshfield with his brother to start a moving picture theater. The two had married in Canada, since Eva was still legally married to Albert Cribbs in the United States even though he was long out of the picture. Winifred had also remarried some years earlier, to a man named Adalberto “Albert” Gutierrez in Sacramento.

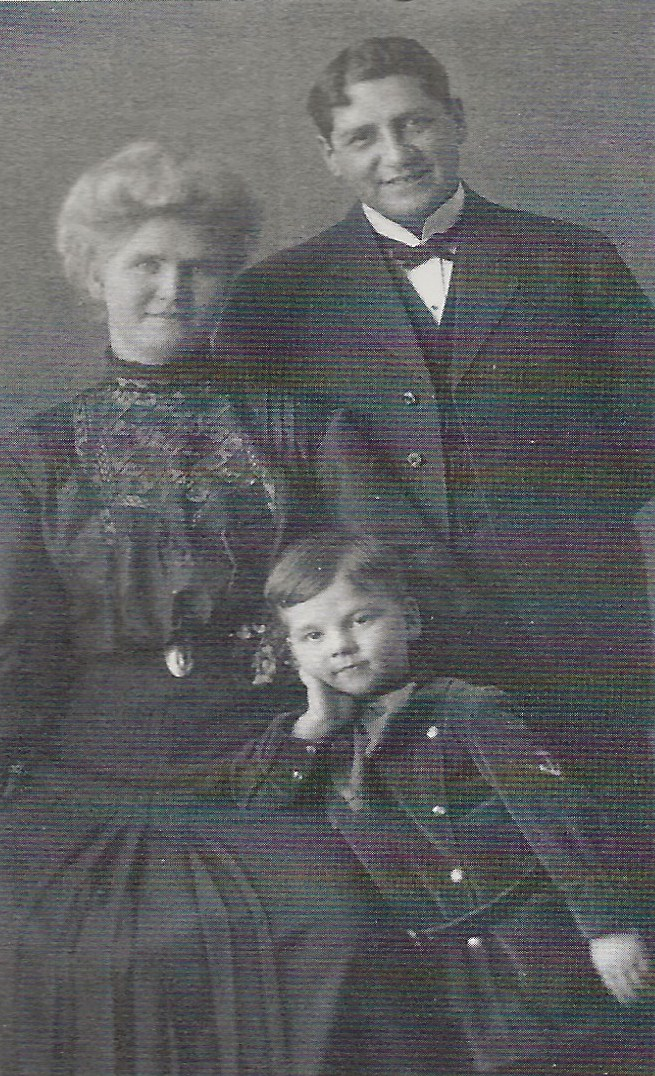
Winifred Evans Burrell, with her second husband, Albert Gutierrez, and her son, William Burrell.

While living in Spokane, Washington, Eva's husband Perry developed tuberculosis and it was recommended by his doctor that the couple move to a warmer climate. Eva and Perry first moved to Arizona, and then later to Los Angeles in 1910.

Winifred's husband Albert promised the prison parole board that he could secure Chris employment on his farm east of Sacramento if the latter was released. Hope had also become renewed for Chris with the election of Republican Hiram Johnson for California Governor in 1911. Johnson had been supported by a group of Progressives within the party who pledged to free California of the dreaded “Octopus”, the railroad monopoly of the Southern Pacific. The Evans family hoped that the anti-railroad governor would pardon Chris.

A month after Hiram Johnson's election, he was presented with letters of support and other materials pleading for Evans release. Chris had also been suffering from rheumatism and his health had declined severely. Hiram Johnson decided to grant Evans parole so he could have what time was left with his family but, according to the conditions of his release, Chris was to leave California immediately and to not return.

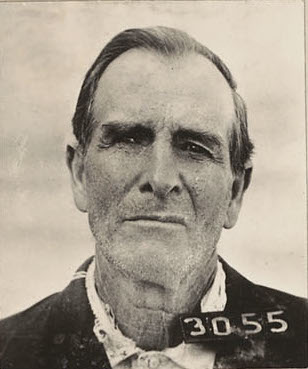
Chris Evans, during his release from Folsom Prison on May 1, 1911.

Chris’ release from prison made headlines throughout the state. Winifred sat waiting for him at the gate. Eva could not leave Los Angeles, as Perry's illness had relapsed and she had to find work in a cafeteria to sustain them. In a letter to Eva, and in interviews with reporters waiting for him at the gate, Chris said that he was going to Portland to be with his wife and sons. After Chris reunited with Winifred, he climbed into the passenger seat of his youngest daughter's automobile, the first he had ever seen. Media reporters chased the Evans party for about 30 miles in an attempt to get Chris’ picture. The former outlaw gripped his seat tightly for fear of being jostled by the impact of motion, but he later joked that he enjoyed the final "manhunt".

Chris and Winifred stopped off in Oakland on their way to Oregon and paid a visit to Joaquin Miller. Although Miller was badly ill, he got out of his sick bed to take a picture with Chris, which appeared on the front page of the San Francisco Star. Eva had begun working at a photo studio in Los Angeles, and was able to take just enough days off to visit her father in Portland. Chris sat in the back garden talking to Eva for hours on end, refusing to stay in the house as he could not get enough of the sun and sky.

When Eva returned home to Los Angeles, she was able to buy a lot on the east side of town where it was drier and would be better for Perry's illness. They put a tent on the property and were not able to afford a real home for many years. During this time, Eva became intensely concerned for the injustices endured by the working poor. One day, Eva read an article by the famous anarchist speaker, Emma Goldman. Perry encouraged Eva to attend one of her lectures, but was too sick to go himself. Eva waited around after one of Emma's famous lectures and introduced herself as the daughter of the famous outlaw, Chris Evans. Goldman remembered hearing of Chris Evans, and invited Eva to her apartment for supper and to meet several other anarchists. Eva considered her the most intelligent woman she ever met.

Eva and Perry would become regular guests at Emma's gatherings, getting to know her close circle of friends and associates, including Ben Reitman and Alexander Berkman. The couple even brought Winifred's son, William Burrell, with them and he helped sell books on the lecture floor.

While in the prison library, Chris had been working on his own book but, unlike George Contant or Ed Morrell, it was not an autobiography on his life or a diatribe against the Southern Pacific or the prison system. Instead he outlined and created the blueprint for a social utopia in a small book he entitled, Eurasia. Three years after his release from prison, he was finally able to publish it. The book was heavily based on Looking Backward, by Edward Bellamy, which influenced the formation of the Nationalist political movement and several utopian communities during the 1890s.

One of these utopian communities influenced by Bellamy's book was the Kaweah Co-Operative Colony, of which Chris was very familiar. In an interview following his capture at Stone Corral, Evans claimed that he had known several anarchists at the Kaweah Colony which was located near Evans’ Redwood Ranch from 1885 to 1890. Chris and the Kaweah Colony had a common enemy, as the Southern Pacific was part of the behind the scenes political maneuvering that led to the colony's land becoming part of Sequoia National Park in 1890.

In Evans' book, an aristocratic insomniac wakes up on a boat off the coast of Boston, Massachusetts, in the year 2000. He finds a futuristic America that operates under a system of state socialism. Cooperation has replaced competition, private property has been abolished, and all share equally in the wealth of the nation. Eva felt that there were many reforms in her fathers book that Emma Goldman would appreciate. She wrote to Goldman and asked if she would send her father tickets to one of her upcoming lectures in Portland, which Chris attended in August 1915.

A year prior, in 1914, Evans had been granted permission by the prison parole board to travel to Sacramento to ask Governor Johnson for a full pardon. His request was denied. Evans' health was poor and he feared he would never see his older daughter again, so he risked violating his parole by making one last trip to Los Angeles.

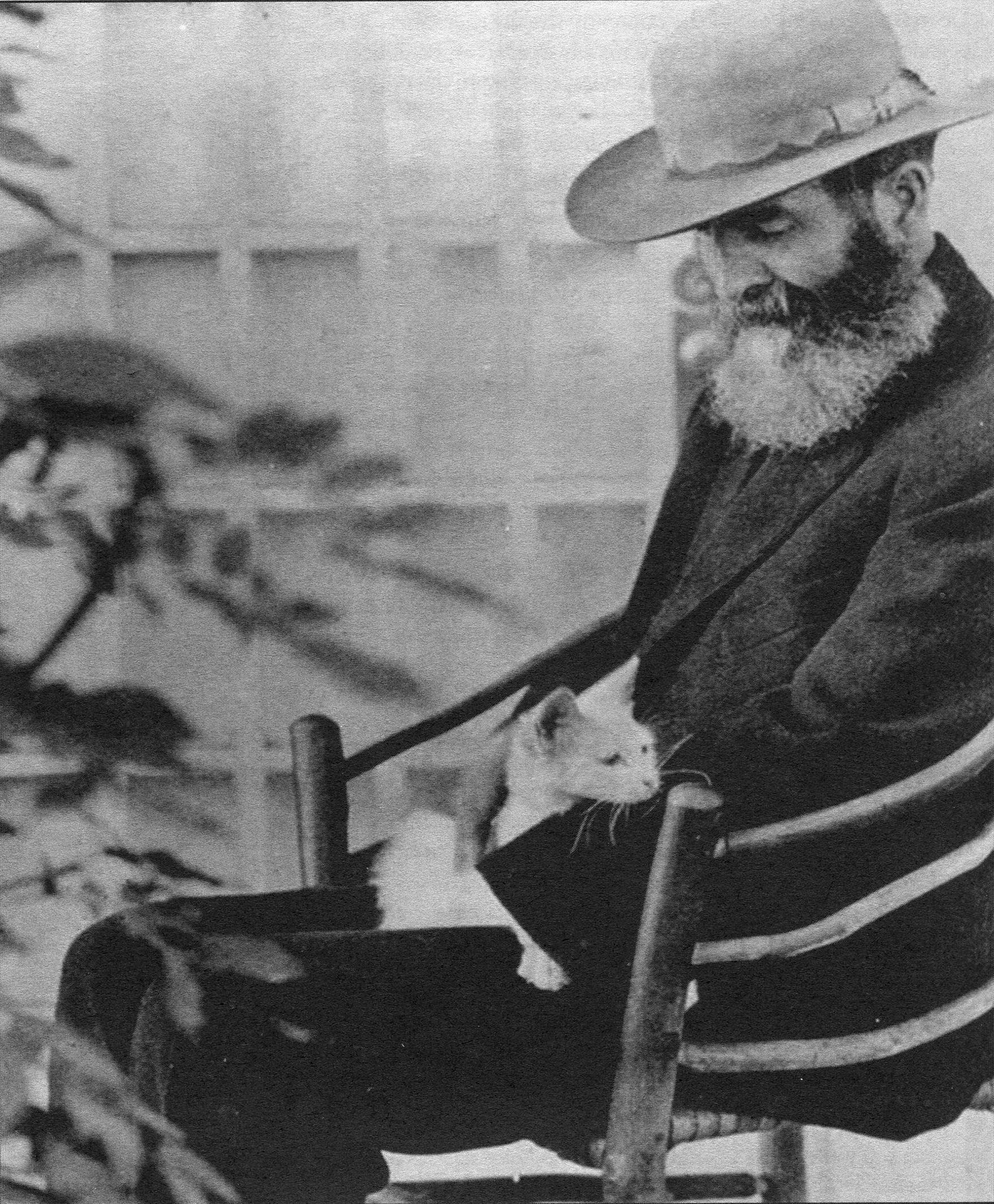
Chris Evans at the home of his daughter, Eva Evans McCullough, in Los Angeles, 1914.

Eva came home one day to find her father sitting on his suitcase by her backdoor. Chris was so ill that she decided to take him to the doctor. Eva expected her father to stay with her until she could nurse him back to health, but he soon received a letter from the parole board telling him to report to a deputy parole officer in Los Angeles immediately so he could be shipped back to Portland. Eva pleaded with the officer to let him stay, but her father was put on a boat that afternoon.

When he returned to Portland, a doctor finally removed the buckshot that had been embedded in Chris’ skull since Stone Corral. The painful and consistent headaches finally disappeared, but he still suffered from palsy and rheumatism. In January 1917, Chris’ health was failing rapidly and he was committed to the Multnomah County Poor Farm in Portland. His son Joseph picked him up, after hearing in the newspaper a month later that his father had been committed, and brought him to Vincent's Hospital. Chris Evans died at the age of 69, on February 9, 1917, at 10:30PM.

== Legacy ==
Morris Ankrum and John Smith portrayed Evans and Sontag, respectively, in an episode of the 1955 syndicated television series Stories of the Century, starring and hosted by Jim Davis. Jimmie Dodd of The Mickey Mouse Club appears as a deputy in this episode.

== Gallery ==
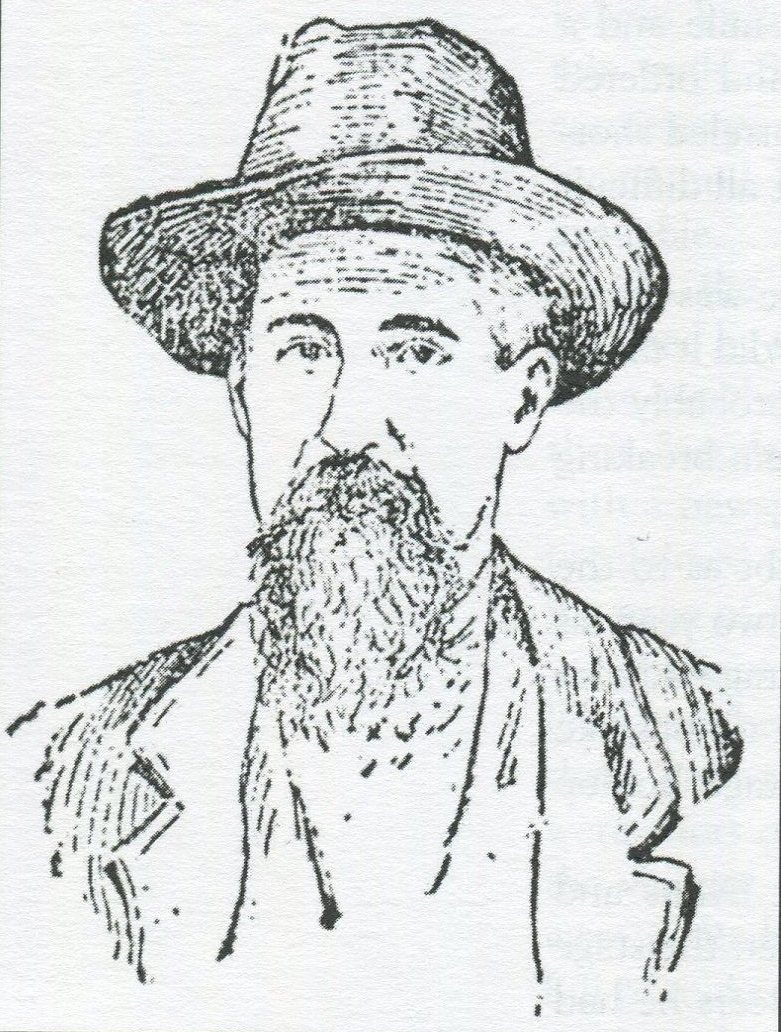
Deputy Marshal Samuel Black

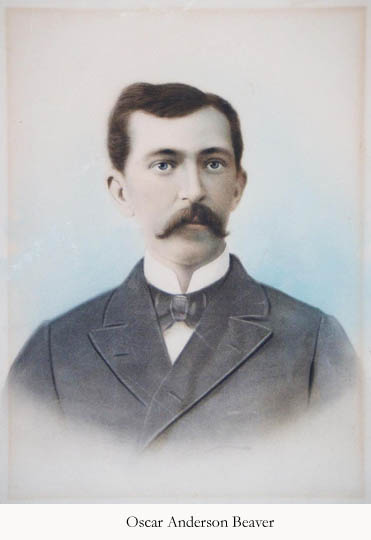
Oscar Anderson Beaver

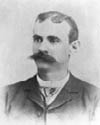
Deputy US Marshal Vernon Coke Wilson

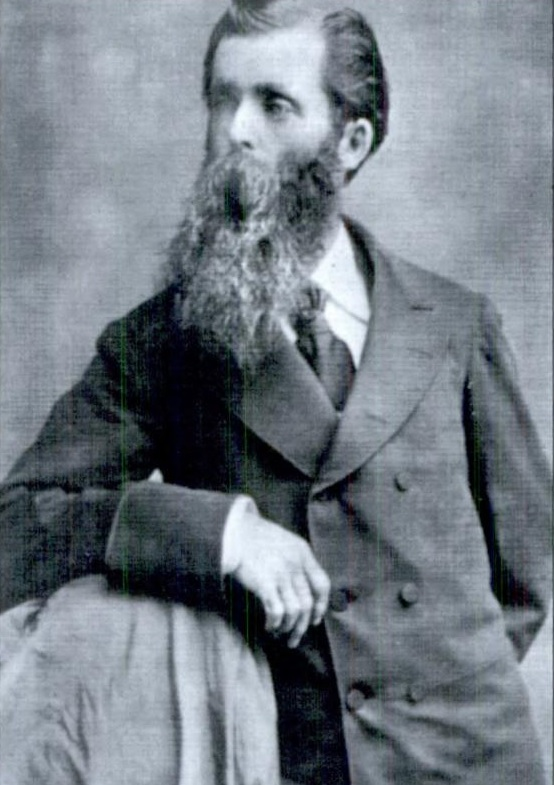
Folsom Prison Warden Charles Aull

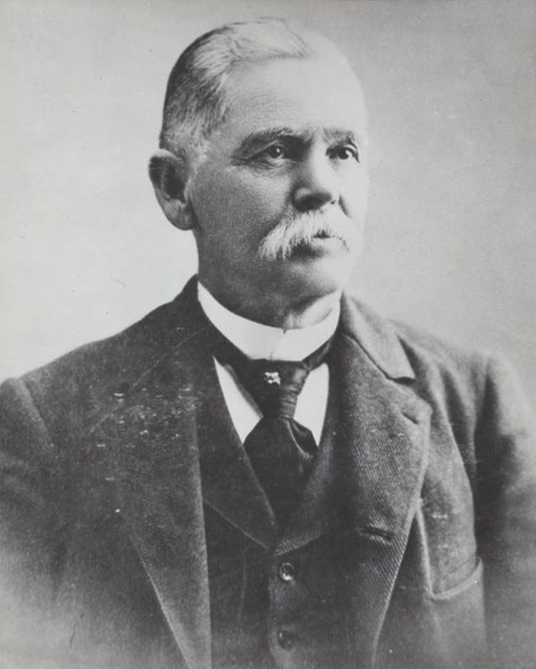
John N. Thacker in 1868 while Sheriff of Humboldt County

== Books ==
- Prodigal Sons: The Adventures of Christopher Evans and John Sontag, By Wallace Smith, the Christopher Publishing House, Boston, U.S.A., c. 1951.
- Bandits and the Southern Pacific by Carl Burgess Glasscock, Frederick A. Stokes, New York, c. 1929.
- The 25th Man: The Strange Story of Ed. Morrell, the Hero of Jack London's Star Rover, New Era Publishing Co., 1924.
- Train Robbers Daughter: The Melodramatic Life of Eva Evans, Raven River Press, c. 2008
- A Pardoned Lifer: Life of Geoorge Sontag, The Index Print, c. 1909
