= George Contant =

American outlaw (1864–1930)

George C. Contant
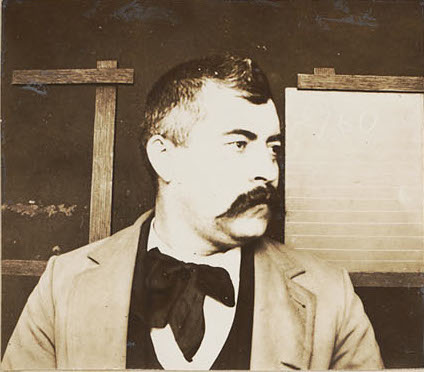
- Born: April 10, 1864; Mankato, Minnesota, US
- Died: 1930 (aged 65–66)
- Occupation: Reformed outlaw
- Spouse(s): Therese Landgraff [1887-1898] Alice Brown Warbinton (1913-1928)
- Relatives: Brother John Sontag

George C. Contant, aka George Sontag (April 10, 1864 – 1930), was an outlaw of the American West known mostly for train robberies. Like his older brother, John Sontag, he was originally from Mankato, Minnesota.

== Background ==
Contant was the younger of two sons of Jacob Contant and the former Maria Bohn. After the death of their father in 1867, John Sontag took the surname of his stepfather, Matthias Sontag, his mother's second husband, a veteran of the Union Army during the American Civil War. George Contant however kept the original name though the two were usually called The Sontag Brothers. The two were frequent partners in crime. After he stole cigars from an employer, George Contant was sent to reform school in St. Paul, Minnesota. After a subsequent conviction for theft, Contant was imprisoned at the Nebraska State Penitentiary in Lincoln. Contant married Therese Landgraff on October 11, 1887, in La Crosse, Wisconsin; they had at least one child, George Contant.

== Crime and punishment ==
With his brother imprisoned in Nebraska, John Sontag came to Fresno, California, and began working for the Southern Pacific Transportation Company. After an industrial accident, he was employed near Visalia, California, by a farmer and livery stable operator, who soon became his partner in crime, Christopher "Chris" Evans.

After Contant was released from prison in Lincoln, he joined his brother in a train robbery near Racine, Wisconsin, on November 12, 1891, that was very successful. He then joined Chris Evans on a trip to Minnesota, where on July 1, 1892, they attempted to rob a train while riding along the Minnesota River between St. Peter and Kasota. They acquired nothing of much value, but their crime aroused the concern of Pinkerton detectives. A month later, back in California, the trio robbed a train at Collis, now Kerman in Fresno County. This time, they acquired $500 and bags of Mexican and Peruvian coins of no apparent value. Several days after the robbery, law-enforcement officers arrested Contant in connection with the crime, but Sontag and Evans fled as fugitives. A nationally-publicized manhunt culminated in what is known as the Battle of Stone Corral.

Found guilty of train robbery at Collis in October 1892, Contant was incarcerated for fifteen years at Folsom State Prison. The following June 1893, John Sontag died shortly after his 32nd birthday either of gunshot wounds sustained at the Battle of Stone Corral and/or tetanus while in custody in Fresno. Chris Evans lost an eye and his left arm preceding his surrender. He too was sent to Folsom, where he remained for seventeen years . Evans was paroled in 1911 and died in 1917. George Contant tried to escape in 1893.

== After prison ==
After his release from prison, George Contant wrote an autobiography, A Pardoned Lifer, in 1909 with Opie L. Warner as the ghostwriter. He spoke out against the danger of living outside the law. His many lecture appearances brought him to Milwaukee, Wisconsin; Minneapolis; and, in his hometown, the Mankato Opera House.

In 1912 Contant applied for a US Passport. On June 28, 1913, Contant married Alice Brown Warbinton in San Francisco. About 1915, Contant produced a film, The Folly of a Life of Crime. There are no remaining copies. Alice Conant died in 1928. George Contant's last whereabouts are unknown. He was listed in May 1929 in the obituary of his mother as a surviving son residing in San Francisco.
