= Kerman, California =

City in California, United States

- City
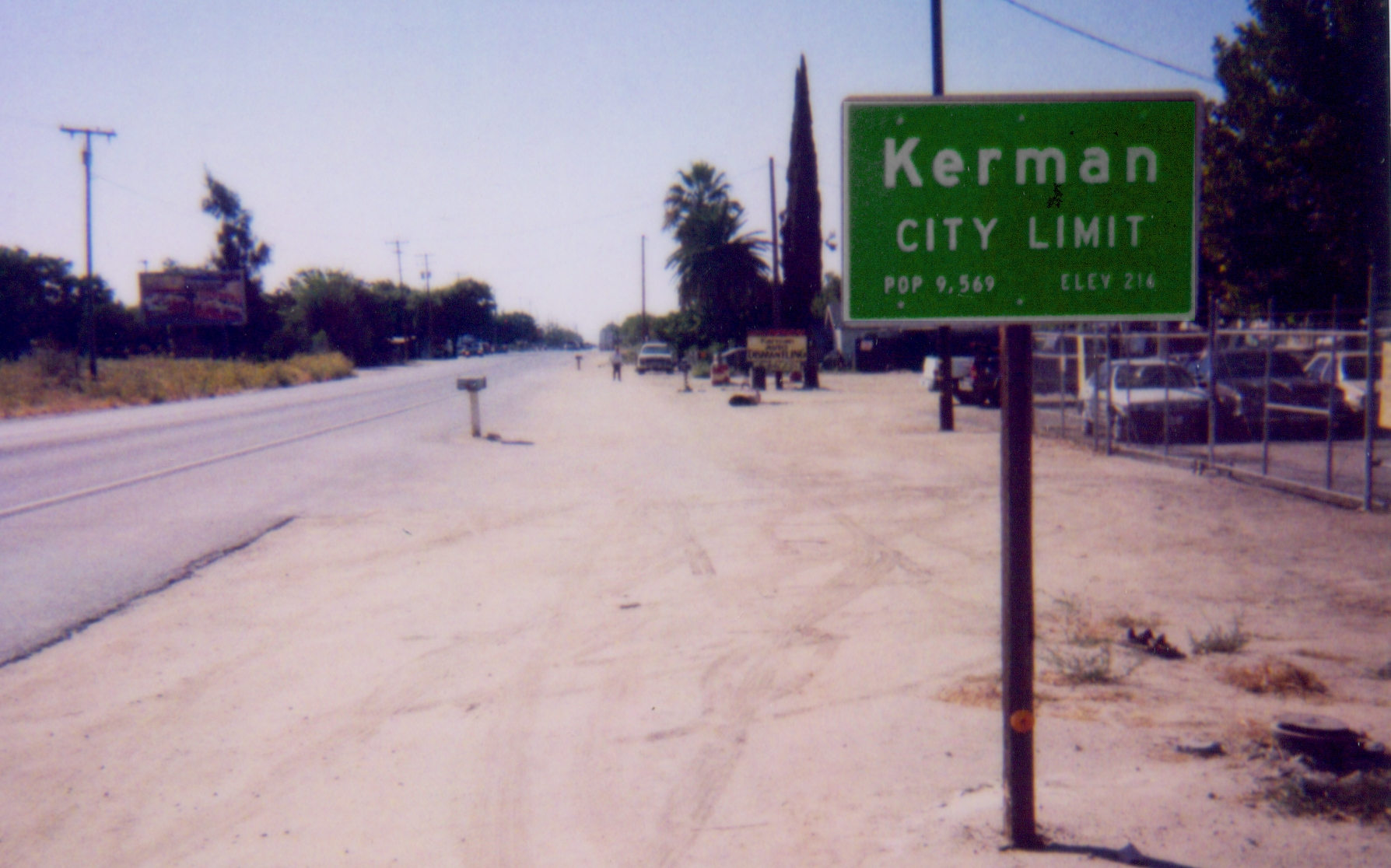
- Kerman's eastern city limit at SR-180

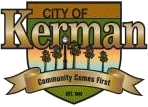
- Seal
- Motto: Community Comes First
- Interactive map of Kerman, California
- Location in the United States
- Coordinates: 36°43′25″N 120°03′36″W
- Country: United States
- State: California
- County: Fresno
- Incorporated: July 2, 1946

Government
  - Mayor: Maria Pacheco
  - State Senator: Anna Caballero (D)
  - State Assembly: Esmeralda Soria (D)
  - U. S. Congress: Adam Gray (D)

Area
  - Total: 3.27 sq mi (8.46 km^{2})
  - Land: 3.27 sq mi (8.46 km^{2})
  - Water: 0 sq mi (0.00 km^{2}) 0%
- Elevation: 220 ft (67 m)

Population (2020)
  - Total: 16,016
  - Density: 4,900/sq mi (1,890/km^{2})
- Time zone: UTC-08:00 (PST)
  - Summer (DST): UTC-07:00 (PDT)
- ZIP code: 93630
- Area code: 559
- FIPS code: 06-38226
- GNIS feature IDs: 1658895, 2411536
- Website: www.cityofkerman.gov

Kerman (formerly Collis) is a city at the intersection of State Route 180 and State Route 145 in Fresno County, California, United States. The population was 16,016 at the 2020 census. Kerman is located 15 miles (24 km) west of Fresno, at an elevation of 220 feet (67 m).

== History ==
Around 1891, the Southern Pacific Railroad constructed a new line between Tracy and Fresno. A watering tank and pump on that line was the beginning of Kerman, which was christened Collis in honor of the President of the railroad, Collis Potter Huntington. The first inhabitant, the caretaker of the pump and tank, kept the tank full of water for the thirsty engines with their long and lumbering trains. After some months, he resigned his job, not because of the work, he said, but because it was too lonesome and he was tired of being a hermit. He said he never saw anyone but the train crews and they were always in too big a hurry to carry on a conversation.

On August 3, 1892, the train bandits Chris Evans, John Sontag, and George Contant robbed a Southern Pacific train at Collis. Contant went to Folsom State Prison for the crime. Evans and John Sontag became fugitives for ten months before they were captured in 1893 in what is called the Battle of Stone Corral. John Sontag died of his wounds in custody, and Chris Evans was also sent to Folsom upon his conviction of the crime.

As a speculative investment, the Bank of California purchased large areas of land in every county in California. The bank considered the dry, barren land around Kerman a promising investment, and it became the land allocated to Fresno County

After the death of its promoter, the bank became insolvent and its property was liquidated. The property here attracted the attention of two Los Angeles capitalists, William G. Kerckhoff and Jacob Mansar, who saw a chance to purchase a plentiful water supply from the newly constructed Enterprise Canal, which had its source in the Kings River. The men combined the first three letters of each of their names and christened the area "Kerman." They pitched the property to Scandinavians and Germans settled in the Midwest.

The Collis post office was opened in 1894, closed in 1899, re-established in 1904, and renamed Kerman in 1906. Kerman incorporated in 1946. The independent Kerman Telephone company retired its four-position manual telephone switchboard, described by a state telephone association as the last of its kind in California, in 1991.

== Geography ==
According to the United States Census Bureau, the city has a total area of 3.2 square miles (8.3 km^{2}), all land.

== Demographics ==
Historical population
Census	Pop.	Note	%±
1950	1,563		—
1960	1,970		26.0%
1970	2,667		35.4%
1980	4,002		50.1%
1990	5,448		36.1%
2000	8,551		57.0%
2010	13,544		58.4%
2020	16,016		18.3%
2024 (est.)	17,497	▲	9.2%
U.S. Decennial Census

=== 2020 census ===
As of the 2020 census, Kerman had a population of 16,016. The population density was 4,902.4 inhabitants per square mile (1,892.8/km^{2}). The age distribution was 31.7% under the age of 18, 10.7% aged 18 to 24, 27.7% aged 25 to 44, 19.5% aged 45 to 64, and 10.4% aged 65 or older. The median age was 30.4 years. For every 100 females, there were 96.7 males, and for every 100 females age 18 and over, there were 93.2 males age 18 and over.

The census reported that 16,008 people (99.95% of the population) lived in households, and 8 people (0.05%) were institutionalized. 99.9% of residents lived in urban areas, while 0.1% lived in rural areas.

There were 4,418 households, of which 56.1% had children under the age of 18 living in them. Of all households, 55.9% were married-couple households, 8.1% were cohabiting couple households, 12.9% were households with a male householder and no spouse or partner present, and 23.1% were households with a female householder and no spouse or partner present. About 12.3% of all households were made up of individuals and 6.1% had someone living alone who was 65 years of age or older. The average household size was 3.62, and there were 3,686 families (83.4% of all households).

There were 4,512 housing units at an average density of 1,381.1 units per square mile (533.2 units/km^{2}), of which 4,418 (97.9%) were occupied. Of occupied housing units, 58.9% were owner-occupied and 41.1% were occupied by renters. The homeowner vacancy rate was 0.5%, and the rental vacancy rate was 2.2%.

Racial composition as of the 2020 census
Race	Number	Percent
White	4,039	25.2%
Black or African American	99	0.6%
American Indian and Alaska Native	380	2.4%
Asian	1,223	7.6%
Native Hawaiian and Other Pacific Islander	12	0.1%
Some other race	7,101	44.3%
Two or more races	3,162	19.7%
Hispanic or Latino (of any race)	12,522	78.2%

=== 2023 American Community Survey ===
In 2023, the US Census Bureau estimated that 27.0% of the population were foreign-born. Of all people aged 5 or older, 30.9% spoke only English at home, 61.3% spoke Spanish, 4.5% spoke other Indo-European languages, 1.4% spoke Asian or Pacific Islander languages, and 1.8% spoke other languages. Of those aged 25 or older, 60.3% were high school graduates and 14.5% had a bachelor's degree.

The median household income in 2023 was $57,556, and the per capita income was $24,817. About 23.8% of families and 25.3% of the population were below the poverty line.

=== 2010 census ===
At the 2010 census Kerman had a population of 13,544. The population density was 4,189.9 inhabitants per square mile (1,617.7/km^{2}). The racial makeup of Kerman was 6,860 (50.6%) White, 68 (0.5%) African American, 173 (1.3%) Native American, 1,091 (8.1%) Asian, 14 (0.1%) Pacific Islander, 4,675 (34.5%) from other races, and 663 (4.9%) from two or more races. Hispanic or Latino of any race were 9,711 persons (71.7%).

The census reported that 13,537 people (99.9% of the population) lived in households, 2 (0%) lived in non-institutionalized group quarters, and 5 (0%) were institutionalized.

There were 3,692 households, 2,160 (58.5%) had children under the age of 18 living in them, 2,248 (60.9%) were opposite-sex married couples living together, 615 (16.7%) had a female householder with no husband present, 272 (7.4%) had a male householder with no wife present. There were 285 (7.7%) unmarried opposite-sex partnerships, and 25 (0.7%) same-sex married couples or partnerships. 460 households (12.5%) were one person and 208 (5.6%) had someone living alone who was 65 or older. The average household size was 3.67. There were 3,135 families (84.9% of households); the average family size was 3.97.

The age distribution was 4,648 people (34.3%) under the age of 18, 1,469 people (10.8%) aged 18 to 24, 3,870 people (28.6%) aged 25 to 44, 2,580 people (19.0%) aged 45 to 64, and 977 people (7.2%) who were 65 or older. The median age was 28.2 years. For every 100 females, there were 99.6 males. For every 100 females age 18 and over, there were 96.9 males.

There were 3,908 housing units at an average density of 1,209.0 units per square mile (466.8 units/km^{2}), of which 3,692 were occupied, 2,165 (58.6%) by the owners and 1,527 (41.4%) by renters. The homeowner vacancy rate was 3.3%; the rental vacancy rate was 4.9%. 8,215 people (60.7% of the population) lived in owner-occupied housing units and 5,322 people (39.3%) lived in rental housing units.

== Education ==
The Kerman Unified School District is the school district serving Kerman and the surrounding areas. Schools include:

- Kerman High School
- Kerman Middle School
- Enterprise High School (formerly Nova High School)
- Sun Empire Elementary School
- Kerman-Floyd Elementary School
- Goldenrod Elementary School
- Liberty Elementary School
- Harvest Elementary School

Private schools

- Kerman Christian School (on Kerman Covenant Church campus)
- Central Valley Christian Molokan School

== Government ==
In the United States House of Representatives, Kerman is in California's 13th congressional district, represented by Democrat Adam Gray as of January 2025.

== Points of interest ==
- M. Young Botanic Garden

== Sister city relations ==
- Kannami, Shizuoka Prefecture, Japan - since October 12, 1985
