= Kaweah Oaks Preserve =

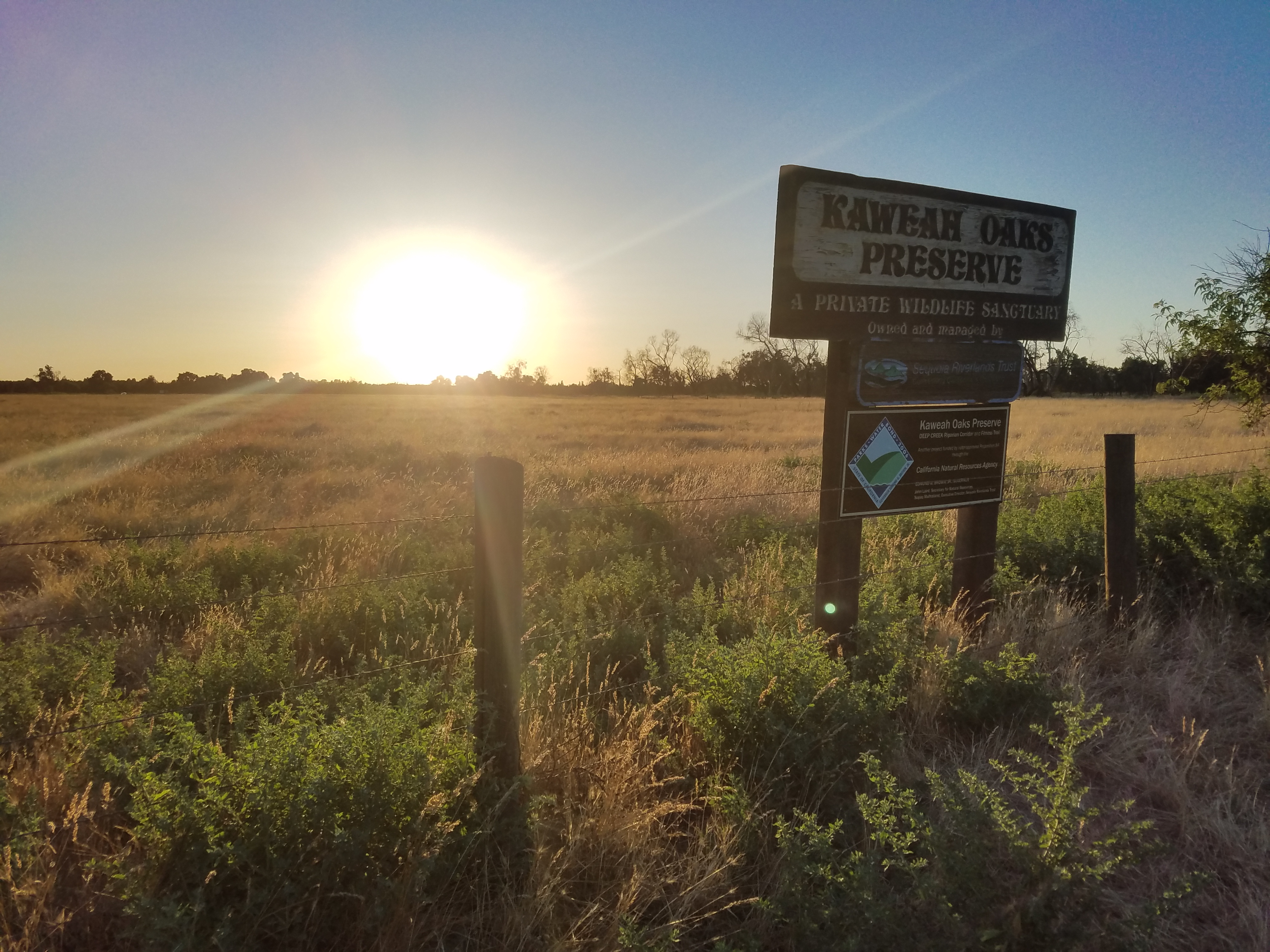
- The sign outside the preserve in Visalia.

- Location within California
- Location: Tulare County, California, United States
- Nearest city: Visalia, CA
- Coordinates: 36°20′10″N 119°10′0″W
- Established: 1983
- Governing body: Sequoia Riverlands Trust
- Website: Sequoia Riverlands Trust

Kaweah Oaks Preserve is located in Tulare County, California east of the city of Visalia not far from the mouth of the Kaweah River near the Venice Hills. The preserve spans 344 acres (139 ha) and is one of the last remaining valley oak riparian forests in the San Joaquin Valley.

== Environment and wildlife ==
A map of the Kaweah Oaks Preserve in Visalia.

Kaweah Oaks Preserve consists of several creeks and ditches: Crocker Cut, Deep Creek, Johnson Slough, Consolidated Peoples Ditch, Outside Creek, and Pennebaker Ditch. The preserve is home to an abundance of wildlife including the gray fox, great horned owl, Nuttall's woodpecker, wild grapevines, willow thickets, and valley oak.

== Restoration project ==
In 1983, local citizens convinced The Nature Conservancy to help purchase the land for its protection After ten years, The Nature Conservancy transferred the title to a local conservation organization. Sequoia Riverlands Trust manages the Kaweah Oaks Preserve.

In 2006, a controlled burn of 40 acres took place at the Preserve, between the People's Ditch and Highway 198. The area had not experienced fire for over a century. In 2016 a fire was sparked while a weed eating project took place. It burned over 30 acres of the preserve on the Sycamore trail. In August 2016, new restrooms built by the U.S. Army's Innovative Readiness Training program were opened to the public. http://sequoiariverlands.org/what-were-up-to/new-res.html
