= Kerman Unified School District =

Public school district in California

Location
- 151 South First St. Kerman, California 93630 United States

District information
- Type: Public
- Grades: K-12
- Established: 1983
- Superintendent: Gordon Pacheco
- Schools: 9
- NCES District ID: 0619490

Students and staff
- Students: 5,281

Other information
- Website: www.kermanusd.com

Kerman Unified School District is a public school district based in Fresno County, California, United States.

== Schools ==
- Kerman High School
- Kerman Middle School
- Enterprise High School (formerly Nova High School)
- Sun Empire Elementary School
- Kerman-Floyd Elementary School
- Goldenrod Elementary School
- Liberty Elementary School
- Harvest Elementary School
- Kerman Unified Online School
