= John Sontag =

American outlaw

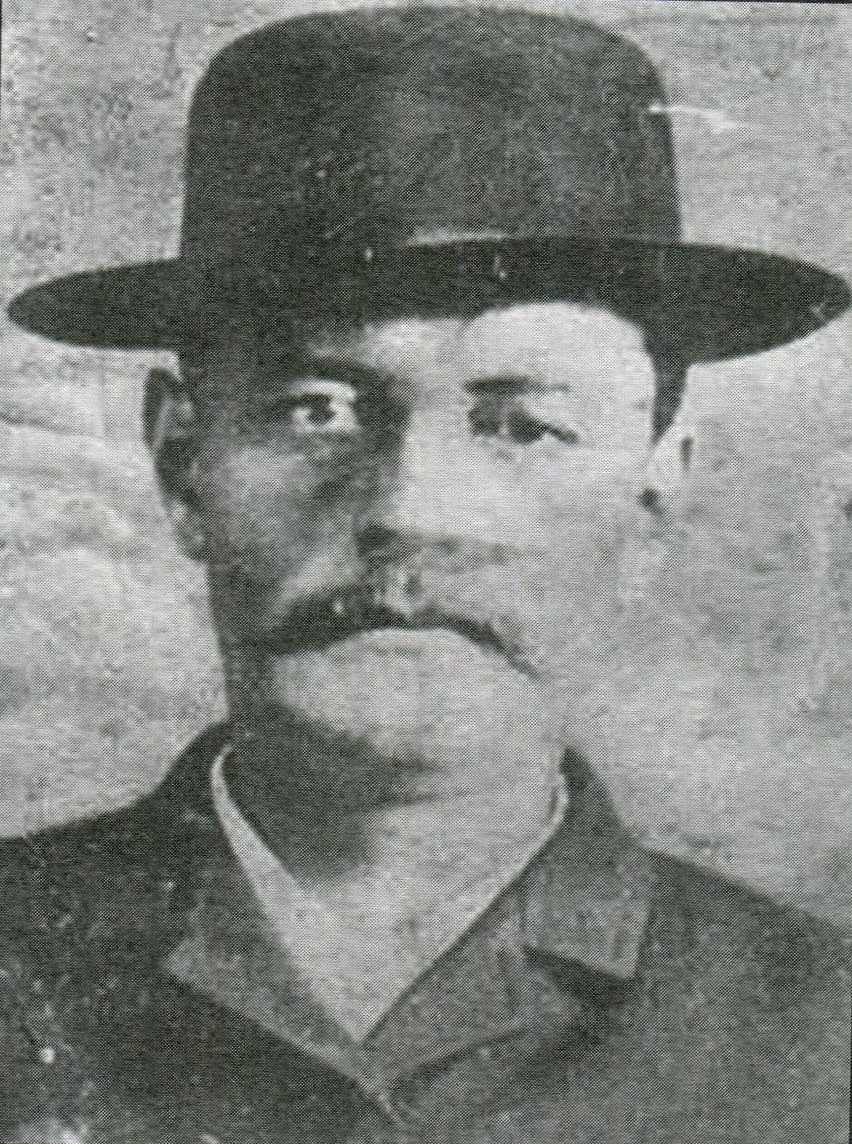
- Born: May 27, 1861; Mankato, Minnesota, US
- Died: July 3, 1893 (aged 32); Fresno, California
- Cause of death: Tetanus; gunshot wounds
- Resting place: Calvary Cemetery in Fresno
- Occupation: Railroad employee-turned-outlaw
- Parent(s): Jacob Contant and Maria Bohn Contant Sontag
- Relatives: Brother George Contant

John Sontag (May 27, 1861 – July 3, 1893) was an outlaw of the American West known for train robberies.

== Background ==
John Sontag was the oldest son of Maria (Bohn) and Jacob Contant of Mankato, Minnesota. After the death of his father in 1867, his mother remarried to Matthias Sontag, a Union Army veteran of the Civil War; John then adopted the last name of Sontag. John Sontag had one sibling, George (born 1864), who kept his last name, but did occasionally use the last name of Sontag. John and George were frequently partners in crime and were known as The Sontag Brothers.

John Sontag came to California to work for the Southern Pacific Transportation Company. While coupling rail cars in the company yard in Fresno his leg was crushed; he accused Southern Pacific of failure to care for his on-the-job wounds and their refusal to rehire him after he had healed. In 1889, John Sontag was working on the farm of Canadian Christopher "Chris" Evans near Visalia in Tulare County. Evans was outraged by Southern Pacific's high freight rates and the pressuring of landowners to sell their property to the railroad. This seizure of particularly valuable wheat-farming land is known as the Mussel Slough Tragedy. Later Sontag and Evans went on to lease a livery stable in Modesto, but after a year the structure burned and the horses were lost in the fire. At some point Sontag became engaged to Eva, daughter of Evans.

After the failure of the livery yard Sontag and Evans began robbing trains in such locations as Ceres, Goshen, Pixley, and Alila, later Earlimart. After each robbery, they would hide in remote places in the foothills of the Eshom Valley, such as Fort Defiance, or Roop's Fort near Susanville, California. The two would leave horses at the spot where they intended to stop the train and would then walk back to the depot and secretly board the train. When the train neared the spot with the waiting horses, the bandits would burst forth from their hiding locations and order the engineer to halt the train; they would dynamite the express car to gain access to the money on board. Finally, they would mount their waiting horses and make their getaway.

Sontag and Evans traveled to Minnesota where they met up with Sontag's brother George Contant, who had been released from Nebraska State Penitentiary in Omaha in 1887 after serving time for theft. On July 1, 1892, they robbed a train while riding along the Minnesota River between St. Peter and Kasota; they acquired nothing of much value, but their crime aroused the concern of Pinkerton detectives. A month later they traveled to California and robbed a train at Collis, now Kerman in Fresno County. They were more successful this time, netting $500 and bags of Mexican and Peruvian coins of no apparent value. Several days later, law-enforcement officers arrested Contant in connection with the crime, but Sontag and Evans fled and spent almost a year as fugitives.

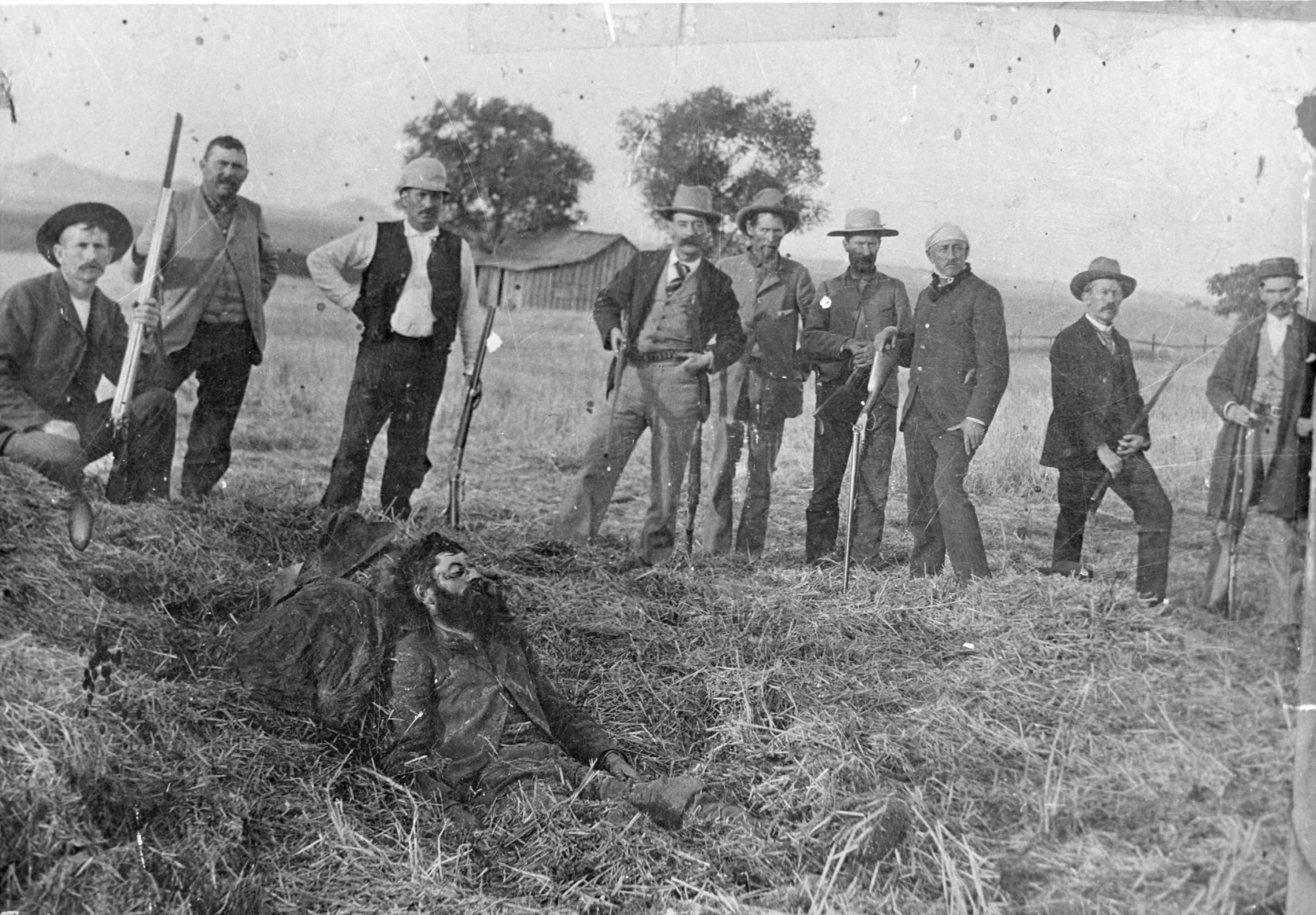
John Sontag wounded at Battle of Stone Corral 1893

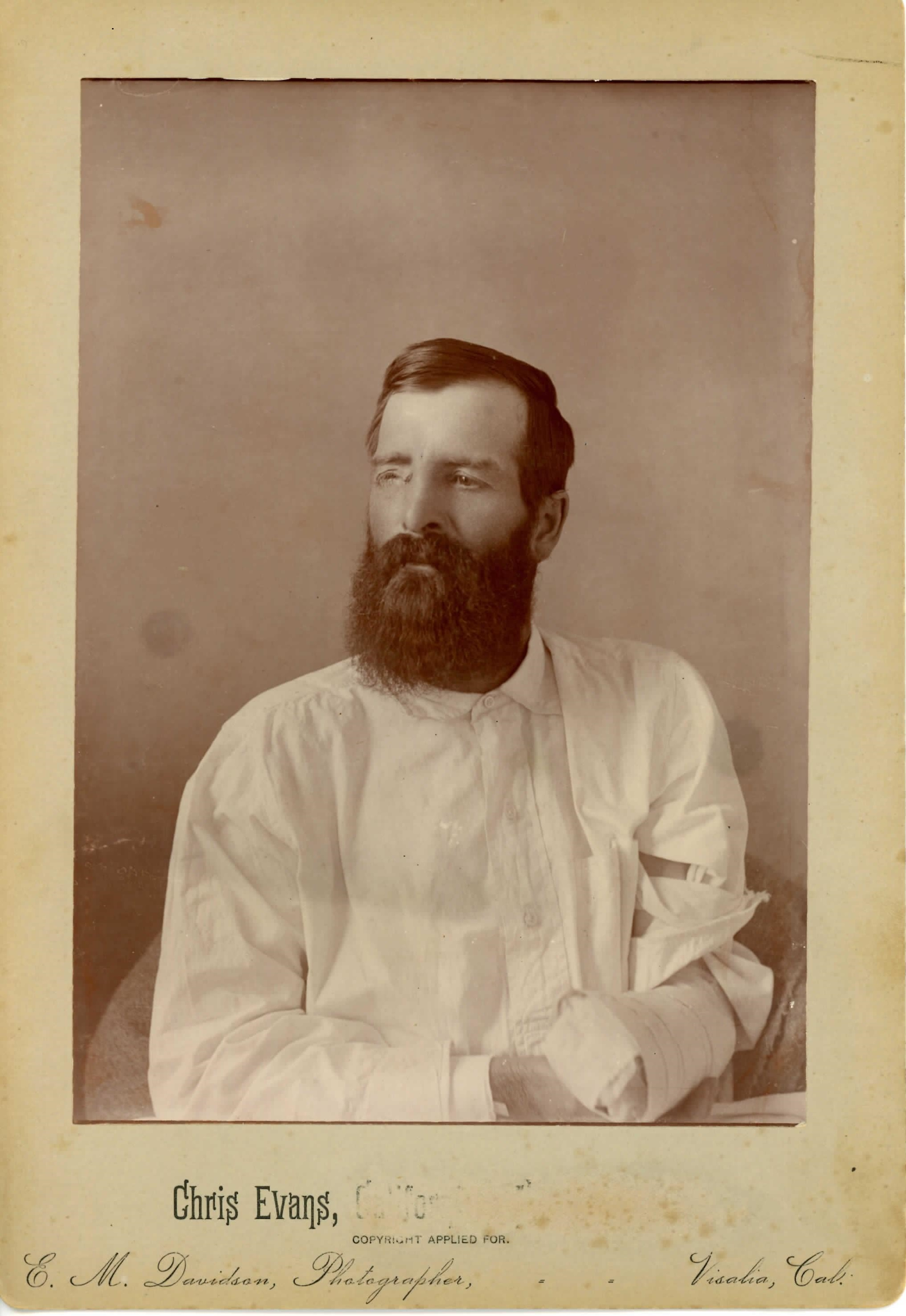
Chris Evans after the shootout at the Stone Corral.

Sontag and Evans were captured in what is now called the Battle of Stone Corral. Shots were fired by members of the posse sent from Visalia. Chris Evans surrendered, but as a result of the shootout he lost an eye and his left arm. Sontag was captured while lying in straw and manure near a deserted cabin at Stone Corral; he sustained severe wounds in the chest and forehead and died (from the wounds or tetanus) in Fresno while in custody.

John Sontag is interred at Calvary Cemetery in Fresno; his tombstone lists his death as occurring in 1892, instead of 1893 so it erroneously indicates that he was 33 years, 6 months, and 4 days old at the time of his death.

Contant was at Folsom State Prison where he was serving his sentence after being found guilty of train robbery in October 1892; he served fifteen years. After release from prison he wrote an autobiography, A Pardoned Lifer, with Opie Warner as his ghostwriter. He lectured in Milwaukee, Minneapolis, and at the Mankato Opera House on the folly of living outside the law. About 1915, he produced a film, The Folly of a Life of Crime; there are no surviving copies. His last whereabouts are unknown, but in 1929 was listed as living in San Francisco in his mother's obituary.

Chris Evans was also sent to Folsom where he remained for seventeen years until pardoned by Governor Hiram Johnson; he denied ever robbing a train and claimed that when he killed it was in self-defense. After released he was banished from California and spent his last years in Portland, Oregon, dying in 1917. While in prison he turned to socialism as his remedy for what he perceived as the corrupt practices of business conglomerates.

The Sontag-Evans case was featured in an episode of Stories of the Century starring Jim Davis, with Kristine Miller. The two portray railroad detectives investigating California train robberies. John Sontag was portrayed by John Smith’’ and Chris Evans by Morris Ankrum.
