= M. Young Botanic Garden =

Botanical garden in Kerman, California

- Location within California Location within the United States
- Type: Botanical garden
- Location: Kerman, California, United States
- Coordinates: 36°43′41.3″N 120°02′44.7″W
- Area: 2.5 acres (1.0 ha)

The M. Young Botanic Garden 2.5 acres (1.0 ha) is a botanical garden located at 14178 West Kearney, Kerman, California, United States. Every plant used is drought-tolerant. One section contains Southwestern native trees, shrubs and ground covers. Another will include 12 different gardens with a water-conservation theme, some with paths, arbors, patios and seating areas.

== See also ==
- List of botanical gardens in the United States
