= United States Post Office-Visalia Town Center Station =

Coordinates: 36.329054°N 119.292888°W

- US Post Office—Visalia Town Center
- U.S. National Register of Historic Places
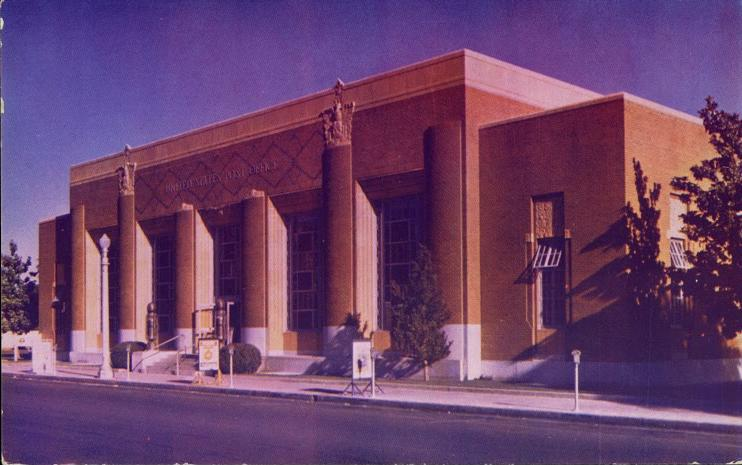
- Visalia Town Center Post Office circa 1960
- Location: 111 West Acequia Avenue, Visalia, California
- Built: 1932–33
- Architect: William D. Coates
- Architectural style: Art Deco-Beaux Arts
- NRHP reference No.: 85000142
- Added to NRHP: 1985

The Visalia Town Center Post Office is a registered historic building on Acequia Avenue in downtown Visalia, California. The Art Deco structure opened in 1933 and was added to the National Register of Historic Places in 1985 due to its architectural and engineering significance. It remains in operation as a post office.

== Description ==
Commonly referred to as the "Downtown" post office or "TCS", the structure was built from 1932 to 1933 as a part of the New Deal's mission to build infrastructure during the Great Depression.

The Visalia Town Center Post Office, designed by Fresno-native architect William D. Coates, conforms to the standard symmetry used in most post offices of the time, but has unusually sophisticated terracotta detailing in shapes directly derivative of 1920s Art Deco motifs. Decorative dark-brown brick contrasts the light-tan brick used for the bulk of the building's walls. The interior ornamentation is lavish, and includes cast aluminum, marble, and a decorative multi-colored terrazzo floor.

The building has a structured steel skeleton, brick walls, a flat asphalt-composition roof, and a reinforced concrete basement. The building's volumetric massing is symmetrical and derived from the neo-classical phase of Beaux-Arts architecture. The exterior includes aluminum, granite, white bronze, and plinth. The lobby is ornamented with veined marble and a terrazzo floor, the workroom has a maple parquet floor, and the postmaster's offices have oak floors.

Two distinct architectural styles are visible in the building: the late neo-classical period of Beaux-Arts, and Art Deco ("Zigzag Moderne"). While the fenestration and ornamentation are strictly symmetrical, typical of Beaux-Arts design, the terracotta panels all contain Art Deco motifs. Following with Art Deco tradition, the architect drew heavy inspiration from a multitude of sources, including Mesoamerica, Greece, Rome, and Egypt.

== History ==
During the Great Depression the Public Works Administration often used Art Deco elements in a primarily classical and monumental framework. The Visalia Town Center US Post Office thus presages the style and aesthetic of much subsequent government architecture in the thirties. This style of architecture was commonly used in private projects in the 1920s and is often associated with decadently luxurious shops and hotels, though by the time the Town Center Post Office was built the Depression had halted most of these private projects. Although the Visalia Post Office uses Art Deco ornamental motifs, the structure is more of a monolithic monument than a pretty piece of art, a characteristic typical of Government construction in the period in which it was built.

The construction process for this building was highly labor-intensive, as seen in the careful masonry, the elaborate terrazzo floor, and the use of parquet rather than strip flooring in the workroom and office areas. The level of craftsmanship was uniformly high in most Depression-era government construction, and the Visalia Town Center Post Office provides an excellent example of this.

== Images ==
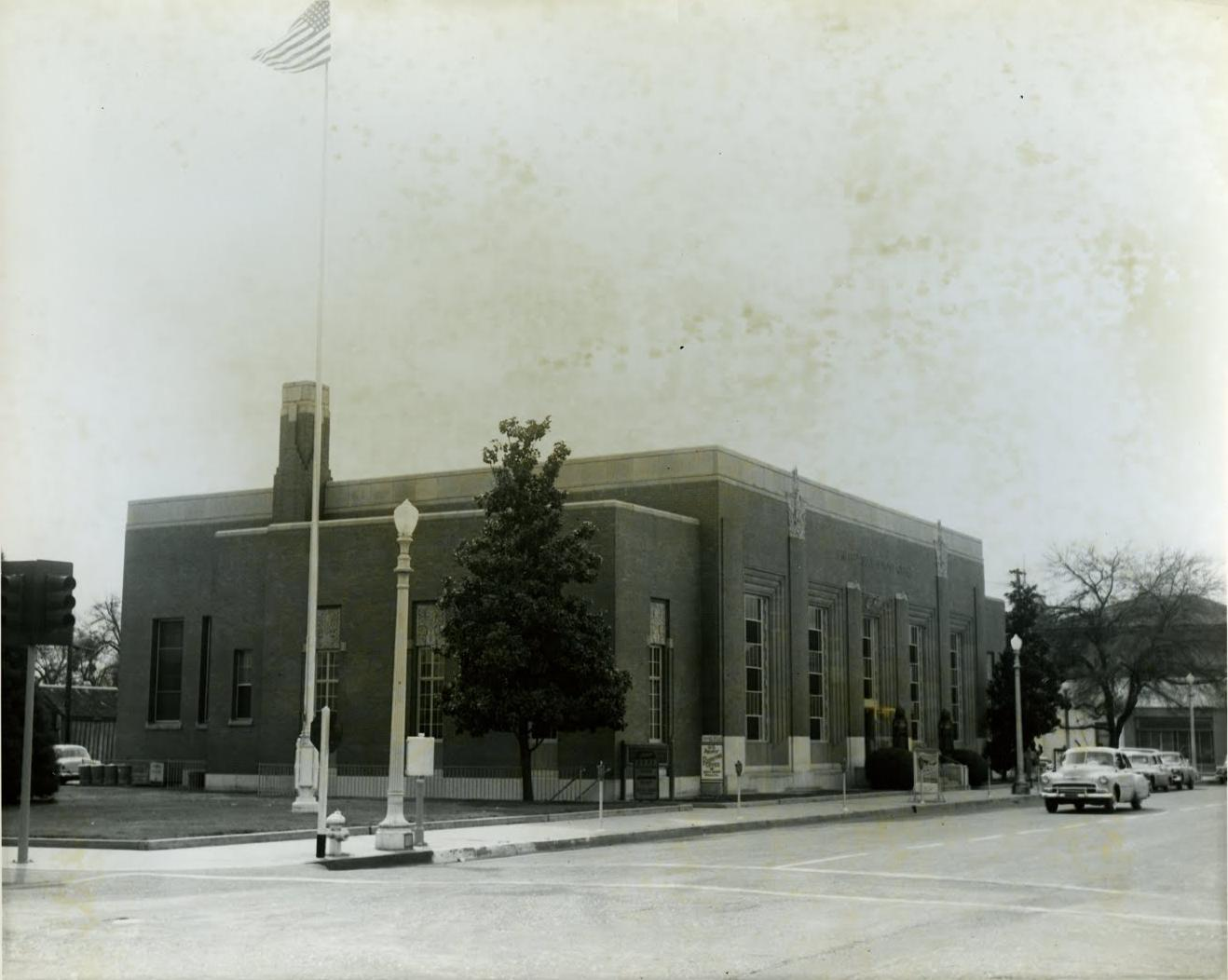

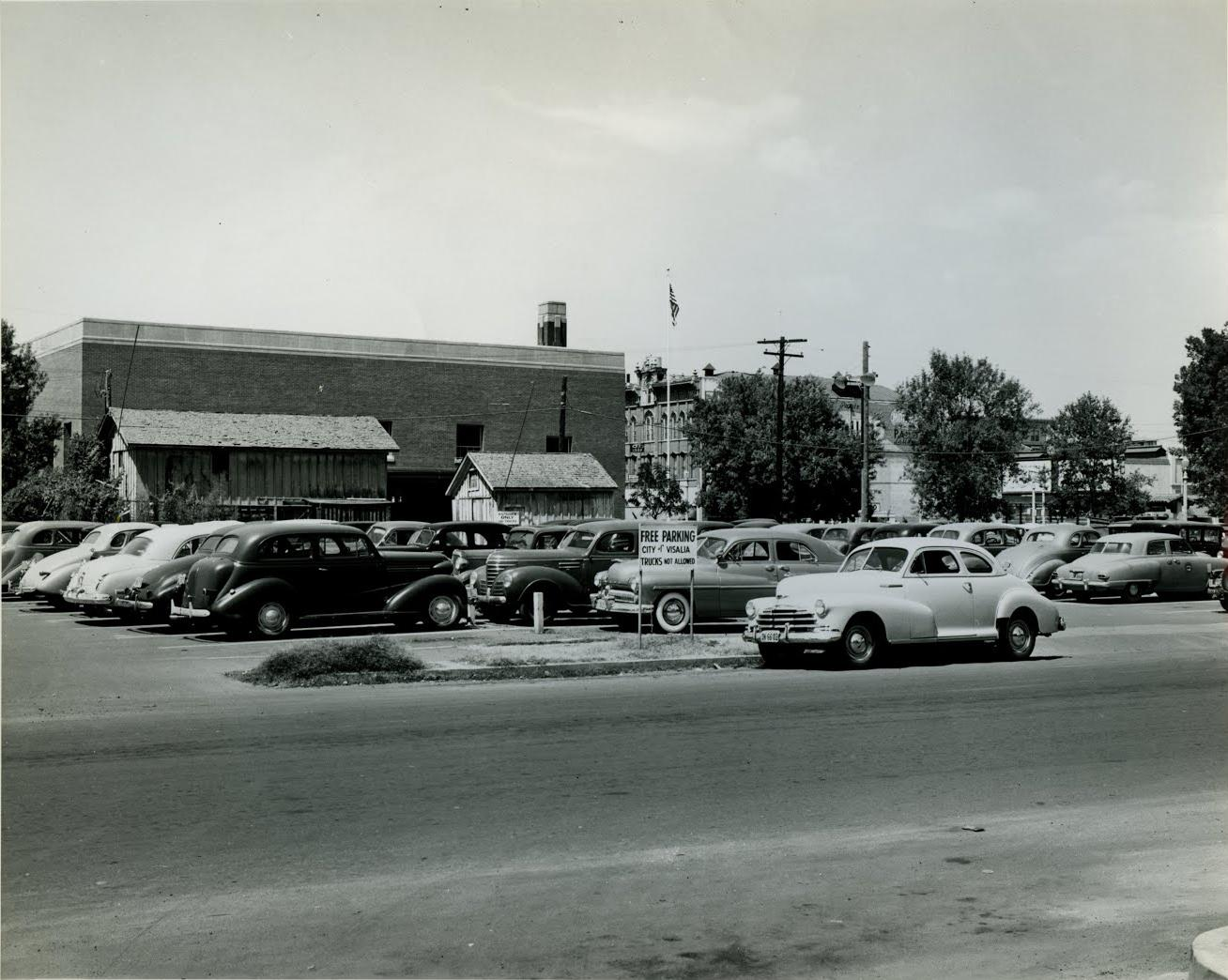

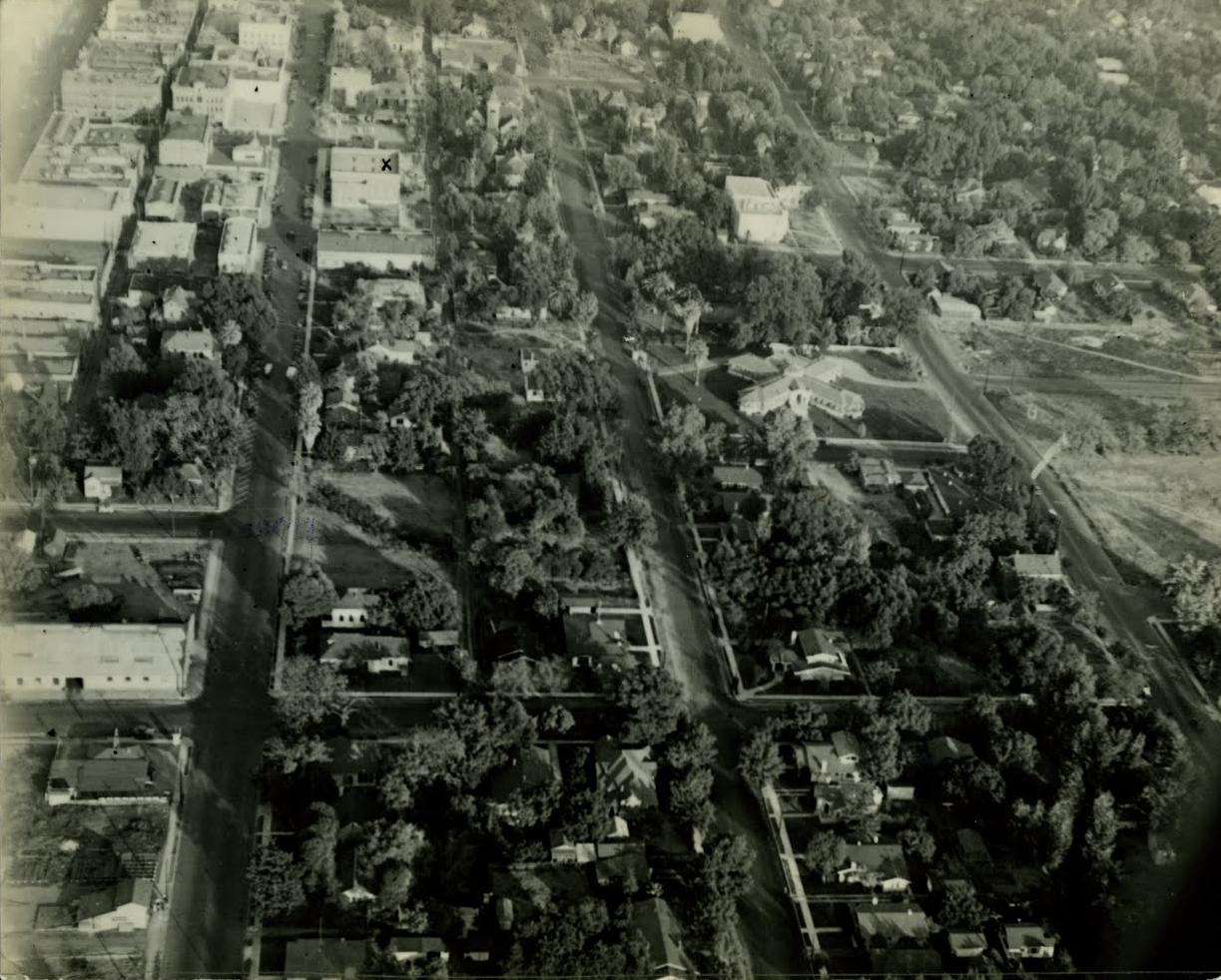

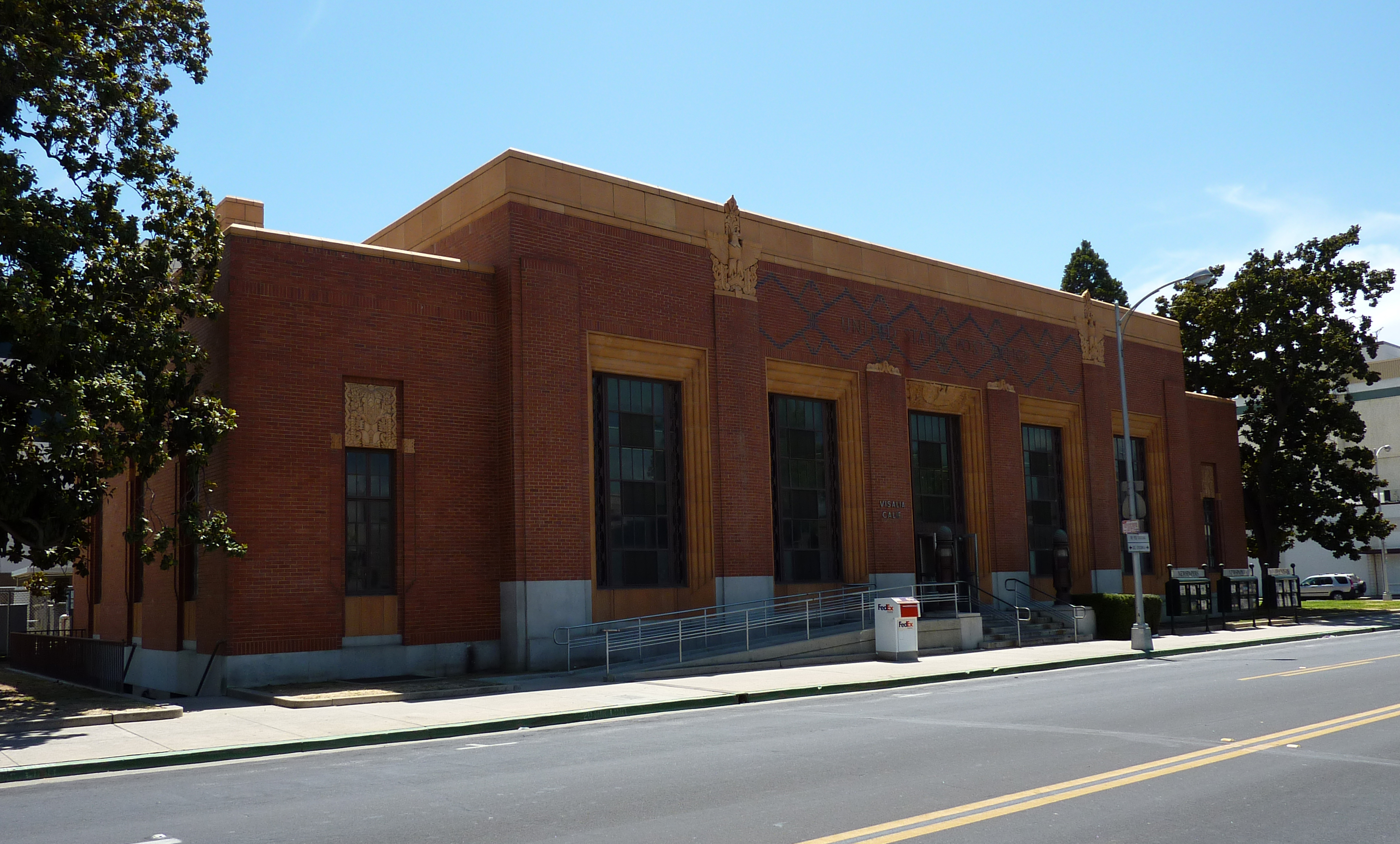

== See also ==
- National Register of Historic Places listings in Tulare County, California
- List of United States post offices
