= Visalia, California =

City in California, United States

- City
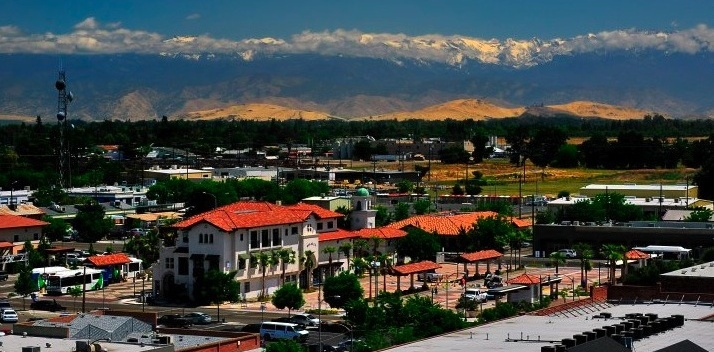
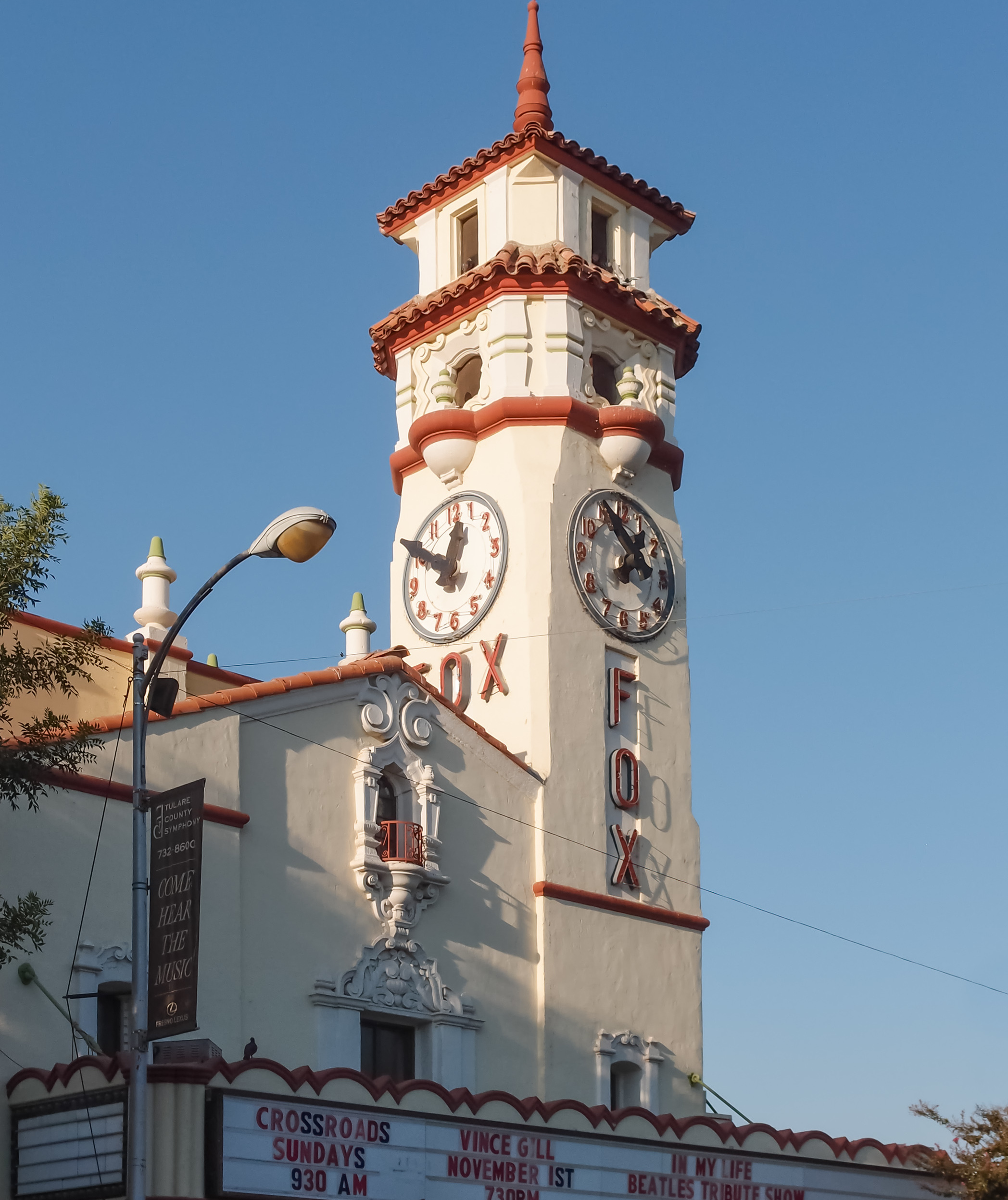
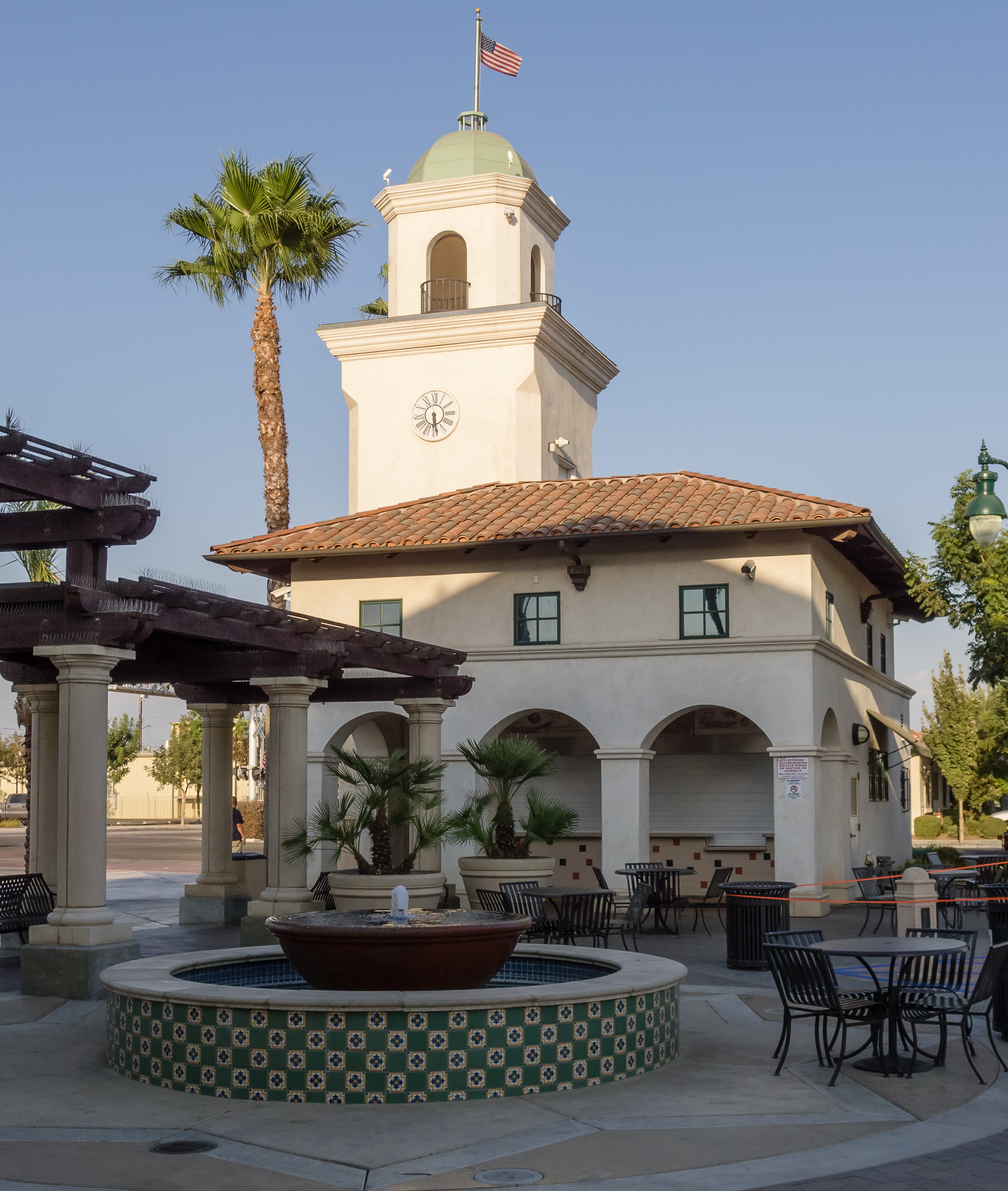
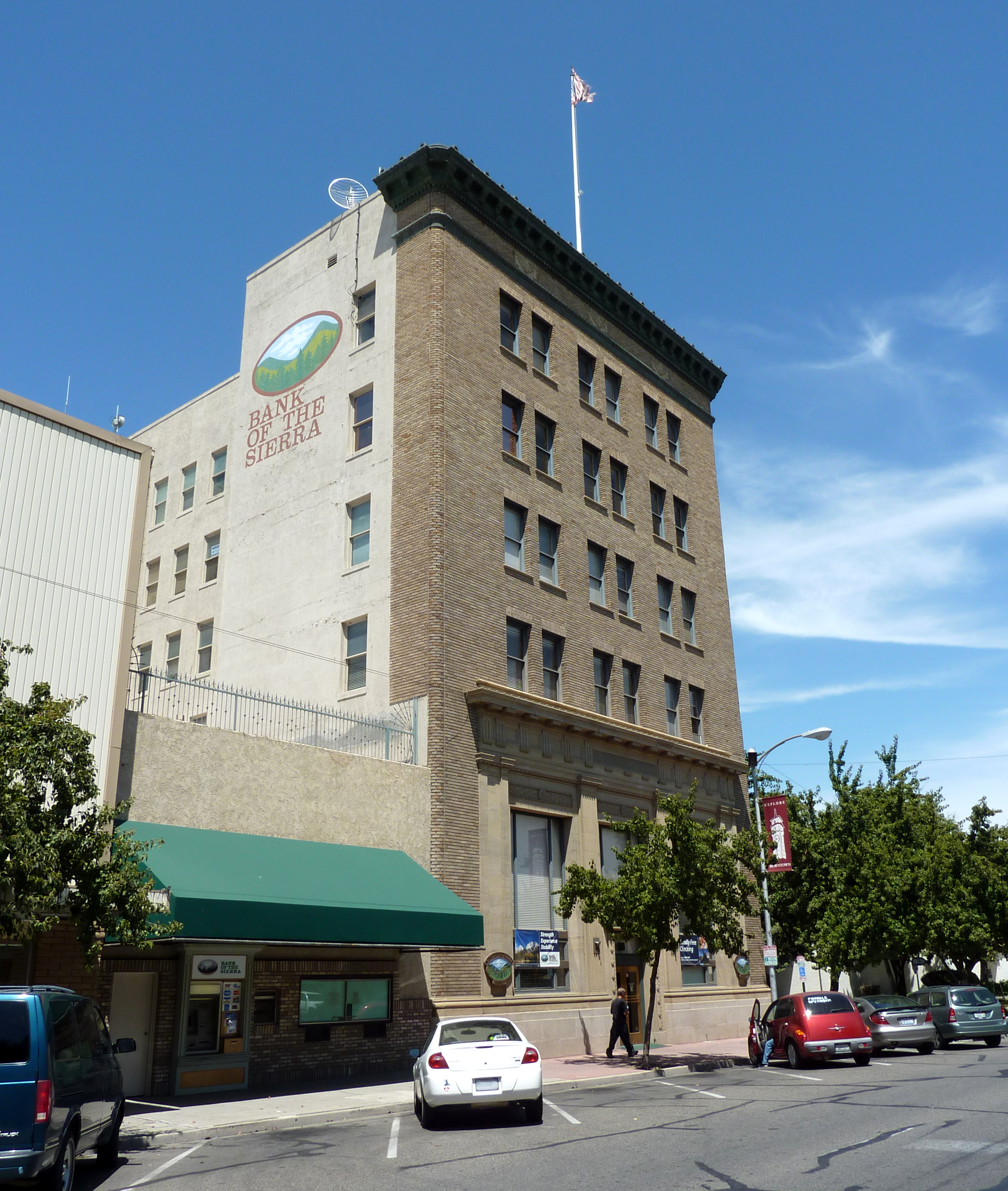
- Clockwise: View of Visalia; Bank of Italy Tower; Visalia Transit Center; Fox Theatre

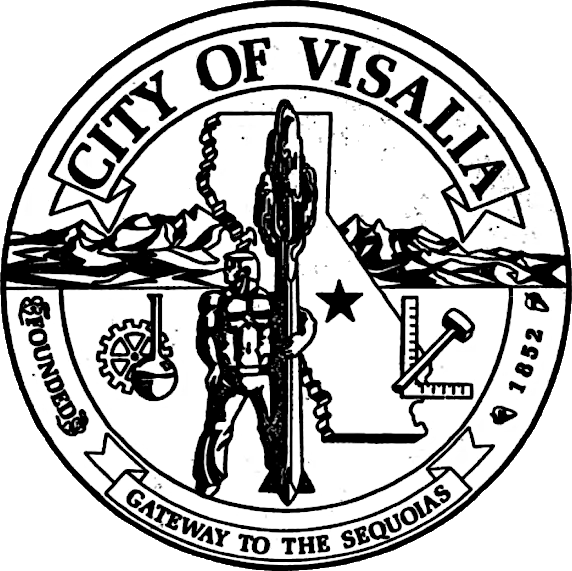
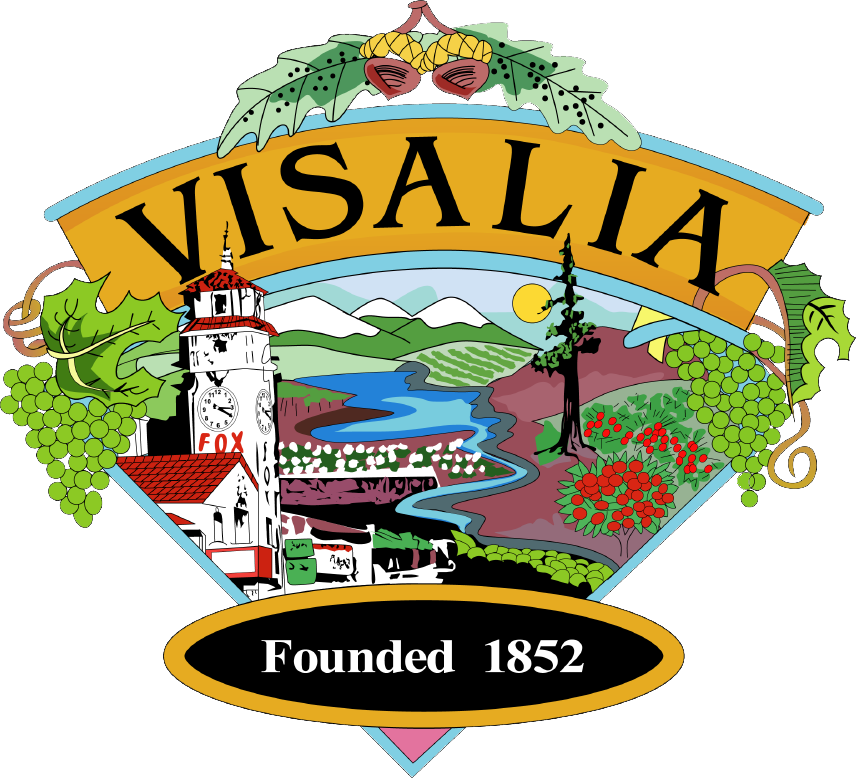
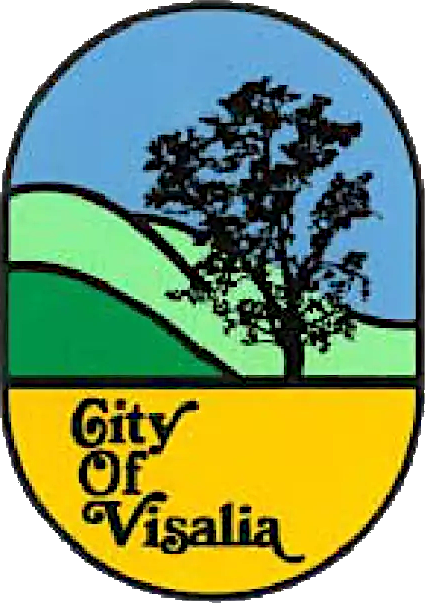
- Seal Coat of arms Logo
- Nickname: Gateway to the Sequoias
- Interactive map of Visalia, California
- Location in the United States Visalia (the United States)
- Coordinates: 36°19′49″N 119°17′33″W
- Country: United States
- State: California
- Region: San Joaquin Valley
- County: Tulare
- Incorporated: February 27, 1874

Government
  - Type: Council–manager
  - City council: Mayor Brett Taylor; Vice Mayor Liz Wynn; Brian Poochigian; Emmanuel Hernandez Soto; Steve Nelsen
  - City manager: Leslie Caviglia
  - Chief of police: Jason Salazar
  - Fire chief: Dan Griswold

Area
  - Total: 37.93 sq mi (98.25 km^{2})
  - Land: 37.92 sq mi (98.20 km^{2})
  - Water: 0.019 sq mi (0.05 km^{2}) 0.05%
- Elevation: 331 ft (101 m)

Population (2020)
  - Total: 141,384
  - Rank: 38th in California; 183rd in the United States
  - Density: 3,727.0/sq mi (1,439.02/km^{2})
- Demonym: Visalian
- Time zone: UTC−8 (PST)
  - Summer (DST): UTC−7 (PDT)
- ZIP code: 93277-93279, 93290-93292
- Area code: 559
- FIPS code: 06-82954
- GNIS feature IDs: 1652807, 2412160
- Website: visalia.gov

Visalia (/vaɪˈseɪljə, vɪ-/ vy-SAYL-yə, vih-) is a city in the agricultural San Joaquin Valley of California. The population was 141,384 as per the 2020 census. Visalia is the fifth-most populous city in the San Joaquin Valley, the 38th most populous in California, and 183rd in the United States. As the county seat of Tulare County, Visalia serves as the economic and governmental center to one of the most productive agricultural counties in the country.

== History ==
The area around Visalia was first settled by the Yokuts and Mono Native American tribes hundreds of years ago. When the first Europeans arrived is unknown, but the first to make a written record of the area was Pedro Fages in 1722.

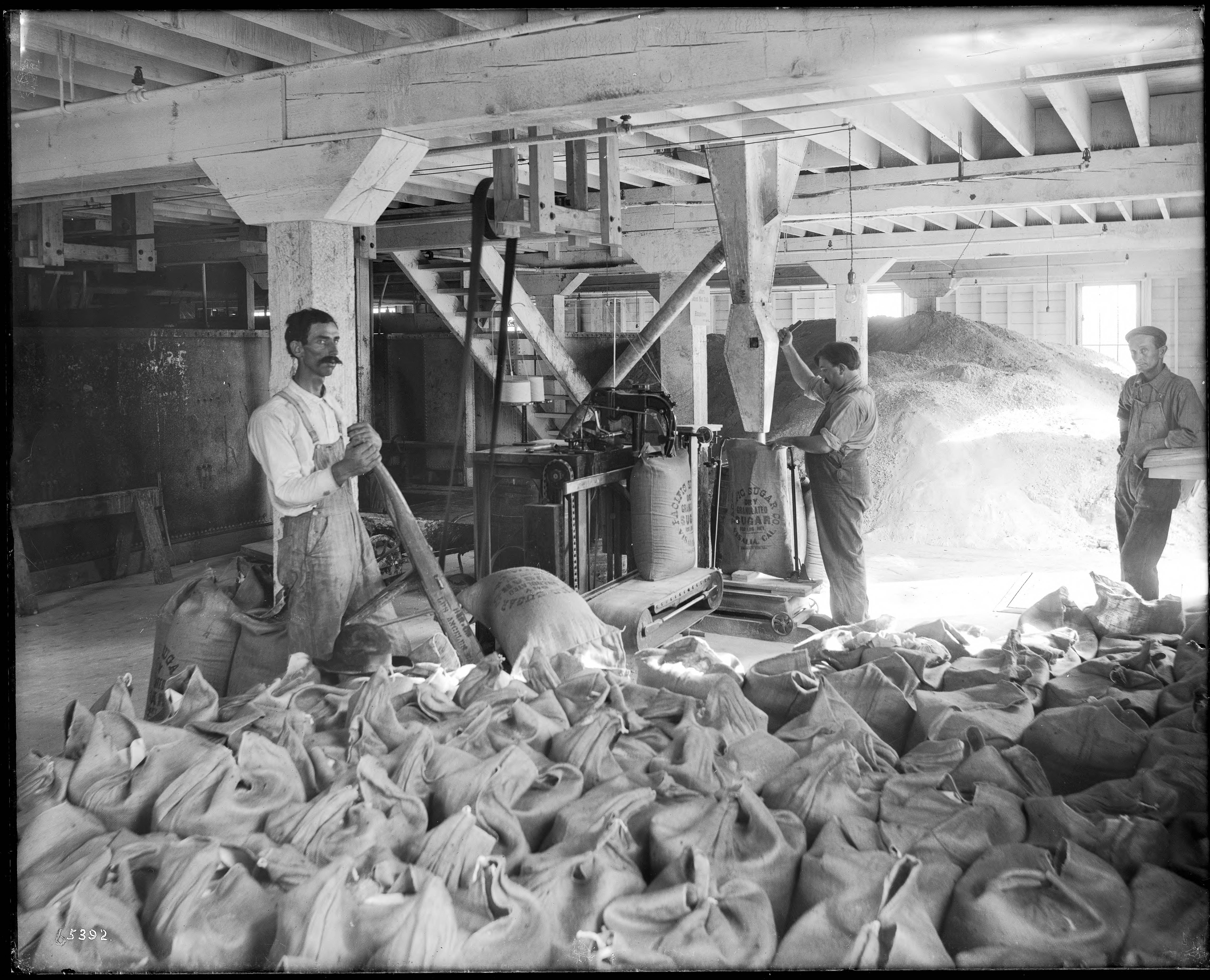
Workers weighing and sacking sugar at the Pacific Sugar Company in Visalia, c. 1900

When California achieved statehood in 1850, Tulare County did not exist. The land that is now Tulare County was part of the vast County of Mariposa. In 1852, some pioneers settled in the area, then called Four Creeks. The area got its name from the many watershed creeks and rivers flowing from the Sierra Nevada Mountains. All the water resulted in a widespread swampy area with a magnificent oak forest. The industrious group of settlers petitioned the state legislature for county status, and on July 10 of that same year, Tulare County became a reality.

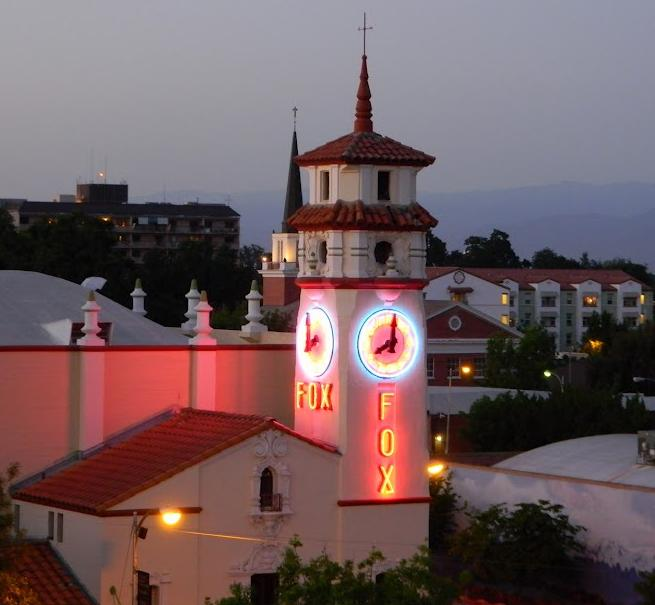
Visalia Fox Theater

One of the first inhabitants of a fort built by the settlers was Nathaniel Vise, who was responsible for surveying the new settlement. In November 1852, he wrote, "The town contains from 60–80 inhabitants, 30 of whom are children of school age. The town is located upon one of the subdivisions of the Kaweah River and is destined to be the county seat of Tulare." In 1853, that prediction became a reality and Visalia has remained the county seat since that time. Visalia is named for Nathaniel Vise's ancestral home, Visalia, Kentucky.

Early growth in Visalia can be attributed in part to the gold rush along the Kern River. The gold fever brought many transient miners through Visalia along the way, and when the lure of gold failed to materialize, many returned to Visalia to live their lives and raise families. In 1859, Visalia was added to John Butterfield's Overland Stage route from St. Louis to San Francisco. A plaque commemorating the location can be found at 116 East Main Street. Included in the early citizens were some notorious and nasty individuals who preyed upon the travelers along the Butterfield Stage route. Many saloons and hotels sprouted up around the stage stop downtown and commerce was brisk if a bit risky.

The next memorable event was the arrival of the telegraph in 1860. Visalians then could get timely information of the events taking place on the East Coast that would ultimately develop into the Civil War. During the war, many citizens of Visalia were unable to decide whether Visalia should stand on the side of the North or the South, so they simply had a mini Civil War of their own on Main Street. No one really knows the outcome of the war, but apparently it was concluded to the satisfaction of the participants and life returned to normal. The federal government, however, was not so easily convinced, and reacting to concern about sedition, banned Visalia's pro-South Equal Rights Expositor newspaper and established a military garrison. Camp Babbitt was built in 1862 to stop overt Southern support and maintain law and order in the community. During these Civil War years, Visalia was incorporated, which gave the town new rights.

The second incorporation in 1874 moved Visalia into city status with a common council and an ex-officio mayor and president. In 1893, the train bandits and murderers John Sontag and Chris Evans were apprehended, badly wounded, outside Visalia in what is called the Battle of Stone Corral. Sontag died three weeks later in police custody in Fresno; Evans was sent to Folsom State Prison. In 1904, the Visalia Electric Railroad was incorporated.

In October 1933, Visalia was the site of a fact-finding committee appointed by Governor James Rolph and charged with investigating labor violence in the San Joaquin cotton strike. Labor activist Caroline Decker led hundreds of strikers in a march on the courthouse, and led the questioning of strikers during the investigation. In the mid-1970s, the area was known for the serial burglaries of the then unidentified Visalia Ransacker. More recently, Visalia served as a host city for the Amgen Tour of California in 2009 and 2010.

== Geography ==
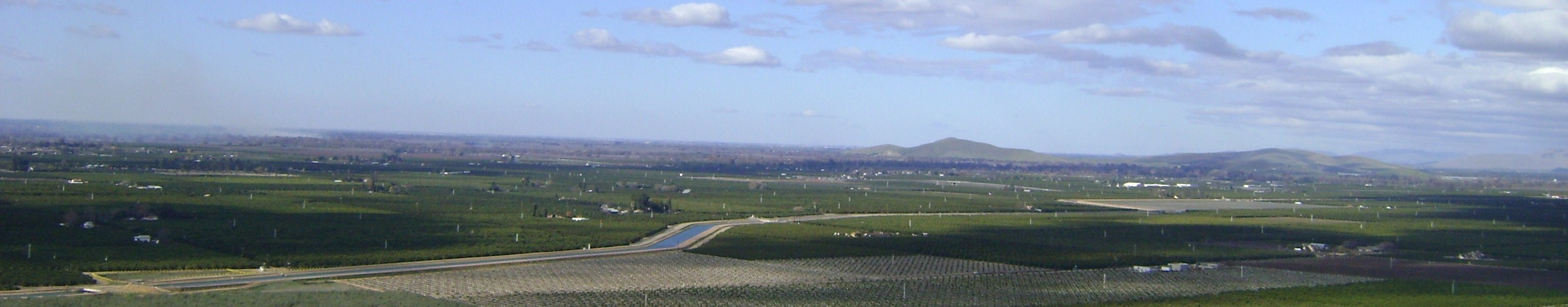
A view of East Visalia from Rocky Hill. Left to right: Exeter, Visalia, Friant-Kern Canal (foreground), Sequoia Freeway, Venice Hills, and Woodlake.

Visalia is irregularly shaped and covers a total area of 36.3 sq mi (94 km^{2}), of which 36.3 sq mi (94 km^{2}) are land and 0.05% is covered by water. Visalia is located at 36°19'27" North, 119°18'26" West (36.324100, −119.307347).

The highest point in the Visalia–Porterville area is Mount Whitney. Located at the far reaches of the Sierra Nevada roughly 58 mi (93 km) east of the city, it reaches a height of 14,505 ft (4,421 m), and was long famous as the highest mountain in the lower 48 states. The hilliest parts of the Visalia area are the Venice Hills and the entire Sierra Nevada foothills east of the city. Four main streams run through the city. The major stream is the St. John's River, which begins at the diversion dam in the Kaweah River and is largely seasonal. The others are Mill Creek, Cameron Creek, and Packwood Creek. Many smaller creeks also flow through the city. The Friant-Kern Canal runs just east of the city along the western edge of the Sierra Nevada foothills.

=== Cityscape ===
The city is divided into neighborhoods, some of which were incorporated places or communities. Also, several independent cities around Visalia are popularly grouped with the city of Visalia, due to its immediate vicinity. Generally, the city is divided into these areas: Downtown Visalia, North Visalia, the Eastside, Southwest Visalia, the Industrial Area, Mooney, and the Westside.

=== Climate ===
Visalia has a semi-arid climate (BSk, under the Köppen climate classification), and receives just enough annual precipitation to stay out of Köppen's BWk (desert climate) classification. Visalia enjoys plenty of sunshine throughout the year, with an average of only 26 days with measurable precipitation annually.

The hottest temperature ever recorded in Visalia was 115 °F (46.1 °C), recorded on three different occasions – July 18, 1925; July 26, 1931; and August 12, 1933. The city's coldest temperature was 15 °F (−9.4 °C), recorded on January 5, 1913. However, snowfall is extremely rare in Visalia. The greatest snowfall recorded in the city was 2 inches (5.1 cm), recorded on January 25, 1999. Visalia averages 10.32 inches (262.1 mm) of precipitation annually, which mainly occurs during the winter and spring (November through April) with generally light rain showers, but sometimes as heavy rainfall and thunderstorms. Years of average rainfall are rare; the usual pattern is bimodal, with a short string of dry years (perhaps 7–8 inches (180–200 mm)) followed by one or two wet years that make up the average. The city falls within USDA plant hardiness zone 9b (25 to 30 °F; −4 to −1 °C).

Climate data for Visalia, California, 1991–2020 normals, extremes 1898–present
Month	Jan	Feb	Mar	Apr	May	Jun	Jul	Aug	Sep	Oct	Nov	Dec	Year
Record high °F (°C)	80 (27)	89 (32)	93 (34)	103 (39)	108 (42)	113 (45)	115 (46)	115 (46)	110 (43)	104 (40)	94 (34)	86 (30)	115 (46)
Mean maximum °F (°C)	66.7 (19.3)	71.8 (22.1)	78.8 (26.0)	87.5 (30.8)	94.5 (34.7)	101.0 (38.3)	101.9 (38.8)	101.1 (38.4)	97.7 (36.5)	89.9 (32.2)	77.0 (25.0)	67.0 (19.4)	103.4 (39.7)
Mean daily maximum °F (°C)	55.3 (12.9)	61.3 (16.3)	66.9 (19.4)	72.7 (22.6)	80.6 (27.0)	88.8 (31.6)	93.8 (34.3)	93.2 (34.0)	88.3 (31.3)	77.8 (25.4)	64.4 (18.0)	55.4 (13.0)	74.9 (23.8)
Daily mean °F (°C)	46.9 (8.3)	51.4 (10.8)	56.2 (13.4)	60.6 (15.9)	68.0 (20.0)	75.1 (23.9)	80.2 (26.8)	79.0 (26.1)	74.2 (23.4)	65.1 (18.4)	53.9 (12.2)	46.6 (8.1)	63.1 (17.3)
Mean daily minimum °F (°C)	38.4 (3.6)	41.6 (5.3)	45.4 (7.4)	48.6 (9.2)	55.4 (13.0)	61.5 (16.4)	66.7 (19.3)	64.9 (18.3)	60.1 (15.6)	52.3 (11.3)	43.3 (6.3)	37.9 (3.3)	51.3 (10.8)
Mean minimum °F (°C)	30.8 (−0.7)	34.3 (1.3)	37.6 (3.1)	40.4 (4.7)	47.7 (8.7)	53.0 (11.7)	61.1 (16.2)	59.4 (15.2)	52.8 (11.6)	44.2 (6.8)	35.4 (1.9)	30.6 (−0.8)	29.3 (−1.5)
Record low °F (°C)	13 (−11)	24 (−4)	22 (−6)	26 (−3)	29 (−2)	35 (2)	40 (4)	40 (4)	32 (0)	25 (−4)	23 (−5)	20 (−7)	13 (−11)
Average precipitation inches (mm)	1.96 (50)	1.64 (42)	1.82 (46)	0.97 (25)	0.36 (9.1)	0.13 (3.3)	0.00 (0.00)	0.00 (0.00)	0.07 (1.8)	0.55 (14)	0.99 (25)	1.83 (46)	10.32 (262.2)
Average snowfall inches (cm)	0.1 (0.25)	0.0 (0.0)	0.0 (0.0)	0.0 (0.0)	0.0 (0.0)	0.0 (0.0)	0.0 (0.0)	0.0 (0.0)	0.0 (0.0)	0.0 (0.0)	0.0 (0.0)	0.0 (0.0)	0.1 (0.25)
Average precipitation days (≥ 0.01 in)	7.5	6.9	6.6	3.7	2.1	0.7	0.0	0.1	0.4	1.9	3.6	6.4	39.9
Average snowy days (≥ 0.1 in)	0.0	0.0	0.0	0.0	0.0	0.0	0.0	0.0	0.0	0.0	0.0	0.0	0.0
Source 1: NOAA
Source 2: National Weather Service

=== Importance of the valley oak ===
Visalia's Valley Oak Ordinance, adopted in 1971, regulates pruning and removing valley oak (Quercus lobata) trees. The area was once a dense oak woodland and the city is trying to maintain a healthy urban forest partly through preserving Mooney Grove Park, one of the largest valley oak groves in California. Also, just outside the city limits is the Kaweah Oaks Preserve, which is a 322-acre (1.3 km^{2}) nature preserve. It protects one of the last remaining valley oak riparian forests in the San Joaquin Valley.

=== Visalia Rawhide ===
The Visalia Rawhide are a Minor League Baseball team of the California League and the Single-A affiliate of the Arizona Diamondbacks. They have played their home games at Valley Strong Ballpark since their inception in 1946.

The team has had nine names, most of which reflected its changing major-league affiliates, most recently the Minnesota Twins, Colorado Rockies, Oakland A's, Tampa Bay Rays, and Diamondbacks. They took the name Rawhide in 2009.

In conjunction with Major League Baseball's restructuring of Minor League Baseball in 2021, the Rawhide were organized into the Low-A West at the Low-A classification. In 2022, the Low-A West became known as the California League, the name historically used by the regional circuit prior to the 2021 reorganization, and was reclassified as a Single-A circuit.

=== Environmental issues ===
Owing to geography Visalia suffers from air pollution in the form of smog, agricultural and other particulates. The Visalia area and the rest of the San Joaquin Valley are susceptible to atmospheric inversion, which holds in the exhausts from road vehicles, airplanes, locomotives, manufacturing, and other sources. Unlike other cities that rely on rain to clear smog, Visalia gets only 11.03 in (280.16 mm) of rain each year; pollution accumulates over many consecutive days. Issues of air quality in Visalia and other major cities led to the passage of early national environmental legislation, including the Clean Air Act. More recently, the state of California has led the nation in working to limit pollution by mandating low emission vehicles. Particulate pollution can also be high during the winter due to frequent low-level inversions and during longer periods of dry weather. The same low-level inversions that cause high pollution levels in the winter also cause the frequent dense fog, locally known as Tule fog.

As a result, pollution levels have dropped in recent decades. The number of stage 1 smog alerts has declined from over 100 per year in the 1970s to almost zero in the new millennium. Despite improvement, the 2006 annual report of the American Lung Association ranked the city as the 11th-most polluted in the country with short-term particle pollution and year-round particle pollution. In 2007, the annual report of the American Lung Association ranked the city as the fourth-most polluted in the country with short-term particle pollution and year-round particle pollution. In 2008, the city was ranked the third-most polluted and again fourth for highest year-round particulate pollution.

== Demographics ==
Historical population
Census	Pop.	Note	%±
1860	548		—
1870	913		66.6%
1880	1,412		54.7%
1890	2,885		104.3%
1900	3,085		6.9%
1910	4,550		47.5%
1920	5,753		26.4%
1930	7,263		26.2%
1940	8,904		22.6%
1950	11,749		32.0%
1960	15,791		34.4%
1970	27,130		71.8%
1980	49,729		83.3%
1990	75,636		52.1%
2000	91,565		21.1%
2010	124,442		35.9%
2020	141,384		13.6%
2025 (est.)	146,541	▲	3.6%
U.S. Decennial Census; 1850–1870 1880–1890; 1900 1910 1920; 1930 1940 1950; 1960 1970 1980; 1990 2000 2010

Visalia city, California – Racial and ethnic composition Note: the US Census treats Hispanic/Latino as an ethnic category. This table excludes Latinos from the racial categories and assigns them to a separate category. Hispanics/Latinos may be of any race.
Race / Ethnicity (NH = Non-Hispanic)	Pop 2000	Pop 2010	Pop 2020	% 2000	% 2010	% 2020
White alone (NH)	50,269	55,081	50,556	54.90%	44.26%	35.76%
Black or African American alone (NH)	1,558	2,166	2,398	1.70%	1.74%	1.70%
Native American or Alaska Native alone (NH)	675	811	827	0.74%	0.65%	0.58%
Asian alone (NH)	4,472	6,421	7,655	4.88%	5.16%	5.41%
Pacific Islander alone (NH)	79	129	131	0.09%	0.10%	0.09%
Other Race alone (NH)	87	209	672	0.10%	0.17%	0.48%
Mixed race or Multiracial (NH)	1,806	2,363	4,570	1.97%	1.90%	3.23%
Hispanic or Latino (any race)	32,619	57,262	74,575	35.62%	46.02%	52.75%
Total	91,565	124,442	141,384	100.00%	100.00%	100.00%

Race (NH = Non-Hispanic)	% 1990	% 1980	Pop 1990	Pop 1980
White alone (NH)	66.4%	76.9%	50,212	38,234
Black alone (NH)	1.4%	1.1%	1,054	566
American Indian alone (NH)	0.8%	1.3%	596	623
Asian or Pacific Islander alone (NH)	6.1%	1.2%	4,646	619
Other race alone (NH)	0.2%	0.3%	123	154
Hispanic/Latino (any race)	25.1%	19.2%	19,005	9,533

=== 2020 census ===
The 2020 United States census reported that Visalia had a population of 141,384. The population density was 3,727.0 inhabitants per square mile (1,439.0/km^{2}). The racial makeup of Visalia was 46.2% White, 2.1% African American, 2.0% Native American, 5.8% Asian, 0.2% Pacific Islander, 26.9% from other races, and 16.9% from two or more races. Hispanic or Latino of any race were 52.7% of the population.

The census reported that 98.8% of the population lived in households, 0.5% lived in non-institutionalized group quarters, and 0.7% were institutionalized.

There were 46,561 households, out of which 41.1% included children under the age of 18, 48.9% were married-couple households, 8.8% were cohabiting couple households, 26.0% had a female householder with no partner present, and 16.3% had a male householder with no partner present. 19.9% of households were one person, and 8.8% were one person aged 65 or older. The average household size was 3.0. There were 34,617 families (74.3% of all households).

The age distribution was 27.9% under the age of 18, 9.0% aged 18 to 24, 28.2% aged 25 to 44, 21.6% aged 45 to 64, and 13.3% who were 65 years of age or older. The median age was 34.1 years. For every 100 females, there were 95.7 males.

There were 48,441 housing units at an average density of 1,276.9 units per square mile (493.0 units/km^{2}), of which 46,561 (96.1%) were occupied. Of these, 61.5% were owner-occupied, and 38.5% were occupied by renters.

In 2023, the US Census Bureau estimated that the median household income was $79,952, and the per capita income was $33,910. About 8.8% of families and 11.3% of the population were below the poverty line.

=== 2010 census ===
The 2010 United States census reported that Visalia had a population of 124,442. The population density was 3,431.4 inhabitants per square mile (1,324.9/km^{2}). The racial makeup of Visalia was 80,203 (64.5%) White, 2,627 (2.1%) African American, 1,730 (1.4%) Native American, 6,768 (5.4%) Asian, 164 (0.1%) Pacific Islander, 27,249 (21.9%) from other races, and 5,701 (4.6%) from two or more races. There were 57,262 people (46.0%) people of Hispanic or Latino origin, of any race.

The Census reported that 123,116 people (98.9% of the population) lived in households, 606 (0.5%) lived in non-institutionalized group quarters, and 720 (0.6%) were institutionalized.

There were 41,349 households, out of which 18,102 (43.8%) had children under the age of 18 living in them, 21,219 (51.3%) were opposite-sex married couples living together, 6,508 (15.7%) had a female householder with no husband present, 2,909 (7.0%) had a male householder with no wife present. There were 3,282 (7.9%) unmarried opposite-sex partnerships. 8,383 households (20.3%) were made up of individuals, and 3,330 (8.1%) had someone living alone who was 65 years of age or older. The average household size was 2.98. There were 30,636 families (74.1% of all households); the average family size was 3.42.

The population was spread out, with 37,406 people (30.1%) under the age of 18, 12,461 people (10.0%) aged 18 to 24, 33,922 people (27.3%) aged 25 to 44, 27,779 people (22.3%) aged 45 to 64, and 12,874 people (10.3%) who were 65 years of age or older. The median age was 31.6 years. For every 100 females, there were 95.2 males. For every 100 females age 18 and over, there were 92.1 males.

There were 44,205 housing units at an average density of 1,218.9 per square mile (470.6/km^{2}), of which 25,380 (61.4%) were owner-occupied, and 15,969 (38.6%) were occupied by renters. The homeowner vacancy rate was 2.6%; the rental vacancy rate was 6.7%. 73,980 people (59.4% of the population) lived in owner-occupied housing units and 49,136 people (39.5%) lived in rental housing units.

=== 2006–2008 ===
According to the 2006–2008 American Community Survey, the racial composition of Visalia was as follows:

- White: 84.0% (Non-Hispanic Whites: 50.0%)
- Black or African American: 2.2%
- Native American: 1.8%
- Asian: 5.0%
- Native Hawaiian and Other Pacific Islander: 0.1%
- Some other race: 7.6%
- Two or more races: 2.9%
- Hispanic or Latino (of any race): 40.6%

African Americans make up 2.2% of Visalia's population. According to the survey, there were 2,574 African Americans residing in Visalia.

Native Americans make up 0.7% of Visalia's population. According to the survey, there were 827 Native Americans residing in Visalia.

Asian Americans make up 5.0% of Visalia's population. According to the survey, there were 5,762 Asian Americans residing in Visalia. The seven largest Asian American groups were the following:

- Other Asian (Cambodian, Laotian, Thai, Hmong, Lahu, Mien, etc.): 2.7% (3,092)
- Vietnamese: 0.7% (804)
- Filipino: 0.5% (597)
- Chinese: 0.4% (500)
- Indian: 0.4% (437)
- Japanese: 0.2% (237)
- Korean: 0.1% (97)

Pacific Islander Americans make up 0.1% of Visalia's population. According to the survey, there were 138 Pacific Islander Americans residing in Visalia.

Multiracial Americans make up 2.9% of Visalia's population. According to the survey, there were 3,350 multiracial Americans residing in Visalia. The four main multiracial groups were the following:

- White & Black: 0.4% (468)
- White & Native American: 0.9% (1,007)
- White & Asian: 0.5% (534)
- Black & Native American: 0.1% (68)

Hispanics and Latinos make up 40.6% of Visalia's population. According to the survey, there were 47,251 Hispanics and Latinos residing in Visalia. The four main Hispanic/Latino groups were the following:

- Mexican: 38.2% (44,397)
- Puerto Rican: 0.2% (177)
- Cuban: 0.1% (91)
- Other Hispanic or Latino (Guatemalan, Salvadoran, Honduran, etc.): 2.2% (2,586)

White Americans make up 84.0% of Visalia's population. According to the survey, there were 97,735 White Americans residing in Visalia. Much of the European American population is of German, Irish, English, Italian, Russian, Polish, and French descent.

According to the 2006–2008 American Community Survey, the top ten European ancestries were the following:

- German: 8.2% (9,486)
- English: 6.4% (7,445)
- Irish: 5.8% (6,726)
- Portuguese: 2.5% (2,983)
- Italian: 2.4% (2,792)
- French: 2.0% (2,278)
- Dutch: 1.6% (1,877)
- Scottish: 1.0% (1,178)
- Scotch-Irish: 0.8% (953)
- Polish: 0.7% (820)

=== 2000 ===
The 2000 census recorded 91,565 people, 30,883 households, and 22,901 families residing in the city, with a population density of 3,203.8 people per square mile. There were 32,658 housing units. As of the 2000 US Census, the racial distribution in Visalia was 54.9% White American, 2.3% African American, 6.0% Asian American, 2.4% Native American, 0.3% Pacific Islander, 20.3% from other races, and 4.2% from two or more races. 35.6% of the population was Hispanic or Latino (of any race).

The census indicated that 70.9% spoke English, 12.1% Spanish, 1.0% Lahu, 0.8% Mien, 0.7% Hmong, 0.6% Laotian and 0.5% Tagalog as their first language.

According to the census, 41.1% of households had children under 18, 54.9% were married couples, 14.9% had a female householder with no husband present, and 25.8% were non-families. 20.7% of households were made up of individuals, and 8.4% had someone living alone who was 65 years of age or older. The average household size was 2.91 and the average family size 3.37.

The age distribution was: 31.3% under 18, 9.6% from 18 to 24, 28.5% from 25 to 44, 19.7% from 45 to 64, and 10.9% who were 65 or older. The median age was 32. For every 100 females, there were 99.4 males. For every 100 females aged 18 and over, there were 88.9 males.

The median income for a household was $53,975, and for a family was $61,823. Males had a median income of $46,423, females $34,265. The per capita income was $23,751. 14.8% of the population and 13.2% of families were below the poverty line. 21.4% of those under the age of 18 and 9.4% of those aged 65 or older were below the poverty line.

=== Religion ===
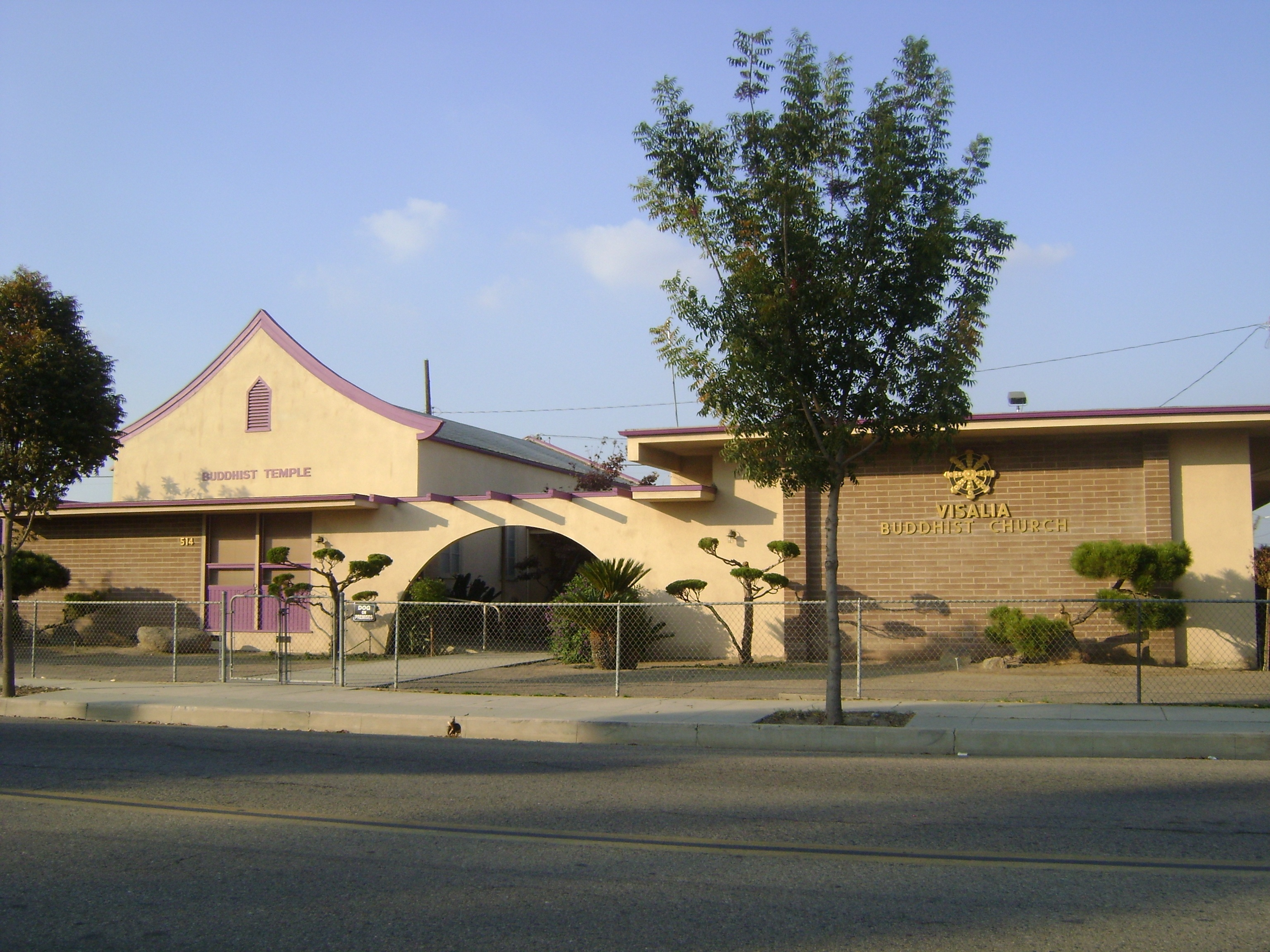
Visalia Buddhist Temple

About 233,293 Christians are in the metropolitan area (85,000 in the city proper). Churches of the Catholic, Methodist, Presbyterian. Lutheran, Baptist, Church of Christ, Assemblies of God, Church of Jesus Christ of Latter-day Saints, Pentecostal, Seventh-day Adventist Church, Eastern Orthodox Church, Oriental Orthodox Church, Mennonite, and other denominations can be found throughout the city. Some of the larger Protestant Christian congregations include Radiant Church, Visalia First Assembly, Neighborhood Church, Gateway Church, Grace Community Church, Christ Lutheran Church, Visalia Christian Reformed Church, Visalia Nazarene Church, and Visalia Community Covenant Church.

In addition, St. Charles Borromeo is the largest Catholic parish church in North America.

== Economy ==
The economy of Visalia is driven by agriculture (especially grapes, olives, cotton, citrus, and nursery products), livestock, and distribution and manufacturing facilities (electronics and paper products are significant manufacturing sectors). Light manufacturing and industrial/commercial distribution represent the fastest growing portion of Visalia's employer base.

=== Top employers ===
According to the city's June 2025 Annual Comprehensive Financial Report, the top employers in the city are:

#	Employer	# of Employees
1	Kaweah Delta Healthcare	5,390
2	Tulare County	3,437
3	Visalia Unified School District	3,339
4	Amazon Fulfillment Center (FAT2 & HLA6)	1,200
5	City of Visalia	910
6	Walmart	836
7	College of the Sequoias	714
8	VF Outdoor Distribution	609
9	California Dairies Inc	490
10	Graphic Packaging	435

== Arts and culture ==
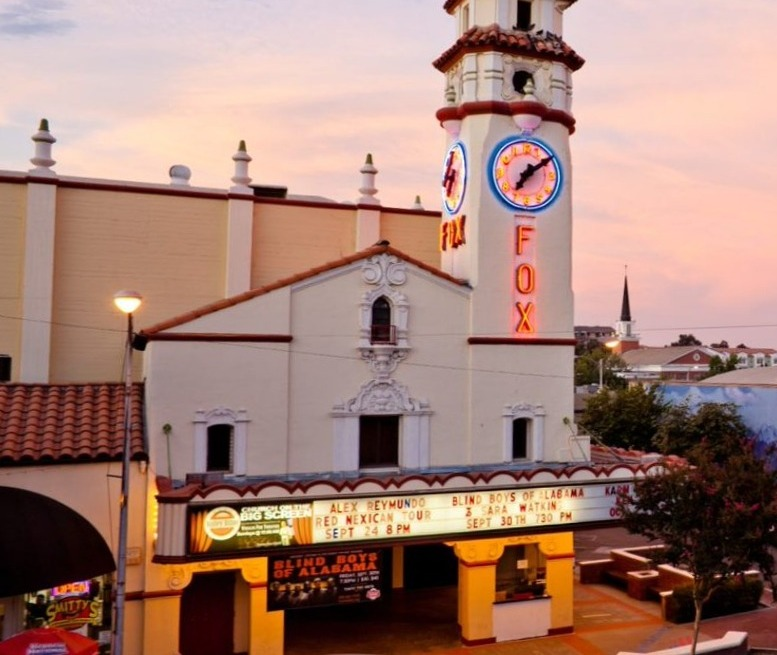
Visalia's Fox Theatre.

The Tulare County Public Library operates its largest branch, the Visalia Branch, in Downtown Visalia. There are other smaller libraries in Visalia, such as the Visalia Learning Center.

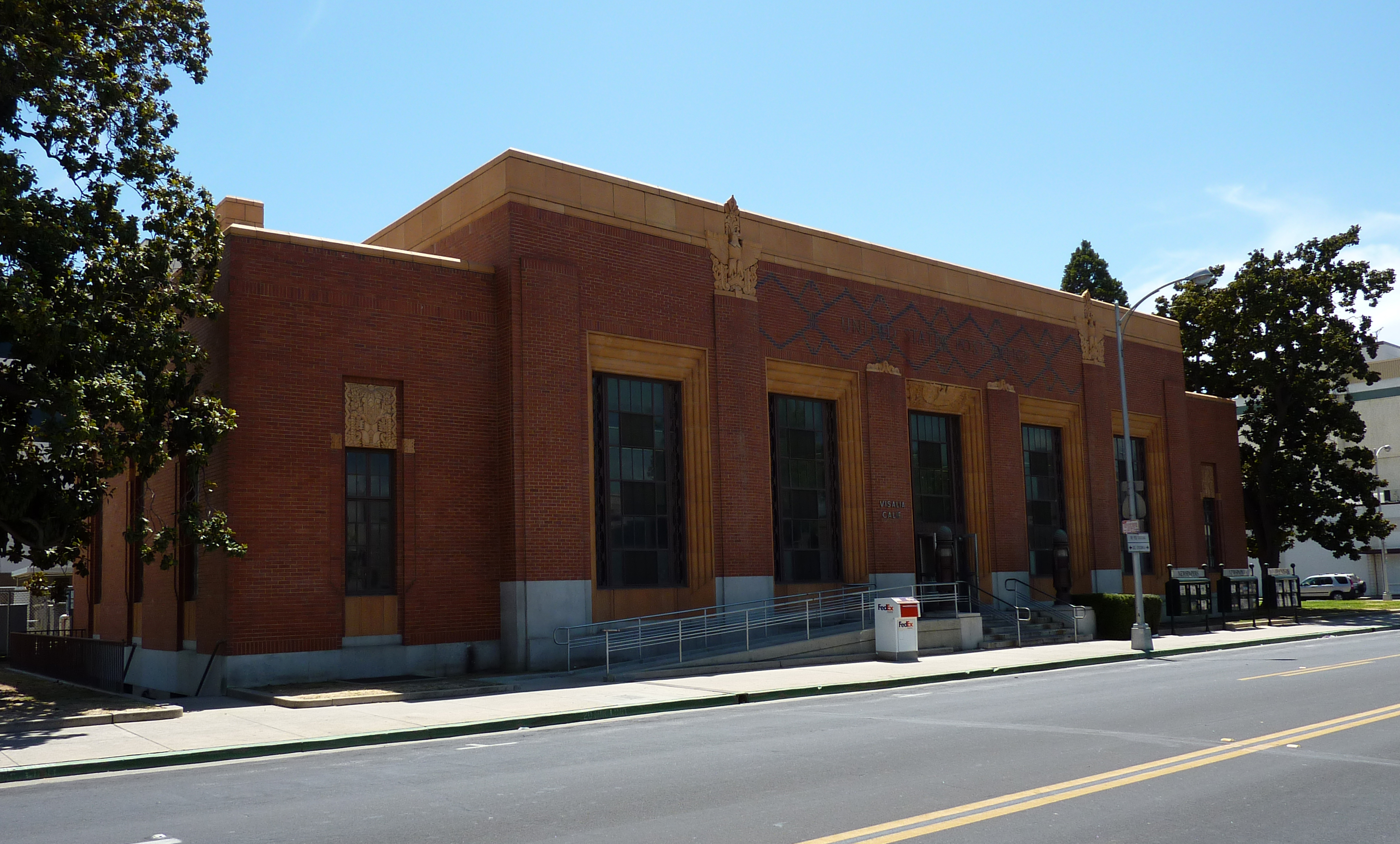
Visalia Town Center Post Office

Historic brick structures include the Bank of Italy, and the Visalia Town Center Post Office, both of which are registered with the National Register of Historic Places. Other historic buildings include the Fox Theatre, used for music and stage performances.

== Sports ==
Visalia is home to the Visalia Rawhide (a "single-A" class team of the Arizona Diamondbacks) of Minor League Baseball. The Rawhide compete in the California League at Recreation Park.

It is also home to the Visalia Vapor Trailers, the longest-active official National Hot Rod Association (NHRA) car club.

== Government ==
=== Local government ===
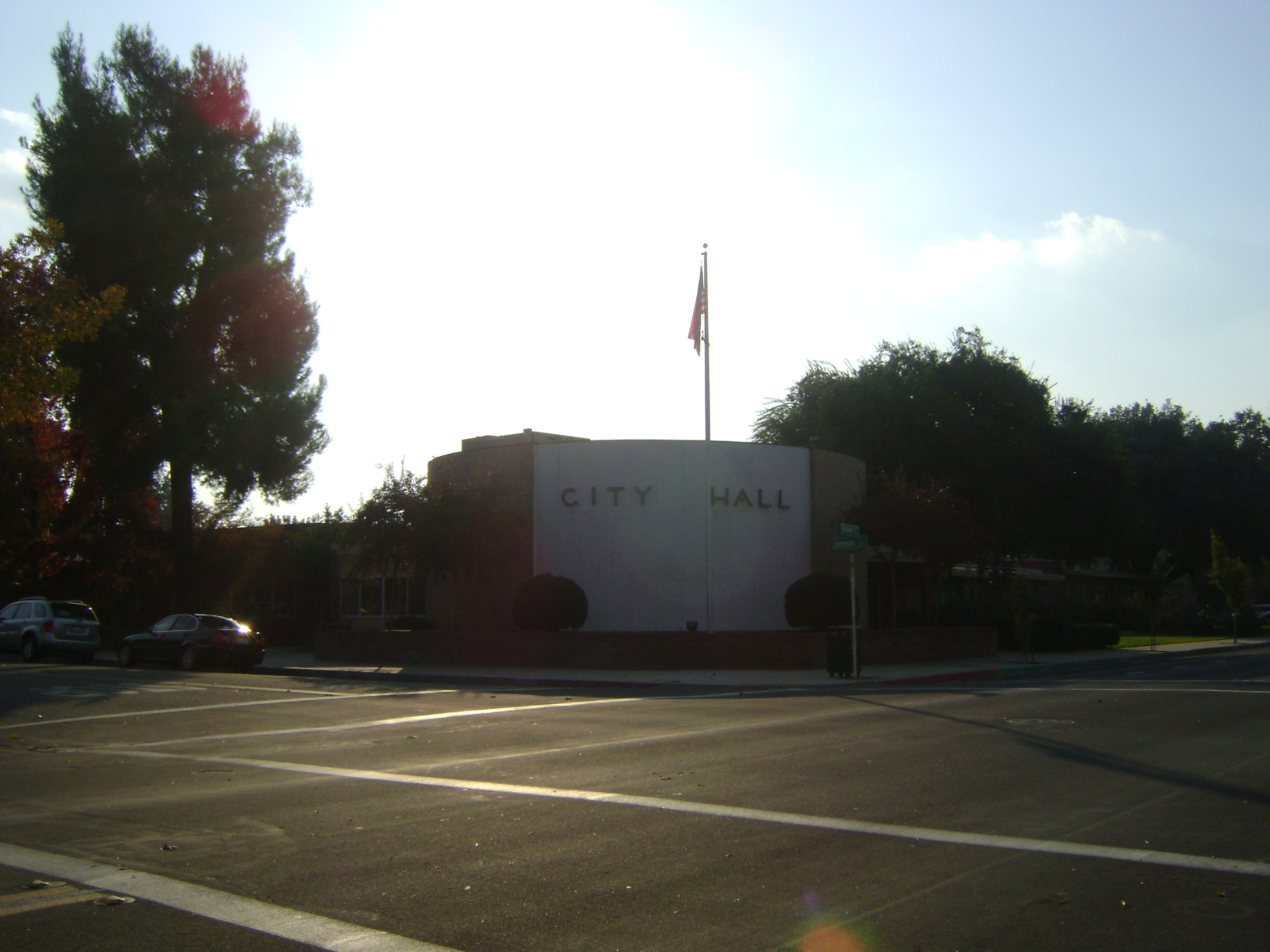
Visalia City Hall

Former Visalia Courthouse on Court Street. Photographed by John Margolies in 2003. Since 2020 it was remodeled into the Darling Hotel.

Like much of the San Joaquin Valley, more resident voters are registered in the Republican Party than the Democratic Party.

Of the 51,718 registered voters in Visalia; approximately 31.9% are Democrats and 49.1% are Republicans. The remaining 19.0% are Independents or are registered with one of the many smaller political parties, like the Green Party or the Libertarian Party.

Visalia is a charter city with a city charter approved by the electorate that acts as a "constitution" for the city. Until the November 2012 elections, Visalia voters elected at large the five-member City Council that serves as the city's legislative and governing body. The city council members serve four-year terms, and they select one member to serve as mayor and one to serve as vice mayor. The City Council hires a powerful city manager that serves as executive officer, administers city operations, and carries out city policies. Every odd-numbered year either two or three members are elected by the people to serve a four-year term. Each March, the City Council meets and chooses one of its members as mayor and one as vice-mayor. The current mayor of Visalia is Bob Link and vice mayor is Steve Nelsen.

The City of Visalia had been threatened with a lawsuit from a network of civil-rights attorneys claiming the city violated the California Voting Rights Act, passed into law in 2002. On March 5, 2012, the Visalia City Council voted to put on the November 2012 ballot an initiative to change the way that Visalia voters elect their city council. The measure passed and, as of the November 2016 elections, Visalia holds district elections in which the candidates must live in one of the five areas (or "districts") forming the city, and only residents of that area cast their votes.

=== List of mayors ===
This is a list of Visalia mayors by year.

- 2003-2005 Bob Link
- 2009-2011 Bob Link
- 2011-2013 Amy Shuklian
- 2016 – 2018 E. Warren Gubler
- 2022-2024 Brian Poochigian
- 2024-Current Brett Taylor

=== State and federal representation ===
In the California State Legislature, Visalia is split between the 12th senatorial district, represented by Republican Shannon Grove, and the 16th senatorial district, represented by Democrat Melissa Hurtado. Visalia is also split between the 32nd Assembly district, represented by Republican Stan Ellis, and the 33rd Assembly district, represented by Republican Alexandra Macedo.

In the United States House of Representatives, Visalia is split between California's 20th congressional district, represented by Republican Vince Fong, and California's 21st congressional district, represented by Democrat Jim Costa.

== Education ==
=== Colleges and universities ===
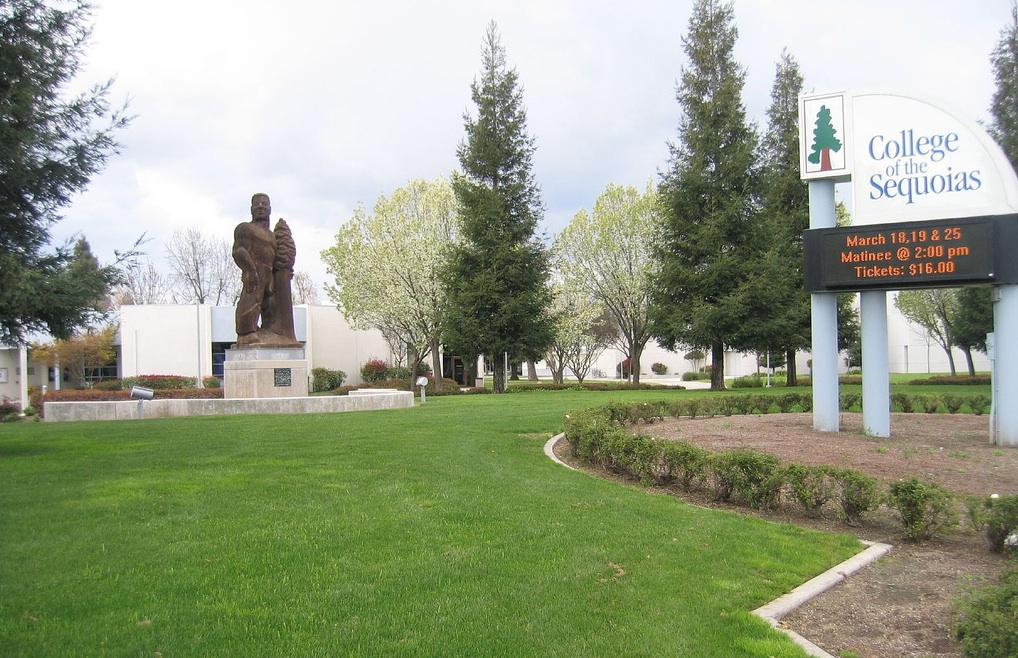
College of the Sequoias

Visalia is the home of the College of the Sequoias, which is a community college. It is the only public college located in Visalia.

Universities with branch campuses located within the city limits:

- Fresno State
- Chapman University
- Fresno Pacific University

Private colleges in Visalia include:

- San Joaquin Valley College
- University of Phoenix

Visalia is the only major city in the Central Valley with a population over 100,000 that does not have a local four-year university.

=== Schools ===
Visalia Unified School District serves almost all of the city of Visalia, while a piece in the south is in the Liberty Elementary School District and the Tulare Joint Union High School District. Visalia USD, which also includes several surrounding communities, has a student population of about 30,000.

== Media ==
The daily newspaper is the Visalia Times-Delta.

== Infrastructure ==
=== Transportation ===
==== Freeways and highways ====
California State Route 99, known as the Pearl Harbor Survivors Memorial Freeway, is the major north–south highway that heads north to Fresno and south to Bakersfield. California State Route 198 runs east to Sequoia National Park and west to San Lucas. California State Route 63, Mooney Boulevard, heads north towards Orosi and Kings Canyon National Park, and south to Tulare. California State Route 216, Lovers Lane, heads east to Woodlake.

==== Public transportation ====
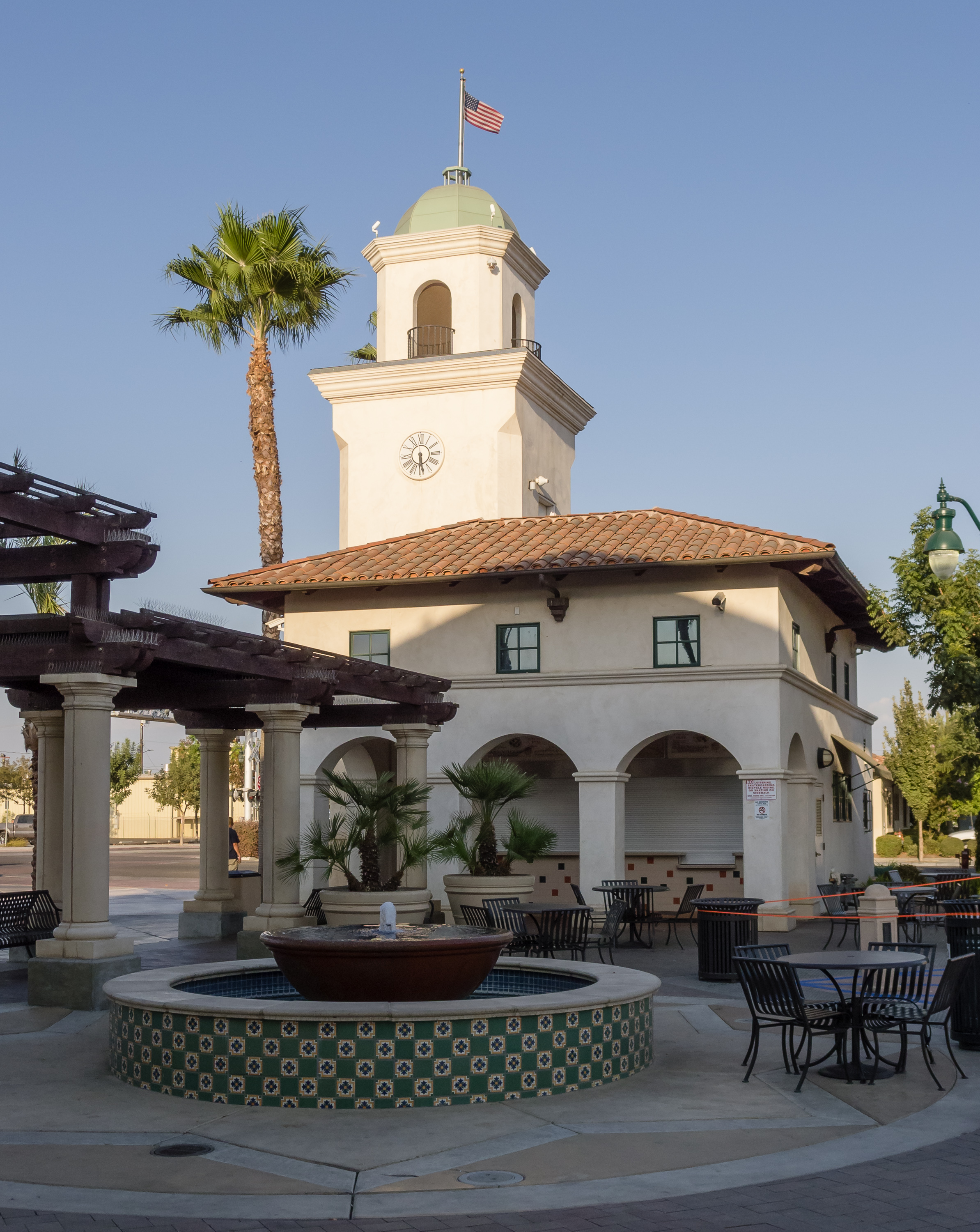
Partial view of Visalia Transit Center

Visalia Transit (formerly Visalia City Coach) operates public transportation to, from and within the communities of Visalia, Goshen, Farmersville and Exeter. The Visalia Transit also provides Dial-A-Ride curb-to-curb para-transit service on a shared-ride, demand-response basis to locations within the city limits of Visalia, Goshen and Farmersville.

Tulare County Area Transit (TCaT) provides the public transit services between Visalia and smaller communities throughout the greater Visalia area. Service includes Fixed Route and Demand Responsive services that are offered Monday through Saturday.

Orange Belt Stages has a bus stop in Visalia for commuting Amtrak rail passengers with Visalia as their final destination.

Amtrak Thruway 18 provides daily connections to the nearest Amtrak station in Hanford. The bus continues on to Santa Maria, with several stops in between.

The Sequoia Shuttle provides an alternative form of transportation from Visalia and Three Rivers to Sequoia National Park.

In late 2015, city officials unveiled the V-Line, a bus that connects Visalia and Fresno. Its stops, in order, are the Visalia Transit Center, Visalia Municipal Airport, Fresno Yosemite International Airport, Fresno State University, and the Fresno Courthouse, which is walking distance to the Fresno Amtrak station. The bus fare is $10 each way. Discounted fares are available for students, seniors, and disabled riders. This bus has amenities such as free WiFi and charging ports.

The California High-Speed Rail Authority has plans to build a high speed rail station 20 miles west of Visalia named Kings–Tulare Regional Station, which will service the city of Hanford as well as Visalia. Originally planned to be at-grade, the High-Speed Rail Authority has now built a viaduct crossing California State Route 198, which the station will be situated atop.

==== Air transportation ====
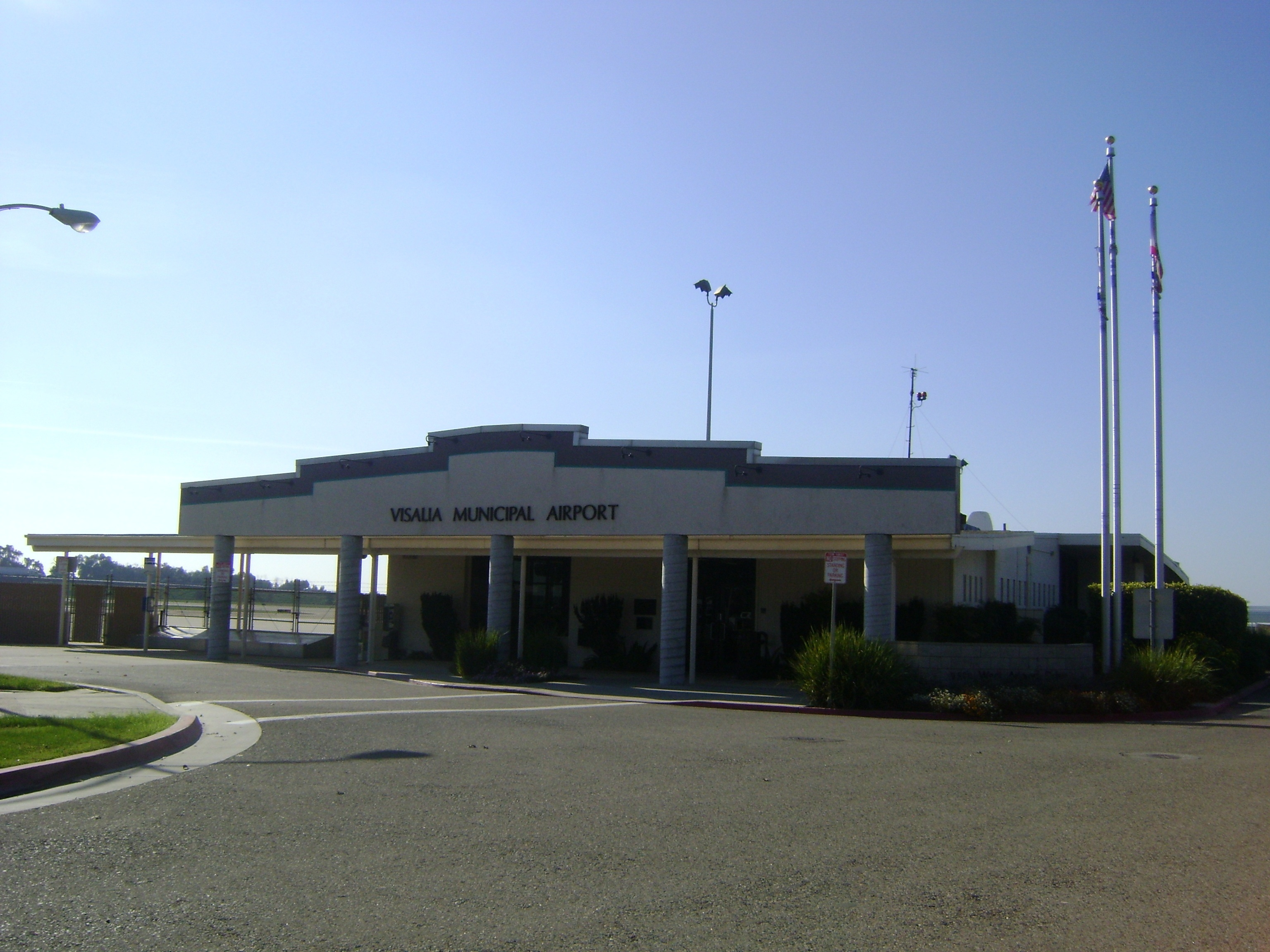
Visalia Municipal Airport

Visalia Municipal Airport is located here.

==== Rail Transportation ====
===== Current =====
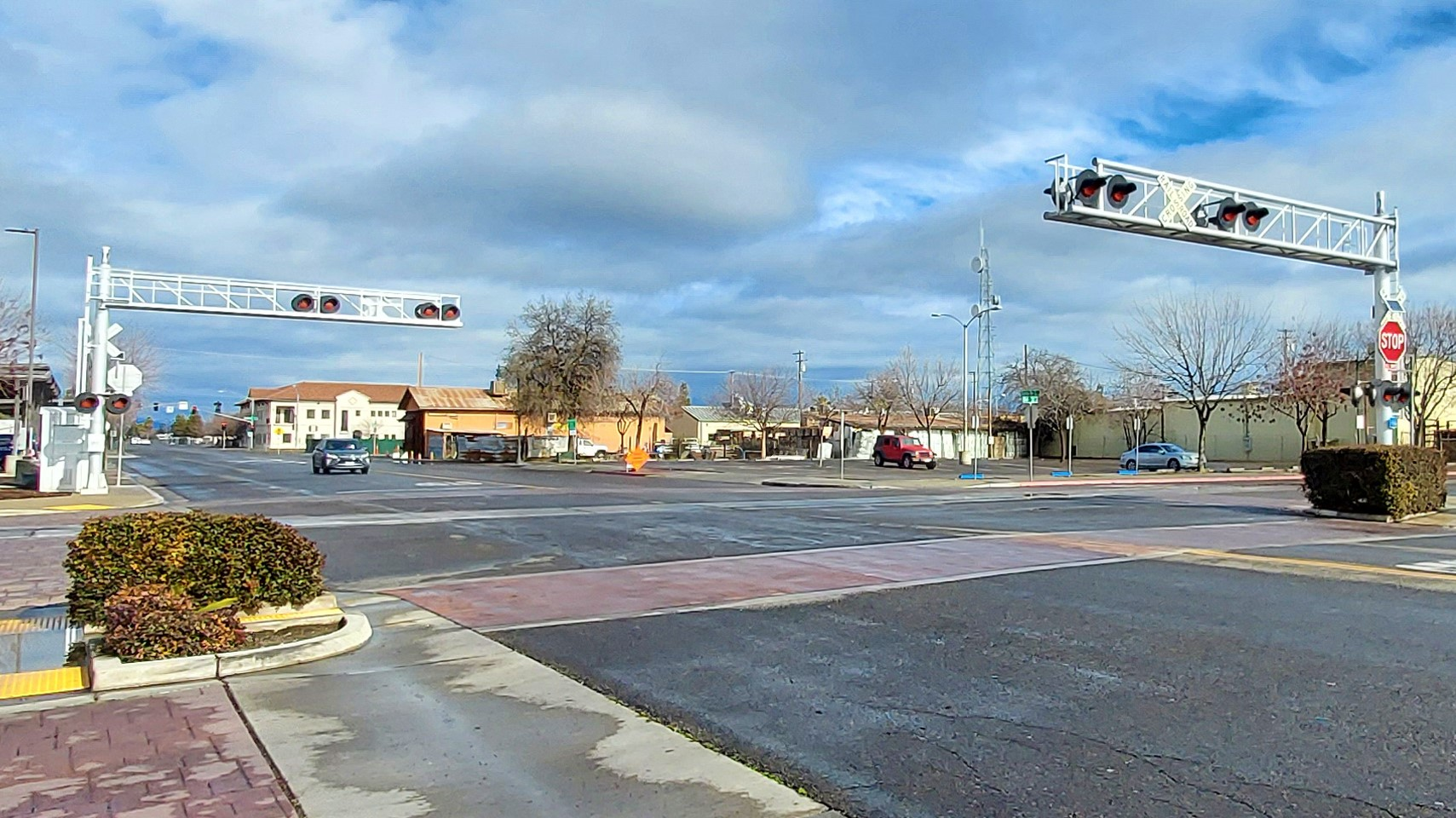
Santa Fe Ave and Oak Ave intersection showing active SJVR (former SP) tracks; former ATSF diamond crossing was also here.

Visalia is currently served by the San Joaquin Valley Railroad as part of its Goshen Subdivision, which runs from Goshen, California (a connection with the Union Pacific Fresno Subdivision) to Exeter, California. This line was originally built by the Visalia Railroad (incorporated May 19, 1874) and was later acquired by the Southern Pacific in 1895. SP sold the line to the SJVR in 1992. The railroad primarily serves the Visalia Industrial Park, on the western side of the city limits.

===== Former =====
The Visalia Electric Railroad ran eastward from the city, and at one time had lines extending to Woodlake and Strathmore, with the line to Woodlake being electrified. The VE was operational from 1906 to 1990, when the line was abandoned and pulled up east of Exeter.

Visalia was formerly a station stop on the Visalia District of the Atchison, Topeka and Santa Fe Railway. A depot and small yard were located in the city. The line was originally built by the San Francisco and San Joaquin Valley Railroad. The portion of this rail line through Visalia was abandoned and removed in 1994.

In 1887, the Visalia and Tulare railroad was established between its two namesake cities. The railroad ceased operations by October 1900, a victim of competition and an accident with a wandering calf on May 7, 1900, which injured several people.

== Sister cities ==
- Putignano, Italy
- Miki, Japan

== See also ==
- Central California
- List of cities and towns in California
