= Venice Hills =

Mountain range in Tulare County, California

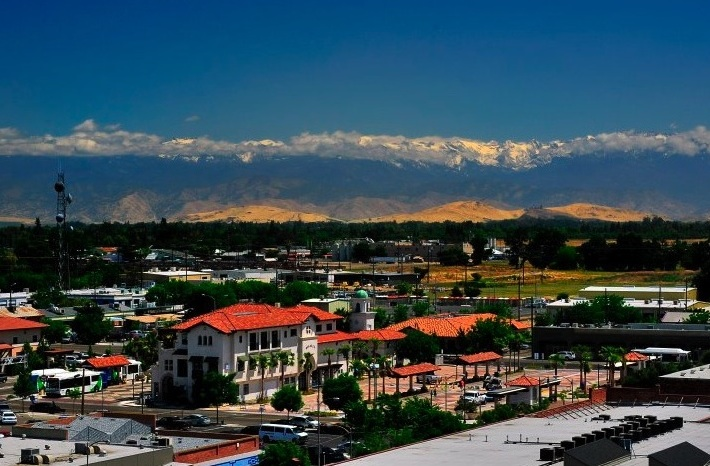

Highest point
- Elevation: 604 ft (184 m)

Geography
- Location within California
- Country: United States
- State: California
- County: Tulare County
- Range coordinates: 36°22′24.820″N 119°10′52.395″W

The Venice Hills are a mountain range in Tulare County, California, along the St. John's River in East Visalia. They are part of the foothills of the Sierra Nevada. The Venice Hills were named for the abundance of streams running through the area.

== Venice School ==
Venice school lies on the southern end of the Venice Hills. It was built in 1898, and is the oldest school in Tulare County that is in use. In 1957, the Venice School District was absorbed into the Ivanhoe School District, and the Venice school was closed. It was preserved until 1996, when it was re-opened as a charter school.
