= Battle of Stone Corral =

1893 gunfight near Visalia, California, US

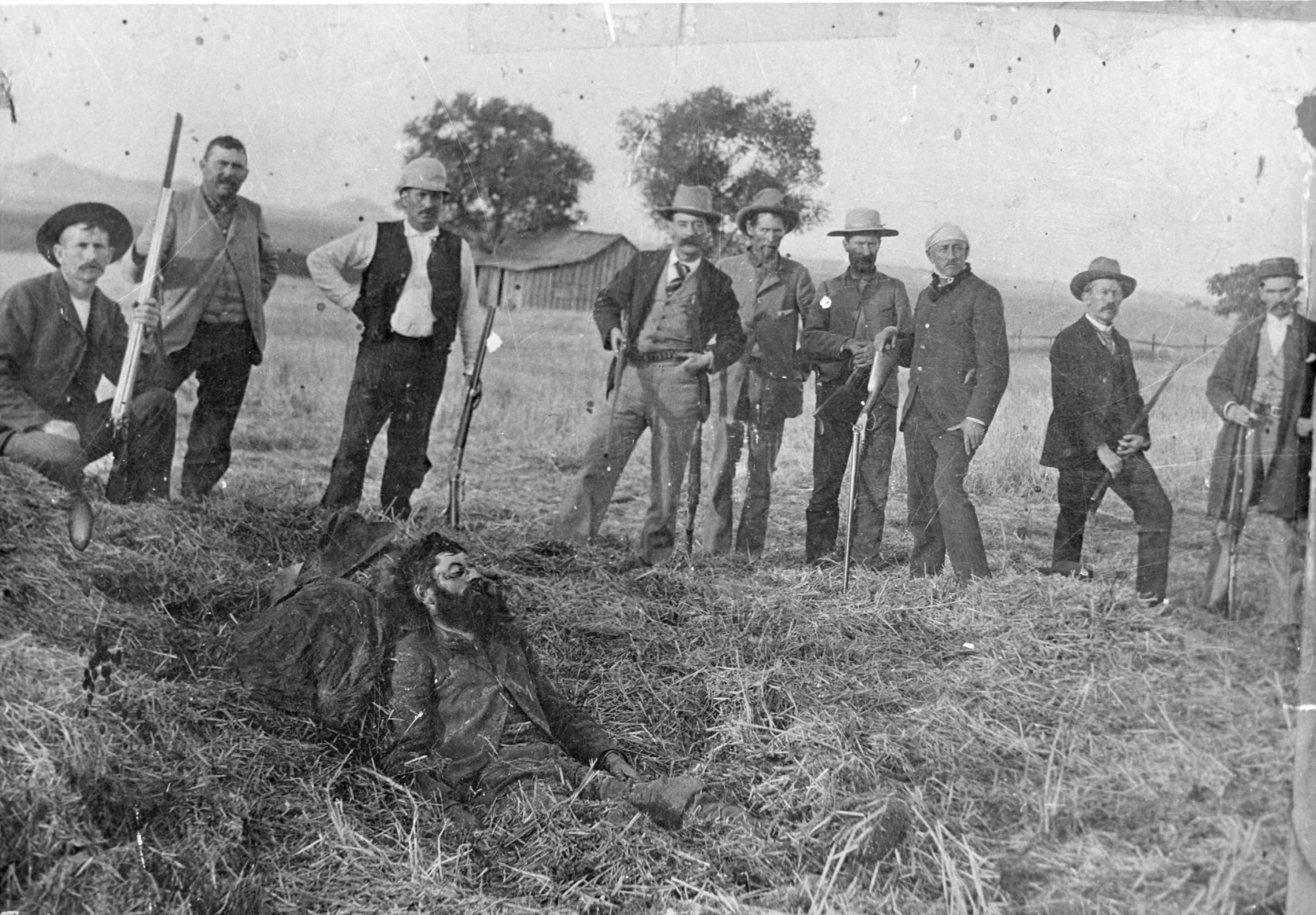
- The wounded John Sontag lying next to the possemen.
- Date: June 11–12, 1893
- Location: 36.513851°N 119.180784°W
- Also known as: Gunfight at Stone Corral
- Participants: Chris Evans; John Sontag
- Outcome: 1 killed 2 wounded

The Battle of Stone Corral, also known as the Gunfight at Stone Corral, occurred in June 1893 and was the final shootout during the pursuit of the Sontag-Evans Gang. After months of searching and several previous encounters, a small posse under the command of Marshal George E. Gard ambushed John Sontag and Chris Evans at a corral near Visalia, California.

== See also ==
- List of Old West gunfights
