= List of schools in Visalia, California =

This is a list of schools in Visalia, California.

== Catholic ==
- George McCann Memorial Catholic School

== Christian (non-denominational) ==
- Central Valley Christian Elementary/Middle School (pre-K - 8)
- Central Valley Christian High School
- Grace Christian School
- St. Paul's School
- Visalia Christian Schools

== Public schools ==
=== Elementary schools ===
- Annie R. Mitchell Elementary School
- Conyer Elementary School
- Cottonwood Creek Elementary School
- Crestwood Elementary School
- Crowley Elementary School
- Elbow Creek Elementary School
- Four Creeks Elementary School
- Golden Oak Elementary School
- Goshen Elementary School
- Highland Elementary School
- Houston Elementary School
- Hurley Elementary School
- Ivanhoe Elementary School
- Linwood Elementary School
- Manuel F. Hernandez Elementary School
- Mineral King Elementary School
- Mountain View Elementary School
- Oak Grove Elementary School
- Pinkham Elementary School
- Riverway Elementary School
- Royal Oaks Elementary School
- Sierra Vista Elementary School
- Veva Blunt Elementary School
- Washington Elementary School
- Willow Glen Elementary School

=== Middle schools ===
- Green Acres Middle School
- Divisadero Middle School
- Valley Oak Middle School
- La Joya Middle School
- Ridgeview Middle School

=== High schools ===
- El Diamante
- Golden West
- La Sierra High School (public charter high school/military academy)
- Mt. Whitney
- Redwood
- University Preparatory High School
- Visalia Technical Early College High School

=== Alternative Schools ===
- Visalia Charter Independent Study
- Sequoia High School
- Crescent Valley Public Charter II
- Charter Alternatives Academy (Packwood)
- Charter Home School Academy
- Midcounty
- Eleanor Roosevelt Community Learning Center
- Sycamore Valley Academy
- Valley Life Charter School
