= Oval Park, Visalia, California =

Oval Park
- Neighborhood
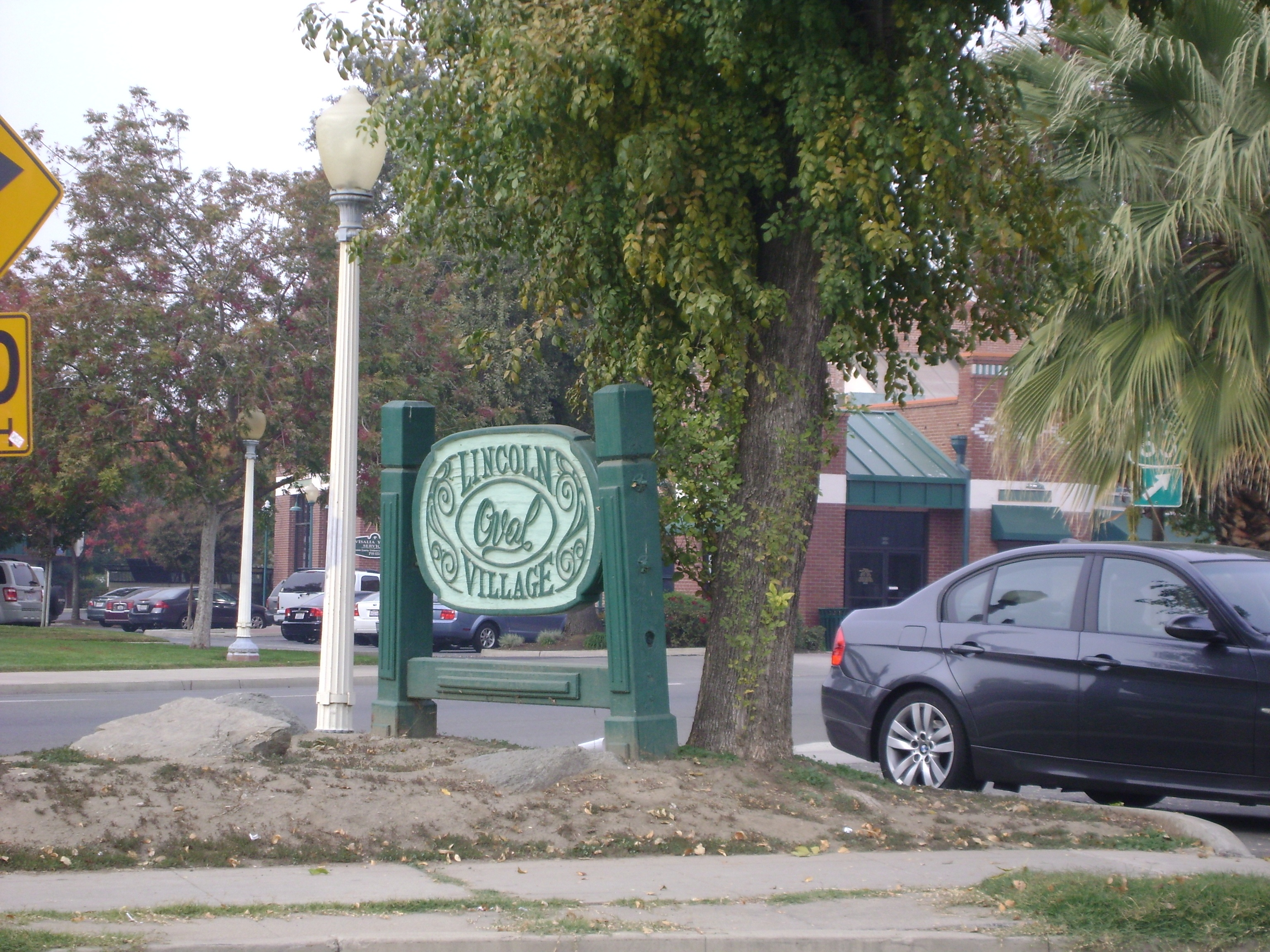
- Lincoln Oval Village
- Nickname: The Oval
- Location in California
- Coordinates: 36°20′18″N 119°17′32.5″W
- Country: United States
- State: California
- County: Tulare County
- City: Visalia
- Elevation: 331 ft (101 m)

Oval Park (also known as Lincoln Oval Village or simply The Oval) is a neighborhood in Visalia, California.

== History ==
Oval Park is Visalia's oldest neighborhood.

The first high school in Visalia was located on what is now the Lincoln Oval Park.

Webster Grammar School was located in the West Village on Northwest Third Avenue near Pearl Street. It opened in 1917. In 1950, the building was declared unsafe as a school and was later converted into a maintenance shop and storage building. In 1961, fire damaged the structure beyond repair. The Visalia Police Department Substation now sits on the site.

== Boundaries ==
According to the Oval Park Historical Society (OPHS) There are no official boundaries for Visalia's Oval Park neighborhood. It is documented that the western part of Oval Park was separated from its eastern section by the construction of highway 63. Also, Murray Avenue cut off a large southern section of the neighborhood on its most southern part. History proves, however, that there are some general boundaries:

Western Boundary: Willis Street

Northern Boundary: Houston Avenue

Eastern Boundary: Santa Fe Street

Southern Boundary: Murray Avenue

Oval Park itself consists, in whole or in part, of the neighborhoods of Oval Park (the area immediately surrounding the park), Visalia Heights, the East Village and the West Village.

== Government and infrastructure ==
=== Local government ===
Visalia Fire Department Station 51 serves the area.

Visalia Police Department operates the District 1 Police Station at 204 NW 3rd Ave, serving the neighborhood.

=== County, state, and federal representation ===
The United States Post Office Town Center Post Office serves the area.

== Education ==
=== Public schools ===
Oval Park is zoned into Visalia Unified School District.

Residents are zoned to Houston Avenue Elementary School and Highland Elementary School.

Most residents are zoned to Green Acres Middle School or Divisadero Middle School.

Residents are zoned to Redwood High School or Mt. Whitney High School.

=== Private schools ===
The Roman Catholic Diocese of Fresno operates George McCann Memorial School, located at 200 East Race Street.

=== Public libraries ===
The Visalia Branch Tulare County Public Library serves the area.
