= Beverly Glen, Visalia, California =

Suburban neighborhood in California, USA

Coordinates: 36.3235°N 119.3098°W

Beverly Glen is a neighborhood in Visalia, California, United States. It is located around Beverly Drive and is bounded by the Sequoia Freeway on the north, Giddings Street on the east, Tulare Avenue on the south, and Mooney Boulevard on the west. Beverly Glen is considered one of the most desirable areas in the city of Visalia, due to its central location and proximity to Downtown, Mooney, and the Sequoia Freeway. Like other affluent areas in Visalia, Beverly Glen sits within a mini oak woodland.

The neighborhood of Beverly Glen is located within the 93277 zip code.

== Education ==
Beverly Glen students are zoned to Visalia Unified School District schools.

- Redwood High School

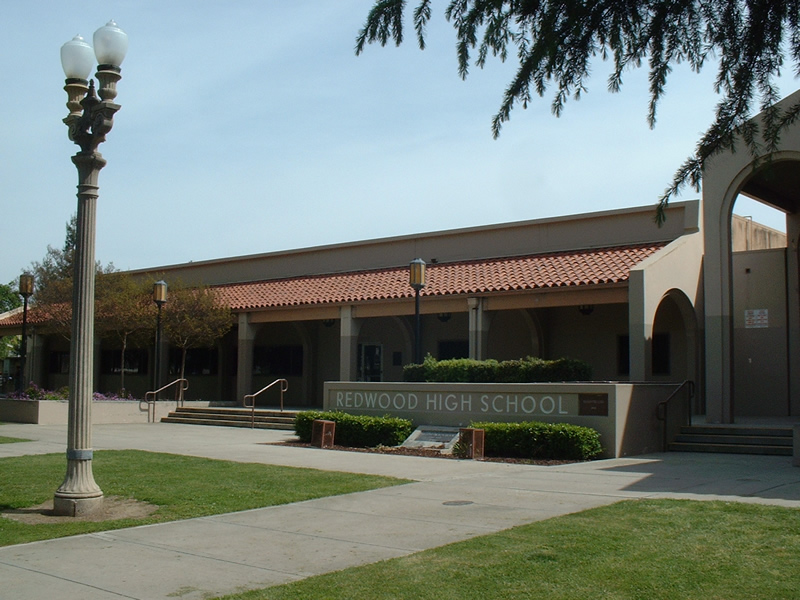
Redwood High School
