= Visalia Heights, Visalia, California =

Visalia Heights
- Neighborhood
- Location in California
- Coordinates: 36°20′8″N 119°17′32.5″W
- Country: United States
- State: California
- County: Tulare County
- City: Visalia
- Elevation: 331 ft (101 m)

Visalia Heights is a third of the Oval Park district of Visalia, California. It is most notable for its impressive well-kept Victorian era residences, although these are small in number.

== Geography ==
Visalia Heights is bordered by the Oval Park on the north, the East Village on the north-east, Santa Fe Street on the east, Downtown Visalia on the south, Highland Park on the west, and the West Village on the north-west. Its boundaries are roughly the Oval Park on the north, NE First Avenue on the north-east, Santa Fe Avenue on the east, Murray Avenue on the south, and West Street on the west. No major thoroughfares run through the district.

== The Neighborhood ==
Visalia Heights is the oldest district in Visalia. It was originally connected to the downtown. Like the Oval Park proper, it is known for its odd intersections with the diagonal streets of the East Village and West Village. The district contains several notable examples of Victorian architecture, particularly of the Eastlake and Queen Anne styles, and though found throughout the neighborhood, they are especially concentrated on Encina Street. Traveling around the neighborhood, one also discovers that many other styles of architecturally significant homes are to be found here, such as Craftsman, Bungalow, Mission Revival, Art Deco, and Colonial Revival, to name a few.

A large swath of Visalia Heights was destroyed to build the apartment complexes.

Visalia Heights is thought to be the City of Visalia's first recognized historic district, or Historic Preservation Overlay Zone (HPOZ).

== Emergency services ==
=== Police service ===
Visalia Police Department operates the District 1 Station, which is located at 204 N.W. 3rd Avenue, 93291. Visalia Heights is located in sector 6.

== Education ==
Visalia Heights is zoned to Visalia Unified School District schools. All students are zoned to Highland Elementary School. Some residents are zoned to either Green Acres Middle School or Divisadero Middle School. Some residents are zoned to either Redwood High School or Mt. Whitney High School.
