= Mooney, Visalia, California =

Region in the city of Visalia, California

Mooney
- Neighborhood
- Interactive map of Mooney
- Coordinates: 36.3098°N 119.3139°W
- Country: United States
- State: California
- County: Tulare
- City: Visalia
- Time zone: UTC−8 (Pacific)
  - Summer (DST): UTC−7 (PDT)

Mooney is a region of the City of Visalia, California.

The Mooney area is north of Tulare, east of County Center Drive, west of Giddings Street and south of Green Acres.

It refers to those areas that are centered on Mooney Boulevard roughly between Main St. and Visalia Parkway.

It is a mix of local and corporate businesses that cluster around Mooney Boulevard. Like the other parts of Visalia, the wealthier neighborhoods of Mooney, such as Beverly Glen, are set within mini Oak Woodlands. On the lower end, around Mooney Grove Park, the area is mostly agriculture.

== Education ==
Mooney is part of the Visalia Unified School District.

=== Higher Education ===
College of the Sequoias is located in Mooney.

== Mooney Boulevard 6-Lane Project ==
A project that will improve traffic operations by increasing the capacity on this segment of State Route 63 through the City of Visalia. Construction will reduce traffic congestion on local streets, improving traffic flow, which will reduce travel times and increase safety for motorists.

This project will upgrade State Route 63 – Mooney Boulevard in the City of Visalia from a four-lane to a six-lane divided highway from Packwood Creek to Noble Avenue. As part of the project, dual left-turn lanes and exclusive right-turn lanes are to be added at four major intersections which include Caldwell, Tulare, Orchard and Beech Avenues. Twenty bus bays are to be built at major intersections and at mid-block locations. Median landscaping are set to follow at the end of the project.

== Mooney Grove Park ==
This park is a large recreational area east of Mooney Boulevard used for everyday activities, parties, and athletic events. Including a Professional Disc Golf (PDGA)course, the Perry Championship Disc Golf Course. The park includes a statue of a dying cavalry Native American replicating James Earle Fraser's sculpture that has become a national icon for Native Americans. In 1915 the sculpture was presented at the San Francisco World Fair that was bought by Tulare County and then bronzed into a durable landmark.

== Attractions ==
- Mooney's Grove Park
- Sequoia Mall
- Visalia Mall
