= Linda Lopez =

Linda Lopez may refer to:

- Linda J. Lopez (born 1948), member of the Arizona Senate
- Linda M. Lopez (born 1964), member of the New Mexico Senate
- Linda Lopez (judge) (born 1968), attorney and jurist
- Linda Nguyen Lopez (born 1981), American artist

== See also ==
- Lynda Lopez (born 1971), American journalist and author, sister of Jennifer Lopez
