= Ben Maddox Way =

Road in Visalia, California, United States

- Maintained by: California Department of Transportation and local government
- South end: Caldwell Avenue
- Major junctions: SR 198 in Visalia
- North end: St. Johns Parkway

Ben Maddox Way is one of the principal north-south arterial roads in Visalia, California, United States. It was named for Benjamin Moyers Maddox (1859 Oct 18, Summerville, GA - 1948 Dec 04, Visalia, CA), editor-publisher of the Visalia Daily Times.

== Overview ==
Running 3.7 miles (6.0 km) from Caldwell Avenue in South Visalia to St. Johns Parkway, just south of the St. John's River in North Visalia, Ben Maddox Way is developed throughout most of its span, with four lanes in width in its entire length. The portions between Caldwell Avenue and Walnut Avenue, Huntington Court and Goshen Avenue, and Houston Avenue and Buena Vista Avenue have a raised center median with Valley Oak trees planted in some parts of the median.

From just south of Main Street to 1/3 of a mile south of Walnut Avenue, Ben Maddox Way runs parallel to the Southern Pacific tracks, which were once part of the Visalia Electric Railroad.

North of the St. John's River, the street becomes the two-lane Road 132, and runs north until it ends at California State Route 201. The entire Ben Maddox Way/Road 132 route connects neighborhoods in Southeast Visalia and East Downtown in Downtown Visalia with the city of Dinuba, and the communities of Cutler and Orosi.

The Ben Maddox overcrossing project, which began in January 2010, is the largest project funded by stimulus funds in Tulare County. It will take the overcrossing from four to eight lanes. It is one of the county's highest-volume intersections. The project is estimated to be completed in 2011.

== Transportation ==
Routes 8A, 8B, and 9 of the Visalia Transit runs along Ben Maddox Way from the Visalia Transit Center in Downtown Visalia.

== Districts and neighborhoods along Goshen Avenue (east to west) ==
- East Visalia
- East Downtown
- Downtown Visalia

== Major intersections ==
The entire route is in Visalia, Tulare County.

mi	km	Destinations	Notes
0	0.0	Caldwell Avenue	
1.1	1.8	Walnut Avenue	
1.7	2.7	Tulare Avenue	
2.1	3.4	Nobel Avenue	
2.1	3.4	SR 198 (Sequoia Freeway)	SR 198 exit 107B
2.2	3.5	Mineral King Avenue	
2.4	3.9	Main Street	
2.7	4.3	Goshen Avenue	
3.2	5.1	Houston Avenue	
3.8	6.1	St. Johns Parkway	
1.000 mi = 1.609 km; 1.000 km = 0.621 mi
