= Green Acres, Visalia, California =

Neighborhood in California, United States of America

Green Acres
- Neighborhood
- Interactive map of Green Acres
- Coordinates: 36.3295°N 119.3214°W
- Country: United States
- State: California
- County: Tulare
- City: Visalia

Green Acres is a neighborhood in Northwest Visalia that is bordered by Downtown Visalia on the east, the Sequoia Freeway on the south, Demaree on the west, and Goshen Avenue on the north. Main Street is the area's principal thoroughfare which divides Green Acres into north and south sections. However, Green Acres can be recognized by the large amount of Valley Oak trees that crowd the banks of Mill Creek. The Visalia Country Club anchors the neighborhood. Homes in the eastern section, often referred to as "Old Green Acres," near North Fairway Street, are typically pre-War II while post-war and mid-century homes approach and cross westerly at North Ranch Street.

== Education ==
=== Primary and secondary schools ===
==== Public schools ====
Residents are zoned to the following Visalia Unified School District schools: Royal Oaks Elementary School, Green Acres Middle School, and Redwood High School.

=== Colleges and universities ===
Green Acres is a few blocks north of the College of the Sequoias.
