= Kaweah Delta Medical Center =

Hospital in California, USA, founded 1963

Coordinates: 36.328006°N 119.294836°W

Kaweah Health Medical Center

Geography
- Location: Visalia, California, United States

Organization
- Type: District

Services
- Emergency department: Level III trauma center
- Beds: 613 (district)

History
- Founded: 1963

Links
- Website: http://www.kaweahhealth.org
- Lists: Hospitals in California

Kaweah Health Medical Center is located in Visalia, California, United States and offers comprehensive health services including cardiac, vascular, colorectal, and general surgery, neurosurgery, oncology, mental health services, orthopedic surgery, adult and neonatal intensive care and pediatrics, and more. It is the largest hospital in Tulare County and Kings County, serving a population of more than 600,000. An elected board of directors governs Kaweah Health.

== Overview ==
Kaweah Health Medical Center has campuses in Tulare and Kings counties serving Visalia and the surrounding Central Valley. Its locations consist of Kaweah Health Medical Center, Kaweah Health South Campus, Kaweah Health West Campus, Kaweah Health Woodlake Health Clinic, Kaweah Health Exeter Health Clinic, Kaweah Health Lindsay Health Clinic, Kaweah Health Dinuba Clinic, Kaweah Health Tulare Clinic, Kaweah Health Medical Foundation, Therapy Specialists, and Sequoia Regional Cancer Center Radiation Oncology locations in Visalia and Hanford.

In total, there are 613 beds in the district: 435 general acute care beds at the main hospital, a 54-bed skilled nursing/subacute facility, a 61-bed acute rehabilitation/short-stay SNF facility, and a 63-bed acute inpatient psychiatric facility. Kaweah Health operates as a non-profit hospital, with less than 1% of funding coming from taxpayers. The Medical Center is a California-designated and American College of Surgeons-verified Trauma Center and serves Tulare County.

== History ==
Kaweah Health North Tower

Kaweah Health (formerly known as Kaweah Delta Medical Center) was formed in March 1961 by a community vote. The Tulare County Board of Supervisors appointed the first governing board. The medical center opened in July 1963, when the Board of Directors leased the former Visalia Municipal Hospital, a 68-bed facility, to provide basic health care to the local community. Kaweah Health Medical Center is still in operation at this site. The original building, constructed in 1936, was in use until a new hospital building, now the Mineral King building, was ready in 1969. In the 1980s, the building footprint was significantly expanded with west and east extensions to accommodate intensive care, labor and delivery, pediatrics, and additional dedicated units. In 2004, the southwest tower along Mill Creek was constructed. It was the site of the Automobile Club of Southern California after it moved from its first office in Visalia in 1941. Kaweah Health's six-floor Acequia Wing opened its doors in 2009, focused on cardiovascular health. It added a new Telemetry Department, Cardiac Surgery and Catheterization Labs, three surgery suites, and a Cardiac Intensive Care Unit. Additionally, the wing added 38 post-delivery rooms for mothers and babies and expanded the Emergency Department, which handles more than 90,000 visits a year. The expanded ED included four state-of-the-art trauma bays, four critical-care beds, eight new treatment rooms, and a helipad. In 2020, the previously shelled-in 5th and 6th floors of the Acequia Wing were opened, adding 24 new intermediate intensive care beds and a state-of-the-art 23-bed neonatal intensive care unit (NICU). In the spring of 2021, Kaweah Health expanded the emergency department, adding 24 new patient rooms to bring the total number of ED rooms to 65, with an additional 8 bays dedicated to expedited care for less-intensive patients. Around this time, Kaweah Delta officially rebranded to Kaweah Health.

In July 2013, Kaweah Health established residency training programs in Family Medicine and Emergency Medicine, followed by a Psychiatry residency program in 2014, Surgery and Transitional Year programs in 2015, and an Anesthesiology residency in 2017. A Child and Adolescent Psychiatry fellowship program was established in 2022. As of the academic year 2024, all Kaweah Health programs are accredited by the Accreditation Council of Graduate Medical Education (ACGME), and include a total of over 100 training positions.
