= East Yosemite League =

High school athletic league in California

The East Yosemite League is a high school athletic league that is part of the CIF Central Section. The membership of the league was restructured in 2022. There is a seasonal selection of All-League players in the scope of sports administered by the league.

== Members ==
- Porterville High School
- Redwood High School (Visalia)
- Monache High School
- El Diamante High School
- Golden West High School
- Mt. Whitney High School
