= Downtown Visalia =

- Neighborhood of the City of Visalia
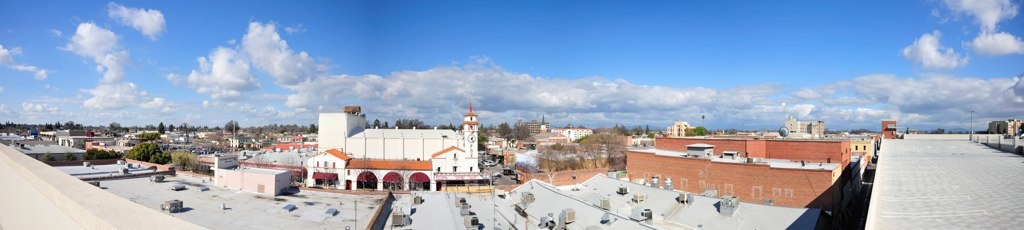
- Downtown skyline during a clear day as seen from the new parking structure, February 2009.
- Interactive map of Downtown Visalia
- Coordinates: 36°19′43″N 119°17′45″W
- Country: United States
- State: California
- County: County of Tulare
- City: Visalia
- Subdistricts of Downtown: List: Arts District; East Main; East Main Extension; Main Street; Medical District; North Downtown; Recreation Park
- ZIP codes: 93291, 93292
- Website: downtownvisalia.com

Downtown Visalia is the central business district of Visalia, California, United States, which is located close to the geographic center of the metropolitan area. The area features an array of public art and unique shopping opportunities. The Downtown area is the hub for the city's public transport transit center.

Downtown is generally thought to be bounded by Giddings Street on the west, Murray Avenue on the north, Ben Maddox Way on the east, and the Sequoia (198) Freeway on the south.

== History ==
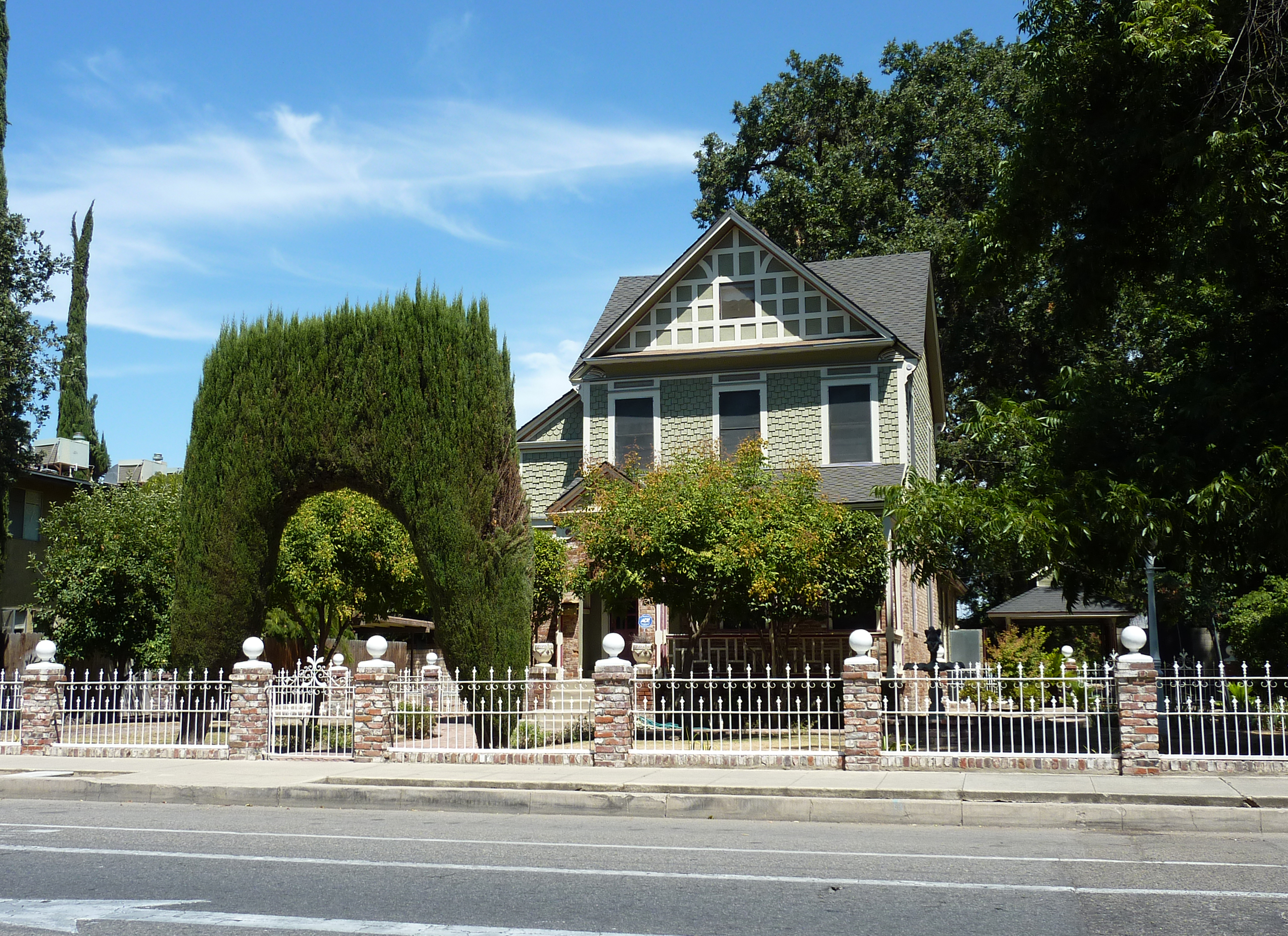
The Hyde House is also on the NRHP.

=== Early years ===
When California achieved statehood in 1850, Tulare County did not exist. The land that is now Tulare County was part of the huge Mariposa County. In 1852 some pioneers settled in the area, then called Four Creeks. The area got its name from many watershed creeks and rivers flowing from the Sierra Nevada Mountains. All the water resulted in a widespread swampy area with a magnificent oak forest. The group of settlers petitioned the state legislature for county status and on July 10 of that same year Tulare County became a reality.

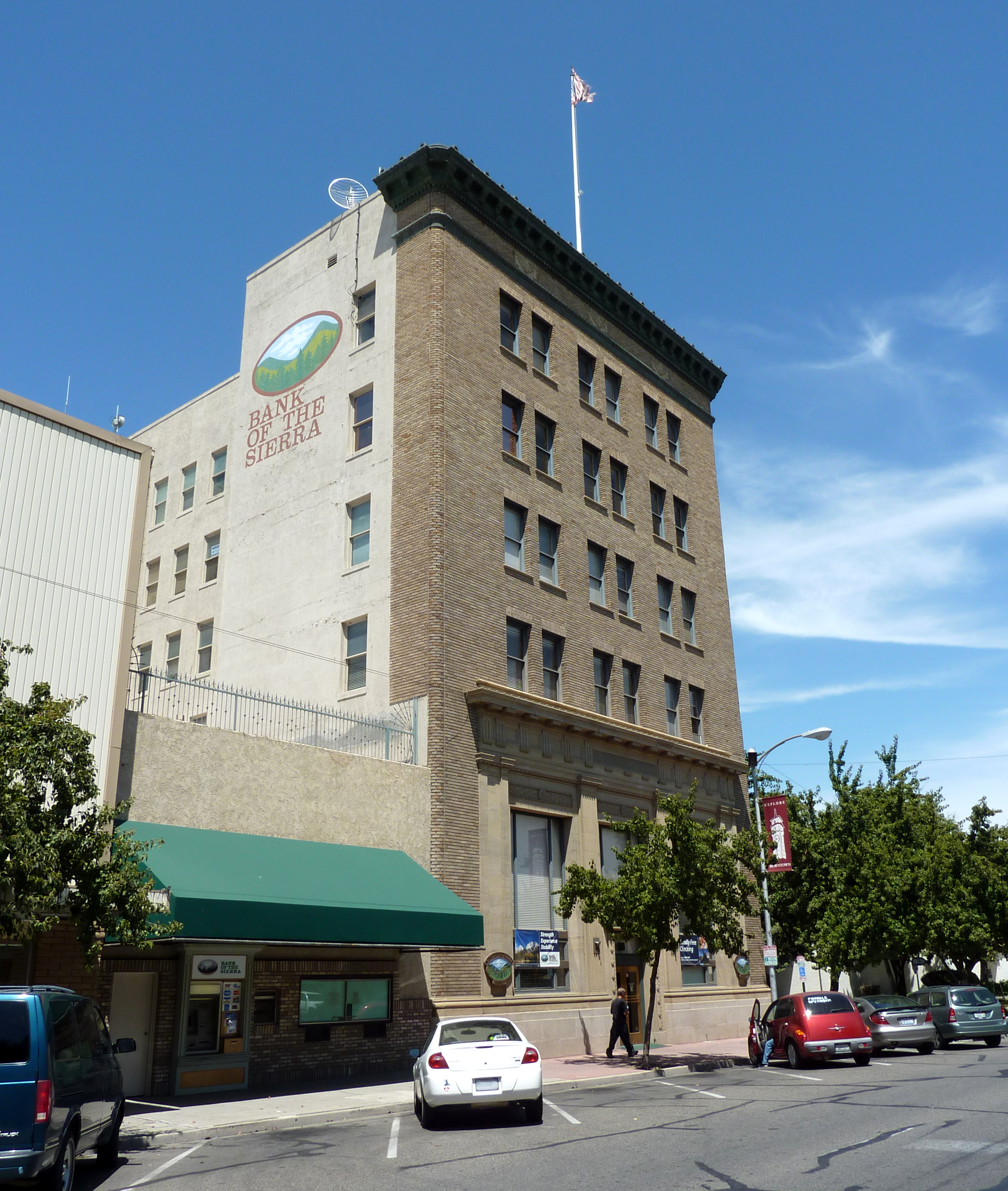
The Bank of Italy building, now the Bank of Sierra, is one of several buildings in Visalia on the National Register of Historic Places (NRHP).

One of the first inhabitants of a fort built by the settlers, unnecessarily as it turns out; to protect themselves from Native Americans was Nathaniel Vise. Nathaniel was responsible for surveying the new settlement. In November 1852 he wrote, "The town contains from 60-80 inhabitants, 30 of whom are children of school age. The town is located upon one of the subdivisions of the Kaweah (River) and is destined to be the county seat of Tulare.” In 1853 that prediction became a reality and Visalia has remained the county seat since that time.

Visalia is thought to be named for Nathaniel Vises' ancestral home, Visalia, Kentucky. Early growth in Visalia can be attributed in part to the gold rush along the Kern River. The gold fever brought many transient miners through Visalia along the way and when the lure of gold failed to materialize, many returned to Visalia to live their lives and raise families.

In 1858, Visalia was added to John Butterfield's Overland Stage route from St. Louis to San Francisco. Included in the early crop of citizens were some notorious and nasty individuals who preyed upon the travelers along the Butterfield Stage route. Many saloons and hotels sprouted up around the stage stop downtown and commerce was brisk if a bit risky.

The next memorable event was the arrival of the telegraph in 1860. Visalians then could get timely information of the events taking place on the East Coast which would ultimately develop into the American Civil War.

During the American Civil War many citizens of Visalia couldn't decide whether Visalia should stand on the side of the North or the South, so they simply had a Mini Civil War of their own on Main Street. No one really knows the outcome of the war, but apparently it was concluded to the satisfaction of the participants and life returned to normal.

The federal government however, was not so easily convinced and reacting to concern about sedition banned Visalia's pro-south Equal Rights Expositor newspaper and established a military garrison. Camp Babbitt was built in 1862 to stop overt southern support as well as maintain law and order in the community. During these Civil War years, Visalia was incorporated which gave the town new rights. The second incorporation in 1874 moved Visalia into city status with a common council and an ex officio Mayor and President.

== Attractions ==
- Recreation Park
- Main Street
- Visalia Playhouse Theatre
- Garden Plaza
- Visalia Rawhide
- Candy Cane Lane Parade
- Visalia Convention Center

== Transportation ==
=== Public transportation ===
The Transit Center serves passengers for the City Coach Service that circulates to in-town business and shopping areas; the Tulare County Area Transit system which serves outlying cities and hamlets; and bus service to the Amtrak station in Hanford is available.

The Visalia Towne Trolley provides cheap downtown shuttle service from 7:30 a.m. to 5:30 p.m. Monday thru Thursday; from 7:30 a.m. to 11 p.m. Friday; and on Saturday from 9:30 a.m. to 11 p.m. The price is now set at $0.25 for the Trolley, a price hike from the "free" status it has had for years. The Towne Trolley's includes the Transit Center, the Courthouse, hotels and The Convention Center, arriving at each stop every 15 minutes.

== City scape ==
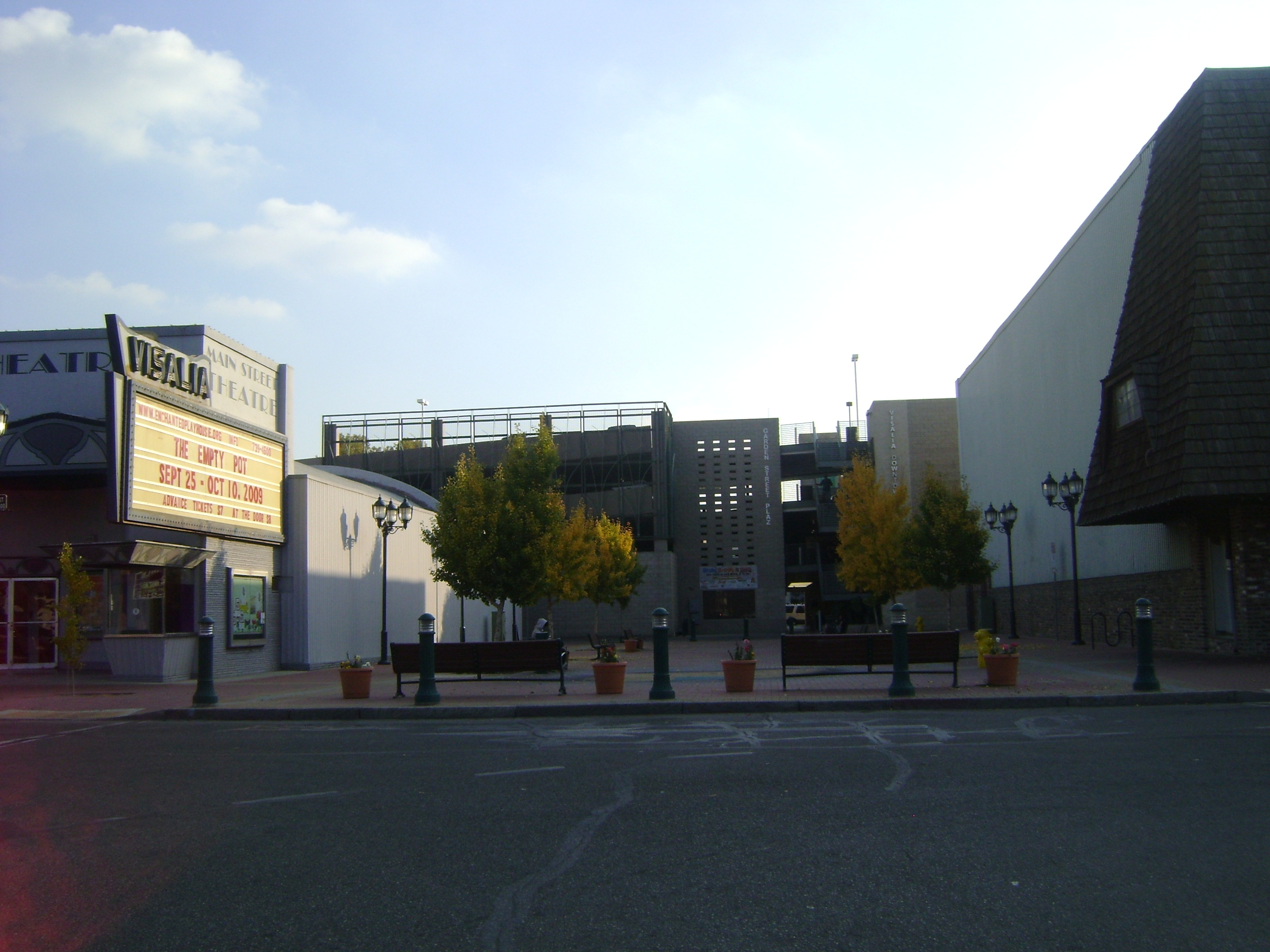
Garden Plaza

=== Parks and open space ===
Downtown Visalia is home to several public parks, plazas, gardens and other open space:

- Garden Plaza
- Memorial Park
- Mayors Park
- Mill Creek Linear Park
- Recreation Park

Kaweah Delta Medical Center office along Mill Creek

=== Skyline ===
Despite its centralization, Visalia has a relatively small skyline, but development has grown in recent years and continues to grow.

Visalia's skyline consists mostly of medium-rise buildings. The tallest building in Visalia is the north tower of the Kaweah Delta Medical Center. It is 6 stories and 105 feet tall.

The city has plans to construct even more medium rise buildings in the future. However, there are no plans for any high-rise buildings.

Some examples of medium-rise buildings include:

- 115 W Murray Ave, an 8-story residential tower that measures 88 feet tall.
- 300 S Court, an 8-story hotel.
- 128 E Main St, a 5-story mix-use.
- 205 S West St, a 5-story office building

== Education ==
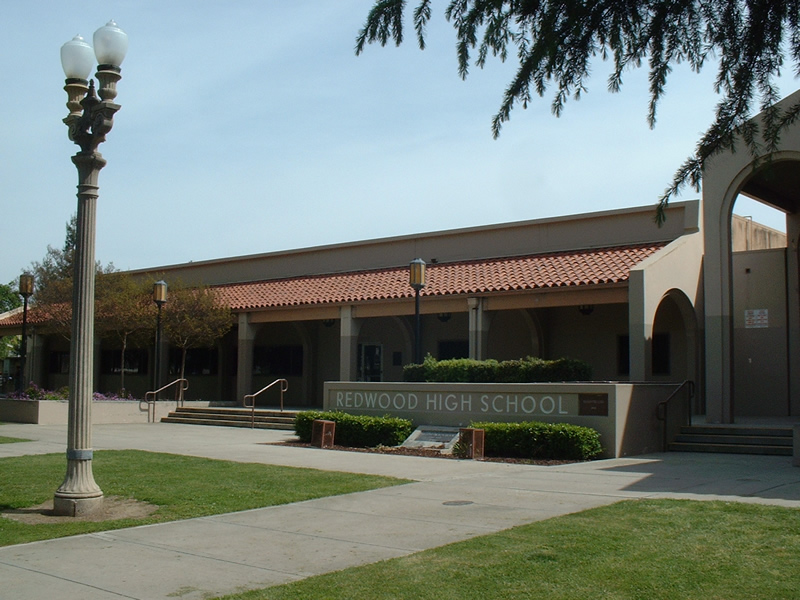
Redwood High School

=== Primary and secondary education ===
Downtown is served by the Visalia Unified School District.

- Redwood High School
