= Packwood Creek =

- Location of Packwood Creek in California

Location
- Country: United States
- State: California
- County: Tulare County

Physical characteristics
- Source
  - location: Visalia, California
  - coordinates: 36°20′12″N 119°13′23″W
  - elevation: 272 ft (83 m)
- Mouth
  - location: Tulare, California, United States
  - coordinates: 36°15′42″N 119°25′58″W
  - elevation: 272 ft (83 m)

Packwood Creek is one of the four main creeks that flow through the city of Visalia and the surrounding communities. It is a distributary of the Kaweah River.

== History ==
Packwood Creek was named after Elisa Packwood.

== See also ==
- Cameron Creek
- Mill Creek (Tulare County)
- St. John's River (California)
