= Visalia Convention Center =

- Interactive map of Visalia Convention Center
- Address: 303 E. Acequia & Bridge.
- Location: Visalia, California
- Coordinates: 35.372°N 119.013°W
- Owner: City of Visalia

Construction
- Built: 1972 - 1973
- Expanded: 1980s, 1990s
- Construction cost: $4.5 million

Website
- http://www.ci.visalia.ca.us/depts

The Visalia Convention Center is a performing arts center and convention center in Visalia, California. The center was founded in 1972. The center is situated at the heart of Central California and is considered one of the premier mid-state conventions in California's Central Valley. The Visalia Convention Center was designed and built to accommodate nearly any event requirements. The center has 114,000 square feet of meeting space and can hold up to 3,000 people. The center is located in Downtown Visalia, at the corner of E. Acequia & Bridge. The center sits in walking distance of 45 locally owned restaurants, shops and the convention Center also has its own resort at the convention center called the Visalia Marriott Hotel & Resort.

== Accreditations ==
In October 2020, during the COVID-19 pandemic, the Visalia Convention Center was awarded the Global Biorisk Advisory Council STAR accreditation. This accreditation indicates the facility's preparedness for biorisk prevention and containment.

== YouTube ==
66th International DX Convention Banquet, 2015

Heart Beat Showdown 3

== See also ==
- List of convention centers in the United States
