= Goshen Avenue =

Road in Visalia, California, United States

- Maintained by: California Department of Transportation
- West end: SR 99 / Commercial Road in Goshen
- Major junctions: SR 63; SR 216
- East end: Lovers Lane in East Visalia

Goshen Avenue /ˈɡoʊʃən/, also known as Murray Avenue, is one of the principal east–west arterial roads in Visalia, California, United States. It was named after the community of Goshen. The name has a biblical origin and generally has come to mean "land of plenty."

== Overview ==
Running 8.9 miles (14.3 km) from Lovers Lane in East Visalia to Highway 99 in the district of Goshen, Goshen Avenue is developed throughout most of its span, connecting neighborhoods in West Visalia and East Visalia to Downtown Visalia. Goshen Avenue follows a railroad spur line that connects Goshen to Visalia.

The avenue is four lanes in width from Giddings Street to Road 76, and the portion between Demaree Road and Road 76 has a raised center median with Valley Oak trees planted in the median.

At Goshen Avenue's western end, its interchange with Highway 99 was demolished c. 2018 after the highway was widened; traffic must now take alternative routes to get onto Highway 99.

== Transportation ==
Route 6 of the Visalia Transit runs along Goshen Avenue from the Visalia Transit Center in Downtown Visalia to Highway 99 and Goshen.

Traveling on Goshen Avenue can often be difficult, as it is one of the main thoroughfares for West Visalia residents to Downtown Visalia. Goshen Avenue often experiences greater traffic when commuters want an alternate route to the Sequoia Freeway. Nevertheless, throughout the months of August to June (when VUSD school's are in session), congestion can be high. During the school year, the best time to travel on Goshen Avenue is between 11:00 AM–2:00 PM. Alternate routes to Goshen Avenue include Ferguson Avenue, a newer road that can be accessed at Mooney Boulevard.

== Districts and neighborhoods along Goshen Avenue (east to west) ==
- East Visalia
- East Downtown
- Downtown Visalia
- Visalia Heights
- Green Acres
- Hyde Park
- The Lakes
- Industrial Park
- Goshen

== Points of interest along Goshen Avenue (west-east) ==
- Recreation Park

== Major intersections ==
The entire route is in Tulare County.

Location	mi	km	Destinations	Notes
Goshen	0	0.0	Commercial Road	Continuation beyond SR 99
Goshen	0	0.0	SR 99 (Pearl Harbor Survivors Memorial Freeway)	Interchange demolished c. 2018 during SR 99 widening; former SR 99 exit 98A
Visalia	1.4	2.3	Plaza Drive	
Visalia	2.9	4.7	Shirk Road	
Visalia	3.9	6.3	Akers Street	
Visalia	4.9	7.9	Demaree Road	
Visalia	7.1	11.4	SR 63 south (Locust Street)	One way street
Visalia	7.1	11.4	SR 63 north (Court Street)	One way street
Visalia	7.4	11.9	Santa Fe Street	
Visalia	7.9	12.7	Ben Maddox Way	
Visalia	8.9	14.3	SR 216 (Ivanhoe Highway) – Ivanhoe	
1.000 mi = 1.609 km; 1.000 km = 0.621 mi: Closed/former; Incomplete access
