= Scott Allen Shaver =

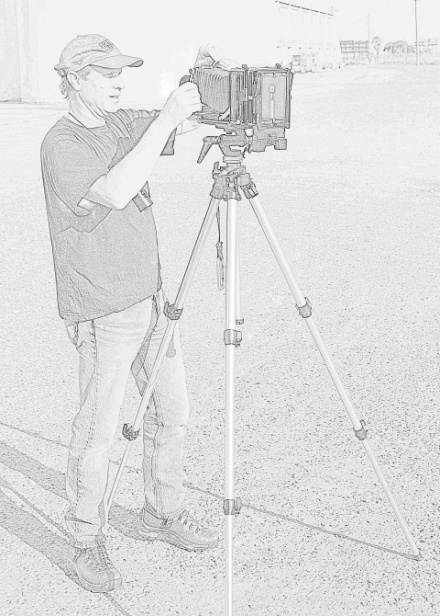
Scott Shaver setting up 4x5 camera.

Scott Allen Shaver is a manager, a civil engineer and a fine art photographer.

== Personal life ==
Born in Sylmar, California and educated in Sylmar public schools through Sylmar High School until he moved with his parents to Visalia, California, where he graduated from Mt. Whitney High School. He earned a Bachelor of Science degree in Civil Engineering, and a Master of Science degree in Civil Engineering and a Master of Business Administration with Distinction, at California State University, Fresno. He married, raised two daughters, and is now divorced.

== Photographer ==
He is primarily a fine art photographer, and has provided photographs for insurance, construction, architectural and law firms. He has been a wedding photographer and a developer of portfolios for models. He has developed and taught numerous workshops.

He developed his photography skills from his father, learned about style and lighting from a book by Yousuf Karsh, and was mentored by the photography teacher Jack White. He studied landscape photography with John Sexton, Ansel Adams' assistant. He and Lucien Clergue conducted a workshop in Death Valley, California.

His three major exhibitions are:

- Fresno Portraits exhibited twenty-seven portraits of more than fifty influential citizens of Fresno, California.
- Faces of Hanford exhibited forty portraits of civic and business leaders who were important to the town of Hanford, California.
- Portraits of Tulare exhibited thirty-eight portraits of community leaders in Tulare, California.

Other themes in Scott's work include landscapes, figure work, fashion, and details of found objects. Scott produces much of his work in large format black and white images, and in medium format color and black and white images. Throughout his work, Scott aims for simplicity and boldness of image, purity of technical means, and brightness of colors when they are used

== Graphic Artist ==
He has studied art formally in community college classes. He independently experiments in painting, sketching, printmaking and nonrepresentational modern art. He has exhibited his work in community college and work-related contexts.

He and his daughters produced their family exhibition, Familial Strokes.

== Exhibitions 1988-2004 ==
He has participated in more than 130 Exhibitions. One of his photographs, Tree and Sunset, was accepted as a mural on State Route 99 in Fresno.

Dates	Title	Location
20 March 1988 – 10 April 1988	Artist of the Month	Spectrum Gallery, Fresno, CA
22 March 1992 – 29 March 1992	A Visual Symphony in Four Movements	Spectrum Gallery, Fresno, CA
10 November 1993 – 9 January 1994	Fresno Portraits	Fresno Art Museum, Fresno, CA
2 September 1994– 2 October 1994	The Order in Nature	Spectrum Gallery, Fresno, CA
15 February 1995 – 19 March 1995	Natural Form	Cort Gallery, Three Rivers, CA
18 September 1995 – 3 November 1995	Landscapes	Fresno City Hall, Fresno, CA
September 1995	Scott Shaver	Henry Madden Library, California State University, Fresno, CA
September 1995	Scott Shaver	Visalia Convention Center, Visalia, CA
September 1995	Scott Shaver	Tulare Historical Museum, Tulare, CA
1 May 1996 – 2 June 1996	Exquisite Visions	Sierra Picture Framers, Visalia, CA
27 July 1996 – 25 August 1996	Annual Members Exhibition	Spectrum Gallery, Fresno, CA
6 October 1996 – 3 November 1996	1996 Invitational/Guest Artist Exhibition	Spectrum Gallery, Fresno, CA
6 October 1996 – 24 November 1996	Faces of Hanford	Kings Art Center, Hanford, CA
14 November 1997 – 18 January 1998	Faces of Tulare	Tulare Historical Museum, Tulare, CA
13 November 1998 – 4 January 1999	Scott Shaver	Merced Multicultural Arts Center, Merced, CA
28 August 1999 – 26 September 1999	Yosemite Renaissance XIV	Kings Art Center, Hanford, CA
7 January 2000 – 4 March 2000	Spectrum Gallery Special Museum Exhibit	Tulare Historical Museum, Tulare, CA
20 April 2001 – 20 May 2001	A Retrospective of Explorations—Five Exhibitions in One	Spectrum Gallery, Fresno, CA
1 November 2001 – 30 November 2001	Special Exhibit from the Big Fresno Fair Fine Arts and Photography Exhibits	Fresno City Hall, Fresno, CA
9 November 2001 – 30 December 2001	Scott Shaver: Pursuit of Passion	Tulare Historical Museum, Tulare, CA
10 June 2004 – 18 July 2004	Inspiration: The Shaver Family	Tulare Historical Museum, Tulare, CA
