= Golden West High School =

Public high school in Visalia, California

Location
- 1717 North McAuliff Street; Visalia, California 93292; United States; 36°20′42″N 119°15′12″W

Information
- Type: Public
- Motto: Home of the Trailblazers
- Established: 1980
- School district: Visalia Unified School District
- Principal: Joaquin Guadiana
- Teaching staff: 89.24 (FTE)
- Grades: 9 - 12
- Enrollment: 2,009 (2023-2024)
- Student to teacher ratio: 22.51
- Colors: Brown & Gold
- Athletics conference: East Yosemite League
- Mascot: Trailblazer
- Website: goldenwest.vusd.org

Golden West High School is a four-year public high school in the Visalia Unified district of Visalia, California. It is one of eight city high schools and enrolls the third highest number of students.

== Academics ==
Golden West offers 13 AP and four honors courses. In the 2018–2019 academic year, the average ACT score was 21 and the average SAT score was 59.2%. In the 2019–2020 academic year, about 61% of students were eligible for free lunch (compared to the state average of 53%), and about seven percent were eligible for reduced lunch (compared to the state average of seven percent).

In the 2018–2019 academic year, the graduation rate was 96%. Sixty-six percent of 2018 graduates attended two-year colleges or vocational schools; 19% attended four-year universities; seven percent entered the workforce; and four percent went into the military.

== Extracurriculars ==
=== Athletics ===
Golden West offers eight boys sports (cross country, water polo, football, basketball, soccer, golf, tennis, baseball), nine girls sports (cross country, golf, tennis, volleyball, water polo, basketball, soccer, softball, flag football), and three co-ed sports (wrestling, track, swimming).

=== Clubs ===
Golden West offers total 20 clubs, including academic clubs, cultural clubs, and athletic clubs. Students can participate in preexisting clubs or apply to create their own clubs on campus. The Future Business Leaders of America (also known as FBLA) club competed in and placed first in several events at the 2021 Central Section Leadership Conference, including Entrepreneurship, Hospitality & Event Management and Marketing.

== Student body ==
Golden West is a Title I public school with a majority Hispanic population.

Race/Ethnicity as of the 2019-2020 School Year
Group	Number of Students	Percentage
Total	1,871	100%
Hispanic	1,380	73.757%
White	334	17.851%
Asian	73	3.902%
Two or More Races	57	3.046%
Black	14	0.748%
American Indian/Alaska Native	11	0.588%
Native Hawaiian/Pacific Islander	2	0.107%

Gender as of the 2019-2020 School Year
Group	Number of Students	Percentage
Total	1,871	100%
Male	1,001	53.501%
Female	870	46.499%

== Notable alumni ==
- Shane Costa, professional baseball player for the Kansas City Royals
- Beau Mills, professional baseball player for the Cleveland Indians
- Chris Schwinden, professional baseball player for the New York Mets
- Betsy Wolfe, Broadway actress and singer, best known for her roles in Waitress and Falsettos
- Kevin Downes, movie producer, actor
- Matt Black, photographer
- Linda Nguyen Lopez, ceramic artist
- Danielle Dutton, author
