= Cameron Creek =

- Location of Cameron Creek in California

Location
- Country: United States
- State: California
- County: Tulare County

Physical characteristics
- Source
  - location: Farmersville, East Visalia, California
  - coordinates: 36°19′05″N 119°13′05″W
  - elevation: 302 ft (92 m)
- Mouth
  - location: Visalia, California, United States
  - coordinates: 36°16′35″N 119°21′43″W
  - elevation: 302 ft (92 m)

Cameron Creek in California, United States, is one of the four main creeks that flow through the city of Visalia and the surrounding communities.

Cameron Creek was named after Alexander and/or Monroe Cameron.

== See also ==
- Mill Creek (Tulare County)
- Packwood Creek
- St. John's River (California)
