= Mill Creek (Tulare County) =

Coordinates: 36.324167°N 119.307222°W

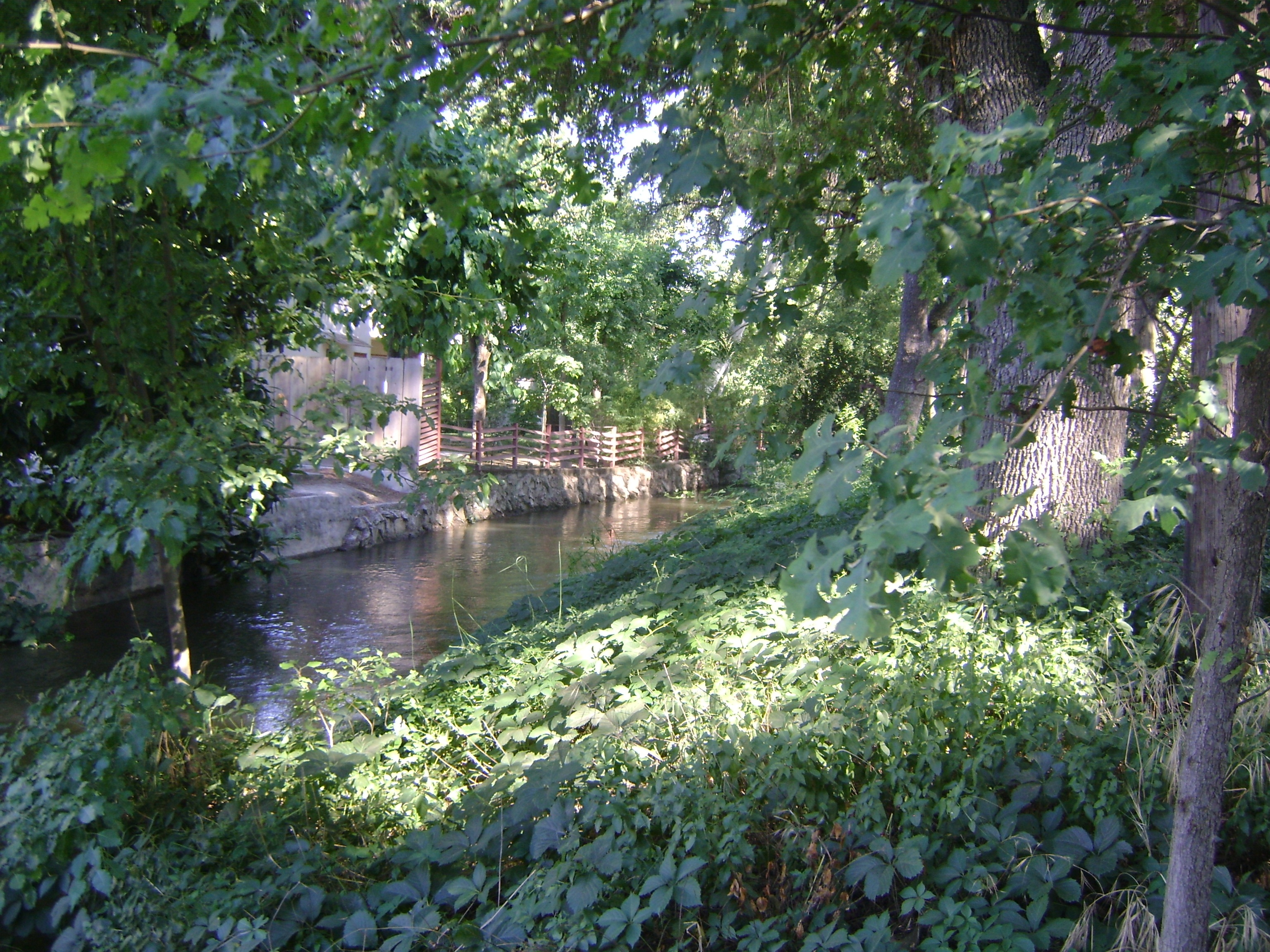
- Mill Creek near Mayors Park in Green Acres

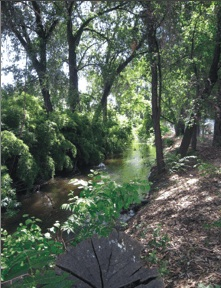
Mill Creek along the northern edge of Redwood High School's Sierra Vista Campus.

Mill Creek is a creek in Tulare County, California. It is a distributary of the Kaweah River. It is one of the four main creeks that flow through the city of Visalia.

== History ==
Mill Creek was named after Dr. Mathew's grist mill.

In 1910, Mill Creek, was lined with cement and covered. Roads and buildings were constructed over it and about one-third of a mile of Mill Creek flows below the surface today. The lining and covering of Mill Creek was predicted by some to be the answer to the flooding problem, but flooding continued.

The city of Visalia was built on the banks of Mill Creek. Today, part of the creek that flows through Downtown is underground, enclosed by a concrete conduit. There are plans to resurface the creek.

== See also ==
- Cameron Creek
- Packwood Creek
- St. John's River (California)
