= El Diamante High School =

Public high school in California, United States

Location
- 5100 W Whitendale Ave, Visalia, CA 93277; Visalia, California 93277; United States; 36°18′22″N 119°20′49″W

Information
- Type: Public
- Established: 2002
- School district: Visalia Unified School District
- Principal: Niels Burgess
- Teaching staff: 85.0(FTE)
- Grades: 9–12
- Enrollment: 1,850 (2025–2026)
- Student to teacher ratio: 21.44
- Colors: Green, Navy Blue and White
- Mascot: Miner Ed
- Nickname: Miners
- Newspaper: The Dig
- Yearbook: Facet
- Website: www.vusd.org/domain/799

El Diamante High School, known locally as "El D", is a WASC-accredited high school serving students in grades 9–12 in Visalia, California, USA, in Tulare County. It was established as Visalia Unified School District's fourth public high school in 2002. Its current feeder elementary schools are Cottonwood Creek Elementary, Crestwood Elementary, Goshen Elementary, Linwood Elementary, and Veva Blunt Elementary whose students will attend either La Joya Middle School or Ridgeview Middle School prior to their 9th-grade year.

== Athletics ==
El Diamante competes in the California Interscholastic Federation (CIF), Central Section Division II, East Yosemite League.

Fall

- Boys' Cross country
- Girls' Cross country
- Football
- Girls' Golf
- Girls' Tennis
- Girls' Volleyball
- Boys' Water polo
- Girls' Water polo

Winter

- Boys' Basketball
- Girls' Basketball
- Boys' Soccer
- Girls' Soccer
- Wrestling

Spring

- Baseball
- Boys' Golf
- Softball
- Swimming
- Boys' Tennis
- Track and field
- Esports

== Student activities ==
=== Student Newspaper, Television, and Yearbook ===
Student newspaper The Dig is published on a monthly basis with a mission "to inspire interest and involvement from the student body within our school, while displaying the achievements, power, knowledge and talents Miners bring to the community."

ED HewS is a student-produced weekly news program. This program airs weekly in student homeroom classes and is archived on the OnAirEdHews YouTube channel.

El Diamante publishes their annual yearbook, The Facet, which is released at the end of the traditional school year.
