= St. John's River (California) =

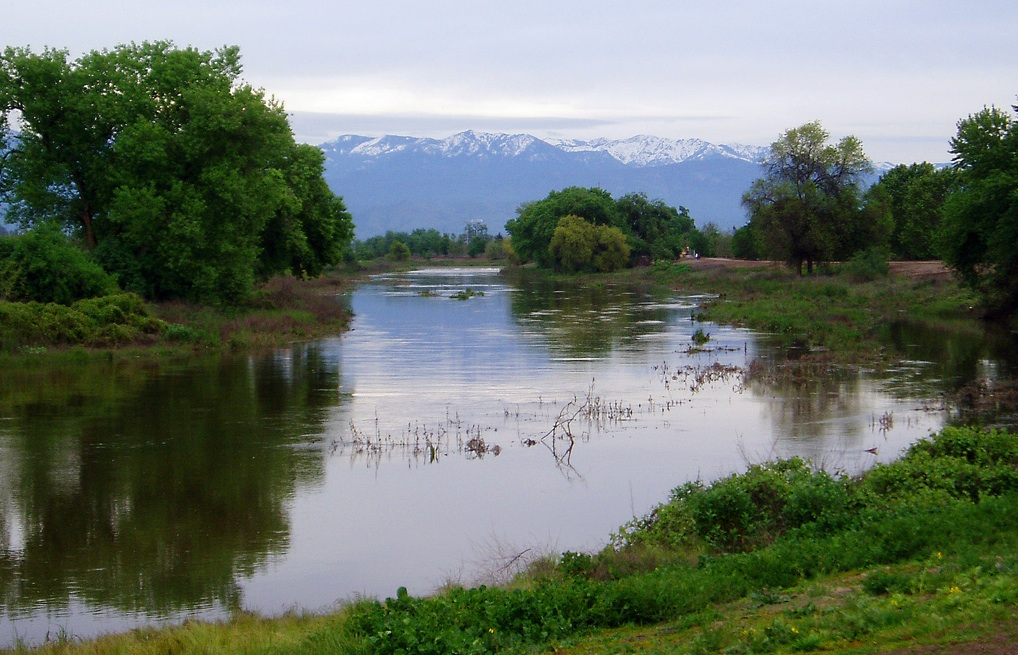
- St. John's River near Visalia

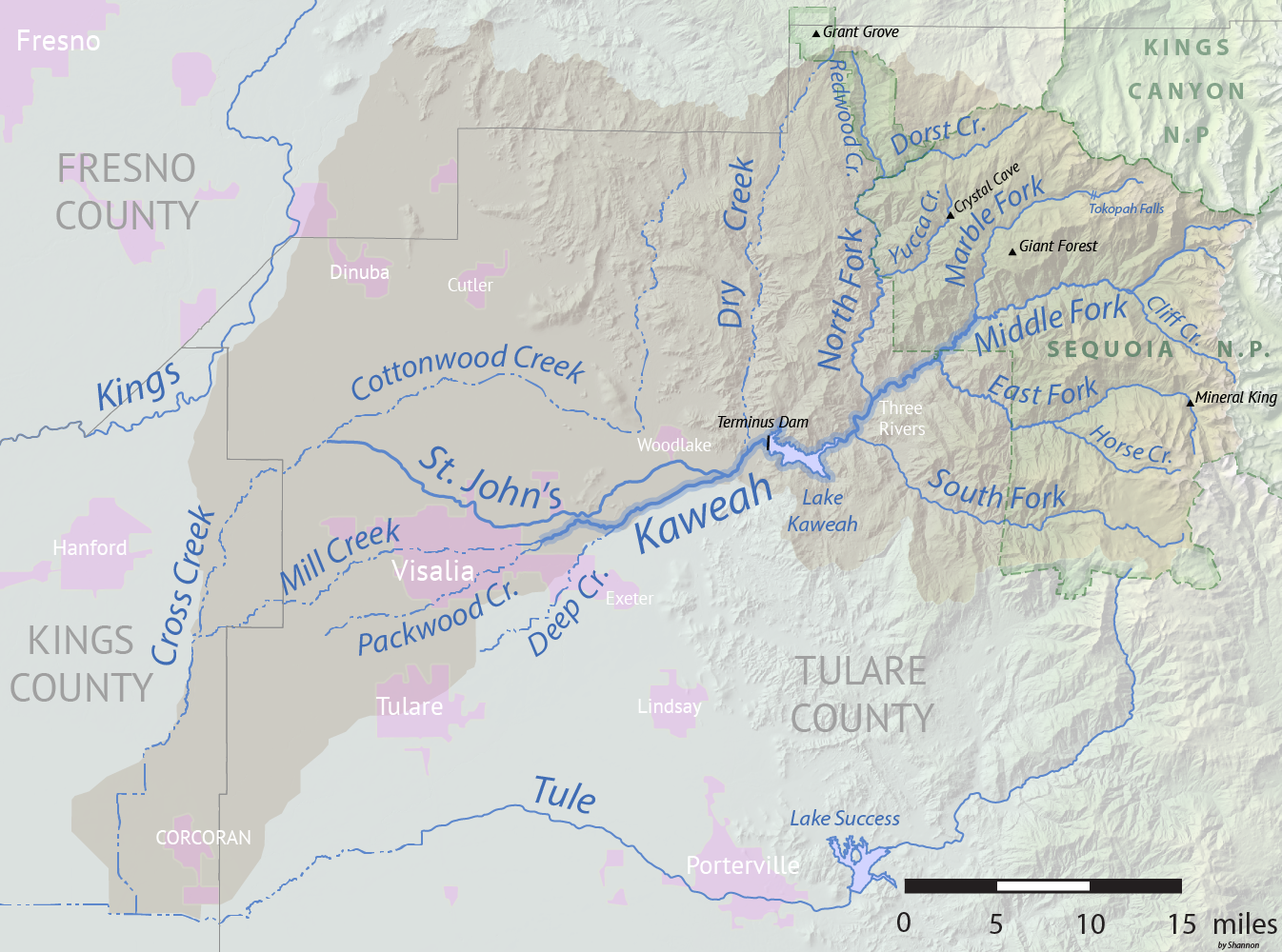
- Map of the distributary St. Johns River also showing the Kaweah River watershed

- Location of the St. Johns River in California

Location
- Country: United States
- State: California
- County: Tulare County

Physical characteristics
- Source: Kaweah River
  - location: Woodlake, East Visalia, California
  - coordinates: 36°20′12″N 119°13′23″W
  - elevation: 279 ft (85 m)
- Mouth
  - location: Traver, California
  - coordinates: 36°25′05″N 119°26′05″W
  - elevation: 279 ft (85 m)
- Length: 26.3 mi (42.3 km)

The St. John's River is a distributary of the Kaweah River in the San Joaquin Valley of California in the United States. The river begins at a diversion dam at McKay's Point, about a mile west of Lemon Cove. The distributary flows west along the north side of the city of Visalia, where it joins Elbow Creek, continuing west to Cross Creek.

Water from this distributary historically flowed into Tulare Lake, as did water continuing down the main channel of the Kaweah. Tulare lake was the terminal sink of an endorheic basin in southern San Joaquin Valley which was also watered by the Kern, Tule, and by some distributaries of the Kings River. Presently water from these rivers is typically used up for irrigation. Water from the St. John's irrigates many thousands of acres of farmland in Tulare County.

At a point about 4 miles (6.4 km) north of Farmersville, the St. John's enters Elbow Creek. It flows then westerly to Cross Creek at a point north of Goshen and back into Elbow Creek at the confluence of Elbow and Cross creeks. This water in time of flood finds its way into the Tulare Lake Basin through Elbow Creek.

== History ==
The St. John's River was named after Loomis St. John and was a product of the 1862 flood.

In 1889, the Tulare Irrigation District was organized, and that body constructed a series of canals which diverted water from the river. From one-half to one-third of the water was lost as it coursed through the unlined canals.

In 1906, the St. John's River levee broke, and water poured into Visalia from the north, which helped cause the floods of 1906.

== See also ==
- Cameron Creek
- Mill Creek (Tulare County)
- Packwood Creek
