= Mt. Whitney High School =

Location
- 900 South Conyer Street; Visalia, California 93277; United States; 36.3229°N 119.2992°W

Information
- Type: Public
- Established: 1952
- School district: Visalia Unified School District
- Principal: Jesus Gonzalez Jr.
- Staff: 77.96 (FTE)
- Grades: 9–12
- Enrollment: 1,629 (2023-2024)
- Student to teacher ratio: 20.90
- Colors: Maroon and white
- Athletics: Yes
- Sports: Yes
- Mascot: Pioneer
- Website: vusd.org/mtwhitney

Mt. Whitney High School is a public high school in Visalia, California, United States, founded in 1952.

== Academics ==
In 2009 Mount Whitney was declared a California Distinguished School.

== Athletics ==
Mt. Whitney competes in the California Interscholastic Federation (CIF), Central Section Division II, East Yosemite League.

== History ==
Mt. Whitney High School opened in 1951 as Visalia High School on Conyer Street, a few blocks away from the site of Visalia Union High School. The new Visalia High School was built to provide room for the rapid growth of the "Baby Boom" that followed World War II. The new site, Visalia High School, provided students in the Visalia Union High School District modern facilities and space for the playing field needed by the growing number of students.

Visalia High School was painted two shades of light blue/aqua, the same colors as the College of the Sequoias on Mooney Boulevard. Both Visalia Union High School and Visalia Junior College, which would become College of the Sequoias, had been located on the old Visalia Union High School campus on Main street.

The need for high school classrooms grew faster than was expected when the Visalia High School campus was opened. In 1955, the old Visalia Union High School campus was reopened as a second high school and named Redwood High School. From 1952 to 1954, the old VUHS campus had served as a junior high school feeding into Visalia High School. At the same time Redwood High was renamed, Visalia High School was renamed Mt. Whitney High School.

Mt. Whitney High retained VUHS's original school colors of maroon and white, the Oak as the yearbook, and their Pioneer mascot.

== Notable alumni ==
- Kevin Costner
- Avi Kaplan
- Cody Gibson
- Tom Johnston, musician
- Ken Khachigian, advisor to Richard Nixon and speech writer to Ronald Reagan
- Don Mosebar, American professional football player
- Nelms brothers
- Holden Powell, MLB relief pitcher
- Lupe Sanchez, American professional football player
- Scott Allen Shaver
- Mike Young, American professional football player
- Inde Navarrette, actress
