= Linda Nguyen Lopez =

American artist

- Born: 1981; Visalia, California
- Known for: ceramist
- Website: lindalopez.net

Linda Nguyen Lopez (b. 1981, Visalia, California) is an American artist known for ceramic art. Lopez attended California State University, Chico and the University of Colorado Boulder. She is located in Fayetteville, Arkansas where she teaches at the University of Arkansas.

Lopez has exhibited nationally at various venues including the Springfield Art Museum and the Crystal Bridges Museum of American Art. She has had residencies at the Clay Studio, the Archie Bray Foundation for the Ceramic Arts, the C.R.E.T.A. Rome Residency Program, and Greenwich House Pottery.

Her work, Blue/Purple Ombré with Rocks, was acquired by the Smithsonian American Art Museum as part of the Renwick Gallery's 50th Anniversary Campaign.
