= Redwood High School (Visalia, California) =

Location
- 1001 West Main Street; Visalia, California 93291; United States; 36°19′46″N 119°18′7″W

Information
- Type: Public
- Established: 1955
- School district: Visalia Unified School District
- Principal: Brandon Gridiron
- Staff: 100.65 (FTE)
- Grades: 9-12
- Enrollment: 2,468 (2023-2024)
- Student to teacher ratio: 24.52
- Colors: Blue and White
- Mascot: Mr. Ranger
- Nickname: Rangers
- Website: Redwood High School website

Redwood High School (usually abbreviated as RHS) is a secondary school in Visalia, California, United States. The public high school serves students from the north west section of the city. The school serves grades 9 through 12. It is one of four traditional, comprehensive high schools administered by the Visalia Unified School District. Its current enrollment numbers about 2470 students.

Green Acres Middle School and Ridgeview Middle School feeds into Redwood. Three private schools in the city, Visalia Christian Academy, St. Paul's, and George McCann Catholic School also supply students to Redwood.

== History ==
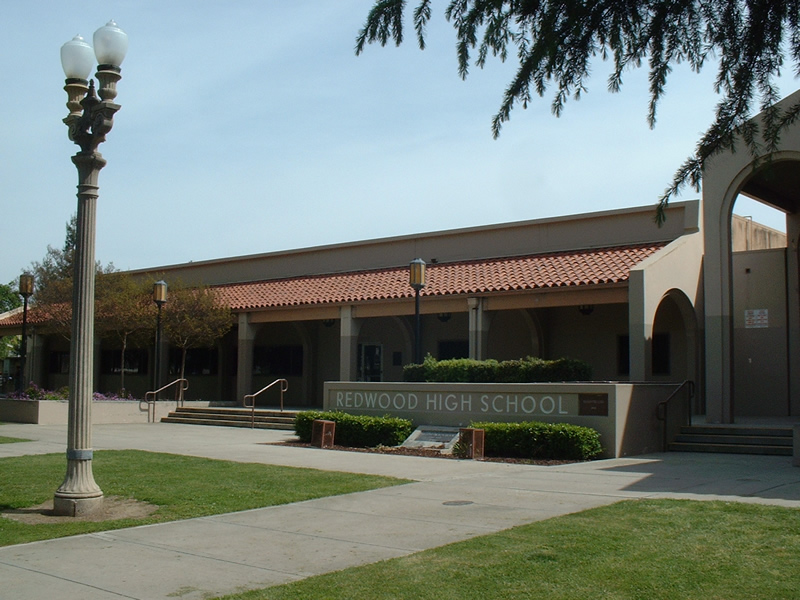
Redwood High School

In 1910, Visalia Union High School was constructed in the style of Mission Revival architecture. The name of the school was eventually changed to Visalia Union High School. In 1952, this school served as a junior high school for two years when a new high school, Mt. Whitney, was opened a few blocks to the south. Two years after Mt. Whitney opened, the old Visalia Union High School campus was renamed Redwood High School. Mt. Whitney High School retained the original school colors and mascot of Visalia Union High School, i.e. maroon & white, The Pioneer.

On October 29, 1965, the Spanish mission style administration building burned and was considered a total loss, although classes were held in portions of the building throughout the year. Indeed, many students took a short-cut through dangerous, burned out portions of the building for the rest of the 1965 school year. The original academic building survives to this day, although alterations to the windows and corridors were necessary. The administration wing was later rebuilt along with a larger library (the original library is now room 32). The original "Senior Court" was moved, from where the present library and memory lane are now located, to the quad area.

Redwood High School celebrated its 50th Birthday in the 2004-2005 school year. In that same year, the 50th Cowhide game against its cross town rival, Mount Whitney High School, was celebrated at the Mineral King Bowl and televised throughout the California Central Valley.

== Campus ==
Redwood has two separate campuses separated by Giddings Street, however it is connected by a bridge that was built in 1996. The Main Campus is bounded by Main Street on the north, Conyer Street on the east, Mineral King Avenue on the south, and Giddings Street on the west. The Sierra Vista Campus is bounded by Mill Creek on the north, Giddings Street on the east, Mineral King Street on the south, and Dollner Street on the west.

=== Main Campus ===
Main Campus houses most of the school's classrooms and facilities, such as the main office, library, swimming pool, and gym. The gym was remolded for a duration of 50 weeks (11.5 months) and was reopened the student body in mid May 2023 after multiple delays.

=== Sierra Vista ===
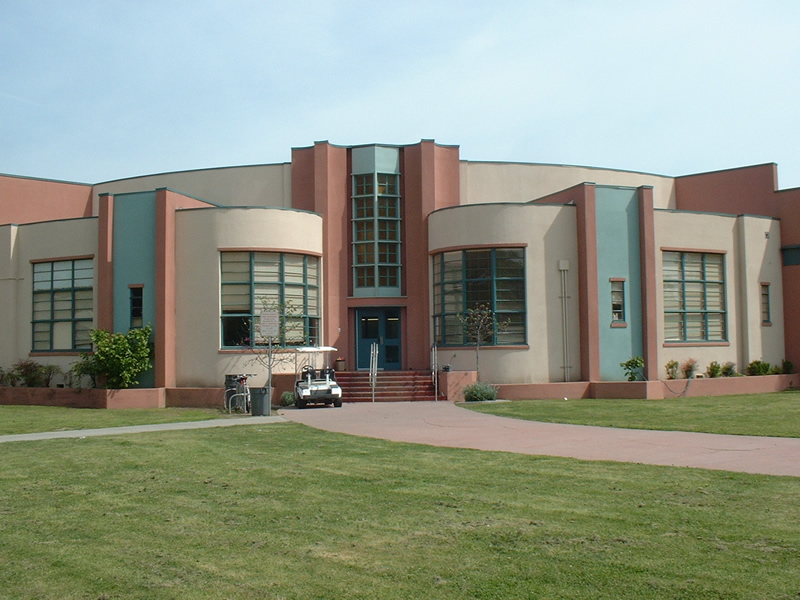
Sierra Vista Campus Entrance

Sierra Vista is mostly made up of math and foreign languages classes. It also includes visual and performing arts, and architecture classes. The Sierra Vista campus is made up of a few portable classrooms, a main building, a theatre, and a baseball diamond. The Sierra Vista Campus was originally Sierra Vista Elementary School, built during The Great Depression and commissioned as part of Franklin D. Roosevelt's "New Deal". The elementary school was later absorbed by Redwood High School. The Rotary Theater is directly connected to the Sierra Vista building and is the home to the Green Acres Little Theater, along with Redwood, Golden West and Mt. Whitney High Schools' productions. .

=== Annie R. Mitchell Library & Media Center ===
The Library was named in honor of Annie Rosalind Mitchell in 1989. Annie Mitchell was Dean of Girls at Visalia Union High School.

Today, the Annie R. Mitchell library houses over 25,000 books for the over 2,100 students that use the facility. The library is decorated with 35 flags from around the world, photographs of students dating back to 1900, and a preserved Golden Eagle.

=== L.J. Williams Theater ===
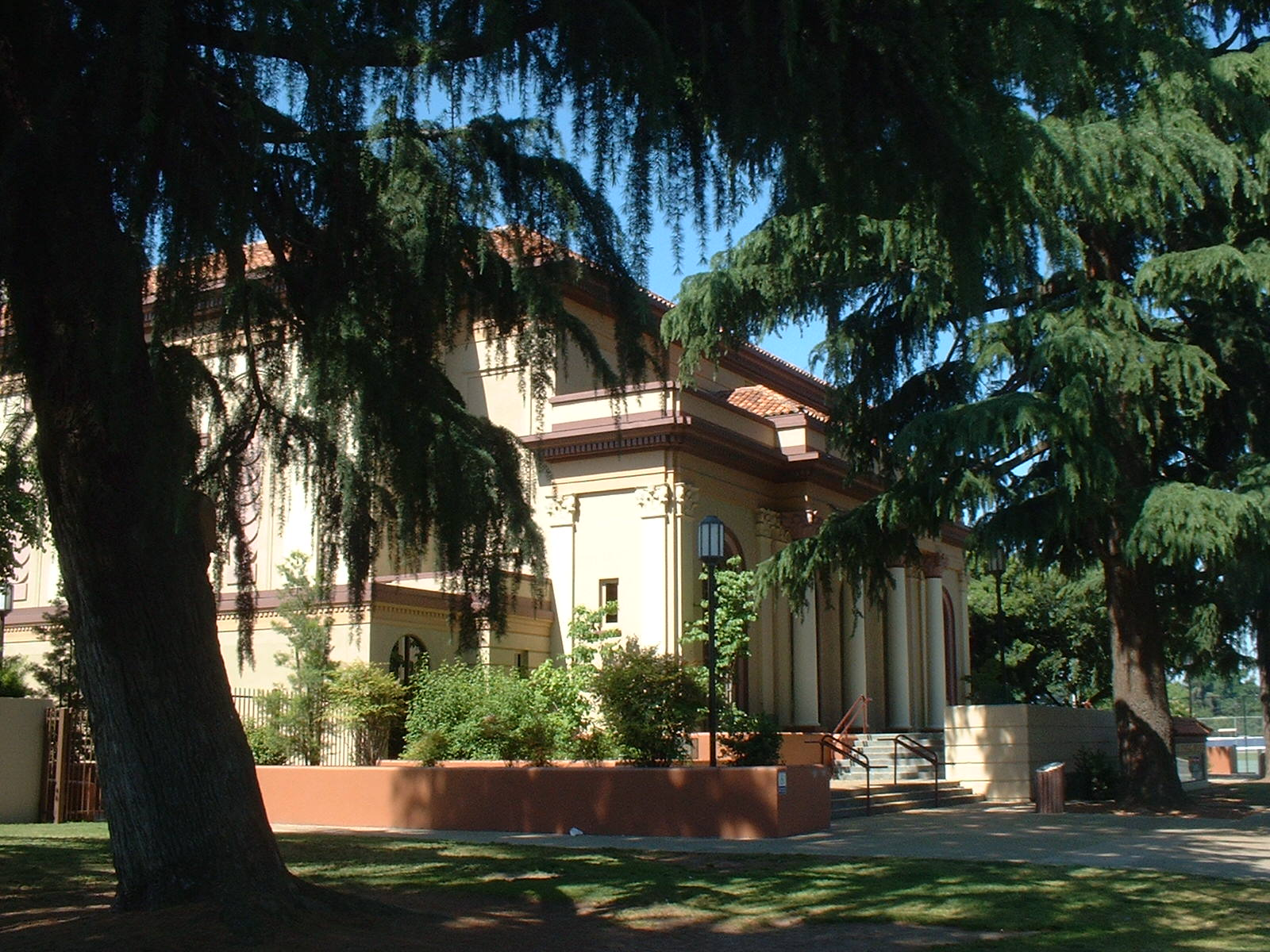
The L. J. Williams Theater, located on the Redwood High School Campus.

The L.J. Williams Theater was constructed in the 1930s, and has hosted many artistic events, including concerts and plays. It was named for Mr. Lawrence J. Williams, former instructor and principal of Visalia Union High School and the first President of College of the Sequoias.

=== Mill Creek ===
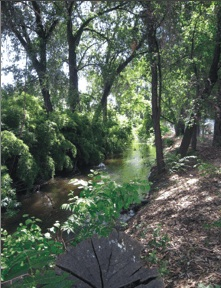
Mill Creek running along the northernmost part of the Sierra Vista campus

Mill Creek is a creek that runs through the city of Visalia, including both of Redwood's campuses. Starting at the southeast part of the main campus, the creek runs underground until halfway, then it runs along the south campus, dividing the main campus from the Mineral King Bowl, continuing under Giddings Street and finally along the northern edge of the Sierra Vista campus and into Green Acres.

== Student body ==
The school's ethnic composition is 62.2% Hispanic, 24.1% White, 5.95% Asian, 1.13% African-American, and 6.62% "other".

== Athletics ==
Redwood competes in the California Interscholastic Federation (CIF), Central Section Division II, East Yosemite League (EYL). Redwood's direct rival is Mount Whitney High School.

=== The Cowhide Game ===
The Cowhide is a cross-town rivalry football game held annually against Mt. Whitney High School during late October and is held at the Mineral King Bowl. This game is the last game before advancing into league. The Cowhide game is an annual tradition between the two schools, where the winning high school gains ownership of the cowhide skin to be hung in the winning school's gymnasium for the year. The first Cowhide game was held in 1955.

== 2026 Senior Photo Controversy ==
In February 2026, students became the subject of public scrutiny after a photograph circulated on social media showing a group of seniors spelling out a homophobic slur during a senior class photo event. According to reporting, students initially posed in the school gymnasium to spell out "Always Legit, Class of 2026" with coordinated lettered shirts. After the official photograph was taken, a subset of students rearranged the letters and a number to form a derogatory term targeting LGBTQ+ individuals. The image was shared online and drew regional and national attention.

The Visalia Unified School District issued a public statement condemning the behavior as "unacceptable" and not reflective of district values. District officials confirmed that an investigation was initiated and that disciplinary measures would be taken in accordance with district policy, though specific consequences were not publicly disclosed.

Community organizations, including The Source LGBT+ Center in Visalia, publicly criticized the incident, stating that such actions can contribute to a hostile environment for LGBTQ+ students.

== Notable alumni ==
- Aaron Hill (2000) - MLB second baseman
- Bob Ojeda (1976) - MLB pitcher
- Robert B. Laughlin - Nobel laureate
- Sam Gendel - Saxophone player
- Sam Bower (2019) - Current MLB pitcher for the San Francisco Giants
- Joey Volchko (2023) - Current MLB pitcher for the Chicago White Sox
