= Visalia Unified School District =

School district in California

Address
- 5000 West Cypress Avenue Visalia, California, 93277; United States

District information
- Type: Public
- Motto: We Create Futures
- Grades: K–12
- Established: 1965; 61 years ago
- Superintendent: Kirk Shrum
- NCES District ID: 0641160

Students and staff
- Students: 28,884 (2020–2021)
- Teachers: 1,287.52 (FTE)
- Staff: 1,512.4 (FTE)
- Student–teacher ratio: 22.43:1

Other information
- Website: www.vusd.org

The Visalia Unified School District is located in Tulare County, California. The school district covers an area of 214 miles, and includes 27 elementary schools, a newcomer language assessment center, five middle schools, four comprehensive high schools, a continuation high school, an adult school, a charter alternative academy, a charter independent study school, a K-8 charter home school, and a school that serves orthopedic handicapped students. The VUSD area has a population base of over 135,000 people, over 32,000 of which are served by the school district.

== History ==
Visalia Unified School District was established in 1965. VUSD was created by the unification of Visalia Union High School and the elementary districts it served. It had among its origins the Packwood School, created in 1845, and the Visalia City School District created in 1855.

Since 1965, VUSD has a long-standing investment in Career Technical Education, with over 4,000 students involved in the programs through the four comprehensive high schools as well as Sequoia High School, Visalia Technical Early College and Visalia Charter Independent Study. VUSD offers Career Technical Education pathways in 13 of the 15 industry sectors recognized by the State of California. VUSD offers the following Linked Learning Academies: Agricultural Biosciences & Technology; Architecture & Engineering; Business Finance Academy; Computer Science; First Responders; Health Sciences; Law & Justice; Media Arts; and Sports, Therapy, Rehabilitation, Orthopedics and Neuromuscular Gains (STRONG).

Through the academies, VUSD students do job shadowing and internship opportunities as part of their career exploration.

== Boundary ==
It includes almost all of Visalia, as well as Goshen, Ivanhoe, Linnell Camp, Patterson Tract, and West Goshen.

== Schools ==
=== Elementary schools ===
- Annie R. Mitchell Elementary School
- Conyer Elementary School
- Cottonwood Creek Elementary School
- Crestwood Elementary School
- Crowley Elementary School
- Denton Elementary School
- Elbow Creek Elementary School
- Fairview Elementary School
- Four Creeks Elementary School
- Golden Oak Elementary School
- Goshen Elementary School
- Highland Elementary School
- Houston Elementary School
- Hurley Elementary School
- Ivanhoe Elementary School
- Linwood Elementary School
- Manuel F. Hernandez Elementary School
- Mineral King Elementary School
- Mountain View Elementary School
- Oak Grove Elementary School
- Pinkham Elementary School
- Riverway Elementary School
- Royal Oaks Elementary School
- Shannon Ranch Elementary School
- Veva Blunt Elementary School
- Washington Elementary School
- Willow Glen Elementary School

=== Middle schools ===
- Green Acres Middle School
- La Joya Middle School
- Ridgeview Middle School
- Valley Oak Middle School
- Divisadero Middle School

=== High schools ===
- El Diamante High School
- Golden West High School
- Mt. Whitney High School
- Redwood High School
- Sequoia High School

=== Other Visalia District Schools ===
- Visalia Adult School
- Charter Alternative Academy
- Charter Home School
- River Bend School
- Visalia Charter Independent Study
- Global Learning Charter School
- Visalia Technical Early College
Logo
